= Premiership of Danielle Smith =

Danielle Smith's time as premier of Alberta and her policies

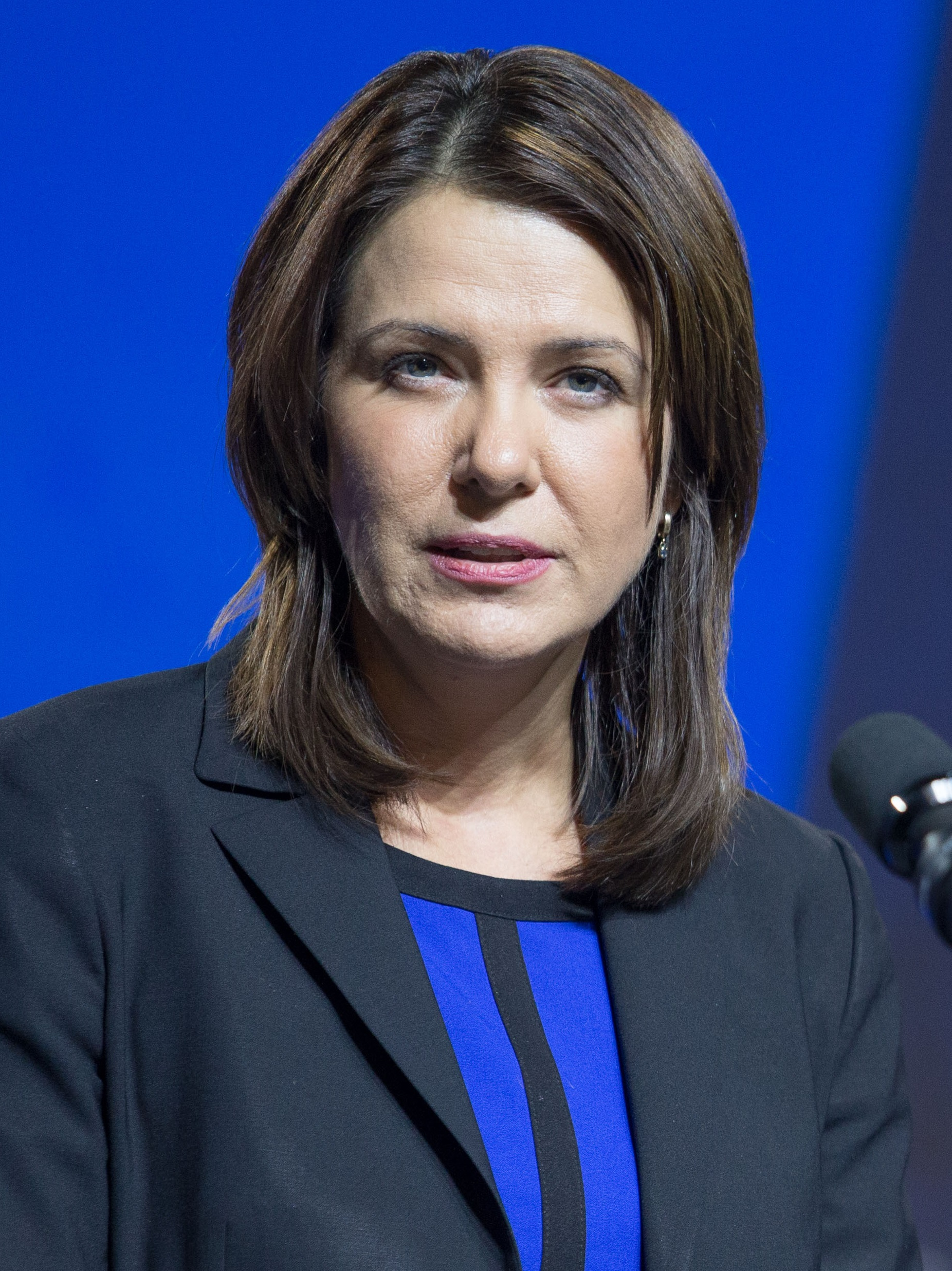
- Premiership of Danielle Smith; 11 October 2022 – present
- Monarch: Charles III
- Premier: Danielle Smith
- Cabinet: Smith ministry
- Party: United Conservative
- Election: 2023
- Appointed by: Salma Lakhani
- Seat: Alberta Legislature Building
- Constituency: Outside legislature (October–November 2022); Brooks-Medicine Hat (November 2022–present)

The premiership of Danielle Smith began on 11 October 2022 when she was sworn in by Lieutenant Governor of Alberta, Salma Lakhani. Smith won the 2022 United Conservative Party leadership election to replace then Alberta Premier Jason Kenney on October 6, 2022, and was appointed as the 19th Premier of Alberta. Her cabinet was sworn in on 22 October.

== 2022 United Conservative Party leadership election ==
Smith won the 2022 UCP leadership election on October 6, 2022, defeating six candidates with 53% of the UCP caucus vote on the sixth and final ranked ballot. The 30th Alberta Legislature was constituted on 11 October 2022.

She won the by-election as MLA for Brooks-Medicine Hat on November 8, 2022.

== 30th Alberta Legislature (2022-2023) ==
On October 21, 2022 the cabinet was sworn in by the Lieutenant Governor of Alberta, Salma Lakhani. Ministers in the newly formed cabinet who had held key ministries and responsibilities during the Premiership of Jason Kenney, included Jason Copping as Minister of Health, Tyler Shandro as Minister of Justice, Adriana LaGrange as Minister of Education, Demetrios Nicolaides as minister of Minister of Advanced Education, and Rick Wilson as Minister of Indigenous Relations.

By October 21, the total roster of 27 cabinet members and their eleven secretaries represented nearly "two-thirds of the entire governing United Conservative Party caucus. This includes Kaycee Madu and Nathan Neudorf as Deputy Premiers of Alberta on 21 October, Matt Jones as Minister of Affordability and Utilities, Nate Horner as Minister of Agriculture and Irrigation, Mickey Amery as Minister of Children's Services, Jason Luan as Minister of Culture, Peter Guthrie as Minister of Energy, Sonya Savage as Minister of Environment and Protected Areas, Travis Toews as Minister of Finance and President of Treasury Board, Todd Loewen as Minister of Forestry, Parks and Tourism, Brian Jean as Minister of Jobs, Economy and Northern Development, Nicholas Milliken as Minister of Mental Health and Addictions, Rebecca Schulz as Minister of Municipal Affairs, Mike Ellis as Minister of Public Safety, Jeremy Nixon as Minister of Seniors, Community and Social Services, Dale Nally as Minister of Service Alberta and Red Tape Reduction, Nate Glubish as Minister of Technology and Innovation, Rajan Sawhney as Minister of Trade, Immigration and Multiculturalism, Rajan Sawhney, and Devin Dreeshen as Minister of Transportation and Economic Corridors who were also sworn in on October 21.

=== Bill 1 ===
As promised in her election campaign as a contender for the leadership of the UCP replacing then Alberta Premier Jason Kenney, the first piece of legislation Premier Smith introduced on the first day of the fall sitting of the 4th Session of the 30th Alberta Legislature was Bill 1: Alberta Sovereignty Within a United Canada Act, commonly known as the Alberta Sovereignty Act. It was introduced on 29 November 2022 on the first day of the fall sitting of the 4th Session of the 30th Alberta Legislature by Premier Smith and passed on December 8, 2022. The final requirement before it passes into law is the royal assent, which is mostly viewed as ceremonial. Lieutenant Governor Lakhani told media on 2 September, after Smith had announced her intention to introduce Bill 1, that she would be seeking legal advice before giving assent to the Act, in order to ensure she would be "do[ing] the right thing for our people and for our Constitution".

The Act was a key component of Smith campaign during the United Conservative Party (UCP) leadership election in 2022, contributing to her election as UCP leader and appointment as Premier of Alberta.

=== Bill 2 ===
Affordability and Utilities Minister Matt Jones introduced Bill 2: Inflation Relief Statutes Amendment Act on 7 December. If passed, Bill 2 would provide targeted relief through monthly cash payments of $100 to some families and seniors with combined incomes of less than $180,000 following submission of applications. Opposition Shannon Phillips said that the bill as it stands reflects a "back-of-the-napkin approach" lacking critical details while neglecting many who struggle with their finances.

== Ministry of Health ==
Included in Health Minister Jason Copping's 14 November mandate letter from Premier Smith, was a reminder to consider the affordability crisis and inflation in decisions related to the eleven expectations or commitments listed in the health portfolio. First on the list was a call to assess and reform the health care system including the Health Quality Council of Alberta (HQCA) and Alberta Health Services (AHS). This includes an immediate response to issues such as lengthy ER wait times and EMS response times.

In 2022 Premier Smith created a panel to review Alberta's COVID-19 pandemic response.

On January 10, 2023, Premier Smith told reporters that she had asked Nate Glubish— Minister of technology and innovation—to move forward on the creation of Health Spending Accounts, similar to those offered by some industries and professions. The accounts—if implemented—would be funded with a combination of $300 seed money from the provincial government supplemented with equal payment from individuals based on a sliding-scale. In a 2021 University of Calgary, School of Public Policy academic paper, Smith described the concept of user fees in the form of Health Spending Accounts as one of the solutions for Alberta's key challenges. Smith's concern, at that time, was to reduce the $12 billion "structural shortfall" of expenses-versus-revenue by slowly introducing scaled-to-income user fees of $3 billion, with Health Spending Accounts as only one prong on the multi-pronged proposal. Because the Health Spending Account can be spent on a wider choice of health care options—orthodontics, physiotherapists, dieticians—individuals can use the $600 on preventative healthcare that is not covered by the public system. The goal is to "change the conversation on health care" and revisit the concept of "universal social programs that are 100 per cent paid by taxpayers."

The two top priorities in the mandate letter to Minister Tyler Shandro were the Alberta Sovereignty Act and amendments to the Alberta Human Rights Act (AHRA) to protect people from losing their jobs because of COVID-19 vaccination and/or booster status. An amendment to AHRA if passed, would allow complaints to be made Alberta Human Rights Commission if a denial of work, housing or other services was related to their vaccine status. If the complaint were considered valid they would then advance to the Alberta Human Rights Tribunal where an assessment would be made. The Tribunal may find that "vaccination was a justifiable requirement for the workplace, facility, or service in question".

In a January 21, 2023 in a radio call-in show, Premier Smith announced that there would be a review of email contacts between Alberta Crown Prosecution Service (ACPS) and the office of the premier's staff in response to the January 19 CBC News article questioning the way in which Crown prosecutors were handling cases related to the February 2022 blockade at the Canada-U.S. border. The CBC article was based on an unnamed source about alleged correspondence the CBC staff had not read, saying that there were emails sent from the office of the premier to Crown prosecutors. On January 23, the Justice Department reported that following an Alberta Public Service investigation no evidence of these allegations had been found. ACPS assistant deputy minister Kimberley Goddard said in a January 23 email said that it was wrong to continue to criticize the ACPS for inappropriate and unethical behaviour based on unwarranted and unsubstantiated allegations of "impropriety without evidence." CBC's Head of Public Affairs said they are still questioning whether there were emails "but not on the government email system." On March 29, Calgary pastor Artur Pawlowski's YouTube video, since removed, entitled "January 26, 2023" of a 11-minute telephone call between Premier Smith and Pawlowski, was aired in the Alberta Legislature, raising fresh calls for an investigation into potential political interference. In the conversation the premier explained to Pawlowski that she could not grant him amnesty. She said that she only has the authority to ask the Justice minister and his senior bureaucrats about the "reasonable likelihood of convictions and whether going to trial would be in the public interest". Smith has been very open about her criticism of COVID-19 public health measures and was sympathetic with Pawlowski who is facing charges under the province's Critical Infrastructure Defence Act. The Alberta ethics commissioner started investigating Smith in April, 2023 for her alleged interference with the administration of justice. In May 2023 the ethics commissioner found that Smith had contravened the Conflict of Interest Act by discussing criminal charges against Artur Pawlowski with the justice minister Tyler Shandro and with Pawlowski himself.

=== AHS and MHCare sole-source contracts ===
Sam Hassan Mraiche's Edmonton-based Mraiche Holding Corporation—a subsidiary of Mraiche Investment Corporation with "no prior experience in healthcare"—was granted a $228 million contract to provide personal protective equipment (PPE) to AHS during the COVID pandemic. This sole-source contract led to the establishment of a Mraiche Investment Corporation subsidiary, MHCare Medical, an import company.

In December 2022, during a nation-wide shortage of acetaminophen for children, AHS issued prepayments to MHCare for several years for pharmaceuticals, which included a $70-million contract to procure Parol brand acetaminophen, imported by MHCare from Atabay. Alberta paid the entire cost even though most of the Parol order never arrived. Concerns were raised when in July 2023, AHS made a $28-million prepayment to MHCare, just weeks after ordering hospitals to discontinue use of Parol.

== 31st Alberta Legislature (2023-present) ==
Smith led the UCP to victory in a fiercely contested election, securing a reduced majority against Rachel Notley's New Democratic Party. The UCP's vote share declined slightly from 55% to 53%, resulting in the loss of eleven seats. Notably, the UCP came second in Calgary but won nearly all seats outside Edmonton and Calgary.

In May, following the 2025 Canadian federal election, Smith announced that her government would hold a referendum on Alberta's separation from Canada if citizens gathered enough signatures to prompt a referendum. In July, a report was published about the 2024 Jasper wildfire, stating the UCP government hindered firefighting efforts with constant requests for information and by seeking to exercise decision-making authority, despite not being jurisdictionally responsible. The report stated the interference disrupted the focus of incident commanders and forced them to spend time managing inquiries and issues instead of fighting the fire and leading the re-entry of residents, resulting in more damage being caused that could have otherwise been prevented. Smith demanded the report be retracted and that the fire-stricken town of Jasper apologize for it, and in response Jasper mayor Richard Ireland stated that they would stand by the report and not retract it.

On May 26, 2025, Smith announced her intention to ban books containing "sexual content" from school libraries in Alberta. A list of books to be banned was provided for by anti-LGBTQ groups "Parents for Choice in Education" (a parental rights group) and Action4Canada. The book ban was to be implemented for October 1, 2025, but was put on pause on September 2 over backlash.

Smith announced an October 2026 provincial referendum on nine questions, including immigration and Constitutional changes. On May 21, 2026, Smith announced a tenth referendum question, on whether Alberta should remain within Canada or pursue a path toward a binding referendum on separating from Canada.

=== Parents Rights bills introduced ===
At the annual UCP caucus meeting on November 4, 2023, Premier Smith received the loudest applause when she pledged support for "parental rights," a key principle of the influential Take Back Alberta (TBA) movement within the caucus, whose "freedom fighters" hold all 18 UCP board member seats. Founded by David Parker, the group has played a major role in shaping the party's direction and policy decisions since gaining prominence in 2022. According to political scientist, Duane Bratt, the TBA was shifted support from Jason Kenney to Smith in the UCP leadership race.

The changes to the Bill of Rights and the new transgender health and sex-ed policies were influenced by UCP members at previous party conventions.

On October 30, 2024, Premier Smith announced proposed changes to The Education Amendment Act, 2024, The Fairness and Safety in Sport Act, and The Health Statutes Amendment Act, 2024. At the United Conservative Party annual meeting on November 3–4, 2024, with 6,000 Albertans participating, Premier Smith garnered a 91.5% approval rating for following through on her promises to the caucus.

On December 3, 2024, the Alberta legislature passed bills banning doctors from treating those under 16 with puberty blockers or hormone therapy and banning transgender athletes from competing in female sports. They also passed a law requiring parental consent when students under 16 wish to change their gender pronouns. Bill 26, the Health Statutes Amendment Act 2024, bans gender-affirming surgeries for minors under 18 in Alberta. Smith said she might use the notwithstanding clause to protect these laws.

The policies regarding transgender youth in Alberta became law on December 5, 2024, when Bills 26, 27, and 29 received Royal Assent. These bills, introduced on October 31, 2024, passed the final stage of debate in the legislature earlier that week. The legislation covers changes in education, healthcare, and sports affecting transgender and non-binary youth.

While the laws have been passed, their implementation dates vary. The Fairness and Safety in Sport Act is anticipated to take effect in fall 2025, and the amendments to the Education Act are expected to take effect in September 2025. The Health Statutes Amendment Act is expected to come into effect in the coming months following December 2024. As of January 31, 2025, some of these laws have not yet been implemented.

According to an article in The Economist, Saskatchewan's Parents' Bill of Rights, and New Brunswick's Policy 713 have been cited as "examples of the encroachment of American "culture wars" into Canadian politics". In Saskatchewan's case, Premier Scott Moe enshrined its policies in legislation called the Parents' Bill of Rights and invoked the constitution's Notwithstanding clause to protect it from legal challenges based on the Charter of Rights and Freedoms. Both the Parents' Bill of Rights and New Brunswick's Policy 713 have resulted in significant protests and counter-protests.

== AIMCo ==
In November 2024, Premier Smith appointed former Prime Minister, Stephen Harper as Chair of the Alberta Investment Management Corporation (AIMCo). Harper will oversee AIMCO's $160 billion which includes pension funds and the Heritage Savings Trust Fund. This move has been seen as a departure from the traditional Canadian pension model, which emphasizes independence and political neutrality.

=== Ministry of Health (Alberta Health) ===
==== Alberta COVID-19 task force review ====
The $2-million 269-page Alberta's COVID-19 pandemic response review released on 24 January 2025, recommended a halt in COVID-19 vaccines for children. Premier Smith has harshly criticized "pandemic rules and vaccine mandates". In response to criticism in the Globe and Mail saying the panel's report contradicted scientific consensus, the review chair, Dr. Gary Davidson, said that he did not believe in "scientific consensus". Jay Bhattacharya, a co-author of the Great Barrington Declaration, also served on the panel. Deena Hinshaw, Alberta's Chief Medical Officer of Health during the pandemic, cautioned in 2020 that the implementation of the Declaration recommendations were "not supported by evidence" and would cause an increase in deaths and hospitalizations. According to a CBC article, the panel's review has been described as "anti-science" and "anti-evidence" by the Alberta Medical Association. Dr. John Conly demanded that his name be removed from the report. The report was updated on 28 January.

==== Dismissal of AHS CEO ====
According to a report by the Globe and Mail, the sudden firing on January 8, 2025, of Athana Mentzelopoulos—who had served as CEO of Alberta Health Services with a four-year contract since December 11, 2023—was allegedly linked to her internal investigation of procurement practices at AHS, such as private surgical contracts, and government contracts. This included over $600 million awarded to MHCare Medical.

A $1.7-million wrongful dismissal lawsuit's statement of claim was filed with the Court of King's Bench of Alberta by Mentzelopoulos' lawyers. It includes the allegation that Health Minister Adriana LaGrange had issued a directive preventing AHS from negotiating private surgery contracts. In addition, it mandated surgical clinic rates that surpassed those of comparable contracts. Both LaGrange and Smith dispute these claims. The statement of claim cited a private clinic in Edmonton—Alberta Surgical Group (ASG)—that despite its underperformance, ASG was reportedly on track to overbill AHS by approximately $3.5 million. This discrepancy was noted as the clinic's contract was coming up for renewal.

Postmedia Calgary reported that Mentzelopoulos's lawsuit alleges several concerns regarding Jitendra Prasad, particularly his potential conflict of interest and influence on AHS contracts, particularly in relation to MHCare. The lawsuit claims that Prasad, referred to as "his guy" by Marshall Smith, then chief of staff to Premier Smith, was installed at Alberta Health to ensure the government could "get contracting right". Mraiche and Smith deny any wrongdoing. According to CTV News, Mraiche and MHCare—his medical supply business—served a political podcast by an AHS orderly with a $6M defamation lawsuit alleging that the online site said Mraiche's companies and subsidiaries were "awarded two controversial [and sole-sourced] contracts" from AHS and that Mraiche later hosted UCP politicians for free in a VIP box at Oilers' hockey games.

== See also ==
- Premiership of Jason Kenney
- Premiership of Doug Ford
- Alberta Sovereignty Within a United Canada Act
- 30th Alberta Legislature
- Alberta Energy Regulator
- Alberta Geological Survey
- Alberta Health Services
- Alberta Human Rights Commission
- Alberta Municipal Government Board
- Alberta Oil Sands Technology and Research Authority
- Alberta Parks
- Economy of Alberta

== Citations ==
Albertan premierships
Preceded by Jason Kenney	Danielle Smith; 2022–present	Incumbent
