= Premiership of Jason Kenney =

Aspect of Canadian politics

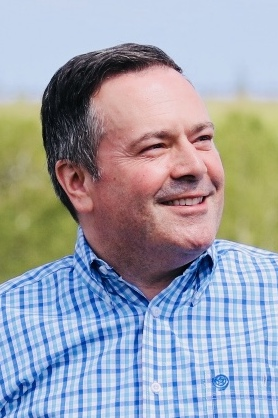
- Premiership of Jason Kenney; April 30, 2019 – October 11, 2022
- Monarchs: Elizabeth II; Charles III
- Premier: Jason Kenney
- Cabinet: Kenney Ministry
- Party: United Conservative
- Election: 2019
- Appointed by: Lois Mitchell
- Seat: Alberta Legislature Building
- Constituency: Calgary-Lougheed

The premiership of Jason Kenney began on April 30, 2019, when Jason Kenney and his cabinet were sworn in by Lieutenant Governor of Alberta, Lois Mitchell. Kenney was invited to form the 30th Alberta Legislature and became the 18th Premier of Alberta, following the 2019 Alberta general election where Kenney's United Conservative Party (UCP) won a majority of seats in the Alberta Legislature leading to the resignation of Premier Rachel Notley. Kenney stepped down as leader of the UCP party on May 18, 2022, after receiving 51.4% of the UCP party members' votes. His premiership ended shortly after Danielle Smith won the subsequent leadership election and was sworn in as premier.

The approval rating for Premier Kenney's response to the COVID-19 pandemic is the lowest in Canada, falling to 33% in June 2021. (Note: Kenney's approval rating was down 51% in August 2020 down from 67% in April 2020.) By December 1, 2020, Kenney's overall approval rate among Albertans had dropped to 30% from 60% in September 2019. In March 2020, the reasons for the drop in popularity had included the UCP's response to the 2020 Canadian pipeline and railway protests—including the bill targeting those who disrupt critical infrastructure with severe penalties. Other concerns included aggressive cuts in the 2019 and 2020 budgets designed to balance the budget and support the oil and gas sector. Reductions to funding for post-secondary institutions and to municipalities and the freeze on spending on health and public schools also raised questions. The provincial government unilaterally changed the way doctors could bill the province and warned that there would be freezes or cuts to government employees in the spring of 2020. Concerns were raised about the cost of the Canadian Energy Centre and about the March 4 decision to "fully or partially [close] 20 provincial parks and seeking "partnerships" for 164 more." The bill that targeted those who disrupt critical infrastructure with severe penalties also raised concerns.

By April 7, 2020, a combination of interconnected unprecedented global events—including the 2020 coronavirus pandemic, the COVID-19 recession, the 2020 stock market crash, and the 2020 Russia–Saudi Arabia oil price war with the resulting "collapse in oil prices"—represent what Premier Kenney called "the greatest challenge" in Alberta's "modern history, threatening its main industry and wreaking havoc on its finances."

By April 19, 2020, as the collapse in the price of oil worsened, Alberta's benchmark crude oil—Western Canadian Select (WCS)—descended to negative pricing. By May 2021, the price of WCS had increased to $USD54.78, representing an increase of $USD40 a barrel compared to June 2020.

By January 7, 2021, faced with the controversy related to international visits undertaken by members of the caucus and the cabinet, as well as key staff, during the pandemic. Alberta, at one point, had the highest total COVID-19 case in Canada. In response, the UCP experienced a "sharp decline" in the polls.

Alberta intends to join TC Energy in their $15 billion North American Free Trade Agreement (NAFTA) Chapter 11 claim against the United States over the Keystone XL pipeline cancellation, according to a July 7, 2021 Financial Post. This represents a potentially very expensive and very long legal challenge, which the US has never lost.

Of the Albertans surveyed on their voting intentions for the 2023 provincial elections—41% said they would vote for the NDP, 30% for the UCP, and 20% for the Wildrose Independence Party, according to a June 2021 Angus Reid Institute poll. The UCP government also ranked lowest in Canada in its response to COVID-19, with only 33% of Albertans approving of their response as of June 2021. Faced with a potential caucus revolt, Kenney called for a leadership review on May 18, 2022, where he would go on to receive 51% approval from the party membership. While technically sufficient for him to remain leader of the party under the United Conservative Party's constitution, Jason Kenney nonetheless announced, moments after the results were released, that he would resign as UCP leader, and Premier of Alberta (albeit he will only formally leave office once the party elects a new leader). Reuters described his leadership style as "uncompromising", "tenacious" and "combative".

== 2019 election ==
Kenney won the United Conservative Party leadership election October 28, 2017. He previously represented Calgary Midnapore. In the 2019 Alberta general election held on April 16, 2019, Kenney won with won 54.88% of the popular vote and 63 seats in the legislature. The 30th Alberta Legislature was constituted after the general election on April 16, 2019.

== Cabinet and Office of the Premier ==
On April 30, the cabinet was sworn in by Lieutenant Governor of Alberta, Lois Mitchell. Ministers in the newly formed cabinet included Travis Toews who was appointed President of Treasury Board and Minister of Finance on April 30, 2019. Doug Schweitzer as Minister of Justice and Solicitor General, Jason Nixon as Minister of Environment and Parks , Sonya Savage as Minister of Energy, Nixon was appointed House Leader, and Doug Schweitzer, Ric McIver, and Savage were appointed as Deputy House Leaders on April 30, 2019.

By September 2021, during the fourth wave of the COVID-19 pandemic as Alberta's health system was overwhelmed, Premier Kenney faced criticism from all sides including from the official opposition and some MLAs those in the UCP caucus—who allegedly challenged his leadership. Critics, who included 2 UCP MLAs blamed Premier Kenney for his "inaction on the fourth wave of the pandemic, saying he waited too long to introduce new measures and that delay will cost lives." In response, Premier Kenney shuffled his cabinet, replacing Tyler Shandro as Minister of Health with Jason Copping. Tyler will replace Copping as Minister of immigration.

== Overview ==
The UCP government repealed the federal Carbon Tax in 2019 and replaced it with a provincial carbon tax on industrial emitters, which does not tax consumers directly.

In 2019, the government began a series of corporate tax cuts with the goal of becoming the most competitive rate in Canada—8% by 2022–23.

The government deferred arbitration on public sector wages.

They established the commission an inquiry into anti-Alberta energy campaigns, called the Canadian Energy Centre—a 'war room'. A report was commissioned on Alberta's finances by Janice MacKinnon's task force, that recommended freezes and cuts that would help to reach the UCP's goal of eliminating the deficit by 2023. It focused on slashing health care costs and various measures related to the public sector, including education. The report's mandate did not include the impact of potential revenue if a provincial sales tax were introduced. By September 2019, polls showed that Premier Kenney had a 60% approval rate. The November 2019 fall budget closely followed the MacKinnon's August report's recommendations. The first presumptive COVID-19 case in Alberta was announced by Dr. Deena Hinshaw, Alberta's Chief Medical Officer of Health on March 5, 2020. On March 17, Premier Kenney declared a public health state of emergency. By the end of his first year as premier, Kenney's overall performance approval rate had dropped to 47% with the leader of the opposition rising to 46% approval rate.

During the Spring Sitting of the 1st Session of the 30th Alberta Legislature, which spanned May through July, 2019, the Kenney government passed about thirteen pieces of legislation, including the Act to Repeal the Carbon Tax, the Alberta Corporate Tax Amendment, and the Public Sector Wage Arbitration Deferral Act. Premier Kenney established a one-year $2.5 million Public Inquiry into Anti-Alberta Energy Campaigns and a Calgary-based $30 million 'war room' to "fight misinformation related to oil and gas".

Bill 32, Restoring Balance in Alberta's Workplaces Act, 2020, was introduced by Labour Minister Copping, on July 7, 2020. Minister Copping said Bill 32 will counterbalance "significant changes" made during the NDP tenure, that favoured unions at the expense of the "rights of job creators". There are numerous changes to "workplace rules and union activities" which include where and how unions can picket and an opt out option which allows union members to choose to have their "union dues go to political parties or causes."

The November 16, 2020 Leger poll, showed that support for Premier Kenney's response to the COVID-19 pandemic was at 37%, which was much lower than that of any other provincial leader. As Premier Kenney's poll numbers fell, there were signs of a potential electoral split on the right, which could contribute to the NDP winning in the next provincial election. During the UCP caucus meeting in October 2020, in a lengthy response to a question from a delegate about the potential for Alberta separating from Canada if the Liberals won another term in the 2021 Canadian federal election in 2021, Premier Kenney responded that his patriotism was to the country, Canada. By July 2020, there were two registered provincial separatist parties—the Independence Party of Alberta led by Cory Morgan, a blogger and columnist for the Western Standard, and the Wildrose Independence Party of Alberta, established in July 2020 with the merger of the Wexit Alberta party and the Freedom Conservative Party of Alberta with Paul Hinman as leader, and 40% of Albertans—mainly in rural Alberta—supported separation.

According to a 2022 investigative report by journalists Charles Rusnell and Jennie Russell and based on interviews with UCP staffers, both current and former, the efforts made by the office of the premier to "stymie transparency and accountability...are unlike anything they have seen in their many combined years working for other governments". This included a systemic and regular email deletion protocol called "records management".

=== Carbon price and carbon tax ===
As promised in his election platform, Premier Kenney's first piece of legislation was Bill 1: An Act to Repeal the Carbon Tax, which had been put into place in November 2015 during the premiership of Rachel Notley. Premier Kenney was one of four provincial premiers that challenged the constitutionality of Canada's carbon tax. Kenney has loudly "denounced" carbon taxes and threatened "more legal action" after a Saskatchewan superior court dismissed the legal "challenge of the constitutionality of the federal carbon tax." Both Ford and Kenney were strongly critical of carbon taxes saying they will "either trigger a recession or sink the oil patch," according to an October 10, 2019 article in The National Observer. Premier Kenney had said that Climate Leadership Plan introduced by Rachel Notley "crippled the Alberta economy." This claim was refuted by the November 15, 2019 Government of Alberta report, "Economic Assessment of Climate Policy in Alberta," which was submitted by the Kenney's government as a court document to the Alberta Court of Appeal, as part of Alberta's constitutional challenge of the federal government's carbon tax. The Alberta government's "own analysis" revealed that Notley's carbon tax economic effect was "an average reduction in annual growth of Alberta's gross domestic product (GDP) of only 0.05%."

=== Carbon price ===
In December 2019, the federal government accepted Kenney's Technology Innovation and Emissions Reduction (TIER) Bill 19 legislation—a provincial carbon tax on industrial emitters—which helps Canada reach its Paris Agreement goals. Industrial emitters will pay "$30 per tonne of emissions" with an estimated reduction in emissions of "32 megatonnes in 2030." The funds collected will go towards "deficit reduction and technological advancements with respect to climate change." There is no carbon tax on consumers.

=== Public Inquiry into Anti-Alberta Energy Campaigns ===
On July 4, 2019, Premier Kenney announced a one-year $2.5 million Public Inquiry into Anti-Alberta Energy Campaigns. The inquiry will include interviews, research, and potentially, public hearings. Kenney announced the creation of the public inquiry along with the "Energy War Room" in a release by the UCP party during his election campaign. Kenney cited "the intrepid reporting of journalist Vivian Krause," who has spent ten years examining foreign funding of Canadian environmental non-profit organizations (ENGOs).

In a talk at Manhattan Institute on September 12, 2018, "The Real Fuel of the Future: Natural Gas", Kenney said that there were "domestic economic benefits from an expanded shale gas industry," but there was a "potential American upset of the former hegemony in global gas trade." Kenney said that these "fake accounts advocated for 'the complete abandonment of specific fuel sources, such as fossil fuels, by touting exaggerated claims about alternative energy sources,' while sometimes both promoting and mocking climate change, all intended to “generate further domestic [U.S.] controversy."

Minister Schweitzer appointed a forensic accountant, Steve Allan, as commissioner of the Public Inquiry, which is tasked with investigating foreign-funded efforts to undermine the oil and gas industry. In November 2019, CBC News reported that Allan, and "two other business associates" had supported and/or campaigned for Schweitzer in 2018 and 2019, and that Allan had awarded sole-source contracts for them after he was appointed to the $290,000 job as Commissioner. In response to a request for an investigation into a violation of Alberta's Conflicts of Interest Act, in July 2020, Alberta's ethics commissioner Marguerite Trussler found that Minister Schweitzer did not breach the Act when he appointed Allan. In July 2019, shortly after his appointment as chair of the Public Inquiry, Allan had awarded a $905,000 sole-source contract for the inquiry to the Calgary law firm, Dentons Canada LLP, where he was a former partner, and where, Toby Allen, Allan's son is a "partner and his good friend, Quincy Smith, also works", according to the Canadian Press (CP), and other media sources. In her ruling Trussler said, "It does stretch credibility that Mr. Allan did not consider whether or not there may possibly be a conflict of interest in his engaging of Dentons as counsel for the inquiry, given that, for all intents and purposes, the firm gave him free office space and both his close friend (although that alone is not significant) and his son were partners at the firm...[However], [n]either the minister, his children, nor his direct associates had any personal or particular interest in, or anything to gain from, the appointment of Mr. Allan as inquiry commissioner".

In September 2019, Vancouver-based Ecojustice issued a letter of warning of potential legal challenge to commissioner Allan asking for a response within 30 days. On July 27, 2020, Ecojustice requested that the Court of Queen's Bench of Alberta stop the Public Inquiry into Anti-Alberta Energy Campaigns until the court gave its ruling on their November judicial review application.

The University of Calgary's Martin Olszynski and Shaun Fluker from the Faculty of Law, raised concerns about the Alberta Inquiry "from the perspective of the rule of law and procedural fairness." Their colleagues said that the Inquiry could unjustifiably violate the "freedom of expression of the Canadian organizations it is aimed at as well as those associated with such organizations, including their members and supporters."

On June 25, Minister Savage announced that the deadline for the Public Inquiry's final report has been extended to October 30, 2020, from July 2 and that the Inquiry's budget has been increased from $2.5 million to $3.5 million. The added funds will be diverted from the Canadian Energy Centre's budget.

Commissioner Allen provided inquiry participants with several reports funded and commissioned by the Public Inquiry and a reading list, which included False Alarm: How Climate Change Costs Us Trillions, Hurts the Poor, and Fails to Fix the Climate by Bjørn Lomborg, and Apocalypse Never: Why Environmental Alarmism Hurts Us All by Michael Shellenberger. Both Lomborg and Shellenberger are climate change denialists. The commissioned readings include a 133-page report by United Kingdom-based historian, Tammy Lynn Nemeth—the "Nemeth Report", an Energy in Depth report entitled "Foreign Funding Targeting Canada's Energy Sector", and a background paper—the "Cooper Report" by Barry Cooper, a University of Calgary political scientist professor and key member of the Friends of Science.

=== Energy war room ===
In June 2019, Premier Kenney announced the creation of a Calgary-based $30 million 'war room' to "fight misinformation related to oil and gas." In an October 9, 2019 press release, Minister Savage announced the appointment of former journalist and lobbyist Tom Olsen as CEO and managing director of the war room which will be called the Canadian Energy Centre Limited (CECL).

The Canadian Energy Centre Limited is a private corporation, which means that it is not subject to Alberta's Freedom of Information and Protection of Privacy Act (FOIP Act). Premier Kenney's press secretary Christine Myatt said that keeping CECL's internal operations secret is a "tactical and/or strategic advantage to the very foreign-funded special interests the CEC is looking to counter."

CEC's board of directors is composed of Minister Savage, Minister of Justice and Solicitor General, Doug Schweitzer, and Jason Nixon, Minister of Environment and Parks.

The Canadian Energy Centre (CEC) was launched on December 11 by Premier Kenney, Minister Savage and Olsen at a press conference at the Southern Alberta Institute of Technology (SAIT). The CEC will "highlight achievements in Alberta's oil and gas sector" and will "refute what it deems to be misinformation about the industry." Kenney said the centre will "counter misinformation" "coming from some environmental groups and others seeking to landlock Alberta's oil and gas". On December 11, Olsen described the centre as a place to tell the story of the oil and gas industry in Alberta, which includes rebutting its critics respectfully.

A December 14 Medicine Hat News opinion piece, that was critical of the CEC, said that the centre was not "subject to freedom-of-information searches and could be used to stifle legitimate dissent and commentary on the oil and gas industry." In his December 18 rebuttal, Olson, who is a former Calgary Herald journalist, said that "oversight" of the CEC is "rigorous" and that the centre is subject to the Fiscal Planning and Transparency Act, the Whistle Blowers Act and audits by Alberta's auditor general. Olsen said that "campaigns to shut down new pipeline projects and damage the reputation of our oil and gas industry have received tens of millions of dollars from U.S. environmental foundations." This has resulted in the "landlocking of Alberta energy" which had resulted in the loss of jobs, "tens of billions of dollars" in capital, less money for public services, as well as "lower value for their shareholders that include many of the country's biggest pension plans and investment funds."

The CEC logo, which was unveiled at the launch, was also used in the December 11 promotional video, on the CEC's website, "on the wall of its downtown Calgary office, and on signs". By the evening of December 18, "social media users" on Twitter began to share side-by-side versions of the CEC logo and the "trademarked symbol" for Progress Software Corporation, the Massachusetts-headquartered "software giant"—Progress Software, A December 19 Canadian Press report said that the icons were "identical, stylized sharp-angled depictions of what appear to be radiating waves... the Progress one is emerald-green and the war room version is two shades of blue." According to a CP report, the Massachusetts-headquartered "software giant"—Progress Software sent an email that morning saying that it was "looking into whether Alberta's new energy war room has violated the company's trademarked logo."

In a December 19 statement, the energy centre's CEO and managing director, Tom Olsen, said that the logo was pulled and was to be replaced. Olsen said that the "design debacle" "mistake" was an "unfortunate situation". He said that the CEC was in "discussions" with the marketing agency—Lead & Anchor "to determine how it happened". The CEC had selected Lead & Anchor over eight other contractors proposed to the CEC by the Calgary marketing agency, Communo.

Steven Lee, the founder of the Foundation for Environmental Stewardship (FES) became the first to be "scrutinized by the centre". Lee was criticized in a December 10 post entitled "Alberta father irked by charity group that targets fossil fuel industry" that was posted on the newly launched CEC website. An irate parent was concerned about the presentation and the Three Percent Project handout given to his fifteen-year-old son at his Airdrie, Alberta school on December 5, 2019. Lee received a phone message from a caller saying, "I'm a reporter with the Canadian Energy Centre. Our website is launching next week and we will be writing a story about the 3% Project, which has raised concerns among some parents who reached out to us following presentations at their children's schools." The 3% Project is a "flagship project" of FES, established by then-19-year-old Steve Lee in 2012.

On June 25, 2020, Minister Savage announced that a million dollars would be transferred from the CEC's budget to that of the Public Inquiry into Anti-Alberta Energy Campaigns.

In March 2021, the government-funded war room launched a petition against Netflix's Bigfoot Family, a cartoon for children because it was "brainwashing our kids with anti-oil and gas propaganda." Kenney defended the petition, saying the cartoon attempts to "defame, in the most vicious way possible, in the impressionable minds of kids, the largest industry in the province." University of Alberta's Andrew Leach, said the war room's "quixotic crusade" was "mind-boggling".

=== Fair Deal panel ===
On November 9, 2019, in a speech at the Manning Centre in Red Deer, Premier Kenney announced the creation of a Fair Deal panel, to respond to the "frustration, the anger, and even the fear felt by many Albertans and other Western Canadians, arising from our current circumstances within the Canadian federation." Panel member, Jason Goodstriker, who died in January 2020, had previously served as the Alberta Regional Chief for the Assembly of First Nations and was also a councillor with the Kainai Nation. On March 16, when the report was submitted there were eight members on the Panel—Oryssia Lennie, a retired civil servant, who chaired the Panel, Preston Manning, former premier Peter Lougheed's son, Stephen Lougheed, former MLA Donna Kennedy-Glans, Moin Yahya, and UCP MLAs, Drew Barnes, Tany Yao, and Miranda Rosin.

==== Equalization payments in Canada ====
Among other things, Kenney had demanded "reforms to the equalization formula."

CBC News reported on May 16 that the panel had submitted its final report. Kenney said that he would not release either the report or the province's response to the public, until "the worst of the COVID-19 pandemic is over."

The 64-page report made 25 recommendations that would, if implemented remove some control from the federal government, which includes pushing for changes to the Fiscal Stabilization Program that respond to concerns that Albertans are now "receiving a $2.4 billion equalization rebate." The panel advised the province to "proceed with the proposed referendum on equalization," to replace the Royal Canadian Mounted Police (RCMP) in rural Alberta with a provincial police force, to create an Alberta Pension Plan to replace and withdraw from the Canada Pension Plan. An article in the Calgary Herald and in The Tyee said that these ideas were introduced in the Firewall Letter sent to then-premier Ralph Klein on January 24, 2001, from Stephen Harper, who was then president of the National Citizens Coalition at that time; University of Calgary professors—Tom Flanagan, Ted Morton and Rainer Knopff; Andrew Crooks, then-chair of the Canadian Taxpayers Federation; and Ken Boessenkool, who had previously served as Stockwell Day's former policy adviser. A 2015 National Post article summarizes the Firewall Letter as a plea for Albertans to insulate themselves against an "increasingly hostile government in Ottawa." Proposals in the letter included "creating a provincial pension plan (like the QPP); a provincial police force (like the SQ or OPP); collecting its own provincial income tax (as Quebec does); forcing Senate reform back on to the national agenda; and taking over complete provincial responsibility for health care."

=== Public sector wages ===
On June 20, 2019, the Public Sector Wage Arbitration Deferral Act (Bill 9)—informally known as the "bargaining rights bill was passed into law. Bill 9 was introduced by Minister Toews in order to "suspend and delay" hearings related to wage arbitration for public sector workers until after the MacKinnon panel report was submitted. is a bill, informally known as the "bargaining rights bill". The bill affected Alberta's 180,000 public service employees represented by unions in 24 collective agreements.

=== United Nurses of Alberta (UNA) ===
In January 2020, the United Nurses of Alberta (UNA) started a collective bargaining process. On July 7, 2021, Finance Minister Toews said that Alberta Health Services was asking for a 3% salary rollback for nurses as part of the negotiation process. Toews said that the government "The needs to "bring wages in line with other large provinces" as nurses in Alberta earn approximately 5.6% "more on average than comparable provinces". He said that, this "does not diminish our deep respect for the exceptional work and dedication of public sector workers." The UNA negotiator said that, "Every profession in Alberta is paid higher than comparator provinces — we used to call that the Alberta advantage."

=== Corporate tax lowered ===
The Alberta government has set a goal of balancing the budget by 2022–2023. As part of Premier Kenney's "main strategy to lure investment to the province, stimulate job growth, and resurrect the oilpatch" promised during his electoral campaign in their April 2019 campaign platform "Alberta Strong and Free," on June 28, 2019, the Job Creation Tax Cut (Alberta Corporate Tax Amendment) Act (Bill 3), introduced by Minister Toews, came into law. Bill 3 included further reductions in Alberta's corporate tax rate in four stages to lower the "corporate tax rate for all businesses, from 12 to 8% by 2022-23". The first cut from 12 to 11% came into effect on July 1. The second cut of 10% will come into effect in January 2020; a third decrease of 9% on January 1, 2021, and a fourth cut of 8% cut that come into effect on January 1, 2022. Toews repeated the campaign pledge when he announced Bill 13, saying that the "cuts should create at least 55,000 jobs in Alberta". As well the Alberta's revised tax rates —will increase the province's "international competitiveness" as they will be lower than those of 44 out of 50 American states, according to Toews. According to an October 26, 2019 CBC News article, when Bill 3 "came into effect on July 1, it gave Alberta the lowest corporate tax rate in Canada." Bill 3 "formalizes" one of the UCP's election promises. Several economists were cited by the UCP in their April 2019 Alberta Strong and Free Platform, including Jack Mintz, Bev Dahlby, and Aaron Stokes of Stokes Economics. Mintx said that the tax cuts would "lead to the creation of at least 55,000 full-time private sector jobs". Dahlby estimated that the cuts would "generate a $12.7 billion increase in nominal GDP", a "6.5% increase in per capita real GDP", and a "$1.2 billion in additional government revenues by 2023-24." The Stokes analysis predicted the "cut will result in $1 billion less net revenue for the province by 2022-23." On March 4, 2019, the UCP had announced their intention to cut corporate taxes by one third with a prediction of adding $13 billion to Alberta's economy.

On January 1, 2021, the UCP's corporation tax will drop to 9% on New Year's Day 2021 and 8% in 2022, which would represent the "lowest rate in Canada by a 30 per cent margin".

The UCP's Job Creation Tax Cut was intended to lead to the "creation of at least 55,000 new jobs, according to economist Jack Mintz. Since 2009, the unemployment rate in Alberta hit its lowest point—4.3%—in September 2013 and its highest—9.1%—in November 2016. Alberta had experienced boom years in the energy sector starting in 2010, but this boom was followed by a "long and deep" recession that lasted from 2014 to 2017—driven by both low commodity pricing globally and controversial political policies from both the Provincial and Federal Government. When the UCP government were elected in the spring of 2019, Alberta's economy was still in recovery. Overall, by July 2019, about 35,000 jobs had been lost in mining, oil and gas alone. Since 2014, sectors that offered high-wage employment of $30 and above, saw about 100,000 jobs disappear—"construction (down more than 45,000 jobs), mining, oil and gas (down nearly 35,000), and professional services (down 18,000)," according to the economist, Trevor Tombe. In 2013, oil tax revenues brought in 9.58 billion, or 21% of the total Provincial budget, whereas in 2018 it had fallen to just 5.43 billion, or 11% of the Provincial budget. In 2013, the energy industry had provided 7.7% of all jobs in Alberta. In 2017, 140,300 jobs representing 6.1% of total employment of 2,286,900 in Alberta in 2017 was due to the energy industry. The unemployment rate in Alberta peaked in November 2016 at 9.1%. The unemployment rate in the spring of 2019 in Alberta was 6.7% with 21,000 jobs added in April. By July 2019, the seasonally adjusted unemployment rate had increased to 7.0% and remained at about that level since then. By August 2019, the employment number in Alberta was 2,344,000, following the loss of 14,000 full-time jobs in July, which represented the "largest decline" in Canada according to Statistics Canada. According to Statistics Canada, in November, Alberta lost 18,000 jobs and the unemployment rate was 7.2%, "with declines occurring in a number of industries, led by wholesale and retail trade. On a year-over-year basis, total employment in the province was little changed." As UCP popularity declined considerably by December 2019, the polling agency, ThinkHQ Public Affairs Inc., said that "governments tend to get more blame for the economy when times are tough than they do credit when times are good."

=== Economic Recovery Council (March–June 2020) ===
In March 2020, Premier Kenney created the twelve member Economic Recovery Council composed of policy and industry experts, to advise the government in responding to the COVID-19 pandemic and the energy price crash. Jack M. Mintz chairs the twelve member committee. Council members include Clive Beddoe, who served as WestJet's CEO and who was co-founder of AIMco serving on its board from until 2013, AIMCo's CEO Kevin Uebelein, Robert Blakely, TorQuest Partners' Brent Belzberg, Mainstreet Equity Corporation's Bob Dhillon, Canadian Western Bank's Chris Fowler, Rt. Hon. Stephen Harper, former Prime Minister of Canada, Morgan Construction and Environmental's Peter Kiss, ATCO's Nancy Southern, ARC Financial's Mac Van Wielingen, and Zainul Mawji, who is on the executive board of Telus Corporation. As president of Telus Home Solutions, Mawji focused on increasing the market share in Canada's western provinces, and the Telus "consumer health product line." The Council "will also focus on strategies for long-term recovery from the crisis, including efforts to accelerate diversification of the Alberta economy."

On June 29, 2020, when Premier Kenney outlined his plans for economic growth, he said that the Economic Recovery Council had "urged the government to act quickly" to get "out of the economic slump caused by low oil prices and the COVID-19 pandemic." The council told Kenney that, "Now is the time to make a move, to get noticed...The fiscal crisis here will be completely insurmountable unless we get back to growth. For us, this is the key strategy to do so."

The plan included infrastructure investment in "highways, bridges and other projects". It also eliminating most "use of temporary foreign workers to ensure Albertans are first in line for jobs."

The plan included lowering the corporate tax rate to 8% from 10% on July 1, instead of in 2023 as he had originally announced in 2019. Concerns were raised that the immediate implementation of the corporate tax cut to 8%, two years earlier instead of phasing it in over time, is a "gift to firms that have already made investments and are earning profits on those investments". It will not attract new job-creating businesses, as it is not "new information for anybody in Bay Street plotting a big move of employees that would take years."

=== Blue Ribbon Panel on Alberta's Finances ===
In August 2019, Janice MacKinnon's task force submitted the report commissioned by Premier Kenney, "Report and Recommendations: Blue Ribbon Panel on Alberta's Finances". According to Maclean's, Premier Kenney had "mandated" that the panel "figure out how to balance the provincial books without raising taxes." McKinnon, who was Saskatchewan's finance minister, found that "Alberta spends more per person on its public sector, and compensates its teachers, doctors and other workers more generously, than other major provinces." The panel recommended that the post-secondary tuition freeze be lifted, and suggested "various measures to slash health-care costs and government-wide program reviews."

== 2019 Budget ==
On October 24, 2019, Minister Toews announced the UCP's first provincial budget. The National Post said that it fulfilled their "promise of slight austerity" with "cuts to spending programs and the elimination of hundreds of bureaucracy jobs". The Post said that these and the corporate tax cuts "were the key planks of a four-year plan to bring the budget into balance." The goal is to reduce government spending by $4-billion over four years. The 2019-20 budget will "run a deficit of $8.7 billion" which is approximately "$2-billion higher than in 2018-19." The Post said that the changes in post-secondary education were "significant" with a 12-per-cent funding cut. and a reduction in "government grants to post-secondary institutions". Together that represents a $1.9 billion in cuts in post-secondary education. Post-secondary institutions will be allowed to increase tuition. The Alberta government has set a goal of balancing the budget by 2022–2023.

The UCP's budget decision to de-index disability benefits met with outrage, according to The Star. Many people were "vocal about their disdain surrounding the UCP's decision to reverse the Assured Income for the Severely Handicapped (AISH)’s tie to inflation", including Arlene Dickinson, formerly with the Dragon's Den. There are currently approximately 70,000 Albertans who receive AISH.

On October 28, the Minister Toews introduced Bill 20, an omnibus bill which included a clause through which the government of Alberta could withdraw the $1.53-billion grant it had promised for Calgary's Green Line "with just 90 days' notice and without cause."

Minister Toews introduced a second omnibus bill, Bill 21, on October 28, as part of his budget that allows the provincial government to "cancel its master agreement with doctors if the two sides can't negotiate a new deal." In an October 30 open letter to all members of the Alberta Medical Association, Dr. Christine Molnar, AMA director, said that the "bill effectively gives government the power of pre-approval to cancel any physician services agreement without recourse. This is a violation of the sanctity of contracts." The bill would also give the government control over where new doctors can work starting in March 2022, in order to provide better service to rural areas.

According to an October 31, 2019 CBC News article, the UCP is "working off" August 2019, Janice MacKinnon's August 2019 "Report and Recommendations: Blue Ribbon Panel on Alberta's Finances".

== 2020 Budget ==
Minister Toews tabled the UCP's second provincial budget on February 27, 2020. Toews said that the $CDN56.8 billion budget is based on an "anticipated 38 per cent increase in energy royalties." The increased energy royalties depends heavily on the success of the UCP's corporate tax rate cuts to spur revenue growth through an infusion of capital from private investment and the resulting expansion in both "oil production and pipeline capacity." The only other revenue streams in this budget are "a vaping tax and the extension of a tourism levy on short-term rentals." David Taras, a political scientist from Mount Royal University said that this budget signaled that the UCP was "not blinking"—They are "sticking with [their game plan] the "policy of cuts and deficit reduction in the face of what appears to be a province that's bleeding jobs."

The budget included a proposed 10-year strategy intended to increase tourism spending to $20 billion by 2030, which a Ministry of Economic Development, Trade and Tourism spokesperson said was "ambitious but reasonable". "Only $45 million of the overall ministry budget is [currently] dedicated to tourism" and millions were cut from the tourism budget in this and previous budgets. The Tourism Industry Association of Alberta chair said that this "audacious" plan does not "reflect" the "conversations" held during the "pre-budget planning sessions" the government had with "hundreds of industry professionals" in Calgary and Edmonton to "discuss recommendations with the government on how to boost the tourism industry." Province-wide, the budget cut $53 million from 2020 through 2023, from affordable housing maintenance.

The budget increases homeowners' education property taxes by 3.1% in 2020–2021, which the government predicts will add revenue of "$102 million to a total of $2.6 billion."

Operational funding of $8.2 billion for kindergarten to Grade 12 education will remain at 2019 levels, in spite of population growth and inflation.

The $20.6 billion budgeted for health received the same criticism from the Opposition party.

In their February 28, 2020 report, Moody's Investors Service said that the 2020 budget was credit neutral. According to Moody's, the UCP fiscal plan is subject to "significant uncertainties, driven by weak resource sector investments and pipeline projects which are subject to regulatory, political, and other types of delays, much of which is beyond the control of the government."

By April 7, 2020, a combination of interconnected unprecedented global events—including the 2020 coronavirus pandemic, the COVID-19 recession, the 2020 stock market crash, and the 2020 Russia–Saudi Arabia oil price war and the resulting "collapse in oil prices", represent, what Premier Kenney described as "the greatest challenge" in Alberta's "modern history, threatening its main industry and wreaking havoc on its finances."

== Alberta's credit rating ==
On December 3, 2019, Moody's downgraded Alberta's credit rating from Aa2 stable from Aa1 negative. According to Mount Royal University's political science professor, Duane Bratt, factors influencing the downgrade include the UCP's budget plan that led to an increase in the deficit and concerns about labour unrest with thousands of public sector jobs set to be eliminated. Moody's report said that Alberta's economy's "structural weakness" lies in its concentration and dependency on non-renewable resources (NNRs) combined with a "lack of sufficient pipeline capacity to transport oil efficiently," "no near-term expectation of a significant rebound in oil-related investments," and "revenue pressures related to UCP cuts to corporate tax rates." Minister Toews blamed the downgrade on the NDP's tenure, during which the province had also experienced a credit rating downgrade, from its very high credit rating of AAA to Aa1. Premier Kenney said in an interview that " financial institutions — and this apparently includes Moody's — are buying into the political agenda emanating from Europe, which is trying to stigmatize development of hydrocarbon energy." The October 9, 2020 Moody's Investor Service report downgraded Alberta's credit rating to Aa3 (stable) reflecting "outsized deficits" resulting from the "dual impact of continued low oil prices and the coronavirus pandemic". Strengths included its "supportive institutional framework including ongoing and extraordinary federal transfers", which Moody's expects will increase to represent 20-25% of Alberta's total revenues in 2021 and 2022.

With Premier Kenney's June 29, 2020 announcement of the accelerated decrease in the corporate tax rate, Finance Minister Toews said that the cuts and "financial supports could jeopardize" Alberta's credit rating. Towes said that the estimated cost of the tax cut would range from $200 million to $300 million in FY 2020 and $100 million and $200 million in FY2021. Canada's credit rating was downgraded from AAA by Fitch, which is one of the three largest credit agencies in the United States.

On June 30, 2020, Fitch downgrading Alberta's Long-Term Foreign Currency Issuer Default Rating (IDR), Long-Term Local Currency IDR, and Senior unsecured bonds from 'AA' to 'AA−'. Fitch also affirmed that Alberta's Short-Term IDR is 'F1+.' As well, Alberta's Rating Outlook on the long-term ratings was revised from Stable to Negative. The ratings consider Alberta's stimulus plan which was announced on June 30 which included the "acceleration of certain capital projects" without giving "details on plan impacts to revenues, expenditures and debt issuance." The higher risk rating was also informed by the lack of "formally detailed current fiscal challenges" and "firm details on a path toward an eventual recovery", which could lead to "further deterioration in credit quality."

== Ministry of Energy ==
Sonya Savage, whose background in energy and the environment includes major projects, such as the Enbridge Northern Gateway Pipelines and with her work as an executive of Canadian Energy Pipeline Association (CEPA), was appointed Minister of Energy on April 30, 2019. She is tasked with overhauling the Alberta Energy Regulator (AER)—one of the UCP's campaign promises with the aim of implementing "shorter timelines for project approvals." On April 30, the UCP proclaimed Bill 12 which gives "Alberta the power to restrict oil and gas exports to British Columbia. According to the Calgary Herald, this "could provoke a quick court challenge" the Premier of British Columbia, John Horgan. On April 30, Premier Kenney "pragmatically backed away" from the campaign promise to "remove the 100-megatonne cap on oilsands emissions." According to the Calgary Herald, Bill C-48 regarding an "oil tanker ban off the northern coast of British Columbia" threatened the proposed Enbridge Northern Gateway Pipelines project that Savage had worked on. She was also involved in "CEPA's examination of Bill C-69, Ottawa's overhaul of how major energy projects — including oil and gas pipelines — are reviewed by the federal government."

In February 2019, the previous government signed a crude-by-rail program agreement with two railway companies—and the Canadian Pacific Railway (CPR) Canadian National Railway (CNR) with a goal of reducing the Western Canadian Select price discount that has been exacerbated by the "lack of pipeline capacity". Through the four-year, $3.7-billion agreement the "province would have purchased and shipped 120,000 barrels of crude a day." The NDP had estimated that the program would have generated "revenue of $6-billion", according to The Globe and Mail. The Kenney government cancelled the agreement shortly after taking office because the "financial risks were too high". By the end of October 2019 Minister Savage was in ongoing negotiations with the railways related to the "number and complexity of the contracts." In November, 2019 Premier Kenney visited Texas in a four-day trip to create more investment in Alberta's oil and gas industry.

A The Globe and Mail article said, "A single talisman has defined Jason Kenney's time as premier of Alberta: oil." Kenney campaigned on supporting the oil and gas industries and expanding the pipeline system. By 2018, "chronic pipeline bottlenecks" and as a result "industry and governments millions of dollars a day in lost revenue." Following the December 2 announcement of mandatory oil production cut backs in Alberta, the price of WCS rose to c.US$26.65 a barrel. The differential between Western Canadian Select—the benchmark price for Alberta heavy crude—and West Texas Intermediate (WTI)—which had averaged at US$17 for the decade from 2008 to 2018—widened to a record of around US$50, and the price of WCS plummeted to US$5.90. In response, the NDP government under then-Premier Rachel Notley, had set temporary mandatory production limits which resulted in the price of WCS rose to c.US$26.65 a barrel.

On March 24, 2020, as the price of oil plunged more than 5%, federal Finance Minister Bill Morneau announced a program to help the oil industry which would include a "backstop for banks that lend to the energy sector." The price of oil of WCS collapsed and descended to negative pricing by April 19, 2020. From June 2020 to June 2021, the price of WCS increased by $USD40 a barrel to $USD54.78. According to economist Trevor Tombe in June 2021, the unexpected increase in the price of oil "alone could lead to five or six billion dollars in additional revenue" for the Alberta" to alleviate some of the pressure of the projected $18-billion deficit which is projected. Tombe said that "Each day that oil prices remain at their current level that's worth somewhere between $10 million to $15 million to the Alberta budget."

=== TC Energy Keystone XL ===
By March 31, 2020, the "federal government had already bought Trans Mountain" and was "committed to getting it built" and Enbridge's Line 3 was making progress. In what Kenney described as a "bold move to retake control of our province's economic destiny", the province agreed to help finance the construction of TC Energy's Keystone XL oil sands pipeline in southern Alberta, Montana, South Dakota and Nebraska with "agreements for the transport of 575,000 barrels of oil daily". The New York Times reported that "[d]espite plunging oil prices" in March", Kenney said the "province's resource-dependent economy could not afford for Keystone XL to be delayed until after the coronavirus pandemic and a global economic downturn have passed." Alberta "has agreed to invest approximately $1.1 billion US as equity in the project, which substantially covers planned construction costs through the end of 2020. The remaining $6.9 billion US is expected to be funded through a combination of a $4.2-billion project-level credit facility to be fully guaranteed by the Alberta government and a $2.7-billion investment by TC Energy." Kenney has said that the Keystone XL will create "1,400 direct and 5,400 indirect jobs in Alberta during construction and will reap an estimated $30 billion in tax and royalty revenues for both Alberta and Canada over the next twenty years. TC Energy "expects to buy back the Alberta government's investment and refinance the $4.2 billion loan" when the 1,200-mile (1,930-kilometer) pipeline is operational starting in 2023. Keystone XL will add up to 830,000 bpd from Western Canada to Steele City, Nebraska. From there it connects to "other pipelines that feed oil refineries on the U.S. Gulf Coast." According to the Canadian Energy Regulator, in 2018, Alberta produced 3.91 million bpd of crude oil, which represents 82% of the total production in Canada. According to a March 31, 2020 article in The New York Times, because of Kenney, Russ Girling, TC Energy CEO, announced that construction of its $8-billion US Keystone XL oil sands pipeline's Canada-United States border crossing, in rural northeast Montana, would begin in April in spite of the COVID-19 pandemic. Concerns were raised by the office of the Montana's Governor, Steve Bullock about the added strain on "rural health resources during the coronavirus pandemic", with the arrival of a hundred or more pipeline construction workers in rural Montana. At the time of the announcement northeastern Montana had only one confirmed COVID-19 case. In a May 20 interview on the Canadian Association of Oilwell Drilling Contractors (CAODC) podcast, Minister Savage told the podcast host, John Bavil, that Green party leader, Elizabeth May's May 6 comment that "oil is dead" was not "gaining resonance with ordinary Canadians" because Canadians need oil. "Canadians are just trying to get by." Savage added that Canadians were "not going to have tolerance and patience for protests that get in the way of people working", and that the "economic turmoil caused by the COVID-19 pandemic favours pipeline construction", according to Canadian Press journalist, Bob Weber. Savage told Bavil that "Now is a great time to be building a pipeline because you can't have protests of more than 15 people...Let's get it built." The comment received wide media coverage. On June 9, 2021, TC Energy announced the termination of the US$9 billion Keystone XL pipeline project. U.S. President Joe Biden had "revoked a key permit" that was crucial to the pipeline.

The Financial Post reported on July 7, 2021, that Premier Kenney intends to join TC Energy in their $15 billion North American Free Trade Agreement (NAFTA) Chapter 11 claim against the US over the cancellation of the Keystone XL pipeline, "to recover damages resulting from the revocation of the Keystone XL project's presidential permit." The Post said that this "would be the first time a level of government is directly involved in a NAFTA dispute as an investor." Citing an international trade lawyer, the article said that "these types of cases generally drag on for years". The legal challenge is "daunting"; the "United States has never lost a Chapter 11 free trade case...It will be a long, expensive and challenged by the unlimited resources of the United States government." A law professor interviewed by the Post said that Alberta's claim is "unclear" since the province only became an investor in early 2020. Claims are baed on the period in which you were an investor.

=== Orphan wells ===
As part of Government of Canada's COVID-19 Economic Response Plan, the federal government announced on May 1, 2020, that up to $1.72 billion will go to the governments of Alberta and the Alberta Orphan Well Association—as well as Saskatchewan and British Columbia—to "clean up" orphan wells and "inactive oil and gas infrastructure". According to the Alberta provincial government, Alberta's Site Rehabilitation Program "will access up to $1 billion" of the federal government's COVID-19 Plan. By May 20, Alberta had already received 24, 000 applications.

=== Grassy Mountain coal project ===
Premier Kenney rescinded the 1976 Coal Policy on June 1, 2020, and lifted restrictions on coal mining exploration and development on large areas of environmentally sensitive land. The Grassy Mountain Coal Project was a 2,800-hectare mountain top removal open-pit metallurgical coal mine in Rocky Mountains' Crowsnest Pass in southern Alberta, proposed by a large Australian mining company—Benga Mining Limited (Benga)—in 2014. The project's critics, including well-known country singers Corb Lund and Paul Brandt, said that it threatened the region's watersheds with selenium poisoning. Opponents of the Grassy Mountain project included local ranchers, some of whom began a "Save Our Mountains" campaign and formed the Livingstone Landowners Group. The Group commissioned a comprehensive report by land use ecologist Brad Stelfoxon and five other scientists, to "model the impacts of proposed projects on water security in an arid county." The report found that "even limited coking coal mining would create intractable problems with water quality and quantity, including selenium contamination." In a June 17, 2021 joint statement, Ministers Savage and Nixon acknowledged acceptance of the recommendations of the federal-provincial Joint Review Panel, which had denied approval of the Grassy Mountain coal project.

=== Sturgeon Refinery ===
According to a July 6, 2021 announcement by Kenney, the government of Alberta has acquired North West Redwater Partnership's equity stake in the "over-budget and behind-schedule" $10-billion Sturgeon Refinery, an 80,000 bbl/d (13,000 m^{3}/d) crude oil upgrader in Sturgeon County northeast of Edmonton, representing 50% of the $10-billion project, with the other 50% owned by Canadian Natural Resources. The province is now a co-owner with Canadian Natural Resources, which also owns 50% of the refinery.

== Ministry of Justice ==
In February 2020, against the backdrop of anti-pipeline rail blockades, Teck Resources "withdrew its application to build the $20-billion Frontier oilsands mine in Alberta. In response, on February 25, Alberta Justice Minister Doug Schweitzer announced the tabling of the Critical Infrastructure Defence Act (Bill 1), which will "impose stiff new penalties for anyone who purposefully blocks critical infrastructure including railways and roadways." The Bill was in its 3rd reading in May 2020. By mid-June opposition to the legislation "continued to grow". This included an "online petition to withdraw the legislation" with 350,000 signatures. Some University of Calgary law professors critiqued Bill 1, saying that it violated freedom of expression, peaceful assembly, association, the "right to liberty, and the right to equality".

On April 29, 2020, Minister Schweitzer "rescinded the appointments of seven public members" of the Provincial Court Nominating Committee (PCNC)—a committee that vets court judges in Alberta. Currently, Alberta's PCNC is composed of "eight government appointees and three ex-officio members". Schweitzer appointed Leighton Grey, Harvey Cenaiko, Pat Nelson, Christa Nicholson, and David Ross to a three-year term, to replace Mona Duckett, as well as Lise Gotell, Anne Wilson, Kanchana Fernando, and Linda Many Guns, who had been appointed by Kathleen Ganley, the former NDP justice minister, to diversify the PCNC, according to the CBC. Leighton Grey resigned from the PCNC in June 2020, after a CBC investigation revealed his "recent comparison of a future COVID-19 vaccine to Auschwitz tattoos and posting of a video that called Black Lives Matter a "leftist lie" controlled by a Jewish philanthropist." Minister Schweitzer defended Grey, saying that PCNC members were "not required to surrender their right to personal views". In a CBC interview, the chair of Alberta's Edmonton-based Criminal Trial Lawyers' Association raised concerns about the lack of "adequate background checks", and screening candidates for PCNC membership.

Kaycee Madu, who was named as Minister of Justice and Solicitor General of Alberta on August 25, 2020, said in a statement in early October, that according to the Fair Deal Panel, Albertans want a provincial police to replace the RCMP. Madu added that the establishment of a provincial police force would also limit "Ottawa's reach into the province," which aligns with the UCP's "firewall" policy. In response to the recommendation of the Fair Deal Panel, the UCP administration hired the consulting firm, PricewaterhouseCoopers, to undertake a C$2 million feasibility study of a potential transition towards a provincial police force. An October 2 statement issued by the RCMP's Deputy Commissioner Curtis Zablocki, in response to the study, said that Alberta has 4,500 RCMP employees who work in the province and "proudly call" Alberta their home. Kathleen Ganley, New Democratic Party (NDP) justice critic, acknowledged that while there were possible merits to the proposal, she was surprised by the timing, questioning why the UCP was "pushing ahead during a pandemic." The deficit is on track to reach a "record-setting $24-billion" and "public services are under strain". A Mount Royal University professor estimated that it would cost approximately C$110 million annually and that unlike the current system with the federal government paying 30%, the provincial government would be responsible for paying the expenses of a provincial police force as well as maintaining vehicles, building, and equipment.

Energy minister Sonya Savage assumed Madu's position in an acting capacity in January 2022, during Madu's leave of absence. Premier Kenney placed Madu on leave from his cabinet position pending the conclusion of a probe into Madu's phone call to the Edmonton police chief regarding Madu's his 2021 traffic ticket.

== Ministry of Education ==
In November 2019, the Calgary Board of Education (CBE) announced it would be cutting the positions of hundreds of teachers following the UCP 2019 cuts to the education funding in the UCP's fall budget, In response, Alberta's Education Minister Adriana LaGrange said she would launch an "independent financial audit" as well as a "governance review" of the CBE. LaGrange said that the CBE had used taxpayer dollars recklessly. She said that the "audit and governance review will give government a path forward on helping the CBE prioritize the classroom and find efficiencies elsewhere in its operations." In early December LaGrange "provided a "one-time exception" on the annual $15 million "maintenance renewal funding" to the Alberta Board of Education. This allows school boards to use the funds to reverse the layoffs of 317 temporary teachers.

On June 13, 2020 Demetrios Nicolaides, Alberta's Advanced Education Minister, announced that McKinsey & Company—an American consulting firm headquartered in New York with an office in Calgary—has been commissioned to undertake a $3.7-million comprehensive review of the province's education system, including Alberta's "network of 26 institutions". Based on their findings, there could be "substantial changes starting in 2021".

== Ministry of Environment and Parks ==
On March 3, 2020, the Minister of Environment and Parks Jason Nixon said that the province could not "continue to spend $86 million of Albertans' tax dollars" on the "province's parks, recreation areas and other protected areas"—areas that bring in only $36 million. An Alberta Parks March 5 statement entitled, "Optimizing Alberta Parks", listed changes that would come into effect in 2020 as part of a cost-saving initiative. The UCP government would "fully or partially close" "20 provincial parks" and was "planning to hand over 164 others to third-party managers". The Canadian Press said that this represents "more than one-third of all the province's parks, recreation areas and other protected areas." The statement included the possibly of selling Crown land.

In response to concerns, Nixon said in a March 5 Calgary Herald interview, "We are not selling any Crown or public land — period." According to a March 17 Global News article, the province listed a 65-hectare plot of land east of Taber in a March 31 auction with a starting bid of $440,000.

According to documents released under the freedom of information legislation at the end of July 2020, Minister Nixon had been advised by "his most senior staffers" that prior to closing parks, he should have at least "two rounds of consultation". Nixon's office and communications told staff that "there would be no public input for changes" he was "planning for Alberta parks."

== Ministry for Economic Development, Trade and Tourism ==
By April 7, 2020, the Minister of Economic Development, Trade and Tourism Tanya Fir, said that the technology sector would be "a key part of diversifying Alberta's economy." Fir is reviewing recommendations in a report by an Innovation Capital Working Group, a working group of "tech sector, academic and business leaders" created by the province in December 2019, to "develop ways" to support and grow Alberta's tech sector. The UCP eliminated The Interactive Digital Media Tax Credit, the Capital Investment Tax Credit, and the Alberta Investor Tax Credit, which had provided a "30 per cent tax credit to investors who put money into specific industries such as clean technology and digital animation." Trent Johnsen, a veteran member of Alberta's tech sector, who has been involved with Innovate Calgary among others, said that Alberta was "betting exclusively on oil and gas. What is Alberta doing to become a successful player in the 21st century of the new economy?"

== Ministry of Finance ==
The Boards and Commissions and Government Enterprises Act, which was part of the November 2019 UCP budget Bill 22, presented by Finance Minister, Travis Toews, Alberta Investment Management Corporation (AIMCo) became the "investment manager of all public sector pensions". Bill 22 added the Alberta Teachers' Retirement Fund (ATRF) assets to other pension plans already managed by AIMCo. On January 4, 2021, Alberta Teachers' Retirement Fund (ATRF) was notified that Minister Toews had granted AIMCo veto power in negotiations towards an investment management agreement that began a year ago between the ATRF and AIMCo.

In November 2019, Minister Toews said that AIMCo had "provided an annual return of 9.9% on Albertans' investments" in the decade ending in 2019. By April 2020, AIMCo was managing about "$119-billion on behalf of 375,000 members of provincial public retirement programs as well as public accounts such as the province's $18-billion Heritage Savings Trust Fund." According to an April 21, 2020 Globe and Mail article, AIMCo lost over $4-billion during the coronavirus pandemic, by investing in stocks that were dependent on a stable market. This represents over a "third of AIMCo's 2019 net investment income of $11.5-billion."

On June 29, 2020, Premier Kenney and Minister Toews announced what Kenney called the "largest infrastructure build in Alberta history," representing spending of $10 billion on job-creating projects, including "health-care facilities, pipelines, schools, drug treatment centres" and more.

Under minister Toews, who resigned on May 31 to run for the leadership of the UCP, the UCP was heavily criticized for its lack of accounting in the 2019 and 2022 Office of the Auditor General (OAG) reports. In the "Alberta Treasury Board and Finance Fiscal 2021 Annual Reporting of COVID-19 Initiatives", which was released on June 29, the OAG examined the 20 ministry annual reports with a focus on "analysis and financial information".

== Ministry of Jobs, Economy and Innovation ==
In April 2022, Minister Schweitzer promised that the province would invest $66 million in the tourism sector. On May 4 Schweitzer pledged a $3.4 million annual investment in artificial intelligence project.

Alberta's unemployment rate was 5.9% in April compared to 5.8% in 2015. In April the province added 9,800 full-time and 6,100 part-time positions. Of the positions added 11,000 were in trades, 4,500 jobs in health care, 3,000 in education, 3,000 in transport and warehousing. Of the positions lost in April, building and other supports lost 4,000 positions, other services lost 4,000, and the information, culture and recreation sector lost 2,000 positions. By May 2022, unemployment rates in Wood Buffalo-Cold Lake census region were slowly decreasing with 300 more full-time jobs and 700 more part-time jobs filled in April compared to March 2022. Of these added positions, 400 were in retail and construction, 200 in health care, 200 in transportation, 200 in warehousing, 100 in financial services, 100 in real estate and 100 in insurance. Of the lost positions, 400 were in the oil industry however, 200 in public administration, 100 in business and support services. Schweitzer said that more work is needed to increase employment. The Alberta at Work program has received $600 million from the province. Kathleen Ganley, the NDP Energy Critic, said that the province has not created a "single job" in the oil and gas sector. Ganley noted that while job numbers are slowing improving, wages are not keeping up with inflation and "income taxes, property taxes, tuition, auto insurance, and utilities" have all increased under the UCP.

When Schweitzer laid off Ariella Kimmel who had served as his chief of staff at the Department of Jobs, Economy and Innovation when he was minister, he said he had no complaints about her work but he had wanted someone else in that senior position. Kimmel filed a wrongful dismissal lawsuit in 2021, in which she alleged that she had been harassed, then fired when she raised concerns that another employee had been sexually harassed by a "senior government staffer".

== Ministry of Health ==
=== Termination of master agreement with AMA (February 20, 2020) ===
On February 20, Tyler Shandro, Alberta's Minister of Health announced that he was ending the province's long-standing master agreement with Alberta's physicians. The new rules, which include "new fee rules on extended patient visits that doctors", came into effect on March 30. On April 9, the Alberta Medical Association (AMA) filed a lawsuit against the Ministry of Health citing the unilateral termination of the long-standing master agreement with the Alberta government, the "government's conduct during negotiations", and Bill 21 as "some of the reasons for filing the claim".

At the time of the announcement, doctors were concerned that these rules would make it unsustainable for some clinic in rural Alberta to remain in practice. Shandro said that ending the master agreement was "difficult but necessary" because of the need to cut costs in the "$20.6-billion health system". According to a survey of 300 doctors in Alberta, by July, 44 rural communities would be "directly affected by recent government changes to the way physicians can bill for services". By April 21, Sundre, Stettler and Lac La Biche had "already been informed some of their doctors will be withdrawing emergency and obstetric services in hospitals."

Although Minister Shandro first responded to concerns that doctors would leave rural Alberta, by promising to quickly replace them, by April 20, Shandro's press secretary acknowledged that rural communities "face long-standing challenges in recruiting and retaining physicians" and announced that they were "preparing to announce changes to support rural physicians very soon."

=== Babylon ===
In early March Minister Shandro announced an amendment to the billing code for doctors in the province, capping their fees at "$20 a call to provide COVID-19 telephone advice to patients." With physical distancing COVID-19 protocols in place, Alberta's physicians had been asking Minister Shandro to make it easier for them to provide care for their own patients virtually.

On March 16, Minister Shandro announced that the provincial government had "signed an agreement" with Telus Health, "a new virtual health care support, called the TELUS Health Babylon app—a private initiative. At that time, Alberta doctors expressed shock and dismay that the UCP government had brought in Babylon, a private initiative by Telus Health. In a March 21 interview with Postmedia, Alberta Medical Association President, Christine Molnar, said "Physicians are under extreme strain. Not only have doctors had their master agreement terminated by the province and face changes to the way they are supported financially and can provide services but they also don't have a billing code implemented that allows them to provide virtual care in their offices...On top of all that, they are facing possible — actually, certain exposure directly to a deadly virus...Physicians are feeling devalued, disenfranchised and unsupported."

On April 21, Alberta's Information and Privacy Commissioner, Jill Clayton, announced that her office was "launching two investigations" into the controversial Babylon app by Telus Health." Concerns about "privacy compliance" had emerged following the Commissioner's review of a May 2019 privacy impact assessments (PIA) submitted by Babylon Health Canada Limited and the second PIA submitted by a Calgary-area physician. Minister Shandro welcomed the review.

The Telus Babylon app was launched before Minister Shandro even requested that Clayton review the app service to ensure the privacy of Albertans was respected. At the time of its launch, doctors providing virtual services through the Telus Babylon app were receiving higher payments that Alberta doctors.

=== Bill 46 and Netcare ===
In November 2020, Minister Shandro introduced Bill 46, an omnibus bill that amends the Health Information Act, among other legislation. Bill 46 would put his office in charge of Netcare access. Concerns were raised about increasing the number of people who have access to Netcare—the electronic health records of all Albertans.

In November, when Minister Shandro again neglected to consult the Office of the Privacy Commissioner before introducing major changes through added to the Health Information Act, Clayton, who oversees the Act, expressed "shock" to learn of the proposed clauses to the Act only on the morning that the changes were made public.

=== Alberta's Insulin Pump Therapy Program ===
In May 2022, the cancellation of Alberta's Insulin Pump Therapy Program, which provides about the 4,000 Albertans with Type A diabetes with expensive and life-saving insulin pumps, was announced. The program will end in August 2022.

== Minister of Labour and Immigration ==
In May 2019, the UCP government created a two-tier minimum wage which allowed businesses to pay teen students $13 an hour starting on June 26, 2019, which Kenney had promised in March as part of his election campaign. In response to a UCP campaign pledge that questioned the hike in the minimum wage from "$10.20 in 2015 to $15 in 2018" under the NDP government, the Minister of Labour and Immigration, Jason Copping created a 9-person panel led by Joseph Marchand, a University of Alberta economist, to review minimum wage in August 2019. Critics questioned the number of panelists from industries that would benefit from having a lower minimum wage, and the presence of one waiter on the panel who was related to one of the restaurant owner panelists.

== Minister of Community and Social Services (CSS) ==
According to a September 12 Calgary Herald based on a Postmedia report, a senior source within the CSS department—who spoke on the "condition of anonymity"—confirmed that there was a "push to potentially make some cuts” to Assured Income for the Severely Handicapped (AISH), that 69,785 depend on. The source said that the cuts would "not be minor"—they would be "significant."

In response to the report, on the afternoon of September 11, 2020, Rajan Sawhney, Minister of Community and Social Services, posted a statement on her Facebook account, saying that "there have been no changes to program eligibility, benefits, or program funding" to the AISH program. The next morning, September 12, 2020, on Facebook, she addressed "those of you who have had a sleepless night, due to the stress of yesterday's news", saying "let me provide you with some reassurance... let me state definitively that there will be no cuts to AISH financial benefits."

The UCP's decision to de-index AISH benefits announced in the 2019 budget was poorly received in October 2019.

== Infrastructure ==
On June 1, 2020, Prime Minister Trudeau announced that the federal government will advance the 2020-21 federal Gas Tax Fund in a single payment of $2.2 billion in June to "3,600 communities across Canada", instead of spreading the payment over the year, to help cities "cover COVID-19-prompted budget shortfalls." Alberta municipalities responded that this is not enough, and they wrote to Premier Kenney "asking the province to work with Ottawa to find emergency funding." On June 19, Premier Kenney and Transportation Minister Ric McIver announced that the province will "spend another $200 million on municipal infrastructure projects", earmarked for "local transportation infrastructure and waterworks projects." It is anticipated that this will create "thousands of jobs".

== Technical and Corporate Services ==
=== Issues Manager ===
The Kenney administration created a new position entitled issues manager, reporting to the Assistant Deputy Minister (ADM) of Technical and Corporate Services. The issues manager identifies and manages both "strategic and operational issues" based on the UCP's "policies, procedures and processes". In August 2019, Premier Kenney hired Matt Wolf as issues manager, a position he had held during the premiership of then Prime Minister of Canada, Stephen Harper. Wolf had previously worked for the UCP as chief of staff. Wolf also worked in the private sector for Sun News Network from 2011 to 2015. Matt was implicated in the so-called 2017 "kamikaze" campaign against Brian Jean but has denied any wrongdoing. In March 2019, just prior to the provincial election, the Edmonton Journal had revealed internal emails that showed collaboration between Wolf and Jeff Callaway's campaign, through Cameron Davies, Callaway's co-campaign manager. The leaked documents included regular communication between Davies and Wolf discussing "ads and memes, research, timelines of ad drops, strategy tips" "talking points", "speaking notes, message planning, graphics and videos". Lorne Gibson, then Alberta's elections commissioner, had investigated Callaway's campaign in which he had allegedly served as a "kamikaze" candidate for Kenney. By November 2019, just after Gibson had handed out 15 fines against 15 people totalling C$207,223, which included a C$15,000 levied against Davies, Gibson's position as commissioner was eliminated by the UCP administration. The RCMP has continued its investigation. In April 2020, Kenney and other UCP members were cleared in an ethics probe. The Ethics commissioner wrote in her report that "it appears Matt Wolf, a senior staff member in the premier's office, may have been involved in some "questionable political shenanigans" but said there is no evidence to suggest the premier knew about them." By October 28, 2020, the 2017 UCP leadership race was still under investigation by Alberta's election commissioner and the RCMP.

== Office of the Ethics Commissioner ==
Ethics Commissioner, Marguerite Trussler, cleared Premier Kenney and UCP staff in a conflict of interest investigation against Premier Kenney, Doug Schweitzer, Jason Nixon and others, over the firing of Lorne Gibson, Alberta's election commissioner in November.

== Response to COVID-19 pandemic ==
In response to the COVID-19 pandemic in Alberta, Premier Kenney declared a state of emergency on March 17, which gives the province or the provincial health authority the right to "acquire or use property, require a qualified person to help out, authorize the conscription of people needed or authorize the entry into buildings or onto land without a warrant" under the Public Health Act. Although the order may lapse after 30 days, it can be renewed. Ontario and British Columbia also declared a state of emergency as the number of cases increased. By March 17, there were 23 new cases representing the "largest day-over-day increase yet in the province" resulting in total of 97 people in Alberta with the virus. Confirmed cases across the province include 20 in the Calgary zone, 20 in the Edmonton zone, 3 in the Central zone, 1 in the South zone, and 3 in the North zone.

Premier Kenney set out the UCP government's COVID-19 strategy to Albertans in his April 7 address from the Cabinet room in the Legislature—"Protecting lives and livelihoods". In a call for unity, he cited former American President Franklin D. Roosevelt, the architect of 1933 New Deal: "The only thing we have to fear is fear itself. We face the arduous days that lie before us in the warm courage of (our) unity." He cited Preston Manning, "In a fierce prairie storm, he said, cattle often get spooked, turn tail, and try to run from it, getting separated and lost. But the buffalo, which Indigenous people have always revered as a symbol of life on the prairies, herd closely together and face the storm head on, coming out of it strong and united."

On July 21, 2020, Education Minister, Adriana LaGrange and Premier Kenney announced that schools "will open in September at near-normal operations with protections in place to limit the spread of the virus, including extra cleaning, hand sanitization and reorganizing classrooms to allow for more space." On July 24, 2020, Premier Kenney retweeted that he found Danielle Smith's Calgary Herald opinion piece entitled "Let's get kids back to class and protect those really at risk", an interesting perspective.

In a November 10, 2020 podcast interview with Cory Morgan, Premier Kenney said that in terms of stringency of response to the pandemic, if Sweden is 1 on 10 and Australia is 10, Alberta is 3, which is the "sweet spot". Premier Kenney went into isolation on November 12 after coming into contact with someone who tested positive. In a November 15 interview and in the Morgan podcast, Kenney described his approach as one informed by responsible freedom. A November 23 article in the Star headlined with "Where is Jason Kenney", as critics said he had not been seen for two weeks, when the number of COVID-19 cases in Alberta exceeded that of any other province. On November 22, the daily number of cases in Alberta was higher than in Ontario, even though Ontario's population is three times greater than Alberta's.

On November 25, 2020, Kenney declared a state of public health emergency, and introduced new "targeted restrictions" which included online classes for high schools. Alberta was the only province to not issue a mandatory province-wide face-covering. Kenney said that he did not "want to create a backlash" by mandating masks in rural Alberta, where there are fewer cases of COVID-19. Kenney said he had been cautioned against it by a rural MLA who said that, while many of his constituents have begun to wear masks, they would take the masks off the "moment the government tells them to wear it."

On December 8, with 1,727 new cases, a new record of 20,388 active cases, with 654 people hospitalized and 112 in intensive care units, and a total of 640 Covid-related deaths, Premier Kenney imposed new and more stringent COVID-19 restrictions. The premier rejected criticism that his failure to act more forcefully had resulted in unnecessary deaths. He dismissed these comments as "Alberta bashing."

On June 18, 2021, Kenney announced his Open for Summer plan, which was conditional on having 70% of eligible Albertans receiving their first vaccination. Alberta became the first province to enact a major shift in its approach to COVID-19, which Shandro described as an "inevitable next step" that other provinces would soon follow. By the end of July, 65% of Albertans had received their second dose of the COVID-19 vaccine and 95% of all new COVID-19 cases were concentrated in the unvaccinated. On July 28, Hinshaw announced that Alberta Health was downgrading the risk from pandemic to endemic, treating COVID-19 like other respiratory viruses. She announced the scaling back of isolation requirements, asymptomatic testing and most contact tracing.

Kenney was on vacation for 23 days from August 9 through September 2 in order to avoid "burn-out". During that period, the fourth wave of the pandemic caused a "worsening health crisis" in the province and overwhelmed front-line health workers, who were themselves "burning out". Nurses were being called back from vacations and Alberta Health Services was "mandat[ing] them to work overtime.

On September 15, 2021, with the number of COVID-related deaths at one per hour, Kenney declared a public health emergency in Alberta, and announced new COVID-related restrictions and measures, including a vaccine passport. During the previous week, there were more than 10,000 active COVID-19 cases in Alberta which was "more than Ontario and Quebec combined." On September 15, which was then the "deadliest day" of the province's fourth wave of the COVID-19 epidemic, Calgary Mayor Naheed Nenshi said that, "I have (worked with) six premiers, two prime ministers, I've worked with dozens of big city mayors — some of whom were embroiled in scandal and lots of trouble — and I have never seen a government this incompetent."

=== Nonessential Trips Abroad Controversy ===
Controversy erupted in Kenney's premiership when over the Christmas holidays in 2020, his chief of staff, municipal affairs minister, and five other MLA's travelled abroad during the holidays contrary to their own government's public health warnings of non-essential travel. By January 2, 2021, the issue "became a big story in Canada", according to the Washington Post. Premier Kenney, at first, decided that those concerned would not be punished unlike Ontario's finance minister Rod Phillips who immediately resigned, when his weeks-long trip to the St. Barts, a luxury destination in the Caribbean, was revealed by the media, along with his dated social media posts implying that he was still in Canada. Kenney claimed personal responsibility saying he had not been clear enough in the guidelines. Jamie Huckabay, Kenney's chief of staff's UK Christmas vacation, as well as that of MLA for Grande Prairie, Tracy Allard, who as Alberta's Municipal Affairs Minister is also responsible for emergency preparedness, and therefore ultimately for the rollout of the vaccine. Allard left for Hawaii on December 19. By Monday, January 4th, Kenney changed his position amid public outcry, and announced the resignations and loss of position, of Tracy Allard, who resigned as municipal affairs minister; Jeremy Nixon, who resigned as a parliamentary secretary; Jason Stephan, who resigned from the Treasury Board; Tanya Fir, Pat Rehn, and Tany Yao who lost their roles on legislative committees.

No provincial government more than Alberta during the pandemic has seen so many caucus members leave the country during December, regardless of pandemic health warnings. The Leger report placed Kenney's approval rate for handling of the pandemic as the lowest in Canada, at 30%.

== Public Sector Compensation Transparency Act ==
On November 27, 2019, the Alberta government published the "political staff salaries and contracts" as required by the Public Sector Compensation Transparency Act, also known as the "Sunshine List".

According to their website, most of the salaries fall below the disclosure threshold, which was $111,395 in 2019. Medicine Hat News reported that 14 of Kenney's political staff salaries were above the threshold—2 were over $224,000, four were about $200,000, and the rest were more than $114,000. The total is over $2.9 million. Kenney had cut his own annual salary in 2019 to about $186,000. The Alberta director for the Canadian Taxpayers Federation, Franco Terrazzano, called these salaries "eye-popping."

== Responses to Kenney's premiership ==
A March 3 CBC article listed the reasons for Kenney's drop in the polls to 47% in March 2020 approving his overall performance from 60% in September 2019. In the March polls, 46% of Albertan's approved of Notley's performance. This included the blockades as well as the UCP's "aggressive approach to bolster the province's oil and gas sector and balance the budget through cuts". Other controversial actions taken by the UCP include, "cutting funding for post-secondary institutions while lifting the tuition cap"; "reducing funding to municipalities; "imposing unilateral changes to the way doctors bill the province; making clear it wants freezes or cuts to government employees' pay when collective agreements come up for negotiation this spring; spending $30 million per year on a war room now called the Canadian Energy Centre; making its first bill of the new sitting one that targets those who disrupt critical infrastructure with severe penalties; and "fully or partially closing 20 provincial parks and seeking "partnerships" for 164 more."

== Polling results ==
According to Research Co.'s March 11 to March 13, 2022 online survey of 600 adults in Alberta, 45% of decided voters would vote NDP and 30% would vote UCP. In terms of approval of Premier Kenney's performance, 26% approved and 66% disapproved.

ThinkHQ Public Affairs September 29 to October 1, 2021 poll found that 22% of Albertans approved of Kenney's performance and 77% disapproved.

=== Approval of Kenney's and UCP performance ===
In September 2019, with a 60% approval rating, Kenney was one of the top-three most-popular premiers in Canada with only Premier Moe of Saskatchewan and Quebec's François Legault winning higher approval ratings by a small margin. and 60% in September 2019. According to an Angus Reid Institute poll undertaken in June 2021, only about 31% of respondents approved of Kenney's track record. Earlier Angus Reid polling reports said that, "Albertans have grown increasingly critical" of Premier Kenney and the UCP "government's response to the coronavirus, and the province's finances are in historically poor shape with oil revenues plummeting and pandemic-related economic shocks persisting." The June 2021 report said that "both sides" of Alberta's "political spectrum" have been angered by Kenney's response to the pandemic; they are critical of his approach to pandemic-related restrictions.

According to a ThinkHQ Public Affairs Inc. poll released on December 16, 2019, Albertans who disapprove of the performance of the UCP government were in the majority at 53%, which reflects a "considerable slide in public approval" since October. Of the respondents who voted for the UCP in spring, 21% disapproved of Kenney by December 16. In ThinkHQ's poll the opposition to the UCP was "considerably more intense than support"—38% said they strongly disapproved with only 16% strong approving. Reasons for the slide in popularity by December 2019, included growing concerns about both employment and the economy with "many voters" concerned with the "unexpected consequences related to budget-tightening by the new Kenney government."

=== Voter intent ===
According to a June 2021 Angus Reid Institute poll, only 30% of respondents reported that they would vote for the UCP in the 2023 election, 41% would vote for the NDP, and 20% for the Wildrose Independence Party. A January 6–7, 2021 Mainstreet Research survey on voting intentions showed the UCP in a "sharp decline"—41% said they would vote for the NDP, 26% for the UCP, and 9% for the Wildrose Party with 16% undecided.

A May 2020 poll had found that 56% of those polled did not want Kenney as Premier. Kenney's s disapproval rating with the highest of all the regions polled. However, at that time, in spite of a "drop in his approval numbers", 46% of Albertans, polled in May 2020 by CBC News-Road Ahead, had said they would "vote for Jason Kenney's UCP.". According to Mount Royal University political science professor, Duane Bratt, Kenney's poll numbers reflect the UCP's "clash with doctors over pay" during the pandemic. A CBC News-Road Ahead survey led by Pollster Janet Brown completed by June 1, 2020, found that most Albertans approved the federal, provincial and municipal governments' responses to the pandemic. Seventy per cent of Albertans approved the provincial government's response and 62% approved of the federal government's response.

=== Approval of handling of the pandemic ===
In May 2021, Alberta had the "worst COVID-19 outbreak in North America", for which UCP critics laid the blame on the Alberta government's "relatively relaxed approach to restrictions". By late December, 2020, Kenney's approval rate among Albertans for handling of the pandemic was already the lowest in Canada, at 30%. By late November 2020, pollsters said that Kenney's UCP government was criticized by those who want more restrictions to bend the curve in response to the record high number of cases of the coronavirus. Criticisms of Kenney's response to COVID-19 included the controversial June 1 dinner party Kenney hosted at the Sky Palace with Nixon, Toews, Shandro and a staff member in which photographic evidence showed they were breaking "his own government's COVID-19 public health rules". Kenney apologized and "admitted that he has tried to observe the rules throughout this difficult period but has not 'always done that perfectly'."

=== Leaked polling ===
According to a March 22, 2022 Marketing Research and Intelligence Association (MRIA) letter posted on the MRIA's Twitter account, a syndicated study by Janet Brown, a veteran Alberta pollster, was leaked to the media by the UCP governing political party without Brown's permission and published without context and lacking crucial data. The MRIA said that the UCP's "abuse of power" should be "vigorously condemned."

== Leadership review and resignation ==
On September 17, 2021, Joel Mullan, UCP Vice President of policy, said the future of the UCP party was at stake as he called on the board to meet to consider initiating an early leadership review of Premier Kenny. According to a September 21 Western Standard article, Mullan called on Kenney to resign as immediately as leader of the party he had founded 4 years ago in response to concerns raised by the UCP membership "over the last several months". Mullen said that Kenney had "painted himself into a corner on several occasions" and had failed to offer a "measured approach with communications." The Toronto Star reported that Alberta's health-care system had "buckle[d] under the pressure" of a poorly handled COVID-19 crisis and Kenney had been criticized by "all parts of the political spectrum". Kenney is facing a party leadership review on April 9, 2022, in Red Deer at a UCP SGM. The results of the review are expected on May 18, 2022. Kenney was under intense criticism by his caucus which was threatening a revolt for his response to the pandemic and for his style of leadership, which was described as "uncompromising", "tenacious" and "combative" in a Reuters' article. Kenney had called for a leadership review in an attempt to prevent a caucus coup.

On May 18, 2022, after receiving 51.4% of the UCP party members' votes, Kenney stepped down as UCP leader.

== See also ==
- Premiership of Danielle Smith
- 30th Alberta Legislature
- Alberta Energy Regulator
- Alberta Geological Survey
- Alberta Health Services
- Alberta Human Rights Commission
- Alberta Municipal Government Board
- Alberta Oil Sands Technology and Research Authority
- Alberta Parks
- Economy of Alberta
