= Social programs in Canada =

Social programs in Canada (French: programmes sociaux) include all Canadian government programs designed to give assistance to citizens outside of what the market provides. The Canadian social safety net includes a broad spectrum of programs, many of which are run by the provinces and territories. Canada also has a wide range of government transfer payments to individuals, which totaled $176.6 billion in 2009—this cost only includes social programs that administer funds to individuals; programs such as medicare and public education are additional costs.

== Background ==
=== Usage ===
In Canada, the entirety of the social provisions of government are called social programs (French: programmes sociaux), as opposed to social welfare in European/British parlance.

Like in the United States, welfare in Canada colloquially refers to direct payments to low-income individuals only, and not to healthcare and education spending. It is rarely used in Canada as the name of any specific program, however, because of its negative connotations. (In French, it is commonly known as le bien-être social or l'aide sociale.) In Canadian slang, welfare is also sometimes referred to as "the dole" (also common amongst Britain and other Commonwealth countries) or "pogey". Before the Second World War, such programs were generally known as "relief".

=== History ===
Generally speaking, before the Great Depression most social services were provided by religious charities and other private groups. Changing government policy between the 1930s and 1960s saw the emergence of a welfare state, similar to many Western European countries. Most programs from that era are still in use, although many were scaled back during the 1990s as government priorities shifted towards reducing budget deficits that were reaching levels deemed too high.

== Healthcare ==
All provinces in Canada provide universal, publicly funded healthcare to Canadian citizens, permanent residents and certain temporary residents, with their costs partially subsidized by the federal government. Approximately 70% of expenditures for healthcare in Canada come from public sources, with the rest paid privately (both through private insurance, and through out-of-pocket payments). The extent of public financing varies considerably across services. For example, approximately 99% of physician services, and 90% of hospital care, are paid by publicly funded sources, whereas almost all dental care and most prescription drug cost are paid for privately. Most physicians are self-employed private entities which enjoy coverage under each province's respective healthcare plans. Compared to other single-payer health systems in the world, Canada is unusual in banning the purchase of private insurance or care for any services that are listed. This is meant to prevent what is described as 'two-tier healthcare', which would allow the rich to "jump the queue". However, in 2005 the Supreme Court of Canada ruled in Chaoulli v. Quebec (Attorney General) that the ban on private care could be unconstitutional if it caused unreasonable delays for patients.

In 2023, the government established the Canadian Dental Care Plan, which began a staggered enrolment rollout in December 2023, to pay costs for covered dental services of eligible residents.

== Education ==
In Canada, provinces and territories are responsible for their elementary and secondary schools. Education is compulsory up to the age of 16 in most provinces, 17 and 18 in others. Both elementary and secondary education is provided at a nominal cost. Private education is available, but its comparatively high costs and the relative quality of public education result in it being less popular than in the United States or Britain. Post-secondary schooling is not free, but is subsidized by the federal and provincial governments. Financial assistance is available through student loans and bursaries.

== Housing ==
Canadian mortgages are insured by the federal Canadian Mortgage and Housing Corporation and most provinces have ministries in charge of regulating the housing market. It was created in the 1940s and in Quebec in 1958.

== Unemployment benefits ==
Formerly called "Unemployment Insurance", this system's name was changed to "Employment Insurance" (EI, French: Prestations d’assurance-emploi) in 1996. In 2024, Canadian workers paid premiums of 1.66% of insured earnings in return for benefits if they lose their jobs.

The Employment and Social Insurance Act was passed during the Great Depression by the government of R. B. Bennett as an attempted Canadian unemployment insurance program (in 1935). It was ruled unconstitutional by the Supreme Court of Canada, however, as unemployment was judged to be an insurance matter falling under provincial responsibility. After a constitutional amendment was agreed to by all of the provinces, a reference to "Unemployment Insurance" was added to the matters falling under federal authority under the Constitution Act, 1867, and the first Canadian system was adopted in 1940. Because of these problems Canada was the last major Western country to bring in an employment insurance system.

== Low-income support ==
All provinces maintain a low-income-support program known by names such as "social assistance", "income support", "income assistance" and "welfare assistance"; popularly they are known as welfare (French: le bien-être social or l'aide sociale). Like in the United States, welfare in Canada colloquially refers to direct payments to low-income individuals only, and not to healthcare and education spending. Moreover, in Canadian slang, welfare is also sometimes referred to as 'the dole' or 'pogey or even referred to as paupers.

The purpose of these programs is to alleviate extreme poverty by providing a monthly payment to people with little or no income. The rules for eligibility and the amount given vary widely between the provinces. This program was created in the 1940s, and in Quebec in 1958. The original plan was for Ottawa to pay half of the financial support for families and the other half paid by each of the provinces.

== Seniors ==
Most Canadian seniors are eligible for Old Age Security, a taxable monthly social security payment. In addition, most former workers can receive Canada Pension Plan or Quebec Pension Plan benefits based on their contributions during their careers. As well many people have a private pension through their employer, although that is becoming less common, and many people take advantage of a government tax-shelter for investments called a Registered Retirement Savings Plan or may save money privately.

== Children and families ==
Usually each province has a department or ministry in charge of child welfare and dealing with adoption, foster care, etc. As of 2007 the federal government also offers the Universal Child Care Benefit to subsidize the cost of daycare spots or other forms of childcare.

== Disability ==
Each province is responsible for disability welfare:

- Alberta – Assured Income for the Severely Handicapped.
- British Columbia – Income Assistance for Persons with Disabilities (Disability Assistance), which is run and maintained by the Ministry of Social Development and Poverty Reduction.
- Nova Scotia – Disability Support Program and the Income Assistance Disability Supplement
- Ontario – Ontario Disability Support Program, which is run and maintained by the Ministry of Children, Community and Social Services. The program offers income and employment assistance for disabled people and the Assistive Devices Program to provide funding to help pay the cost of assistive devices for people with long-term physical disabilities.
- Quebec – Programme de solidarité sociale (Contraintes sévères à l'emploi), which is run and maintained by the Ministry of Employment and Social Solidarity.
- Saskatchewan – Assured Income for Disability.

== Regional aid ==
The government has several agencies dedicated to developing specific regions.

- Atlantic Canada Opportunities Agency
- Canadian Northern Economic Development Agency
- Economic Development Agency of Canada for the Regions of Quebec
- Federal Economic Development Initiative for Northern Ontario
- Federal Economic Development Agency for Southern Ontario
- Western Economic Diversification Canada

== See also ==
- Basic income in Canada
- Poverty in Canada
- Matthew effect (Sociology)
- Welfare
- Welfare state
- Social safety net
- Social security
- Social policy

=== Comparisons ===
- American social programs
  - U.S. Social Security
- Australian social security
- Indian social programs
- Italian welfare
- New Zealand welfare
- Scandinavian welfare model
  - Swedish welfare
  - Swedish social security
  - Finnish welfare
- UK welfare
