= 2019 Alberta provincial budget =

2019 Budget of the Government of Alberta
Bill 20 Bill 21
- Presented: October 24, 2019
- Country: Canada
- Parliament: 30th
- Party: United Conservative
- Finance minister: Travis Toews
- Total revenue: $50 billion
- Total expenditures: $58,720 million
- Program Spending: $54,612 million
- Deficit: ▼$8.7 billion
- Debt: Total outstanding debt $80.8 billion Taxpayer supported debt $62.7 billion
- Website: Alberta 2019 budget

The 2019 Alberta budget, known as the A plan for jobs and the economy, is the budget for the province of Alberta for fiscal year 2019 - 2020. It was presented to the Legislative Assembly of Alberta on October 24, 2019 by Travis Toews, the Minister of Finance of Alberta of the Government of Alberta.

== Overview ==
On October 24, 2019, Minister of Finance of Alberta and President of the Treasury Board, Travis Toews, presented the United Conservative Party (UCP)'s first provincial budget, the 2019 Alberta budget known as the "A plan for jobs and the economy".

The National Post said that it fulfilled their "promise of slight austerity" with "cuts to spending programs and the elimination of hundreds of bureaucracy jobs". The Post said that these and the corporate tax cuts "were the key planks of a four-year plan to bring the budget into balance." The goal is to reduce government spending by $4-billion over four years, and to balance the budget by 2022-2023. The 2019-20 budget will "run a deficit of $8.7 billion" which is approximately "$2-billion higher than in 2018-19."

== Revenues ==
Revenues for fiscal year 2019-2020 are expected to be $50 billion. At the end of FY2018-2019 total revenue was $49.6 billion, which was "$2.3 billion higher than in 2017-18, and an increase of $1.7 billion from budget."

Total revenue (millions of dollars)
| | 2018 | 2019 |
|---|---|---|
| Personal income tax | 11,874 | 11,990 |
| Corporate income tax | 4,871 | 4,177 |
| Other tax revenue | 6,833 | 5,766 |
| Resource revenue – Bitumen royalties | 3,214 | 4,682 |
| Resource revenue – other | 2,215 | 1,845 |
| Federal transfers | 8,013 | 9,200 |
| Investment income | 2,349 | 2,585 |
| Net income from business enterprises | 2,585 | 2,417 |
| Premiums, fees and licences | 3,911 | 3,872 |
| Other revenue | 3,759 | 3,482 |
| Total revenue | 49,624 | 50,016 |

== Expenditures ==
Total program spending was $54,548 million in 2018 and $54,612 million in 2019. The total expenditures which includes total program spending, debt servicing costs and pension provisions, were $56,335 million in 2018 with a forecast of $58,720 million in spending in 2019.

Program spending decreased for Advanced Education, Agriculture and Forestry, Culture, Multiculturalism and Status of Women, Economic Development, Trade and Tourism, Education, Environment and Parks, Indigenous Relations, Seniors and Housing, Service Alberta, and the Treasury Board and Finance.

Total expenditures (millions of dollars)
| | 2018 | 2019 |
|---|---|---|
| Advanced Education | 6,094 | 5,842 ▼ |
| Agriculture and Forestry | 1,434 | 1,411 ▼ |
| Children's Services | 1,492 | 1,586 ▲ |
| Community and Social Services | 3,636 | 3,910 ▲ |
| Culture, Multiculturalism and Status of Women | 327 | 277 ▼ |
| Economic Development, Trade and Tourism | 356 | 295 ▼ |
| Education | 8,637 | 8,580 ▼ |
| Environment and Parks | 748 | 724 ▼ |
| Executive Council | 17 | 20 ▼ |
| Health | 21,915 | 22,105 ▲ |
| Indigenous Relations | 261 | 198 ▼ |
| Infrastructure | 639 | 613 ▼ |
| Justice and Solicitor General | 1,454 | 1,454 |
| Labour and Immigration | 209 | 220 ▲ |
| Municipal Affairs | 1,229 | 1,521 ▲ |
| Seniors and Housing | 726 | 704 ▼ |
| Service Alberta | 688 | 675 ▼ |
| Transportation | 1,584 | 1,703 ▲ |
| Treasury Board and Finance | 2,221 | 1,861 ▼ |
| Legislative Assembly | 137 | 159 ▲ |
| Total Program Expense | 54,548 | 54,612 |

=== Healthcare and social assistance ===
According to the budget, "Current, generous levels for Assured Income for the Severely Handicapped (AISH), the Alberta Seniors Benefit, Income Support and Special Needs Assistance programs will be maintained. Indexation will be paused but benefits will not be rolled back or cut." The budget says that, "AISH recipients currently receive $1,685 a month in basic benefits which is $430 per month more than the next highest province." However, the budget reversed the "Assured Income for the Severely Handicapped (AISH)’s tie to inflation." The decision to de-index disability benefits met with outrage, according to The Star with many people "vocal about their disdain" for the decision, including Arlene Dickinson, formerly with the Dragons' Den.

=== Advanced education ===
The budget forecast a growth in revenue of $181 million over the next 3 years, as the province ends the freeze in tuition fees in 2020-21 and allows the fees to increase to "up to 7 per cent per year for the next three years." This is in response to recommendations of the Janice MacKinnon's August 2019 "Report and Recommendations: Blue Ribbon Panel on Alberta's Finances". In August 2019, Janice MacKinnon's task force submitted the report commissioned by Premier Kenney, "Report and Recommendations: Blue Ribbon Panel on Alberta's Finances". mandated by Premier Kenney to "figure out how to balance the provincial books without raising taxes." McKinnon, who was Saskatchewan's finance minister, found that "Alberta spends more per person on its public sector, and compensates its teachers, doctors and other workers more generously, than other major provinces." The panel recommended that the post-secondary tuition freeze be lifted, and suggested "various measures to slash health-care costs and government-wide program reviews." The Post said that the changes in post-secondary education were "significant" with a 12-per-cent funding cut and a reduction in "government grants to post-secondary institutions". Together that represents a $1.9 billion in cuts in post-secondary education. Post-secondary institutions will be allowed to increase tuition.

== Budget omnibus bills ==
On October 28, the Minister Toews introduced Bill 20, an omnibus bill which included a clause through which the government of Alberta could withdraw the $1.53-billion grant it had promised for Calgary's Green Line "with just 90 days' notice and without cause."

Minister Toews introduced a second omnibus bill, Bill 21, on October 28, as part of his budget that allows the provincial government to "cancel its master agreement with doctors if the two sides can't negotiate a new deal." In an October 30 open letter to all members of the Alberta Medical Association, Dr. Christine Molnar, AMA director, said that the "bill effectively gives government the power of pre-approval to cancel any physician services agreement without recourse. This is a violation of the sanctity of contracts." The bill would also give the government control over where new doctors can work starting in March 2022, in order to provide better service to rural areas.

== Total debt ==
As of December 31, 2019, Alberta's total outstanding debt was $85.9 billion. This includes $62.7 billion in taxpayer supported debt and "$18.1 billion in loans to self‑supporting provincial corporations", which together total $80.8 billion, as well as all the other debts issued by the "Province of Alberta, money borrowed directly by the Alberta Capital Finance Authority, and P3 contracts." Of the 85.9 billion, "$5.1 billion is lent to government‑business enterprises (or GBEs)." The $5.1 billion debt for these government‑business enterprises is not consolidated with provincial financial statements or debt but is listed on the GBEs' financial statements. The $80.8 billion is "shown in government's consolidated statement of financial position." The cost to service the debt in 2018-2019 was about $2 billion.

== Protests ==
On December 1, 2019, over 1,000 demonstrators protested outside a Calgary hotel where the UCP was holding a party convention. The protesters—who represented many "sectors", including "core public services like education and health care", that "felt the burden of the provincial budget"—marched while "singing anti-Kenney chants and carrying signs".

== See also ==
- Economy of Alberta
- Premiership of Jason Kenney
