= Ontario Disability Support Program =

Last resort income support program

Ontario Coat of Arms

The Ontario Disability Support Program (ODSP) is a means-tested government-funded last resort income support paid for qualifying residents in the province of Ontario, Canada, who are at least eighteen years of age and have a disability. ODSP and Ontario Works (OW) are the two main components of Ontario's social assistance system. Like most social programs in Canada, the program is funded by the government of the province. The Ministry of Community and Social Services is responsible for ODSP and OW.

This is unlike Social Security Disability in the United States which is a federally funded program under the umbrella of an Old Age Pension but provides similar benefits — regardless of the state of residence.

The ODSP is defined by provincial legislation, the ODSP Act, and its supporting regulations. It is managed through policy directives.

Unlike Ontario Works, ODSP does not require recipients to undertake employment-related activities like job searching, or vocational training. This is determined through a subjective evaluation of four criteria that are defined within the ODSP Act:

- The disability is continuous or recurrent;
- It is expected to last for a year or more;
- The disability significantly limits their ability to work, look after themselves, or get out in the community; and
- It has been verified by an approved health professional.

For recipients wishing to work, an optional component provides employment support funding, such as referral to a specialized employment counsellor.

ODSP is meant to replace the income lost due to the recipient's disability making them unable to work enough to gain self-sufficiency and thus has a higher rate of assistance and asset limits than Ontario Works does.

== Benefits ==
The program is paid monthly to a "benefit unit" which can consist of a single person between 18 and 65 (or a senior citizen who is ineligible for Old Age Security or Canada Pension Plan) and any others who may require the person's support. This can be any corresponding dependent adults who do not qualify for assistance (though they are subject to workfare requirements), children under the individual's care, or a spouse. The ODSP benefit has two main components: a fixed basic needs allowance, and an amount for housing that is variable. For those who do not have independent cooking facilities and/or cannot provide grocery receipts, a "Board and Lodging" amount is provided instead. All costs are verified through submitted receipts and information sharing among other government agencies.

In addition to employment supports and financial assistance, the ODSP provides health-related benefits to assist recipients with their medical needs. These include:

- Prescription medication coverage (for medications listed on the Ontario Drug Benefit formulary) - a co-payment may apply
- Dental coverage
- Vision care (including assistance with the purchase of eyeglasses)
- Medical transportation assistance (verified as medically necessary by a doctor)
- Nutritional assistance for pregnant and breastfeeding women.
- Coverage for medical supplies related to a recipient's disability
- Transitional coverage for those who no longer meet financial eligibility or move on to full-time work.
- Financial assistance to help recipients and their families with essential living expenses
- Help to find and to keep a job, and advancing a career

== See also ==
- Assured Income for the Severely Handicapped
- National Disability Insurance Scheme (Australia)
