= Marguerite Trussler =

Served as the Canadian Province of Alberta's Ethics Commissioner

Marguerite Trussler KC

Office of the Ethics Commissioner and Lobbyist Registrar of Alberta
- active
- Assuming office
- Succeeding: Neil Wilkinson

Personal details
- Education: University of Alberta
- Occupation: Judge

Marguerite J Trussler KC is the Ethics Commissioner of the Canadian Province of Alberta, an Officer of the Provincial Legislature.

== Education ==
Trussler received her B.A. in 1969, her LL.B. in 1970 from the University of Alberta in Edmonton. She received her LL.M. in 1974 from the University of Melbourne, and her LL.D. in 2012 from the University of Alberta.

== Career ==
Trussler served a Court of Queen's Bench of Alberta judge from 1986 to 2007. Arguably, the highest profile case she heard in her years on this Bench was the Charles Ng extradition hearing, when American journalists filled her court to follow the proceedings.

She also served as chair of the Alberta Gaming and Liquor Commission from 2007 to 2014.

=== Office of the Ethics Commissioner ===
Trussler was endorsed by the Members of the Legislative Assembly (MLAs) in May 2014, during the early months of the tenure of then Alberta Premier Dave Hancock, who served as interim leader of the Progressive Conservative Association. The Ethics Commissioner is an "independent officer of the legislature responsible for investigating complaints made against MLAs under the Conflict of Interest Act, providing advice to members on ethics issues and reviewing MLA disclosure statements." Then Lieutenant Governor in Council, Donald Stewart Ethell OC OMM AOE MSC CD appointed Trussler following the recommendation of the MLAs. Trussler succeeded Neil Wilkinson, a former Progressive Conservative party member. Before serving as Commissioner, Wilkinson served as the chair of Edmonton’s now-defunct Capital Health Region. His investigations into Peter Sandhu, a former MLA, and former premier Alison Redford, were heavily criticized by all three opposition parties.

== Family ==
Trussler is married to Sir Francis Price, 7th Baronet, KC.
