= Assured Income for the Severely Handicapped =

Social welfare program in Alberta, Canada

The Assured Income for the Severely Handicapped (AISH) is a provincial program established in 1979 in Alberta, Canada, that provides financial and health related benefits to eligible adult Albertans under the age of 65, who are legally identified as having severe and permanent disabilities that seriously impede the individual's ability to earn a living. The total AISH caseload was 69,785 in 2020, which represents 1.6% of Alberta's population. For those eligible for AISH, benefits include a monthly payment, as well as access to a number of services and/or subsidies, including prescriptions, dental and optical services. In 2020, the primary medical conditions of 44.1% of AISH recipients were related to physical disabilities, 30.4% were related to mental illness disorders, and 25.4% to cognitive disorders, and over 40% of AISH recipients were over fifty years of age. By 2020, the maximum AISH rate for a single person was C$1,685 per month. AISH was indexed to the Consumer Price Index in 2018, de-indexed in 2020, and is being indexed again beginning January 2023. Since 1998, there has been a C$100,000 limit on the amount of liquid assets an AISH recipient can possess. There is also a dollar for dollar claw back on any form of additional income above a set amount that an individual or a family unit receiving AISH, might earn or receive. Such offsets include federal aid, such as Canadian Emergency Response Benefit (CERB), Canada Pension Plan (CPP) disability benefits, a spouse's income, disability benefits through a private insurance plan, and/or Worker Compensation Board (WCB) benefits.

== Overview ==
The AISH program, established in 1979, provides financial and health related assistance to eligible adult Albertans with a disability. AISH was the first program in the country designed for the permanently disabled. It was unique as there were no asset limits.

In 2010, total AISH caseload was 41,664; by July 2020, it was 69,785—which represents 1.6% of Alberta's population receiving AISH benefits as primary recipients. By 2020, 86.1% of AISH recipients were single, and only 2.7% were couples with children. The highest proportion of cases—44.1%—the primary medical condition were related to physical disabilities, 30.4% were related to mental illness disorders, and 25.4% to cognitive disorders. About 15.6% of AISH beneficiaries were aged between 60 and 64, 15.4% were aged between 55 and 59 years, and 11.2% were aged between 50 and 54. Albertans over 65 years of age are no longer eligible for AISH benefits, as they become eligible for Alberta Seniors Benefits in its place. By 2020, the maximum AISH rate for a single person is C$1,685 per month.

In the 2004 provincial election, AISH was the subject of some controversy following supposedly derogatory remarks made by Premier Ralph Klein, stating, of a group of AISH recipients, "they didn't look handicapped to me."

According to the September 2020, Alberta Community and Social Services Open Data report, eligibility to the provincial AISH program's financial and health benefits includes a number of criteria including evidence that the adult Albertan has a severe and permanent disability or disabilities that substantially prevent them from earning a livelihood. Criteria for determining AISH benefits also includes evaluating the existing income and assets available to the applicant through the client and their cohabiting partner.

Once approved, an AISH beneficiary may have access to financial and health related benefits needed to assist them to live as independently as possible. Along with a monthly living allowance, this may include a child benefit allowance, specified health benefits, and some personal benefits. Some of these benefits may be either added regular monthly benefits or one-time payments.

Since at least 2011—along with a base monthly payment—AISH beneficiaries may also be eligible for certain health benefits and or subsidies. This includes most prescription medications, some dental, optical, ambulance, some Alberta Aids to Daily Living (AADL) and transits services, as well as some essential diabetic supplies. AISH benefits include a dental checkup and cleaning every six months, and all necessary fillings; one routine eye exam and a new pair of eyeglasses every two years; about C$41 for people with diabetes who require a special diet; and fees for some ground ambulance service. Some municipal areas offer transit options for eligible AISH recipients that may include a subsidized monthly pass. (Note: The majority of prescriptions—such as antibiotics, Ritalin and Zyprexa—are covered by AISH. A government committee makes the decision on which drugs are covered by AISH.)

== Eligibility and offsets ==
According to the May 1, 2007 AISH Act legislation updated as of November 1, 2010, in order to qualify for the province of Alberta's Assured Income for the Severely Handicapped (AISH), an Alberta adult resident must have a severe—and likely permanent disability with no available remedial therapy—that seriously "impairs their ability to earn a living."

Decision on eligibility is made by the AISH director, based on relevant medical or psychological reports from a qualified health professional(s). AISH benefits are conditional on an applicants financial needs as well as health status. The AISH director makes the final decision on whether an applicant will receive any or all potential AISH benefits.

An AISH recipient becomes ineligible if they have personal total net assets of more than C$100,000 in monetary assets, such as a savings account, or bonds, for example. This does not include ownership of a primary residence or mode of transport. AISH recipients submit a financial update of transactions annually to their assigned AISH worker. This includes providing bank statements for the account in which the AISH payments were deposited. The $100,000 assets limit was introduced to AISH in 1998, as politicians became concerned over "millionaires" on the program.

=== Offsets ===
Recipients' benefits are reduced dollar for dollar by income from other sources including CERB, CPP disability benefits, their spouse's income, disability benefits through a private insurance plan, and/or Worker Compensation Board (WCB) benefits. In 2012, an AISH recipient could receive net employment income up to C$1072 per month without his/her AISH income being clawed back. In February 2012, families can earn up to a net income of C$2,612 per month.

In April 2012, the provincial government clarified limits on the amounts of Employment Income an AISH recipient could receive before a clawback. For a client making a net employment income between C$1,072 and C$2,009 a month, there was a 50% exemption of AISH income, after C$2,009 a month the amount earned is deducted dollar for dollar from the AISH amount for the maximum total income (employment + AISH) of C$3226.00 a month. For families, in 2011, the same 50% exemption applied to those making between C$2,612 to C$3,349 net income, and dollar for dollar deductions after C$3,349 for a maximum total income of C$4,666.00 a month.

In April 2020, the provincial governments AISH payment formulas were recalculated based on the Government of Canada's Canadian Emergency Response Benefit (CERB), a monthly payment of $2000 provided to all eligible Canadians in response to the COVID-19 recession during the COVID-19 pandemic. In April, the UCP Alberta government announced that a "family receiving AISH benefits would see the first $875 fully exempt from the CERB, but any money over and above that is deducted at a rate of 75 per cent." For a single person, they would see the first C$420 fully exempt and any money above that would be deducted. A May 2020 CTV News article explained how for one such family unit in Lethbridge, Alberta with one child, where one individual with cerebral palsy receives an AISH benefit and another family member, a chef laid off from his job because of the pandemic, received C$2000 CERB benefit, had about $900 clawed back by the Alberta government. The family said that, "What they're doing is deducting from her cheques. They're taking almost $900 away from what I receive because I'm receiving CERB and at the end of all this, we have another month before things get well enough that I'll be working again, so that'll be around $3,200 we'll be owing AISH."

Some Canadians choose to begin to receive the national Canada Pension Plan (CPP) before their 65th birthday. Any income that an AISH recipient receives from the national Canada Pension Plan (CPP) is deducted dollar for dollar from the AISH benefit. For example, a recipient who received the maximum CPP disability payment of C$1,001.37 would have received C$683.63 from AISH in 2019. In 2020, they would receive C$1,377.66 from CPP and C$297.34 from AISH.

All AISH benefits end when a person reaches the minimum age of 65. In Canada, at 65, individuals become potentially eligible for federal financial supports, such as Old Age Security (OAS), the Guaranteed Income Supplement (GIS), and CPP. (Note: The old age security amount for a single person, who has met the resident requirements for full old age security, is currently $585.49 per month. If a person has no other income, then the Guaranteed Income Supplement will be an additional $874.48 per month. These two amounts total to $1,459.97 per month. A single woman, Kathy, has a small work pension which pays her $2,400 yearly. Kathy can expect a combined OAS (Old Age Security) GIS (Guaranteed Income Supplement) of $1,351.97 per month. A single man, David, retires but earns $12,000 a year part time. He could expect a combined OAS + GIS of $824.53 per month. Conditions such as time in Canada and Marital status can effect these calculations. If requirements are met, and no other income is available, then a person can expect $1,459.97 per month as a minimum.)

== Changes to benefits ==
Then Premier Allison Redford, who won the 2012 Alberta general election, increased AISH monthly benefits by C$400 to C$1,588 in 2012.

In 2018, the New Democratic Party (NDP) government, under then Premier Rachel Notley, connected some social benefit rates for financial assistance programs—which included AISH and seniors benefits—to the Consumer Price Index through Bill 26: An Act to Combat Poverty and Fight for Albertans with Disabilities. Starting in January 2019, with the cost of living adjustment added to AISH benefits to rise with inflation, monthly AISH payments increased to C$1,685.

The October 24, 2019 provincial budget, tabled by Finance Minister Travis Toews during the Premiership of Jason Kenney, included "cuts to spending programs and the elimination of hundreds of bureaucracy jobs" as well a corporate tax cuts in order to fulfill the United Conservative Party's (UCP) key campaign promises outlined in their 4-year plan to balance the budget. Spending cuts included de-indexing AISH benefits from the Consumer Price Index for four years. The AISH rate will be fixed at a maximum C$1,685 per month instead of rising by 1.57% per year ($108.00 over a four-year term). As well, AISH payment dates were changed to February 28, April 1, May 1, June 1, June 30, July 31, September 1, October 30, December 1, and December 31. Since the beginning of 2020, payment dates were changes so that payments will fall on the first of the month, unless that day falls on a weekend. In that event the payment date will be the Friday before the weekend.

In 2022, Premier Danielle Smith announced the indexing of AISH beginning in January 2023, as part of the Inflation Relief Act.

== Ministry responsible for AISH ==
The Ministry responsible for Seniors was also responsible for the AISH program.

In 2012, responsibility for the AISH program, was moved to the newly formed Human Services ministry.

By 2020, the Ministry of Community and Social Services (CSS) was responsible for the AISH program. On April 30, 2019, Rajan Sawhney was appointed as CSS Minister during the premiership of Jason Kenney. In 2022, following the election of Premier Danielle Smith, CSS was re-named Seniors, Community and Social Services.

=== Comparisons with similar provincial programs ===
Along with AISH in Alberta, British Columbia, Saskatchewan, and Ontario have basically similar income support for persons with disabilities programs. In B.C. it is called the British Columbia Employment & Assistance for Persons with Disabilities (BCEA); the Ontario equivalent is called the Ontario Disability Support Program (ODSP); the Saskatchewan equivalent is called Saskatchewan Assured Income for Disability (SAID). These provincial program benefits vary by family status. For example, BCEA provides a single recipient with no children C$1,183.42 a month and a single parent with two children $1,609.08 a month in 2020. Saskatchewan program gives $981-$1114 a month plus the cost of electricity (amount depends on which city the person lives in). While AISH has a personal total net asset value limit of C$100,000 (not including the assets of the primary residence as well as mode of transportation, like a car), SAID has a liquid asset limit of C$1,500 for a single person and C$3,000 for a couple with no children. Every dollar above that amount will be clawed back from the client dollar for dollar.

== See also ==
- Ontario Disability Support Program (ODSP)
