= Critical Infrastructure Defence Act =

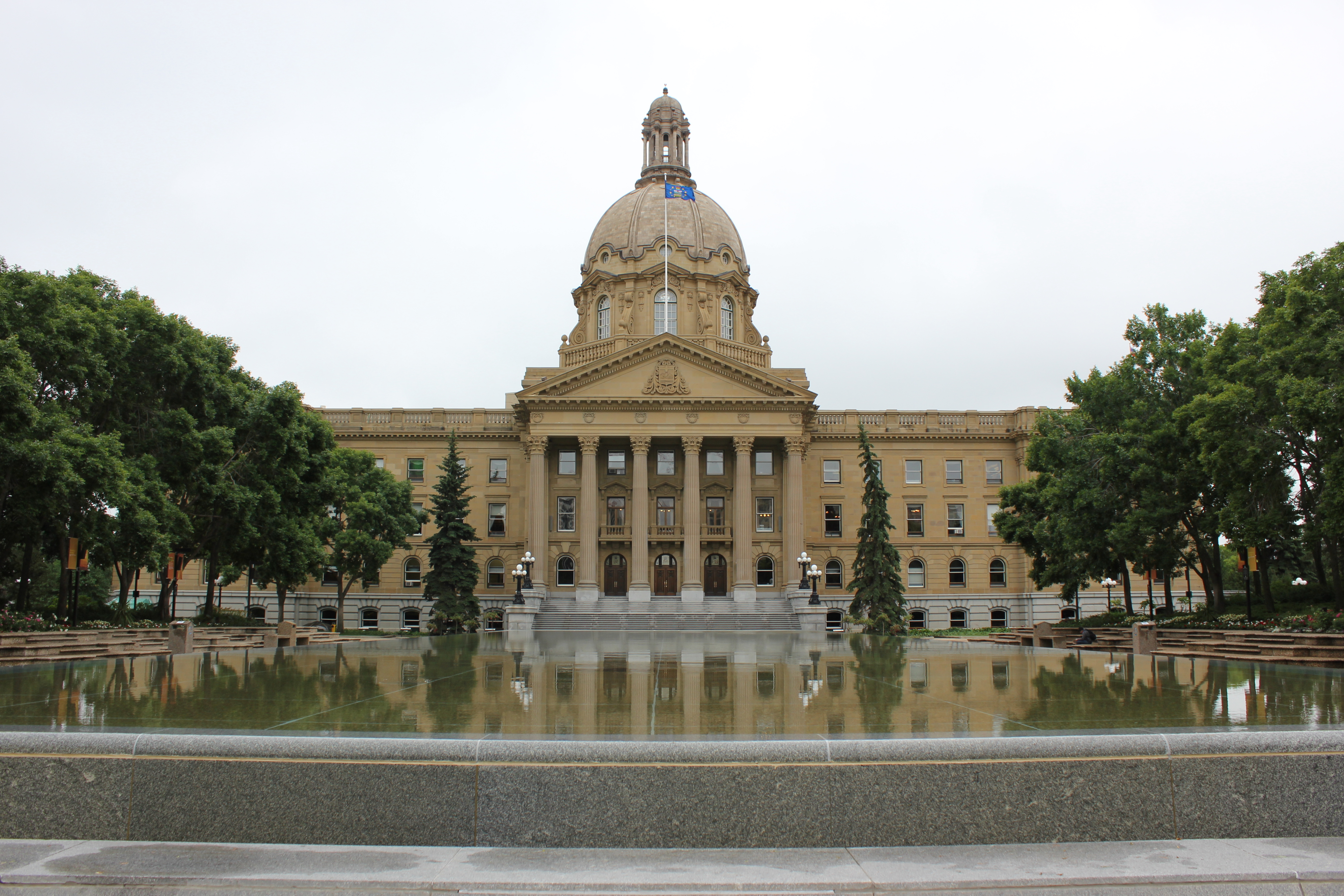

Legislative Assembly of Alberta
- Citation: Critical Infrastructure Defence Act, SA 2020, c C-32.7
- Enacted by: Alberta Legislature
- Royal assent: June 17, 2020
- Effective: June 17, 2020

Legislative history
- Bill title: Bill 1, Legislature 30, Session 2
- Introduced by: Jason Kenney, Premier of Alberta
- First reading: February 25, 2020
- Second reading: May 27, 2020 (passed)
- Third reading: May 28, 2020
- Status: In force

The Critical Infrastructure Defence Act, tabled as Bill 1, is a law introduced into the Legislative Assembly of Alberta in 2020 which seeks to legally define essential infrastructure and create offences and penalties for those who enter, destroy, or obstruct infrastructure. It was introduced on February 25, 2020, and received royal assent on June 17.

The bill drew criticism for targeting Indigenous groups, and some believe that it violates aspects of the Canadian Charter of Rights and Freedoms.

== Background ==
The bill was introduced in response to the 2020 Canadian pipeline and railway protests. Protesters of the Wetʼsuwetʼen First Nation objected to the construction of the Coastal GasLink Pipeline (CGL) through 190 kilometres (120 mi) of their unceded traditional territory in British Columbia. Protesters blocked construction of the pipeline, preventing workers from accessing parts of the site. On February 6, 2020, the Royal Canadian Mounted Police enforced a court-ordered injunction by arresting those blocking construction. In February and March solidarity protests sprang up all over the country and included blockades of a port in Vancouver, a rail line in Ontario, and commuter trails in Quebec. Roads and bridges were blockaded in Calgary, Winnipeg, and Regina.

Solidarity protests occurred in both Calgary and Edmonton, including a railway blockade in Edmonton. In Calgary, approximately 200 protesters marched from TC Energy Tower in downtown Calgary to Reconciliation Bridge on February 10. They blocked traffic for 2 hours at the intersection of Memorial Drive and Edmonton Trail, before returning to the bridge at police's request. Protesters connected with police prior to the protest and it was a peaceful event. No arrests were made. In Edmonton, approximately 60 protesters marched along Jasper Avenue and 109 Street on February 14. Police asked motorists to avoid the area. One protester was taken into custody for allegedly blocking traffic, but was later released with no charges. In Edmonton on February 19, approximately 20 protesters blockaded a Canadian National (CN) Railway line for around 12 hours before about 30 counter-protesters dismantled it. Protesters and counter-protesters argued, but there was no violence. Eastbound and westbound railcars carrying perishables, industrial products and flammable products were stopped. CN's superintendent of network operations Jason Hilmanowski said the impact of the blockade was “severe” and would compound every hour the line was blocked, since it would take several days to deal with the backlog of goods created for customers. CN’s lawyer Adrian Elmslie said that the blockade was a safety issue, creating a situation in which dangerous goods could be improperly stored. CN was granted a 30-day injunction against the protesters.

Nationwide blockades and rail delays were said to have had a negative impact on the province's industries, including economic losses in both agriculture and propane.

On February 25, Bill 1 was introduced by Premier of Alberta Jason Kenney.

"In recent weeks we have seen lawlessness jeopardize the Canadian economy, leading to the loss of tens of thousands of jobs here in Alberta and across the Dominion. [...]this is making a mockery of the principle of the rule of law, one of the foundational principles of our democratic life together. Therefore, the government tables this legislation to strengthen penalties against those who would lawlessly trespass or jeopardize public safety by seeking to block critical public infrastructure, including roadways, railways, and other important infrastructure. This reinforces public safety. It increases the dissuasive effect of law against those who would seek to hold us all jeopardy to their radical demands." — Jason Kenny, Premier of Alberta

Kenney said of the bill: “The right to protest does not include being able to prevent your neighbours from getting to work and putting food on the table, or threatening their security. Albertans expect their government to deal with lawlessness and stand up for the values that all law-abiding citizens share. This government is doing just that.” Minister of Justice and Solicitor General Doug Schweitzer echoed these sentiments:

“Over the last number of weeks, Albertans have witnessed the level of economic damage that a small group of lawbreakers can cause through blockades and other illegal protests. Our government will not stand idly by and allow Alberta to be an economic hostage to illegal activity now or ever. The Critical Infrastructure and Defence Act will help protect our way of life by ensuring the rule of law is upheld and the infrastructure that is critical to our province’s economy can continue to operate.”

== Law contents ==
According to the Government of Alberta, the law was introduced "to protect essential infrastructure from damage or interference caused by blockades, protests or similar activities". The law defines essential infrastructure, lists activities regarding essential infrastructure that are prohibited, and introduces penalties for violating any of the prohibited activities.

The law's definition of "essential infrastructure" includes:

- pipelines and related infrastructure
- oil and gas production and refinery sites
- utilities (electric, gas, and water)
- telecommunication lines, towers, and equipment
- highways
- railways
- mines

The law also "allow[s] regulations to expand the definition of essential infrastructure in the future if necessary"

=== Prohibited activities ===
Under the law, individuals (without lawful right, justification or excuse) are prohibited from:

- entering any essential infrastructure
- damaging or destroying any essential infrastructure
- obstructing, interrupting or interfering with the construction, maintenance, use or operation of any essential infrastructure in a manner that renders the essential infrastructure dangerous, useless, inoperative or ineffective
- aiding, counselling, or directing another person to commit an offence under the Act (whether or not the other person actually commits the offence)
- gaining permission to enter an infrastructure under false pretenses

=== Penalties ===
Individuals prosecuted under this law may be subject to penalties as follows:

- For a first offence: "a fine not less than $1000 and not exceeding $10 000, or to imprisonment for a term not exceeding 6 months, or to both a fine and imprisonment".
- Second or subsequent offence in relation to the same premise: "a fine not less than $1000 and not exceeding $25 000, or to imprisonment for a term not exceeding 6 months, or to both a fine and imprisonment"
- For corporations: "a fine not less than $10 000 and not exceeding $200 000"

Significant provisions:

- "Each day that a contravention continues constitutes a separate offence."
- "A peace officer may arrest, without warrant, any person the peace officer finds contravening [the act]."

== Criticism ==
=== Indigenous concerns ===
The law is a direct response to the Wetʼsuwetʼen protests. Many view it as a racially targeted law that violates Indigenous rights. Arthur Noskey, Grand Chief of the Treaty 8 First Nations of Alberta, called the bill "racialized" and said that it would aggravate tensions between police and Indigenous peoples, and provide justification for the arrest and brutalization of Indigenous peoples. Assembly of First Nations Alberta regional chief, Marlene Poitras, was concerned that many Indigenous peoples would not be able to afford the steep fines associated with Bill 1 violations, and many could end up being jailed. She was concerned that the bill would serve to exacerbate the issue of already high incarceration rates among Indigenous peoples in Canada. Alberta Liberal leader David Khan, a constitutional and Indigenous rights lawyer, said that new law could interfere with Indigenous peoples' rights to hunt, fish or gather on traditional land.

=== Potential Charter violations and concerns over the freedom to protest ===
A group of law professors from the University of Calgary who analyzed Bill 1 argued that it violates five different aspects of the Canadian Charter of Rights and Freedoms (the freedom of expression, freedom of peaceful assembly, freedom of association, the right to liberty, and the right to equality).

Climate Justice Edmonton organizer Alison McIntosh was concerned that the law could have a negative impact on grassroots protest movements in Alberta. President of the Alberta Federation of Labour, Gil McGowen, said the broadness of the law could allow the government to potentially shut down political demonstrations at the legislature or interfere with a strike picket line. McGowen said the federation would launch a constitutional challenge and called the legislation "fundamentally undemocratic."

David Khan said that the bill "criminalizes Albertans' Charter rights of freedom of thought, belief, opinion [and] expression, peaceful assembly [and] association, whether expressing themselves or protesting on private or public land, including city streets & sidewalks." He believed the law to be unconstitutional in part because it is overly broad and not proportional. Khan said that because the definition of essential infrastructure is "incredibly broad", the bill "criminalizes peaceful public protests/marches down city streets". Khan said that if "Bill 1 becomes law anyone participating in (or even helping organize) peaceful freedom of assembly/speech protests/marches on city streets (even on sidewalks!) for any reason could be arrested and charged and face $25000 in fines or six months in jail". He called the bill "political theatre", but noted that it had serious implications as "it will take years to challenge [bill 1] in our our courts–& meanwhile it puts a dangerous chill on Albertans' rights to express themselves & protest peacefully about important causes". Khan said that "existing laws (eg trespass laws) are more than sufficient to deal with protestors [sic] who get carried away or those who seek to take advantage of peaceful democratic protests to sow division & commit crimes".

== Constitutional challenge ==
On June 23, 2020, the Alberta Union of Provincial Employees (AUPE) filed a statement of claim against the law at Court of Queen's Bench of Alberta. The union argued that the law violates the rights of Albertans to peacefully protest and would hamper the union's ability to bargain collectively and to strike. AUPE president Guy Smith stated: "We will fight this all the way to the Supreme Court and we will defend any and all AUPE members or staff who are caught in the bill's crosshairs". Smith further said that the law "is an attack on our freedom to take part in peaceful protests". Smith said "In the past month, we have pledged to stand in solidarity with indigenous Albertans and black Albertans and we have always stood hand-in-hand with our fellow workers across sectors". The union was concerned with the lack of clarity about what constitutes "critical infrastructure".

The initial Queen's Bench decision found in favour of the AUPE. This was subsequently overturned by the Court of Appeal of Alberta. The Supreme Court of Canada then denied leave to appeal, on the basis that the AUPE lacked standing to challenge the law. This left the CIDA intact, without any express ruling on its constitutionality.

== See also ==
- Timeline of the 2020 Canadian pipeline and railway protests
- Premiership of Jason Kenney
