= Ministry of Municipal Affairs (Alberta) =

Ministry of the Executive Council of Alberta, Canada

Alberta Municipal Affairs

Agency overview
- Formed: 1912
- Jurisdiction: Alberta
- Headquarters: Edmonton, Alberta
- Annual budget: C$$1,229,911, (2019)
- Agency executives: Ric McIver, Minister of Municipal Affairs; Paul Wynnyk, Deputy Minister
- Website: www.alberta.ca/municipal-affairs.aspx

Alberta Municipal Affairs is a ministry of the Executive Council of Alberta. Its major responsibilities include assisting municipalities in the provision of local government, administering the assessment of linear property in Alberta, administering a safety system for the construction and maintenance of buildings and equipment, and managing Alberta's network of municipal and library system boards.

On January 4, 2021, Ric McIver became Acting Minister of Municipal Affairs, replacing Tracy Allard. On July 8 McIver was appointed Minister of Municipal Affairs. Rebecca Schulz became the minister of October 24, 2022.

== History ==
The Municipal Affairs ministry was established on December 20, 1911, with the purpose of implementing the new municipal legislation regarding incorporation of towns, villages, rural municipal districts, improvement districts and cities.

The ministry is responsible for enforcement of a variety of provincial legislation including:

- Municipal Government Act
- Local Authorities Election Act
- Emergency Management Act
- Libraries Act
- New Home Buyer Protection Act
- Safety Codes Act

On December 15, 2006, the new ministry of Municipal Affairs and Housing was created from Alberta Municipal Affairs and Seniors and Community Supports. Libraries, community and voluntary sector services, previously under the authority of Alberta Community Development, were amalgamated in the new ministry.

On March 12, 2008, Premier Stelmach reverted Municipal Affairs and Housing back to Municipal Affairs by moving the responsibilities over housing and the voluntary sector to the new ministries of Housing and Urban Affairs and Culture and Community Spirit respectively.

== Ministry structure ==
Alberta's Ministry of Municipal Affairs includes "Municipal Services and Legislation", "Municipal Assessment and Grants", "Corporate Strategic Services", and "Public Safety". The ministry also has oversight of the Municipal Government Board, the Alberta Emergency Management Agency, and the Special Areas Board.

Municipal Services and Legislation provides support, advice and other assistance in the areas of municipal government, administration and land use planning to Alberta's urban, rural and specialized municipalities. This division is also responsible for municipal inspections, viability reviews, and the Municipal Government Act Review. Branches include Municipal Services and Major Legislative Projects and Strategic Planning.

Municipal Assessment and Grants provides support, advice and other assistance in the areas of property assessment, education property taxes, and municipal grants to Alberta's urban, rural and specialized municipalities. This division is also responsible for the Municipal Sustainability Initiative (MSI) program, Federal Gas Tax program, and assessment of all linear property (e.g., oil/gas wells, pipelines, electric power lines, and telecommunication systems) in Alberta. Branches include Assessment Services and Grants and Education Property Tax.

Corporate Strategic Services provides support, advice and other assistance to other divisions within Municipal Affairs. Corporate Strategic Services is also responsible for the Public Library Services Branch, which provides policy, planning and administrative expertise to public libraries across Alberta.

Public Safety's mandate includes safe buildings, equipment and facilities and emergency response, regulated by the Safety Codes Act. Public Safety comprises Safety Services, the New Home Warranty and the Office of the Fire Commissioner.

=== Quasi-Judicial Boards ===
==== Land Compensation Board ====
The Land Compensation Board determines the amount of compensation to be paid when land is expropriated for a public service. In some cases, it is the body that recommends whether expropriation is warranted. The Land Compensation Board was under Alberta Environment and Parks until 2018.

==== Municipal Government Board ====
The Municipal Government Board is a provincial tribunal in Alberta, Canada. It is established pursuant to the Municipal Government Act. The MGB hears appeals from subdivision applications involving a provincial interest, appeals of linear property assessments, intermunicipal disputes, municipal annexations, and other matters.

==== New Home Buyer Protection Board ====
The New Home Buyer Protection Board hears appeals from the New Home Buyer Protection Office.

==== Surface Rights Board ====
The Surface Rights Board settles disputes between companies that have the right to drill for subsurface fossil fuels and the owners of the surface of the land. It can also direct the government to pay surface lease rentals on behalf of delinquent operators. The Surface Rights Board was under Alberta Environment and Parks until 2018.
