= Alberta Municipal Government Board =

Municipal Government Board
- Abbreviation: MGB
- Predecessor: Local Authorities Board; The Alberta Assessment Appeal Board; The Provincial Planning Board
- Formation: January 1, 1995; 31 years ago
- Type: Quasi-judicial body
- Legal status: active
- Headquarters: Edmonton, Alberta

The Alberta Municipal Government Board (MGB) is a provincial quasi-judicial tribunal in Alberta, Canada. The MGB is affiliated with the Alberta Ministry of Municipal Affairs. The MGB is established pursuant to the Municipal Government Act (MGA), which authorizes it to hear: appeals from subdivision applications involving a provincial interest, appeals of linear property assessments, intermunicipal disputes, municipal annexations, and other matters.

The MGB is composed of Board Members and Staff Members. Board Members are appointed for terms of up to 3 years by the Lieutenant Governor in Council, on recommendation by the Minister of Municipal Affairs. Board Member remuneration is determined by the Lieutenant Governor in Council and periodically updated. Head office is located in Edmonton and hearings are frequently heard in the city, however hearings are conducted throughout the province of Alberta.

== History ==
The Alberta MGB was established when the MGA came into force January 1, 1995. It has been called the "successor" to three different boards which were dissolved upon its creation:

1. The Local Authorities Board: Created in 1961 as an offshoot from the Public Utilities Board (Est. 1915), this was a quasi-judicial tribunal that heard matters related to taxation and land use issues, such as municipal debenture financing and annexations.
2. The Alberta Assessment Appeal Board: Created in 1956, this board heard appeals of property taxation disputes.
3. The Provincial Planning Board: Created in 1963 as a successor to the Town and Rural Advisory Planning Board (Est. 1929), this board heard appeals related to municipal land use plans.

Property assessment appeals comprised the bulk of the workload of the newly formed MGB, with appeals numbering in the thousands every year. However this changed in 2010 when the MGA was amended and jurisdiction for hearing property assessment appeals was transferred from the MGB to municipal Assessment Review Boards.

The MGB still has a role in hearing property assessment appeals as MGB Board Members regularly sit on municipal ARBs as a 'provincial member', which is required by Section 454.2(2) of the MGA. Additionally, the MGB is the first level of appeal for linear property assessment appeals. Linear property assessments are conducted by the Ministry of Municipal Affairs, as opposed to the municipality in which the linear property is located.

== Proceedings ==
The MGB has exercised its power to make procedural rules to govern its proceedings. Hearings are typically:

1. Open to the public,
2. Presided over by a three members panel, one of whom acts as the chair, and
3. Not subject to strict rules of evidence.

Written decisions are rendered following hearings and are publicly available on the internet.

== Jurisdiction ==
Section 488(1) of the MGA grants the MGB jurisdiction to:

1. Hear complaints about assessments for linear property (Ex. Pipelines, electrical power lines),
2. Hear any complaint related to the amount of an equalized assessment for a municipality,
3. Decide disputes between a management body (Ex. Capital Region Housing Corporation) and a municipality or between two or more management bodies, referred to it by the Minister under the Alberta Housing Act,
4. Inquire into and make recommendations about any matter referred to it by the Lieutenant Governor in Council or the Minister,
5. Deal with municipal annexations as contemplated by Part 4 of the Act,
6. Decide disputes involving regional service commissions pursuant to Section 602.15,
7. Hear appeals pursuant to Section 619,
8. Hear appeals from subdivision decisions pursuant to Section 678(2)(a), and
9. Decide intermunicipal disputes pursuant to Section 690.

=== Subdivision appeals ===
In Alberta, a landowner who wants to subdivide land must apply to the Subdivision Authority of the municipality where the property is located. The rules pertaining to whether or not the Subdivision Authority may approve a subdivision application are found in the MGA and the Subdivision and Development Regulation (Regulation). If a subdivision is not approved, or is conditionally approved, the landowner has the right to appeal that decision. The appeal normally lies before the Subdivision and Development Appeal Board of the municipality in which the property is located. However, pursuant to Section 678(2)(a) there are several instances in which the appeal lies before the MGB:

1. If the land is within a "Green Area" (As defined by the Public Lands Act);
2. If the land is within 800 metres of a highway with a speed limit of at least 80 km/h;
3. If the land contains or is adjacent to a body of water, or the bed or shore of a body of water;
4. If the land is within 300 metres of a sewage treatment facility; or
5. If the land is within 300 – 450 metres of a waste management facility.

=== Linear property assessment appeals ===
Linear Property is defined by the MGA as including property such as:

1. Electric power systems,
2. Street lighting systems, and
3. Pipelines and wells used in the oil and gas industry.

The MGB is responsible for hearing complaints related to linear property assessments. Provincial property assessors annually assess linear property and assign it a value; this value is multiplied by a mill rate to determine the amount of property tax that must be paid by the owner of the linear property.

=== Annexations ===
Municipalities in Alberta can initiate annexation proceedings, subject to certain conditions contained in Part 4, Division 6 of the MGA. Pursuant to Section 114 of the MGA, a municipality may only annex land that is contiguous with the boundaries of the municipality. The MGA requires affected municipalities to meet and discuss annexation proposals and to use mediation on matters which cannot be agreed upon. Following these negotiations, the initiating municipality produces a report of the negotiations that is sent to all affected authorities and the MGB. From there, the annexation typically proceeds in one of two ways:

1. General Agreement on Annexation: If the MGB is satisfied that the affected municipal authorities and the public are generally in agreement on the annexation, then the public will be notified of the annexation intentions. If there are no objections received, then there is no requirement for a public hearing. However, if objections are received, a public hearing must be held.
2. No General Agreement on Annexation: If the MGB is not satisfied that the affected municipalities or the public are in general agreement with the annexation, then the MGB may launch an investigation into the annexation and must hold a public hearing in regards to the annexation.

If a public hearing is required, then the MGB will publish notice of the hearing and conduct the hearing in the affected area. "Any affected person" may appear and be heard at the hearing. After the hearing, the MGB prepares a report containing its findings and recommendations, which is delivered to the Minister of Municipal Affairs. The Minister may then recommend the annexation to the Lieutenant Governor in Council, "who may by order annex land from a municipal authority to another municipal authority".

=== Intermunicipal disputes ===
The MGA allows any municipality to appeal the provisions of new statutory plans or land use bylaws of adjacent municipalities if it believes those provisions may be detrimental to it. If the MGB agrees that the provision of the statutory plan or land use bylaw provision is detrimental, it may order the provision to be amended or repealed.
