= Angela Bennett =

Australian mining heiress (born c.1943/44)

- Born: Angela Wright circa 1943 (age 82–83) (Note: In 2025, the Australian Financial Review reported Bennett as born in 1945 (age 80–81).)
- Occupation: Mining heiress
- Known for: Wright Prospecting
- Spouse: Peter Bennett
- Children: 7 (Paul, Grant, Todd, Peter (Jnr), David, William, Rebecca)
- Parents: Peter Wright (1908–1985); adopted (father); Pauline McClemans (mother)
- Relatives: Michael Wright (brother, 1937–2012); Julian Wright (brother)

Angela Bennett (born c. 1943/1944) is an Australian mining heiress and businesswoman.

== Biography ==
Bennett is the eldest adopted child of Pauline McClemans and Peter Wright, who co-founded Wright Prospecting and was a business partner of Lang Hancock. After her father's sudden death in 1985, Bennett and one of her brothers, Michael Wright, took over Wright Prospecting. Michael was also the owner of the Voyager Estate winery in Margaret River, until his death in 2012.

Bennett's other brother, Julian Wright, was estranged from the family after he claimed that Angela and Michael duped him over a financial separation agreement for his portion of Wright Prospecting, signed in 1987. Julian Wright commenced legal proceedings in the WA Supreme Court against his siblings. His case was dismissed; he sought leave to appeal to the High Court that was rejected, and he was ordered to pay his sibling's legal fees.

Bennett heads Wright Prospecting; and two of her sons, Todd and Paul, are involved in daily management of the business.

After a twelve-year legal battle, in 2010, Bennett and Michael Wright received A$1 billion from Gina Rinehart after the latter was forced to give up twenty-five per cent in the Rhodes Ridges iron ore mine, located 60 kilometres (37 mi) west of Newman in the Pilbara. In 2025, Bennett sold a fifteen per stake in the Rhodes Ridges iron ore deposit to Mitsui & Co for A$2 billion; and retained a ten per cent interest in the project which is not expected to produce first ore before 2030. Her nieces, the daughters of Michael Wright, Leonie Baldock and Alexadra Burt, sold their full 25 per cent interest in Rhodes Ridges and share A$3.4 billion.

Bennett owns fifteen per cent of Hamersley Iron shares from the Rio Tinto Group; Rinehart ownes the other fifty per cent.

In September 2012, Bennett sued Rinehart to recover fifty per cent of 4, 5 and 6 tenements of the Hope Downs mine, named after Rinehart's mother, Hope Hancock. The first hearing was held in 2023.

== Personal life ==
Bennett is married to Peter Bennett and they have seven children. In 2003 she had an operation to remove a brain cancer. Bennett is considered reclusive and is rarely seen in public.

One of her sons, Todd, has previously served as a director of Apex Mineral, and as a director of the Finance and Energy Exchange. Another son, Grant, was declared bankrupt, following a business deal that was unsuccessful. Her only daughter, Rebecca, converted to Islam upon marriage.

=== Net worth ===
According to the Financial Review 2025 Rich List, Bennett was the fifth-richest woman in Australia by net worth, assessed at $8.41 billion. The predecessor to this list, the BRW Rich 200, assessed her net worth at A$1.55 billion in 2014. In September 2009, she sold her home in the Mosman Park neighbourhood of Perth for A$57.5 million and downsized to an A$8 million apartment in West Perth. In 2010, she sold her A$20 million yacht.

Year	Financial Review Rich List		Forbes Australia's 50 Richest	
Year	Rank	Net worth (A$)	Rank	Net worth (US$)
2011			12 ▲	$1.55 billion ▲
2012			9 ▲	$2.30 billion ▼
2013			30 ▼	$0.90 billion ▼
2014		$1.55 billion	25 ▲	$1.01 billion ▲
2015			31 ▼	$0.97 billion ▼
2016			29 ▲	$0.93 billion ▼
2017		$1.76 billion	23 ▲	$1.70 billion ▲
2018	27 ▲	$2.17 billion ▲		
2019	28 ▲	$2.62 billion ▲	24 ▼	$1.65 billion ▼
2020	21 ▲	$3.83 billion ▲		
2021	24 ▼	$4.13 billion ▲		
2022	24	$5.00 billion ▲		
2023	20 ▲	$4.63 billion ▼		
2024	22 ▼	$5.04 billion ▲		
2025	18 ▲	$8.41 billion ▲		

Legend
Icon	Description
Steady	Has not changed from the previous year
▲	Has increased from the previous year
▼	Has decreased from the previous year

=== Philanthropy ===
In October 2024 it was reported that Bennett made a donation for an undisclosed amount to support the construction of a 11-storey shelter in Perth for women and children who are homeless, named The Angela Wright Bennett Centre. In 2015, the Angela Wright Bennett Foundation granted 250,000 to support autism research at the Kids Research Institute Australia. The Foundation is a founding partner of Earth4All, a global environmental non-profit initiative of the Club of Rome focused on developing new economic thinking to support the impact of changing climatic conditions.
