= Michael Wright (Australian businessman) =

Australian businessman (1937–2012)

- Born: 1937; Western Australia
- Died: 2012 (aged 74–75); Perth, Western Australia
- Education: Christ Church Grammar School
- Occupations: Grazier; viticulturist; investor
- Known for: Wright Prospecting; Voyager Estate
- Spouses: 1. ??; 2. Jennifer Mary Turner (divorced); 3. Elizabeth Mead; 4. Mary Ann Wright (m. 1997, divorced)
- Children: Alexandra Burt (Turner); Leonie Baldock (Turner); Myles Wright (Turner); Olivia Mead (Mead)
- Parents: Peter Wright (1908–1985) (father); Pauline McClemans (mother)
- Relatives: Angela Bennett (adopted sister); Julian Wright (brother)

Michael Wright (1937–2012) was an Australian heir and businessman. Principally a grazier, on the death of his father Wright squired a share in Wright Prospecting that had significant iron ore tenements in Western Australia. He was a teetotaller who developed an interest in viticulture and owned a winery.

== Early life ==
His grandfather, Canon McClemans, founded Christ Church Grammar School. His father, Peter Wright, co-founded Hancock Prospecting and Wright Prospecting with the late Lang Hancock. Wright's elder adopted sister is Angela Bennett; and his younger brother is Julian Wright.

Wright was born in Western Australia and attended Christ Church Grammar School.

== Career ==
He started his career in the family concern, at Wright Prospecting. In 1991, he bought the Voyager Estate winery in Margaret River, Western Australia, despite being a teetotaller. He sat on the Board of Governors at the University of Notre Dame Australia in Fremantle.

After his father's sudden death in 1985, he inherited a $900 million fortune with his sister.

Wright's brother, Julian Wright, was estranged from the family after he claimed that Angela Bennett and Michael duped him over a financial separation agreement for his portion of Wright Prospecting, signed in 1987. Julian Wright commenced legal proceedings in the WA Supreme Court against his siblings. His case was dismissed; he sought leave to appeal to the High Court that was rejected, and he was ordered to pay his sibling's legal fees.

After a twelve-year legal battle, in 2010, Wright and Bennett received A$1 billion from Gina Rinehart after the latter was forced to give up twenty-five per cent in the Rhodes Ridges iron ore mine, located 60 kilometres (37 mi) west of Newman in the Pilbara. Following Michael Wright's death in 2012, his daughters, Leonie Baldock and Alexadra Burt, sold their full 25 per cent interest in Rhodes Ridges and share A$3.4 billion in 2025. Wright's sister, Bennett, sold a fifteen per stake in the Rhodes Ridges iron ore deposit to Mitsui & Co for A$2 billion; and retained a ten per cent interest in the project which is not expected to produce first ore before 2030.

Prior to his death, Wright and Bennett owned fifteen per cent of Hamersley Iron shares from the Rio Tinto Group; Rinehart owns the other fifty per cent. Wright's interests passed to his daughters, upon his death.

In September 2012, Bennett and Wright's daughters sued Rinehart to recover fifty per cent of 4, 5 and 6 tenements of the Hope Downs mine, named after Rinehart's mother, Hope Hancock. The first hearing was held in 2023.

== Personal life ==
Wright's second wife was Jennifer Turner who was the mother to Alexandra Burt, Leonie Baldock, and Myles Wright. He and Turner subsequently divorced and Turner died in 2017. Wright had a relationship out of wedlock with Elizabeth Mead and they conceived a daughter, Olivia Jacqueline, who was raised by Mead and her partner, with Wright paying some child support. Wright's fourth relationship was with Mary Ann Wright who he met in a New Orleans bar. They married and subsequently divorced, without bearing children.

In his will, Wright left the overwhelming majority of his c.$1.2—$1.5 billion estate equally to Burt and Baldock, and made provisions for Mary Ann Wright, Olivia Mead, and Myles Wright, the latter who was gifted $20 million. Mary Ann Wright sued Burt and Baldock and the executor of his estate. The matter was settled out of court on undisclosed terms. The terms of Wright's will stipulated that Olivia Mead was bequeathed $3 million, which was less than 0.5 per cent of Wright’s fortune at the time of his death. Mead could only access the funds when she was aged 30 years and would lose the money if she ever joined a non-traditional church, was convicted of drink-driving, and other arcane conditions. Consequently, Mead sued Burt and Baldock and the executor claiming that she was entitled to a significant house, luxury items, and cash. The matter was contested in court and Mead was awarded an Australian record sum of $25 million, later reduced to $6.1 million on appeal. Mead received $3 million at the time of the 2015 judgement; with the remaining $3.1 million set aside in a trust fund until she reaches the age of 30 years.

Prior to his death, Wright's net worth was aggregated with that of his sister's. The Australian Financial Review 2025 Rich List assessed the net worth of two of his daughters, Burt and Baldock, at A$7.18 billion.
