= Alberta coal policy controversy =

Conflicts over coal mining in Canada

== Selected timeline of events related to the Alberta coal policy controversy ==
- 1976 – Then Progressive Conservative government under Premier Peter Lougheed introduced the Coal Development Policy, which governed coal exploration and development in Alberta by classifying land into four categories: Category 1, where no exploration or development was allowed, to Category 4, where all exploration and development, both surface and underground, could be approved if appropriate. The Policy blocked surface coal mines on a 1,500,000 hectares (15,000 km^{2}) wide swath of the foothills of the Rocky Mountains, and the headwaters of Alberta's major watersheds.
- 1983 – The last open-pit coal mine in Alberta's Livingstone Range, a sub-range of the Canadian Rockies which forms the eastern boundary of the Rockies in the south of Alberta, Grassy Mountain, closed in 1983. Newer mines that were "cheaper and safer" on the British Columbia side of the Crowsnest Pass began operating. For coal miners on the Alberta side of the Pass, who had worked in one of the five mines on the Alberta side—Blairmore, Frank, Bellevue, Coleman, and Hillcrest—this marked the end of a century when the region was the biggest coal centre in Alberta.
- 2012 or 2013 – Elan acquired coal lease applications in southwestern Alberta "for the purpose of developing a coal project".
- 2013 – Benga Mining Ltd., a subsidiary of Hancock Prospecting and Northback's predecessor, originally conducted exploration work on Grassy Mountain from 2013 to 2016. Benga Mining Limited—then a wholly owned subsidiary of Riversdale Resources began seeking approval from both the federal and provincial governments for the Grassy Mountain Coal Project (GMCP). (Note: The Grassy Mountain Coal Project (GMCP) project was originally proposed by Benga Mining Limited, which was a wholly-owned subsidiary of Riversdale Resources. In 2019, the Australian mining magnate, Gina Rinehart—one of Australia's wealthiest individuals—through her company Hancock Prospecting, acquired Riversdale Resources for $700 million CDN, including the GMCP. Riversdale Resources/Benga Mining officially changed its name to Northback Holdings Corp. in July 2023. Therefore, the project initially advanced under Benga Mining/Riversdale Resources, and is now being pursued by Northback Holdings Corp., both ultimately owned by Gina Rinehart.)
- 2015 – Benga's proposal for an open-pit metallurgical coal mine located on "legacy mining lands", Grassy Mountain Coal Project (GMCP), was submitted. The Grassy Mountain Coal Project, proposed by Australian mining magnate Gina Rinehart's company, has been a contentious issue in Alberta since 2015. The proposed area to be covered is 2,800 hectares (28 km^{2}).
- July 2016 – During the premiership of Rachel Notley, the Ram River Coal Aries Project was granted an exemption to Alberta's Coal Policy. Mining companies, including Atrum Coal, in their lobblying activities to have the Coal Policy cancelled, have cited this exemption. A 2016 letter to RRCC from the Alberta Government said that "as is the case elsewhere across Alberta, the permitting of surface mining activities is subject to regulatory review and approval, and subject to RRCC receiving the necessary approvals. Surface mining of the shallower portions of the Ram River property can be conducted." The Ram River area was classified Category 2 under the Coal Development Policy for Alberta from 1976, "in which underground mining may be considered, but development by surface mining is not normally considered." This letter led to several other companies applying for and receiving coal leases and exploration permits in Category 2 Lands.
- 2016 – Riversdale Resources submitted a 263-page description of the proposed Grassy Mountain Coal Project to the Impact Assessment Agency of Canada (IAAC).
- August 16, 2018 – On August 16, 2018, the Minister of Environment and Climate Change and the chief executive officer of the Alberta Energy Regulator (AER) announced the establishment of the GMCP Joint Review Panel (JRP) with three members: Alex Bolton, Hans Matthews, and Dean O'Gorman. The JRP's task was to fulfill the responsibilities of both the provincial and federal acts and requirements defined by the Alberta Energy Regulator (AER) and the Canadian Environmental Assessment Act, 2012 (CEAA 2012) in regard to the GMCP.
- 2019 – According to Alberta Views, global investors, mainly from Australia, are interested in the region and are following the review process closely.
- 2019 – Northback, a subsidiary of an Australian company owned by Gina Rinehart, Hancock Prospecting, acquired Riversdale Resources' for $CDN 700 million in 2019 which included the GMCP while the project was under review by the JPR. It is Northback's Grassy Mountain Coal Project (GMCP) that garnered the most attention. GMCP is a proposed open-pit metallurgical coal mine located on "legacy mining lands" 7 kilometres (4.3 mi) north of the town of Blairmore in the Alberta side of the Rocky Mountains's Crowsnest Pass, a region with a century-long history of coal mining that ended in 1983. The proposed area to be covered is 2,800 hectares (28 km^{2}). The company claimed that the GMCP's production of coal would reach 93 million tonnes over twenty-three years.

=== 2020 ===
- June 1 — the United Conservative government under Premier Jason Kenney rescinded the 1976 Coal Policy, removing restrictions on coal mining exploration and development on three of four land categories based on environmental sensitivity. The UCP's new policy only protected Category 1 lands, while Category 2 lands—including the "moderately to highly environmentally sensitive" Livingstone Range—were opened to potential coal development. The revocation affected approximately 190,000 hectares (1,900 km^{2}) of previously restricted headwater regions and did not include new land-management protocols. The policy change sparked public backlash, legal actions, and the issuing of new leases to coal companies.
- July 15 to September 15 – With no land-use management plan in place, new exploration leases—including Montem Resources and Benga Mining Ltd.'s in December 2020—were granted and applications were approved. AER approved 240,000 hectares (2,400 km^{2}) lease applications in sensitive, former Category 2 lands on the Eastern Slopes. Over 100,000 hectares (1,000 km^{2}) of lease applications were granted in Clearwater County (specifically in the Bighorn Backcountry) where the source waters for the City of Edmonton, and much of central Alberta and Saskatchewan come from.
- December – New leases were granted near the popular recreational areas of Goldeye Lake, Fish Lake, and Crescent Falls. A total of eleven leases were purchased by Montem Resources and Benga Mining Ltd.

=== 2021 ===
- January 18 – The Government of Alberta halts sales in the former Category 2 lands and revokes the 11 coal leases issued during the December 2020 auction—though these leases represent just 0.2% of the land area that had previously been leased.
- June – In June 2021, the GMCP Joint Review Panel announced that the GMCP proposal was rejected because of significant environmental concerns, saying that it was not in the public interest. The Panel received significant evidence against GMCP from a variety of organizations and groups, including The Livingstone Landowners Group, The Canadian Parks and Wilderness Society (CPAWS), The Municipal District of Ranchland No. 66, the Timberwolf Wilderness Society, the Alberta Chapter of the Wildlife Society, the Crowsnest Conservation Society, the Oldman Watershed Council. In addition to these groups, several Indigenous groups, including the Káínai First Nation, Piikani Nation, Siksika Nation, Stoney Nakoda Nations, Tsuut'ina Nation, Métis Nation of Alberta – Region 3, Ktunaxa Nation, Shuswap Indian Band, and Samson Cree Nation provided information. The panel also received input from individuals, such as landowners adjacent to the project, and government bodies. The Government of Canada provided expert information through the review process. The Alberta Geological Survey provided information about the potential effects of the project on Turtle Mountain, Alberta.
  - — According to a 2021 University of Calgary Public Policy paper submitted to the Alberta Coal Policy Committee, which studied the implications of coal mining in the province, with a focus on the Eastern Slopes of the Rocky Mountains, in 2020/2021 coal mining royalty revenue in Alberta accounted for 0.4% of natural resource revenue. From 1997 and 2017, coal mining accounted for 0.2% of the province's GDP in current dollars. The report says that the financial gains of allowing a hypothetical coal mine in the Rockies eastern foothills of, including $440 million in undiscounted additional tax revenues and $35 million in undiscounted employment earnings, would be outweighed by the drawbacks, such as the disruption to ranching and tourism, along with adverse environmental impacts on water, vegetation, air, and wildlife.
  - — The legal status of Northback's proposal for the Grassy Mountain Coal Project was under scrutiny due to conflicting interpretations of its "advanced project" designation. Northback Holdings Corporation, previously known as Benga Mining Ltd., has resubmitted a proposal for the Grassy Mountain project after it was initially rejected by both federal and provincial regulators in 2021 on the grounds that it was not in the public interest.

=== 2022 ===
- — Beginning in 2020, there was significant opposition to the UCP government's decision to remove protections from lands safeguarded under the 1978 Coal Act without public consultation, leading to widespread public backlash and legal actions. In response, the government reinstated the 1976 Coal Policy and, in March 2022, implemented a moratorium on coal exploration and development in the Eastern Slopes of Alberta's Rocky Mountains. Alberta's energy minister Sonya Savage announced via ministerial decree that "no new applications will be accepted" for coal exploration, except for "advanced coal projects."
- July — Ongoing policy changes led to the first major legal challenges from coal companies, with Cabin Ridge filing a $CDN 3.441-billion lawsuit against the Alberta government. The company argued that the province's rescission of the 1976 coal policy signaled there were no unique restrictions to developing a metallurgical coal project. In September 2022, Elan filed its own multibillion-dollar lawsuit at Calgary's Court of King's Bench.
- September – Elan filed its multi-billion-dollar lawsuit at Calgary's Court of King's Bench.

=== 2023 ===
- August and September — Gina Rinehart's Northback Holdings Corporation submitted their proposals to "conduct a large coal exploration program on Grassy Mountain'. Along with the Coal Exploration Program, the request to the Alberta Energy Regulator (AER) included a Deep Drill Permit and a Temporary Diversion License, all aimed at collecting site-specific technical data related to the Grassy Mountain Project.
- September 19 – Grassy Mountain was described as a "key piece of land in Alberta's coal mining debate", according to Global News.
- September 19 – Grassy Mountain was described as a "key piece of land in Alberta's coal mining debate", according to Global News.
- December – The $CDN 15-billion combined lawsuits as of December 2023, alleged that changes in coal mining regulations by the Alberta government had resulted in significant financial losses and a "de facto expropriation" of their coal assets, and negatively impacted their investments and property rights. Alberta's policy changes resulted in legal action from five Australian coal companies—Evolve Power Ltd. (formerly Montem Resources Ltd.), Cabin Ridge Holdings Ltd. and Cabin Ridge Project Ltd., Atrum Coal Ltd. and its subsidiary, Elan Coal Ltd., Black Eagle Mining Corp., and Northback Holdings, seeking damages from the Alberta government.
- December – To address concerns over environmental impacts, Minister Jean announced the Coal Industry Modernization Initiative (CIMI) which would include communication with stakeholders including municipalities, First Nations and Albertans in 2024 and 2025., CIMI was allegedly included policy aimed at preventing selenium contamination in Alberta's watersheds. This initiative was influenced by pollution issues linked to Teck Resources in the Elk Valley, which have played a significant role in shaping public opinion and government policy regarding coal mining in the region.

=== 2024 ===
- February 23 – The Alberta Energy Regulator (AER) accepted Northback's application, citing that the project qualifies as an "advanced coal project" because a project summary and environmental impact assessment were submitted prior to a ministerial order that paused new coal developments in 2022. The decision follows clarification from the Energy and Minerals Minister Brian Jean, who stated the controversial open-pit coal mine on the eastern slopes Rocky Mountains remains an "advanced project" that has already been rejected as not being in the public interest twice. This has sparked mixed reactions, with the local community seeing potential economic benefits, while landowners and environmental groups express frustration. Opponents are considering legal challenges, arguing the project is legally defunct due to prior denials. Northback remains committed to addressing concerns and ensuring responsible exploration.
- June — Northback filed its first lawsuit against the federal and Alberta governments.
- November — A non-binding referendum was held by the Municipality of Crowsnest Pass in which 3,052 of 5,695 residents voted, with 1,957 voting in favour of the Grassy Mountain Coal Project (GMCP), representing 72%. Rinehart's company actively participated in organizing the controversial local vote, which has been criticized for potentially disenfranchising downstream water users and the broader Alberta population. The municipality, amalgamated in 1978, includes towns reorganized with carve outs to the MD of Ranchland No. 66, and the Grassy Mountain mine—located 7 miles north of Blairmore—straddles both municipalities.
- December – Premier Smith and her administration displayed renewed interest in and support for the Grassy Mountain Coal Project (GMCP). Plans were announced to ban new mountaintop removal and open-pit coal developments on the eastern slopes of the Rocky Mountains, but specifically exempted the Grassy Mountain project from these new rules. Smith also announced that new coal mining regulations would be developed by the end of 2025, including higher environmental standards and substantially increased royalty rates. The government clarified that these new rules would not apply to "advanced proposals," such as the GMCP, allowing it to proceed under existing regulations.
- December – This ongoing controversy has sparked public demonstrations, with hundreds protesting to protect water security in the region.

== 2025 ==
- Five coal companies are suing the Alberta government for compensation, including Evolve Power Ltd. (formerly Montem Resources Ltd.), Cabin Ridge Holdings Ltd. and Cabin Ridge Project Ltd., Atrum Coal Ltd. and its subsidiary, Elan Coal Ltd., Black Eagle Mining Corp., and Northback Holdings. They are collectively seeking over $15 billion in damages related to Alberta's coal policy changes Four of these companies (Evolve Power, Cabin Ridge, Atrum Coal, and Black Eagle Mining) have filed separate statements of claim that will be heard together in April 2025. Northback Holdings launched its damages claim in June 2024 and will be heard separately. The companies allege that Alberta's 2022 decision to change coal mining rules resulted in financial losses and a "de facto expropriation" of their coal assets. They argue that the government's policy changes have negatively impacted their investments and property rights.
- January — Energy and Minerals Minister Brian Jean lifted the moratorium on coal exploration and development that had been in place since March 2022, opening approximately 190,000 hectares (1,900 km^{2}) of previously restricted, environmentally sensitive land—excluding Category 1 areas such as parks, wilderness areas, and wildlife sanctuaries—to potential coal projects. The government stated the decision was intended to "reduce regulatory confusion" around coal mining. Made without public consultation, the move reignited public debate, with environmental groups, First Nations, and members of the public voicing strong opposition over concerns about water contamination from selenium, habitat destruction, and threats to wildlife.
  - — At a press conference in January 2025, Premier Danielle Smith defended lifting the coal exploration ban by citing the need to protect taxpayers from over $15 billion in potential damages sought by five coal companies due to earlier policy changes. However, the move may not fully resolve the legal challenges, as at least one lawsuit remains active despite the moratorium's end, suggesting the province's exposure to potential damages may persist. The ongoing disputes underscore the complex balance between resource development, environmental protection, and fiscal responsibility in Alberta's energy policy.
  - — The lifting of the moratorium has led to renewed concerns about the potential long-term ecological impacts of coal development in Alberta's sensitive landscapes. Critics argue that the government lifted the moratorium before fully implementing a comprehensive coal policy, raising concerns about transparency and prioritization of industry interests over environmental protection. Approximately 190,000 ha (470,000 acres) of previously restricted and environmentally sensitive areas are now potentially open to coal development. The Alberta chapter of the Canadian Parks and Wilderness Society (CPAWS) warned that recent policy changes could allow coal exploration and development to start on over 1,800 km^{2} (440,000 acres) of leases as early as spring 2025. This development coincides with Northback Holdings' proposed Grassy Mountain Coal Project (GMCP) in the Crowsnest Pass advancing through regulatory review. CPAWS indicated that the Grassy Mountain project may now move forward without facing a major regulatory barrier.

— The Alberta Court of Appeal has granted the Municipal District of Ranchland leave to appeal the AER's decision, indicating that there are serious, arguable issues with the regulator's interpretation of coal development regulations. Meanwhile, the government has initiated consultations with industry players on implementing the new coal regulations. The ongoing controversy highlights broader tensions between economic development, environmental protection, and government transparency in Alberta's resource sector.

- May 15 — Alberta Energy Regulator gave Northback approval to explore for coal on Grassy Mountain.
- June — According to the Canadian Press, a provincial report by Alberta government scientists found that chemicals from legacy coal mines in the Crowsnest Pass are contaminating local waterways and poisoning fish, prompting the province to issue a consumption advisory for fish from Crowsnest Lake due to elevated selenium levels in three species. The study also warned that further mining activity in the area could result in the population collapse of fish species in the lake.
- July — According to a peer review article in the Environmental Pollution journal, water quality downstream of three Rocky Mountain coal mines in Alberta remained negatively affected decades after mine closure and reclamation, with selenium and other contaminants still elevated above guidelines for aquatic life. The research concluded that current reclamation practices and regulatory requirements have not met objectives for protecting water quality and aquatic ecosystems downstream of coal mines in the McLeod River basin. This study highlighted persistent impacts in areas such as Luscar Creek and Gregg River, raising concerns over the effectiveness of provincial coal mining regulations.
- August 8 — A government-commissioned study revealed that selenium and other contaminants continue to exceed safe levels in rivers downstream of reclaimed coal mines.
- August 17 –Experts and Lethbridge West MLA Rob Miyashiro publicly warned that persistent elevated selenium and heavy metals downstream of mountaintop coal mines—the subject of an Alberta government study—raise serious concerns for aquatic life, endangered species, and the region's agri-food sector, reigniting debate over the province's approach to coal mining regulation.
- August 21 - CEO of Alberta Energy Regulator cancels the public hearing for Summit 14 Mine at the request of the coal company, denying Alberta Wilderness Association and CPAWS Northern Alberta the right to present.

=== Status of GMCP as an "advanced project" ===
Energy Minister Brian Jean has asserted that once a project is classified as advanced, it retains that status regardless of previous rejections, stating, "Once a project is considered an advanced project it remains as one". This position is supported by the AER, which indicates that a letter from the minister carries significant weight in guiding their decisions.

However, legal experts, including Nigel Bankes from the University of Calgary, argue that the original project is effectively "legally dead" due to its previous denials and should not be considered for new applications.

The situation has escalated with public hearings taking place to assess Northback's proposal amidst considerable opposition from environmental groups and local residents concerned about potential impacts on land and water resources. Additionally, the Alberta Court of Appeal is set to hear arguments regarding whether Northback's application should be allowed to proceed under the current legal framework.

The legality of Northback's proposal hinges on interpretations of regulatory definitions and past decisions. While the Alberta government and AER maintain that it qualifies as an advanced project, significant opposition and legal challenges suggest that this classification may be contested in court. The outcome will depend on judicial interpretations of regulatory authority and the implications of previous denials.

There are a number of legal challenges related to coal mining in Alberta—both for and against policies and projects. In 2021, both provincial and federal regulators rejected the proposal for an open-pit mine, citing significant environmental concerns, particularly regarding the Oldman River watershed. Despite this setback, Rinehart has persistently sought to overturn the decision.

Rinehart through her company's subsidiary, Northback has initiated multiple lawsuits against Alberta and federal governments, challenging regulatory processes.

=== Lawsuits submitted by coal companies and their supporters ===
Northback filed its first lawsuit against the federal and Alberta governments in June 2024.

Nigel Bankes, professor emeritus of law at the University of Calgary, said that the Alberta government had created an "open season for coal development" which would possible "knock[...] the foundation out" from these lawsuits.

=== First Nations supporting GMCP ===
The Stoney Nakoda—consisting of three First Nations—and Piikani, signatories to Treaty 7, on whose land the GMCP is located, challenged the federal government's 2021 denials of the project. If the project proceeds the Stoney Nakoda and Piikani Nations would receive "project-specific economic and social benefits" from Benga through confidential impact benefit agreements they entered into with Benga.

=== Lawsuits submitted by coal mine opposition ===
There are a number of legal challenges related to Grassy Mountain. The Municipal District of Ranchland's appeal against the Alberta Energy Regulator's decision to accept Northback Holdings' applications for exploration permits. Benga Mining Limited (now Northback Holdings) and two First Nations' judicial review applications of the federal decisions rejecting the project. There was an appeal before the Alberta Court of Appeal regarding the definition of an "advanced coal project" and the Energy Minister's influence on the AER's decision.

Ongoing litigation by Benga/Northback, Piikani Nation, and Stoney Nakoda Nations seek to overturn the provincial decisions that denied approval for the project.

The Federal Court case involving three applications for judicial review of the federal government's refusal to issue environmental assessment approvals.

== Key issues ==
=== Environmental concerns ===
Coal mining in the Eastern Slopes of the Rocky Mountains poses significant threats to the water supply, impacting both water quality and quantity. Open-pit coal mining leaches toxic elements, particularly selenium, into water sources. As of 2025, there is no proven effective method exists to prevent this contamination. Concerns about water pollution include the fact that open-pit coal mining leaches toxic elements, particularly selenium, into water sources. Selenium contamination causes deformities, nerve damage, and reproductive failure in fish, mammals, and migratory birds. Coal mining operations require large amounts of water, potentially diverting it from other uses.[5]. This could lead to water shortages for farmers, ranchers, and communities, especially during drought years. The Eastern Slopes are the headwaters for major rivers that supply water to millions across Alberta, Saskatchewan, and Manitoba. Contamination could affect drinking water, food production, recreation, and ecosystems throughout the Prairies. Toxic tailings from mining pose substantial risks to long-term consequences for downstream environments. Once selenium is released into water, it is extremely difficult to mitigate its effects on water quality and aquatic ecosystem health. Tailing dam failures, though rare, can have extreme impacts on downstream water quality. Air-borne contaminants from mining activities can affect residents and communities far from mine sites.

=== Stranded assets ===
Both the 2021 Joint Review Panel and the University of Calgary Public Policy paper submitted to the Alberta Coal Policy Committee suggest that the risk of stranded assets arises from the potential for declining coal prices, the practice of extracting the best ore first, and the possibility that companies may become insolvent or unable to meet reclamation obligations. This can lead to financial liabilities being transferred to the public, particularly in the form of reclamation costs. As with orphan well where the province is struggling with billions of dollars in environmental liabilities, and the Grassy Mountain project could add to these financial burdens, which would be passed on to future generations. The JRP cited concerns of the Livingstone Landowners Group cautioned that under basic corporate law, a parent and subsidiary are different companies, and that the parent is not liable for the subsidiary's debts and obligations. In the Grassy Mountain Coal Project, for example there is risk that Northback Holdings would not take financial responsibility for stranded assets.

== Political debate ==
Blair Painter, who is mayor the municipality of Crowsnest Pass, supports the GMCP.

Landowners and ranchers in the area affected are against the project. This includes the Livingstone Landowners Group. The Canadian Parks and Wilderness Society have submitted a brief to the JPR and are considered legal action.

The Council of Canadians raised concerns that the GMCP poses significant risks to Canada's environment, Indigenous communities, and human health.

== See also ==
- Coal in Alberta
- Environmental issues in Alberta
- Grassy Mountain Coal Project

== Citations ==
A

- "AER Statement on Decision for Grassy Mountain Coal Project". AER. June 17, 2021. Archived from the original on December 13, 2024.
- "Northback Public Hearing: Transcript of AWA's Oral Presentation". Alberta Wilderness Association (AWA). Grassy Mountain Blog. December 3, 2024.
- "Stay Request of Municipal District of Ranchland No. 66" (PDF). Alberta Wilderness. Archived from the original (PDF) on November 25, 2024.
- "Grassy Mountain Blog". Alberta Wilderness Association. January 27, 2025.
- Aldrich, Josh (March 4, 2022). "Alberta reinstates 1976 coal exploration ban for eastern slopes of Rockies, advanced projects to continue through process". Calgary Herald.
- "Location and History Profile – Municipality of Crowsnest Pass" (PDF). Alberta Municipal Affairs. October 15, 2021.

B

- Bakx, Kyle (January 23, 2025). "Taxpayers protected from coal lawsuits: Alberta Premier Danielle Smith". Financial Post.
- Bankes, Nigel (October 13, 2023). "The AER Does Not Have the Jurisdiction to Consider New Coal Applications for the Grassy Mountain Coal Deposit - ABLawg".
- Nigel, Bankes (February 22, 2024). "Taking Stock of the Grassy Mountain Litigation as of February 2024". Archived from the original on March 5, 2024.
- Beeber, Al (August 8, 2025). "Province ignoring science on mining, says MLA". Lethbridge Herald.
- Brubaker, Natasha (April 27, 2021). "The effects of coal mining in Alberta would ripple throughout the Prairies". The Council of Canadians.
- Brubaker, Natasha (May 19, 2021a). "Why stopping Grassy Mountain is so pivotal to moving Canada beyond coal". The Council of Canadians.

C

  - "Alberta Rocky Mountains Coal Mine Application Goes to Public Hearing". Canadian Press. February 23, 2024 – via Calgary Herald.
- "Alberta energy regulator accepts Rocky Mountain coal mine application, public hearing planned". Canadian Press via Calgary Herald. February 26, 2024b.
- "Chemicals from old coal mines in Crowsnest Pass 'poisoning' fish". Canadian Press. June 6, 2025 – via Lethbridge News Now.
- Cherkawsky, Marika; Dingman, Alex (February 15, 2024). "Grassy Mountain Chronicles: Legitimate Expectations and Consultation Take the Spotlight". Archived from the original on April 12, 2024.
- Climenhaga, David (January 21, 2025). "Dig, baby, dig! Energy Minister Brian Jean lifts ban on coal exploration on the Eastern Slopes of the Rockies". Alberta Politics.
- Cooke, Colin A.; Graydon, Jennifer A.; Luek, Andreas; Lu, Xiufen; Yu, Hailey; Le, X. Chris; Reichert, Megan (2026). "Fish Remain High in Selenium Long after Mountaintop Coal Mines Close". Environmental Science & Technology. 60 (16): 11938–11944. Bibcode:2026EnST...6011938C. bioRxiv 10.1101/2025.05.22.655156. doi:10.1021/acs.est.5c10900. PMC 13130968. PMID 41980274.
- Cooke, Colin A.; Emmerton, Craig A.; Donahue, William F.; Kerr, Jason G. (2025). "Downstream water quality impacts persist despite mountaintop coal mine reclamation in the Canadian Rocky Mountains". Environmental Pollution. 383 126841. Elsevier BV. Bibcode:2025EPoll.38326841C. doi:10.1016/j.envpol.2025.126841. ISSN 0269-7491. PMID 40675246.
- "An updated and abbreviated timeline on Coal in Alberta". CPAWS Northern Alberta Chapter. March 21, 2023.
- "Grassy Mountain is not an exempt project". Canadian Parks and Wilderness Society Southern Alberta Chapter. June 14, 2021.
- "Denied: All requests for permission to appeal the rejection of the Grassy Mountain Coal Project". Alberta Wilderness Association. July 25, 2021a.
- "Unearthing the impacts of coal exploration in Alberta". CPAWS. June 15, 2022.
- Unearthing the impacts of coal exploration in Alberta. CPAWS via YouTube. June 15, 2022a.
- "Coal Mining in Alberta". CPAWS. May 9, 2023.
- "Updated Timeline on Coal in Alberta". CPAWS. March 21, 2023a.
- "Moratorium On Coal in Alberta Removed, Quietly Announced in the Middle of Grassy Mountain Mine Hearings". CPAWS. January 20, 2025.
- "Moratorium on Coal in Alberta Quietly Removed". January 20, 2025a. Archived from the original on January 21, 2025.
- Cook, Diane L.M. (July 15, 2024). "Benefits of the Grassy Mountain Coal Project in Alberta". Canadian Mining Journal.
- "Municipality of Crowsnest Pass: Report on the Corporate Review". George B. Cuff & Associates Ltd. October 2009. Archived from the original on October 23, 2021.

D

- Dryden, Joel (November 25, 2024). "Crowsnest Pass residents vote in favour of Grassy Mountain coal project". CBC News.
- Dryden, Joel (January 18, 2025). "Coal company pushing for compensation from Alberta as court date approaches". CBC News.
- Dryden, Joel (January 20, 2025). "Alberta government lifts ban on coal exploration in Eastern Slopes". CBC News.
- Dryden, Joel (January 22, 2025b). "Member of Alberta coal mining committee feeling 'disgust and dismay' over new plan". CBC News.

F

- Farrell, Jack; Johnson, Lisa (January 21, 2025). "Alberta government lifts coal mining moratorium, critics concerned it's 'open season'". The Canadian Press – via Global News.
- Farrell, Jack (January 21, 2025). "Smith says Alberta taxpayers need to be protected from coal lawsuits as moratorium lifted". The Canadian Press (CP) via Global News. Edmonton, Alberta.
- "Alberta First Nations Court Challenge Provides a Lifeline for Grassy Mountain Project". Fasken. March 21, 2024.
- Fawcett, Max (February 3, 2021). "Jason Kenney's embrace of open-pit coal mining has united Albertans against him | Canada's National Observer: Climate News".
- Fletcher, Robson; Anderson, Drew; Omstead, Jordan (July 7, 2020). "Bringing coal back: Alberta's new bet on an old fuel".
- Fletcher, Robson (November 7, 2023). "Coal projects in Alberta: Montem, Brian Jean, Evolve, Cabin Ridge, Atrum, and Elan". CBC News.
- Fletcher, Robson (May 30, 2023a). "Coal mining in Alberta: What you need to know about Nigel Bankes, Montem, Cabin Ridge, Elan, and more". CBC News.

G

- Gervais, Brittany (April 7, 2021). "How coal mining could impact St. Albert's drinking water". St. Albert Gazette.
- "Alberta Energy Regulator approves Grassy Mountain coal exploration". Global News. May 17, 2025.
- Graveland, Bill (November 25, 2024). "Crowsnest Pass residents vote today on contentious new coal mine". Canada's National Observer.
- Gridneff, Ilya; Smyth, Jamie (April 4, 2025). "Australia's richest woman wins vote for controversial Canadian coal m…". Financial Times.

I

- "The Government of Canada releases its final decision on the Grassy Mountain Coal Project". Impact Assessment Agency of Canada. August 6, 2021.

J

- Jamasmie, Cecilia (November 27, 2024). "Gina Rinehart closer to opening contested coal mine in Canada". MINING.COM.
- Johnson, Lisa (December 20, 2024). "Alberta announces new coal mining policy, but environmentalists are not happy". Canada's National Observer.
- Benga Mining Limited Grassy Mountain Coal Project, Crowsnest Pass (PDF). Joint Review Panel (Report). June 17, 2021. p. 680. Archived from the original (PDF) on October 2, 2021.

L

- "Conserving Our Special Places". Livingston Landowners.

M

- MacGillivray, Ken; Prentice, Jordan (January 16, 2025). "Future of Grassy Mountain Coal Mine Rests with Alberta Energy Regulator". Global News. Archived from the original on January 17, 2025.
- Maclean, Rachel (July 21, 2021). "Federal government accepts decision to reject Grassy Mountain coal mine project". CBC News.
- Martin, Kevin (July 7, 2022). "Company launches $3.4-billion lawsuit against province over coal mining ban". Calgary Herald. Calgary, Alberta.
- Martin, Kevin (September 21, 2022a). "Australian coal company files nearly $4B lawsuit over Alberta's ban on new exploration". Calgary Herald.
- McKay, Brett (2025). "What Are Alberta's Contractual Obligations to Coal Companies?". Archived from the original on January 9, 2025.
- "Five coal companies sue province of Alberta for $8 billion". Mining. December 14, 2023.
- "Alberta lifts ban on new coal exploration and development". Mining Technology. January 22, 2025.
- "Ministerial Order 2/2022". Open Alberta. March 2, 2022.

N

- "Coal companies sue Alberta over policy changes". North American Mining Magazine (NAMM). December 19, 2023.
- Niehaus, Rafi (September 20, 2023). "Alberta regulators approve drilling program at Grassy Mountain coal site". CBC News. Archived from the original on September 20, 2023.
- Nikiforuk, Andrew (January 28, 2022). "Alberta Court to Australian Coal Baron: You Lose". The Tyee.
- Nikiforuk, Andrew (September 27, 2023). "In Alberta, Intense Lobbying by Australia's Coal Baron". The Tyee.
- Nikiforuk, Andrew (September 17, 2024). "Alberta's Highest Court Jams Smith's Coal Plans". The Tyee – via Resilience.
- Nikiforuk, Andrew (October 1, 2024a). "Alberta Coal Fight Heats Up". The Tyee. Archived from the original on October 1, 2024.
- Nikiforuk, Andrew (January 1, 2025). "The Billionaire Who Bored a Hole in Alberta's Laws". The Tyee.
- Niven, Michael B.; Custer, Michael (September 25, 2024). "Recent Grassy Mountain Decision Affirms the Rule of Law". Archived from the original on October 7, 2024.
- "Northback Holdings". Northback. 2024. Archived from the original on August 13, 2024.
- "Northback Launches Yes for Grassy Mountain Campaign in Crowsnest Pass". Northback. Crowsnest Pass, Alberta. October 21, 2024. Archived from the original on February 15, 2025.

R

- Ranger, Michael (December 20, 2024). "Alberta announces new coal mining policy plan, industry consults". CityNews Edmonton.
- Rieger, Sarah (January 22, 2025). "Alberta lifts ban on coal exploration in Eastern Slopes, Rocky Mountains". CBC News.
- Grassy Mountain Coal Project (PDF) (Report). Archived from the original (PDF) on December 12, 2019.

S

- Seskus, Tony; Fletcher, Robson (October 27, 2020). "Historic Alberta coal community wrestles with plans for new mining". CBC News.
- Secord, Richard (June 23, 2021). "Grassy Mountain Coal Project". Ackroyd LLP.
- Savard, Scott; O'Nyons, Harrison (November 29, 2024). "High River Mayor points to "deplorable lack of public consultation," for Grassy Mountain coal project". OkotoksOnline.
- Smith, Chris (February 15, 2024). "Exploration drilling program underway". Northback. Archived from the original on February 15, 2024.
- Sobolewski, André (January 1, 2006). Evaluation of Treatment Options to Reduce Water-Borne Selenium at Coal Mines in West-Central Alberta (Report). p. 45.
- Stephenson, Amanda (June 27, 2023). "Australian coal company files nearly $4B lawsuit over Alberta's ban on new exploration". Calgary Herald.

T

- Truscott, Caley Ramsay (September 20, 2023). "Alberta coal project moves ahead with drilling permit despite opposition". Global News. Archived from the original on September 20, 2023.
- U
- "1976 Coal Policy". Public Interest Law Clinic, Faculty of Law, University of Calgary.

V

- van Tighem, Kevin (July 1, 2019). "The Plans to Strip-Mine Coal in the Mountains". Alberta Views.

W

- Weber, Bob (February 23, 2024). "Alberta's Energy Regulator to Hold Public Hearing for New Coal Mine Application".
- Weber, Bob (August 22, 2024). "Top Alberta Court Allows Appeal of Coal Miner Exploration Applications". The Canadian Press.
- Weber, Bob (August 23, 2024a). "Alberta Court of Appeal Allows Appeal in Coal Exploration Case".
- Whelan, Piper (July 28, 2020). "Ranchers fear loss of grazing lands due to coal mining projects". Canadian Cattlemen.
- "Report reveals Elk Valley's $6.4 billion water pollution problem". Wildsight. March 19, 2024.
- Wilson, Jim (January 15, 2025). "Hearing on Grassy Mountain Coal Project Resumes in Calgary". Canadian Occupational Safety. Archived from the original on January 17, 2025.
- Winter, Jennifer; Bailey, Megan; Galley, Emily; Joseph, Chris; Shaffer, Blake (November 1, 2021). A Multiple Account Benefit-Cost Analysis of Coal Mining in Alberta (Report). Rochester, NY: Social Science Research Network. doi:10.2139/ssrn.4046111. SSRN 4046111.

Z

- Ziaee, Donya (June 18, 2021). "Huge win against Big Coal: The Grassy Mountain project has been rejected!". The Council of Canadians.
