= Plateau Mountain =

Plateau Mountain may refer to:

- Plateau Mountain (Alberta), in the Livingstone Range, Canada
- Plateau Mountain (New York), United States
