= Peter Wright (mining entrepreneur) =

Australian businessperson (1908–1985)

- Born: Ernest Archibald Maynard Wright; 24 February 1908; Kalgoorlie, Western Australia
- Died: 13 September 1985 (aged 77); Bangkok, Thailand
- Occupations: Accountant; geologist; entrepreneur
- Known for: Wright Prospecting
- Spouse: Pauline McClemans (m. 1932–1985)
- Children: Angela Bennett; Michael Wright (1937–2012); Julian Wright

Ernest Archibald Maynard "Peter" Wright (24 February 1908 – 13 September 1985) was an Australian mining entrepreneur. He was best known as the business partner of Lang Hancock. After his death, his estate became worth over A$1 billion.

== Early life and education ==
Wright was born in Kalgoorlie to parents who were originally from Victoria. The family moved to Perth at a young age and Wright was educated at several schools, including Hale School. He left school before graduating.

In 1932 he married Pauline McClemans, daughter of William McClemans, an Anglican clergyman who founded Christ Church Grammar School.

== Business career ==
After leaving school, he joined the Bank of New South Wales. In 1930 he qualified as an accountant and set up his own accountancy firm. In 1938 he became general manager of his father's firm F. W. Wright & Co, later becoming managing director when it became Wright Ltd in 1949.

During the late 1930s, Wright joined with Lang Hancock, a former schoolmate, in a mining venture in the north-west of Western Australia, beginning a partnership that lasted for several decades, named Hanwright. One of the partnership's early ventures was an asbestos mine at Wittenoom, Western Australia. Hanwright and Rio Tinto reached agreement in the 1960s, where Hanwright secured 2.5 percent share in all iron ore sold from its Pilbara discoveries. In 2023, Wright's descendants commenced civil legal action in the WA Supreme Court on behalf of Wright Prospecting against Hancock Prospecting. Wright Prospecting claimed that the agreement between Hancock and Wright included a division of certain Hanwright assets, assigning some to Wright Prospecting and others to Hancock Prospecting. Wright Prospecting sought its half of the partnership's 2.5 percent in royalties — or 1.25 percent of all profits made, likely to be worth several hundred million dollars. Wright Prospecting also argued that Hope Downs 4, 5 and 6 was a shared Hanwright asset — worth billions of dollars.

In 1969 Wright and Hancock commenced publication in Perth of a weekly newspaper The Sunday Independent principally to help further their mining interests. Hancock largely relinquishing his interest in it in the early 70s but Wright continued publishing it until selling it to owners of The Truth in 1984.

== Death and legacy ==
Wright died in 1985 in Bangkok, Thailand while travelling home to Perth from Europe. He was cremated at Karrakatta Cemetery.

Prior to his death, in 1985 the Business Review Weekly (BRW) estimated his net worth at A$50 million. By 2013, the magazine valued his family's net worth at A$1.53 billion. The rise in the value was largely a result of royalty agreements signed by Hancock and Wright during the 1960s. The agreements entitled Hancock and Wright 2.5 percent of revenue generated by Rio Tinto's Hamersley Iron mines. As of May 2023, Wright's daughter, Angela Bennett, had a net worth of A$4.63 billion and his granddaughters, Alexandra Burt and Leonie Baldock, had an assessed net worth of A$3.85 billion.
