= Grassy Mountain =

Grassy Mountain may refer to:

- Grassy Mountain (Georgia), a mountain in Murray County, Georgia
- Grassy Mountain Coal Project, a former proposed coal mine near Crowsnest Pass, Alberta
