= William Porteous =

Australian land developer

William Porteous is a Canadian-born Australian land developer and real estate agent.

== Biography ==
Born in Ottawa, Canada, Porteous was raised and educated in Halifax, Nova Scotia. He attended Simon Fraser University in British Columbia where he attained a Bachelor of Arts degree in Resource Management and Town Planning. He worked for a short time as a trainee stock broker trader before coming to Australia in September 1970, when he was employed by the Bond Corporation from 1971 to 1979 as their project manager for various large Bond Corporation ventures.

Porteous undertook several substantial property development projects of his own in Western Australia. In 1979 he accepted Acton Consolidated's offer to join their organization. He was appointed a director and partner of the Acton Group in 1983. In 2008, he embarked on his own and created William Porteous Properties International. Porteous specialises in prestige properties and developments. He is best known for his success in the top price range luxury properties and developments, especially in the Western suburbs, and as an auctioneer. In December 2009, he sold a property in Mosman Park for A$57.5 million, setting a record for the most expensive house ever sold in Australia.

On 25 June 1992, he married Perth socialite Rose Hancock whose former husband (deceased a few months earlier) was Lang Hancock, the iron ore magnate, William's friend.
