= John Hancock (Australian businessman) =

Australian businessman (born 1976)

- Born: John Langley Hayward; 2 January 1976 (age 50)
- Citizenship: Australian
- Education: Phillips Academy
- Occupation: Businessman
- Children: 3
- Mother: Gina Rinehart
- Relatives: Lang Hancock (grandfather)

John Hancock (born John Langley Hayward; 2 January 1976) is an Australian businessman. He is the son of Gina Rinehart and grandson of the late mining magnate Lang Hancock.

== Early life ==
The son of English-born Greg Milton and Australian Gina Rinehart, John Hancock was born John Langley Hayward. His younger sister is Bianca Rinehart and his two half-sisters are Ginia Rinehart and Hope Welker.

Milton subsequently changed his name to Greg Hayward. John then changed his surname to Hancock, a tribute to his grandfather after a dispute with his mother. Hancock was educated at the Phillips Academy in Andover, Massachusetts in the United States.

== Hope Margaret Hancock Trust ==
In 2010, Hancock and his sister, Bianca Rinehart, and half-sister, Hope Welker, launched action in the Supreme Court of New South Wales against their mother in relation to the operation of a family trust fund established by their late grandfather. Hancock was quoted as responding to a question about living off the family trust fund:

"Well it'd be nice if I was, but I have all the bad things about having money and none of the good things."

Despite his difference with his mother, he still loves her very much and has indicated they agree 90 percent of the time. It is the ten percent which causes the difficulties.

The NSW Supreme Court handed down its decision by appointing Bianca Rinehart as trustee of the Hope Margaret Hancock Trust. Their mother already agreed to step aside as trustee and wanted consultation on who should replace her.

=== Net worth ===
Hancock appeared on the Financial Review Rich List for the first time in 2020 with a net worth assessed at A$2.05 billion. Hancock appeared on the Forbes list of Australia's 50 richest people for the first time in 2017, with a net worth of US$5.00 billion, held jointly with his sister, Bianca Rinehart, and half-sisters, Ginia Rinehart and Hope Welker.

Year	Financial Review Rich List		Forbes Australia's 50 Richest	
Year	Rank	Net worth (A$)	Rank	Net worth (US$)
2017^{[note 1]}	−	not listed	5 ▲	$5.00 billion ▲
2018	−	not listed		
2019^{[note 1]}	−	not listed	11 ▼	$3.10 billion ▼
2020	40 ▲	$2.05 billion ▲		
2021	44 ▼	$2.40 billion ▲		
2022	45 ▼	$2.43 billion ▲		
2023	47 ▼	$2.44 billion ▲		
2024	50 ▼	$2.67 billion ▲		
2025	57 ▼	$2.69 billion ▲		

Legend
Icon	Description
Steady	Has not changed from the previous year
▲	Has increased from the previous year
▼	Has decreased from the previous year

== Notes ==
- ^[Note 1]: Forbes listed jointly with his sister, Bianca Rinehart, and half-sisters, Ginia Rinehart and Hope Welker.
