= Rose Porteous =

Filipino-born Australian socialite (born 1948)

- Born: Rosario Magdalena Teresita Lacson; 26 October 1948 (age 78); Bacolod, Negros Occidental, Philippines
- Other names: Rose Teodoro, Rose Kuan, Rose Hancock
- Occupations: Hairdresser; Flight attendant; Model; Maid; Businesswoman; Real estate agent; Socialite; Beauty consultant
- Years active: 1971–present
- Spouses: Julian Teodoro (m. 1971; div. 1980) Patrick Kuan (m. 1983; div. 1985) Lang Hancock (m. 1985; died 1992) William Porteous (m. 1992; div. 2012)
- Relatives: Aniceto Lacson (paternal grandfather); Arsenio Lacson (maternal uncle, paternal cousin once removed)

Rose Porteous (born Rosario Magdalena Teresita Lacson on 26 October 1948) is a Filipino-born Australian socialite, best known for her marriage to Western Australia iron ore mining magnate Lang Hancock, and the protracted legal battle with his daughter, Gina Rinehart, over the circumstances that led to his death, and the distribution of his estate. The action, commenced by Rinehart in 1992, was eventually settled in 2003 following a coronial inquiry that determined Hancock died of natural causes. Porteous lives in Perth and Melbourne.

== Biography ==
Born in Bacolod, Negros Occidental, Philippines, Porteous is the daughter of Nicolas Lacson and Amparo Lacson. Her grandfather, Gen. Aniceto Lacson, was a distinguished sugar baron who was also prominent military figure in Negros Occidental during the Philippine Revolution while her uncle, Arsenio Lacson, was the first elected mayor of Manila. Her brother, Salvador L. Lacson, is the chairman of Lacson and Lacson Insurance Brokers Inc., a leading firm since 1973.

After spending time in Hong Kong, Spain, Singapore and Malaysia, Porteous arrived in Australia in 1983 on a three-month working visa. Porteous began working as a maid for the newly widowed Hancock.

=== Marriage to Hancock ===
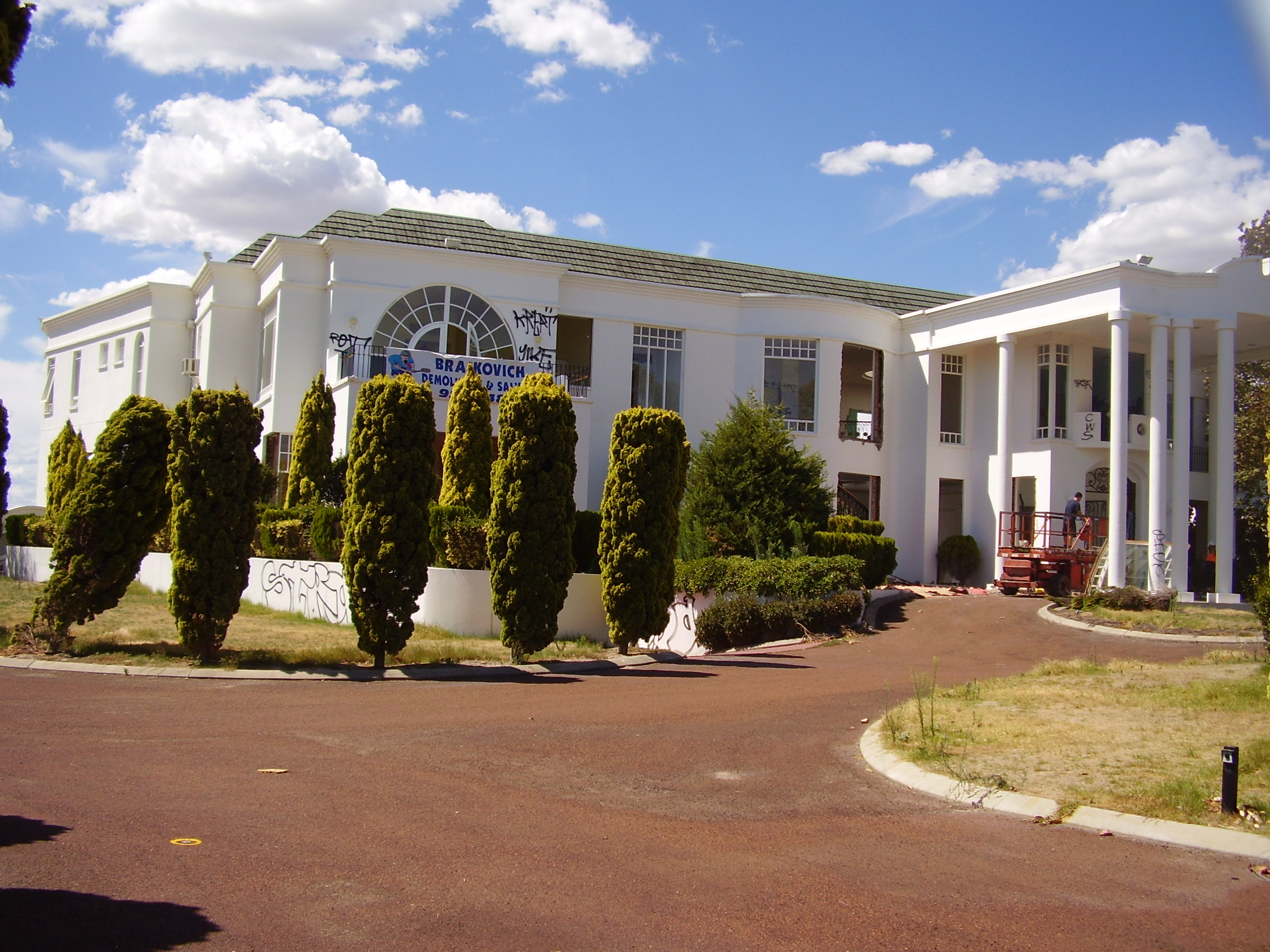
Prix d'Amour, during its demolition in early 2006.

Hancock and Porteous became involved over the course of Porteous' employment and they were wed on 6 July 1985, in Sydney. Porteous, who was thirty-nine years younger than her husband, was often accused of gold digging because of their age disparity. As Porteous later stated: "I have been accused of sleeping with every man in Australia ... I would have been a very busy woman." Gina Rinehart, who stood to inherit his entire estate, did not attend the wedding.

Although the marriage would later prove tumultuous, early on Hancock was clearly infatuated with his young wife. He gave her money and investments in real estate in the Sydney area. Porteous, in turn, helped Hancock to look and act like a much younger man, belying his eight decades. As The Age put it, "Rose made Lang feel younger, sprucing up his wardrobe, dying his hair and getting rid of his cane". Together they built the "Prix d'Amour", a lavish 16-block mansion overlooking the Swan River. The mansion, which was modelled after Tara, the plantation mansion in the movie Gone with the Wind, was the setting for many large parties at which Hancock and Porteous would "dance into the night".

As the marriage wore on, however, the relationship between Hancock and Porteous began to break down. Rumours surfaced of her having disputes with servants and others close to Hancock, especially Rinehart, and as Hancock's health worsened, so did his relationship with Porteous. Rinehart would later claim that Hancock's bride had paid little attention to his worsening health, but had instead "screeched at him for money". Although there were many quarrels, Hancock and Porteous remained married until his death in 1992.

=== Legal action relating to the death of Hancock ===
Porteous rose to prominence in the 1990s as the central figure in a series of lawsuits launched by her step-daughter, Gina Rinehart. Rinehart is the daughter of Lang Hancock and Hope Margaret Nicholas, Hancock's second wife. On 25 June 1992, less than three months after Hancock's death, Porteous married for the fourth time, to Hancock's long-time friend William Porteous. Rinehart was indignant at the haste with which her stepmother had remarried.

Central to Rinehart's lawsuits were the accusations that Porteous married Hancock only for his fortune and alleged that her stepmother's actions had contributed to her father's death. According to his daughter, the death was "unexpected" and came "despite strong will to live". An autopsy showed that he had died of arteriosclerotic heart disease and police investigation revealed no evidence to contradict that. However, Hancock's daughter insisted that her stepmother had unnaturally hastened his death. Two successive state coroners refused to allow an inquest, but one was eventually granted in 1999 under the direction of WA Attorney-General, Peter Foss.

After preliminary hearings during 2000, the inquest began in April 2001 with an initial estimate of 63 witnesses to be called over five weeks. The inquest was dominated by claims that Porteous had literally nagged Hancock to death with shrill tantrums and arguments. Porteous denied the allegations, famously explaining: "For anyone else it would be a tantrum, for me it's just raising my voice." In the last few days of Hancock's life, Porteous had attempted to pressure him into changing his will and Hancock eventually took out a restraining order against her. The inquest was put on hold after allegations that Rinehart had paid witnesses to appear and that some had lied in their testimony. It resumed three months later with a smaller witness list and ended with the finding that Hancock had died of natural causes and not as a result of Porteous' behaviour.

With a legal bill of A$2.7m, Rose and William Porteous commenced action against Rinehart, that was eventually settled out of court in 2003. A few months later, Porteous was revealed as one of several Australian celebrities promoting the SPC Ardmona brand of canned chopped tomatoes with the slogan, Rich and Thick. A short-lived one-off reality TV show titled Rose followed in November 2002. During 2005 it was reported that Porteous was being sued in excess of A$14 million by Melbourne-based law firm Slater & Gordon in unpaid legal fees. It was reported that the unpaid fees came from court cases and legal actions in which Slater and Gordon represented Porteous, including the 2001 inquiry into the death of Hancock, and the long-running court battle with Rinehart, over his A$400 million-plus estate. It was reported that Porteous defaulted on two monthly payments to the legal firm of A$25,000 each. The dispute was lodged in the Victorian Supreme Court and Porteous unsuccessfully sought to have the matter heard in Western Australia, also claiming that she signed legal agreements in 2005, under duress. The matter was settled in November, with Porteous agreeing to pay the law firm A$13.25 million by 31 December 2005.

=== Wealth ===
The wealth of Porteous is unknown. In 2007 it was reported that she sold two adjoining penthouses in Toorak, Melbourne over six months for an estimated A$9 million, a profit of A$4 million. In March 2006, Porteous commissioned the demolition of her Perth mansion "Prix d'Amour", built with Hancock in 1990 for an estimated cost of A$7 million. The 17-room landmark mansion featured French doors and windows, parquetry and marble floors and wrought iron. The estate, set on 8,100 m^{2} (87,000 sq ft) featured the main house, two guest houses, a tennis court and two swimming pools. The property was then subdivided into ten approximately 800 m^{2} (8,600 sq ft) lots (each with maximised views) which were put on the market for around A$5 million. In 2008–2009, two of these blocks were resold for a profit of A$1.5 million.
