= Grassy Mountain Coal Project =

Open-pit coal mine near Crowsnest Pass, Alberta, Canada

The Grassy Mountain Coal Project was a proposed open-pit mine to produce metallurgical coal, initially submitted to the Alberta Energy Regulator by the Australian-based Benga Mining in 2015. The proposed mine was located on a previously abandoned mine site near Crowsnest Pass, Alberta, Canada in the eastern slopes of the Rocky Mountains. In their June 17, 2021 final report, the joint provincial-federal review panel composed of the Alberta Energy Regulator (AER) and the Minister of Environment and Climate Change Canada (ECCC) denied Benga Mining's application for the Grassy Mountain Coal Project because of significant adverse environmental effects.

The project was a flashpoint for widespread public outcry against the 2020 opening of previously protected areas in the eastern slopes of the Rocky Mountains to coal mining. The United Conservative Party (UCP)'s then environment minister, Sonya Savage responded to negative responses expressed by the public by reinstating the 1976 protections, and by establishing Alberta's Coal Policy Committee in 2021 to make recommendations on the management of the province's coal resources.

As of 2025, The Grassy Mountain Coal Project continues to be a contentious issue. In December 2024, the Alberta government announced plans to ban new mountaintop removal and open-pit coal developments on the eastern slopes of the Rocky Mountains. However, these new rules do not apply to Grassy Mountain.

== Background ==
Alberta has a long history of coal mining, stretching back to the mid 1870s, and mining was vital to Crowsnest Pass throughout the 20th century. The last mine in the area closed in 1983.

The Coal Development Policy for Alberta, enacted in 1976 by then-Alberta premier Peter Lougheed, included a land use classification system that limited coal development thereby protected some of the Rocky Mountains' eastern slopes from coal mining.

In 2013, Benga Mining acquired the Grassy Mountain property and coal leases from Devon Canada and Consol of Canada who had a 50/50 joint venture. In November 2015, Benga submitted an environmental impact assessment to the Alberta Energy Regulator and the Canadian Environmental Assessment Agency. In August 2016, an updated environmental impact assessment was lodged, and in October 2017 an integrated application was submitted to the AER.

In May 2020, then Alberta Environment Minister Jason Nixon announced that the UCP government was rescinding the 1976 Coal Policy to allow for coal exploration and development in the eastern foothills of the Rockies. To facilitate economic development, new mining proposals would be dealt with directly by the Alberta Energy Regulator, without the 1976 restrictions. From June 2020 through January 2021, with over a million hectares of land newly-opened to coal mining, applications were submitted to AER who issued new leases.

There was "intense public outcry" to this decision. A spring 2021 online survey on open-pit coal mining undertaken by the newly-established Coal Policy Committee showed that the majority of the 25,000 survey respondents had "serious concerns" about the Alberta government's plan for coal mining in environmentally sensitive areas that are also among Alberta's most popular regions. In April 2021, then minister Savage immediately halted expansions of some exploratory coal mining projects, and restored the 1976 protections, and established the Coal Policy Committee on March 29, 2021, led by Ron Wallace, to make recommendations on the management of the province's coal resources.

== Benga Mining Project proposal ==
The Grassy Mountain Coal Project was proposed as an open-pit metallurgical coal mine covering 6918 acres (28 km^{2}). It was expected to produce 4.5 million tonnes of processed coal per year, with an expected lifespan of 25 years. The proposal was put forth by Benga Mining Limited, a subsidiary of Riversdale Resources Limited, an Australian company. The steelmaking coal would have been primarily destined for export to India and China. Steve Mallyon, managing director of Riversdale Resources, stated the justification for the project was based on the expected economic benefits from foreign investment, with commitments to customers in Asia and Europe.

=== Northback Holdings project proposal ===
In late September 2023, Northback Holdings Corporation—formerly known as Benga Mining Limited, subsidiaries of Hancock Prospecting Pty owned by Gina Rinehart, an Australian mining magnate,—applied to the Alberta Energy Regulator for licenses which would allow them to operate a program including water diversion and drilling to explore for coal in Grassy Mountain, which the CBC described as the resurrection of the proposal that the AER had already rejected.

== Coal Policy Committee ==
One of the early surveys organized by the Coal Policy Committee, which was chaired by Ron Wallace, found that 25,000 "respondents had serious concerns" about the province's plans for coal mining. In response, Savage put a pause on coal exploration on Category 2 lands, bowing to the pressure of public opinion until the final report was submitted.

One of the presentations to the Wallace commission was a 175-page report by ecological consultants, the Alces Group, which had been commissioned by the Livingstone Landowners Group, composed of a number of southwestern Alberta ranchers, which focused on selenium contamination and how coal-mining negatively impacted water.

In September, Wallace said that the response from the public was robust and that "People were searching for opportunities to engage." He said that he didn't see "any way the government could ignore the message that's been brought forward here."

The Coal Policy Committee submitted its report in December 2021 which included eight recommendations.

== Public response ==
The proposed steelmaking coal mine generated widespread public condemnation on the basis of environmental and cultural concern. It gained notoriety among the public after local country music artist Corb Lund spoke out against it in beginning in January 2021. Lund continued to lead the public opposition, via social media and a protest concert featuring local landowners in June 2021. In October 2021, Lund released the song "This Is My Prairie," a collaboration with other prominent Alberta artists including Terri Clark and Brett Kissel, which detailed the importance of the natural environment of Southern Alberta and specifically criticized coal mining in the eastern slopes. In an interview with the Thomson Reuters Foundation, Lund said that opponents of coal mining in the foothills included people from rural and indigenous communities, environmentalists, as well as some workers in the oil industry.

A Leger poll conducted in 2021 determined that 77% of Albertans were concerned about the environmental impact that coal mining would have on rivers, and 58% believed that the economic benefits would not outweigh the environmental damage. In communities across Alberta, numerous lawn signs decrying coal mining and supporting the protection of clean water were placed in the yards of Alberta residents. Eight Alberta municipalities formally expressed concerns about coal mining in the eastern slopes, including Lethbridge, Turner Valley, High Level, Okotoks, and Canmore.

== First Nations ==
Local First Nations, including Siksika and Kainai Nation, expressed opposition to coal mining in the Rocky Mountains and launched a legal challenge against the revocation of the 1976 coal policy. They cited the importance of Crowsnest Mountain as a sacred cultural site, and the danger to species such as grizzly bears, big horn sheep, bull trout, and elk, as well as the watersheds of the Oldman and Livingstone Rivers.

However, they did not specifically oppose the Grassy Mountain Coal Project. Siksika Nation was willing to support this project on the basis of meaningful consultation, but opposed any future coal mining applications. A nearby coal project at Tent Mountain resulted in the decline of positive relations between another coal company, Montem Resources, and the Kainai and Siksika First Nations. In letters filed with the Impact Assessment Agency of Canada, Kainai and Siksika stated Montem's consultations to be transactional and not meaningful.

== Joint provincial-federal review of Benga Mining application ==
In August 2018, the minister for environment and climate change and the chief executive officer of the Alberta Energy Regulator announced an agreement to establish a joint review panel for the project, which enabled the Alberta Energy Regulator and the Impact Assessment Agency of Canada to jointly review the project proposal. The joint review panel published its report in June 2021.

In their June 17, 2021 final 680-page report, the joint review panel established in 2018 by the Alberta Energy Regulator (AER) and the Minister of Environment and Climate Change Canada(ECCC) said that the Benga Mining Limited, Grassy Mountain Coal Project was not in the public's best interest due to its environmental impact.

On August 6, 2021, the project was rejected by Minister of the Environment Jonathan Wilkinson, who had concluded that the project was likely to "cause significant adverse environmental effects" based on the federal environmental assessment, as well as the AER and ECCC joint review panel's report, and other sources. The assessment cited concerns for surface water quality, the impacts on key species such as the westslope cutthroat trout, the whitebark pine, and the little brown bat, and the loss of lands used for traditional activities by the Kainai, Piikani, and Siksika First Nations. Similar coal projects nearby in British Columbia were found to have resulted in excessive fish deaths due to increased selenium in the water supply, resulting in a $1.4 million fine for Teck Resources.

Shortly after the joint review panel decision was published, hundreds of residents from the Crowsnest Pass area, who supported coal mining in the eastern foothills of the Rockies, gathered to express their disappointment.

== Ongoing contention ==
According to Alberta law, the costs of expert testimony, legal advice, and research incurred by citizens appearing before regulators are supposed to be paid by the project proponents. On 23 December 2021, the Alberta Energy Regulator issued a costs order totalling $868,874.31.

The Eastern Slopes Protection Act was introduced in the Alberta Legislature by Rachel Notley, leader of the official opposition party, in April 2021. As of February 2022, the Act has not yet passed.

== See also ==
- Alberta coal policy controversy
