= Sentinel Peak (Alberta) =

Mountain in Alberta, Canada

- Location within Alberta

Highest point
- Elevation: 2,373 m (7,785 ft)
- Prominence: 255 m (837 ft)
- Listing: Mountains of Alberta
- Coordinates: 50°15′15″N 114°28′48″W

Geography
- Country: Canada
- Province: Alberta
- Parent range: Livingstone Range
- Topo map: NTS 82J8 Stimson Creek

Climbing
- Easiest route: Hike

Sentinel Peak (also known as Sentinel Mountain) is a mountain in Kananaskis, Alberta, Canada. It is located in the Livingstone Range, east of Sentinel Pass. The headwaters of Pekisko Creek originate on the slopes of the mountain.

The mountain was named in 1884 by George M. Dawson although he referred to it as Sentinel Mountain on his 1886 map.
