= Sunday Independent (Western Australia) =

Perth, Western Australian based weekly newspaper

The Sunday Independent
- Type: Weekly newspaper
- Format: Tabloid
- Owner(s): Lang Hancock, Peter Wright
- Founded: April 1969
- Ceased publication: May 1986
- Headquarters: East Victoria Park, Western Australia
- Circulation: 70,000 (peak)

The Sunday Independent (also known as The Independent) was a Western Australian weekly newspaper owned by mining entrepreneurs Lang Hancock and Peter Wright, printed and published in the Perth suburb of East Victoria Park.

The paper was launched on 27 April 1969 as a Sunday-only publication, under the banner The Independent. Its founding editor was Maxwell Newton (who was previously the foundation editor of The Australian). On 3 January 1971 it was renamed The Sunday Independent.

Circulation was claimed to be 80,000 copies at its peak, however it never seriously challenged that of its rival, the well established The Sunday Times.

In 1973 it ran as a daily for four weeks, as The Independent Sun, in direct competition with The West Australian. It appeared from 10 October 1973 to 8 November 1973.

By 1979 the Sunday Independent became one of the first Australian newspapers to integrate its composing, editorial and classified advertising production via computer, using software developed in-house.

Hancock largely relinquished his interest in the paper in the early 1970s and in 1984 Wright sold his interest to Owen Thomson and Mark Day, owners of The Truth. Thomson became its editor-in-chief, his son Hamish was the paper's chief reporter. Later that year Thomson and Day sold it to News Limited, who also owned The Sunday Times, who moved it into the Sunday Times building in Perth and it was wound up on 24 May 1986. Stephen Fox was its last editor.

The Sunday Independent and The Independent Sun formed part of The Independent Group of Newspapers, which also included The Mandurah Advertiser, The Pilbara Advertiser, The Sound Advertiser and the short lived The Satellite Advertiser (which ran from 24 Aug. 1972-5 Oct. 1972).
