= Plateau Mountain (Alberta) =

Protected area in Kananaskis Country, Alberta, Canada

Coordinates: 50.2°N 114.5°W

Plateau Mountain is a protected area, known as an ecological reserve, that was established in 1991 in southern Kananaskis Country southwest of Calgary, Alberta, Canada. The mountain is situated within the Livingstone Range of the Rocky Mountains. The area is significant because its landscape is very similar to the Arctic and includes unusual alpine and subalpine landforms, rare plant communities and species as well as important wildlife habitat.

Plateau Mountain is one of fifteen ecological reserves in the province that are meant to protect examples of ecosystems for the purposes of research, education, heritage appreciation, recreation and tourism. The area is administered by the Wilderness Areas, Ecological Reserves, Natural Areas and Heritage Rangelands Act and management is directed by a management plan.

Unlike most other areas in Kananaskis Country, Plateau Mountain Ecological Reserve is flat with unique features that include patterned ground formed by permafrost. And unlike other areas in Kananaskis, the reserve has never been glaciated (a nunatak). Other features that make the area unique include rare insects and plants. The mountain is noted for its ice cave, which contains unique ice features. Entry is blocked by a gate and is restricted to approved researchers.

Since the area is sensitive, no facilities are provided. Hunting, trapping, camping and fires are prohibited, and access is by foot only.
