= Voyager Estate =

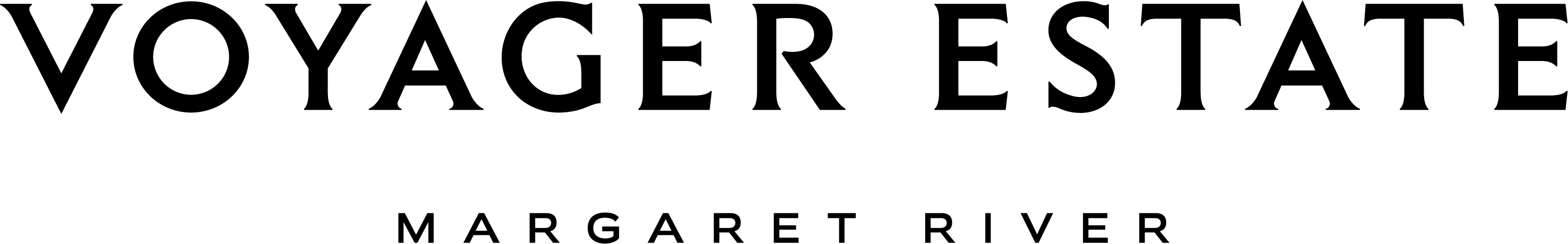
- Location: Lot 1, Stevens Road, Margaret River WA 6285, Australia
- Coordinates: 33°59′49″S 115°03′15″E
- Wine region: Margaret River
- Founded: 1978
- Key people: Steve James, manager winemaking and viticulture; Travis Lemm, winemaker and winery manager; Glen Ryan, vineyard manager
- Known for: Voyager Estate Chardonnay
- Varietals: Chardonnay, Cabernet Sauvignon, Chenin blanc, Merlot, Sauvignon blanc, Semillon, Shiraz
- Other products: Gallery; Restaurant
- Distribution: International
- Tasting: Open to public
- Website: Voyager Estate

Voyager Estate is an Australian winery located in the Margaret River wine region of Western Australia. James Halliday gives the winery his highest ranking, five red stars, in his "Halliday Australian Wine Companion". According to Ray Jordan, wine writer for The West Australian, the winery produces excellent wines.

== Location ==
The Voyager Estate property lies in the cool meso-climate of Stevens Valley within the greater Wallcliffe sub-region of the Margaret River. This wine region is virtually unique in Australia in that it is surrounded on three sides by the Indian Ocean. The vines benefit from the maritime climate. The land is part of the Leeuwin's Naturaliste Ridge, rising from ancient granite land mass 2,000 million years old, among the world's oldest soils.

The Margaret River region has a low mean annual temperature range and in terms of rainfall, a Mediterranean climate with a low annual rainfall between October and April. In a dry vintage it is very similar in climate to Pomerol and Saint Èmilion in Bordeaux. This location, long regarded as key growing area for the finest Margaret River Chardonnay has also developed a reputation for producing elegant Cabernet Sauvignon and other Bordeaux varieties.

== Estate and facilities ==
Both Leeuwin Estate and Xanadu Wines are located nearby; along with Voyager, they are considered the region's most acclaimed wineries and form the nucleus of the ‘Golden Triangle of Chardonnay’.

Voyager Estate's Cape Dutch-style tasting room and rose garden are major tourist attractions, and the winery is also known for its restaurant, named the best Regional Restaurant of the Year for 2018 by the WA Good Food Guide Awards. In the same competition, the same group named Head Chef Santiago (Santi) Fernandez as Best Regional Chef, and the Voyager Estate Restaurant took third place in the publication's ranking of the Top-50 Western Australian Restaurants.

Peter Gherardi planted the initial 14ha (35 acres) of vineyards in 1978 and named his winery Freycinet Estate. He purchased 40ha (99 acres) in the Stevens Valley after having read research done by Dr. Harold Olmo and Dr. John Gladstones, both of whom believed the Margaret River region had tremendous potential to grow grapes. “There was a lot of talk around the area that we were climatically similar to Bordeaux." said Gherardi, "So I planted Cabernet Sauvignon, Merlot, a little bit of Cabernet Franc and then the Bordeaux whites, Sauvignon Blanc, Sémillon and also Chenin Blanc." These original vineyard blocks still surround the winery's cellar door, and the four additional vineyards of Voyager Estate are planted on well drained gravelly soils on adjoining properties.

The property was purchased in 1991 by Australian businessman Michael Wright, who renamed it Voyager Estate. Wright was a teetotaler who loved agriculture and the Margaret River region. His environmental consciousness was paired with a fanatical attention to detail in the vineyards. At the time of his death in 2012, the property had grown to 110ha (270 acres), all farmed following a “balanced and sustainable” form of viticulture, drawing upon organic principals and using organic composts and seaweed extracts to replace commercial fertilizer. Following Wright's passing, his daughter Alex Burt (née Wright) took over ownership of the property. She continues her father's careful, environmental approach to viticulture and winemaking, and two-thirds of its vineyards currently meet Australian Certified Organic standards, with the final third to be certified in 2019.

== Management ==
Steve James, Manager of Winemaking and Viticulture, began working for Voyager Estate as a viticulturalist and has been instrumental in the property's conversion to organic farming. His interest in all aspects of wine production carries over to the entire team, with winemakers and viticulturists working together over the course of the year to make sure that they are able to make best use of each vineyard and each block. Integrated pest control management is used, all pruning, leaf plucking, shoot tinning and green harvesting is done by hand, and flocks of local sheep are brought in to trim weeds.

A similar light-touch approach is utilized in the vinification. Grapes are hand-harvested and pass through a sorting table in order to ensure that only the highest-quality grapes are processed. Each block is handled separately until blending. Natural yeast is used in the white wines, and only the free-run juice is retained for the Estate Chardonnay, resulting in an elegant wine that reflects its vineyard source. Only tight-grained French oak barrels are used in the èlevage, adding finesse to the finished wine without taking over as the primary characteristic of the wine.

In addition to being widely available in Australia, Voyager Estate wines are exported to the United Kingdom, the United States, Singapore, Taiwan, Canada, Hong Kong, Malaysia, Indonesia, Japan, Kenya, Denmark, China and Germany.

== See also ==
- Australian wine
- List of wineries in Western Australia
- Western Australian wine
- Margaret River Wine Association
