= Hancock Prospecting =

Australian mining and agriculture company

Hancock Prospecting Pty Ltd
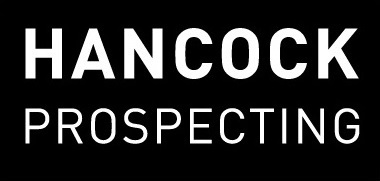
- Type: Private
- Industry: Mining and Agriculture
- Predecessor: Hancock Prospecting Limited; Hancock Resources; Hanwright Pty Limited; Hancock & Wright Limited
- Founded: 25 November 1955
- Founder: Lang Hancock
- Headquarters: Perth, Western Australia, Australia
- Number of locations: Multiple projects in Australia and in the UK
- Key people: Gina Rinehart (Executive Chairwoman)
- Products: Iron ore and thermal coal; and Joint venture activities in ferruginous manganese, uranium, molybdenum, lead, zinc, gold, diamonds, and petroleum
- Revenue: $16.6 billion (2021)
- Net income: $7.3 billion (2021)
- Owner: Gina Rinehart; Hope Margaret Hancock Trust
- Subsidiaries: Hancock Coal Pty Limited; Hancock Alpha West Pty Limited
- Website: www.hancockprospecting.com.au

Hancock Prospecting Pty Ltd is an Australian-owned mining and agricultural business run by Executive Chairwoman Gina Rinehart and CEO Garry Korte. At various stages of its trading history, the company has been known as Hancock Prospecting Ltd, Hancock Resources Ltd, Hanwright Pty Ltd, Hancock & Wright Ltd, and Hancock Prospecting Pty Ltd.

Hancock Prospecting Pty Ltd is owned by Rinehart (76.6%) and the Hope Margaret Hancock Trust (23.4%).

The company was founded in 1955 by Rinehart's father, the late Lang Hancock. Hancock Prospecting holds the mineral rights to some of the largest Crown land leases in the Pilbara region of Western Australia.

Gina Rinehart has disputed accusations that she is an heiress. Through Rinehart's spokesperson and chief financial officer at Hancock Prospecting, Jay Newby, Rinehart has claimed that upon assuming the role of the Executive Chairwoman, she took over a company that was in a perilous financial position with significant debt and major assets mortgages and under threat of seizure.

== Activities ==
The history of Hancock Prospecting dates from the late 1930s when Hancock and Peter Wright, a former schoolmate, formed a partnership, named Hanwright. One of the partnership's early ventures was an asbestos mine at Wittenoom, Western Australia. Hanwright and Rio Tinto reached agreement in the 1960s, where Hanwright secured 2.5 percent share in all iron ore sold from its Pilbara discoveries.

The Hancock Group of Companies holds numerous iron ore leases in the Pilbara. The leases cover an area of 500 square kilometres (190 sq mi) predominantly in the Central Pilbara region and contain mineable reserves of Brockman and Marra Mamba ore of over 850 million tonnes (940×10^{6} short tons). Leases in the Eastern Pilbara region contain mineable reserves of Marra Mamba ore of over 2 billion tonnes (2.2×10^{9} short tons), and over 500 million tonnes (550×10^{6} short tons) of ferruginous manganese in their Nicholas Downs Project, which is a joint venture with mining services company Mineral Resources.

In 2011, the company was estimated to earn about A$870 million in revenue per year; based on a 50% share of profits generated at the Hope Downs mine, operated by Rio Tinto. Hope Downs production levels of 30 million tonnes (33×10^{6} short tons) per year and at 2011 prices (around US$140 per tonne) generated over A$2 billion in revenue, and about A$700 million in net cash. In addition, the company received a 1.25% royalty from iron ore sales by Hamersley Iron (a Rio Tinto subsidiary) which delivered approximately A$170 million a year.

Hancock Prospecting exploration activities are done under the Jacaranda Alliance, a joint venture between Hancock, Minerals Australia Pty Ltd, and several former executives of Rio Tinto. Exploration and evaluation work on uranium, molybdenum, lead, zinc, gold, diamonds and petroleum deposits are conducted in Australia, Papua New Guinea, New Zealand and South East Asia.

As of 2016, Hancock Prospecting diversified its interests into the cattle industry, acquiring 67% of S. Kidman & Co.

In 2023, descendants of Peter Wright, via Wright Prospecting, commenced civil legal action against Hancock Prospecting in the WA Supreme Court. Wright Prospecting claimed that the agreement between Hancock and Wright included a division of certain Hanwright assets, assigning some to Wright Prospecting and others to Hancock Prospecting. Wright Prospecting sought its half of the partnership's 2.5 percent in royalties — or 1.25 percent of all profits made, likely worth several hundred million dollars. Wright Prospecting also argued that Hope Downs 4, 5 and 6 was a shared Hanwright asset — worth billions of dollars.

Hancock Prospecting owns a nearly 15.7% stake in Australian mining company Arafura Rare Earths.

=== Institute of Public Affairs ===
Hancock Prospecting significantly funds the Institute of Public Affairs (IPA), paying the IPA $2.3 million in financial year 2016 and $2.2 million in financial year 2017, which represents one-third to a half of the IPA's total revenue in those years. These payments were not disclosed in IPA annual reports, and Rinehart's daughter Bianca Hope Hayward submitted in court that the Hancock Prospecting payments were credited to Rinehart in an individual capacity. Gina Rinehart was made a life member of the IPA in November 2016.

== Attitudes towards indigenous peoples ==
Perhaps the most well known controversy in the history of the company centres around the racist views of founder Lang Hancock towards Indigenous Australians. Hancock is quoted as saying,

"Mining in Australia occupies less than one-fifth of one percent of the total surface of our continent and yet it supports 14 million people. Nothing should be sacred from mining whether it's your ground, my ground, the blackfellow's ground or anybody else's. So the question of Aboriginal land rights and things of this nature shouldn’t exist."

In a 1984 television interview, Hancock suggested forcing unemployed indigenous Australians − specifically "the ones that are no good to themselves and who can't accept things, the half-castes" − to collect their welfare cheques from a central location. And when they had gravitated there, "I would dope the water up so that they were sterile and would breed themselves out in the future, and that would solve the problem."

Executive Chairwoman of Hancock Prospecting, Gina Rinehart, caused controversy in 2022, when she failed to apologise for or denounce comments made by her late father in the 1984 television interview. Hancock Prospecting subsequently withdrew an A$15 million sponsorship from Netball Australia after Indigenous netballer Donnell Wallam voiced concerns about the deal and the impact of the comments, pertaining to a genocide, by "poisoning" and "sterilising" Indigenous Australians to "solve the problem"; as well as concerns about the company's environmental record.

== Hope Margaret Hancock Trust ==
In 1988 Lang Hancock established the Hope Margaret Hancock Trust, nominating Rinehart as trustee, with his four grandchildren named as beneficiaries. The Trust owns a quarter of the shares in Hancock Prospecting. In 2011 Rinehart's daughter, Hope Rinehart Welker, commenced a commercial action in the New South Wales Supreme Court for reasons understood to be related to the conduct of the trustee. The action sought to remove Rinehart as sole trustee. Her brother, John, and sister, Bianca, were later revealed as parties to the dispute.

In an agreement reached between the parties, the Court granted an interim non-publication order in September 2011. In making the interim order, Justice Paul Brereton stated: "This is not the first occasion of discord in the family, which has immense wealth, no small part of which resides in the trust. In the past, the affairs of the family, including such discord, has attracted considerable publicity in the media." Then, in a judgement handed down on 7 October 2011, Justice Brereton stated that he intended to dismiss an application by Rinehart, that there be a stay on court action, and that the family be directed into mediation. In December 2011, three justices of the NSW Court of Appeal lifted the suppression orders on the case. However, a stay was granted until 3 February 2012 and extended by the High Court of Australia until 9 March 2012. Rinehart's application for suppression was supported by Ginia Rinehart (Gina Rinehart's daughter), but was opposed by Hope, John and Bianca. A subsequent application by Rinehart for a non-publication order on the grounds of fear of personal and family safety was dismissed by the NSW Supreme Court on 2 February 2012. In March 2012, when the suppression order was lifted, it was revealed that Rinehart had delayed the vesting date of the trust, which had prompted the court action by her three older children.

Rinehart stood down as trustee during the hearing in October 2013. While Rinehart's lawyers subsequently declared any legal matters closed, John and Bianca's legal representatives proceeded with a trial in the NSW Supreme Court to deal with allegations of misconduct, whereby Rinehart was accused of having "unclean hands". As of October 2013 it appeared likely that the matter would be settled by the court appointing a new trustee.

== Projects ==
- Balfour Downs Station Manganese Operation, northeast of Newman, a joint venture with Mineral Resources
- Hope Downs mine, northwest of Newman, a joint venture with Rio Tinto
- Roy Hill project, south of Port Hedland, a joint venture between Hancock Prospecting (70%), Marubeni (15%), POSCO (12.5%), and China Steel Corporation (2.5%)
- Alpha Coal project, Galilee Basin in Central Queensland
- Kevin's Corner coal project, Galilee Basin in Central Queensland
- Nicholas Downs mine, northwest of Newman, a joint venture with Mineral Resources

== See also ==
- Pilbara historical timeline
