= Livingstone Range (Canada) =

Mountain range in the Canadian Rockies

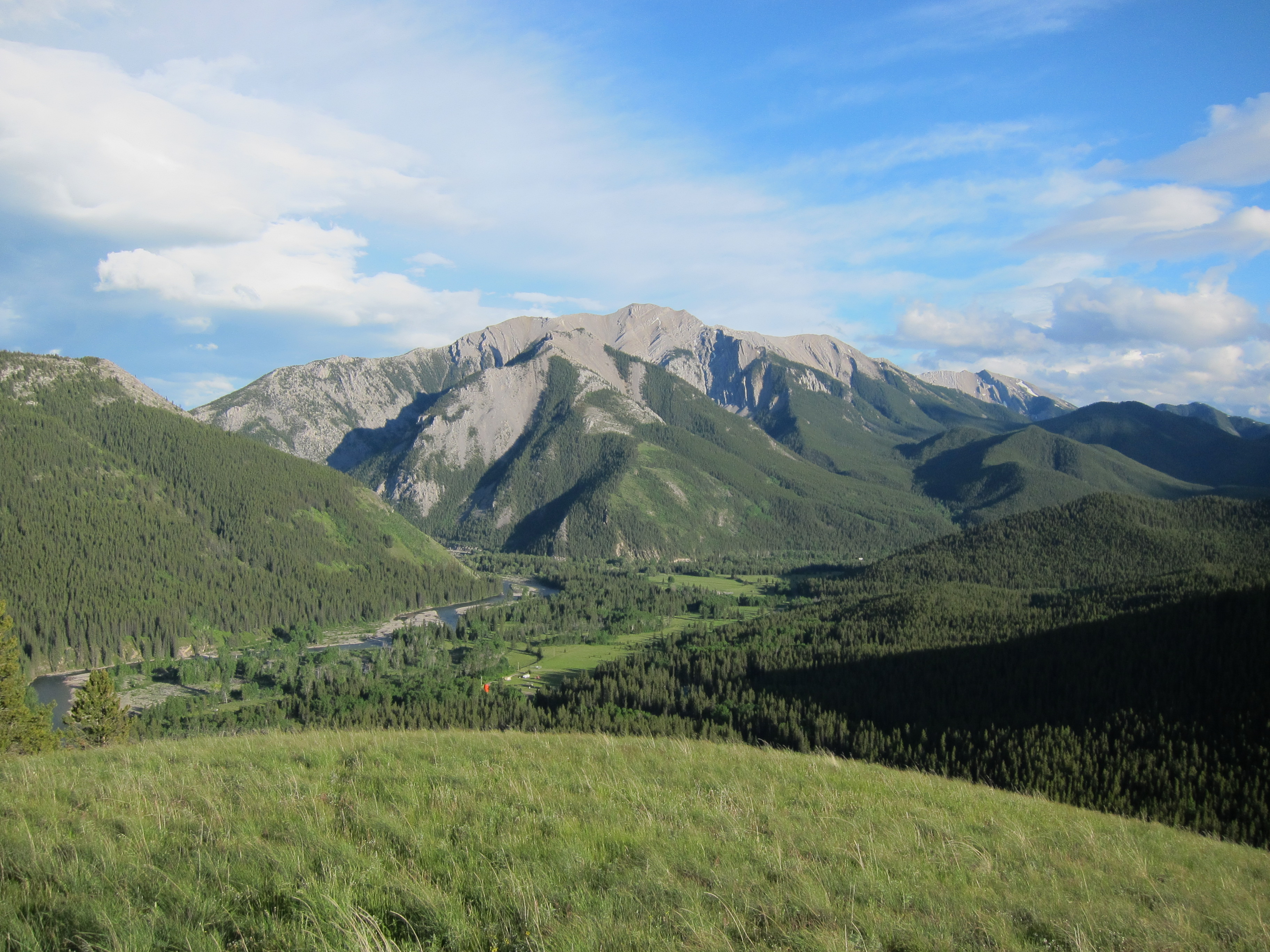
- NW face of Thunder Mountain

Highest point
- Peak: Centre Peak
- Elevation: 2,549 m (8,363 ft)
- Listing: Mountains of Alberta
- Coordinates: 49°56′35″N 114°20′07″W

Geography
- Location within Alberta
- Country: Canada
- Province: Alberta
- Parent range: Canadian Rockies (Southern Continental Ranges)
- Topo map: NTS 82G9 Blairmore

The Livingstone Range is a sub-range of the Canadian Rockies in Alberta, Canada. It forms the eastern boundary of the Rockies in the south of the province. Its northern boundary is the Highwood River and it extends to Crowsnest Pass in the south. The Livingstone and Oldman Rivers bound it to the west.

== History ==
The range was named after the explorer David Livingstone by Thomas Blakiston, an assistant of John Palliser, in 1858. When explorer Peter Fidler climbed Thunder Mountain in 1792, he became the first European to make a recorded ascent in the Canadian Rockies.

== Mountains ==
The mountains and peaks of the Livingstone Range are identified below.

| Mountain/Peak | Elevation | | Coordinates |
| Mountain/Peak | m | ft | Coordinates |
|---|---|---|---|
| Centre Peak | 2,549 | 8,363 | |
| Mount Burke | 2,542 | 8,340 | 50°17'24"N, 114°31'30"W |
| Plateau Mountain | 2,438 | 7,999 | 50°12'N, 114°30'W |
| Coffin Mountain | 2,429 | 7,969 | 44°37'17"N, 122°2'38"W |
| Mount Livingstone | 2,422 | 7,946 | |
| Cauldron Peak | 2,393 | 7,851 | |
| Hailstone Butte | 2,373 | 7,785 | |
| Sentinel Peak | 2,373 | 7,785 | 50°15'20.2"N, 114°28'51.6"W |
| Thunder Mountain | 2,335 | 7,661 | |
| Mount Hornecker | 2,271 | 7,451 | |
| Sheep Mountain | 2,271 | 7,451 | |
| Saddle Mountain | 2,240 | 7,350 | |
| Windy Peak | 2,240 | 7,350 | |
