= Hope Downs mine =

Iron ore mine in Western Australia

Hope Downs
- Location in Western Australia
- Interactive map of Hope Downs
- Location: Shire of East Pilbara, Pilbara, Western Australia, Australia; 22°57′29″S 119°07′34″E
- Products: Iron ore
- Production: 30 million tonnes/annum
- Opened: 2007
- Company: Rio Tinto Iron Ore (50%) Hancock Prospecting (50%)
- Website: Rio Tinto Iron Ore website Hancock Prospecting website

The Hope Downs mine is an iron ore mining complex located in the Pilbara region of Western Australia. It comprises five (soon to be six, Bedded Hilltop @ Hope 1) large open-pit mines (Hope 1 North, Hope 1 South, Hope 2, Hope 4 and Baby Hope). The mines are co-owned by the Hancock Group and Rio Tinto, and the complex was named after Hope Hancock, Gina Rinehart's mother.

After the establishment of successful operations at Hope 1 North and South from 2007 onwards, Hope Downs 4 was developed, commencing production in 2013. Hope 4 is about 30 kilometres (19 mi) north of Newman, and had a reserve of 162Mt as at 2016. Production at Baby Hope started in 2018.

The Hamersley Range, where the mine is located, contains 80 percent of all identified iron ore reserves in Australia and is one of the world's major iron ore provinces.

In 2009, the combined Pilbara operations produced 202 million tonnes of iron ore, a 15 percent increase from 2008. The Pilbara operations accounted for almost 13 percent of the world's 2009 iron ore production of 1.59 billion tonnes. In 2010, the project leases were estimated to have 1,450 million tonnes of mineable ore and the mines to have an expected life of more than 30 years.

== Overview ==
Iron ore mines in the Pilbara region

Rio Tinto iron ore operations in the Pilbara began in 1966. Exploration work through Hancock Prospecting at the Hope Downs 4 deposit began in 1992. Hancock unsuccessfully tried to develop the project with a number of partners, briefly rumored to be planning to join up with the Fortescue Metals Group in 2005, who was then developing its Cloud Break mine in the region. The development of the project suffered further delays when attempts to gain access to BHP Billiton's rail network failed, burdening the project with a further A$1 billion in cost to construct rail and port infrastructure. Eventually, in July 2005, Rio Tinto became a partner in the project instead, making thereby the construction of major infrastructure unnecessary, and, after spending A$1.3 billion, the mine moved into production in November 2007. The mine has an annual production capacity of 30 million tonnes of iron ore, sourced from open-pit operations. The ore is processed on site before being loaded onto rail.

In the first half of 2009, Rio Tinto upgraded the mine from an annual production of 22 million tonnes to 30 million tonnes.

Ore from the mine is then transported to the coast through the Hamersley & Robe River railway, where it is loaded onto ships. The 30 kilometre spur line connecting the mine with Rio Tinto's existing railway system was named "Lang Hancock Railway" in honor of Lang Hancock, founder of Hancock Prospecting and discoverer of the iron ore deposit.

The mine's workforce is on a fly-in fly-out roster. In 2009, the mine employed 787 people, an increase in comparison to 2008, when it only employed 453.

Rio Tinto declared its intention to expand the mine, spending a further A$1.78 billion on the Hope Downs 4 project, scheduled to produce 15 million tonnes of iron ore annually by 2013.

== In popular culture ==
In June 2018, Australian indie rock band Rolling Blackouts Coastal Fever named their debut album Hope Downs after the vast mining complex, explaining that it evoked the notion of "standing at the edge of the void of the big unknown, and finding something to hold on to".
