= Gina Rinehart =

Australian businesswoman (born 1954)

Gina Rinehart AO
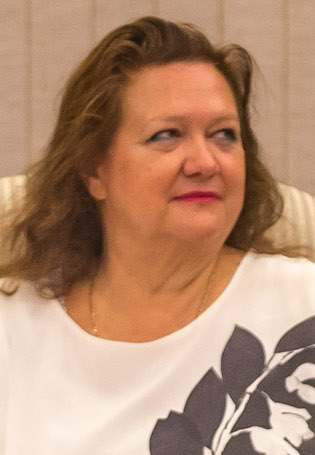
- Rinehart in 2015
- Born: Georgina Hope Hancock; 9 February 1954 (age 72); Perth, Western Australia, Australia
- Education: St Hilda's School
- Occupations: Mining magnate; company chairwoman, heiress.
- Board member of: Hancock Prospecting
- Spouses: Greg Hayward (m. 1973; div. 1981); Frank Rinehart (m. 1983; died 1990)
- Children: 4, including John Hayward-Hancock
- Parents: Lang Hancock (father); Hope Nicholas (mother)
- Website: www.ginarinehart.com.au

Georgina Hope Rinehart (née Hancock, born 9 February 1954) is an Australian mining magnate, businesswoman and heiress. She is the chairwoman of Hancock Prospecting, a privately owned mining company founded by her father, Lang Hancock.

Rinehart was born in Perth, and spent her early years in the Pilbara region. She boarded at St Hilda's Anglican School for Girls. After dropping out of University of Sydney, she went to work at Hancock Prospecting. When Lang Hancock died in 1992, Rinehart succeeded him as the new chair, as Lang Hancock's only child.

In the 2010s, Rinehart began investing in areas outside the mining industry, such as in Ten Network Holdings and Fairfax Media, and bought several cattle stations; she sold her shares in Fairfax and all cattle stations within a decade.

Rinehart is Australia's richest person. Her wealth reached around A$29 billion in 2012, at which point she overtook Christy Walton as the world's richest woman and was included on the Forbes list of The World's 100 Most Powerful Women. Rinehart's net worth dropped significantly over the following few years due to a slowdown in the Australian mining sector. Forbes estimated her net worth in 2019 at US$14.8 billion as published in the list of Australia's 50 richest people. However, her wealth was rebuilt again during 2020 due to increased demand for Australian iron ore, so that by May 2023, her net worth as published in the 2023 Financial Review Rich List was estimated in excess of A$37 billion; while in March 2021, The Australian Business Review stated her wealth equalled A$36.28 billion. As of September 2020 Forbes considered Rinehart one of the world's ten richest women. Rinehart was Australia's wealthiest person from 2011 to 2015, according to both Forbes and The Australian Financial Review; and again every year since 2020, according to The Australian Business Review and The Australian Financial Review.

== Personal life ==
Rinehart was born on 9 February 1954 at St John of God Subiaco Hospital in Perth, Western Australia. She is the only child of Hope Margaret Nicholas and Lang Hancock. Until age four, Rinehart lived with her parents at Nunyerry, 60 km (37 mi) north of Wittenoom. Her family then moved to Mulga Downs station in the Pilbara. Later Rinehart boarded at St Hilda's Anglican School for Girls in Perth. In the early 1970s, Rinehart dropped out of her economics degree at the University of Sydney because she considered her associate professor too left-wing. She subsequently worked for her father, gaining extensive knowledge of the Pilbara iron ore industry. Rinehart rebuilt the HPPL company to become one of the most successful private companies in Australia's history.

As a teenager, Rinehart met Englishman Greg Milton, who had come to Australia seeking work and was employed at a Hancock-owned hardware store in Wittenoom. In 1973, when Rinehart was 19, they married at St Andrew's Cathedral in Sydney. At this time Milton changed his surname to an earlier family name Hayward by deed poll at her request to make his name more compatible with the Hancock family. Their children John Langley and Bianca Hope were born in 1976 and 1977 respectively. The couple separated in 1979 and divorced in 1981. During the period between their separation and divorce, Milton was permitted to see his children once a week in the garage of the family home in Perth. He later described the arrangement as emotionally painful for both himself and the children.

In 1983, Rinehart married corporate lawyer Frank Rinehart, aged 66, in Las Vegas, when she was in her late twenties. Rinehart's father, Lang Hancock, disapproved of the marriage and refused to attend the wedding; he later came to believe that the couple were attempting to wrest control of his company from him. Frank had previously practised tax and estate law in New York. Frank pleaded guilty in the United States to criminal tax fraud, and was convicted of a federal felony involving the falsification of his tax returns, for which he received a one-year suspended jail sentence. He was also disbarred in three states. Frank's son, Chris Rinehart, said that his father lacked stable employment when he met Gina, while her son, John Hancock, recalled that his stepfather had beaten or threatened to beat him on several occasions, including punching him in the face through an open rear window of the family's Range Rover during a drive from Perth to Broome when Hancock was 12. Gina and Frank had two daughters, Hope and Ginia, born in 1986 and 1987, respectively. Frank died in 1990 of a heart attack.

Rinehart and her step-mother, Rose Porteous, were involved in a legal fight from 1992 over Hancock's death and estate. The dispute took 14 years to settle, with HPPL retaining the mining tenements that Porteous had alleged did not belong to the company.

In 1999, the Western Australian state government approved a proposal to name a mountain range in honour of her family. Hancock Range is situated about 65 km (40 mi) north-west of the town of Newman at 23°00′23″S 119°12′31″E and commemorates the family's contribution to the establishment of the pastoral and mining industry in the Pilbara region.

In 2003, at age 27, Rinehart's son John changed his surname by deed poll from his birth name Hayward to Hancock, his maternal grandfather's name. Since 2014, Rinehart has had a difficult relationship with her son, John; and was not present at his wedding to Gemma Ludgate. John's sister, Bianca Hope Rinehart, who was once positioned to take over the family business, served as a director of Hancock Prospecting and HMHT Investments until 31 October 2011, when she was replaced by her half-sister, Ginia Rinehart. In 2013, Bianca married her partner Sasha Serebryako in Hawaii, but Rinehart did not attend the wedding. Rinehart's other daughter, Hope, married Ryan Welker, and they divorced while living in New York. Rinehart attended both her younger daughters' weddings.

In May 2024, Rinehart demanded that an "unflattering" portrait of herself by Indigenous artist Vincent Namatjira be removed from display at the National Gallery of Australia.

For over 13 years Rinehart was involved in a legal dispute over mining royalties. The case stemmed from old agreement between her father, Lang Hancock, and his business partner Peter Wright, over shared mining interests managed under a business called Hanwright. Wright's heirs argued they were entitled to mining rights and royalties. In a separate dispute, Rinehart's children claimed she had restructured the assets to deny them access to the family wealth. In 2026, the Supreme Court of Western Australia ruled that Rinehart retained ownership of the mining rights, but must share a portion of royalties, with 50% of certain payments awarded to the Wright family and partial entitlements granted to other claimants. The court rejected the claims by her children over ownership rights.

=== Hope Margaret Hancock Trust ===
In 1988, Lang Hancock established the Hope Margaret Hancock Trust, nominating Rinehart as trustee, with his four grandchildren named as beneficiaries. Gina Rinehart was appointed to run the trust until the youngest of her four children, Ginia Rinehart, turned 25 in 2011. The Trust owns 23.6% of the shares in Hancock Prospecting, and as of June 2015 was believed to be valued at about A$5 billion.

In 2011, Rinehart's daughter, Hope Rinehart Welker, commenced a commercial action in the New South Wales Supreme Court for reasons understood to be related to the conduct of the trustee. The action sought to remove Rinehart as sole trustee. Her brother, John, and sister, Bianca, were later revealed as parties to the dispute.

In an agreement reached between the parties, the Court granted an interim non-publication order in September 2011. In making the interim order, Justice Paul Brereton stated: "This is not the first occasion of discord in the family, which has immense wealth, no small part of which resides in the trust. In the past, the affairs of the family, including such discord, has attracted considerable publicity in the media." Then, in a judgement handed down on 7 October 2011, Justice Brereton stated that he intended to dismiss an application by Rinehart, that there be a stay on court action, and that the family be directed into mediation. In December 2011, three justices of the NSW Court of Appeal lifted the suppression orders on the case. However, a stay was granted until 3 February 2012 and extended by the High Court of Australia until 9 March 2012. Rinehart's application for suppression was supported by Ginia Rinehart, but was opposed by Hope, John and Bianca. A subsequent application by Rinehart for a non-publication order on the grounds of fear of personal and family safety was dismissed by the NSW Supreme Court on 2 February 2012. In March 2012, when the suppression order was lifted, it was revealed that Rinehart had delayed the vesting date of the trust, which had prompted the court action by her three older children.

Rinehart stood down as trustee during the hearing in October 2013. While Rinehart's lawyers subsequently declared any legal matters closed, John and Bianca's legal representatives proceeded with a trial in the NSW Supreme Court to deal with allegations of misconduct. The Court handed down its decision on 28 May 2015 in which Bianca was appointed as the new trustee.

== Business career ==
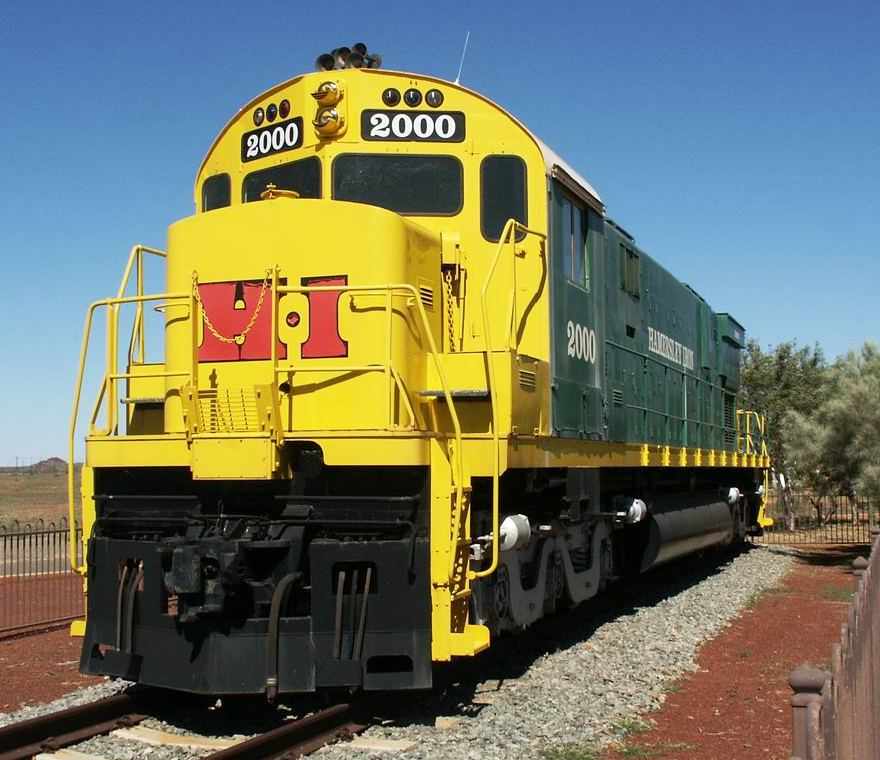
A 20 class locomotive at 7 Mile Yard near Karratha, Western Australia, which serves Hope Downs mine, co-owned by Hancock Group and Rio Tinto

After the death of her father in March 1992, Rinehart became Executive Chairman of Hancock Prospecting Pty Limited (HPPL) and the HPPL Group of companies. All companies within the group are privately owned. With the notable exception of receiving a royalty stream from Hamersley Iron since the late 1960s, Lang Hancock's mining activities were mainly related to exploration and the accumulation of vast mining leases. The BBC journalist, Nick Bryant, argues that while Rinehart was a beneficiary of her father's royalty deals, she "transformed the family business by spotting, earlier than most, the vast potential of the China market."

Rinehart achieved the Roy Hill tenements in 1993, the year after her father's death, having applied for them five months after her father's death, and focused on developing Roy Hill and Hancock Prospective undeveloped deposits, raising capital through joint venture partnerships and turning the leases into revenue producing mines.

Hancock Prospecting owns 50 per cent of Hope Downs and shares of 50 per cent of the profits generated by the 4 Hope Downs mine, which is operated by Rio Tinto under a joint management committee and produces 47 million tonnes of iron ore annually. Another joint venture with Mineral Resources at Nicholas Downs, northwest of Newman, is producing 500 million tonnes of ferruginous manganese. Majority stakes in the Alpha Coal and Kevin's Corner coal projects in Central Queensland were sold to GVK in 2011. After receiving approval from the Commonwealth Minister for the Environment in 2012, these coal projects were subsequently not developed. The Roy Hill Iron ore project, south of Port headline, in the Pilbara produces 60 million tonnes a year, with approvals pending to reach 70 million tonnes per annum.

In 2010, Rinehart took a 10 per cent stake in Ten Network Holdings; James Packer had acquired an 18 per cent stake in the same company shortly before. Since then she also acquired a substantial stake in Fairfax Media. Rinehart was a major player in the media and no longer limits her interests to the mining business. In February 2012 she increased her stake in Fairfax to over 12 per cent, and became the largest shareholder of the company. Fairfax journalists were reportedly fearful that she wanted to turn them into a "mouthpiece for the mining industry". In June 2012, she increased her stake further to 18.67 per cent, and was believed to be seeking three board seats and involvement in editorial decisions in Fairfax's newspaper division. Negotiations between Fairfax and Hancock Prospecting broke down in late June because of disagreements over Fairfax's editorial independence policy and other issues relating to board governance; chairman Roger Corbett subsequently announced that Rinehart would not be offered any seats on the board. After failing to get board representation she sold her shareholding in 2015.

In 2015, Rinehart was listed as the 37th-most-powerful woman in the world by Forbes; a decline from her 2014 and 2013 rankings as the 27th- and the 16th-most-powerful woman, respectively. In 2023, she ranked 48th in Forbes list of "World's 100 most powerful women".

Later the same year, Rinehart acquired Fossil Downs Station after it was placed on the market for the first time in 133 years. The 4,000 km^{2} (1,544 sq mi) property was stocked with 15,000 head of cattle and the sale price was not disclosed, but it was estimated to be between A$25 to 30 million. Rinehart had acquired a 50% stake in Liveringa and Nerrima Stations in 2014 for A$40 million.

In October 2015, Rinehart planned to open the huge Roy Hill mine just eight months after she secured A$7.9 billion in funding. Initial shipments of iron ore were sent to China. In October 2016, it was announced that Hancock Prospecting had struck a deal to invest in AIM-listed UK-based mining company Sirius Minerals to help bring to fruition their North Yorkshire Polyhalite Project.

In a 1984 television interview, Rinehart's late father Lang Hancock suggested forcing unemployed indigenous Australians − specifically "the ones that are no good to themselves, who can't accept things, the half-castes" − to collect their welfare cheques from a central location. And when they had gravitated there, I would dope the water up so that they were sterile and would breed themselves out in the future, and that would solve the problem." Rinehart was dragged in controversy in 2022, when she declined to apologize for the comments her father made. Hancock Prospecting subsequently withdrew an A$15 million sponsorship from Netball Australia after Indigenous netballer Donnell Wallam voiced concerns about the deal and the impact of the comments, pertaining to a genocide, by "poisoning" and "sterilising" Indigenous Australians to "solve the problem"; as well as concerns about the company's environmental record.

In June 2021, Little Green Pharma, a medical cannabis company, revealed Rinehart had invested $15 million. This gave Hancock Prospecting a 10% stake in Little Green Pharma. Rinehart was described by LGP's founder as "supportive, loyal and really involved" and the funding assisted LGP in purchasing additional infrastructure in Denmark and expand its business overseas.

In April 2024, Rinehart revealed a 5.82% stake in Lynas Rare Earths and a 5.3% holding in MP Materials. Lynas and MP Materials produce rare earth materials, an industry dominated by China which produces 60 percent of the world's rare earth.

Rinehart, through her company Northback Holdings Corporation, has been embroiled in legal disputes concerning the Grassy Mountain Coal Project in the Ranchland, Alberta, Canada. This project, initially proposed by Benga Mining Limited (Benga)—now Northback Holdings Corporation—faced significant opposition. In their 17 June 2021 final report, the joint provincial-federal review panel composed of the Alberta Energy Regulator (AER) and the Minister of Environment and Climate Change Canada (ECCC) denied Benga Mining's application for the Grassy Mountain Coal Project because of significant adverse environmental effects, particularly regarding selenium contamination in local waterways. Despite these setbacks, Rinehart's company has continued to pursue the project, claiming that the AER treated them unfairly by allowing new applications for exploratory drilling after the initial rejection. In response to the AER's decisions, Rinehart has filed multiple lawsuits against both the Alberta and Canadian governments, arguing that the regulatory process has been biased against her interests. The Alberta Court of Appeal has recently questioned the AER's decision to classify Grassy Mountain as an "advanced coal project," which could potentially revive Rinehart's plans. The ongoing legal battles reflect broader tensions between resource development interests and environmental protection in Alberta, with local ranchers and environmental advocates opposing the mine due to its potential impact on water security and land use.

== Political activities ==
In the 1970s, Rinehart was an active supporter of the Westralian Secession Movement, which her father had founded to work for the secession of Western Australia from the rest of the country. She also had some involvement with the Workers Party (later renamed the Progress Party), a libertarian organisation founded by businessman John Singleton.

Rinehart opposed the Rudd government's Mineral Resource Rent Tax and Carbon Pollution Reduction Scheme as part of a group of mining magnates that included Andrew Forrest. She founded the lobby group ANDEV, ("Australians for Northern Development and Economic Vision") and has sponsored the trips of prominent climate change denier Christopher Monckton to Australia. In October 2021, Rinehart garnered controversy after expressing climate change denialist views during a speech at her childhood primary school.

Since 2010 Rinehart has been actively promoting the cause of development of Australia's north and has spoken, written articles and published a book on this topic. Rinehart stresses that Australia must do more to welcome investment and improve its cost competitiveness, particularly when Australia faces record debt. She advocates a special economic zone in the North with reduced taxation and less regulations and has enlisted the support of many prominent Australians, plus the Institute of Public Affairs. In a 2012 article in the Australian Resources and Investment Magazine, Rinehart said that if people wanted to have more money they should "stop whingeing" and "Do something to make more money yourself − spend less time drinking or smoking and socialising, and more time working". She criticised what she saw as the "socialist" policies of the Australian Government of "high taxes" and "excessive regulation".

External videos
- Gina Rinehart YouTube Monologue, Sydney Mining Club
- Gina Rinehart calls for Australian wage cut, BBC

In a video posted to the Sydney Mining Club's YouTube channel on 23 August 2012, Rinehart expressed concern for Australia's economic competitiveness, noting how "Indeed if we competed in the Olympic Games as sluggishly as we compete economically, there would be an outcry." She said, "Furthermore, Africans want to work, and its workers are willing to work for less than two dollars a day. Such statistics make me worry for this country's future." Rinehart's views were dismissed by the Australian Prime Minister, Julia Gillard, who said that "It's not the Australian way to toss people $2, to toss them a gold coin, and then ask them to work for a day" and that "we support proper Australian wages and decent working conditions." The Australian Deputy Prime Minister and Treasurer at the time, Wayne Swan, described Rinehart's statement as an "insult to the millions of Australian workers who go to work and slog it out to feed the kids and pay the bills."

In 2010 and 2012, Rinehart lobbied for Australia to bring in more foreign workers.

She is a supporter of Donald Trump.. In November 2022, Rinehart was photographed attending Donald Trump's presidential campaign event at his Mar-a-Lago resort in Florida. In November 2025, Gina Rinehart was photographed attending Donald Trump's Halloween party at his Mar-a-Lago resort in Florida.

=== One Nation ===
Rinehart is a supporter and funder of Pauline Hanson's One Nation. In April 2026, Pauline Hanson and Barnaby Joyce stayed overnight at Gina Rinehart's Brisbane residence following One Nation fundraising events, with Joyce subsequently giving a television interview from the property. Parliamentary records showed that Hanson and Joyce declared flights provided by Hancock Prospecting on 13 April, while flight-tracking data indicated that they travelled from Brisbane to Sydney aboard Rinehart's private jet. In April 2026, Rinehart donated a new Cirrus G7 aircraft, valued at approximately A$1 million, to One Nation leader Pauline Hanson. In July 2026, Gina Rinehart paid for Pauline Hanson's flights from London to Sicily via Rome, where the pair were subsequently photographed together at a seaside location. In October 2026, One Nation MP Barnaby Joyce stated that mining magnate Gina Rinehart had purchased an office in Brisbane valued at approximately $8 million for use as the party's headquarters.

== Net worth ==
Rinehart is one of Australia's richest people, with Forbes estimating her net worth in 2019 at US$14.8 billion as published in the list of Australia's 50 richest people, and The Australian Financial Review estimating her net worth in 2025 at A$38.11 billion—the wealthiest Australian as published in the 2025 Financial Review Rich List.

Rinehart first appeared on the 1992 Financial Review Rich List (at the time called the BRW Rich 200), published annually in the BRW magazine, following the death of her father earlier that year. She has appeared every year since, and became a billionaire in 2006. Due to Australia's mining boom in the early 21st century, Rinehart's wealth increased significantly since 2010, and she diversified investments into media, taking holdings in Ten Network Holdings and Fairfax Media. According to BRW, she became Australia's richest woman in 2010, and Australia's richest person in 2011, and the first woman to lead the list. During 2012, BRW claimed Rinehart was the world's richest woman, surpassing Wal-Mart owner Christy Walton.

In 2007, she first appeared on Forbes Asia Australia's 40 Richest, with an estimated wealth of US$1 billion; more than doubling that the next year to US$2.4 billion; and then, despite the 2008 financial crisis, by 2011 had more than trebled to US$9 billion; doubled again in 2012 to US$18 billion; a slight reduction in 2013 to US$17 billion; and a slight increase in 2014 to US$17.6 billion. While still Australia's richest person, her wealth had reduced to US$12.3 billion by 2015 according to Forbes, and in 2016 Forbes assessed her net worth at US$8.5 billion, placing her second on the list of wealthiest Australians. As of 8 March 2024, Forbes had assessed her net worth as US$30.8 billion, and was ranked as the 56th of the global list of Forbes billionaires; and the wealthiest Australian billionaire.

In June 2011, Citigroup estimated that she was on course to overtake Carlos Slim, the Mexican magnate worth US$74 billion and Bill Gates, who is worth US$56 billion, mainly because she owns her companies outright. Using a price-to-earnings ratio of 11:1 that applied at that time to her business partner, Rio Tinto, the Australian internet business news service, SmartCompany, stated: "It is possible to see Rinehart's portfolio of coal and iron ore production spinning off annual profits approaching US$10 billion", giving her a "personal net worth valuation of more than US$100 billion".

In January 2012, there were further media reports that Rinehart's estimated wealth has increased to A$20 billion following estimates that the Roy Hill project was notionally valued at A$10 billion. Forbes magazine ranked her as the fourth-richest woman in 2012 with US$18 billion; the fifth-richest woman in 2013 with US$17 billion; and the sixth-richest woman in 2014 with US$17.6 billion. In 2012, BRW estimated her wealth at A$29.17 billion, with Ivan Glasenberg being her closest rival, with net wealth estimated at A$7.4 billion. At the time, BRW stated that it was possible Rinehart would become the first person with a net wealth of US$100 billion. As of December 2012, according to the Bloomberg Billionaires Index, Rinehart was the 37th-richest person in the world, with an estimated net worth of US$18.6 billion.

Rinehart's wealth rankings between 2013 and 2019 were adversely impacted by the fall in the wholesale iron ore price and the fall in the AUD/USD exchange rate. In May 2016, she had fallen from wealthiest Australian in 2011 to fourth, with A$6.06 billion, surpassed by property developer Harry Triguboff, with A$10.62 billion. By 2020, according to The Australian Financial Review, Rinehart had an estimated net worth of A$28.89 billion and was restored to the mantle of the wealthiest Australian; it was a title that she has maintained since that date, progressively increasing her net worth, year on year.

=== Wealth rankings ===
Year	Financial Review Rich List		Forbes Australia's 50 richest	
Year	Rank	Net worth A$	Rank	Net worth US$
2006	8 ▲	$1.80 billion ▲		
2007	4 ▲	$4.00 billion ▲	14 ▲	$1.00 billion ▲
2008	5 ▼	$4.39 billion ▲	6 ▲	$2.40 billion ▲
2009	4 ▲	$3.47 billion ▼	7 ▼	$1.50 billion ▼
2010	5 ▼	$4.75 billion ▲	9 ▼	$2.00 billion ▲
2011	1 ▲	$10.31 billion ▲	1 ▲	$9.00 billion ▲
2012	1	$29.17 billion ▲	1	$18.00 billion ▲
2013	1	$22.02 billion ▼	1	$17.00 billion ▼
2014	1	$20.01 billion ▼	1	$17.60 billion ▲
2015	1	$14.02 billion ▼	1	$12.30 billion ▼
2016	4 ▼	$6.06 billion ▼	2 ▼	$8.50 billion ▼
2017	3 ▲	$10.40 billion ▲	1 ▲	$14.8 billion ▲
2018	3	$12.68 billion ▲	1	$17.4 billion ▲
2019	2 ▲	$13.81 billion ▲	1	$14.8 billion ▼
2020	1 ▲	$28.89 billion ▲		
2021	1	$31.06 billion ▲		
2022	1	$34.00 billion ▲		
2023	1	$37.41 billion ▲		
2024	1	$40.61 billion ▲	1	$30.8 billion
2025	1	$38.11 billion ▼		

Legend
Icon	Description
Steady	Has not changed from the previous year
▲	Has increased from the previous year
▼	Has decreased from the previous year

=== Philanthropy ===
In a 2006 Business Review Weekly article reviewing the way Australia's rich support philanthropy, it was noted that Rinehart prefers to keep a low profile, partly to avoid being "harassed by other charities" and partly for reasons of privacy. Rinehart was publicly known for visiting girls' orphanages in Cambodia and was on the expert advisory board of SISHA, a Cambodian non-profit organisation campaigning against human trafficking, in particular by rescuing and assisting sexually exploited women and children. In August 2013, Rinehart resigned from the advisory board.

In 2012 Swimming Australia announced a $10 million funding arrangement over four years with the Georgina Hope Foundation in conjunction with Hancock Prospecting. The deal supports the Australian Swim Team through direct payments to elite and targeted development swimmers, as well supporting lesser known sports such as synchronised swimming. The arrangement was renewed for a further two years in August 2015 and includes naming rights to various Swimming Australia events, including the Australian Swimming Championships. In 2019, the sporting group described Rinehart as "part of [the] team" and "part of the swimming family."

== Awards and recognitions ==
Bond University awarded Rinehart an honorary doctorate in 2013 "in recognition of her commitment and contribution to the Australian economy and wider community."

In 2022, Rinehart was appointed as an Officer of the Order of Australia (AO) in the 2022 Australia Day Honours for "distinguished service to the mining sector, to the community through philanthropic initiatives, and to sport as a patron".

In 2025, Forbes listed her 52nd amongst World's 100 most powerful women.
