= Lang Hancock =

Australian businessman (1909–1992)

- Born: Langley Frederick George Hancock; 10 June 1909; Perth, Western Australia
- Died: 27 March 1992 (aged 82); Prix D'Amour, Mosman Park, Western Australia
- Occupation: Mining magnate
- Known for: Discovery of the world's largest iron deposit; Western Australian secessionism; other business and mining interests
- Board member of: Hancock Prospecting Pty Ltd
- Spouses: Susette Maley (m. 1935; div. 1944) Hope Nicholas Clark (m. 1947; died 1983) Rose Lacson (m. 1985)
- Children: Gina Rinehart

Langley Frederick George Hancock (10 June 1909 – 27 March 1992) was an Australian iron ore magnate from Western Australia who maintained a high profile in the spheres of business and politics. Famous initially for discovering the world's largest iron ore deposit in 1952 and becoming one of the richest men in Australia, he is now perhaps best remembered for his marriage to the much-younger Rose Porteous, a Filipino woman and his former maid. Hancock's daughter, Gina Rinehart, was bitterly opposed to Hancock's relationship with Porteous. The conflicts between Rinehart and Porteous overshadowed his final years and continued until more than a decade after his death.

== Early life ==
Langley ("Lang") Hancock was born on 10 June 1909 in Leederville, Perth, Western Australia. He was the eldest of four children born to Lilian (née Prior) and George Hancock. His mother had been born in South Australia and his father in Western Australia. His father's great-aunt was Emma Withnell, while a cousin was Sir Valston Hancock.

Lang spent his early childhood on the family station, Ashburton Downs, run by the three Hancock brothers. His interest in mining was sparked by his uncle John, who lived at Ashburton Downs and was a keen prospector. Hancock later moved to Mulga Downs Station in the north-west after his father, George Hancock, bought a farming property there. Initially educated at home, at the age of eight he began boarding at the St Aloysius Convent of Mercy in Toodyay. From 1924 to 1927, he attended Hale School in Perth, where he played for the school cricket and football teams. Upon completing his secondary education, he returned to Mulga Downs Station to help his father manage the property.

In 1935, he married Susette Maley. The couple lived at Mulga Downs, but Maley left Hancock to return to Perth, and their separation was formalised in 1944. Also in 1935, Hancock took over the management of Mulga Downs station from his father. He partnered with his schoolmate, E. A. "Peter" Wright, in running the property, later boasting that no deals between the two men were ever sealed with anything stronger than a handshake.

During the Second World War, Hancock served in a militia unit, the 11th (North-West) Battalion, Volunteer Defence Corps, and attained the rank of sergeant. On 4 August 1947, he married his second wife, Hope Margaret Nicholas, the mother of his only acknowledged child, Gina Rinehart. He and Hope remained married for 35 years, until her death in 1983 at the age of 66. In 2012, Hilda Kickett, who in 1992 had claimed to be Lang Hancock's illegitimate daughter, claimed that the late mining magnate had had an illicit affair with an Aboriginal cook on his property at Mulga Downs, resulting in her conception. Those claims have not been corroborated.

== Wittenoom Gorge ==
As a child, Hancock showed a keen interest in mining and prospecting from his uncle John Hancock Jr, and discovered asbestos at Wittenoom Gorge at the age of ten. He staked a claim at Wittenoom in 1934 and began mining blue asbestos there in 1938 with the company Australian Blue Asbestos.

The mine attracted the attention of CSR, who purchased the claim in 1943. Hancock retained a 49% share after the sale, but appears to have become quickly disillusioned about this arrangement, complaining that CSR viewed their 51% share as a licence to ignore his views. He sold the remainder of his claim in 1948. The mine would later become the source of much controversy, when hundreds of cases of asbestos-related diseases came to light. He was aware of the dangers of asbestos prior to selling his stake in Australian Blue Asbestos (as recently discovered papers have shown) but never accepted any liability, nor have his companies since his death. Neither the Australian federal government nor the Western Australian state government have pursued his companies for damages as of 2017.

== The Pilbara discovery ==
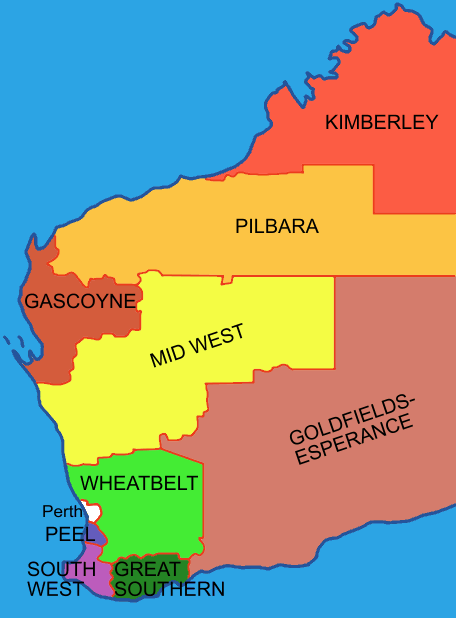
Hancock struck iron ore in the Pilbara region, in north-west WA

On 16 November 1952, Hancock claimed he discovered the world's largest deposit of iron ore in the Pilbara region of Western Australia. Hancock said he was flying from Nunyerry to Perth with his wife, Hope, when they were forced by bad weather to fly low, through the gorges of the Turner River. In Hancock's own words,

In November 1952, I was flying down south with my wife Hope, and we left a bit later than usual and by the time we got over the Hamersley Ranges, the clouds had formed and the ceiling got lower and lower. I got into the Turner River, knowing full well if I followed it through, I would come out into the Ashburton. On going through a gorge in the Turner River, I noticed that the walls looked to me to be solid iron and was particularly alerted by the rusty looking colour of it, it showed to me to be oxidised iron.

The story is widely accepted in modern descriptions of the discovery, but one biographer, Neill Phillipson, disputes Hancock's account. In Man of Iron he argues that there was no rain in the area of the Turner River on 16 November 1952 or indeed on any day in November 1952, a fact the Australian Bureau of Meteorology confirms. Hancock returned to the area many times and, accompanied by prospector Ken McCamey, followed the iron ore over a distance of 112 km (70 miles). He soon came to realise that he had stumbled across reserves of iron ore so vast that they could supply the entire world, thus confirming the discovery of the geologist Harry Page Woodward, who after his survey asserted:

"[t]his is essentially an iron ore country. There is enough iron ore to supply the whole world, should the present sources be worked out". – Annual General Report of the Government Geologist, 1890 But overseas demand at that time was negligible and development of the formations was uneconomic.

After 1920 development of the Yampi Sound deposits started but exports to Japan were curtailed by the Commonwealth Government in 1938. Prospecting and exploration of other ore deposits continued until 1952 where an agreement between the Government of Western Australia and BHP to build a steel mill and smelter in Kwinana was established. All other iron ore, known or unknown, was reserved to the Crown for 9 years. Representations were made to the Commonwealth Government to have the embargo lifted and in 1960 limited approval was granted for the export of iron ore from non-BHP deposits. This sparked a wave of intensive prospecting and exploration concentrated in the North West, the Hamersley Ranges in particular, where formation had been known but ore bodies not yet delineated. At this time Hancock revealed his discovery. Hancock had lobbied furiously for a decade to get the ban lifted and in 1961 was finally able to reveal his discovery and stake his claim.

In the mid-1960s Hancock turned once more to Peter Wright and the pair entered into a deal with mining giant Rio Tinto Group to develop the iron ore find. Hancock named it "Hope Downs" after his wife. Under the terms of the deal Rio Tinto set up and still administer a mine in the area. Wright and Hancock walked away with annual royalties of A$25 million, split evenly between the two men. In 1990, Hancock was estimated by Business Review Weekly to be worth a minimum of A$125 million.

== Political activity ==
Although Lang Hancock never aspired to political office, he held strong conservative political views and often entered the political arena. In addition to his activities in the 1950s, lobbying against government restrictions on the mining of iron ore, Hancock donated considerable sums of money to politicians of many political stripes. His political views aligned most closely with the Liberal and National Parties of Australia. He was a good friend and strong supporter of Queensland Premier Joh Bjelke-Petersen and donated A$632,000 to the Queensland National Party while Bjelke-Petersen was in charge. He gave A$314,000 to their counterparts in Western Australia, but also gave the Western Australian Labor Party A$985,000; because "at least they can't do any harm". Hancock had had a falling-out with Sir Charles Court and the Western Australian Liberals and was adamant that the Liberals should be kept out of power as long as possible.

Hancock also offered strong advice to the politicians he favoured. In 1977 he sent a Telex to the then-Treasurer of Australia Sir Phillip Lynch, telling him he needed to "stop money coming in to finance subversive activities, such as Friends of the Earth, which is a well-heeled foreign operation." He also suggested to Bjelke-Petersen that the Federal Government should attempt to censor the works of Ralph Nader and John Kenneth Galbraith, lest they "wreck Fraser's government".

In 1969 Hancock and his partner Peter Wright commenced publication in Perth of a weekly newspaper, The Sunday Independent, principally to help further their mining interests. Faced with strong competition, the newspaper is thought never to have turned a profit, Hancock largely relinquishing his interest in it in the early 70s and Wright selling it to The Truth in 1984.

Hancock was a staunch proponent of small government and resented what he considered to be interference by the Commonwealth Government in Western Australian affairs. He declared before a state Royal Commission in 1991 that "I have always believed that the best government is the least government", and that "Although governments do not and cannot positively help business, they can be disruptive and destructive."

Hancock bankrolled an unsuccessful secessionist party in the 1970s, and in 1979 published a book, Wake Up Australia, outlining what he saw as the case for Western Australian secession. The book was launched by Gina Rinehart and Bjelke-Petersen.

== Attitudes towards Aboriginal people ==
Hancock is quoted as saying,

"Mining in Australia occupies less than one-fifth of one percent of the total surface of our continent and yet it supports 14 million people. Nothing should be sacred from mining whether it's your ground, my ground, the blackfellow's ground or anybody else's. So the question of Aboriginal land rights and things of this nature shouldn't exist."

In a 1984 television interview, Hancock suggested forcing unemployed indigenous Australians − specifically "the ones that are no good to themselves and who can't accept things, the half-castes" − to collect their welfare cheques from a central location. "And when they had gravitated there, I would dope the water up so that they were sterile and would breed themselves out in the future, and that would solve the problem."

== Rose Porteous ==
In 1983, the same year as Hope Hancock's death, Rose Lacson (now Porteous) arrived in Australia from the Philippines on a three-month working visa. By the arrangement of Hancock's daughter, Gina Rinehart, Porteous began working as a maid for the newly widowed Lang Hancock.

Hancock and Porteous became romantically involved over the course of Porteous' employment and they were wed on 6 July 1985 in Sydney. It was a third marriage for each of them. Porteous, who was thirty-nine years younger than her husband, was often accused of gold digging because of their age disparity, as well as being unfaithful and promiscuous. As Porteous later stated: "I have been accused of sleeping with every man in Australia ... I would have been a very busy woman." Hancock's daughter, Gina Rinehart, who stood to inherit his entire estate, did not attend the wedding.

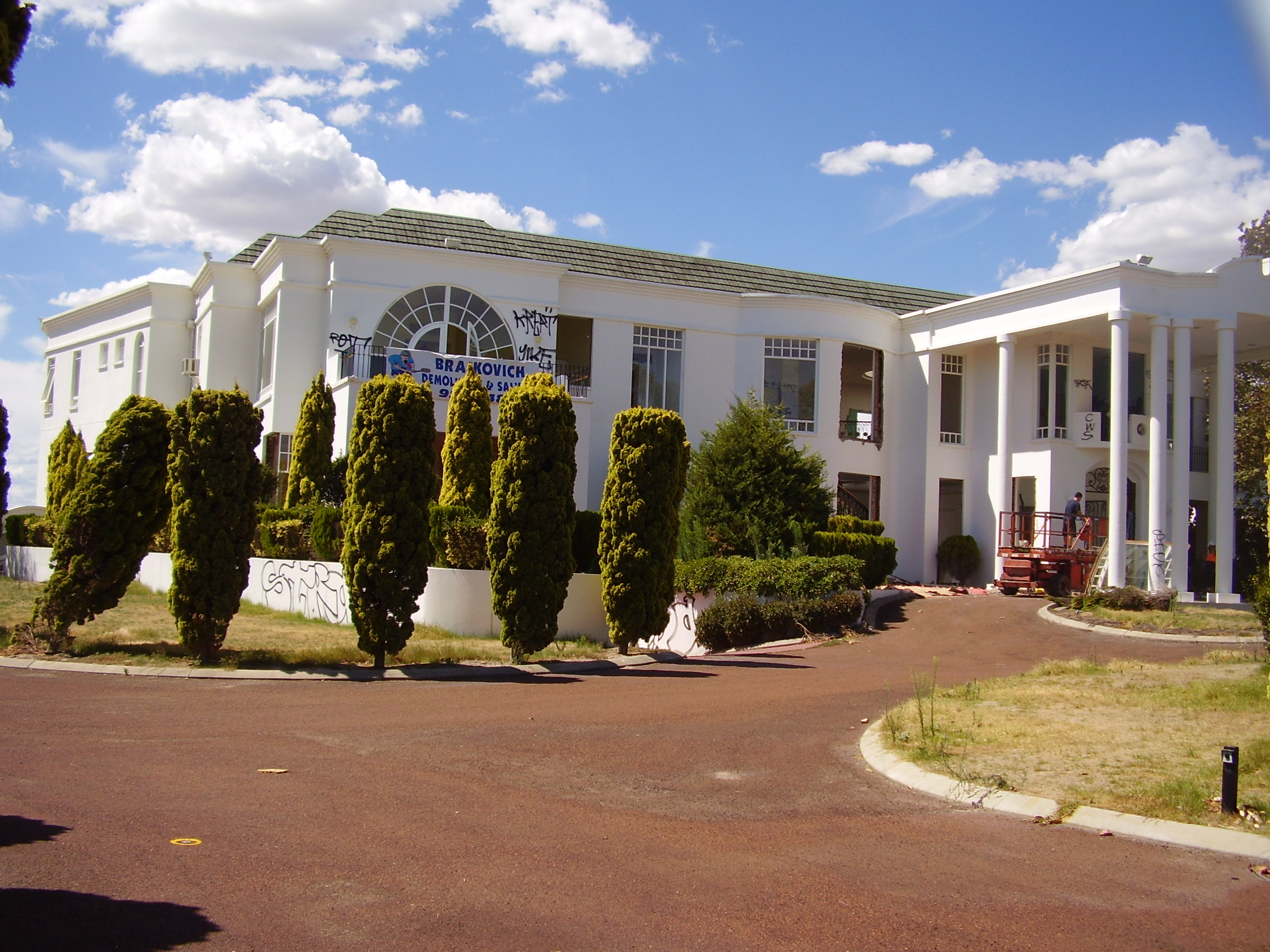
Prix d'Amour, during its demolition in early 2006.

Although the marriage would later prove tumultuous, early on Hancock was clearly infatuated with his young wife. He gave her money and investments in real estate in the Sydney area. Porteous, in turn, helped Hancock to look and act like a much younger man, belying his eight decades. As The Age put it, "Rose made Lang feel younger, sprucing up his wardrobe, dyeing his hair and getting rid of his cane." Together they built the "Prix d'Amour", a lavish 16-block mansion overlooking the Swan River. The mansion, which was modelled after Tara, the plantation mansion from the movie Gone with the Wind, was the setting for many large parties at which Hancock and Porteous would "dance into the night".

As the marriage wore on, however, the relationship between Lang and Rose began to break down. Rinehart would later claim that Hancock's bride had paid little attention to his worsening health, but had instead "screeched at him for money". Although there were many quarrels, the Hancocks remained married until Lang's death in 1992.

On 25 June 1992, less than three months after Hancock's death, Porteous married for the fourth time, to Hancock's long-time friend William Porteous. Rinehart was indignant at the haste with which her stepmother had remarried.

The Prix d'Amour, built in 1990, was bulldozed in March 2006. Western Australian finance minister Max Evans mourned the loss of the home as the excavators moved in and recalled Hancock had been bemused by his wife's desire for the sprawling mansion:

"He'd say, 'Mr Evans, I don't know why Rose wants this house, I'd be happy sleeping in a transportable.' "

Mrs Porteous told him she'd always wanted to live in Prix D'Amour, "but I don't want to clean it", she had added quickly.

== Death and inquest ==
In March 1992 Hancock died, aged 82 years, while living in the guesthouse of the Prix D'Amour. According to his daughter, the death was "unexpected" and came "despite strong will to live".

An autopsy showed that he had died of arteriosclerotic heart disease and police investigation revealed no evidence to contradict that. However, Hancock's daughter insisted that her stepmother had unnaturally hastened his death. Two successive state coroners refused to allow an inquest, but one was eventually granted in 1999 under the direction of the WA Attorney-General, Peter Foss.

After preliminary hearings during 2000, the inquest began in April 2001 with an initial estimate of 63 witnesses to be called over five weeks. The inquest was dominated by claims that Porteous had literally nagged Hancock to death with shrill tantrums and arguments. Porteous denied the allegations, famously explaining: "For anyone else it would be a tantrum, for me it's just raising my voice." In the last few days of Hancock's life, Porteous had attempted to pressure him into changing his will and Hancock eventually took out a restraining order against her. The inquest was put on hold after allegations that Rinehart had paid witnesses to appear and that some had lied in their testimony. It resumed three months later with a smaller witness list and ended with the finding that Hancock had died of natural causes and not as a result of Porteous' behaviour.

With a legal bill of A$2.7m, Rose and William Porteous commenced action against Rinehart, that was eventually settled out of court in 2003.

== Legacy ==
Hancock's daughter, Gina Rinehart, continues to chair Hancock Prospecting and its expansion into mining projects continues in Western Australia and other states of Australia, estimated to be earning about A$870 million in revenue in 2011. Rinehart is Australia's richest person and was also the world's richest woman for a period of time, with a net worth of A$29.17 billion during 2012; by 2019, her wealth had eased to around $US14.8 billion, according to Forbes.

The Hancock Range, situated about 65 kilometres (40 mi) north-west of the town of Newman at 23°00′23″S 119°12′31″E, commemorates the family's contribution to the establishment of the pastoral and mining industry in the Pilbara region.

== Bibliography ==
- Duffield, Robert (1979). Rogue Bull: The Story of Lang Hancock, King of the Pilbara (Hardback). Sydney: Collins. p. 231. ISBN 0-00-216423-X.
- Hancock, Lang (1979). Wake Up Australia!. Sydney: E J Dwyer. ISBN 0-85574-163-5 – via Internet Archive.
- Marshall, Debi (2001). Lang Hancock (Hardback). Sydney: Allen & Unwin. p. 288. ISBN 978-1-86508-415-2.
- Phillipson, Neill (1974). Man of Iron (Hardback). Melbourne: Wren. p. 206. ISBN 0-85885-079-6.
- Wainwright, Robert (2003). Rose (Hardback). Sydney: Allen & Unwin. p. 338. ISBN 1-86508-934-6.
