= 2023 MOVEit data breach =

Series of cyberattacks exploiting vulnerability in Progress Software's software

- Type: Cyberattack, data breach
- Cause: MOVEit vulnerabilities
- First reporter: Progress Software
- Suspects: Cl0p

In May 2023, a critical vulnerability in the MOVEit managed file transfer software was discovered. The discovery of this vulnerability triggered a wave of cyberattacks and data breaches. Exploited by the ransomware group CL0P, the flaw enabled unauthorized access to sensitive databases, leading to the compromise of over 2,700 organizations and exposing the personal data of approximately 93.3 million individuals. The breach had far-reaching effects across sectors like healthcare, finance, and government, emphasizing the systemic risks inherent in the interconnected nature of the digital supply chain.

== Background ==
MOVEit, a managed file transfer software developed by Ipswitch, Inc., a subsidiary of Progress Software, is widely used for securely transmitting large volumes of sensitive data across various industries, including government and highly regulated sectors. On May 28, 2023, a vulnerability in the MOVEit software was reported following unusual activity detected by a customer. This zero-day vulnerability enabled attackers to exploit public-facing servers via SQL injection, facilitating unauthorized file theft. The attacks were conducted using a custom web shell, known as LEMURLOOT, which impersonates legitimate ASP.NET files and can extract Microsoft Azure Storage Blob data.

== Timeline ==
According to cybersecurity firm Mandiant, the MOVEit vulnerability began being used on May 27, 2023.

On May 31 Progress Software released a patch for the vulnerability and stated the vulnerability “could lead to escalated privileges and potential unauthorized access to the environment”.

On June 3, the Government of Nova Scotia estimated that as many as 100,000 present and past employees were impacted by the breach.

On June 5, various organizations in the United Kingdom, including the BBC, British Airways, Boots, Aer Lingus, and payroll service Zellis were breached.

On June 6, Cl0p claimed responsibility for the attack on its site on the dark web. Cl0p claimed that the data stole from governments had been deleted (this was later disproved).

On June 12, Ernst & Young, Transport for London, and Ofcom separately announced that they had been affected, with Ofcom announcing that personal and confidential information was downloaded.

On June 15, CNN reported that the United States Department of Energy was among multiple United States government organizations affected by the MOVEit vulnerability. The following day, it was reported that the Louisiana Office of Motor Vehicles and Oregon Driver and Motor Vehicle Services were hit, affecting millions of residents.

== Responsibility ==
According to the Cybersecurity and Infrastructure Security Agency and the Federal Bureau of Investigation, the breaches are being conducted by Cl0p, a Russian-affiliated cyber gang.

== Impact ==
A running total maintained by cybersecurity company Emsisoft showed that more than 2,500 organizations were known to have been impacted as at October 25, 2023, with more than 80 percent of those organizations being US-based. By August 2024, Emsisoft estimated that 2,773 organizations had been affected and that the records of nearly 96 million people had been exposed.

== Response ==
Cybersecurity and Infrastructure Security Agency (CISA), CrowdStrike, Mandiant, Microsoft, Huntress and Rapid7 have assisted with incident response and ongoing investigations. Cyber industry experts have credited the MOVEit team for its response and handling of the incident by quickly providing patches In general, patches for the flaw were rapidly used.

On October 2, 2023, the Securities and Exchange Commission (SEC) subpoenaed Progress Software for documents and information about the vulnerability as part of a fact-finding inquiry. In August 2024, Progress said the SEC had concluded the inquiry and did not intend to recommend enforcement action against the company at that time.
