= Public Inquiry into Anti-Alberta Energy Campaigns =

Alberta security investigation

Public Inquiry into Anti-Alberta Energy Campaigns was a $3.5-million inquiry led by Steve Allan, commissioned on July 4, 2019, by newly-elected Alberta Premier Jason Kenney and tasked with investigating foreign-funded efforts to undermine the oil and gas industry.

Premier Kenney, whose United Conservative Party (UCP) had won a majority of seats in the 2019 Alberta general election, announced the creation of the Canadian Energy Centre (CEC), a Calgary-based, $30-million 'war room' to "fight misinformation related to oil and gas," on the same day as the creation of the inquiry—to fulfill election campaign promises. The Public Inquiry into Anti-Alberta Energy Campaigns would include interviews, research, and potentially, public hearings.

On July 23, 2021, the Globe and Mail published an article covering a leaked draft of the Alberta Inquiry final report. They stated the inquiry had ultimately found there was “nothing improper about the environmental campaigns it was ostensibly investigating.” Nutritionist Vivian Krause reacted with shock and tried to distance herself from her own research, for which she was paid CA$40,000.

In his final 657-page report—submitted to the Energy Minister on July 30, 2021, and was released to the public on October 21, 2021—Commissioner Allan found that no individual or organization had done anything illegal in their anti-Alberta resource development activities, and that they had exercised their right to free speech. Of the $54.1-million devoted to those activities from 2003 to 2019, Allan could not find a direct correlation to the decreased investment in Alberta's oil and gas industries and the environmental activists. He acknowledged that "natural market forces...supply, demand, global geopolitics, weather and technology, plus countless other factors" had contributed to the dramatic decline in the global price of oil and in investments.

== Final report ==
Commissioner Steve Allan submitted his 657-page final report to Alberta Energy Minister Sonya Savage on July 30. It was released to the public on October 21, 2021. In his report, Allan said of the environmental groups investigated by the inquiry, "No individual or organization, in my view, has done anything illegal. Indeed, they have exercised their rights of free speech." He found that the environmental groups did not "spread misinformation".

From 2003 to 2019, foreign funding of approximately $925-million flowed into Canadian charities which was used for "environmental initiatives". Of these, about $54.1-million went to "anti-Alberta resource development activity, which represents an average of $3.5 million a year. Allan acknowledged that the reduced investment in Alberta's oil and gas sector coincided with the dramatic drop in global oil prices in 2014 and was therefore due to "natural market forces", "supply, demand, global geopolitics, weather and technology, plus countless other factors." He said that "While anti-Alberta energy campaigns may have played a role in the cancellation of some oil and gas developments", [he was] not in a position to find that these campaigns alone caused project delays or cancellations."

The United Conservative Party provincial government in Alberta has allocated approximately $30 million annually to fund its Canadian Energy Centre, which was launched in December 2019 to fulfill Premier Jason Kenney's campaign promise before the 2019 Alberta general election to challenge "energy industry critics' inaccuracies". The "war room" was intended to be part of his "national and international advocacy" including a "fully staffed rapid response war room in government to quickly and effectively rebut every lie told by the green left about our world-class energy industry." The inquiry report said that charities that supported the bitumen-rich sands—"conservative/market-oriented charities"—received an estimated $26.7 million from foreign sources from 2003 through 2019.

=== Report recommendations ===
According to the Edmonton Journal, Commissioner Allan recommended that the Alberta government, "update transparency standards for non-profits and charities, engage in dialogue with First Nations communities to explore economic development opportunities", "work to re-brand Canadian energy with a strategy "built on a vision of being a global leader in lower carbon energy and climate solutions", and "better report greenhouse gas emissions in Alberta."

=== Response by Energy Minister Sonya Savage ===
Energy Minister presented her response on YouTube on October 21, 2021. Savage said that the "threshold to prove misinformation was too high, and therefore not specifically mentioned in the report."

== Background ==
Alberta Premier Jason Kenny's commissioned the Public Inquiry into Anti-Alberta Energy Campaigns on July 4, 2019, with a mandate to investigate foreign-funded efforts to undermine the oil and gas industry. A forensic accountant—Steve Allan—was named as commissioner of the inquiry.

Kenney had announced the creation of the public inquiry along with the "Energy War Room" in a release by the UCP party during his election campaign. He cited "the intrepid reporting of journalist Vivian Krause," who has spent ten years examining foreign funding of Canadian environmental non-profit organizations (ENGOs).

In the press release, Kenney said that the inquiry may follow up on investigations done in other jurisdictions, including "the January 6, 2017 Backgrounder for the United States investigation, "Assessing Russian Activities and Intentions in Recent US Elections" that contained, "clear evidence that the Kremlin is financing and choreographing anti-fracking propaganda in the United States." He could also include evidence from the March 1, 2018, House Committee on Science, Space, and Technology report, "Russian Attempts to Influence U.S. Domestic Energy Markets by Exploiting Social Media" from the House Committee on Science, Space, and Technology", which states, "the Kremlin manipulated various groups in an attempt to carry out its geopolitical agenda, particularly with respect to domestic energy policy." Premier Kenney says that "foreign-funded efforts" are undermining Alberta's oil and gas sector. The backgrounder said that RT ran "anti-fracking programming, highlighting environmental issues and the impacts on public health."

In a talk at Manhattan Institute on September 12, 2018, "The Real Fuel of the Future: Natural Gas", Kenney said that there were "domestic economic benefits from an expanded shale gas industry," but there was a "potential American upset of the former hegemony in global gas trade." In 2018 the media was "preoccupied" with Russian social-media meddling in the 2016 U.S. presidential election. In 2018 Russia attempted to "sow discord in our domestic energy debates". The March 1, 2018, House Committee on Science, Space, and Technology report, "Russian Attempts to Influence U.S. Domestic Energy Markets by Exploiting Social Media" from the House Committee on Science, Space, and Technology" said that over "4,000 social-media accounts linked to Russian entities were engaged in inflaming online debates over pipelines, fossil fuels, and climate change". Kenney said that these "fake accounts advocated for 'the complete abandonment of specific fuel sources, such as fossil fuels, by touting exaggerated claims about alternative energy sources,' while sometimes both promoting and mocking climate change, all intended to “generate further domestic [U.S.] controversy."

== Commissioner Steve Allan ==
Minister Schweitzer appointed a forensic accountant, Steve Allan, as commissioner of the Public Inquiry, which is tasked with investigating foreign-funded efforts to undermine the oil and gas industry.

=== Conflict of interest claim denied ===
In November 2019, CBC News reported that Allan, and "two other business associates" had supported and/or campaigned for Schweitzer in 2018 and 2019, and that Allan had awarded sole-source contracts for them after he was appointed to the $290,000 job as Commissioner. In response to a request for an investigation into a violation of Alberta's Conflicts of Interest Act, in July 2020, Alberta's ethics commissioner Marguerite Trussler found that Minister Schweitzer did not breach the Act when he appointed Allan. Trussler ruled that "Just because Mr. Allan made political donations to Minister Schweitzer in the past does not make the subsequent appointment of Mr. Allan as inquiry commissioner a private interest for the minister."

=== Sole-source $905,000 Dentons LLP contract ===
In July 2019, shortly after his appointment as chair of the Public Inquiry, Allan had awarded a $905,000 sole-source contract for the inquiry to the Calgary law firm, Dentons Canada LLP, where he was a former partner, and where, Toby Allen, Allan's son is a "partner and his good friend, Quincy Smith, also works", according to the Canadian Press (CP), and other media sources. In her ruling Trussler said, "It does stretch credibility that Mr. Allan did not consider whether or not there may possibly be a conflict of interest in his engaging of Dentons as counsel for the inquiry, given that, for all intents and purposes, the firm gave him free office space and both his close friend (although that alone is not significant) and his son were partners at the firm...[However], [n]either the minister, his children, nor his direct associates had any personal or particular interest in, or anything to gain from, the appointment of Mr. Allan as inquiry commissioner".

== Inquiry participants ==
By January 17, 2021, only eleven of the 47 individuals and groups that Commissioner Allan had invited to participate with commentary, had "applied and were granted standing". University of Calgary assistant law professor, Martin Olszynski, was granted standing in the Allan Inquiry. Olszynski and Shaun Fluker, also from the University of Calgary's Faculty of Law, had raised concerns about the Alberta Inquiry "from the perspective of the rule of law and procedural fairness." Their colleagues said that the inquiry could unjustifiably violate the "freedom of expression of the Canadian organizations it is aimed at as well as those associated with such organizations, including their members and supporters."

== Allen Inquiry commissioned reports and reading list (January 2021) ==
The eleven Allen Inquiry participants were provided with a "package of documents to review" that was also publicly available online. This included three reports funded and commissioned by the Public Inquiry and two 2020 books by well-known climate change denialists—Bjørn Lomborg's False Alarm: How Climate Change Costs Us Trillions, Hurts the Poor, and Fails to Fix the Climate and Michael Shellenberger's Apocalypse Never: Why Environmental Alarmism Hurts Us All.

The commissioned readings paid for by the inquiry include a $27,840 133-page report by Tammy Lynn Nemeth—the "Nemeth Report", a $50,000 report entitled "Foreign Funding Targeting Canada's Energy Sector" by Energy in Depth—a project from the Independent Petroleum Association of America, and a $6,125 background paper—the "Cooper Report" by Barry Cooper, a University of Calgary political scientist professor and key member of the Friends of Science. Nemeth, who is currently a "home-school teacher" in England a historian who completed her MA in Alberta and her PhD at the University of British Columbia, said there has been a "comprehensive international assault on Alberta's and Canada's energy industry" by groups that promote "various Green New Deals around the world". Using the "media and the youth", these entities are pushing through a "cultural shift"—a new global paradigm"—also known as the "Great Transition", "Great Transformation”, and "Global Phase Shift". This, Nemeth says, will "fundamentally transform the western industrial capitalist economic system" and "our modern way of life." Nemeth says that progressives ..."abhors Alberta and the hydrocarbon industry" and "relishes the idea of their demise." Nemeth is critical of the way in which the Canadian federal government, academics, NGOs—and the foundations that fund them—use the "rationale of climate change" to nurture this "new global paradigm".

On January 14, 2021, Olszynski posted his submission online—"Textbook Climate Denialism." In a January 15 interview, Olszynski said that Alberta has been "caught in the crosshairs of a legitimate international effort to mitigate the worst effects of climate change...If climate change isn't real, then clearly Albertan can feel aggrieved, (or that) they've been targeted unfairly…. (punished) for their way of life, for their culture, their values. But if climate change is legitimate, and I suggest that it is, then none of that is true." He compared the efforts by Alberta to respond to the "growing body of evidence surrounding climate change" to that of the tobacco industry's response to the growing body of research on the "harmful effects of tobacco". University of Alberta's Andrew Leach—an energy and environmental economist, Martin Olszynski, who assisted in preparing his Inquiry submission, told Global News that it was "almost mind-boggling" that "[n]one of the reports" in the package provided by the Allan inquiry, "had the rigour" or the "level of analysis and input" that "you would expect"...It's just a very strange piece of the process." Leach said that it is not surprising that environmental groups would oppose the "development of Alberta's vast fossil fuel resources."

By January 15, in response to criticisms that the three commissioned reports were "based on junk science", Alan Boras a spokesman for the Allan Inquiry, said that these commissioned "reports do not represent findings or positions taken by the inquiry, but are intended to gather a broad range of opinions." Boras clarified that the commission inquiry does not "consider the science of climate change" or the "existence or status of climate change" to be part of its mandate, and that Commissioner Allan does not " intend to make any findings of fact respecting climate science in his final report". The inquiry focus is "really about foreign funds coming into Canada to obstruct oil and gas development."

According to CBC, "[i]ndependent experts have excoriated the reports for being based on junk climate-denial science, bizarre conspiracy theories and oil-industry propaganda."

Greenpeace, an organization that was mentioned 87 times in the three reports funded by the Allan Inquiry, has threatened legal action. The Nemeth report, that was funded and commissioned by the inquiry, had quoted The Spectator columnist, James Delingpole—known for his promotion of conspiracy theories such as the Great Reset—saying that this current generation of Greenpeace and the environmental movement, represent a "new breed of zealots less interested in saving Planet Earth than in destroying the capitalist system." Delingpole—and by extension Nemeth—says environmental non-governmental organizations (ENGOs) are the "foot soldiers" of the so-called transnational progressivism movement, which according to Nemeth, are overseen by the United Nations, the World Economic Forum (WEF), and national leaders like Prime Minister Justin Trudeau, among others. Nemeth—and Delingpole—say, without evidence, that they are using the pretext of climate change and COVID-19 to undermine market-based western capitalism. Nemeth included Delingpole's statement that Greenpeace was like a watermelon, green on the outside and red—socialist—on the inside. CBC reported that Greenpeace's lawyer had sent a letter to the Allan inquiry on January 18, saying that they would "take appropriate measures." Alberta's inquiry act, provides environmental groups with a "procedural right to address any adverse findings before they are made public by the inquiry". By publishing these reports, the Allan inquiry has not "followed due process." They cannot use this report as an "opportunity to smear people they don't agree with, that is not the kind of thing you should be doing in a public inquiry." University of Calgary law professor, Nigel Bankes, said that Greenpeace's case was strong based on both "procedural unfairness" in the Alberta's inquiries act, and legal precedent from the 1997 Westray Mine explosion public inquiry and the 1997 Royal Commission of Inquiry on the Blood System in Canada.

== Deadlines ==
On June 25, Minister Savage announced that the deadline for the Public Inquiry's final report was extended to October 30, 2020, from July 2 and that the inquiry's budget has been increased from $2.5 million to $3.5 million. The added funds will be diverted from the Canadian Energy Centre's budget.

At the end of October, UCP cabinet statement, Alberta Energy Minister Sonya Savage granted a 3-month extension for the Allan Inquiry's final report with a new deadline of January 31, 2021. The extension, which comes without any additional funding will "ensure that potential participants have a fair opportunity to provide input." The "procedural delay" was caused by COVID-19-related restrictions.

A January 29, 2021 UCP cabinet statement granted Commissioner Allan four more months, its third deadline extension "to ensure he is able to complete a comprehensive investigation into a possible well-funded foreign campaign aimed at discrediting the province's energy sector." The commission's final report "into whether foreign money is bankrolling campaigns to besmirch the reputation of Alberta oil and gas products" is due on May 31, 2021. The commission's budget of $3.5M is unchanged.

== Ecojustice Canada Society v Alberta ==
In September 2019, Vancouver-based Ecojustice issued a letter of warning of potential legal challenge to commissioner Allan asking for a response within 30 days. Ecojustice is saying that changes must be made to the mandate of the Public Inquiry into Anti-Alberta Energy Campaigns. According to The Globe and Mail, "environmental and activist groups are mobilizing against the public inquiry". Ecojustice says the "inquiry is unlawful and possibly unconstitutional because of the language used in the mandate" given to commissioner Steve Allan. Ecojustice said the inquiry labels "environmental groups critical of oil and gas development as 'anti-Alberta.'"

In November Ecojustice requested that the Court of Queen's Bench of Alberta investigate whether the reasons for the inquiry fulfilled the requirements under the Public Inquiries Act. Ecojustice alleged that the inquiry was "politically motivated, biased and outside provincial jurisdiction".

On July 27, 2020, Ecojustice requested that the Court of Queen's Bench of Alberta stop the Public Inquiry into Anti-Alberta Energy Campaigns until the court gave its ruling on their November judicial review application.

On November 21, 2019, Ecojustice lawyer, Devon Page, filed the lawsuit Ecojustice Canada Society v Alberta in the Court of Queen's Bench of Alberta in Calgary calling on the court have the inquiry's "work paused until there is a ruling on its case". While the "factual premise" underlying the inquiry have been "seriously challenged several times", the lawsuit is the "first challenge to its legality." The Ecojustice "lawsuit also alleges that inquiry commissioner Steve Allan was a donor to the UCP leadership campaign of Doug Schweitzer, now Alberta’s justice minister, who appointed him to the job."

On November 26, 2020, Court of Queen's Bench Justice Karen Horner dismissed Ecojustice's application for an injunction to pause the Inquiry partly because of the "strong public interest in ensuring the orderly, uninterrupted, and timely progression of the Inquiry." (Note: The Ecojustice attorney was Barry Robinson, Doreen Mueller, Q.C. and Peter Bujis represented Alberta's Attorney General and David Wachowich represented J. Stephens Allan.) Judge Horner said that since the inquiry was in its second phase at the end of November 2020, and that in that phase the inquiry would be "contacting organizations of interest in order to solicit their response" and that by November 26, the inquiry had not published any "finding of misconduct" on Ecojustice's part, there was therefore "no evidence that the Inquiry contains unfounded and untested allegations against Ecojustice" harmful to its reputation. Ecojustice CEO, Devon Page, said that they would continue to challenge inquiry activities and "expose it for the sham that it is."
