= Rollbase =

Platform as a service software solution

Infinite Blue Platform (previously Rollbase)
- Industry: Cloud computing, platform as a service
- Founded: 2007
- Fate: Acquired by Infinite Blue in 2019
- Successor: Progress Rollbase
- Headquarters: Collegeville, Pennsylvania
- Key people: Frank Shultz (CEO & President)
- Products: SaaS web-based business applications
- Parent: Infinite Blue
- Website: www.infinitecloud.com

Infinite Blue Platform, (previously Rollbase) is a platform as a service (PaaS) software solution. It was founded by the eponymous software vendor based in Saratoga, California and previously owned by Progress Software (Nasdaq: PRGS) in June 2013. In May 2019, Rollbase was acquired by BC in the Cloud, a business continuity and disaster recovery application company, who then formed the new company Infinite Blue, as they expanded their offerings.

Founded in 2007, the Rollbase platform allows users to create Software as a Service (SaaS) business applications using point and click, drag and drop tools in a standard web browser with minimal programming.

== Product ==
Rollbase provides software vendors, ISVs, and organizations with a multitenant software as a service platform to use as the foundation for SaaS application development and delivery. It serves business users, IT professionals, and Web developers.
