= Canadian Energy Centre =

Alberta provincial corporation to counter criticism of the fossil fuel industry

- Canadian Energy Centre Limited
- Abbreviation: CEC
- Nickname: "Energy War Room"
- Formation: 11 December 2019; 6 years ago
- Founder: Government of Alberta
- Dissolved: June 11, 2024; 2 years ago
- Type: Provincial corporation (Note: The Canadian Energy Centre is incorporated as a provincial corporation under the Financial Administration Act. Therefore, while the CEC receives government funding and its board of directors consists of Alberta cabinet ministers, it is exempt from the Freedom of Information and Protection of Privacy Act. According to a statement by Jason Kenney's press secretary, the CEC "is still subject to PIPA (Personal Information Protection Act), Alberta's Public Interest Disclosure (Whistleblower Protection) Act and to audit by the auditor general.")
- Headquarters: Calgary, Alberta
- Board of directors: Sonya Savage; Doug Schweitzer; Jason Nixon
- Key people: Tom Olsen, CEO
- Budget: CA$30,000,000
- Website: canadianenergycentre.ca

The Canadian Energy Centre Limited (CEC), also commonly called the "Energy War Room", was an Alberta provincial corporation mandated to promote Alberta's energy industry and rebut "domestic and foreign-funded campaigns against Canada's oil and gas industry".

The creation of an organization to promote Alberta's oil and gas industries was a campaign promise by United Conservative Party leader Jason Kenney during the 2019 Alberta general election. After winning a majority of seats in the election, Kenney's government inaugurated the CEC with a $2.84 million budget in December 2019. The CEC originally had an annual budget of CA$30 million which was decreased to $CA12 million. The CEC has been the subject of several controversies since its establishment, including accusations of plagiarizing logo designs. The CEC attracted widespread media attention when it launched a campaign against the Netflix animated children's movie Bigfoot Family because it cast Alberta's oil and gas industry in a negative light. In June 2024, the CEC was shut down, and merged into Alberta Intergovernmental Relations.

== Background ==
The creation of a 'war room' capable of challenging "energy industry critics' inaccuracies" was an election promise made by then candidate Jason Kenney as part of his campaign leading up to the 16 April 2019 Alberta general election. In the founding speech of the UCP on 9 May 2018, Kenney announced that he would engage in "national and international advocacy" including a "fully staffed rapid response war room in government to quickly and effectively rebut every lie told by the green left about our world-class energy industry. If companies like HSBC decide to boycott our oil sands, our government will boycott them. It's called a market decision." Premier Kenney, whose United Conservative Party (UCP), won a majority of seats in the Alberta Legislature announced the creation of Calgary-based $30 million "Energy War Room" on 7 June 2019 to "fight misinformation related to oil and gas".

On 6 May 2019 Nick Koolsbergen, who was the UCP's Alberta campaign manager for the winning election, announced the establishment of the Wellington Advocacy government relations firm with Harper & Associates' Rachel Curran. Both Koolsbergen and Curran had worked in the office of former Prime Minister Stephen Harper. According to a 17 May 2019 CBC article, Postmedia contracted Wellington Advocacy to "lobby" the UCP on "how it could be involved with" the new 'energy war room'.

In July 2019, Kenney announced the establishment of a one-year $2.5 million Public Inquiry into Anti-Alberta Energy Campaigns". Kenney cited the work of Vivian Krause, who has spent ten years examining foreign funding of Canadian environmental non-profit organizations (ENGOs) and who claimed that Alberta's interests were being "challenged by well-funded foreign actors who have been waging a decade-long campaign to land lock Alberta's oil." The public inquiry, which was officially established in July 2019 with a "mandate to investigate foreign-funded efforts", is led by the former board chair of the Calgary Economic Development—a forensic accountant—Steve Allan. The inquiry will include interviews, research, and potentially, public hearings.

On 9 October 2019 Energy Minister Sonya Savage announced that the CEC was incorporated.

The centre (CEC) was officially launched on 11 December by Premier Kenney at a press conference at the Southern Alberta Institute of Technology (SAIT).

== Mandate and description ==
Its mandate is to "highlight achievements in Alberta's oil and gas sector" and to "refute what it deems to be misinformation about the industry." Kenney said the centre will "counter misinformation" "coming from some environmental groups and others seeking to landlock Alberta's oil and gas".

At the 11 December launch, Olsen described the centre as a place to tell the story of the oil and gas industry in Alberta, which includes rebutting its critics respectfully. While explaining the war room's strategy, Olsen states "we are not about attacking, we are about disproving true facts."

=== Funding ===
The Canadian Energy Centre is funded by the Alberta provincial government with an original budget of $30 million. During the COVID-19 pandemic, the Canadian Energy Centre's budget was decreased to $2.84 million for a period of 90 days. In 2020, CEC's budget was about $4 million.

Post Media's Financial Post described the CEC as an "Alberta government corporation partly funded by industry." According to a March 2022 CBC article, the CEC is funded by the Technology, Innovation and Emissions Reduction (TIER) fund, which is the province's industrial tax on carbon tax.

On 21 March 2022, Minister Savage, who is CEC's "sole voting shareholder", said that the CEC—although not included in the province's proposed budget for 2022-2023—has a budget of approximately $12 million a year.

=== Private corporation ===
The Canadian Energy Centre Limited is a private corporation, which means that it is not subject to Alberta's Freedom of Information and Protection of Privacy Act (FOIP Act). Premier Kenney's press secretary Christine Myatt said that keeping CECL's internal operations secret is a "tactical and/or strategic advantage to the very foreign-funded special interests the CEC is looking to counter."

CBC's Jennie Russell submitted a request in May 2021, for further information on how CEC awarded its contracts. The request was denied because CEC is protected from any FOI request due to its status as a private corporation. Russell challenged the decision and the case was sent to Alberta's information and privacy commissioner, who appointed an external adjudicator, Catherine Tully, to decide on the issue. Tully found that the CEC did not qualify as either a provincial government office or branch and therefore Russell's FOI did not apply. University of Victoria's Sean Holman, an expert on freedom of information laws, said that the way in which CEC uses information and spends money is of public interest, as it is not a "run-of-the-mill government operation", it is a "spin centre" for the world's "most controversial industry".

== Governance ==
The CEC is governed by a three-member board of directors composed of Sonya Savage (Minister of Energy), Doug Schweitzer (Minister of Justice and Solicitor General), and Jason Nixon (Minister of Environment and Parks).

The appointment of Tom Olsen as the Canadian Energy Centre's first chief executive officer and managing director was announced in November 2019 by Savage. Olsen, who had run unsuccessfully as a United Conservative Party candidate in the 2019 election, is a former veteran political journalist who previously worked as a spokesman for Ed Stelmach.

== Themes ==
In a 18 December rebuttal to the 14 December Medicine Hat News critical opinion piece that said that the CEC was not "subject to freedom-of-information searches" and that the Centre "could be used to stifle legitimate dissent and commentary on the oil and gas industry", Olson, who is a former Calgary Herald journalist, said that "oversight" of the CEC is "rigorous" and that the centre is subject to the Fiscal Planning and Transparency Act, the Whistle Blowers Act and audits by Alberta's auditor general. Olsen added that "campaigns to shut down new pipeline projects and damage the reputation of our oil and gas industry have received tens of millions of dollars from U.S. environmental foundations." This has resulted in the "landlocking of Alberta energy" which had resulted in the loss of jobs, "tens of billions of dollars" in capital, less money for public services, as well as "lower value for their shareholders that include many of the country’s biggest pension plans and investment funds."

In his CEC post, Grady Semmens responded to the 27 December 2019 opinion piece published in The Globe and Mail by Bill McKibben, an American author and environmentalist, who called on Canada to go beyond cutting emissions to "stop digging up oil and gas and selling it around the world." Semmens said that Canada was only "responsible for less than 1.6 per cent of global greenhouse gas emissions." Semmens cited a Canadian Association of Petroleum Producers (CAPP) which cited a 9 January 2007 Statistics Canada report. Economist Andrew Leach, who described the centre as a "pro-energy corporation", is providing a rebuttal of truth claims made by the CEC on their website.

== Canadian Energy Centre Logo ==
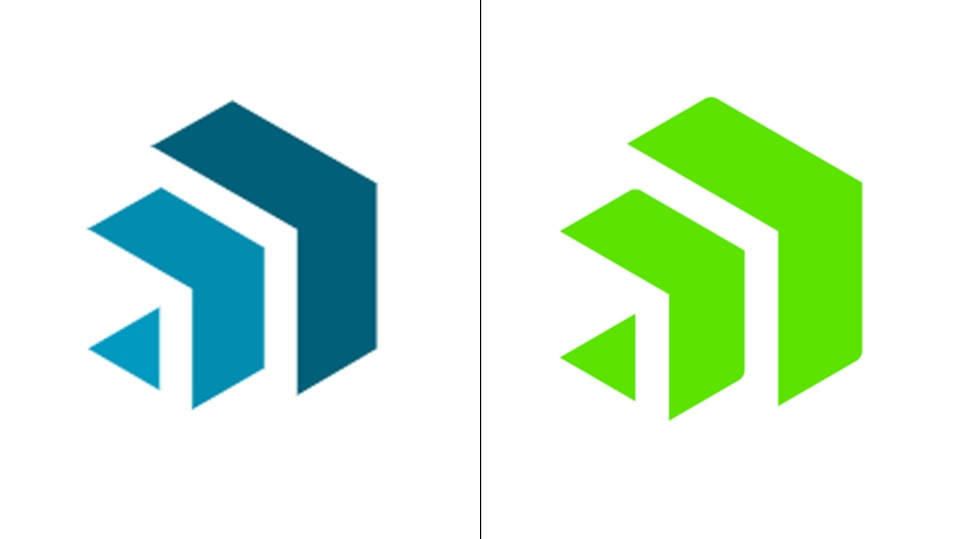
Comparison of the former Canadian Energy Centre logo (left) and the Progress Software logo (right)

The CEC logo, which was unveiled at the launch, was also used in the 11 December promotional video, on the CEC's website, "on the wall of its downtown Calgary office, and on signs". By the evening of 18 December, "social media users" on Twitter began to share side-by-side versions of the CEC logo and the "trademarked symbol" for Progress Software Corporation, the Massachusetts-headquartered "software giant"—Progress Software, A 19 December Canadian Press report said that the icons were "identical, stylized sharp-angled depictions of what appear to be radiating waves... the Progress one is emerald-green and the war room version is two shades of blue." According to a CP report, the Massachusetts-headquartered "software giant"—Progress Software sent an email that morning saying that it was "looking into whether Alberta’s new energy war room has violated the company's trademarked logo."

In a 19 December statement, the energy centre's CEO and managing director, Tom Olsen, said that the logo was pulled and was to be replaced. Olsen said that the "design debacle" "mistake" was an "unfortunate situation". He said that the CEC was in "discussions" with the marketing agency—Lead & Anchor "to determine how it happened". The CEC had selected Lead & Anchor over eight other contractors proposed to the CEC by the Calgary marketing agency, Communo.

On 27 December, the Calgary Herald reported that Pasadena, California-based ATK Technologies Inc.—a company that developed the mobile phone Alpha Browser app launched in 2018—claimed that the logo the CEC was using to replace its original logo, was "similar" to the Alpha Browser app logo—a "stylized, red-striped letter "a." The new CEC logo appears to take that same letter "a" and turn it on its side, with a red maple leaf added to the top right corner." According to the Herald a member of ATK said that the logo was ATK's "intellectual property" and that they their legal team was "on top of it."

Currently the Canadian Energy Centre's Facebook, Twitter and Websites are not using either of these logos. The image being used where needed is simply their name in simple black text.

== Bigfoot Family Controversy ==
On 12 March 2021 the Canadian Energy Centre launched a website and petition against the Netflix animated children's movie Bigfoot Family. The website hosted an online petition titled "Tell the truth Netflix" addressed to Netflix Canada's Head of Communications. The form letter, which could not be edited by users, asked Netflix to use its "powerful platform to tell the true story of Canada’s peerless oil and gas industry, and not contribute to misinformation targeting your youngest, most vulnerable and impressionable viewers." Of particular concern was the animated film's representation of "oil being extracted by blowing up a valley using glowing red bombs" which, the CEC claimed, looked "like something out of an action movie". Of note, there have been experimental projects where oil has been extracted using explosives. One such project - Project Oilsand - was proposed for Pony Creek, Alberta but was never followed through with. On 12 March 2021 when Canadian Energy Centre CEO Tom Olsen was asked why the Bigfoot Family campaign was launched, the CEC released a statement saying it responded after "a parent flagged" the film. However a 17 March 2021 column in the Calgary Herald states that the idea for the campaign came from a CEC member of staff.

The Bigfoot Family controversy—also known as Bigfootgate—has received provincial, national as well as international media attention in the US, UK and elsewhere. In Alberta, opposition MLAs have used the pointed to the Bigfoot controversy to question the value and effectiveness of the Canadian Energy Centre which has a budget of $12 million for 2021–2022. Meanwhile, Jason Kenney has publicly defended the CEC's campaign against Bigfoot Family saying that the film was deliberately designed to "defame in the most vicious way possible, in the impressionable minds of kids, the largest industry in the province".

== Twitter account ==
On 12 February 2020, Tom Olsen, CEC's CEO Tom Olsen apologized for "the tone" of tweets posted by CEC's official Twitter account "attacking" The New York Times. CEC's Twitter account—@CDNEnergyCentre—had posted a 20-tweet thread on 12 February in response to an article in The New York Times by Christopher Flavelle, in which Flavelle describing how some of the "largest financial institutions" in the world had stopped investing in Alberta's oil sands. Flavelle said that the oil sands was "one of the world's most extensive, and also dirtiest, oil reserves." The Times said that in June 2017, when Sweden's largest pension fund—AP7—divested of six companies that they said "breached" the 2016 Paris Agreement, it began a shift in the "campaign against the oil sands...to the world of finance". Since then, HSBC—Europe's largest bank, the insurance "giant"—The Hartford, the central bank of Sweden, and "one of BlackRock's "fast-growing green-oriented funds, France's BNP Paribas and Société Générale, and Norway's sovereign wealth fund, also announced their divestment from pipelines, the oil sands and/or fossil fuels, according to the Times. The tweet thread, the CEC account said that the Times had "been "called out for anti-Semitism countless times," has a "dodgy" track record, is "routinely accused of bias" and is "not the most dependable source."" The tweets were since deleted and Olsen, said that "The tone did not meet CEC's standard for public discourse. This issue has been dealt with internally."

On 11 February, CEC's social media manager apologized for retweeting "factually incorrect information" about how clean Teck Frontier's oil would be compared to other North American oil streams, after Andrew Leach, a University of Alberta economist pointed out the error.

== See also ==
- Canadian Centre for Energy Information (CCEI), a Canadian federal government website and portal that was announced on 23 May 2019. The Canadian Energy Information Portal was launched by Statistics Canada, in partnership with Natural Resources Canada, Environment and Climate Change Canada, and the—now defunct—National Energy Board. The regularly updated and expanded online interactive site provides a "single point" for accessing information Canadian energy sector including energy production, consumption, international trade, transportation, prices with monthly federal and provincial statistics.
