= List of Standard Networks products =

This list of Standard Networks products includes all major standalone services and programs created by Standard Networks, a Madison, Wisconsin-based software company founded in 1989 and acquired by Ipswitch, Inc. in 2008. All products listed are well into their gold releases. This list also includes previous products that are no longer being actively developed.

== Client Applications ==
=== Secure File Transfer ===
Product	Summary
MOVEit Buddy	GUI FTP/S client for Windows. (Retired.)
MOVEit EZ	Automated client (through scheduling) that securely transfers files to and from MOVEit DMZ servers using HTTPS.
MOVEit Central	Enterprise file transfer engine. Multi-threaded automated client (through scheduling and events) that securely transfers files to and from FTP, SSH, FTPS, mail, AS1, AS2, AS3, MOVEit DMZ and Windows servers. Also performs automated OpenPGP and SMIME encryption. Includes tamper-evident transfer and administration log.
MOVEit Freely	Free, command-line FTP/S client for Windows.
MOVEit Xfer	Free, command-line client that securely transfers files to and from MOVEit DMZ servers using HTTPS.

=== Terminal Emulation ===
Product	Summary
Emu	Windows-based, TCP/IP-based GUI mainframe terminal emulator. Optional ActiveX/COM programming component.

== Server Applications ==
=== Secure File Transfer ===
Product	Summary
MOVEit DMZ	Internet-facing secure file transfer and secure messaging server. Supports HTTPS, FTPS, SFTP, AS2 and AS3; automatically encrypts all files and messages at rest. Includes tamper-evident transfer and administration log.
Hosted MOVEit DMZ Service	MOVEit DMZ services hosted by Standard Networks. (a.k.a. "M1")

== Previous Projects ==
Product	Summary
Unigate	32-bit, DOS-based TCP/IP and poll-select front-end device for Unisys mainframe computers.
Open IT	Windows-based TCP/IP and poll-select front-end device for Unisys mainframe computers.
HEAT (also "Intragate")	Windows-based web-to-mainframe-terminal scripting environment and supporting authoring tools.
ActiveHEAT	Windows-based mainframe-terminal ActiveHEAT/COM object.
