= Frank Bruseker =

Canadian politician

MLA for Calgary North West
- In office 1989–1997
- Preceded by: Stan Cassin
- Succeeded by: Greg Melchin

Personal details
- Born: June 3, 1954 (age 71) Edmonton, Alberta
- Party: Alberta Liberal Party

Frank Bruseker (born June 3, 1954) is a former provincial level politician and current union leader from Alberta, Canada.

== Political career ==
Bruseker was elected to the Legislative Assembly of Alberta in the 1989 Alberta general election. He defeated Progressive Conservative incumbent Stan Cassin to pick up the Calgary North West electoral district for the Liberals. The election was remarkable because in the previous election the Liberal candidate in the riding finished last; 7000 new voters came out to vote for Bruseker; and the vote for Cassin remained almost unchanged from the previous election. Bruseker was re-elected in the 1993 Alberta general election. He defeated Progressive Conservative challenger Harley Torgerson by a few hundred votes to keep his seat. Bruseker was defeated in his bid for a third term by Progressive Conservative Greg Melchin who won the riding by 3000 votes.

After leaving politics Bruseker became president of the Alberta Teachers' Association. During his three terms as president of the Alberta Teachers' Association, his greatest accomplishment was the negotiation of five-year agreement with the government of Alberta, the longest agreement in the educational sector prior to this date. This contract resulted in the elimination of the $2.1 billion unfunded liability of the Alberta Teachers' Retirement Fund; in the pegging of salary increases for teachers from 2007 to 2012 to the Alberta Average Weekly Earnings index as calculated by Statistics Canada; and in five years of labour peace in the provincial education sector.
