= WS FTP =

File Transfer Protocol client

WS_FTP
- Developer: Ipswitch, Inc. (Now part of Progress Software)
- Initial release: 1993
- Stable release: WS_FTP Professional 12.9; WS_FTP Server 2022.07 (8.8.7) / June 14, 2023 for client, April 24, 2024 for server
- Operating system: Microsoft Windows
- Available in: English
- Website: WS_FTP Site

WinSock File Transfer Protocol, or WS_FTP, is a secure file transfer software package produced by Ipswitch, Inc. Ipswitch is a Massachusetts-based software producer established in 1991 that focuses on networking and file sharing. WS_FTP consists of an FTP server and an FTP client and has over 40 million users worldwide.

In 2019, Ipswitch Inc was acquired by Progress Software Corporation, who is the current owner of the product.

== History ==
John A. Junod, a decorated Army master sergeant, developed WS_FTP in 1993. WS_FTP was originally released as Shareware. The rights were sold to Ipswitch in 1996, when Junod retired from the Army and joined Ipswitch.

== Overview ==
File Transfer Protocols are used to transfer large files. FTP clients add stability and encryption options over traditional FTP transfers. The WS_FTP client has a "classic" GUI with two panes, one showing the local computer and the other accessing the remote host, though newer versions of the software have updated interfaces, including a web browser interface. The WS_FTP secure server encrypts files using SSL/FTPS, SSH, or SCP2 and HTTPS transfers. It is self-contained, eliminating the need for an external database. WS_FTP's additional built-in capabilities include email client integration, alerts and notifications, server failover, and transfer scheduling.
