= Stan Cassin =

Canadian politician

MLA for Calgary North West
- In office 1986–1989
- Preceded by: Sheila Embury
- Succeeded by: Frank Bruseker

Personal details
- Born: February 19, 1935 (age 91) Corunna, Ontario
- Party: Progressive Conservative Association of Alberta

Stan Cassin (born February 19, 1935) was a provincial politician in Alberta, Canada.

== Political career ==
Cassin was elected to the Legislative Assembly of Alberta from the Calgary North West electoral district in the 1986 Alberta general election as the Progressive Conservative candidate, winning in a landslide. Cassin ran for a second term in the 1989 Alberta general election but was defeated by Frank Bruseker of the Liberals. He lost by almost 500 votes after receiving almost 800 fewer votes than in the previous election.
