= Canadian Centre for Energy Information =

Canadian federal government website

The Canadian Centre for Energy Information (CCEI) is a Canadian federal government website and portal that was announced on May 23, 2019.

The Canadian Energy Information Portal was launched by Statistics Canada, in partnership with Natural Resources Canada, Environment and Climate Change Canada, and the Canada Energy Regulator. The regularly updated and expanded online interactive site provides a "single point" for accessing information Canadian energy sector including energy production, consumption, international trade, transportation, prices with monthly federal and provincial statistics.

According to their website, the portal "supports Statistics Canada's shift toward a more collaborative model to ensure Canadians have access to a broad range of statistics." Funds were allocated in the 2019 Canadian federal budget for "increased access to comparable, consolidated energy data through the creation of a virtual data centre combining information from across federal, provincial and territorial organizations." The federal government's Canadian Centre for Energy Information will be developed using content from the Canadian Energy Information Portal.

== Historical CCEI ==
The name—Canadian Centre for Energy Information (CCEI)—was previously used by a now-defunct Canadian Association of Petroleum Producers (CAPP)'s in-house information centre, that was established in 2002. The Calgary-based Petroleum Communication Foundation (PCF), which was in existence from 1975 until December 31, 2002, fulfilled a similar mandate to that of the CCEI of creating "awareness and understanding of how the Canadian petroleum industry operated." When CAPP's CCEI was established in 2002, PCF was merged into the new organization. CAPP no longer used the CCEI after 2013. Over the years, the PCF and the CCEI published seven editions of Robert Bott's Our petroleum challenge: into the 21st century under various titles. (Note: The first and third editions were entitled Our Petroleum challenge. The fourth edition was entitled Our petroleum challenge in the 1990s. The title of the fifth edition was Our petroleum challenge into the 21st century.)

== See also ==
- Canadian Energy Centre also known as Canadian Energy Centre Limited (CECL), a $30 million dollar pro-industry Calgary, Alberta-based corporation, established on December 11, 2019, by the Alberta government to improve Alberta's oil and gas reputation and to rebut and rebuke criticism of the fossil fuel industry.
- Energy Information Administration American counterpart
