= Andrew Leach (economist) =

Canadian energy and environmental economist

- Citizenship: Canadian

Academic background
- Education: B.Sc. (Environmental Sciences) and M.A. (Economics) University of Guelph; Ph.D. Queen's University
- Alma mater: University of Guelph; Queen's University

Andrew Leach is a Canadian energy and environmental economist and a contributing writer to a number of Canadian news outlets including The Globe and Mail, and Maclean's. His research areas span energy and environmental economics—including topics such as oil sands regulation, clean energy innovations, with a specific focus on climate change policies.

== Education ==
After completing his Bachelor of Science (B.Sc.) degree in Environmental Sciences and his M.A. (Economics) from University of Guelph, he earned his Ph.D. in economics from Queen's University.

== Early career ==
On completion of his Ph.D. at Queens University, Leach was appointed as an assistant professor at HEC Montreal, a post he held for three years. He moved to the University of Alberta in 2006.

== Career ==
Leach is Professor of Economics and Law at the University of Alberta where he teaches courses in environmental and energy economics, environmental law and utilities law. In 2012–2013, on a leave from the University of Alberta as Visiting Scholar, Leach spent a year at Environment Canada working on "greenhouse gas policy for the oil and gas sector."

Leach was Chair of Alberta's Climate Change Leadership Panel in 2015.

== Academic research ==
His primary academic research interests include climate change policy, energy policy including oil sands regulation and innovations and policies related to clean energy. He has "consulted for Environment Canada, the National Roundtable on the Environment and the Economy (NRTEE), the Auditor General of Alberta, Alberta Environment, Alberta Finance and Enterprise, and Alberta Energy."

== Policies ==
=== Emissions policies and pricing ===
In his review of the 2011 policy proposals of then NDP leadership candidate, Thomas Mulcair's plan to combat climate change, Leach said that Mulcair's plan to cap GHG emissions was not broad enough, as it placed too much emphasis on industrial polluters and did not adequately account for [[Life-cycle greenhouse gas emissions of energy sources|life cycle emissions]] or "downstream emissions" associated with fossil fuels used to heat buildings, propel cars and trucks, and run tractors." "GHG emissions are not as concentrated among large, industrial sources as most people think." He said that "agriculture (74Mt/yr), buildings (80Mt/yr), transportation (164Mt/yr), and waste (54Mt/yr) account[ed] for over half of Canadian GHGs". He added that the "industrial emissions associated with the production of electricity (126 Mt) and oil and gas (153 Mt)" produced for "domestic consumption, not exports."

== In the mass media ==
Leach is a contributing writer for Maclean's and The Globe and Mail.

The Economist cited Leach's statistics in its January 1, 2011 article "Muck and brass: Canada's tar sands", which compared statements from a number of environmentalists, academics, and oil industry players, including the Canadian Association of Petroleum Producers (CAPP). CAPP said that by 2011, the oil sands generated only 5% of Canada's CO_{2} which at that time represented about 0.1% of the world total. Leach said that the oils sands "create about C$500 of value-added per tonne of CO_{2}, against C$20-30 from coal-fired power stations."

In a June 26, 2015 Edmonton Journal article, Leach was described as a "respected", "media-savvy" and "data-driven" energy and environmental economist—known for his "environmental pragmaticism"— whose understanding of the energy industry was greater than that of "many senior execs in the oilpatch." The article said that Leach "knows how much additional cost the industry can bear to curb emissions without rendering it uncompetitive." The NDP Alberta provincial government recruited "Leach to help steer the province’s new climate change strategy" in 2015. Leach calls for a "level playing field that discourages more emissions, no matter where they come from" but does not "demonize" the oil sands. In an interview with Gary Lamphier in March 2015, Leach said that Alberta's energy industry "has to get its head out of the oilsands or pay the price for inaction...If we believe the economy we have only exists because we can pollute without paying for it, or without compensating for the damages that creates, that's a real problem." Leach believes that the imposition of environmental regulations is necessary. Leach said that while carbon pricing is "probably the most cost effective way to achieve a particular outcome", it has limitations. Leach says that carbon pricing is not necessarily and unconditionally going to "achieve a better outcome" than with regulation or cap and trade. Leach says that a "credible emissions reduction plan" that includes all the elements of Alberta's "new fiscal regime, from taxes to royalties to carbon levies" for the oil sands is necessary in order to "secure new markets" and major investments for "big players' in Alberta's oil industry.

=== 2019 federal election: comparing climate plans ===
From July through October 2019, the CBC series entitled "Election 2019: A national reckoning on climate change" consisted of five articles by Leach in which he compared the climate plans proposed by federal parties running in the 2019 Canadian federal election—the Green Party, led by Elizabeth May, the Conservative Party, led by Andrew Scheer, the New Democratic Party, led by Jagmeet Singh, the Liberal Party led by the incumbent Prime Minister Justin Trudeau, with the final summary on October 10.

Leach co-authored an October 4, 2019 Chatelaine article with the United Nations Intergovernmental Panel on Climate Change (IPCC) scientist Katherine Hayhoe, comparing the four federal parties.

== Calgary Energy Centre ==
Leach reviews articles posted on line by the "pro-energy corporation", the Calgary-based Canadian Energy Centre, which is funded by the government of Alberta.

== Personal life ==
Leach is married and has two children. He is active on his energy and climate blog entitled "Rescuing the frog" and on Twitter.
