= Calgary-North East =

Provincial electoral district in Alberta, Canada

Coordinates: 51.15°N 114.01°W

Alberta electoral district
- Calgary-North East within the City of Calgary (2017 boundaries).

Provincial electoral district
- Legislature: Legislative Assembly of Alberta
MLA
Gurinder Brar
New Democratic
- District created: 1957
- District abolished: 1959
- District re-created: 2017
- First contested: 1959, 2015
- Last contested: 1959, 2023

Demographics
- Population (2016): 40,366
- Area (km²): 66.5
- Pop. density (per km²): 607

Calgary-North East (previously styled Calgary North East) is a provincial electoral district in Calgary, Alberta. The riding has existed twice, having been contested in the 1959 and abolished soon after, becoming Calgary East. It was re-established in time for the 2019 general election in the Legislative Assembly of Alberta.

== Boundary history ==
The historic 1959 redistribution of the provincial ridings of Calgary and Edmonton marked the transition back to First Past the Post. From 1921 to 1959 Calgary and Edmonton, along with a few other ridings in the province elected members with Single Transferable Vote. The redistribution created seven ridings in Calgary, two of those still exist today.

This transition was done in part to standardize the electoral system across the province and because Calgary and Edmonton were becoming too large to be a single riding. The other six ridings were Calgary Bowness, Calgary West, Calgary Glenmore, Calgary Centre, Calgary South East, Calgary North.

However, the riding was abolished after only one term, becoming Calgary-East. It was re-established by the 2017 Electoral Boundaries Commission, created from parts of Calgary-Mackay-Nose Hill and Calgary-McCall, and was contested in the 2019 Alberta general election, however the new riding shares no territory in common with the original riding, as it's located entirely north of the 1950s city limits.

== Representation history ==
Members of the Legislative Assembly for Calgary-North East
Assembly	Years	Member	Party
See Calgary 1921-1959
14th	1959–1963	Albert Ludwig	Social Credit
See Calgary-East after 1963
See Calgary-Mackay-Nose Hill, Calgary-Northern Hills, and Calgary-McCall before 2019
30th	2019–2023	Rajan Sawhney	United Conservative
31st	2023–	Gurinder Brar	New Democratic

Calgary North East was represented by Social Credit MLA Albert Ludwig for the one term it was active. He went on to represent Calgary-East and Calgary-Mountain View after it was abolished.

In 2018 and 2019, the re-created Calgary-North East saw nomination controversies for both the governing New Democrats and opposition United Conservatives, with allegations of ballot-stuffing and non-residents voting in the contests. United Conservative candidate Rajan Sawhney was elected as Calgary-North East's second representative, and appointed as Minister of Community and Social Services.

== Election results ==
=== 2023 ===
2023 Alberta general election
Party	Candidate	Votes	%	±%
New Democratic	Gurinder Brar	11,117	55.05	+19.43
United Conservative	Inder Grewal	9,078	44.95	-4.39
Total		20,195	99.28	–
Rejected and declined		147	0.72	
Turnout		20,342	56.37	
Eligible electors		35,457		
New Democratic gain from United Conservative		Swing		+11.91
Source(s) Source: Elections Alberta

=== 2010s ===
2019 Alberta general election
Party	Candidate	Votes	%	±%
United Conservative	Rajan Sawhney	8,376	49.35	-2.97
New Democratic	Gurbachan Brar	6,046	35.62	-2.88
Alberta Party	Nate Pike	1,791	10.55	-
Liberal	Gul Khan	761	4.48	-3.31
Total valid votes		16,974	99.39	
Rejected, spoiled, and declined		105	0.61	
Turnout		17,079	62.42	
Eligible voters		27,362		
United Conservative notional hold		Swing		-0.05

2015 Alberta general election redistributed results
New Democratic	4,086	38.50
Progressive Conservative	2,797	26.35
Wildrose	2,756	25.97
Liberal	827	7.79
Independent	146	1.38
Green	2	0.02
Source(s) Source: Ridingbuilder

=== 1950s ===
1959 Alberta general election
Party	Candidate	Votes	%
Social Credit	Albert Ludwig	5,945	64.24
Progressive Conservative	Melvin Stronach	1,829	19.76
Liberal	E. Kitch Elton	1,060	11.45
Co-operative Commonwealth	Jack Hampson	420	4.54
Total valid votes		9,254	100.00
Registered voters / Turnout		16,961	54.56
Social Credit pickup new district.			

== See also ==
- List of Alberta provincial electoral districts
- Canadian provincial electoral districts
- Calgary Northeast, former federal electoral district
