= Greg Melchin =

Canadian politician

The Honourable Greg Melchin ECA

MLA for Calgary North West
- In office 1997–2008
- Preceded by: Frank Bruseker
- Succeeded by: Lindsay Blackett

Personal details
- Born: 14 December 1953 (age 72) Raymond, Alberta
- Party: Progressive Conservative Association of Alberta

Gregory Knowles Melchin ECA (born 14 December 1953) is a politician and accountant who formerly served as a member of the Legislative Assembly of Alberta and Cabinet Minister in the Alberta government.

== Early life ==
Melchin was born in Raymond, Alberta. He has lived in Northwest Calgary for most of his life.

He graduated from James Fowler High School and went to Brigham Young University, obtaining a bachelor of science degree in 1977. In 1980, Melchin received his C.A. designation from the Institute of Chartered Accountants of Alberta. Melchin is a member of the Church of Jesus Christ of Latter-day Saints.

== Political career ==
Melchin was first elected to the Legislative Assembly of Alberta in the 1997 Alberta general election. He defeated incumbent Liberal Frank Bruseker in a hotly contested election.

In the 2001 Alberta general election he was re-elected to his second term in a landslide increasing his plurality by 6000 votes, winning over 10,000 more than the second place candidate. He was appointed to his first portfolio in the Alberta government as Minister of Revenue.

He was re-elected to his third term in the 2004 Alberta general election and was appointed by Premier Ralph Klein to be the Minister of Energy.

Melchin was appointed Minister of Seniors and Community Supports after Ed Stelmach became premier.

On 8 September 2007, Melchin announced he would not seek re-election in the next provincial election.
