= Sheila Embury =

Canadian nurse and politician

MLA for Calgary-North West
- In office 1979–1986
- Preceded by: District established
- Succeeded by: Stan Cassin

Personal details
- Born: June 6, 1931 Calgary, Alberta
- Died: August 1, 2005 (aged 74) Calgary, Alberta
- Party: Progressive Conservative Association of Alberta

Sheila Barbara Embury (June 6, 1931 – August 1, 2005) was a former nurse and provincial level politician from Alberta, Canada.

== Early life ==
Sheila Barbara Pease was born on June 6, 1931. She graduated from the University of Alberta with a nurses degree in 1971.

Sheila was married to David Embury who came west from Ontario to work for Shell Canada.

They lived in Saskatchewan and Alberta settling in Calgary in 1969.

Sheila had two children. Lynn and James (Jim).

She was elected for two terms as a Progressive Conservative in the Alberta legislature.

Following her retirement from politics Sheila served on various government boards.

== Political career ==
Embury was elected to the Legislative Assembly of Alberta after winning the new Calgary North West electoral district in the 1979 Alberta general election. She picked up the riding for the Progressive Conservatives winning handily over Social Credit candidate Harold Gunderson. Embury ran for a second term in office in the 1982 Alberta general election. She won re-election in a landslide winning a margin of almost 10,000 votes over the second place challenger.

During her time in office she served on the Members’ Services; Private Bills; Privileges and Elections, Standing Orders and Printing; Public Accounts; and Public Affairs and the Select Special Committee to Examine the Role of Upper House in Canadian Federal System.

In 2000 Sheila was diagnosed with multiple myeloma cancer which she died from on August 1, 2005.

Legislative Assembly of Alberta
Preceded by New District	MLA Calgary North West; 1979–1986	Succeeded by Stan Cassin
