= Ipswitch, Inc. =

American IT management software developer

Coordinates: 42°28′5.4″N 71°15′44.3″W

- Type: Private
- Industry: Application and network monitoring, Information security, Managed file transfer
- Founded: 1991
- Fate: Acquired by Progress Software
- Headquarters: Burlington, MA, United States
- Key people: Michael Grossi, CEO; Kevin Bisson, CFO
- Products: iMacros; IMail Server; Log Management Suite; MessageWay; MOVEit; WhatsUp Gold; WS_FTP
- Owner: Progress Software
- Number of employees: 202 (as of December 31, 2019)
- Parent: Progress Software
- Website: ipswitch.com

Ipswitch is an IT management software developer for small and medium sized businesses. The company was founded in 1991 and is headquartered in Burlington, Massachusetts and has operations in Atlanta (Alpharetta) and Augusta, Georgia, American Fork, Utah, Madison, Wisconsin and Galway, Ireland. Ipswitch sells its products directly, as well as through distributors, resellers and OEMs in the United States, Canada, Latin America, Europe and the Pacific Rim. Since 2019, Ipswitch is part of Progress Software.

== History ==
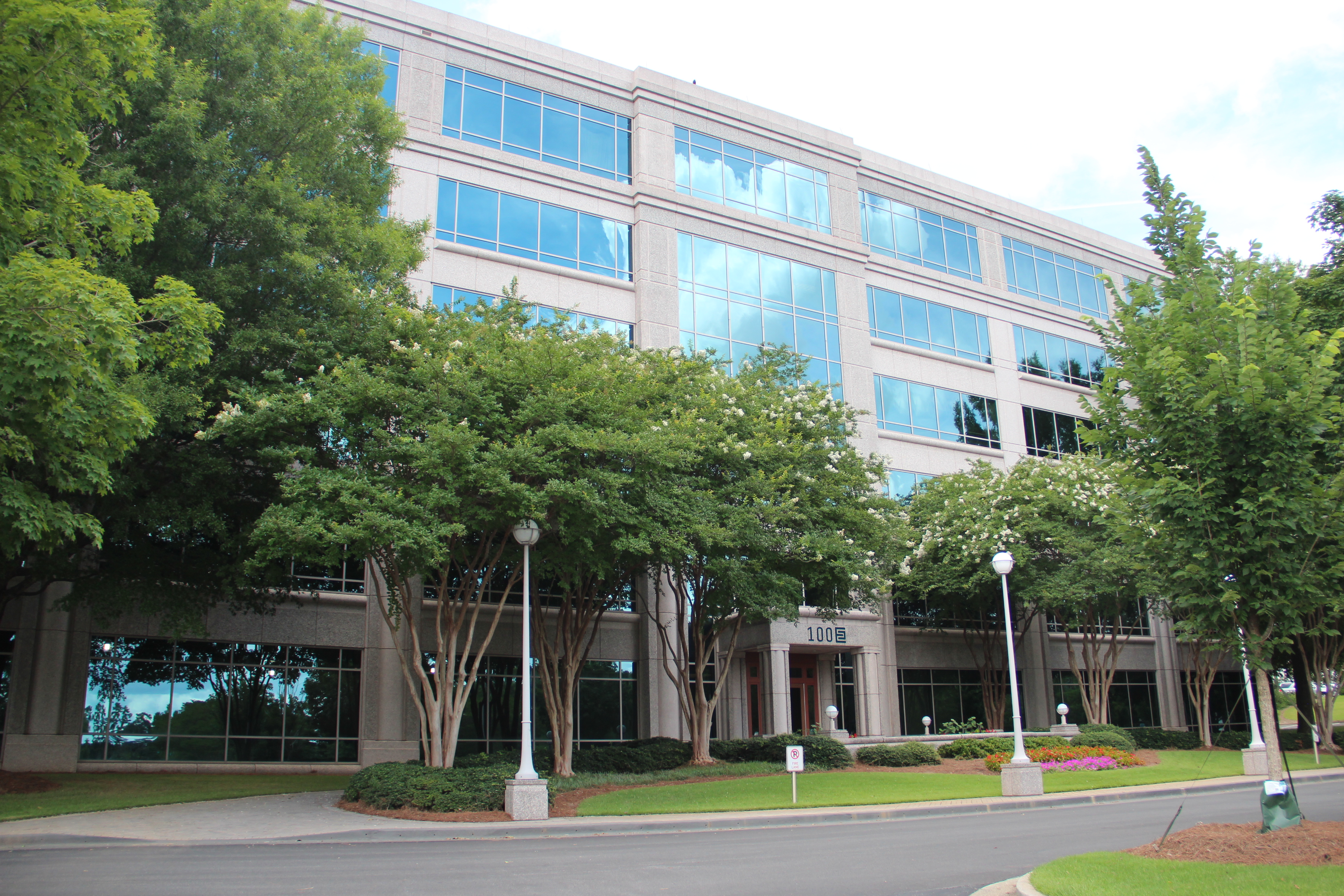
Ipswitch's offices in Alpharetta, Georgia

Roger Greene founded Ipswitch in 1991 out of his apartment without any venture capital funding or bank financing. The company became profitable in its second year. The first product Ipswitch produced was a gateway that allowed the Novell Inc. IPX networking protocol to connect with the Internet Protocol. In 1994, Ipswitch launched the IMail server, the first product available on the e-commerce site, Open Market. In the mid-1990s, the company was a value-added reseller of the Spyglass Mosaic browser. In 1996, the company released the beta version of WhatsUp Gold, a commercial version of an earlier shareware product, WS_Ping, as well as purchasing the rights to WS_FTP.

In 2008, Ipswitch acquired the Wisconsin-based software producer Standard Networks Inc. and its product MOVEit. Shortly after the acquisition, Ipswitch split its operations into three divisions, secure file transfers, network management, and messaging and collaboration. The company acquired Salt Lake City-based Hourglass Technologies in 2009. The following year, the company acquired the compliance system and system log analysis software producer, Dorian Software. In December 2012, Ipswitch acquired the Waldorf, Germany-based performance testing company iOpus known for its product, iMacros, a web-browser extension. In 2015, Ipswitch merged its network monitoring and file transfer divisions and created the PartnerSynergy program. Ipswitch opened a support and operations center in Galway, Ireland in March 2016. On 28 March 2019, Ipswitch signed an agreement with Progress Software Corporation, whereby Progress will acquire Ipswitch. The completion of the purchase for $225 million was announced by Progress on May 1, 2019.

== Philanthropy ==
The company commits 5 percent of its profits to a variety of community investment programs, designed to support the interests of its employees. In 2010, through a partnership with Trees for Life International, they planted over 5,000 trees, one for each download of the company's WhatsUp Gold Engineer's Toolkit.

== See also ==
- List of Standard Networks products, Standard Networks was acquired by Ipswitch in 2008
