= Lindsay Blackett =

Canadian politician

The Honourable Lindsay Blackett ECA
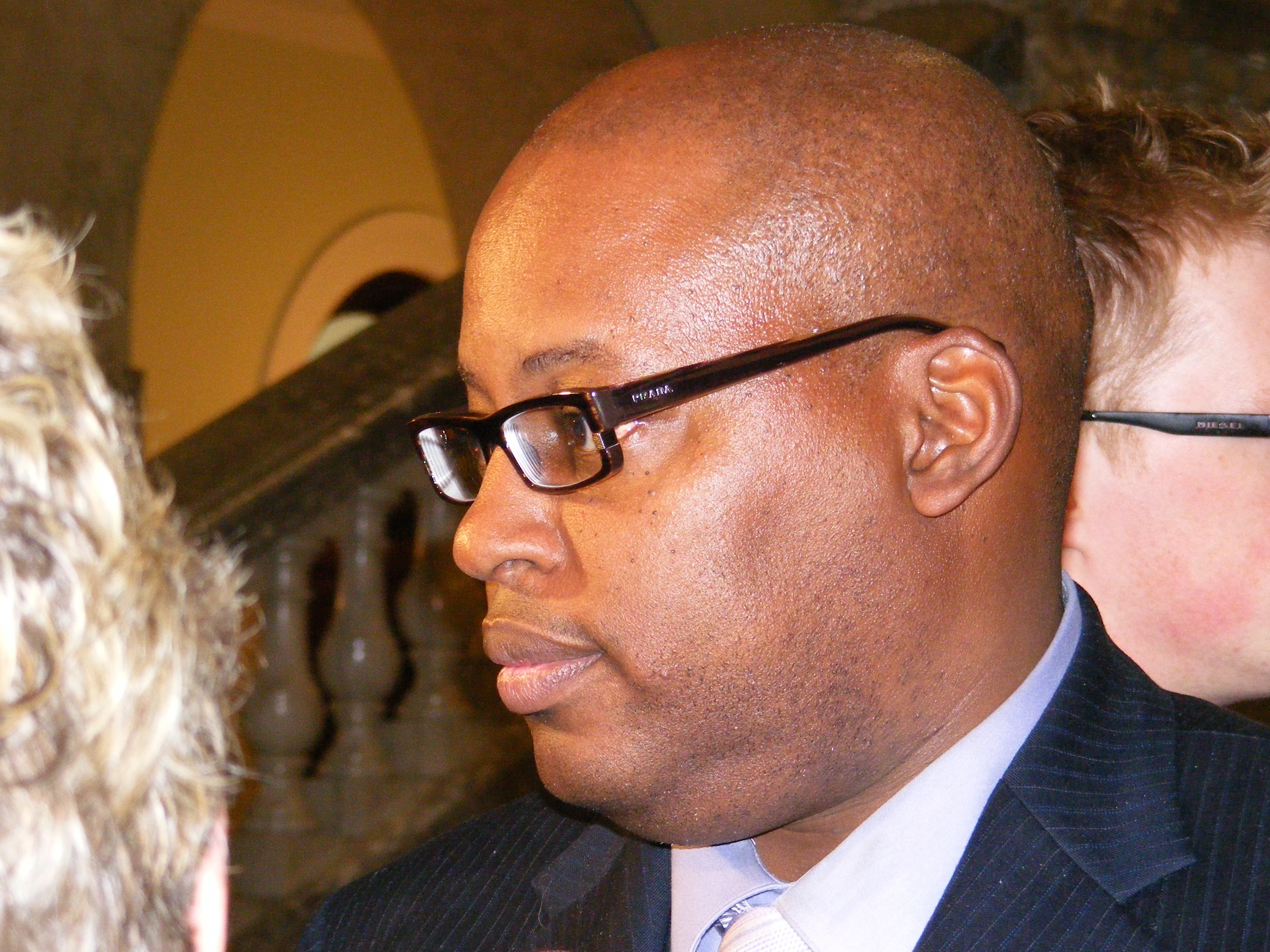

MLA for Calgary-North West
- In office 2008–2012
- Preceded by: Greg Melchin
- Succeeded by: Sandra Jansen

Minister of Culture and Community Spirit in the Alberta government
- In office March 12, 2008 – October 12, 2011
- Preceded by: Hector Goudreau
- Succeeded by: Heather Klimchuk

Personal details
- Born: February 8, 1961 (age 65) Oxford, England
- Party: Progressive Conservative
- Spouse: Jennifer
- Occupation: technical sales representative

Lindsay Blackett ECA (born February 8, 1961) is a Canadian politician and was a Member of the Legislative Assembly of Alberta, representing the constituency of Calgary-North West as a Progressive Conservative.

== Early life ==
Blackett was born February 8, 1961, in Oxford, England. He studied criminology and corrections at Ottawa's Carleton University from 1979 to 1983 but did not graduate. Prior to his election as the MLA for Calgary-North West, Blackett worked as a Technical Sales Representative, providing Original Equipment Manufacturer (OEM) electronic component hardware and design.

== Political career ==
Blackett has been involved in politics in varying capacities for many years. He has held the positions of Provincial Progressive Conservative Constituency Association Director for Calgary-West and Calgary-North West, President and vice-president of the Ottawa-Centre Federal Progressive Conservative Association, President of the Ottawa-Centre Federal Progressive Conservative Youth Association, Youth Convention Coordinator for the Progressive Conservative Party of Canada's 1986 Annual General Meeting, and Special Assistant in the Prime Minister of Canada's Office.

Blackett first sought public office in the 2008 provincial election in the constituency of Calgary-North West. In that election, he received 46% of the vote.

On March 12, 2008, Blackett was appointed by the Premier as the Minister of Culture and Community Spirit.

On June 14, 2010, Blackett spoke to a panel of people from the television industry at the Banff World Television Festival. He said, "I sit here as a government representative for film and television in the province of Alberta, and I look at what we produce, and if we're honest with ourselves … I look at it and say, 'Why do I produce so much shit? Why do I fund so much crap?'" His criticism was widely publicized. There were complaints about his choice of words, and also, since Blackett's portfolio includes responsibility for culture, opposition MLAs and others called for his resignation. Blackett apologized for his language but not the sentiment.

== Personal life ==
Blackett is married to Jennifer and the couple has two children. He is an active community volunteer. In addition to his political volunteerism, Blackett has served as Director of the Tuscany Community Association, President of the Canadian Progress Club (which raises $500,000 annually for Big Brothers and Big Sisters and other charities that serve Calgary's less fortunate), Volunteer Coordinator for Henry Burris All-Star Weekend, Big Brother volunteer, and coach for both soccer and hockey.

== Election results ==
2008 Alberta general election results ( Calgary-North West )		Turnout 45.4%	
Affiliation	Candidate	Votes	%
Progressive Conservative	Lindsay Blackett	8415	46%
Wildrose Alliance	Chris Jukes	2712	15%
Liberal	Dale D'Silva	5552	30%
Green	George Read	902	5%
NDP	Collin Anderson	637	3%
Total		18218	100%
