= Progress Software =

American software company

- Formerly: Data Language Corporation
- Type: Public
- Traded as: Nasdaq: PRGS; S&P 600 Component
- Industry: Computer software
- Founded: 1981; 45 years ago
- Founder: Charles Ziering; Clyde Kessel; Joseph Alsop; Mary Székely
- Headquarters: Burlington, Massachusetts, U.S.
- Key people: Yogesh Gupta (president & CEO)
- Revenue: ▲US$978 million (2025)
- Net income: ▲US$73.1 million (2025)
- Number of employees: 2,815
- Subsidiaries: Ipswitch (as of May 1, 2019)
- Website: www.progress.com

Progress Software Corporation is an American public company that produces software for creating and deploying business applications. It is founded in Burlington, Massachusetts, and has offices in 16 countries as of 2024.

== History ==
Progress Software was co-founded by several MIT graduates, including Joseph W. Alsop, Clyde Kessel, and Chip Ziering in 1981. It was originally called Data Language Corporation.

In 1984, Data Language released its first commercial version of the PROGRESS ADE for Unix and the following year unveiled a version for MS-DOS. In 1987, the company had released PROGRESS software for computer networks and the VAX/VMS (a Digital Equipment platform) and CTOS/BTOS operating systems. At the same year, the company changed its name to Progress Software Corporation to reflect the name of its software.

== Products ==
Some of the company's products include:

- Kemp LoadMaster - Load Balancer
- Flowmon - Network monitoring system
- Opsmith - Devops automation
- Chef - Devops automation
- Telerik
  - Kendo UI - UI tools for .NET development.
  - Test Studio - software test automation tool – test automation.
  - SiteFinity - Content Management System
  - Fiddler - Web debugging proxy tool
- OpenEdge - Application Development – platform for building business applications and database management system.
- ShareFile
- Automate MFT
- MOVEit
- WS_FTP
- MarkLogic
- Data Platform
- Agentic RAG
- Semaphore
- DataDirect
- Corticon
- Podio
- Domo

== Data breaches ==
In 2023, a security vulnerability in Progress-owned file transfer software MOVEit was exploited in a data breach affecting various companies and government organizations. A running total maintained by cybersecurity company Emsisoft showed that more than 2,500 organizations were known to have been impacted as of October 25, 2023 with more than 80 percent of those organizations being US-based. The cybercriminal organization Clop was alleged to have been partially responsible for the attacks, and claimed responsibility for breaches of 1st Source, the BBC, British Airways, the New York City Department of Education, Putnam Investments, and Shell among others.
