= Calgary-North West =

Provincial electoral district in Alberta, Canada

Coordinates: 51.13°N 114.24°W

Alberta electoral district
- Calgary-North West within the City of Calgary, 2017 boundaries

Provincial electoral district
- Legislature: Legislative Assembly of Alberta
MLA
Rajan Sawhney
United Conservative
- District created: 1979
- First contested: 1979
- Last contested: 2023

Calgary-North West is a provincial electoral district in Calgary, Alberta, Canada. The district was created in 1979 and is mandated to return a single member to the Legislative Assembly of Alberta.

== History ==
The electoral district was created in the 1979 boundary redistribution from the electoral district of Calgary-Foothills and a portion of old electoral district of Banff that had been annexed by new city of Calgary boundaries.

The riding was split in half in the 2010 boundary redistribution as land on the east side became part of Calgary-Hawkwood. The south boundary also picked up some land from Calgary-Bow and the riding was extended west into land that belonged to Foothills-Rocky View where the city of Calgary had annexed land.

=== Boundary history ===
20 Calgary-North West 2003 boundaries
Bordering districts
North	East	West	South
Calgary-Foothills	Calgary-Varsity	Foothills-Rocky View	Calgary-Bow
riding map goes here			
Legal description from the Statutes of Alberta 2003, Electoral Divisions Act.
Starting at the intersection of the west Calgary city boundary with 112 Avenue NW; then 1. east along 112 Avenue NW to Country Hills Boulevard NW; 2. southeast along Country Hills Boulevard NW to Sarcee Trail NW; 3. south along Sarcee Trail NW to Crowchild Trail NW; 4. northwest along Crowchild Trail NW to Nose Hill Drive NW; 5. south along Nose Hill Drive NW to Scenic Acres Boulevard NW; 6. west along Scenic Acres Boulevard NW to Scurfield Drive NW; 7. north, west and south along Scurfield Drive NW to Scenic Acres Link NW; 8. southwest along Scenic Acres Link NW to Stoney Trail NW; 9. south along Stoney Trail NW to the left bank of the Bow River; 10. west along the left bank of the Bow River to the west Calgary city boundary; 11. north along the west Calgary city boundary to the starting point.
Note:

22 Calgary-North West 2010 boundaries
Bordering districts
North	East	West	South
Calgary-Foothills	Calgary-Hawkwood	Chestermere-Rocky View	Calgary-Bow
Legal description from the Statutes of Alberta 2010, Electoral Divisions Act.

=== Representation history ===
Members of the Legislative Assembly for Calgary-North West
Assembly	Years	Member	Party
Riding created from Calgary-Foothills and Banff-Cochrane
19th	1979–1982	Sheila Embury	Progressive; Conservative
20th	1982–1986	Sheila Embury	Progressive; Conservative
21st	1986–1989	Stan Cassin	Progressive; Conservative
22nd	1989–1993	Frank Bruseker	Liberal
23rd	1993–1997	Frank Bruseker	Liberal
24th	1997–2001	Greg Melchin	Progressive; Conservative
25th	2001–2004	Greg Melchin	Progressive; Conservative
26th	2004–2008	Greg Melchin	Progressive; Conservative
27th	2008–2012	Lindsay Blackett	Progressive; Conservative
28th	2012–2015	Sandra Jansen	Progressive; Conservative
29th	2015–2016	Sandra Jansen	Progressive; Conservative
29th	2016–2019	Sandra Jansen	New Democratic
30th	2019–2023	Sonya Savage	United Conservative
31st	2023–	Rajan Sawhney	United Conservative

The electoral district was created in the 1979 boundary redistribution out of the Calgary-Foothills riding. Prior to the creation of the district the area returned Progressive Conservative MLAs in Foothills since 1971.

The election held that year returned Progressive Conservative candidate Sheila Embury with a very large majority. She was re-elected in 1982 election almost doubling her popular vote. Embury retired from the legislature at dissolution in 1986.

The electors of Calgary-North West chose the second representative of the riding in the 1986 election. Progressive Conservative candidate Stan Cassin held the district for his party with a reduced majority, but still won a landslide.

The district would see its first hotly contested race in the 1989 election as Liberal candidate Frank Bruseker surged in popularity gaining over 6,000 votes under the Liberal banner compared to 1986 Liberal candidate Dean Biollo. Cassin would go down to defeat after only one term in office.

Bruseker would run for a second term in 1993. His plurality would be reduced as he hang on to win over Harley Torgerson. The 1997 election would be Bruseker's last. Despite gaining in popular vote he was defeated by Progressive Conservative candidate Greg Melchin.

Melchin would run for a second term in the 2001 general election. He would win a massive majority taking over 15,000 votes and running ahead of the second place candidate by over 11,000 votes. After the election he was appointed to his first cabinet portfolio as Minister of Revenue by Premier Ralph Klein. In 2004 he ran for his third term in office. He lost over half his popular vote from 2001 and was shuffled to be the Minister of Energy.

The 2008 election would see the riding pick its fifth representative. Melchin retired at dissolution in 2008 leaving the riding open. The electors returned Lindsay Blackett who held the district for the Progressive Conservative Party. He was appointed by Premier Ed Stelmach as Minister of Culture and Community Spirit after the election in 2008.

== Legislative election results ==
=== 1979 ===
1979 Alberta general election results		Turnout 62.67%		Swing	
Affiliation	Candidate	Votes	%	Party	Personal
Progressive Conservative	Sheila Embury	5,976	61.67%		
Social Credit	Harold Gunderson	2,043	21.08%		
Liberal	George R. D. Goulet	950	9.80%		
New Democratic	Ken Richmond	721	7.45%		
Total		9,690			
Rejected, spoiled and declined		13			
Eligible electors / Turnout		15,484	%		

=== 1982 ===
1982 Alberta general election results		Turnout 67.33%		Swing	
Affiliation	Candidate	Votes	%	Party	Personal
Progressive Conservative	Sheila Embury	11,711	74.94%	13.27%	
Western Canada Concept	Walter Kostiuk	1,768	11.31%	*	
New Democratic	Floyd Johnson	1,745	11.17%	3.72%	
Social Credit	Leith McClure	404	2.58%	-18.50%	
Total		15,628			
Rejected, spoiled and declined		17			
Eligible electors / Turnout		23,236	%		
Progressive Conservative hold		Swing		12.29%	

=== 1986 ===
1986 Alberta general election results		Turnout 46.04%		Swing	
Affiliation	Candidate	Votes	%	Party	Personal
Progressive Conservative	Stan Cassin	7,775	62.53%	-12.41%	
New Democratic	Tom Schepens	3,376	27.15%	15.98%	
Liberal	Dean Biollo	1,284	10.32%	*	
Total		12,435			
Rejected, spoiled and declined		25			
Eligible electors / Turnout		27,061	%		
Progressive Conservative hold		Swing		14.20%	

=== 1989 ===
1989 Alberta general election results		Turnout 55.16%		Swing	
Affiliation	Candidate	Votes	%	Party	Personal
Liberal	Frank Bruseker	7,417	44.46%	34.14%	
Progressive Conservative	Stan Cassin	6,985	41.87%	-20.66%	
New Democratic	Kelly Hegg	2,281	13.67%	-13.48%	
Total		16,683			
Rejected, spoiled and declined		28			
Eligible electors / Turnout		30,294	%		
Liberal pickup from Progressive Conservative				Swing 27.40%	

=== 1993 ===
1993 Alberta general election results		Turnout 65.39%		Swing	
Affiliation	Candidate	Votes	%	Party	Personal
Liberal	Frank Bruseker	6,763	47.68%	3.22%	
Progressive Conservative	Harley Torgerson	6,443	45.42%	3.55%	
New Democratic	Paul Rasporich	495	3.49%	-10.18%	
Social Credit	David Grant	373	2.63%		
Natural Law	Paul Colver	110	0.78%	*	
Total		14,184			
Rejected, spoiled and declined		17			
Eligible electors / Turnout		21,717	%		
Liberal hold				Swing 3.39%	

=== 1997 ===
1997 Alberta general election results		Turnout 59.92%		Swing	
Affiliation	Candidate	Votes	%	Party	Personal
Progressive Conservative	Greg Melchin	9,190	53.24%	7.82%	
Liberal	Frank Bruseker	7,226	41.86%	5.82%	
Social Credit	Douglas Picken	503	2.92%	0.29%	
New Democratic	Jeff Pattinson	342	1.98%	-1.51%	
Total		17,261			
Rejected, spoiled and declined		18			
Eligible electors / Turnout		28,836	%		
Progressive Conservative gain from Liberal		Swing		6.82%	

=== 2001 ===
2001 Alberta general election results		Turnout 55.39%		Swing	
Affiliation	Candidate	Votes	%	Party	Personal
Progressive Conservative	Greg Melchin	15,292	71.49%	18.25%	
Liberal	Paul Allard	4,971	23.24%	-18.62%	
New Democratic	Patricia Alward	828	3.87%	1.89%	
Social Credit	Douglas Picken	299	1.40%	1.52%	
Total		21,390			
Rejected, spoiled and declined		69			
Eligible electors / Turnout		38,742	%		
Progressive Conservative hold		Swing		18.44%	

=== 2004 ===
2004 Alberta general election results		Turnout 43.41%		Swing	
Affiliation	Candidate	Votes	%	Party	Personal
Progressive Conservative	Greg Melchin	7,757	55.32%	-16.17%	
Liberal	Judy Stewart	4,489	32.01%	8.77%	
Green	Jeffery Krekoski	637	4.54%	*	
Alberta Alliance	Jenell Friesen	620	4.42%		
New Democratic	Bob Brunet	520	3.71%	-0.16%	
Total		14,023			
Rejected, spoiled and declined		86			
Eligible electors / Turnout		32,501	%		
Progressive Conservative hold		Swing		-12.47%	

=== 2008 ===
2008 Alberta general election results		Turnout 40.90%		Swing	
Affiliation	Candidate	Votes	%	Party	Personal
Progressive Conservative	Lindsay Blackett	8,415	46.21%	-9.11%	
Liberal	Dale D'Silva	5,552	30.49%	-1.52%	
Wildrose Alliance	Chris Jukes	2,703	14.84%	10.42%	
Green	George Read	902	4.95%	0.41%	*
New Democratic	Collin Anderson	637	3.50%	-0.21%	
Total		18,209			
Rejected, spoiled and declined		72			
Eligible electors / Turnout		44,695	%		
Progressive Conservative hold		Swing		-5.32%	

=== 2012 ===
2012 Alberta general election
Party	Candidate	Votes	%
Progressive Conservative	Sandra Jansen	7,683	51.76%
Wildrose	Chris Challis	5,454	36.74%
Liberal	Robert Prcic	992	6.68%
New Democratic	Brian Malkinson	471	3.17%
Evergreen	Bryan Hunt	140	0.94%
Alberta Party	Troy Millington	103	0.69%

=== 2015 ===
2015 Alberta general election
Party	Candidate	Votes	%
Progressive Conservative	Sandra Jansen	6,320	32.72
New Democratic	Karen Mills	5,724	29.63
Wildrose	Jeff Callaway	5,163	26.73
Alberta Party	Chris Blatch	1,176	6.09
Liberal	Neil Marion	935	4.84
Total valid votes		19,318	100.0
Rejected, spoiled and declined		127	
Turnout		19,445	57.3
Eligible voters		33,952	
Source: Elections Alberta

=== 2019 ===
2019 Alberta general election
Party	Candidate	Votes	%	±%
United Conservative	Sonya Savage	13,565	56.67	-2.77
New Democratic	Hafeez Chishti	7,611	31.80	+2.17
Alberta Party	Andrew Bradley	2,171	9.07	+2.98
Freedom Conservative	Cam Kham	262	1.09	
Liberal	Prerna Mahtani	258	1.08	-3.76
Independent	Roberta McDonald	69	0.29	
Total valid votes		23,936	99.06	
Rejected, spoiled and declined		228	0.94	+0.29
Turnout		24,164	71.95	
Eligible voters		33,584		
United Conservative notional hold		Swing		-2.47

=== 2023 ===
2023 Alberta general election
Party	Candidate	Votes	%	±%
United Conservative	Rajan Sawhney	11,921	48.31	-8.36
New Democratic	Michael Lisboa-Smith	11,778	47.73	+15.94
Alberta Party	Jenny Yeremiy	778	3.15	-5.92
Independent	Serena Thomsen	153	0.62	–
Solidarity Movement	Alain Habel	45	0.18	–
Total		24,675	99.41	–
Rejected and declined		147	0.59	
Turnout		24,822	70.15	
Eligible electors		35,386		
United Conservative hold		Swing		-12.15
Source(s) Source: Elections Alberta

== Senate nominee election results ==
=== 2004 ===
2004 Senate nominee election results: Calgary-North West				Turnout 44.78%	
Affiliation	Candidate	Votes	% votes	% ballots	Rank
Progressive Conservative	Bert Brown	5,600	16.80%	46.39%	1
Progressive Conservative	Jim Silye	5,009	15.02%	41.49%	5
Progressive Conservative	Betty Unger	4,801	14.40%	39.77%	2
Progressive Conservative	Cliff Breitkreuz	3,472	10.41%	28.76%	3
Progressive Conservative	David Usherwood	3,419	10.25%	28.32%	6
Independent	Link Byfield	3,157	9.47%	26.15%	4
Independent	Tom Sindlinger	2,324	6.97%	19.25%	9
Alberta Alliance	Vance Gough	2,012	6.03%	16.67%	8
Alberta Alliance	Michael Roth	1,871	5.61%	15.50%	7
Alberta Alliance	Gary Horan	1,679	5.04%	13.91%	10
Total votes		33,344	100%		
Total ballots		12,072	2.76 votes per ballot		
Rejected, spoiled and declined		2,481			

Voters had the option of selecting four candidates on the ballot

== Student vote results ==
=== 2004 ===
Participating schools
Ranchlands School

On November 19, 2004, a student vote was conducted at participating Alberta schools to parallel the 2004 Alberta general election results. The vote was designed to educate students and simulate the electoral process for persons who have not yet reached the legal majority. The vote was conducted in 80 of the 83 provincial electoral districts with students voting for actual election candidates. Schools with a large student body that reside in another electoral district had the option to vote for candidates outside of the electoral district then where they were physically located.

2004 Alberta student vote results
Affiliation	Candidate	Votes	%
Progressive Conservative	Greg Melchin	27	27.27%
NDP	Bob Brunet	25	25.25%
Liberal	Judy Stewart	21	21.21%
Alberta Alliance	Jenell Friesen	15	15.15%
Green	Jeffery Krekoski	11	11.12%
Total		99	100%
Rejected, spoiled and declined		4	

== See also ==
- List of Alberta provincial electoral districts
- Canadian provincial electoral districts
