= Rajan Sawhney =

Canadian politician

The Honourable Rajan Sawhney ECA MLA
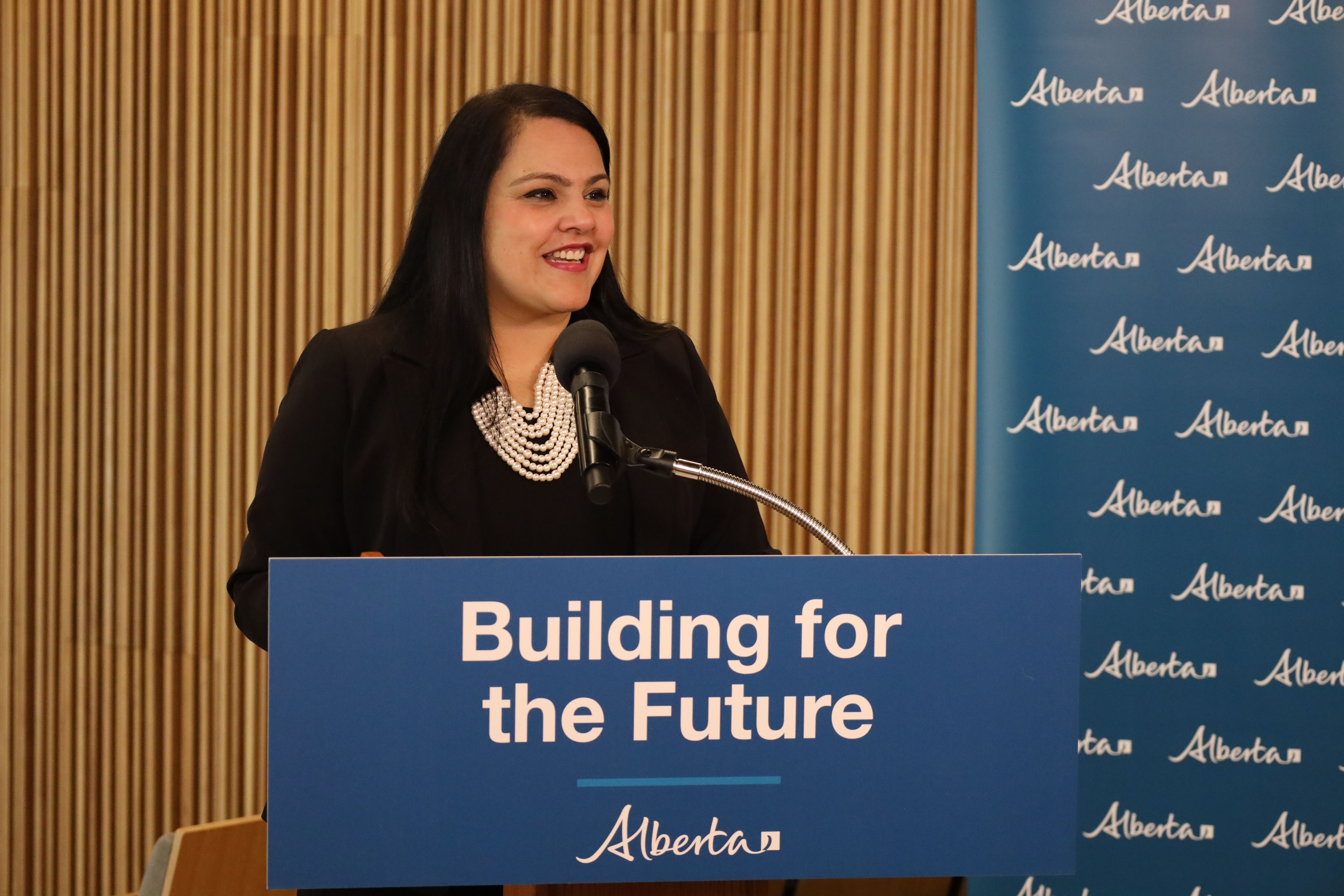
- Sawhney in 2023

Minister of Indigenous Relations
- Incumbent
- Assumed office May 16, 2025
- Premier: Danielle Smith
- Preceded by: Rick Wilson

Minister of Advanced Education
- In office June 9, 2023 – May 16, 2025
- Premier: Danielle Smith
- Preceded by: Demetrios Nicolaides
- Succeeded by: Myles McDougall

Minister of Trade, Immigration and Multiculturalism
- In office October 21, 2022 – June 9, 2023
- Premier: Danielle Smith
- Preceded by: Muhammad Yaseen
- Succeeded by: Matt Jones (Trade), Muhammad Yaseen (Immigration and Multiculturalism)

Minister of Transportation
- In office July 8, 2021 – October 21, 2022
- Premier: Jason Kenney, Danielle Smith
- Preceded by: Ric McIver
- Succeeded by: Devin Dreeshen

Minister of Community and Social Services
- In office April 30, 2019 – July 8, 2021
- Premier: Jason Kenney
- Preceded by: Irfan Sabir
- Succeeded by: Jason Luan

Member of the Legislative Assembly of Alberta for Calgary-North West
- Incumbent
- Assumed office May 29, 2023
- Preceded by: Sonya Savage

Member of the Legislative Assembly of Alberta for Calgary-North East
- In office April 30, 2019 – May 1, 2023
- Succeeded by: Gurinder Brar

Personal details
- Born: May 2, 1971 (age 55) Calgary, Alberta, Canada
- Party: United Conservative Party
- Education: University of Calgary

Rajan Sawhney is a Canadian politician and former energy-sector economist who has served as Alberta's Minister of Indigenous Relations since May 16, 2025. A member of the United Conservative Party, she has represented Calgary-North West in the Legislative Assembly of Alberta since 2023, having previously represented Calgary-North East from 2019 to 2023.

== Early life and education ==
Born and raised in Calgary, Sawhney attended the University of Calgary, where she earned degrees in economics and political science, as well as a Master of Business Administration.

== Professional career ==
Before entering provincial politics in 2019, Sawhney spent more than two decades working in Alberta's oil and gas industry, specializing in economics, energy-sector analysis, and business development. Her career included positions with petroleum producers, energy consulting firms, and the provincial energy regulator.

Sawhney began her professional career as a reserves analyst with Anadarko Petroleum, where she worked from 1997 to 2006. She subsequently joined Vermilion Energy, serving as a business development economist between 2007 and 2014. From 2012 to 2017, she also held an economist position with Resmodman, an energy-sector consulting business.

Between 2017 and 2018, Sawhney worked as an economist with the Alberta Energy Regulator (AER). Her work included economic analysis relating to methane-emissions abatement regulations. In a 2019 interview with Alberta Views, she discussed how her experience with energy regulation and investment policy influenced her decision to enter provincial politics.

From 2018 to 2019, Sawhney served as vice-president of business development at Fracture Modeling Inc. (FRACMOD), a Calgary-based oil and gas consulting company specializing in reservoir modelling, subsurface analysis, and petroleum engineering services. The company was founded by her husband, petroleum engineer Gurpreet Sawhney.

== Political career ==
=== Election to the Legislative Assembly ===
Sawhney entered provincial politics as a candidate for the United Conservative Party (UCP) in the 2019 Alberta general election. She was elected to the Legislative Assembly of Alberta on April 16, 2019, representing Calgary-North East. Following the UCP's formation of government under Premier Jason Kenney, she was appointed to the Executive Council of Alberta.

=== Minister of Community and Social Services (2019–2021) ===
Sawhney was appointed Minister of Community and Social Services on April 30, 2019. Her portfolio encompassed income and disability assistance, employment supports, family violence prevention, and services delivered through community organizations.

During her tenure, the ministry was involved in Alberta's response to the COVID-19 pandemic, including funding for emergency shelters and homelessness services. The provincial government announced $48 million in additional support for homelessness services in August 2020.

Sawhney also served during the implementation of pandemic-related financial assistance programs, including the Critical Worker Benefit, which provided eligible workers with a one-time payment of $1,200.

=== Minister of Transportation (2021–2022) ===
In a cabinet reshuffle on July 8, 2021, Sawhney was appointed Minister of Transportation, succeeding Ric McIver. Her responsibilities included provincial highways, transportation infrastructure, commercial transportation, and road safety.

During her tenure, the ministry oversaw work on several transportation projects, including sections of Calgary's Stoney Trail ring road, highway improvements, and airport infrastructure. It also announced funding for wildlife-crossing infrastructure in the Bow Valley and transportation improvements in communities across Alberta.

In March 2022, Sawhney introduced the Traffic Safety Amendment Act, 2022, which expanded protections for roadside workers, including highway maintenance personnel and snowplow operators. The government also introduced changes to the regulation of automated traffic enforcement and announced measures concerning commercial vehicle rest facilities.

=== 2022 United Conservative Party leadership election ===
On June 13, 2022, Sawhney announced her candidacy in the 2022 United Conservative Party leadership election, following Jason Kenney's decision to resign as party leader. She stepped away from her cabinet responsibilities during the leadership campaign.

Her campaign addressed economic policy, affordability, and the province's response to the COVID-19 pandemic. Among her proposals was an independent public inquiry into Alberta's pandemic response. She finished sixth in the leadership election, which was won by Danielle Smith.

=== Minister of Trade, Immigration and Multiculturalism (2022–2023) ===
Following Smith's appointment as premier, Sawhney returned to cabinet as Minister of Trade, Immigration and Multiculturalism on October 21, 2022.

The portfolio included provincial trade policy, international commercial relationships, immigration programs, and multiculturalism initiatives. During her tenure, Sawhney participated in federal-provincial-territorial discussions concerning internal trade and the reduction of interprovincial trade barriers.

=== Minister of Advanced Education (2023–2025) ===
Sawhney was elected to represent Calgary-North West in the 2023 Alberta general election and was appointed Minister of Advanced Education on June 9, 2023.

Her portfolio encompassed Alberta's post-secondary education system, including universities, colleges, apprenticeship education, student financial assistance, and workforce-related training.

In a September 2023 interview with The Gateway, Sawhney identified enrolment in high-demand programs, skilled trades, student affordability, and the recognition of internationally obtained credentials among her priorities. She also discussed the government's targeted enrolment expansion program, which provided funding for additional post-secondary spaces in fields facing labour shortages.

During her tenure, the provincial government announced additional post-secondary capital investments and funding for education and training programs. Student affordability, institutional operating funding, and campus mental health services remained subjects of discussion between the ministry and student organizations.

=== Minister of Indigenous Relations (2025–present) ===
On May 16, 2025, Sawhney was appointed Minister of Indigenous Relations in a cabinet reshuffle under Premier Danielle Smith, succeeding Rick Wilson.

The ministry is responsible for provincial relationships with First Nations, Métis communities, and other Indigenous organizations, as well as policies and programs concerning Indigenous economic participation and reconciliation.

On April 1, 2026, Sawhney was additionally appointed to the Premier's Investment Council.

==== Recall petition ====
In November 2025, a recall petition was initiated against Sawhney in Calgary-North West under Alberta's Recall Act.

On February 27, 2026, Elections Alberta announced that the petition had been unsuccessful. The preliminary count recorded 3,399 signatures, below the 14,893 required to meet the statutory threshold. As the preliminary count was insufficient, the verification process ended without proceeding to further signature validation.

== Awards ==
In December 2019, Sawhney received the Most Promising Newcomer award in an informal vote among members of the Legislative Assembly of Alberta. The recognition was part of an awards initiative organized by Speaker Nathan Cooper, in which MLAs voted for their colleagues across nine categories.

Sawhney was subsequently named Best Alberta Cabinet Minister in the 2022 and 2023 Best of Alberta Politics reader surveys conducted by political commentator Dave Cournoyer. The annual surveys invite readers to vote on categories recognizing Alberta politicians and public officials.

== Electoral history ==
=== 2023 Alberta general election ===
2023 Alberta general election: Calgary-North West
Party	Candidate	Votes	%	±%
United Conservative Party	Rajan Sawhney	11,921	48.31	−8.36
Alberta New Democratic Party	Michael Lisboa-Smith	11,778	47.73	+15.94
Alberta Party	Jenny Yeremiy	778	3.15	−5.92
Independent	Serena Thomsen	153	0.62	{{{change}}}
Solidarity Movement of Alberta	Alain Habel	45	0.18	
Total votes		24,675	99.41	
Rejected ballots		147	0.59	
Turnout		24,822	70.15	{{{change}}}
United Conservative Party hold		Swing	−12.15	

=== 2019 Alberta general election ===
2019 Alberta general election: Calgary-North East
Party	Candidate	Votes	%	±%
United Conservative Party	Rajan Sawhney	8,376	49.35	
Alberta New Democratic Party	Gurbachan Brar	6,046	35.62	
Alberta Party	Nate Pike	1,791	10.55	
Alberta Liberal Party	Gul Khan	761	4.48	
Total votes		16,974	99.39	
Rejected ballots		105	0.61	
Turnout		17,079	62.42	{{{change}}}
