= Gurinder Brar =

Canadian politician from Alberta

Gurinder Brar MLA

Member of the Legislative Assembly of Alberta for Calgary-North East
- Incumbent
- Assumed office May 29, 2023
- Preceded by: Rajan Sawhney

Personal details
- Party: NDP
- Occupation: Businessperson, instructor, politician

Gurinder Brar is a Canadian politician from the Alberta New Democratic Party. He was elected as a member of the Legislative Assembly of Alberta for Calgary-Northeast in the 2023 Alberta general election. As of June 21, 2024, he served as the Official Opposition Critic for Small Business. Currently, he serves as the Shadow Minister of Service Alberta and Red Tape Reduction. Brar is from Punjab India. He speaks fluently in Punjabi, Hindi, English etc.

Brar has a bachelor's degree in accounting from the Southern Alberta Institute of Technology and a master's degree in public policy and management from the University of London.

== Electoral history ==
2023 Alberta general election: Calgary-North East
Party	Candidate	Votes	%	±%
New Democratic	Gurinder Brar	11,117	55.05	+19.43
United Conservative	Inder Grewal	9,078	44.95	-4.39
Total		20,195	99.28	–
Rejected and declined		147	0.72	
Turnout		20,342	56.37	
Eligible electors		35,457		
New Democratic gain from United Conservative		Swing		+11.91
Source(s) Source: Elections Alberta
