= Trees for Life (United States) =

Trees for Life is an international nonprofit movement, based in Wichita, Kansas, USA, that works for the empowerment of villagers in developing countries.

== History ==
This movement started by enabling people around the world to help plant fruit trees in developing countries. Now it has matured to where Trees for Life provides a platform for people of various disciplines to work on long-term fundamental solutions to problems in the areas of education, health and environment.

Trees for Life was founded in 1984 by Balbir Mathur, an India-born American businessman. While working as an international business consultant, Mathur had several life-changing experiences, and went through an illness that left him unable to walk for two years. After his illness he started helping people in India plant fruit trees. He left his former business interests and started doing this work full-time. When others wanted to help on a full-time basis, Mathur realized that the vision was larger than himself.

Trees for Life has had projects in India, Guatemala, Haiti, Brazil, Nepal, Costa Rica, Indonesia, Nicaragua and Cambodia. According to the organization, more than two million people have participated in its programs and tens of millions of fruit trees have been planted.

In the mid-1990s, Trees for Life learned that the highly nutritious leaves of the Moringa oleifera tree were a simple yet overlooked resource for combating malnutrition for the poor. So they designed and implemented programs to share this message with people in developing countries. Today, governments in Asia, Africa and Latin America plant Moringa trees as a national policy—including more than 20 million trees in Africa alone.

Trees for Life has also initiated a program called "Books for Life." This project aims to instill a love of reading and interest in learning in areas of the world where people have limited or no access to books and education. In partnership with local communities, who provide partial funding, library staff and management, libraries have been established or enhanced in Nicaragua, India and Pakistan. Each year during 2006-2010 a "Kansas Youth Book Drive" was held. People across the state of Kansas have donated more than 138,000 gently used children's books for Pakistan, Liberia, several other African countries, and under-served populations in the USA.
