= 1st Source =

Financial services company

1st Source Corporation
- Logo

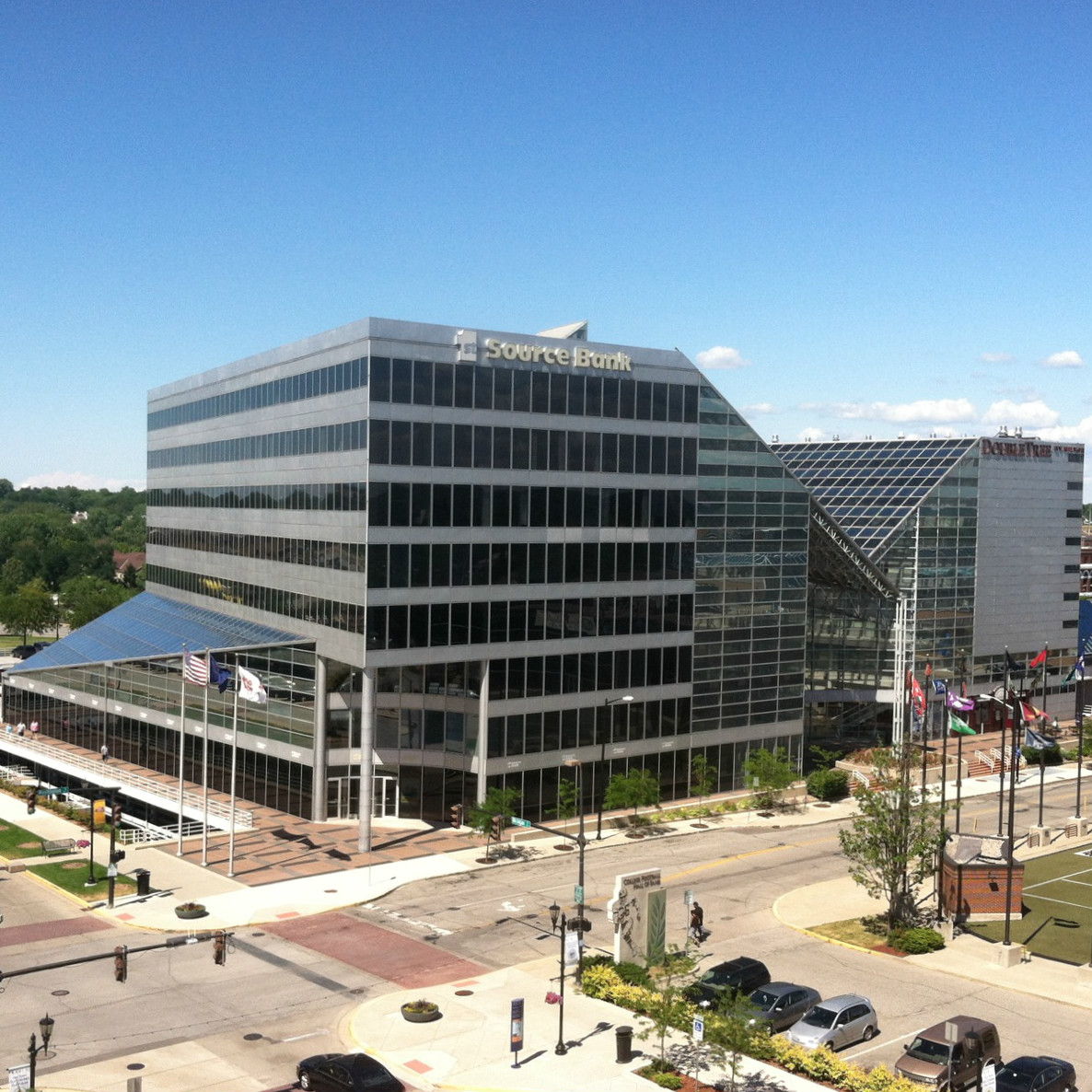
- South Bend office
- Type: Public
- Traded as: Nasdaq: SRCE; Russell 2000 component
- Industry: Banking
- Founded: 1863; 163 years ago
- Headquarters: South Bend, Indiana
- Key people: Christopher J. Murphy III (chairman & CEO; James R. Seitz (president); Andrea G. Short (CFO)
- Total assets: ▲$5.638 billion (2017)
- Total equity: ▲$0.702 billion (2017)
- Number of employees: 1,150 (2017)
- Website: www.1stsource.com

1st Source Corporation is a financial services company headquartered in South Bend, Indiana. It operates 1st Source Bank, a bank with 81 branches in Indiana and Michigan. The bank's Specialty Finance Group provides financing for aircraft, trucks, and construction equipment. 1st Source Insurance provides insurance products and services.

== History ==
The company was founded in 1863 as the First National Bank of South Bend.

In the early 1930s, the company merged with First National and Union Trust to form First Bank and Trust Company.

Under the leadership of Ernest M. Morris, the bank survived the Great Depression and in 1935 it opened its first branch.

In 1946, the bank opened its second branch.

By the end of the 1950s, it was the seventh largest bank in Indiana.

In 1981, the bank changed its name to 1st Source Bank.

In 2007, the company folded its Trustcorp Mortgage Company subsidiary into its bank subsidiary.

In December 2014, the bank opened 2 branches and remodeled 6 others in Fort Wayne, Indiana at a cost of about $8 million. All 8 locations do not use traditional teller windows in favor of "side-by-side" banking where tellers share their screens and work space with clients.

In December 2015, the bank broke ground on 2 additional branches in Fort Wayne.

In 2016, the bank made the most Small Business Administration loans in Indiana among banks with less than $10 billion in assets.

In October 2016, the bank received approval to open a branch in Sarasota, Florida.
