= Digital supply chain =

The digital supply chain is a new media term which encompasses the process of the delivery of digital media, be it music or video, by electronic means, from the point of origin (content provider) to destination (consumer). In much the same manner a physical medium must go through a “supply chain” process in order to mature into a consumable product, digital media must pass through various stages in processing to get to a point in which the consumer can enjoy the music or video on a mobile device, computer, or television set.

A broader definition of the term "digital supply chain" is given in a book chapter by Tony Hines where the term was coined in 2001 to explain a transformation from what he called analogue supply chains to his new conception - the digital supply chain. This contribution recognised that digital supply chains were configured to distribute goods or services that had previously been supplied in physical form. Examples given included books, music and film. However, Hines also expanded the definition to include business to business services and he gives the example of fashion design and product development conducted digitally. This digitalisation of hitherto physical form (which he called analogue supply chains) removed time, distance and cost from the supply chain. Hines gives a number of examples. Hines gives further examples of how information has replaced inventory by designing digital supply chains you can read more in his Supply Chain Strategies book published by Routledge.

== Components ==
Below are some of the components and processes involved in the digital supply chain, in roughly sequential order, to bring raw content to a format available to a consumer via personal computer or set-top box:

=== Content Provider ===
The content provider provides the actual content that will ultimately be consumed by the end-user. The content provider provides the content in a variety of formats - including film, tape, CD, DVD, hard disks and digital files.

=== Capture ===
If the content provided by the content provider is not already in a digital format, it must first be converted to a digital format. In the case of film or tape, this is often called the “capture” process in which hardware will play back the original medium and “capture” its contents and convert it into a digital format. This captured file is often captured at the highest feasible quality as it is expected to undergo various processes that could degrade the quality. Therefore, the highest possible capture is always desired.

=== Compression ===
The captured digital file is often extremely large, requiring a large amount of digital storage space and impossible to deliver to the consumer via broadband methods. Therefore, it must be compressed in a process called encoding or transcoding.

In this process, a codec is used to compress the captured digital file into a format which is small enough to be delivered to the end-user, usually via broadband methods. This encoding process entails consideration of many variables as to how the file is to be compressed. For audio, this usually consists of bit-rate and sample rate. Additional variables for video include resolution, frame rate and also has its own bit-rate that needs to be specified.

These variables are determined by how a particular file is to be consumed; download, streaming to a PC, streaming to a mobile device, etc.

Quality, however, often becomes an issue at this stage and great care is taken to ensure the quality of the medium is of the highest possible quality for its intended deliver method. For example, a video encoded for streaming to mobile devices requires a much higher level of compression than would for a PC download, so the quality of the video will not be nearly as good.

=== Quality Control ===
Quality control is required to ensure that a file that has been encoded properly, with desired results and free of corruption. The degree to which a file is considered acceptable is based either on the discretion of the party charged with encoding the content, or a specific standard defined by the content owner for which the encoding party must comply.

Quality control need not only take place at this juncture. Most companies dealing with the digital supply chain process will subject the media to scrutiny of the quality control process at various stages including: original capture, post-compression, post-ingest and post-publish, thus ensuring the media has not become corrupt or has not been degraded undesirably during any stage along the digital supply chain process.

=== Digital Asset Management ===
The digital asset management system handles the metadata, content and their related assets such as album cover and movie poster art. It is often the digital asset management systems which also handles the publishing of the content itself to a digital storefront. Some digital asset management systems specifically built for the digital supply chain and the delivery of electronic media will track the progress of content as it goes through the digital supply chain. A good digital asset management system should also include reporting tools which can report back on the status of various aspects of the digital supply chain itself.

=== Metadata Entry ===
Metadata is the information that identifies and describes the contents of a medium. This information can include media-specific information such as: Title, artist(s), production company, seasonal/episodic description, original release date, etc. Metadata can also include business-related information such as: pricing and availability.

=== Digital Rights Management ===
An important aspect of the digital supply chain is the process of encrypting the content so that it cannot be played back without the proper license which is often acquired via purchase of content or subscription. This reduces the possibility of media being pirated.

=== Ingest ===
Ingest is the stage in which the compressed file and metadata are put into the digital asset management system. It is not necessary for the metadata and the compressed media file to be ingested into the system at the same time, however, there will be a point in the process in which both have been ingested into the system and the metadata can reference the media file.

=== Content Delivery Network ===
When media files are ingested they are hosted and delivered from a content delivery network (CDN) capable of delivering the media to the end-user. The CDN should be able to support the expected number of consumers.

=== Merchant/Storefront/Digital Retailer/Digital Service Provider ===
The content will ultimately display on a digital storefront where the consumer can view a catalog listing of the content and access the content via purchase, subscription or other method a merchant has elected to make the content available.

Digital Supply Chain Management

The digital supply chain has developed through the rapid digital transformation of the traditional supply chain, as a result of the Fourth Industrial Revolution. The objective of the digital supply chain is to optimize decisions related to both supply and demand and their interconnectedness, utilizing cutting-edge technology and a comprehensive understanding of the roles played by stakeholders across the supply chain. Additionally, the digital supply chain aims to create value for the stakeholders and promote societal welfare while upholding ethical principles. Hence, the main dimensions of the digital supply chain are integration, relationship and cooperation, value creation, and ethical values. Integration is mainly related to the TOP framework and is one of the most important aspects of the development of the digital supply chain.

Digital supply chains are supposed to create a more efficient supply chain and thus, strengthen the organization’s business strategy and relationship with both suppliers and customers. By integrating activities such as blockchain and the Internet of Things, inefficiencies within the chain could be reduced. However, the digital supply chain can increase the complexity of management. In order for digitalization to succeed, there must be resources available to shape key capabilities.

Digital Supply Chain Resources and Capabilities

Resources in this context are related to technology, the organization’s internal and external infrastructure to support the technology, tangible assets, and intangible assets, and the people operating to create value. Capabilities, on the other hand, are the result of the interaction of the resources and thus the ability to integrate the resources and manage them decides the quality of the capabilities. For example, a worker’s digital skills refer to the worker’s ability and behavior in regard to using the technology and thus, creating value. Smart production capabilities involve the utilization of technologies that empower production systems to embrace smart models. Customer collaboration refers to the customers providing feedback on their experience with the product or service provided by the organization.
