= Sonya Savage =

Canadian politician

The Honourable Sonya Savage ECA KC

Minister of Energy
- In office April 30, 2019 – May 29, 2023
- Premier: Jason Kenney
- Preceded by: Margaret McCuaig-Boyd
- Succeeded by: Peter Guthrie

Member of the Alberta Legislative Assembly for Calgary-North West
- In office April 16, 2019 – May 29, 2023
- Preceded by: Sandra Jansen
- Succeeded by: Rajan Sawhney

Personal details
- Born: 1967 (age 58–59)
- Party: United Conservative Party
- Occupation: Lawyer; politician

Sonya M. Savage ECA KC is a Canadian politician who was the minister of energy for Alberta from April 20, 2019, to October 2022. She was Minister of Environment and Protected Areas, being appointed on October 21, 2022. A member of the United Conservative Party (UCP), she was elected following the 2019 Alberta general election to represent Calgary-North West in the Legislative Assembly of Alberta. Savage also acted as the minister of justice and solicitor general of Alberta from January 18 to February 25, 2022, while incumbent minister Kaycee Madu underwent a probe into his conduct.

Savage was on the Legislative Review Committee and also previously was the Deputy Government House Leader.

In September 2023, she became Senior Counsel at Borden Ladner Gervais. As of March 2024, she is also a Board Director for E3 Lithium.

== Political career ==
Savage was elected following the 2019 Alberta general election to represent Calgary-North West.

In March 2023 announced she would stand down at the 2023 Alberta general election.

=== Minister of Energy (April 2019- October, 2022) and Minister of Environment and Protected Areas (October, 2022- June, 2023) ===
Savage, whose background in energy and the environment includes major projects, such as the Enbridge Northern Gateway Pipelines and with her work as an executive of Canadian Energy Pipeline Association (CEPA), was appointed Minister of Energy on April 30, 2019. She had been tasked with overhauling the Alberta Energy Regulator (AER)—one of the UCP's campaign promises with the aim of implementing "shorter timelines for project approvals." She was also involved in "CEPA's examination of Bill C-69, Ottawa's overhaul of how major energy projects — including oil and gas pipelines — are reviewed by the federal government."

While Energy Minister, she implemented a liability management framework to accelerate reclamation of well sites. She established a framework to advance CCUS hubs and allocate pore space for decarbonization projects. She brought in legislation, regulation and policies related to critical mineral development, geothermal energy, helium, hydrogen, and small modular reactors. While Environment Minister, she developed a net-zero climate plan for the province, the Emissions Reduction and Energy Development Plan, announced in April, 2023. https://www.alberta.ca/emissions-reduction-and-energy-development-plan.aspx

In February 2019, the previous government signed a crude-by-rail program agreement with two railway companies—and the Canadian Pacific Railway (CPR) Canadian National Railway (CNR) with a goal of reducing the Western Canadian Select price discount that has been exacerbated by the "lack of pipeline capacity". Through the four-year, $3.7-billion agreement the "province would have purchased and shipped 120,000 barrels of crude a day." The New Democratic Party (NDP) government had estimated that the program would have generated "revenue of $6-billion", according to The Globe and Mail. The Kenney government cancelled the agreement shortly after taking office due to the estimate that it would have costed over $10.6 billion and would be something more appropriately left to the private sector.

In the first year as minister Savage negotiated with Canadian Pacific Railway (CPR) Canadian National Railway (CNR) to cancel the crude-by-rail program agreement signed by the Premier Rachel Notley.

In a May 20 interview on the Canadian Association of Oilwell Drilling Contractors (CAODC) podcast, Minister Savage told the podcast host, John Bavil, that Green party leader, Elizabeth May's May 6 comment that "oil is dead" was not "gaining resonance with ordinary Canadians" because Canadians need oil. "Canadians are just trying to get by." Savage added that Canadians were "not going to have tolerance and patience for protests that get in the way of people working", and that the "economic turmoil caused by the COVID-19 pandemic favours pipeline construction", according to Canadian Press journalist, Bob Weber. Savage told Bavil that "Now is a great time to be building a pipeline because you can't have protests of more than 15 people...Let's get it built." The comment received wide media coverage.

On January 18, 2022, Premier Jason Kenney announced that Savage would serve as acting minister of justice pending the conclusion of a probe into the incumbent minister Kaycee Madu's behaviour following a traffic stop.

== Electoral record ==
2019 Alberta general election: Calgary-North West
Party	Candidate	Votes	%	±%
United Conservative	Sonya Savage	13,565	56.67	-2.77
New Democratic	Hafeez Chishti	7,611	31.80	+2.17
Alberta Party	Andrew Bradley	2,171	9.07	+2.98
Freedom Conservative	Cam Kham	262	1.09	
Liberal	Prerna Mahtani	258	1.08	-3.76
Independent	Roberta McDonald	69	0.29	
Total valid votes		23,936	99.06	
Rejected, spoiled and declined		228	0.94	+0.29
Turnout		24,164	71.95	
Eligible voters		33,584		
United Conservative notional hold		Swing		-2.47

Alberta provincial government of Jason Kenney
Cabinet post (1)
Predecessor	Office	Successor
Margaret McCuaig-Boyd	Minister of Energy; April 30, 2019–	Incumbent
