= List of Alberta public agencies =

Public agencies in Alberta are organizations linked to particular government ministries of the Executive Council of Alberta, operating under their direction and mandate. Their functions are roughly equivalent to federal crown corporations. Typically, public agencies are governed by a board of directors whose members are selected and appointed through Orders in Council or Ministerial Orders for fixed terms. Public agencies are generally (with a few exceptions) created and regulated under the Alberta Public Agencies Governance Act (APAGA), which stipulates their responsibilities, restrictions, and general structures. Many public agencies are also subject to more specific legislation and acts. There are five main categories of public agencies in Alberta:

1. Regulatory/Adjudicative: Regulatory agencies license, make rules for, and oversee sectors of society and economy. Adjudicative agencies have quasi-judicial powers, such as ruling on appeals. Some agencies combine both sets of functions.
2. Public Trust: These agencies administer provincial financial, cultural, and other assets for public purposes.
3. Corporate Enterprise: Corporate enterprises provide, sell, and market goods and services.
4. Service Delivery: These agencies provide and direct government services, such as healthcare and post-secondary education.
5. Advisory: These agencies provide advice to the government, acting as industry and stakeholder representatives.

As agencies are funded by and responsible to government ministries, they are supposed to operate transparently, and must publicly report board member compensation, travel and hospitality expenses, annual reports, codes of conduct, and mandate documents.

There are 231 public agencies in Alberta as of January 2024:

== Former public agencies ==
- Alberta Gas Trunk Line Company (AGTL)
- Alberta Government Telephones
- Alberta Liquor Control Board (ALCB)
- Alberta Oil Sands Technology and Research Authority (AOSTRA)
- Northern Alberta Railways

== Current public agencies ==
Name of public agency	Category	Responsibilities	Ministry
Alberta Assessors' Association - Executive Committee	Regulatory/Adjudicative	Manages and conducts the business and affairs of the Alberta Assessors' Association, and reviews disciplinary complaints.	Advanced Education
Alberta Association of Architects and the Association of Professional Engineers and Geoscientists of Alberta (APEGA) - Joint Board of Practice	Regulatory/Adjudicative	Operates a Joint Board of Practice, including provisions respecting the assessment of applications for authorization certificates, recommendations on applications for authority to prepare final drawings for buildings, and more.	Advanced Education
Alberta Association of Architects - Council	Regulatory/Adjudicative	Manages and conducts the business and affairs of the Alberta Association of Architects.	Advanced Education
Alberta Association of Architects - Practice Review Board	Advisory	Responsible for the assessment of existing and development of new educational and experience requirements for registration; makes recommendations on the IAP, IID, and Professional Development Programs.	Advanced Education
Alberta Association of Landscape Architects - Board of Directors	Regulatory/Adjudicative	Manages and conducts the business of the Alberta Association of Landscape Architects.	Advanced Education
Alberta Board of Skilled Trades	Advisory	Consults with industry to make recommendations respecting: the designation and rescission of designation of trades; standards and requirements for certification in trades; advice on restricted activities and classes of individuals who can perform them; establishing standards, requirements, undertakings falling under, and the successful completion of education, training, and/or apprenticeship for trades.	Advanced Education
Alberta Council on Admissions and Transfer (ACAT)	Advisory	Responsible for providing guidance and advice on post-secondary admission and accreditation/certification transfer policy.	Advanced Education
Alberta Human Ecology and Home Economics Association (AHEA) - Board of Directors	Regulatory/Adjudicative	Focused on improving the quality of life of families and individuals through the best use of their resources; offers professional development and networking opportunities to human ecologists and home economists.	Advanced Education
Alberta Institute of Agrologists - Complaint Review and Hearing Tribunals	Regulatory/Adjudicative	Administers complaints reviews and hearing tribunals in the profession of agrology.	Advanced Education
Alberta Institute of Agrologists - Council	Regulatory/Adjudicative	Manages and conducts the activities of the Alberta Institute of Agrologists.	Advanced Education
Alberta Land Surveyors' Association - Council	Regulatory/Adjudicative	Manages and conducts the activities of the Alberta Land Surveyors' Association.	Advanced Education
Alberta Land Surveyors' Association - Practice Review Board	Advisory	Assesses and develops new educational standards, experience requirements, desirable competence standards of practitioners.	Advanced Education
Alberta Professional Planners Institute (APPI) - Council	Regulatory/Adjudicative	Represents the profession of planners within Alberta, the Northwest Territories, and Nunavut.	Advanced Education
Alberta Shorthand Reporters' Association - Council	Regulatory/Adjudicative	Manages and conducts the activities of the Alberta Shorthand Reporters' Association and associated services, including broadcast captioning, communication access realtime translation (CART), and court reporting.	Advanced Education
Alberta Society of Professional Biologists - Board of Directors	Regulatory/Adjudicative	Self-regulating agency representing Professional Biologists, including administering a code of ethics, continuing competency, and certifications.	Advanced Education
Alberta University of the Arts Board of Governors	Service Delivery	Appointed by the Minister of Advanced Education; the Board of Governors are responsible for establishing admission, enrolment, and program requirements; annual budgets, determining domestic and international tuition rates; disciplining staff and students; setting the working conditions in contracts with academic and non-academic staff unions.	Advanced Education
Alberta Veterinary Medical Association (ABVMA) - Council	Regulatory/Adjudicative	The professional regulatory organization governing the practice of veterinary medicine in Alberta.	Advanced Education
Alberta Veterinary Medical Association (ABVMA) - Hearing Tribunal and Complaint Review Committee	Regulatory/Adjudicative	Reviews and directs referrals, complaints, and investigations against veterinarians.	Advanced Education
Alberta Veterinary Medical Association (ABVMA) - Practice Review Board	Advisory	Assesses existing and develops new educational, experience, and competence standards for registered veterinarians and permit holders.	Advanced Education
Association of Professional Engineers and Geoscientists of Alberta (APEGA) & Association of Science and Engineering Technology Professionals of Alberta (ASET) - Joint Board of Examiners	Regulatory/Adjudicative	Adjudicates allegations of unskilled practice or unprofessional conduct against technology professionals.	Advanced Education
Association of Professional Engineers and Geoscientists of Alberta (APEGA) & Association of Science and Engineering Technology Professionals of Alberta (ASET) - Joint Appeal Board	Regulatory/Adjudicative	Reviews appeals from hearings and reviews against professional technologists, and decisions or orders of the Joint Practice Review Board.	Advanced Education
Association of Professional Engineers and Geoscientists of Alberta (APEGA) & Association of Science and Engineering Technology Professionals of Alberta (ASET) - Joint Discipline Committee	Regulatory/Adjudicative	Investigates complaints against professional technologists received by the Registrar.	Advanced Education
Association of Professional Engineers and Geoscientists of Alberta (APEGA) & Association of Science and Engineering Technology Professionals of Alberta (ASET) - Joint Investigative Committee	Advisory	Investigates complaints against professional technologists received by the Registrar.	Advanced Education
Association of Professional Engineers and Geoscientists of Alberta (APEGA) & Association of Science and Engineering Technology Professionals of Alberta (ASET) - Joint Practice Review Board	Advisory	Assesses existing and develops new educational, experience, competence, and continuing professional development standards for professional technologists.	Advanced Education
Association of Professional Engineers and Geoscientists of Alberta (APEGA) & Association of Science and Engineering Technology Professionals of Alberta (ASET) - Joint Professional Technologists Regulation Committee	Regulatory/Adjudicative	May make regulations regarding the eligibility of applications for registration as professional technologists, the establishment and administration of a register of technologists along with their functions, duties, and responsibilities of the ASET Registrar.	Advanced Education
Association of Alberta Forest Management Professionals Council	Regulatory/Adjudicative	Responsible for regulating Alberta's forest management professionals and forest services.	Advanced Education
Association of Alberta Forest Management Professionals - Joint Complaint Review Committee and Hearing Tribunal	Regulatory/Adjudicative	Investigates complaints of unethical/unskilled practices by forest management professionals, and if found guilty can restrict their practice, require skills upgrading, or impose fines.	Advanced Education
Association of Professional Engineers and Geoscientists of Alberta (APEGA) - Appeal Board	Regulatory/Adjudicative	Hears appeals of any decision or order made against professional members, licensees, permit holders, or certificate holders.	Advanced Education
Association of Professional Engineers and Geoscientists of Alberta (APEGA) - Board of Examiners	Regulatory/Adjudicative	Confirms that individuals approved for registration in the professions of engineering and geoscience meet the standards.	Advanced Education
Association of Professional Engineers and Geoscientists of Alberta (APEGA) - Council	Regulatory/Adjudicative	Manages and conducts the business and affairs of APEGA.	Advanced Education
Association of Professional Engineers and Geoscientists of Alberta (APEGA) - Discipline Committee	Regulatory/Adjudicative	Adjudicates allegations of unskilled practice or unprofessional conduct against APEGA members, and maintains competence, ethics, and skill standards.	Advanced Education
Association of Professional Engineers and Geoscientists of Alberta (APEGA) - Investigative Committee	Advisory	Investigates complaints against members of APEGA.	Advanced Education
Association of Professional Engineers and Geoscientists of Alberta (APEGA) - Practice Review Board	Advisory	Assesses existing and develops new educational, experience, competence, and continuing professional development standards for professional members, licensees, permit holders, and certificate holders.	Advanced Education
Association of School Business Officials of Alberta - Executive Committee	Regulatory/Adjudicative	Controls and manages the business affairs of the Association including approving and adopting a code of ethics and representing school business officials.	Advanced Education
Association of Science and Engineering Technology Professionals of Alberta (ASET) - Council	Regulatory/Adjudicative	Manages and conducts the business and affairs of ASET.	Advanced Education
Association of the Chemical Profession of Alberta (ACPA) - Board of Directors	Regulatory/Adjudicative	Regulates the practice of chemists in Alberta, by issuing the certification of P.Chem (Professional Chemist) and C.I.T. (Chemist in Training) to members.	Advanced Education
Athabasca University Board of Governors	Service Delivery	Appointed by the Minister of Advanced Education; the Board of Governors are responsible for establishing admission, enrolment, and program requirements; annual budgets, determining domestic and international tuition rates; disciplining staff and students; setting the working conditions in contracts with academic and non-academic staff unions.	Advanced Education
Banff Centre for Arts and Creativity Board of Governors	Service Delivery	Appointed by the Minister of Advanced Education; the Board of Governors are responsible for establishing admission, enrolment, and program requirements; annual budgets, determining domestic and international tuition rates; disciplining staff and students; setting the working conditions in contracts with academic and non-academic staff unions. In October 2023, the Government of Alberta fired the entire board in order to administer an institutional review, related to recent investigations into complaints against the CEO and Chair.	Advanced Education
Bow Valley College Board of Governors	Service Delivery	Appointed by the Minister of Advanced Education; the Board of Governors are responsible for establishing admission, enrolment, and program requirements; annual budgets, determining domestic and international tuition rates; disciplining staff and students; setting the working conditions in contracts with academic and non-academic staff unions.	Advanced Education
Campus Alberta Quality Council	Advisory	Offers recommendations and advice to the Minister of Advanced Education on applications for new post-secondary institutions, and monitoring the quality and operations of existing degree programs.	Advanced Education
Canadian Information Processing Society of Alberta - Board of Directors	Regulatory/Adjudicative	Offers networking opportunities to IT professionals, professional certification, accreditation of post-secondary IT programs, and operates an IT job board.	Advanced Education
Chartered Professional Accountants of Alberta - Board of Directors	Regulatory/Adjudicative	Professional regulatory body for chartered professional accountants.	Advanced Education
Chartered Professional Accountants of Alberta - Discipline and Appeal Tribunals Roster of Public Members	Regulatory/Adjudicative	Investigates and adjudicates allegations of unprofessional conduct of chartered professional accountants; hears appeals and can quash, confirm, vary, or reverse all of part of any decisions made.	Advanced Education
Electrical Contractors Association of Alberta (ECAA) - Board of Directors	Regulatory/Adjudicative	Manages and conducts the business and affairs of the ECCA.	Advanced Education
MacEwan University Board of Governors	Service Delivery	Appointed by the Minister of Advanced Education; the Board of Governors are responsible for establishing admission, enrolment, and program requirements; annual budgets, determining domestic and international tuition rates; disciplining staff and students; setting the working conditions in contracts with academic and non-academic staff unions.	Advanced Education
Institute of Certified Management Consultants of Alberta - Board of Directors	Regulatory/Adjudicative	Oversees the profession of certified management consultants in Alberta.	Advanced Education
Keyano College Board of Governors	Service Delivery	Appointed by the Minister of Advanced Education; the Board of Governors are responsible for establishing admission, enrolment, and program requirements; annual budgets, determining domestic and international tuition rates; disciplining staff and students; setting the working conditions in contracts with academic and non-academic staff unions.	Advanced Education
Lakeland College Board of Governors	Service Delivery	Appointed by the Minister of Advanced Education; the Board of Governors are responsible for establishing admission, enrolment, and program requirements; annual budgets, determining domestic and international tuition rates; disciplining staff and students; setting the working conditions in contracts with academic and non-academic staff unions.	Advanced Education
Land Agent Advisory Committee	Advisory	Advises the Minister and Registrar of Land Agents on activities impacting land owners, land agents, and employers; upon request, may review qualifications of license applications for and standards of conduct for land agents.	Advanced Education
Lethbridge College Board of Governors	Service Delivery	Appointed by the Minister of Advanced Education; the Board of Governors are responsible for establishing admission, enrolment, and program requirements; annual budgets, determining domestic and international tuition rates; disciplining staff and students; setting the working conditions in contracts with academic and non-academic staff unions.	Advanced Education
Medicine Hat College Board of Governors	Service Delivery	Appointed by the Minister of Advanced Education; the Board of Governors are responsible for establishing admission, enrolment, and program requirements; annual budgets, determining domestic and international tuition rates; disciplining staff and students; setting the working conditions in contracts with academic and non-academic staff unions.	Advanced Education
Minister's Advisory Council on Higher Education and Skills	Advisory	Provides advice and recommendations to the Minister regarding strategic goals of post-secondary institutions, performance metrics, institutional re-structuring. Has been criticized for undermining institutional autonomy and promoting austerity and neoliberalism through its recommendations, such as performance-based funding.	Advanced Education
Mount Royal University Board of Governors	Service Delivery	Appointed by the Minister of Advanced Education; the Board of Governors are responsible for establishing admission, enrolment, and program requirements; annual budgets, determining domestic and international tuition rates; disciplining staff and students; setting the working conditions in contracts with academic and non-academic staff unions.	Advanced Education
NorQuest College Board of Governors	Service Delivery	Appointed by the Minister of Advanced Education; the Board of Governors are responsible for establishing admission, enrolment, and program requirements; annual budgets, determining domestic and international tuition rates; disciplining staff and students; setting the working conditions in contracts with academic and non-academic staff unions.	Advanced Education
Northern Alberta Institute of Technology (NAIT) Board of Governors	Service Delivery	Appointed by the Minister of Advanced Education; the Board of Governors are responsible for establishing admission, enrolment, and program requirements; annual budgets, determining domestic and international tuition rates; disciplining staff and students; setting the working conditions in contracts with academic and non-academic staff unions.	Advanced Education
Northern Lakes College Board of Governors	Service Delivery	Appointed by the Minister of Advanced Education; the Board of Governors are responsible for establishing admission, enrolment, and program requirements; annual budgets, determining domestic and international tuition rates; disciplining staff and students; setting the working conditions in contracts with academic and non-academic staff unions.	Advanced Education
Northwestern Polytechnic Board of Governors	Service Delivery	Appointed by the Minister of Advanced Education; the Board of Governors are responsible for establishing admission, enrolment, and program requirements; annual budgets, determining domestic and international tuition rates; disciplining staff and students; setting the working conditions in contracts with academic and non-academic staff unions.	Advanced Education
Olds College Board of Governors	Service Delivery	Appointed by the Minister of Advanced Education; the Board of Governors are responsible for establishing admission, enrolment, and program requirements; annual budgets, determining domestic and international tuition rates; disciplining staff and students; setting the working conditions in contracts with academic and non-academic staff unions.	Advanced Education
Portage College Board of Governors	Service Delivery	Appointed by the Minister of Advanced Education; the Board of Governors are responsible for establishing admission, enrolment, and program requirements; annual budgets, determining domestic and international tuition rates; disciplining staff and students; setting the working conditions in contracts with academic and non-academic staff unions.	Advanced Education
Premier's Council on Skills	Advisory	Represents industries to align present and future education and training for desired job-skills.	Advanced Education
Red Deer Polytechnic Board of Governors	Service Delivery	Appointed by the Minister of Advanced Education; the Board of Governors are responsible for establishing admission, enrolment, and program requirements; annual budgets, determining domestic and international tuition rates; disciplining staff and students; setting the working conditions in contracts with academic and non-academic staff unions.	Advanced Education
Society of Local Government Managers of Alberta - Board of Directors	Regulatory/Adjudicative	Regulates local government managers, sets practice standards, and offers Certified Local Government Managers (CLGM) designation.	Advanced Education
Southern Alberta Institute of Technology (SAIT) Board of Governors	Service Delivery	Appointed by the Minister of Advanced Education; the Board of Governors are responsible for establishing admission, enrolment, and program requirements; annual budgets, determining domestic and international tuition rates; disciplining staff and students; setting the working conditions in contracts with academic and non-academic staff unions.	Advanced Education
Supply Chain Management Association Alberta - Board of Directors	Regulatory/Adjudicative	Providing information and education, leading to a professional designation as a SCMP (Supply Chain Management Professional)	Advanced Education
University of Alberta Board of Governors	Service Delivery	Appointed by the Minister of Advanced Education; the Board of Governors are responsible for establishing admission, enrolment, and program requirements; annual budgets, determining domestic and international tuition rates; disciplining staff and students; setting the working conditions in contracts with academic and non-academic staff unions.	Advanced Education
University of Alberta Senate	Advisory	Inquires into any matter benefiting the University.	Advanced Education
University of Calgary Board of Governors	Service Delivery	Appointed by the Minister of Advanced Education; the Board of Governors are responsible for establishing admission, enrolment, and program requirements; annual budgets, determining domestic and international tuition rates; disciplining staff and students; setting the working conditions in contracts with academic and non-academic staff unions.	Advanced Education
University of Calgary Senate	Advisory	Inquires into any matter benefiting the University.	Advanced Education
University of Lethbridge Board of Governors	Service Delivery	Appointed by the Minister of Advanced Education; the Board of Governors are responsible for establishing admission, enrolment, and program requirements; annual budgets, determining domestic and international tuition rates; disciplining staff and students; setting the working conditions in contracts with academic and non-academic staff unions.	Advanced Education
University of Lethbridge Senate	Advisory	Inquires into any matter benefiting the University.	Advanced Education
Alberta Electric System Operator	Regulatory/Adjudicative	Operates Alberta's electrical grid and electricity generation market (which as of November 2023, is 46% owned by TransAlta).	Affordability and Utilities
Alberta Utilities Commission	Regulatory/Adjudicative	Responsible for regulating the utilities sector, natural gas, and electricity markets.	Affordability and Utilities
Balancing Pool	Public Trust	Manages financial accounts related to the transition to a "competitive generation market"; meets obligations related to sold and unsold Power Purchase Arrangements.	Affordability and Utilities
Market Surveillance Administrator	Regulatory/Adjudicative	Acts as enforcement agency protecting the operations of Alberta's wholesale electricity markets and retail electricity and natural gas markets.	Affordability and Utilities
Power and Natural Gas Consumers' Panel	Advisory	Advises the Minister regarding policies and regulations affected residential, farm, and small business electricity and natural gas consumers.	Affordability and Utilities
Agriculture Financial Services Corporation	Corporate Enterprise	Provides lending and insurance services, and compensation programs including: loans to beginning farmers, commercial lending, crop insurance, hail insurance, and agricultural income stabilization payments.	Agriculture and Irrigation
Alberta Agricultural Products Marketing Council	Regulatory/Adjudicative	Provides advice on the establishment, operation, and control of boards and commissions legislated by the Marketing of Agricultural Products Act; helps with business and industry-oriented developments and research.	Agriculture and Irrigation
Drainage Council	Regulatory/Adjudicative	Advises the Minister, provides oversight and support to drainage districts, and hears appeals on decisions related to taxes and construction damages.	Agriculture and Irrigation
Farm Implement Board	Regulatory/Adjudicative	Manages the Farm Implement Compensation Fund, financed through dues, levies, penalties, and assessments on licensed dealers and distributors.	Agriculture and Irrigation
Irrigation Council	Regulatory/Adjudicative	Makes recommendations on issues related to the irrigation industry, hears appeals under the Irrigation Districts Act, establishes policies and procedures to rehabilitate irrigation district infrastructure.	Agriculture and Irrigation
Marketing of Agricultural Products Act Appeal Tribunal	Regulatory/Adjudicative	Hears appeals on orders, directions, and decisions by regulated agriculture and irrigation marketing boards and commissions.	Agriculture and Irrigation
Alberta Foundation for the Arts (AFA)	Public Trust	Supports and contributes to the arts in Alberta by providing participation opportunities, promoting Alberta artists; helps with the collecting, preservation, and display of works of art by Alberta artists.	Arts, Culture, and Status of Women
Conseil consultatif de l'Alberta en matière de francophonie / Alberta Advisory Council on the Francophonie	Advisory	Represents French-speaking Albertans, advises French Policy, improves the delivery of government services in French, makes recommendations on the use of provincial funding for services in French.	Arts, Culture, and Status of Women
Family Violence Death Review Committee (FVDRC)	Advisory	Reviews incidents of family violence resulting in deaths; advises Minister on prevention and reduction strategies for incidents of family violence.	Children and Family Services
Attendance Board	Regulatory/Adjudicative	Alternative to the court system for the enforcement of mandatory school attendance, for children aged 6 to 16.	Education
Board of Reference Roster	Regulatory/Adjudicative	Hears appeals on school-board decisions related to the termination of employment or designation of teachers, or refusal to release a teacher from a work contract.	Education
Certification Appeal Committee	Regulatory/Adjudicative	Responsible for hearing appeals related to the issuance or re-issuance of teacher certification.	Education
College of Alberta School Superintendents	Advisory	Promote public knowledge of the importance, aims, and interests of education in Alberta; improve the teaching profession by developing continuing education programs, conducting research to keep and improve competency;	Education
Minister's Youth Council	Advisory	Provides the Minister with student perspectives on policies, programs, and initiatives available through the K-12 education system.	Education
Professional Conduct and Competency General Panel	Regulatory/Adjudicative	Assigns panel members to serve on hearing and appeal committees, related to unprofessional conduct, professional incompetence, and related penalties.	Education
Alberta Energy Regulator Board of Directors	Advisory	Responsible for reviewing all energy development applications related to oil, bitumen, natural gas, deep geothermal, and coal; responsible for conducting inspections, penalizing companies, and holding hearings on controversial and environmentally destructive projects. The Board of Directors approves regulatory changes, sets performance standards, conducts investigations and compliance checks, and makes decisions on remediation and reclamation projects. Leadership of the Alberta Energy Regulator has been widely criticized for its close ties to oil executives and industry representatives. It has historically colluded with corporations to cover-up environmental catastrophes like oil spills and pipeline leakages - most recently in February 2023, when it was revealed that the AER hid evidence of multiple tailings ponds leakages at Imperial Oil's Kearl tar-sands mine, amounting to over 5.3 million litres of wastewater spillage, for multiple years.	Energy and Minerals
Alberta Energy Regulator Hearing Commission	Regulatory/Adjudicative	Responsible for reviewing all energy development applications related to oil, bitumen, natural gas, deep geothermal, and coal; responsible for conducting inspections, penalizing companies, and holding hearings on controversial and environmentally destructive projects. The Hearing Commissioners conduct hearings into energy applications, regulatory appeals, and other day-to-day operations.	Energy and Minerals
Alberta Petroleum Marketing Commission	Corporate Enterprise	Responsible for marketing and selling conventional crude oil received by the government, instead of receiving resource royalties; develops commodity prices, and implements the Bitumen Royalty-in-Kind (BRIK) Program.	Energy and Minerals
Alberta Conservation Association	Service Delivery	Conserving and enhancing Alberta's "natural biological resources" under Alberta's Wildlife Regulation.	Environment and Protected Areas
Alberta Professional Outfitters Society	Service Delivery	Qualifying, allocating opportunities to, disciplining, and licensing guides and outfitters (including non-resident and non-Canadians) in Alberta.	Environment and Protected Areas
Alberta Recycling Management Authority	Regulatory/Adjudicative	Manages provincially regulated recycling programs for scrap tires, waste electronics, and waste paint and paint containers.	Environment and Protected Areas
Beverage Container Management Board	Regulatory/Adjudicative	Manages the provincial recycling program for beverage containers.	Environment and Protected Areas
Caribou Sub-Regional Council	Advisory	Provides recommendations to the Minister for areas encompassing one or more of Alberta's caribou ranges, to maintain populations, consider multi-species conservation, recreational and economic opportunities, and the exercise of Treaty rights within them.	Environment and Protected Areas
Climate Change and Emissions Management Corporation (Emissions Reduction Alberta)	Service Delivery	Provides funding for greenhouse gas emissions reduction initiatives.	Environment and Protected Areas
Endangered Species Conservation Committee	Advisory	Advises the Minister on matters related to officially and unofficially recognized endangered species, biodiversity conservation, and recovery plans for endangered species.	Environment and Protected Areas
Environmental Appeals Board	Regulatory/Adjudicative	Hears appeals related to environmental approvals, water licenses, enforcement orders, reclamation and remediation certificates, preliminary certificates, administrative penalties, and environmental protection orders.	Environment and Protected Areas
Indigenous Wisdom Advisory Panel	Advisory	Advises the Chief Scientist and Minister on incorporating traditional ecological knowledge into the environmental science program.	Environment and Protected Areas
Mackenzie River Basin Board	Advisory	Administers the Mackenzie River Basin Transboundary Waters Master Agreement., regulating water quantity and quality sharing between Alberta, Saskatchewan, British Columbia, Yukon, and the Northwest Territories.	Environment and Protected Areas
Natural Resources Conservation Board	Regulatory/Adjudicative	Hears concerns and grievances relating to industrial development proposals in forestry, non-energy mining, recreation, and water management.	Environment and Protected Areas
Prairie Provinces Water Board	Advisory	Administers the Master Agreement on Apportionment regulating water quantity and quality sharing between Alberta, Saskatchewan, British Columbia, Yukon, and the Northwest Territories.	Environment and Protected Areas
Ronald Lake Bison Herd Cooperative Management Board	Advisory	Provides advice related to long-term sustainability of the Ronald Lake Bison Herd, as well as Indigenous uses and cultural connections to the herd and land.	Environment and Protected Areas
Science Advisory Panel	Advisory	Reviews the scientific validity and relevance of the environmental science program, and related research programs and plans.	Environment and Protected Areas
Water and Wastewater Operator Certification Advisory Committee	Advisory	Makes recommendations on certification program policy, facility classifications, applications for renewals, certification examinations, and specific training and education criteria.	Environment and Protected Areas
Alberta Order of Excellence Council	Advisory	Administers the Alberta Order of Excellence award.	Executive Council
Invest Alberta Corporation	Service Delivery	Attracts capital investment to Alberta from national and international investors, particularly in energy, agriculture, and tourism.	Executive Council
Birch Mountains Wildland Provincial Park Cooperative Management Board	Advisory	Provides recommendations on matters related to developing a park-specific management plan, and implementation oversight.	Forestry and Parks
Birch River Wildland Provincial ParkCooperative Management Board	Advisory	Provides recommendations on matters related to developing a park-specific management plan, and implementation oversight.	Forestry and Parks
Dillon River Wildland Provincial ParkCooperative Management Board	Advisory	Provides recommendations on matters related to developing a park-specific management plan, and implementation oversight.	Forestry and Parks
Forest Resource Improvement Association of Alberta	Service Delivery	Promotes and starts projects to enhance Alberta's forest resources and the management of forest resources on public lands.	Forestry and Parks
Kananaskis Improvement District Council	Service Delivery	Provides local government and municipal services to residents of Kananaskis Country.	Forestry and Parks
Kazan Wildland Provincial Park Cooperative Management Board	Advisory	Provides recommendations on matters related to developing a park-specific management plan, and implementation oversight.	Forestry and Parks
Public Lands Appeal Board	Regulatory/Adjudicative	Hears appeals under Part 10 of the Public Lands Administration Regulation.	Forestry and Parks
Richardson Wildland Provincial Park Cooperative Management Board	Advisory	Provides recommendations on matters related to developing a park-specific management plan, and implementation oversight.	Forestry and Parks
Alberta College and Association of Chiropractors	Regulatory/Adjudicative	Directs and regulates the practice of chiropractors in Alberta.	Health
Alberta College and Association of Opticians	Regulatory/Adjudicative	Directs and regulates the practice of opticians in Alberta.	Health
Alberta College of Combined Laboratory and X-Ray Technologists	Regulatory/Adjudicative	Directs and regulates the practice of laboratory technologists and X-Ray technologists in Alberta.	Health
Alberta College of Medical Diagnostic and Therapeutic Technologists	Regulatory/Adjudicative	Directs and regulates the practice of medical diagnostic technologists and therapeutic technologists in Alberta.	Health
Alberta College of Occupational Therapists	Regulatory/Adjudicative	Directs and regulates the practice of occupational therapists in Alberta.	Health
Alberta College of Optometrists	Regulatory/Adjudicative	Directs and regulates the practice of optometrists in Alberta.	Health
Alberta College of Paramedics	Regulatory/Adjudicative	Directs and regulates the practice of paramedics in Alberta.	Health
Alberta College of Pharmacy	Regulatory/Adjudicative	Directs and regulates the practice of pharmacists in Alberta.	Health
Alberta College of Social Workers	Regulatory/Adjudicative	Directs and regulates the practice of social workers in Alberta.	Health
Alberta College of Speech-Language Pathologists and Audiologists	Regulatory/Adjudicative	Directs and regulates the practice of speech-language pathologists and audiologists in Alberta.	Health
Alberta Dental Association and College	Regulatory/Adjudicative	Directs and regulates the practice of dentists in Alberta.	Health
Alberta Health Services	Service Delivery	The centralized health authority and health service provider for the province of Alberta.	Health
College and Association of Registered Nurses of Alberta	Regulatory/Adjudicative	Directs and regulates the practice of registered nurses in Alberta.	Health
College and Association of Respiratory Therapists of Alberta	Regulatory/Adjudicative	Directs and regulates the practice of respiratory therapists in Alberta.	Health
College of Acupuncturists of Alberta	Regulatory/Adjudicative	Directs and regulates the practice of acupuncturists in Alberta.	Health
College of Alberta Dental Assistants	Regulatory/Adjudicative	Directs and regulates the practice of dental assistants in Alberta.	Health
College of Alberta Denturists	Regulatory/Adjudicative	Directs and regulates the practice of denturists in Alberta.	Health
College of Alberta Psychologists	Regulatory/Adjudicative	Directs and regulates the practice of psychologists in Alberta.	Health
College of Dental Technologists of Alberta	Regulatory/Adjudicative	Directs and regulates the practice of dental technologists in Alberta.	Health
College of Dietitians of Alberta	Regulatory/Adjudicative	Directs and regulates the practice of dietitians in Alberta.	Health
College of Hearing Aid Practitioners of Alberta	Regulatory/Adjudicative	Directs and regulates the practice of hearing aid practitioners in Alberta.	Health
College of Licensed Practical Nurses of Alberta	Regulatory/Adjudicative	Directs and regulates the practice of licensed practical nurses in Alberta.	Health
College of Medical Laboratory Technologists of Alberta	Regulatory/Adjudicative	Directs and regulates the practice of medical laboratory technicians in Alberta.	Health
College of Midwives of Alberta	Regulatory/Adjudicative	Directs and regulates the practice of midwives in Alberta.	Health
College of Naturopathic Doctors of Alberta	Regulatory/Adjudicative	Directs and regulates the practice of naturopaths in Alberta.	Health
College of Physicians and Surgeons of Alberta	Regulatory/Adjudicative	Directs and regulates the practice of physicians and surgeons in Alberta.	Health
College of Podiatric Physicians of Alberta	Regulatory/Adjudicative	Directs and regulates the practice of podiatric physicians in Alberta.	Health
College of Registered Dental Hygienists of Alberta	Regulatory/Adjudicative	Directs and regulates the practice of registered dental hygienists in Alberta.	Health
College of Registered Psychiatric Nurses of Alberta	Regulatory/Adjudicative	Directs and regulates the practice of registered psychiatric nurses in Alberta.	Health
Expert Committee on Drug Evaluation and Therapeutics	Advisory	Acts as the external drug advisory committee for the Minister, providing advice and recommendations on the therapeutic value and cost effectiveness of drug products.	Health
Health Information and Data Governance Committee (HIDGC)	Advisory	Provides advice to ensure the safety and protection of health information and data to support patient care, health system management, research, and program planning.	Health
Health Quality Council of Alberta	Service Delivery	Advises the Minister on the quality of provincial health services, monitors and assesses patient safety and service quality, makes recommendations to improve the strategies, programs, and delivery of safe and quality patient care.	Health
Hospital Privileges Appeal Board	Regulatory/Adjudicative	Hears appeals from members and former members of medical staff in hospitals.	Health
MSI Foundation Board of Trustees	Regulatory/Adjudicative	Provides grants and funding for research into the provision of medical and allied health services.	Health
Out-Of-Country Health Services Appeal Panel	Regulatory/Adjudicative	Hears appeals on decisions with respect to requests for payment for insured services and hospital services already received or to be received outside of Canada.	Health
Out-Of-Country Health Services Committee	Regulatory/Adjudicative	Reviews and makes decisions on applications for approval for funding of insured services or insured hospital services not available in Alberta or Canada.	Health
Physiotherapy Alberta College and Association	Regulatory/Adjudicative	Directs and regulates the practice of physiotherapists in Alberta.	Health
Provincial Primary Care Network Committee	Advisory	Advises the Minister on sustainable governance and leadership structures relating to primary care networks (PCNs), and integrates and aligns PCN policy, standards, and operations across Alberta.	Health
Public Health Appeal Board	Regulatory/Adjudicative	Hears appeals regarding decisions made by regional health authorities, such as the issuance, cancellation, suspension, or refusal to issue licenses or permits.	Health
Tribunal Roster of Public Members under the Health Professions Act	Regulatory/Adjudicative	List of public members who may be selected to sit on complaint review committees and hearing tribunals.	Health
Advisory Council on Alberta-Ukraine Relations	Advisory	Considers opportunities for cooperation on Alberta-Ukraine initiatives.	Immigration and Multiculturalism
Alberta Anti-Racism Advisory Council	Advisory	Advises the minister on combating racism and implementing anti-racism action items.	Immigration and Multiculturalism
Premier's Council on Multiculturalism	Advisory	Advises the Minister on ways to support multiculturalism, cultural exchange, cross-cultural understanding, education initiatives and public awareness, and inclusion.	Immigration and Multiculturalism
Alberta Indigenous Opportunities Corporation	Corporate Enterprise	Facilitates investment by Indigenous groups and companies into natural resource projects.	Indigenous Relations
First Nations Women's Council on Economic Security	Advisory	Provides advice on strengthening the economic security of First Nations women in Alberta.	Indigenous Relations
Metis Settlements Appeal Tribunal	Regulatory/Adjudicative	Resolves disputes through mediation, adjudication, public education regarding land disputes, membership in a Metis Settlement, surface access, and more.	Indigenous Relations
Metis Women's Council on Economic Security	Advisory	Provides advice on strengthening the economic security of Metis and Inuit women in Alberta.	Indigenous Relations
Premier's Council on Missing and Murdered Indigenous Women and Girls	Advisory	Advises and supports government initiatives related to Missing and Murdered Indigenous Women and Girls, violence against 2SLGBTQQIA+ people, and economic insecurity in Indigenous communities.	Indigenous Relations
Appeals Commission for Alberta Workers' Compensation	Regulatory/Adjudicative	Hears appeals for workers and employers who are dissatisfied with decisions made by the Workers' Compensation Board.	Jobs, Economy, and Trades
Alberta Labour Relations Board (ALRB)	Regulatory/Adjudicative	Administers, reviews, and rules on applications and filings related to Alberta's labour laws, including unionization votes, strike votes, and union busting.	Jobs, Economy, and Trades
Northern Alberta Development Council	Advisory	Provides advice on Northern developments, social and economic programs, and community and government services and program delivery.	Jobs, Economy, and Trades
Workers' Compensation Board	Service Delivery	Administers Alberta's workers' compensation program.	Jobs, Economy, and Trades
Alberta Human Rights Commission	Regulatory/Adjudicative	Responsible for education and engagement towards reducing discrimination, resolving human rights complaints; oversees the Human Rights Education and Multiculturalism Fund.	Justice
Alberta Law Foundation	Service Delivery	Uses funds collected from interest from lawyer's general trust accounts to support a variety of organizations undertaking public legal education, law libraries, law research and reform, Indigenous legal programs, and student legal aid programs.	Justice
Alberta Law Libraries	Service Delivery	Decision-making body for funding, setting governing policies, and overseeing the operations of Alberta Law Libraries.	Justice
Criminal Code Review Board	Regulatory/Adjudicative	Makes and reviews dispositions concerning accused persons for whom verdicts of "not criminally responsible because of mental disorder" or "unfit to stand trial".	Justice
Fatality Review Board	Advisory	Reviews investigations by the Office of the Chief Medical Examiner and makes recommendations on whether to hold public inquiries.	Justice
Judicial Council	Regulatory/Adjudicative	Considers appointment proposals for application judges, Provincial Court judges, and justices of the peace; deals with complaints against persons in these positions, enforces applicable conflict of interest and code of ethics regulations.	Justice
Law Society of Alberta	Regulatory/Adjudicative	Promotes high standards, professional conduct, and independence of the legal profession in Alberta; provides recommendations on continuing professional development and education criteria.	Justice
Notaries Public Advisory Committee	Advisory	Reviews requests for appointment of Notaries Public in Alberta.	Justice
Provincial Court Nominating Committee	Advisory	Selects candidates, interviews, and makes recommendations for Provincial Court judge appointments from a list of candidates provided by the Judicial Council.	Justice
Rules of Court Committee	Regulatory/Adjudicative	Makes recommendations to the Minister on amendments to the Alberta Rules of Court.	Justice
Mental Health Review Panel Roster	Regulatory/Adjudicative	Hears appeals from former patients certified by the Mental Health Act relating to competency to make treatment decisions (including objections to treatment), returns to correctional facilities, cancellation/admission/review of renewal certificates.	Mental Health and Addiction
Alberta Boilers Safety Association	Regulatory/Adjudicative	Administers and enforces Alberta's pressure equipment safety programs and standards.	Municipal Affairs
Alberta Elevating Devices and Amusement Rides Safety Association (AEDARSA)	Regulatory/Adjudicative	Administers specified safety services pertaining to elevators, escalators, dumbwaiters, freight platform lifts, man lifts, passenger ropeways, personnel hoists, liftsfor persons with physical disabilities, amusement rides, and all other 'elevating devices'.	Municipal Affairs
Calgary Metropolitan Regional Board	Advisory	Promotes sustainability, environmentally responsible land-use planning, growth management, regional infrastructure policies, service deliveries, and economic profitability of the Calgary Metropolitan Region.	Municipal Affairs
Edmonton Metropolitan Regional Board	Advisory	Promotes sustainability, environmentally responsible land-use planning, growth management, regional infrastructure policies, service deliveries, and economic profitability of the Edmonton Metropolitan Region.	Municipal Affairs
Land and Property Rights Tribunal (LRPT)	Regulatory/Adjudicative	Quasi-judicial tribunal that adjudicates issues of surface rights, expropriation, assessment, subdivision, development, and inter-municipal disputes.	Municipal Affairs
Safety Codes Council (SCC)	Regulatory/Adjudicative	Reviews and formulates codes and standards for all things, processes, and activities covered by the Safety Codes Act. Administers the accreditation of safety permitting and inspection services, hears appeals, and administers provincial electronic permit system.	Municipal Affairs
Special Areas Board	Service Delivery	Manages the public lands and delivers municipal services to communities within Special Area No. 2, Special Area No. 3, and Special Area No. 4.	Municipal Affairs
Alberta Parole Board	Regulatory/Adjudicative	Responsible for making parole decisions for inmates serving sentences of less than two years in provincial correction facilities.	Public Safety and Emergency Services
Law Enforcement Review Board	Regulatory/Adjudicative	Reviews public complaints about municipal police officer conduct, and hears appeals of disciplinary actions taken by Chiefs of Police against officers or Peace Officers who have had their appointments cancelled.	Public Safety and Emergency Services
Public Security Indigenous Advisory Committee	Advisory	Advises government on public security issues, including policing and peace officer standards, harvesting rights, restorative justice, and victim services.	Public Safety and Emergency Services
Victims of Crime and Public Safety Programs Committee	Advisory	Evaluates grant funding applications, and provides information on services and programs for victims of crime.	Public Safety and Emergency Services
Classification Appeal Board	Regulatory/Adjudicative	Hears appeals by non-management provincial government employees regarding job evaluation decisions.	Public Service Commission
Management Job Evaluation Appeal Board	Regulatory/Adjudicative	Hears appeals by provincial government management employees of job evaluation decisions.	Public Service Commission
Alberta Social Housing Corporation	Corporate Enterprise	Responsible for the provision of basic housing accommodation for all Albertans, especially those requiring social support or assistance. Also owns and administers 26,000 provincially-owned rental units in seniors' lodges and social housing, though is currently privatizing the majority of these.	Seniors, Community, and Social Services
Citizens' Appeal Panel (CAP)	Regulatory/Adjudicative	Hears appeals and renders decisions regarding AISH and other social assistance program claims and disputes.	Seniors, Community, and Social Services
Family Support for Children with Disabilities (FSCD) Provincial Parent Advisory Committee (PPAC)	Advisory	FSCD administers and advises policies regarding child-focused services and support programs for children with disabilities; PPAC represents parents of children with disabilities and advises the government and FSCD on their behalf.	Seniors, Community, and Social Services
Premiers' Council on Charities and Civil Society (PCCCS)	Advisory	Advises and engages civil society leaders, organizations, and government on building civil society capacity and social enterprises.	Seniors, Community, and Social Services
Premiers' Council on the Status of Persons with Disabilities	Advisory	Advises and provides recommendations to government on issues, programs, policies, and services pertaining to persons with disabilities.	Seniors, Community, and Social Services
Alberta Funeral Services Regulatory Board	Regulatory/Adjudicative	Regulates funeral businesses, directors, embalmers, and salespeople; setting and enforcing standards of conduct, licensing, education criteria; and monitoring, investigating, and enforcing funeral trust accounts and complaints.	Service Alberta and Red Tape Reduction
Alberta Gaming, Liquor and Cannabis Commission (AGLC)	Corporate Enterprise	Conducts and manages provincial lotteries, controls the manufacture, import, sale, purchase, possession, storage, transportation, use, and consumption of liquor and cannabis.	Service Alberta and Red Tape Reduction
Alberta Motor Vehicle Industry Council (AMVIC)	Regulatory/Adjudicative	Administers the Fair Trading Act in automotive industry by: regulating the sale, lease, cosigning, and repair of motor vehicles, enforcing standards of conduct, licensing industry members, establishing education criteria, and investigating and enforcing complaints.	Service Alberta and Red Tape Reduction
Credit Counselling Services of Alberta (operating as Money Mentors)	Service Delivery	Responsible for administering the Orderly Payment of Debts program and providing financial literacy materials and programs.	Service Alberta and Red Tape Reduction
Debtors' Assistance Board	Service Delivery	Responsible for administering the Orderly Payment of Debts program.	Service Alberta and Red Tape Reduction
Horse Racing Alberta	Regulatory/Adjudicative	Responsible for governing, directing, controlling, regulating, managing, and promoting horse racing; protecting the health, safety and welfare of racehorses, racing participants, and racing officials.	Service Alberta and Red Tape Reduction
Horse Racing Appeal Tribunal	Regulatory/Adjudicative	Reviews appeals of rulings and directions of racing officials.	Service Alberta and Red Tape Reduction
Real Estate Council of Alberta (RECA)	Regulatory/Adjudicative	Administers the Real Estate Act, regulates real estate and mortgage brokers, property managers, and appraisers; sets and enforces standards of conduct; licenses industry members, establishes education criteria, monitors industry member trust accounts, administers the Real Estate Assurance Fund, and investigates and enforces complaints.	Service Alberta and Red Tape Reduction
Alberta Enterprise Corporation Board	Public Trust	Developing and investing in venture capital funds for technology, innovation, and knowledge sectors in Alberta, including: information and communications technology, life sciences, nanotechnology, and environmental technology.	Technology and Innovation
Alberta Innovates	Service Delivery	Responsible for funding and conducting research and development projects, and promoting 'innovation' in Alberta. It has two subsidiaries, InnoTech Alberta and C-FER Technologies.	Technology and Innovation
Alberta Research and Innovation Advisory Committee	Advisory	Provides strategic advice and recommendations regarding innovation and research.	Technology and Innovation
Travel Alberta	Service Delivery	Acts as a marketing agency for Alberta's tourism sector and tourism industry companies in domestic, national, and international markets.	Tourism and Sport
Strategic Aviation Advisory Council (SAAC)	Advisory	Responsible for providing advice, research, analysis, and consultation in order to increase economic development and market expansion in the aviation and aerospace sectors.	Transportation and Economic Corridors
Alberta Accreditation Committee	Regulatory/Adjudicative	Overseeing, reviewing, approving providers of continuing education and annual courses that brokers, agents, and adjusters must attend to stay licensed.	Treasury Board and Finance
Alberta Employment Pension Tribunal	Regulatory/Adjudicative	Hears certain appeals made by pension plan administrators, and can inquire into, hear, and determine all matters relating to decisions made by the Superintendent of Pensions.	Treasury Board and Finance
Alberta Insurance Council	Regulatory/Adjudicative	The financial arm for the four insurance councils (Alberta Insurance Council, Insurance Adjusters' Council, General Insurance Council, and Life Insurance Council).	Treasury Board and Finance
Alberta Investment Management Corporation (AIMCo)	Public Trust	Oversees investments for government-owned funds, Alberta's public sector pension plans, and other public entities.	Treasury Board and Finance
Alberta Pensions Services (APS) Corporation	Service Delivery	Administers public service pension plans, provides services and supports for group benefit programs, and secretariat services for certain pension boards and committees.	Treasury Board and Finance
Alberta Securities Commission	Regulatory/Adjudicative	Responsible for making, administering, enforcing, and adjudicating provincial securities laws.	Treasury Board and Finance
ATB Financial	Corporate Enterprise	Provides core financial and banking services.	Treasury Board and Finance
Audit Committee	Advisory	Provides advice to the government and Auditor General on issues including financial statement presentation and disclosure, accounting policies, non-financial performance information, and the Auditor General's reports.	Treasury Board and Finance
Automobile Insurance Rate Board	Regulatory/Adjudicative	Reviews automobile insurance rates, ratings, and coverage programs.	Treasury Board and Finance
Credit Union Deposit Guarantee Corporation	Regulatory/Adjudicative	Oversees and regulates the business practices of Alberta credit unions and guarantee deposits.	Treasury Board and Finance
General Insurance Council	Regulatory/Adjudicative	Responsible for licensing and disciplining general insurance agents.	Treasury Board and Finance
Insurance Adjusters' Council	Regulatory/Adjudicative	Responsible for licensing and disciplining insurance adjusters.	Treasury Board and Finance
Insurance Councils Appeal Board	Regulatory/Adjudicative	Hears appeals of decisions for the three councils that regulate insurance professionals in Alberta (Insurance Adjusters' Council, General Insurance Council, and Life Insurance Council).	Treasury Board and Finance
Local Authorities Pension Plan (LAPP) Corporation	Public Trust	Administers the LAPP, the largest pension plan in Alberta, which in 2022 had $58.7 billion in assets. The plan covers over 290,000 employees of 437 employers in Alberta, including municipalities, colleges, school boards, non-profits/not-for-profits, charities, other public sector entities, and for-profit corporations.	Treasury Board and Finance
Life Insurance Council	Regulatory/Adjudicative	Responsible for licensing and disciplining life insurance agents.	Treasury Board and Finance
Management Employees Pension Plan (MEPP) Board	Public Trust	Reviews the actions of the administrator (APS) and investment manager (AIMCo) of pension plans for managers in government agencies, certain post-secondary institutions, and other public services.	Treasury Board and Finance
Public Service Pension Plan (PSPP) Corporation	Public Trust	Reviews the actions of the administrator (APS) and investment manager (AIMCo) of pension plans for employees of the government, certain public agencies, post-secondary institutions, and other public employees.	Treasury Board and Finance
Special Forces Pension Plan (SFPP) Corporation	Public Trust	Reviews the actions of the administrator (APS) and investment manager (AIMCo) of pension plans for municipal police officers in Alberta, including: Calgary Police Service, Camrose Police Service, Edmonton Police Service, Lacombe Police Service, Lethbridge Police Service, Medicine Hat Police Service, and Taber Police Service.	Treasury Board and Finance
Alberta Teachers' Retirement Fund (ATRF) Board	Public Trust	Acts as trustee, administrator, and custodian of the Teachers' Pension Plan (TPP) and the Private School Teachers' Pension Plan (PSTPP) for teachers and other education workers in Alberta.	Treasury Board and Finance
