= Local Authorities Pension Plan =

LAPP

LAPP
- Trade name: LAPP
- Type: Private
- Industry: Pension fund
- Founded: 1962; 64 years ago
- Headquarters: Edmonton, Alberta
- Area served: Participating employers and employees in Alberta, Canada
- Key people: Troy Mann (President and CEO)
- Total assets: C$70.7 billion (2024)
- Parent: LAPP Corporation
- Website: lapp.ca

LAPP, formerly known by its expanded acronym, the Local Authorities Pension Plan, is the largest pension plan in Alberta.

With 316,938 members and $70.7 billion in assets (2024), LAPP is a multi-employer jointly sponsored defined benefit pension plan. Dedicated to helping every member retire with dignity, the plan provides a predictable and secure retirement income for life.

LAPP Corporation is the legal Trustee and Administrator of the Plan and is supported by the over 400 employees of its pension benefits services provider Alberta Pensions Services Corporation (APS) and the over 600 employees of its investment management services provider Alberta Investment Management Corporation (AIMCo).

== Organization ==
Originally established in 1962 for the employees of local authorities, LAPP now includes 453 employers (2024) from the healthcare sectors, cities, towns, villages, summer villages, municipal districts, colleges, school boards, non-profits/not-for-profits, charities, other public sector entities, and for-profit corporations.

LAPP Corporation is overseen by a 12-director Board of Directors, nominated by employer and employee groups. This Corporate Board and LAPP Corporation are responsible for the administration of the pension benefits and to ensure that retirement income is paid to members, which is done by providing strategic guidance for the Plan, managing risk, and ensuring the long-term sustainability of LAPP. A 12-member Sponsor Board, whose members are appointed as representatives of the members (employees) and employers, is legislated to make decisions about plan design, employer eligibility rules, and contribution rates.

LAPP is registered under the Alberta Employment Pension Plans Act (EPPA), requiring it meet the rules and standards set out by Employment Pension Plans Regulations. The Joint Governance of Public Sector Pension Plans Act transitioned LAPP to joint governance effective March, 2019.

LAPP Corporation has a fiduciary duty and responsibility to act in the best interests of LAPP's members. Contributions are collected from employers and employees and the money is invested provincially, nationally, and globally in fixed income, public and private equities, real estate, infrastructure, natural resources, bonds, and other investment vehicles by its investment management services provider, AIMCo, in accordance with LAPP Corporation's Statement of Investment Policies and Procedures (SIPP). Interest, investment returns, and contributions are used to pay lifetime retirement income (pension benefits, often termed the pension promise) to current and future LAPP retirees.

== History ==
- 1962: LAPP is established as the Local Authorities Pension Plan with a flat accrual benefit equal to 2% of a member's salary.
- 1964: Contribution rates are first integrated with the Canada Pension Plan (CPP) up to the Year's Maximum Pensionable Earnings.
- 1969: The first Cost-of-Living Adjustment (COLA) payments are issued to retirees.
- 1973: The first Board of Trustees is formed as Administrator and Trustee of the Plan.
- 1981: The first public plan pension fund is created. Prior to this employer and employee contributions were pooled in the Government of Alberta (GoA) General Revenue Fund.
- 1985: The Local Authorities Pension Act was repealed and replaced with the Local Authorities Pension Plan Act.
- 1992–93: Provincial pension reforms led to the Public Sector Pension Plans Act (PSPPA), which created a separate LAPP fund, LAPP employers and members became jointly responsible for funding the Plan, removed the government as a guarantor of the Plan and Fund for new service, and outlined independence for the pension plan with a three-party agreement.
- 1997: The Board voted to terminate statutory LAPP and to reestablish the Plan by January 1, 2000.
- 1998: The Board completed draft Plan Text and a Declaration of Trust. PSPPA changes were made to employer withdrawal.
- 1999: The Plan's move to self-governance has a renewed review target date of 2001.
- 2001: Memorandum of Understanding (MoU) on self-governance was signed by stakeholders and sent to the government for review with the target date reset to 2002.
- 2004: The Board creates an informal role for Plan sponsors by creating the Stakeholder Consultation Group (SCG).
- 2005: The government announces two phases of reform.
- 2006: Phase One reform involves the creation of ALAPP Corporation to support the Plan.
- 2006–11: The Board and stakeholders continue to seek self-governance. Phase Two is never implemented.
- 2011: The Board offers to lead the process for the creation of a task force to reform governance.
- 2012: A Plan review is led by the government.
- 2013–14: The Public Sector Wage Arbitration Act (Bill 9) is tabled.
- 2015: A newly appointed Minister of Finance calls for consultation, which is delayed by the pre-election Red Zone.
- 2015–18: A coalition negotiates an agreement for self-governance and independence on behalf of the public pension plan sponsors.
- 2018: The government and the plans reach an agreement and new pension legislation is passed, setting an effective date for joint-governance.
- 2019: In March, LAPP becomes a jointly governed plan, giving the responsibility for decisions and risks of the Plan to the employer and employee groups contributing to the pension. In November, the Joint Governance of Public Sector Pension Plans Act (Bill 22) is passed, and governance provisions for LAPP are changed. Two crown corporations, AIMCo and APS, are mandated by legislation as respectively the investment management services provider and benefits administration services provider for LAPP.
- 2025: Stakeholder Consultation Group (SCG) changes its name to LAPP Consultation Meeting (LCM).
- 2025: Advantage Estimator, a new calculator, is launched giving potential pension members a personal estimate of how much pension they could receive as a retiree.
