= Red Zone =

Red Zone or redzone may refer to:

== Places ==
- Red Zone (Iraq), unsafe areas in Iraq after the 2003 invasion
- Red Zone (Islamabad), the area encompassing Pakistan's national government buildings
- Red Zone (World War I) (French: Zone rouge), a region of France heavily damaged during World War I
- Red corridor, location of a Maoist insurgency in India
- Residential red zone, any of several areas of land zoned unsuitable for housing after the 2011 Christchurch, New Zealand, earthquakes
  - Central City Red Zone, a temporary public exclusion zone in Christchurch
- Quarantined areas in Northern Italy during the COVID-19 pandemic (see COVID-19 pandemic in Italy#First_measures)
- Italian volcanic evacuation zones (Italian: zona rossa)
  - Vesuvius red zone, high-risk area surrounding Mount Vesuvius that will be evacuated in the case of an imminent eruption
  - Phlegraean Fields red zone, high-risk area within Naples that will be evacuated in the case of an imminent eruption

== Media and entertainment ==
- Red Zone (card game), a Donruss/NXT Games collectible card game
- Red Zone (G.I. Joe), a fictional character
- Red Zone (1992 video game), a racing game by Psygnosis
- Red Zone (1994 video game), a shooter game by Zyrinx
- Redzone, a band from London, UK
- "RED ZONE", a song from the video game Beatmania IIDX 11 IIDXRED

=== Film and television ===
- NFL RedZone, an American television football channel
- Red Zone Channel, a football channel offered as part of DirecTV's NFL Sunday Ticket
- Zone rouge (film) (English: Red zone), a 1985 French movie by Robert Enrico
- Zone Rouge, the French version of the TV game show The Chair

== Sports ==
- Red zone (gridiron football), in American football the area within the 20 yard line of the defensive team
- Red zone (rugby league), an obsolete term in rugby league

== Other uses ==
- Red zone (computing), a part of the stack in a central processing unit, or CPU
- The Red Zone, a term referring to spikes in college campus sexual assault incidents that occur in the fall semester

== See also ==
- Red states and blue states, designating the voting preferences of US states
