= Alberta Justice =

Cabinet ministry responsible for legal device

Ministry of Justice
- The Government of Alberta wordmark

Ministry overview
- Formed: 2012
- Preceding agencies: Ministry of Justice and Attorney General; Ministry of the Solicitor General and Public Security
- Jurisdiction: Province of Alberta
- Minister responsible: Mickey Amery, Minister of Justice
- Child agencies: Alberta Human Rights Commission; Alberta Sheriffs Branch; Alberta Serious Incident Response Team
- Website: www.alberta.ca/justice

The Ministry of Justice of Alberta, commonly called Alberta Justice, is the Cabinet ministry responsible for providing legal advice and overseeing provincial law enforcement to the government of Alberta, Canada. The ministry was created in 2012 by merging the Ministry of Justice and Attorney General and Ministry of the Solicitor General and Public Security. It was formerly called Alberta Justice and Solicitor General from 2012 to 2022.

The current Minister of Justice is Mickey Amery since June 9, 2023.

== List of ministers ==
- Jonathan Denis 2012–2015
- Kathleen Ganley 2015–2019
- Doug Schweitzer 2019–2020
- Kaycee Madu 2020–2022
- Tyler Shandro 2022–2023
- Mickey Amery 2023–present

For list of ministers for two separate preceding posts see:

- Attorneys General of Alberta
- Solicitors General of Alberta

== See also ==
- Justice ministry
- Politics of Alberta
