= Calgary-Acadia =

Provincial electoral district in Alberta, Canada

Alberta electoral district
- Calgary-Acadia within the City of Calgary, 2017 boundaries

Provincial electoral district
- Legislature: Legislative Assembly of Alberta
MLA
Diana Batten
New Democratic
- District created: 2010
- First contested: 2012
- Last contested: 2023

Calgary-Acadia is a current provincial electoral district in Calgary, Alberta, Canada. Created in 2010, the district is one of 87 districts mandated to return a single member (MLA) to the Legislative Assembly of Alberta using the first past the post method of voting.

== History ==
The Calgary-Acadia electoral district was created in the 2010 Alberta boundary re-distribution. It was created primarily from the old electoral district of Calgary-Egmont and a portion of Calgary-Glenmore. Egmont also had some other areas redistributed to Glenmore and Calgary-Fort. When created in 2010, the Calgary-Acadia electoral district would have a population of 37,718, which was 7.7% below the provincial average of 40,880.

Minor adjustments to the district occurred in the 2017 electoral boundaries re-distribution, the district would be reunited with North Glenmore Park, and three communities belonging to the same community association and equalizing variances to a degree among the constituencies of Calgary-Acadia, Calgary-Elbow and Calgary-Glenmore. In the result, the Chinook Park community would be moved out of Calgary-Acadia and into Calgary-Glenmore. Further, Bow River would no longer bisect the constituency and, instead, would largely form its eastern boundary. The boundaries as adjusted would give the electoral district a population of 48,966 in 2017, 5% above the provincial average of 46,803.

=== Boundary history ===
03 Calgary-Acadia 2010 Boundaries
Bordering Districts
North	East	West	South
Calgary-Buffalo	Calgary-Fort and Calgary-Hays	Calgary-Elbow, Calgary-Glenmore and Calgary-Lougheed	Calgary-Fish Creek
Note: Boundary descriptions were not used in the 2010 redistribution

=== Representation history ===
Calgary-Acadia
Assembly	Years	Member	Party
Riding created from Calgary-Egmont and Calgary-Glenmore
28th	2012–2015	Jonathan Denis	Progressive Conservative
29th	2015–2019	Brandy Payne	New Democratic
30th	2019–2023	Tyler Shandro	United Conservative
31st	2023–Present	Diana Batten	New Democratic

The Calgary-Acadia electoral district would elect the incumbent from the abolished Calgary-Egmont electoral district, Progressive Conservative Jonathan Denis in the 2012 Alberta general election. Denis would defeat his closest opponent Wildrose candidate Richard Jones by 555 votes. Denis had previously served as the Minister of Housing and Urban Affairs from 2010 to 2011, and Solicitor General and Minister of Public Security from 2011 to 2012. Following the 2012 election Dennis would be appointed Minister of Justice, Attorney General and Solicitor General. Denis would hold the position until April 2015, when he would resign after being sued by his estranged wife on false allegations of abuse. The Court of Queen's Bench would ultimately find the allegations unfounded in February 2019 and that Palmer "lied to the Court under oath" with the intent of defrauding Denis out of $1,000,000.00.

The 2015 Alberta general election would see NDP candidate Brandy Payne defeat PC incumbent Jonathan Denis and Wildrose candidate Linda Carlson as part of the "Orange Crush" which saw the 40 year Progressive Conservative dynasty end, and the NDP form government in Alberta. The incumbent Jonathan Denis would finish third. Payne would win the election despite spending only $240 during the campaign, well under Denis' total of $79,171.

Prior to the 2019 Alberta general election, incumbent Brandy Payne would announce she would not be seeking re-election, and instead would spend more time with her family. United Conservative Party of Alberta candidate Tyler Shandro would go on to defeat NDP candidate Kate Andrews by 4,567 votes. Shandro would be appointed Minister of Health by Premier Jason Kenney.

Shandro lost his seat in the 2023 Alberta general election to Diana Batten from the NDP.

== Legislative elections results ==
=== 2023 ===
2023 Alberta general election
Party	Candidate	Votes	%	±%
New Democratic	Diana Batten	10,958	48.58	+13.93
United Conservative	Tyler Shandro	10,933	48.47	-5.84
Green	Paul Bechthold	293	1.29	+0.25
Independent	Larry R. Heather	163	0.72	–
Wildrose Loyalty Coalition	Donna Kathleen Scott	119	0.53	–
Solidarity Movement	Linda McClelland	92	0.41	–
Total		22,558	99.24	–
Rejected and declined		173	0.76	
Turnout		22,731	64.29	
Eligible electors		35,355		
New Democratic gain from United Conservative		Swing		+9.88
Source(s) Source: Elections Alberta

=== 2019 ===
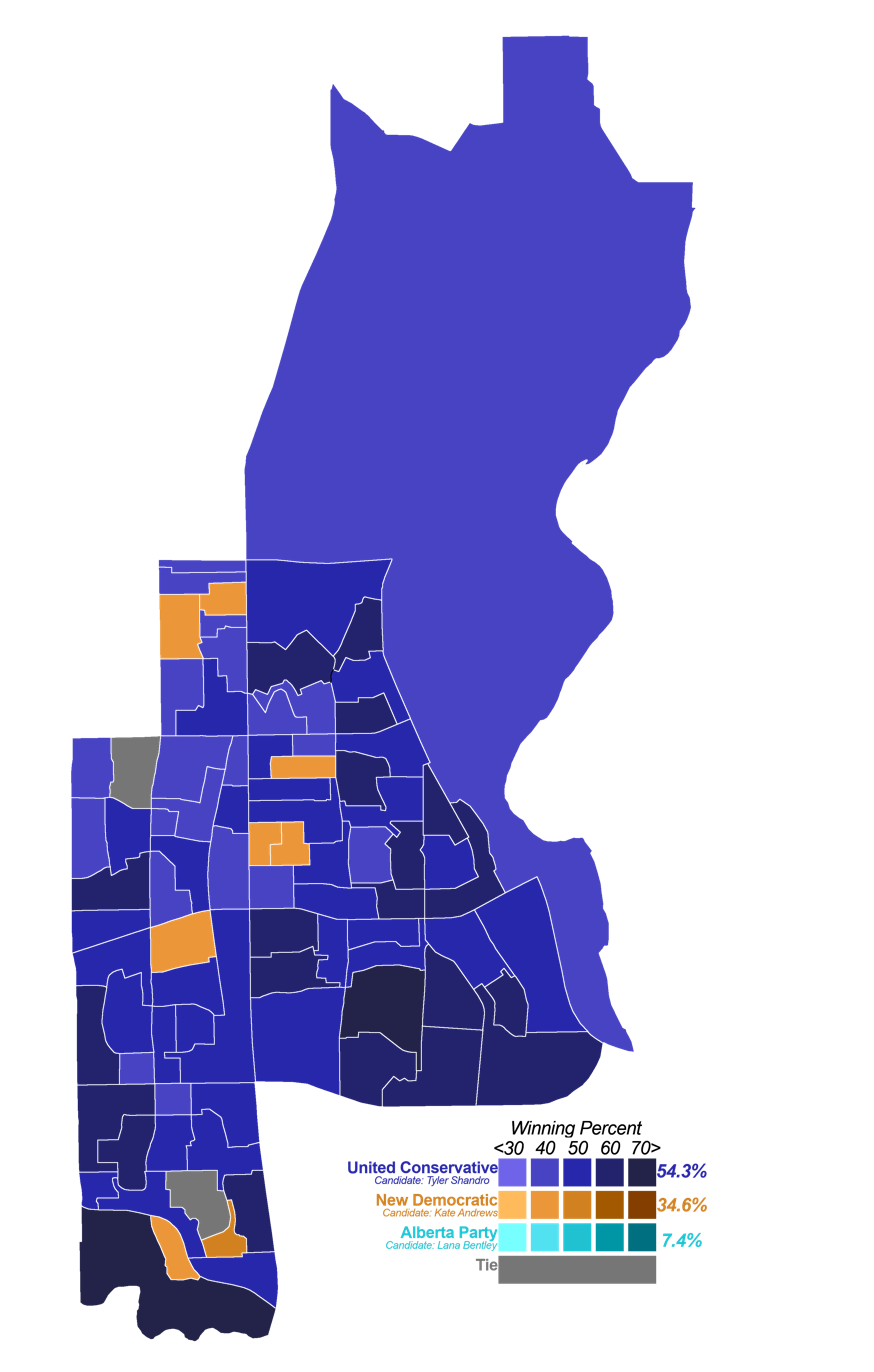
Results by polling division

2019 Alberta general election
Party	Candidate	Votes	%	±%	Expenditures
United Conservative	Tyler Shandro	12,615	54.30	-3.45	$117,646
New Democratic	Kate Andrews	8,049	34.65	-1.04	$37,925
Alberta Party	Lana Bentley	1,728	7.44	+5.69	$8,020
Liberal	Lorissa Good	350	1.51	-3.19	$500
Alberta Independence	Patrick Reilly	245	1.05	–	$8,243
Green	Amanda Bishop	243	1.05	–	$500
Total		23,230	99.23	–	
Rejected, spoiled and declined		180	0.77		
Turnout		23,410	67.60		
Eligible voters		34,632			
United Conservative notional hold		Swing		-1.21	
Source(s) Source: Elections Alberta Note: Expenses is the sum of "Election Expenses", "Other Expenses" and "Transfers Issued". The Elections Act limits "Election Expenses" to $50,000.

=== 2015 ===
2015 Alberta general election
Party	Candidate	Votes	%	±%
New Democratic	Brandy Payne	5,506	34.72%	30.20%
Wildrose	Linda Carlson	4,985	31.44%	-10.65%
Progressive Conservative	Jonathan Denis	4,602	29.02%	-16.76%
Liberal	Nicholas Borovsky	765	4.82%	-1.45%
Total		15,858	–	–
Rejected, spoiled and declined		113	–	–
Eligible electors / turnout		29,264	54.58%	-2.06%
New Democratic gain from Progressive Conservative		Swing		-0.21%
Source(s) Source: "03 - Calgary-Acadia, 2015 Alberta general election". officialresults.elections.ab.ca. Elections Alberta.

2015 Alberta general election redistributed results
Party	Votes	%
New Democratic	7,058	35.69
Progressive Conservative	5,797	29.31
Wildrose	5,625	28.44
Liberal	929	4.70
Alberta Party	346	1.75
Social Credit	21	0.11
Source(s) Source: Ridingbuilder

=== 2012 ===
2012 Alberta general election
Party	Candidate	Votes	%	±%
Progressive Conservative	Jonathan Denis	6,863	45.78%	–
Wildrose	Richard Jones	6,308	42.08%	–
Liberal	Nicole Hankel	940	6.27%	–
New Democratic	Nick Lepora	677	4.52%	–
Evergreen	Antoni (Tony) Grochowski	202	1.35%	–
Total		14,990	–	–
Rejected, spoiled and declined		117	–	–
Eligible electors / turnout		26,675	56.63%	–
Progressive Conservative pickup new district.				
Source(s) Source: "03 - Calgary-Acadia, 2012 Alberta general election". officialresults.elections.ab.ca. Elections Alberta.

== Student vote results ==
=== 2012 ===
2012 Alberta student vote results
Affiliation	Candidate	Votes	%
Progressive Conservative	Jonathan Denis	341	33.46%
Wildrose	Richard Jones	319	31.31%
Liberal	Nicole Hankel	171	16.78%
New Democratic	Nick Lepora	98	9.62%
Evergreen	Antoni Grochowski	90	8.83%
Total		1,019	100%

== See also ==
- List of Alberta provincial electoral districts
- Canadian provincial electoral districts
