= Brandy Payne =

Canadian politician

The Honourable Brandy Payne ECA
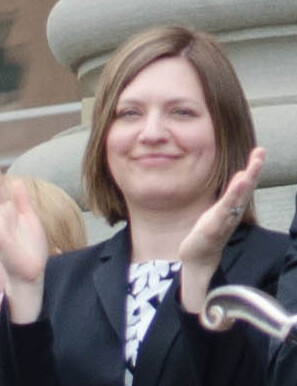
- Payne in 2015

Member of the Legislative Assembly of Alberta for Calgary-Acadia
- In office May 5, 2015 – March 19, 2019
- Preceded by: Jonathan Denis
- Succeeded by: Tyler Shandro

Personal details
- Born: 1978 (age 47–48) Calgary, Alberta
- Party: Alberta New Democratic Party
- Occupation: Yoga Instructor

Brandy Payne ECA (born 1978) is a Canadian politician elected in the 2015 Alberta general election to the Legislative Assembly of Alberta representing the electoral district of Calgary-Acadia. On February 2, 2016, Payne was appointed Associate Minister of Health, assigned with implementing the recommendations of mental health review and the growing opioid crisis.

== Background ==
Payne earned a journalism degree from Carleton University, where she graduated with high honours. She also attended Mount Royal University with a focus on Project Management. Prior to her election, Payne worked in administrative and management capacities for over 15 years, and as owner and operator of her own yoga business since 2010.

In the 2015 election, Payne beat former Tory cabinet minister Jonathan Denis, despite being outspent $79,171 to $240 during the campaign.

Prior to her cabinet appointment, Payne served as deputy chair of the Select Special Ethics and Accountability Committee. She is also a past member of the Standing Committee on Public Accounts and the Standing Committee on Families and Communities.

Payne joined Stephanie McLean as the first pregnant women in Alberta to hold cabinet posts. She and her husband, Scott, are raising two young daughters. On March 29, 2018, Payne announced that she would not seek re-election in 2019.

== Electoral record ==
2015 Alberta general election: Calgary-Acadia
| Party | Candidate | Votes | % | ±% |
|---|---|---|---|---|
| New Democratic | Brandy Payne | 5,506 | 34.72% | 30.20% |
| Wildrose | Linda Carlson | 4,985 | 31.44% | -10.65% |
| Progressive Conservative | Jonathan Denis | 4,602 | 29.02% | -16.76% |
| Liberal | Nicholas Borovsky | 765 | 4.82% | -1.45% |
| Total | | 15,858 | – | – |
| Rejected, spoiled and declined | | 113 | – | – |
| Eligible electors / turnout | | 29,264 | 54.58% | -2.06% |
| New Democratic gain from Progressive Conservative | | Swing | | -0.21% |
Source(s) Source: "03 - Calgary-Acadia, 2015 Alberta general election". officialresults.elections.ab.ca. Elections Alberta.
