= Diana Batten =

Canadian politician from Alberta

Diana Batten MLA
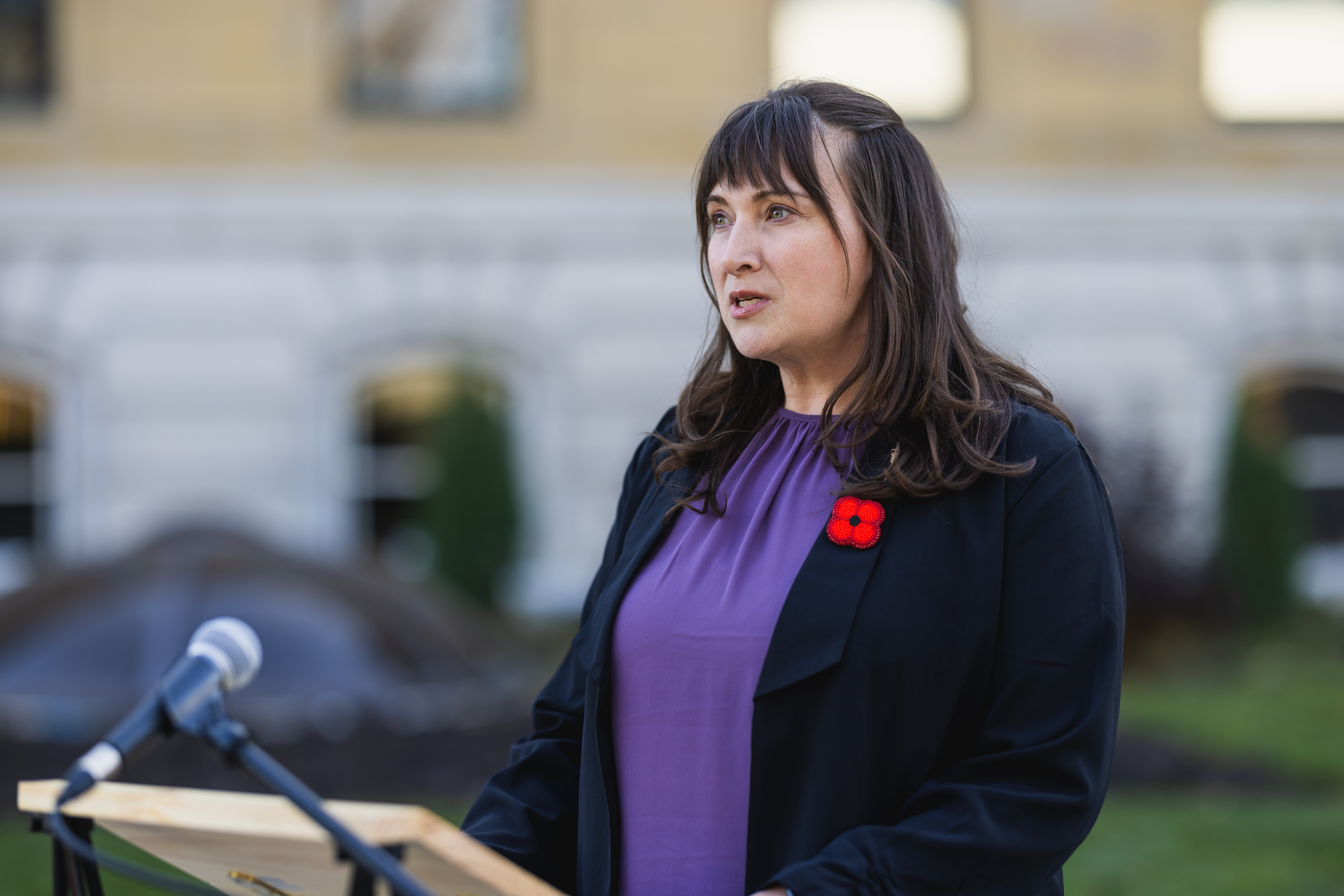
- Batten outside the Alberta Legislature

Member of the Legislative Assembly of Alberta for Calgary-Acadia
- Incumbent
- Assumed office May 29, 2023
- Preceded by: Tyler Shandro

Personal details
- Born: Saskatoon, Saskatchewan
- Party: Alberta New Democratic Party
- Occupation: Registered nurse, educator, businessperson, research scientist

Diana Batten is a Canadian politician from the Alberta New Democratic Party who was elected as a Member of the Legislative Assembly of Alberta for Calgary-Acadia in the 2023 Alberta general election, defeating incumbent Tyler Shandro in a judicial recount. As of June 21, 2024, she serves as Official Opposition critic for Childcare and for Child and Family Services.

Batten has worked as a research scientist, registered nurse and educator.

== Electoral history ==
2023 Alberta general election: Calgary-Acadia
Party	Candidate	Votes	%	±%
New Democratic	Diana Batten	10,958	48.58	+13.93
United Conservative	Tyler Shandro	10,933	48.47	-5.84
Green	Paul Bechthold	293	1.29	+0.25
Independent	Larry R. Heather	163	0.72	–
Wildrose Loyalty Coalition	Donna Kathleen Scott	119	0.53	–
Solidarity Movement	Linda McClelland	92	0.41	–
Total		22,558	99.24	–
Rejected and declined		173	0.76	
Turnout		22,731	64.29	
Eligible electors		35,355		
New Democratic gain from United Conservative		Swing		+9.88
Source(s) Source: Elections Alberta
