= Ministry of Health (Alberta) =

Canadian state government agency

Agency overview
- Formed: April 19, 1919
- Jurisdiction: Alberta
- Headquarters: Edmonton, Alberta
- Annual budget: C$23,723,236 (March 31, 2023)
- Agency executives: Adriana LaGrange, Minister of Health; Mike Ellis, Associate Minister of Mental Health and Addictions
- Website: https://www.alberta.ca/health

Alberta's Ministry of Health is a ministry of the Executive Council of Alberta whose major responsibilities include setting "policy and direction to achieve a sustainable and accountable health system to promote and protect the health of Albertans."

On April 16, 2019, Tyler Shandro replaced Sarah Hoffman as Minister of Health following the 2019 Alberta general election.

On June 9, 2023, Adriana LaGrange replaced Jason Copping as Minister of Health.

The annual budget as of March 31, 2023, was C$23,723,236.

The Edmonton, Alberta-headquartered Alberta Health Services (AHS), was established in 2008 as the "first province-wide, fully integrated health system" in Canada. AHS delivers medical care on behalf of the Government of Alberta's Ministry of Health. AHS serves 4.3 million Albertans and has a staff of 125,000 staff and 10,000 physicians.

On May 16, 2025, the Ministry of Health was split into the Ministry of Primary and Preventative Health Services, Ministry of Hospital and Surgical Health Services, Ministry of Mental Health and Addiction, and Ministry of Assisted Living and Social Services.

== History ==
The Department of Public Health was established on April 19, 1919 by the Department of Public Health Act, to replace the Public Health Branch of the Department of Municipal Affairs. In 1967, the name was changed to the Department of Health. In 1971, during the premiership of Progressive Conservative Peter Lougheed who served as the premier from 1971 to 1985, the Department of Health was dissolved by the Department of Health and Social Development Act, when the departments of Health and Social Development were merged to become the Department of Health and Social Development. In 1975, this department was renamed Social Services and Community Health. And from 1975 to 1988 a separate Department of Hospitals and Medical Care also existed, separate from community health. Between 1971 and 1988, the administration of most community health programs shifted to six regional offices.

In 1988, during the Progressive Conservative premiership of Don Getty, the Department of Health was re-established in 1988, with a merger of the Department of Community and Occupational Health and the Department of Hospitals and Medical Care. By 1988, the department no longer provided direct services; its role was to regulate, support, and supervise the "provision of services and programs through community-based organizations and board-governed institutions."

During the tenure of Progressive Conservative Premier Ralph Klein, who served from 1992 to 2006 Alberta's healthcare system was redesigned. With a focus on eliminating Alberta's deficit, deep cuts were made in provincial health representing health spending per capita declining from C$1,393 in 1992 to $1,156 in 1995. Under the 1994 Regional Health Authorities Act, 17 regional health authorities were created, replacing hundreds of local hospital boards, long-term care and public health services. At the same time, Klein established provincial health authorities for cancer, mental health and addiction services. Per capita spending on health was cut from CA $1,393 in 1992 to $1,156 in 1995. By 1994, the health department's responsibilities "were limited to overall healthcare policy, providing direction to the healthcare system and regional health authorities, and setting standards for service providers." The department was dissolved in 1999 and replaced by the Ministry of Health and Wellness. Health services in Alberta had undergone several governance reorganization under Premier Klein, which had resulted in fewer separate public organizational entities, in 1996, 2003, and 2006. The Ministry of Health and Wellness, which was established in 1999, replaced the Department of Health. Under Progressive Conservative Premier Ed Stelmach, who served from December 2006 to October 2011, major reforms to Alberta's health-care system were introduced.

On May 15, 2008, then-Health Minister Ron Liepert, announced the creation of "Canada's first province-wide, fully integrated health system"—the Alberta Health Services (AHS)—as a quasi-independent agency of the Alberta government with a mandate to public health services throughout the province. The AHS brought "together 12 formerly separate health entities in the province including three geographically based health authorities, Alberta Alcohol and Drug Abuse Commission (AADAC), Alberta Mental Health Board and Alberta Cancer Board. On April 1, 2009, through the Health Governance Transition Amendment Act, the Alberta Alcohol and Drug Abuse Commission (AADAC), Alberta Mental Health Board and Alberta Cancer Board, were dissolved. As well, the Act consolidated the $13-billion-a-year system with its nine regional health authority boards— Aspen Health Region, Calgary Health Region, Capital Health Region, Chinook Health Region, David Thompson Health Region, East Central Health Region, Northern Lights Health Region, Palliser Health Region, and Peace Country Health Region into one provincial governance board, a public corporation.

=== Since 2019 ===
The August 2019 UCP mandated Blue Ribbon Panel on Alberta's Finances led by Janice MacKinnon—former Saskatchewan health minister—said rising health costs need to be addressed. The panel reported that Alberta was getting comparatively "substandard outcomes for the money it pays." Alberta spent $20.6 billion on health in 2019, which represents over 40% of the operating budget.

=== Alberta Medical Association Master Agreement ===
Bill 21, which was passed in the fall of 2019 during the premiership of Jason Kenney, gave the Alberta government the right to unilaterally end the long-standing master agreement with the Alberta Medical Association (AMA) which ends on March 31, 2020. When Health Minister, Tyler Shandro, terminated the agreement on March 30 and introduced a new fee structure, the AMA responded by filing a lawsuit on April 9 citing the unilateral termination of the master agreement with the Alberta government, the "government's conduct during negotiations", and Bill 21 as "some of the reasons for filing the claim".

=== AHS review and recommendations ===
A December 31, 2019 performance review of Alberta Health Services by Ernst & Young—commissioned by the UCP government—made numerous recommendations to cut costs and increase efficiencies, and set an "aggressive" timeline of three years for implementation of a "massive overhaul" of Alberta's health-care system. On February 3, 2020 Minister Shandro announced the reports findings. The 57 recommendations in the report are aimed at saving about $1.5 billion to $1.9 billion annually. These included "performing more surgeries in private clinics and outsourcing services such as housekeeping and food."

=== Decentralization ===
On May 16, 2025, Premier Danielle Smith announced that the Ministry of Health would be split into the Ministry of Primary and Preventative Health Services, Ministry of Hospital and Surgical Health Services, Ministry of Mental Health and Addiction, and Ministry of Assisted Living and Social Services.

== Ministry structure ==
Alberta's Ministry of Health includes "Health Services and Legislation", "Health Assessment and Grants", and Public Health. The ministry also has oversight of the Alberta Health Government Board, and other boards.

=== Chief officers and ministers ===
The chief officers of the Department of Public Health from 1919 to 1967, include Alexander Grant MacKay (1919–1920), Charles Richmond Mitchell (1920–1921), Richard Gavin Reid (1921–1923), George Hoadley (1923–1935), Wallace Warren Cross (1935–1957), Joseph Donovan Ross (1957–1967).

Ministers of Health from 1967 to 1971, include Joseph Donovan Ross (1967–1969), James Douglas Henderson (1969–1971). Ministers of Health from 1988 to 1999 include Nancy J. Betkowski (1988–1992), Shirley McClellan (1992–1996), and Halvar Jonson (1996–1999).

The Ministers of Health and Wellness from 1999 to 2012 include Halvar Jonson (1999–2000), Gary Mar (June 2, 2000 – November 25, 2004) and Iris Evans (November 25, 2004 – December 15, 2006) under Premier Klein, Ron Liepert (March 12, 2008 – January 15, 2010) and Gene Zwozdesky (January 15, 2010 – October 12, 2011), and Dave Hancock (December 15, 2006 – March 12, 2008) under Stelmach, Fred Horne (October 12, 2011 – May 8, 2012) under Premier Redford. Stephen Mandel was Minister of Health and Seniors from September 15, 2014 to May 24, 2015 under PC Premier Prentice.

Ministers of Health from 2016 to present are Sarah Hoffman (February 2, 2016 – April 30, 2019) in the cabinet of NDP Notley, and Tyler Shandro (2019- September 20, 2021), Jason Copping (September 21, 2021 - date) in the cabinets of Premier Jason Kenney and Danielle Smith.

=== Main agencies: Alberta Health Services and Covenant Health ===
The Edmonton, Alberta-headquartered Alberta Health Services (AHS) was established on May 15, 2008 as a quasi-independent agency of the Alberta government with a mandate to deliver public health services throughout Alberta. AHS, which is the "first province-wide, fully integrated health system", delivers medical care on behalf of the Government of Alberta's Ministry of Health. According to the December 31, 2019 Ernst & Young AHS performance review, AHS serves 4.3 Million Albertans and has a staff of 125,000 staff and 10,000 physicians.
