= Association of Professional Engineers and Geoscientists of Alberta =

Canadian engineering society

- Abbreviation: APEGA
- Founded: April 10, 1920; 106 years ago
- Founder: Government of Alberta
- Purpose: Regulation within Alberta of professional engineers and geoscientists
- Location: Alberta, Canada
- Region served: Alberta
- Key people: Dean Mullin, P.Eng., Ph.D. (President); Ken Hawrelko, P.Eng. (President-Elect); Natasha Avila, P.Eng. (Vice President); Terri Steeves, P.Eng., ICD.D. (Past-President); Paul Wynnyk, CMM, MSM, CD, P.Eng., ICD.D. (Registrar & CEO)
- Website: apega.ca

The Association of Professional Engineers and Geoscientists of Alberta (APEGA) is an engineering society that regulates the practices of professional engineering and geoscience in Alberta.

APEGA receives its mandate from the Engineering and Geoscience Professions Act (EGP Act), which includes registering, setting practice standards, and determining disciplinary actions, when necessary, for its members.

APEGA is also associated with Engineers Canada, Geoscientists Canada, and other technical societies.

== Governance ==
APEGA's mission, vision, and guiding principles are set by an elected Council and Executive Committee and are carried out by staff members, all of whom abide by the EGP Act.

The EGP Act is a Government of Alberta statute that empowers APEGA to regulate the professions of engineering and geoscience in Alberta. Only individuals and companies licensed by APEGA can practice those professions or use the professional designations related to those professions.

=== Executive Committee and Council ===
APEGA conducts an annual election for its council, which consists of the Executive Committee and Councillors. The Executive Committee is made up of the President, Past-President, President-Elect, and Vice-President. Members on the Executive Committee hold a one-year term, and Councillors hold a three-year term.

The Executive Committee and Councillors are elected by professional members of APEGA. Up to 3 Counsellors are appointed by the Government of Alberta. Individuals interested in running for Council must be in good standing and have the professional designation of Professional Engineer, Professional Geoscientist, or Professional Licensee.

== Certification ==
The designations P.Eng., P.Geo., P.Geol., P.Geoph., Licensee, P.L.(Eng.), P.L.(Geo.), or a Permit to Practice for an Alberta corporation practicing engineering or geoscience, ensure that legal, academic, and experience requirements to practice have been met. They also signify adherence to the standards and ethics of the engineering and geoscience professions. In Alberta, only individuals and corporations licensed by APEGA can practice or use titles relating to those professions.

- Professional Engineer (P.Eng.) This licence allows qualified engineers to independently practice engineering in Alberta and to take professional responsibility for their work and the work of others.
- Professional Geoscientist (P.Geo.) This licence allows qualified geoscientists to independently practice geoscience in Alberta and to take professional responsibility for their work and the work of others. The P.Geol. (Geologist) and P.Geoph. (Geophysicist) designations have been grandfathered under the P.Geo. designation.
- Licensee A Licensee has all of the practice rights and obligations of a professional member, except for the right to participate in APEGA elections. This designation is for those who are not Canadian citizens or permanent residents of Canada.
- Professional Licensee (P.L.(Eng.) or P.L.(Geo.)) This licence allows qualified technologists to independently practice engineering or geoscience in Alberta within approved, defined scopes of practice and to take professional responsibility for their work.
- Permit to Practice (Corporate) This licence allows qualified Alberta corporations to provide engineering and/or geoscience services to the public.

Members of APEGA are required to maintain their licences through continuing professional development (CPD) and comply with a professional code of ethics. On behalf of the Government of Alberta, APEGA provides member oversight with investigation and discipline for unskilled or unethical practice of the professions.
