= Jonathan Denis =

Canadian politician

The Honourable Jonathan Denis ECA KC

Member of the Legislative Assembly of Alberta for Calgary-Acadia Calgary-Egmont (2008-2012)
- In office March 3, 2008 – May 5, 2015
- Preceded by: Denis Herard
- Succeeded by: Brandy Payne

Personal details
- Born: September 22, 1975 (age 51) Regina, Saskatchewan
- Party: Progressive Conservative
- Spouse: Breanna Palmer (m. 2014 – d. 2015)
- Education: University of Regina, University of Saskatchewan, University of Toronto, Rotman School of Management, James E. Rogers College of Law, University of Arizona
- Occupation: Lawyer, businessperson

Jonathan Brian Denis, ECA KC (born September 22, 1975) is a Canadian politician and lawyer. On May 9, 2012, he was named Solicitor General, Attorney General, and Minister of Justice for the province of Alberta. He represented the constituency of Calgary-Acadia (formerly Calgary-Egmont) as a Progressive Conservative in the Legislative Assembly of Alberta from 2008 until 2015.

Denis was first elected in the 2008 provincial election and was appointed to cabinet in January 2010, making him the second youngest person to be named to cabinet in Alberta history. He was re-elected to the newly named constituency of Calgary-Acadia on April 23, 2012.

== Early life and education ==
Denis is the son of a Canadian Armed Forces veteran. He graduated in 1993 from Luther College, a private school in Regina, SK. He received a commerce degree from the University of Regina in 1997 and a law degree from the University of Saskatchewan in Saskatoon in 2000. While in law school, Denis was invited as a speaker at an international law conference in Montreal, Quebec. In 2018, Denis completed his ICD.D designation with the Institute of Corporate Directors, a program from Rotman School of Business at the University of Toronto.

Completed Master of Laws (LL.M) degree from the University of Arizona.

=== Career pre-politics (2000-2008) ===
In 1996, staffer for Lynda Haverstock, Independent MLA in the Saskatchewan Legislative Assembly. Haverstock had previously been leader of the Saskatchewan Liberal Party.

Prior to becoming an MLA, Denis was a senior associate, specializing in government relations, at Miller Thomson LLP, He was also the co-founder and President of 3D Contact Inc., the other founder being Nepean-Carleton MP Pierre Poilievre He was also the founder of a real estate investment firm, Liberty West Properties Inc.

== Member of the Legislative Assembly of Alberta ==
=== Backbench MLA (2008-2010) ===
Denis sought public office for the Alberta Progressive Conservatives in the 2008 provincial election in the constituency of Calgary-Egmont and received 43.6% of the vote.

Denis served as a member of the Standing Committee on the Alberta Heritage Savings Trust Fund, the Public Accounts Committee, the Standing Committee on Health, and the Cabinet Policy Committee on Health. In 2008, Deputy Premier Ron Stevens appointed Denis to the Alberta/Alaska Bilateral Council.

In 2008, Health and Wellness Minister Ron Liepert appointed Denis to conduct a widely based consultation for the Alberta Pharmaceutical Strategy.

In 2008, Sustainable Resources Minister Ted Morton appointed Denis to the Land Use Framework Committee

=== Minister of Housing and Urban Affairs (2010-2011) ===
Denis was sworn in as Minister of Housing and Urban Affairs as well as Deputy Government House Leader on January 15, 2010.

On April 6, 2011, Denis’ department provided $638,000 in provincial housing money to support tenants of the YWCA's Ophelia House in Calgary.

=== Solicitor General & Minister of Public Security (2011-2012), 2012 Election ===
On October 12, 2011, Denis was sworn in as Solicitor General and Minister of Public Security.

On April 23, 2012, Denis was re-elected in renamed riding of Calgary-Acadia.

=== Minister of Justice, Attorney General, & Solicitor General (2012-2015), 2015 Election ===
On May 9, 2012, Denis was appointed Minister of Justice, Solicitor General, Attorney General, and Provincial Secretary Alberta.

Denis pursued a "law and order" policy. and a provincial grant for 300 new police officers in the cities.

On September 1, 2012, Denis enacted stricter drunk driving penalties. Following this drunk driving law, drunk driving charges went down two years in a row, including 17% in 2015.

On April 17, 2014, Denis supported removing the preamble to the Marriage Act which made the Act gender-neutral.

On June 13, 2014, Denis’ department provided a grant from the Civil Forfeiture Fund to the Edmonton Pride Centre, to support programs for LGBTQ youth.

On July 21, 2014, Denis doubled the limit in Alberta small claims court to $50,000. This move was lauded by many Alberta lawyers as a positive step for access to justice.

On September 15, 2014, Denis was re-appointed to his previous positions by Premier Jim Prentice. Prentice subsequently appointed Denis Government House Leader.

On April 25, 2015, Denis resigned during the 2015 election campaign, due to "legal proceedings" involving estranged wife, Breanna Palmer.

On May 4, 2015, Court of Queen's Bench Justice Craig Jones cleared Denis's name and "revoked" the order that his wife had obtained against him, stating that Palmer's "recollection of the events was inaccurate".

Denis continued as a candidate but was defeated in the May 5, 2015 general election, finishing third.

== Accolades ==
In 2009, Denis was appointed Queen's Counsel of Alberta.

Im 2010, Denis was named to Avenue Magazine's "Top 40 under Under 40” list.

In 2011, the Canadian Taxpayers' Federation lauded Denis for expense reduction department by 39%. They also gave Denis "nice” recommendations for prudent expense management on two occasions.

== Post-politics ==
Founded Guardian Law Group

In June 2021, Denis represented Edmonton city councillor and mayoral candidate Mike Nickel.

In April 2022, Denis was found in contempt of court by Court of Queen's Bench Justice Doreen Sulyma for sending a letter to Dr. Anny Sauvageau while she was testifying in her lawsuit against the Alberta government in an attempt to intimidate her. Justice Sulyma, who presided over the trial, noted that this letter was "unprecedented" in her experience and the timing of the letter as "disastrous". Sulyma found Denis in contempt of court, finding he did intend to intimidate Sauvageau and to "obstruct her testimony and the trial process itself". On October 31, 2022, the Alberta Court of Appeal overturned the contempt citation on procedural grounds.

== Controversy ==
In April 2022, Denis allegedly hired a political fixer to obtain a reporter's phone logs. The fixer claimed he was hired by Jonathan Denis to get the phone records of the former Calgary Herald reporter now of The Canadian Press. The fixer claimed Denis told him he wanted to trace sources the reporter had drawn on for a story about whether the size of Denis's wedding to his second wife, broke COVID-19 protocols.

In April 2022, Denis was accused of conflict of interest with ex-law partner, allegedly making one client “the scapegoat” for another.

In June 2024, Denis won what may be the biggest case of libel in Canadian history, $6.6M in damages.

=== Disputed videos ===
In September 2022, videos were anonymously released on social media that purported to show Denis, on the phone, doing a caricature of an Indigenous person. There was dispute about whether the videos were authentic or deepfakes. Denis said that he had no recollection of any such call. He added that he had "overused alcohol in the past". Addressing the possibility that he had made such a call "years ago while under the influence of alcohol", he said that, if he had, he apologized.

Denis hired "Reality Defender, which analyzed the video and concluded that it was likely manipulated. The Canadian Broadcasting Corporation (CBC) hired the Media Verification (MeVer) team, and stated: "Their analysis suggested that the possibility of the videos being deepfakes was very low."

The CBC also reported that professor Hany Farid opined that it was "extremely unlikely that these are deepfakes".

In June 2024, CBC updated their original reporting as follows:

"In September 2023, the Alberta Court of King's Bench signed an order in which it states the videos in this story were not authentic. That order was the result of an affidavit filed in an undefended action in which an expert claims the videos may have been manipulated using deepfake techniques. CBC consulted with other experts, who concluded such determinations are extremely hard to make.

=== Professional misconduct ===
In September 2024, the Law Society of Alberta found Denis guilty of two counts of professional misconduct. In one case, he represented a passenger involved in an automobile accident after having first been asked to represent the driver. In the second case, he threatened a woman who had an affair with his client; specifically, he said that he would report the matter to her employer.

In December 2024, the Law Society of Alberta fined Denis $2,500 on each count, for a total of $5,000. Cost reimbursement (if any) was to be determined later. The Law Society was seeking $26,000 in costs.

In March 2025, in addition to the $5,000 in fines, the Law Society of Alberta ordered Denis to pay $15,000 in costs. Denis then announced he was appealing the convictions, fines and costs.

One day after Denis announced the appeal, the Law Society of Alberta again cited Denis, this time for allegations of witness tampering.

== Election results ==
2015 Alberta general election: Calgary-Acadia
Party	Candidate	Votes	%	±%
New Democratic	Brandy Payne	5,506	34.72%	30.20%
Wildrose	Linda Carlson	4,985	31.44%	-10.65%
Progressive Conservative	Jonathan Denis	4,602	29.02%	-16.76%
Liberal	Nicholas Borovsky	765	4.82%	-1.45%
Total		15,858	–	–
Rejected, spoiled and declined		113	–	–
Eligible electors / turnout		29,264	54.58%	-2.06%
New Democratic gain from Progressive Conservative		Swing		-0.21%
Source(s) Source: "03 - Calgary-Acadia, 2015 Alberta general election". officialresults.elections.ab.ca. Elections Alberta.

2012 Alberta general election: Calgary-Acadia
Party	Candidate	Votes	%	±%
Progressive Conservative	Jonathan Denis	6,863	45.78%	–
Wildrose	Richard Jones	6,308	42.08%	–
Liberal	Nicole Hankel	940	6.27%	–
New Democratic	Nick Lepora	677	4.52%	–
Evergreen	Antoni (Tony) Grochowski	202	1.35%	–
Total		14,990	–	–
Rejected, spoiled and declined		117	–	–
Eligible electors / turnout		26,675	56.63%	–
Progressive Conservative pickup new district.				
Source(s) Source: "03 - Calgary-Acadia, 2012 Alberta general election". officialresults.elections.ab.ca. Elections Alberta.

2008 Alberta general election: Calgary-Egmont
Party	Candidate	Votes	%	±%
Progressive Conservative	Jonathan Denis	5,415	43.61%	-7.21%
Liberal	Cathie Williams	3,289	26.49%	5.30%
Independent	Craig Chandler	2,008	16.17%	–
Wildrose	Barry Chase	676	5.44%	-9.38%
Green	Mark MacGillivray	582	4.69%	-3.13%
New Democratic	Jason Nishiyama	447	3.60%	-1.75%
Total		12,417	–	–
Rejected, spoiled and declined		69	–	–
Eligible electors / turnout		30,070	41.52%	0.30%
Progressive Conservative hold		Swing		-6.25%
Source(s) Source: The Report on the March 3, 2008 Provincial General Election of the Twenty-seventh Legislative Assembly (PDF). Elections Alberta. July 28, 2008. pp. 198–201.
