= Vesuvius red zone =

Area requiring evacuation if Vesuvius erupts

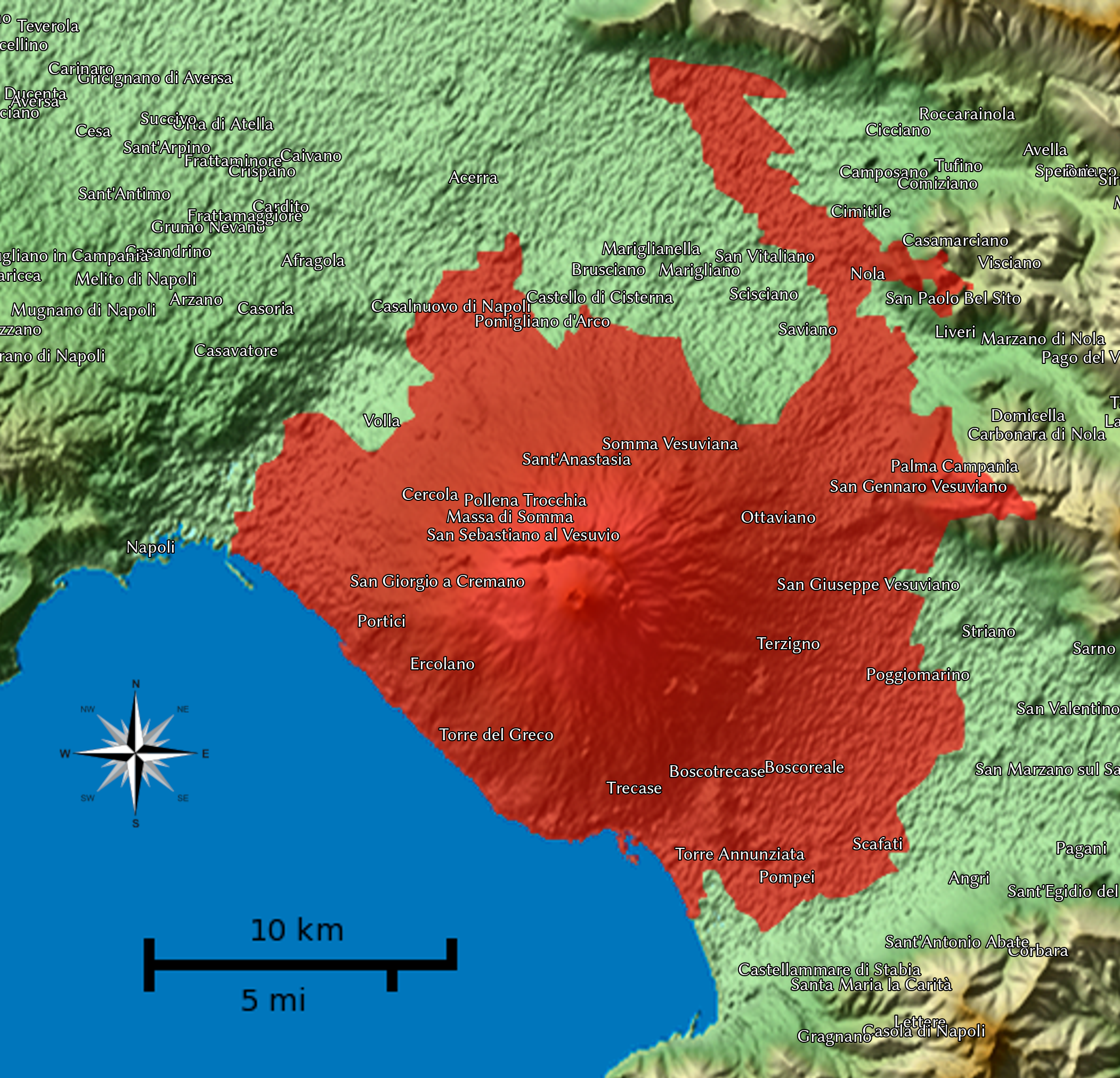
Map of Vesuvius red zone as defined in 2013

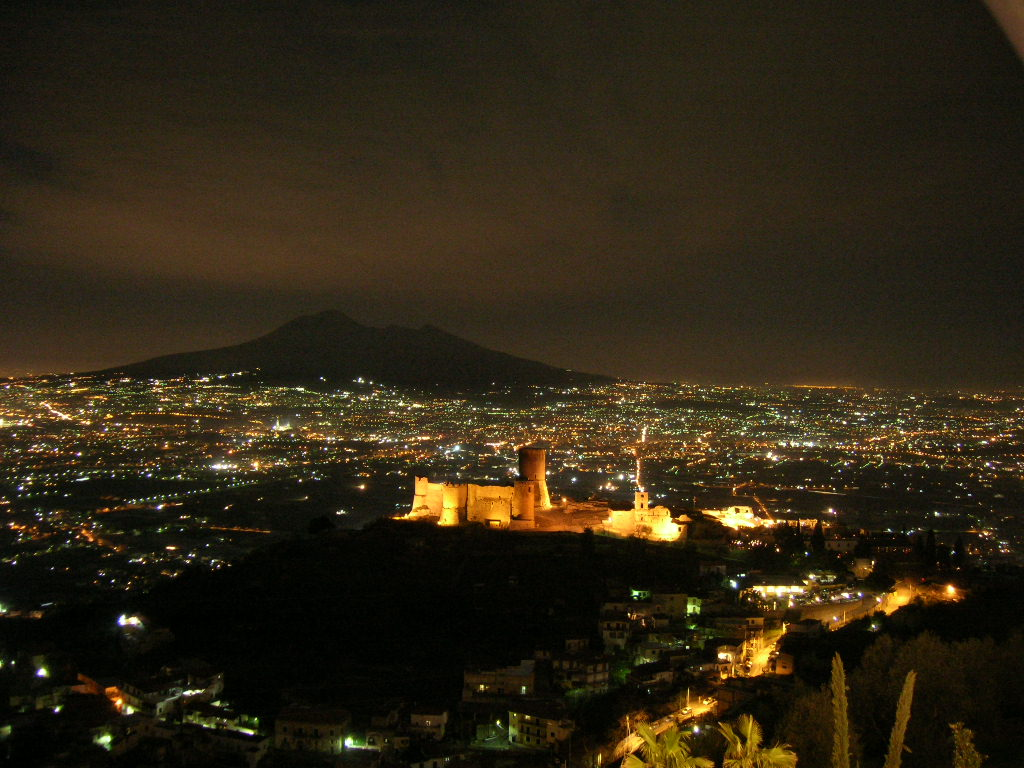
Mount Vesuvius lies in a highly populated area.

The Vesuvius red zone (Italian: zona rossa del Vesuvio) is the area designated to be quickly evacuated within a few days in the case of an eruption of Mount Vesuvius. The authorities believe that they will have two weeks' warning of an imminent eruption; the questions that arise are whether the population can be evacuated in time, despite a reluctance to leave their homes; and if there be as much as two weeks' warning in reality.

As the area around Mount Vesuvius is highly urbanized, it became necessary to develop evacuation plans to be applied when the signs of a forthcoming eruption appear. A danger zone around the volcano was first identified in 2001 by the Italian Protezione Civile; its boundaries were then redefined in 2013 following new studies on the behaviour of Plinian eruptions.

The zone is composed by two subzones, called red zone 1 and 2. The former is the most dangerous area in the case of an eruption, being at greatest risk from pyroclastic flows. The red zone 2 will be subjected to falling ash and lapilli, whose intensity will depend on the intensity and direction of the winds at the time.

Mount Vesuvius is continuously kept under surveillance by the Vesuvius Observatory of the National Institute of Geophysics and Volcanology. When an appointed set of geologic activities occurs, an eruption warning is issued and the evacuation procedure begins. It has been estimated that 72 hours are needed to complete the evacuation: 12 hours to organize it, 48 hours to transfer all the people outside the red zone and 12 hours are kept as a safety margin for unexpected events.

== List of comunes involved ==
The red zone comprises 25 comunes and part of the city of Naples, with about 800,000 residents to be evacuated.

In the case of an eruption, the evacuated people will be transferred to and hosted in 19 Italian regions (Campania being excluded), according to their comune of origin.

List of comunes to be evacuated
Comune	Population	Surface (km^{2})	Hosting region
Boscoreale	25933	11.28	Campania
Boscotrecase	9860	7	Campania
Cercola	16877	3	Campania
Ercolano	49790	19.64	Campania
Massa di Somma	4985	3.03	Campania
Napoli (6th municipality only)	112425	19.28	Campania
Nola	33843	39	Campania
Ottaviano	23325	19.85	Campania
Palma Campania	16254	20.8	Campania
Poggiomarino	22408	13.28	Campania
Pollena Trocchia	12723	8.11	Campania
Pompei	23800	12.4	Campania
Portici	51901	4.52	Campania
San Gennaro Vesuviano	12111	6.97	Campania
San Giorgio a Cremano	42096	4.11	Campania
San Giuseppe Vesuviano	30400	14	Campania
San Sebastiano al Vesuvio	8633	2	Campania
Sant'Anastasia	26202	18.76	Campania
Scafati	50686	19.69	Campania
Somma Vesuviana	33557	30.74	Campania
Terzigno	17298	23	Campania
Torre Annunziata	40036	7.33	Campania
Torre del Greco	80069	30.66	Campania
Trecase	8501	6.14	Campania

== See also ==
- Emergency evacuation
- Emergency management
- Vesuvius National Park
- Pompeii and Herculaneum
- Prediction of volcanic activity
- Phlegraean Fields red zone
