= Phlegraean Fields red zone =

Evacuation area in case of an eruption of the Phlegraean Fields

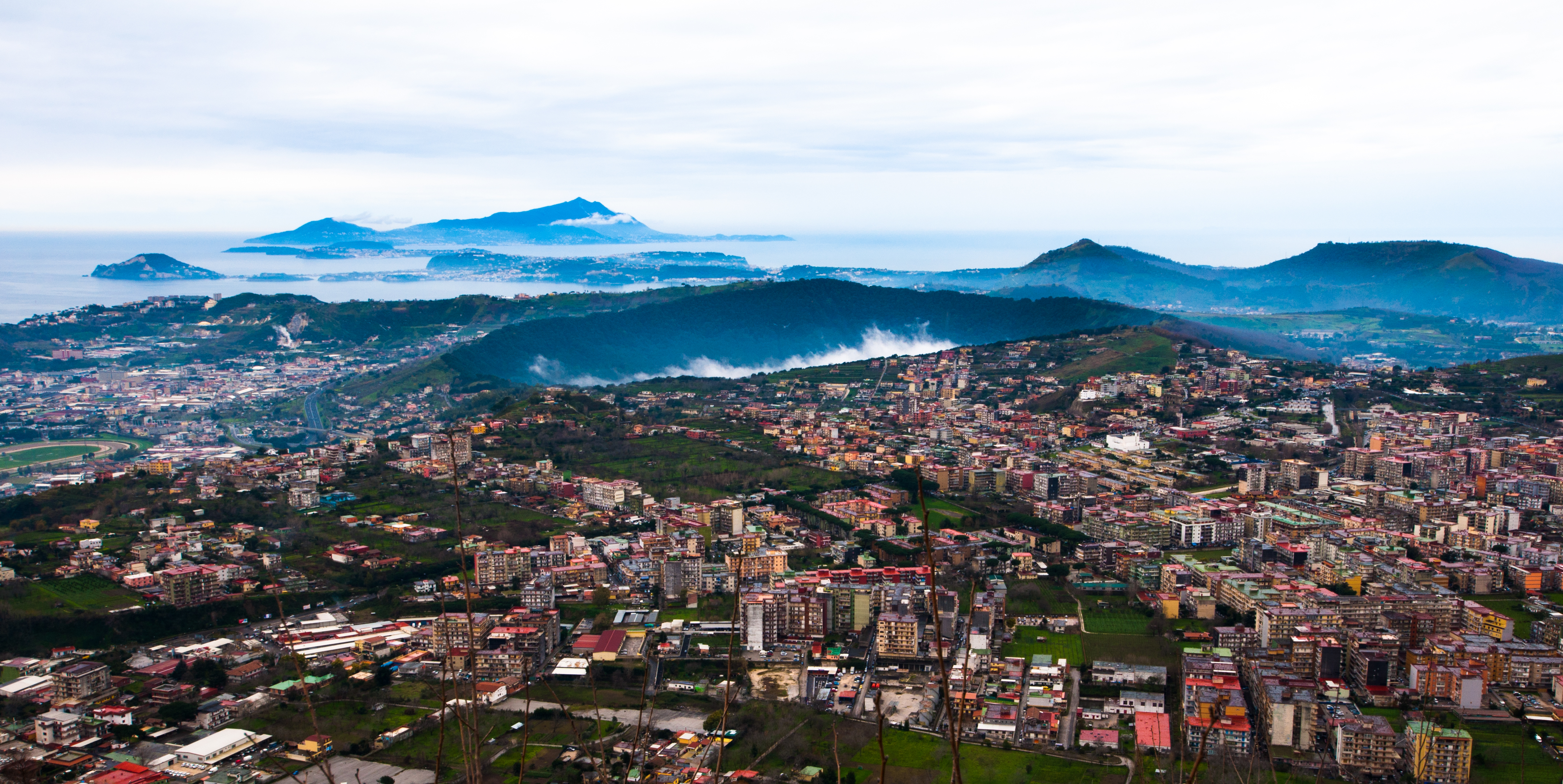
View of the Phlegraean Fields.

The Phlegraean Fields red zone (Italian: zona rossa dei Campi Flegrei) is the area at greatest volcanic risk in the Phlegraean Fields, in Italy.

The Phlegraean Fields is an area of volcanic calderas west of the city of Naples. It has existed for about 300,000 years, and about 39,000 years ago it was the scene of the largest known volcanic eruption ever occurred in Europe. Its last major eruption took place in 1538.

The red zone is the highest risk area in case of an eruption, mainly due to its exposure to pyroclastic flows, and in case of an impending eruption it must be quickly evacuated. It entirely includes the comunes of Pozzuoli, Bacoli, Monte di Procida and Quarto, and part of the comunes of Giugliano in Campania, Marano di Napoli and Naples, with approximately 500,000 people to evacuate.

A lower risk zone also exists, which is called the yellow zone and whose residents may have to be evacuated if the volcanic ash fall is too intense. It includes several other municipalities, with a total population of 800,000 inhabitants.

The area is subjected to bradyseismic phenomena (the rise or fall of the ground), whose intensity is used as an indicator of the level of underground geological activity. The Protezione Civile provides specific alert levels according to the activity of the volcano, together with the National Institute of Geophysics and Volcanology. The evacuation plan is triggered by the declaration of the "alarm" state and it is expected to be completed in 72 hours.

== See also ==
- Emergency evacuation
- Emergency management
- Prediction of volcanic activity
- Vesuvius red zone
