= Tyler Shandro =

Canadian politician (born c. 1976)

The Honourable Tyler Shandro ECA KC
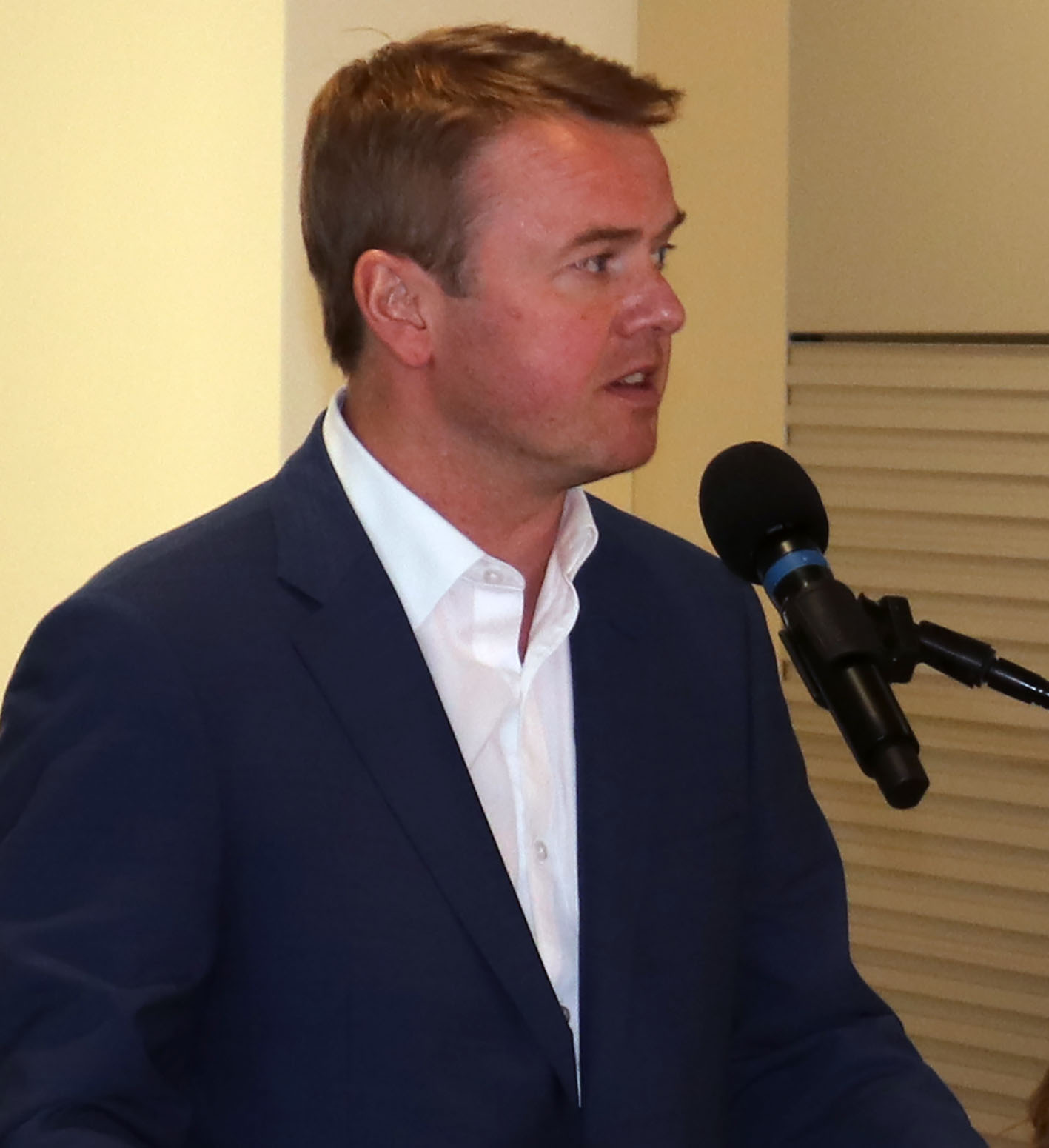

Member of the Legislative Assembly of Alberta for Calgary-Acadia
- In office April 16, 2019 – May 29, 2023
- Preceded by: Brandy Payne
- Succeeded by: Diana Batten

Minister of Justice and Solicitor General of Alberta
- In office February 25, 2022 – June 9, 2023
- Premier: Jason Kenney; Danielle Smith
- Preceded by: Kaycee Madu
- Succeeded by: Mickey Amery

Alberta Minister of Labour and Immigration
- In office September 21, 2021 – February 25, 2022
- Premier: Jason Kenney
- Preceded by: Jason Copping
- Succeeded by: Kaycee Madu

Alberta Minister of Health
- In office April 30, 2019 – September 21, 2021
- Premier: Jason Kenney
- Preceded by: Sarah Hoffman
- Succeeded by: Jason Copping

Personal details
- Born: c. 1976 (age 49–50) Edmonton, Alberta, Canada
- Party: United Conservative Party
- Occupation: Politician, lawyer.

Tyler Shandro ECA KC (born c. 1976) is a Canadian politician who served as the minister of justice and solicitor general of Alberta from February 2022 to June 2023. A member of the United Conservative Party (UCP), Shandro was elected to represent Calgary-Acadia in the Legislative Assembly of Alberta in the 2019 provincial election. He was Alberta's minister of health from 2019 to 2021, and minister of labour and immigration from 2021 until he was named justice minister in 2022. He lost re-election in the 2023 provincial election.

Shandro was vice-chair of the Legislative Review Committee while also on the Alberta First Cabinet Policy Committee.

Shandro sponsored 15 bills ranging from addressing issues from healthcare to justice, with Bill 8 gaining more attention. Shandro said the Alberta Firearms Act (Bill 8) would “give Alberta the tools it needs to deal with what he called escalating attacks by Ottawa on law-abiding Alberta gunowners".

== Early and personal life ==
Shandro was born in Edmonton, Alberta, and later moved to Calgary to attend the University of Calgary and begin his legal career. During his legal career he served as a member of several boards, including the Criminal Injuries Review Board, the National Parole Board, and the Municipal Government Board. Shandro also served on the Calgary Police Commission. Previously he was appointed as a member of the Disaster Advisory Committee after the 2013 Alberta floods.

=== Family ===
Shandro is married to Andrea and they have two children. His great-uncle Andrew Shandro served as a Member of the Legislative Assembly (MLA) for the Whitford electoral district from 1913 to 1922 representing the Liberal Party of Alberta. The hamlet of Shandro, Alberta in Two Hills County is named in honour of Shandro's ancestors.

== Political career (2019–present) ==
=== Early political involvement ===
Shandro was a long time volunteer with the Progressive Conservative (PC) Association of Alberta. Following the party's defeat in the 2015 Alberta general election, Shandro ran unsuccessfully for party president against Katherine O'Neill. During this time Shandro rejected calls to merge the PCs with the Wildrose Party, describing how "I don't think it's legally permissible". However, after joining the Alberta Conservative Consolidation Committee (an organization of conservative lawyers), Shandro supported the amalgamation and wrote one of the legal briefs arguing the amalgamation was legally possible. Shandro served on the committee which set out the terms forming the UCP following the 2017 merger of the PCs and Wildrose Party.

=== Election to Legislature (2019) ===
Shandro contested the 2019 Alberta general election in the district of Calgary-Acadia which was previously held by New Democratic Party (NDP) MLA Brandy Payne, who retired from politics following the closure of the 29th Alberta Legislature. Shandro captured 12,615 votes (54 per cent) defeating five other opponents including the next closest candidate, New Democrat Kate Andrews, with 8,049 votes (35 per cent).

=== Minister of Health (2019–2021) ===
On April 30, 2019, Shandro was appointed as the minister of health.

Shandro announced in 2021 that $400 million in operational funding would be invested towards the new version of the Affordability Supportive Living Initiative. Shandro estimated that 3,800 would be replacement beds and 2,200 would be new beds.

As Minister of Health, Shandro oversaw massive health-care worker layoffs. He has repeatedly denied that there have had been layoffs, but at least 11,000 Alberta Health Services (AHS) workers in laundry, nutrition and food services, lab services, and other support positions have had their jobs cut or privatized since 2020.

==== Vital Partners controversy ====
On March 19, 2020, concerns were raised on social media that there was a potential conflict of interest on the part of Shandro, who has shares in Vital Partners, along with his wife's sister, and his wife, Andrea Shandro. In response to complaints sent to the ethics commissioner's office about Shandro's alleged conflict of interest, the ethics commissioner, Marguerite Trussler, wrote in a March 20, 2020, letter that, since Shandro was not the director of Shandro Holdings, the company that owns Vital Partners, and since his shares in that company are in a blind trust, he has done "all that is required to be in compliance with the Conflict of Interest Act".

After news of this controversy broke, the Shandro family were subjected to multiple personal attacks through social media.

==== Confrontation controversies ====
On March 22, Shandro and his wife went to the residence of their neighbour Dr. Mukarram Zaidi. Zaidi, who had previously served on the constituency association of MLA Mike Ellis alongside Shandro, claimed that Shandro berated him for sharing a Facebook post about Shandro's potential conflict of interest regarding Vital Partners. Shandro allegedly requested that Zaidi remove the post, which he did. Though Zaidi forgave Shandro, Zaidi still feared for both his own and his family's safety, and that he had yet to receive an apology from Shandro.

Shandro stated that he regretted his actions, though added that he had merely "responded passionately" in an attempt to stand up for his wife. Following the incident, Opposition MLAs called on Premier Kenney to fire Shandro.

Shandro responded to the media controversy in a March 27 statement, saying that the social media posts regarding Vital Partners had led to his family being "subjected to an online campaign of defamation". In his March 27 statement he said he regretted his actions, as they were a distraction from the COVID-19 pandemic. Shandro was supported by Premier Kenney, who said that Shandro's behaviour was understandable given that the minister felt his family was under attack.

A March 27 CBC article described another incident in which Shandro allegedly threatened a constituent who had confronted him about the conflict of interest, saying he would contact provincial security services.

On April 3, the CBC published an article detailing how Shandro had allegedly obtained the personal phone numbers of two physicians from Alberta Health Services illegally. He phoned the two individuals on their private phones, which raised concerns about privacy violations.

By the end of March, there was considerable media coverage of Shandro's response to these concerns including articles in the Medicine Hat News, the Edmonton Journal, and CBC News, A CBC article described how Vital Partners could potentially profit from changes to provincial physician reimbursement that led to physicians having to fire staff and shutter practices. The media coverage of the confrontation resulted in the political opposition and citizens calling for Shandro's resignation.

Shandro struggled to recover from these allegations, with an April poll showing 34 per cent of Albertans expressing their approval for his handling of COVID-19—the lowest approval rating in Canada. In a July 2020 survey of Alberta doctors, 98% of respondents said that they had lost confidence in Shandro.

==== AMA agreement ====
Bill 21 gave Shandro the right to unilaterally end the long-standing master agreement with the Alberta Medical Association (AMA). He terminated the agreement on March 30 and introduced a new fee structure which Shandro stressed would provide $5.4 billion in annual funding among other supports. On April 9, the AMA filed a lawsuit against the province, citing the termination of the agreement as well as the "government's conduct during negotiations". On March 30, 2021, Alberta doctors voted 53 percent to turn down a negotiated offer to settle their long standing dispute with the government.

==== End of tenure ====
On September 21, 2021, Premier Jason Kenney shuffled him out of the cabinet position as health minister. NDP leader Rachel Notley stated that the news of his departure was "welcome" however "Alberta is facing a crisis in our hospitals but the UCP can't see beyond the chaotic spectacle of their own infighting."

=== Minister of Labour and Immigration (2021–2022) ===
On September 21, 2021, Shandro was appointed as the Minister of Labour and Immigration, swapping roles with Jason Copping, who took over the health portfolio.

=== Minister of Justice and Solicitor General of Alberta (2022–2023) ===
Shandro took over the role of Minister of Justice and Solicitor General of Alberta on February 25, 2022, swapping portfolios with Kaycee Madu, who was demoted after a probe found he attempted to interfere with the administration of justice.

As Justice Minister, Shandro has been critical of the federal Liberal government plan to ban handguns and further restrict semi-automatic rifles. He sponsored the Alberta Firearms Act which is said to counter what the Alberta government sees as federal overreach. The Alberta Firearms Act received royal assent on March 28, 2023. "We disagree with the confiscation program, so we don't think that there should be anyone involved in being engaged as a seizure agent for the confiscation program," Shandro stated. Much of the act expands the responsibilities and powers given to the provincial Chief Firearms Officer, as well as regulation powers that the government can use in orders in-council concerning future "firearms matters".

On April 5 of the same year, the act was referenced in a news release from Shandro's Justice Ministry as legislation (along with the Municipal Governments Firearms Amendments Act) that the province may use to regulate the federal firearms buy-back program. Specifically, this usage of the act is claimed to give to the Alberta government the final word before municipal and / or police services enter into funding agreements or accept funding from the federal government to take part in the federal program.

Shandro lost his seat in the 2023 Alberta general election to Diana Batten from the NDP.

== Law Society of Alberta Proceedings ==
In 2020, the Law Society of Alberta authorized three citations against Shandro:

CO20200379: It is alleged that Tyler Shandro, KC attended the private residence of a member of the public, behaved inappropriately by engaging in conduct that brings the reputation of the profession into disrepute, and that such conduct is deserving of sanction;

CO20200393: It is alleged that Tyler Shandro, KC used his position as Minister of Health to obtain personal cell phone numbers, contacted one or more members of the public outside of regular working hours using that information, and that such conduct is deserving of sanction; and

CO20200759: It is alleged that Tyler Shandro, KC responded to an email from a member of the public addressed to his wife by threatening to refer that individual to the authorities if they did not address future correspondence to his office as Minister of Health, and that such conduct is deserving of sanction

Virtual conduct hearings into these matters began on Tuesday January 24, 2023. The hearing was adjourned to a later date as the 3 days allotted for the hearing were insufficient.

During the hearings, Shandro's lawyer criticized the proceedings as politically-motivated and not related to the practice of law. Shandro testified that he had reached out to the vice president of community of engagement and communications at Alberta Health Services after the two doctors in question had confronted him in person earlier about a recent rate cut. Shandro said that he indicated he wanted to identify the doctors because he was willing to speak with them and was passed on their names and contact information by AHS, who did not confirm with Shandro that the doctors were actually prepared to speak with him or that the numbers given to him were private numbers.

In July 2024, a majority of a three-person Law Society panel released its decision not to sanction Shandro on any of the citations. It ruled that in respect to the first two citations that lawyers were allowed to have emotional conversations with their neighbours and that the phone conversations with doctors did not violate their privacy rights and were professional. In respect to the third citation, the panel found that while Shandro's reply was improper, it was not a clear threat and did not rise to the level of professional misconduct. A partially dissenting panel member would have found Shandro guilty of misconduct for the conversation with his neighbour.

== Electoral history ==
2023 Alberta general election: Calgary-Acadia
| Party | Candidate | Votes | % | ±% |
|---|---|---|---|---|
| New Democratic | Diana Batten | 10,958 | 48.58 | +13.93 |
| United Conservative | Tyler Shandro | 10,933 | 48.47 | -5.84 |
| Green | Paul Bechthold | 293 | 1.29 | +0.25 |
| Independent | Larry R. Heather | 163 | 0.72 | – |
| Wildrose Loyalty Coalition | Donna Kathleen Scott | 119 | 0.53 | – |
| Solidarity Movement | Linda McClelland | 92 | 0.41 | – |
| Total | | 22,558 | 99.24 | – |
| Rejected and declined | | 173 | 0.76 | |
| Turnout | | 22,731 | 64.29 | |
| Eligible electors | | 35,355 | | |
| New Democratic gain from United Conservative | | Swing | | +9.88 |
Source(s) Source: Elections Alberta

2019 Alberta general election: Calgary-Acadia
| Party | Candidate | Votes | % | ±% | Expenditures |
|---|---|---|---|---|---|
| United Conservative | Tyler Shandro | 12,615 | 54.30 | -3.45 | $117,646 |
| New Democratic | Kate Andrews | 8,049 | 34.65 | -1.04 | $37,925 |
| Alberta Party | Lana Bentley | 1,728 | 7.44 | +5.69 | $8,020 |
| Liberal | Lorissa Good | 350 | 1.51 | -3.19 | $500 |
| Alberta Independence | Patrick Reilly | 245 | 1.05 | – | $8,243 |
| Green | Amanda Bishop | 243 | 1.05 | – | $500 |
| Total | | 23,230 | 99.23 | – | |
| Rejected, spoiled and declined | | 180 | 0.77 | | |
| Turnout | | 23,410 | 67.60 | | |
| Eligible voters | | 34,632 | | | |
| United Conservative notional hold | | Swing | | -1.21 | |
Source(s) Source: Elections Alberta Note: Expenses is the sum of "Election Expenses", "Other Expenses" and "Transfers Issued". The Elections Act limits "Election Expenses" to $50,000.

Alberta provincial government of Jason Kenney
Cabinet posts (2)
| Predecessor | Office | Successor |
| Jason Copping | Minister of Labour & Immigration; September 21, 2021 – | Incumbent |
| Sarah Hoffman | Minister of Health; April 30, 2019 – September 21, 2021 | Jason Copping |
