= Alberta Pensions Services Corporation =

Company

- Company type: Crown corporation
- Industry: Fund administration
- Founded: 1995
- Headquarters: Edmonton, Alberta, Canada
- Owner: Government of Alberta
- Number of employees: 201 - 500
- Website: www.apsc.ca

The Alberta Pensions Services Corporation (APS) is a Crown corporation responsible for providing pension benefit administration services for public-sector employees in Alberta, Canada.

Headquartered in Edmonton, APS administers seven statutory public sector pension and two supplementary retirement plans plans on behalf of the Government of Alberta.
