= Financial Review Rich List 2020 =

Annual list of wealthiest Australians

The Financial Review Rich List 2020 is the 37th annual survey of the 200 wealthiest people resident in Australia, published by the Australian Financial Review in The Australian Financial Review Magazine on 30 October 2020.

The net worth of the wealthiest individual, Gina Rinehart, was A$28.89 billion; while the net worth of the 200th wealthiest individual, Nigel Satterley, was A$540 million; up from A$472 million for the 200th individual in 2019. The combined wealth of the 200 individuals was calculated as A$424 bn, an increase of A$72 bn on the previous year; compared with a combined wealth of A$6.4 bn in 1984 when the BRW Rich 200 commenced. The list included nineteen debutants, including three of Rinehart's children.

Rinehart held the mantle of Australia's wealthiest individual between 2011 and 2015; peaking in 2012, when her net worth was assessed at A$29.17 bn. From 2017 to 2019, Anthony Pratt was Australia's wealthiest individual, ranked third in the 2020 Rich List, after Andrew Forrest AO, Australia's wealthiest individual in 2008. Harry Triguboff AO was Australia's wealthiest individual in 2016, ranked seventh in the 2020 Rich List.

== List of individuals ==
2020		Name	Citizenship	Source of wealth	2019	
Rank	Net worth A$ bn	Name	Citizenship	Source of wealth	Rank	Net worth A$ bn
1 ▲	28.89 ▲	Gina Rinehart	Australia	Hancock Prospecting; investment	2	13.81 ▲
2 ▲	23.00 ▲	Andrew Forrest AO	Australia	Fortescue	8	7.99 ▲
3 ▼	19.75 ▲	Anthony Pratt	Australia	Visy; Pratt Industries	1	15.57 ▲
4	18.06 ▲	Hui Wing Mau	China; Australia	Shimao Property	4	10.39 ▲
5 ▲	16.93 ▲	Mike Cannon-Brookes	Australia	Atlassian	11 ▲	9.75 ▲
6 ▼	16.69 ▲	Scott Farquhar	Australia	Atlassian	12 ▲	9.63 ▲
7 ▼	14.42 ▲	Harry Triguboff AO	Australia	Meriton	3 ▼	13.54 ▲
8 ▲	9.18 ▲	Clive Palmer	Australia	Mineralogy and other mining interests; hospitality	15 ▲	4.09 ▲
9 ▼	8.30 ▼	Sir Frank Lowy AC	Australia	ex-Westfield; property (shopping centres)	7 ▼	8.57 ▲
10 ▲	6.26 ▲	Kerry Stokes AC	Australia	Property; Seven West Media; resources	11 ▲	5.69 ▲
11 ▼	5.45 ▼	John Gandel AC	Australia	Property (shopping centres)	10 ▼	6.60 ▲
12 ▲	4.93 ▲	Alan Wilson and family	Australia	Reece Group	16	4.07 ▲
13	4.69 ▼	James Packer	Australia	Crown Resorts; Consolidated Media Holdings	13 ▼	4.94 ▼
14 ▼	4.63 ▼	Vivek Chaand Sehgal	Australia	Motherson Sumi Systems	12 ▼	5.50 ▼
15 ▲	4.60 ▲	Chau Chak Wing	Australia	Property; investments	58 ▼	1.55 ▼
16 ▼	4.54 ▼	Ivan Glasenberg	Australia; South Africa; Switzerland	Glencore commodities trading	9 ▼	7.17 ▼
17 ▲	4.51 ▲	Jack Cowin	Australia	Competitive Foods Australia; investment	25 ▼	2.79 ▲
18 ▼	4.42 ▲	Len Ainsworth AM and family	Australia	Gaming; manufacturing	17 ▼	4.01 ▼
19 ▼	4.27 ▼	Lang Walker	Australia	Walker Corporation (property)	14 ▲	4.67 ▲
20	4.10 ▲	Richard White	Australia	Technology	20 ▲	3.31 ▲
21 ▲	3.83 ▲	Angela Bennett	Australia	Mining	28 ▲	2.62 ▲
22 ▼	3.76 ▲	Lachlan Murdoch	United States; United Kingdom; Australia	Media	18 ▲	3.62 ▲
23 ▼	3.72 ▲	Lindsay Fox AC	Australia	Linfox; property	21 ▼	3.31 ▼
24	3.72 ▲	Solomon Lew	Australia	Premier Investments; retail	24 ▼	2.83 ▲
25 ▲	3.62 ▲	Alexandra Burt and Leonie Baldock	Australia	Resources	31 ▼	2.38 ▲
26 ▲	3.43 ▲	Melanie Perkins and Cliff Obrecht	Australia	Canva	n/a	not listed
27 ▲	3.19 ▲	Terry Snow AM	Australia	Capital Airport Group; property	43 ▲	1.86 ▲
28 ▼	2.93 ▲	David Hains	Australia	Investment	23 ▼	2.90 ▲
29 ▲	2.73 ▲	Betty Klimenko, Monica Weinberg-Saunders and family	Australia	Property	32 ▲	2.37 ▲
30 ▼	2.60 ▼	Sir Michael Hintze GCSG, AM	Australia; United Kingdom	Retail; investment	26 ▼	2.72 ▲
31 ▲	2.57 ▲	Gerry Harvey	Australia	Harvey Norman Holdings	40 ▼	1.90 ▼
32 ▲	2.54 ▲	David and Vicky Teoh	Australia	Telecommunications	38	2.03 ▲
33	2.33 ▼	Michael Hodgson	Australia	Property	33 ▲	2.34 ▲
34 ▲	2.31 ▼	Maurice Alter and family	Australia	Retail	35 ▼	2.33 ▲
35 ▼	2.24 ▼	Marcus Besen and family	Australia	Retail	34 ▼	2.34 ▼
36 ▼	2.24 ▼	Prudence MacLeod	Australia	News Corporation and Times Newspapers	22 ▲	3.10 ▲
37 ▼	2.20 ▲	Brett Blundy	Australia	Retail; property; agriculture	39 ▲	2.00 ▲
38 ▲	2.13 ▲	Peter, Andrew and Lex Greensill	Australia; United Kingdom	Financial services; agriculture	75 ▲	1.21 ▲
39 ▼	2.05 ▼	Bianca Rinehart	Australia	Hancock Prospecting	19	3.61 ▲
40 ▲	2.05 ▲	John Hancock	Australia	Hancock Prospecting	n/a	not listed
41 ▲	2.05 ▲	Hope Welker	Australia	Hancock Prospecting	n/a	not listed
42 ▲	2.05 ▲	Ginia Rinehart	Australia	Hancock Prospecting	n/a	not listed
43 ▼	2.05	Tony Perich and family	Australia	Agriculture; property	36 ▲	2.05 ▲
44 ▲	2.04 ▲	Kie Chie Wong and family	Australia	Investor; resources	103 ▲	0.896 ▲
45 ▼	2.03 ▼	John Van Lieshout	Australia	Retail	29 ▲	2.51 ▲
46 ▲	2.02 ▲	Greg Goodman and family	Australia	Goodman Group; property	61 ▲	1.43 ▲
47 ▼	1.98 ▲	Bob Ell	Australia	Property	44 ▲	1.84 ▲
48 ▼	1.95 ▼	Ye Lipei	Australia	Property	37 ▼	2.05 ▼
49 ▼	1.92 ▼	Nigel Austin	Australia	Cotton On Group; retail	27 ▲	2.68 ▲
50 ▲	1.86 ▲	Nick Molnar	Australia	Afterpay; technology	194 ▲	0.487 ▲
51 ▲	1.86 ▲	Anthony Eisen	Australia	Afterpay; technology	195 ▲	0.487 ▲
52 ▼	1.86 ▼	Tim Roberts	Australia	Ex-Multiplex; investment	30 ▲	2.72 ▲
53 ▲	1.83 ▲	Michael Heine and family	Australia	Financial services	57 ▲	1.55 ▲
54 ▼	1.79 ▼	Sam and Andrew Buckeridge and family	Australia	Buckeridge Group of Companies	41 ▲	1.88 ▲
55 ▲	1.79 ▲	Russell Withers and family	Australia	Retail	67 ▼	1.33 ▲
56 ▲	1.77 ▲	Gretel Packer AM	Australia	Crown Resorts; investment	80 ▼	1.16 ▼
57 ▼	1.69 ▲	Paul Salteri AM and family	Australia	Investment	54 ▲	1.57 ▲
58 ▲	1.67 ▲	Andrew Budzinski	Cyprus	IC Markets; financial services	n/a	not listed
59 ▼	1.67 ▼	Paul Little AO	Australia	Toll Holdings	45 ▲	1.77 ▲
60 ▼	1.59 ▲	Jonathan Munz and family	Australia	Manufacturing	53 ▲	1.58 ▲
61 ▼	1.58 ▲	Khalil Shahin and family	Australia	Retail	59 ▲	1.49 ▲
62 ▼	1.57 ▲	John Casella and family	Australia	Agriculture	55 ▲	1.55 ▲
63 ▲	1.54 ▲	Bruce Mathieson	Australia	Gaming; investments	68 ▼	1.32 ▲
64 ▼	1.53 ▼	Sam Tarascio	Australia	Property	46 ▲	1.72 ▲
65 ▼	1.49 ▼	Alex Waislitz	Australia	Investment	56 ▼	1.56 ▲
66 ▲	1.48 ▲	Raymond Barro and family	Australia	Construction	49 ▲	1.65 ▲
67 ▲	1.47 ▲	Hamish Douglass	Australia	Financial services	117 ▲	0.805 ▲
68 ▲	1.46 ▲	Chris Mackay	Australia	Financial services	104 ▲	0.890 ▲
69 ▼	1.44 ▲	Judith Neilson	Australia	Investment	65 ▼	1.35 ▼
70 ▼	1.43 ▼	Chris Wallin	Australia	QCoal; resources	42 ▼	1.88 ▲
71 ▲	1.42 ▲	Peter Gunn	Australia	Logistics; investment; property	77 ▼	1.19 ▲
72 ▼	1.41 ▼	Morry Fraid, Zac Freid and family	Australia	Retail; property	50 ▼	1.61
73 ▼	1.38 ▼	Kerr Neilson	Australia	Financial services	60 ▼	1.49 ▼
74 ▼	1.37 ▼	Chris Thomas	Australia	Agriculture	64 ▲	1.39 ▲
75 ▼	1.36 ▲	Paul Lederer	Australia	Ex-Primo smallgoods; investment	70 ▲	1.31 ▲
76 ▼	1.35 ▲	Maha Sinnathamby	Australia	Residential property	72 ▼	1.27 ▲
77 ▲	1.32 ▲	Eddie Hirsch	Australia	United Petroleum	n/a	not listed
78 ▲	1.32 ▲	Avi Silver	Australia	United Petroleum	n/a	not listed
79 ▼	1.31 ▲	Nick Politis AM	Australia	Retail; property	74 ▼	1.23 ▼
80 ▼	1.30 ▼	Alan Rydge	Australia	Rydges Hotels & Resorts; Event Cinemas	52 ▼	1.58 ▲
81 ▼	1.28 ▼	Huang Bingwen and family	Australia	Manufacturing	48 ▼	1.69 ▲
82 ▼	1.25 ▼	Con Makris and family	Australia	Property	69 ▼	1.32 ▲
83	1.25 ▲	Nicholas Paspaley and family	Australia	Paspaley Pearls	83 ▲	1.12 ▲
84 ▼	1.21 ▼	Bill Roche and Imelda Roche AO	Australia	Retail	62 ▲	1.42 ▲
85 ▼	1.20 ▼	Nechama Werdiger and family	Australia	Property	66 ▲	1.34 ▲
86 ▲	1.19 ▲	John Richards and family	Australia	Waste management	133 ▲	0.729 ▲
87 ▼	1.17	Lyn Ingham and family	Australia	Ex-Inghams Enterprises; manufacturing	79 ▼	1.17 ▲
88 ▼	1.17 ▲	Reg and Hazel Rowe	Australia	Super Retail Group; property	85 ▲	1.10 ▲
89 ▼	1.16 ▼	Robert Millner and family	Australia	Soul Patts; investment	71 ▼	1.30 ▲
90 ▼	1.13 ▲	Sandy Oatley and family	Australia	Agriculture; property; tourism	87 ▼	1.09 ▲
91 ▼	1.12 ▼	Sam Chong	Australia	Resources; hotels	73 ▲	1.24 ▲
92 ▼	1.10 ▼	John Kahlbetzer	Australia	Agriculture	47 ▼	1.70
93 ▼	1.10 ▲	Jack Gance	Australia	Chemist Warehouse; retail	92 ▲	0.989 ▲
94 ▼	1.08 ▼	Ralph Sarich AO	Australia	Investment; property	76 ▼	1.20 ▼
95 ▲	1.08 ▲	Dick Honan	Australia	Manildra Group	102 ▲	0.905 ▲
96 ▲	1.08 ▲	Dale Elphinstone	Australia	Elphinstone Group; mining services	116 ▼	0.814 ▲
97 ▲	1.06 ▲	Raphael Geminder	Australia	Manufacturing	98 ▼	0.957
98 ▼	1.06 ▲	Mario Verrocchi	Australia	Chemist Warehouse	97 ▼	0.960 ▲
99 ▼	1.06 ▲	Shaun Bonétt	Australia	Precision Group; property	90 ▲	1.00 ▲
100 ▲	1.02 ▲	Trevor Lee	Australia	Agriculture	136 ▼	0.705 ▲
101 ▼	1.00 ▼	Justin Hemmes	Australia	Hotels; property	88 ▼	1.06 ▲
102 ▼	1.00 ▼	Denis Wagner and family	Australia	Construction; mining services	84	1.10 ▲
103 ▲	1.00 ▲	Chris Ellison	Australia	Resources	148 ▼	0.661 ▼
104 ▲	1.00 ▲	Cameron Adams	Australia	Canva	n/a	not listed
105 ▼	0.994 ▼	Jamuna Gurung and Shesh Ghale	Australia	Melbourne Institute of Technology	78 ▲	1.18 ▲
106 ▼	0.992 ▼	Gordon Fu and family	Australia	Property	89 ▼	1.04 ▲
107 ▼	0.983 ▲	Peter Scanlon and family	Australia	Patrick Corporation	93 ▼	0.977 ▲
108 ▼	0.922 ▼	Chris Morris	Australia	Computershare; financial services	82 ▼	1.13 ▲
109 ▲	0.904 ▲	Rod Spooner and family	Australia	Property	113 ▲	0.834 ▲
110 ▼	0.896 ▼	Lloyd Williams	Australia	Property; thoroughbreds	100 ▼	0.914 ▲
111 ▲	0.892 ▲	Bruce Gordon	Australia	Media	134 ▼	0.728 ▲
112 ▼	0.891 ▲	John Symond AM	Australia	Ex-Aussie Home Loans	157 ▼	0.638 ▲
113 ▼	0.884 ▼	Laurie Sutton	Australia	Retail	96 ▲	0.966 ▲
114 ▼	0.871	Joy Chambers-Grundy	Australia	Media	108 ▲	0.871 ▲
115 ▼	0.866 ▼	Ervin Vidor AM and Charlotte Vidor	Australia	Property; hotels	95 ▼	0.973 ▲
116 ▲	0.853 ▲	Mark Creasy	Australia	Resources	149 ▼	0.660 ▼
117 ▼	0.839 ▼	Shangjin Lin and family, Yunhui Lin	Australia	Property	107 ▲	0.882 ▲
118 ▲	0.817 ▲	Eddie Machaalani	Australia	Technology	n/a	not listed
119 ▼	0.835 ▼	Manny Stul and family	Australia	Moose Toys; retail	51 ▼	1.60 ▼
120 ▼	0.834 ▼	Marnie Lewis-Millar, Shay Lewis-Thorp and family	Australia	Property	110 ▲	0.851 ▲
121 ▼	0.827 ▼	Andrew Roberts	Australia	Ex-Multiplex; property	106 ▼	0.885 ▲
122 ▲	0.820 ▲	Anthony Hall	Australia	Technology	186 ▲	0.514 ▲
123 ▲	0.802 ▲	Rod Duke	Australia	Briscoe Group	127 ▼	0.761 ▲
124 ▼	0.798 ▼	Spiros Psarras	Australia	Travel; property	99 ▼	0.931 ▲
125 ▼	0.795 ▲	Naomi Milgrom AO	Australia	Sussan; Sportsgirl; Suzanne Grae	121 ▲	0.781 ▲
126 ▼	0.793 ▲	Harry Stamoulis and family	Australia	Manufacturing	125	0.767 ▲
127 ▼	0.791 ▲	Allan Myers AC, QC	Australia	Investment; agriculture	123 ▼	0.771 ▲
128 ▲	0.783 ▲	Tony Walls	Australia	Technology	n/a	not listed
129 ▲	0.780 ▲	Mitchell Harper	Australia	Technology	n/a	not listed
130 ▼	0.777 ▼	Cyan and Collis Ta'eed and family	Australia	Technology	94 ▲	0.974 ▲
131 ▼	0.775 ▼	Theo Karedis	Australia	Retail; property	115 ▼	0.815 ▲
132 ▼	0.770 ▼	Frank Costa AO and family	Australia	Agriculture	118 ▲	0.802 ▲
133 ▲	0.764 ▲	Diana and Rino Grollo	Australia	Property	171 ▼	0.583 ▲
134 ▲	0.761 ▲	Sam Hupert	Australia	Technology	n/a	not listed
135 ▼	0.760 ▼	Larry Kestelman	Australia	Dodo Services; telecommunications	122 ▼	0.772 ▼
136 ▼	0.758 ▲	Arnold Vitocco	Australia	Property	130 ▲	0.746 ▲
137 ▲	0.754 ▲	Peter Cooper	Australia	Financial services	191 ▼	0.491 ▼
138 ▼	0.740 ▼	Brian Flannery	Australia	Resources	63 ▼	1.40 ▲
139 ▼	0.733 ▲	Neil Rae and family	Australia	Ex-Gull Petroleum	135 ▲	0.713 ▲
140 ▼	0.732 ▲	Travers Duncan	Australia	Resources; property	132 ▼	0.731 ▲
141 ▲	0.731 ▲	Robert Whyte	Australia	Investment	161 ▼	0.620 ▲
142 ▲	0.728 ▲	John Singleton AM	Australia	Media; investment; property	145 ▲	0.670 ▲
143 ▼	0.724 ▼	Paul Baiada and family	Australia	Manufacturing; food production	114 ▲	0.816 ▲
144 ▲	0.721 ▲	Nick DiMauro	Australia	Property	155 ▼	0.646 ▲
145 ▼	0.720 ▼	Jonathan Hallinan	Australia	Property	119 ▲	0.798 ▲
146 ▲	0.715 ▲	George Koukis^{[note 1]}	Switzerland	Software	n/a	not listed
147 ▲	0.703 ▲	Ian Malouf	Australia	Waste services	159 ▲	0.623 ▲
148 ▼	0.702 ▼	Richard Smith	Australia	Food services	91 ▼	1.00 ▲
149 ▲	0.699 ▲	Trevor St Baker AO	Australia	Energy	154 ▲	0.647 ▲
150 ▼	0.695 ▲	Ori Allon	United States	Technology	142 ▲	0.672 ▲
151 ▲	0.694 ▲	Peter Hughes and family	Australia	Agriculture	188 ▼	0.506 ▲
152 ▲	0.693 ▲	Michael Boyd	Australia	Sonic Healthcare	189 ▼	0.503 ▼
153 ▼	0.691 ▼	Christian Beck	Australia	Technology	101 ▼	0.905 ▲
154 ▼	0.690 ▲	Kerry Harmanis	Australia	Resources	147 ▼	0.662 ▲
155 ▲	0.687 ▲	Greg Poche AO	Australia	Ex-StarTrack	156 ▼	0.639 ▼
156 ▲	0.684 ▲	George Kepper	Australia	Technology; property	165 ▼	0.600 ▲
157 ▼	0.684 ▲	Paul Fudge	Australia	Media	138 ▼	0.682 ▲
158 ▼	0.683 ▲	Kim McKendrick and family	Australia	Ex-Godfrey Hirst Carpets	144 ▼	0.670 ▲
159 ▼	0.680 ▼	Jina Chen and Alex Wu	Australia	Healthcare	128 ▼	0.758 ▲
160 ▼	0.667 ▲	Diane Burger and family	Australia	Property	153 ▲	0.651 ▲
161 ▼	0.665 ▼	Max Beck	Australia	Property	143 ▼	0.671 ▲
162 ▼	0.664 ▼	Robert Magid AM	Australia	Property	140 ▲	0.677 ▲
163 ▼	0.662 ▼	Kevin Seymour and family	Australia	Property	124 ▼	0.768 ▲
164 ▲	0.655 ▲	Greg Coffey	United States	Financial services	192 ▼	0.491 ▲
165 ▼	0.646 ▼	Andrew and Michael Buxton	Australia	Property	151 ▼	0.655 ▼
166 ▼	0.645 ▲	Zig Inge and family	Australia	Property	158 ▼	0.637 ▲
167 ▼	0.644 ▼	Terry Peabody	Australia	Ex-Transpacific; investment	152 ▼	0.655 ▲
168 ▲	0.643 ▲	Barry Lambert and family^{[note 1]}	Australia	Financial services	n/a	not listed
169 ▲	0.639 ▲	Don McDonald and family	Australia	Financial services	n/a	not listed
170 ▼	0.634 ▼	Jack Bendat AM	Australia	Property	139 ▼	0.679 ▼
171 ▼	0.632 ▲	Rhonda Wyllie and family	Australia	Investment	162 ▲	0.615 ▲
172 ▼	0.629 ▲	John Higgins	Australia	Investment; services	169 ▼	0.593 ▲
173 ▲	0.617 ▲	Owen Kerr	Australia	Financial services	181 ▼	0.538 ▲
174 ▼	0.613 ▲	David Paradice	United States	Financial services	167 ▼	0.596 ▲
175 ▼	0.611 ▼	Garry Rothwell	Australia	Property	150 ▲	0.656 ▲
176 ▲	0.608 ▲	Will Vicars	Australia	Financial services	185 ▼	0.517 ▲
177 ▲	0.605 ▲	Bob Rose^{[note 1]}	Australia	Property	n/a	not listed
178 ▼	0.601 ▼	Leon Kamenev	Australia	Ex-Menulog; technology	163 ▼	0.605 ▲
179 ▼	0.600	Zeljko Ranogajec	Isle of Man	Gaming	164 ▲	0.600 ▲
180 ▲	0.594 ▲	Judy Brinsmead	Australia	Construction	n/a	not listed
181 ▼	0.584	Arthur Laundy	Australia	Hotels	170	0.584 ▲
182 ▲	0.588 ▲	Gary Johnston	Australia	Jaycar; retail	n/a	not listed
183 ▲	0.587 ▲	Charles Gibbon	Australia	Technology	n/a	not listed
184 ▲	0.585 ▲	Tony Haggarty^{[note 1]}	Australia	Mining	n/a	not listed
185 ▼	0.581 ▼	Tim Gurner	Australia	Property	141 ▲	0.672 ▲
186 ▲	0.580 ▲	Jiwan and Suman Mohan^{[note 1]}	Australia	Agriculture	n/a	not listed
187 ▼	0.579 ▲	Paul Blackburne	Australia	Property	175 ▼	0.567 ▲
188 ▲	0.575 ▲	Ruslan Kogan^{[note 1]}	Australia	Kogan.com; technology	n/a	not listed
189 ▲	0.569 ▲	Geoff Lord^{[note 1]}	Australia	Resources	n/a	not listed
190 ▲	0.564 ▲	Bevan Slattery	Australia	Technology	n/a	not listed
191 ▼	0.560 ▲	Tony Poli	Australia	Resources; property	180 ▼	0.540 ▲
192 ▼	0.556 ▼	Gordon Martin	Australia	Manufacturing	146 ▲	0.663 ▲
193 ▼	0.554 ▼	Grahame Mapp	Australia	Investment	174 ▼	0.574 ▲
194 ▲	0.552 ▲	Larry Diamond	Australia	Zip Co; technology	n/a	not listed
195 ▲	0.550 ▲	Cathie Reid and Stuart Giles	Australia	Helathcare	n/a	not listed
196 ▼	0.549 ▲	Andrew Abercrombie	Australia	Financial services	187 ▼	0.512 ▼
197 ▼	0.547 ▼	Sunny Ngai and family	Australia	Manufacturing	166 ▲	0.598 ▲
198 ▼	0.546 ▼	Danny Hill	Monaco	Property	172 ▼	0.582 ▲
199 ▼	0.545 ▼	Scott Hutchinson and family	Australia	Construction	120 ▲	0.781 ▲
200 ▼	0.540 ▼	Nigel Satterley	Australia	Satterley; property	176 ▼	0.564 ▲

Legend
Icon	Description
Steady	Has not changed from the previous year's list
▲	Has increased from the previous year's list
▼	Has decreased from the previous year's list

== Removed from the 2019 list ==
The following individuals, who appeared on the 2019 Financial Review Rich List, did not appear on the 2020 list:

2019		Name	Citizenship	Source of wealth	Reason (other than financial)
Rank	Net worth A$ bn	Name	Citizenship	Source of wealth	Reason (other than financial)
81 ▼	1.14 ▲	Jeff Chapman	Australia	Financial services	
86 ▲	1.10 ▲	Tim Kentley-Klay	Australia	Technology	
105 ▼	0.885 ▲	Patrick Grove	Australia	Technology	
109 ▼	0.852 ▼	Graham Turner	Australia	Flight Centre; hotels	
111 ▼	0.851 ▼	Geoff Harris	Australia	Flight Centre; investment	
112 ▼	0.842 ▼	Bill James	Australia	Retail	
126 ▼	0.765 ▲	Andrew Muir	Australia	The Good Guys	
129 ▼	0.755 ▲	Iris Lustig-Moar and Max Moar	Australia	Property	
131 ▲	0.745 ▲	Greg Farrell and family	Australia	Federal Group; gaming	
137 ▼	0.696 ▲	Mick Power	Australia	Construction	
160 ▼	0.623 ▲	Jamie Pherous	Australia	Travel services	
168 ▼	0.594 ▲	Christina and Tony Quinn	Australia	Darrell Lea; retail	
173 ▼	0.575 ▲	Graham Tuckwell	Jersey	Financial services	
177 ▼	0.560 ▲	Tony Wales	Australia	Ex-Computershare; investment	
178 ▲	0.554 ▲	Jerry Schwartz	Australia	Hotels	
179 ▼	0.541 ▲	Kevin Maloney	Australia	Mining services	
182 ▲	0.530 ▲	Stephen Ring and family	Australia	Ex-Swisse	
183 ▼	0.523 ▼	Hilton Nathanson	Australia	Financial services	
184 ▼	0.520 ▲	Seumas Dawes	Australia	Financial services	
190 ▼	0.500 ▼	Ian Roberts	Australia	Healthcare	
193 ▲	0.489 ▲	Neville Bertalli	Australia	Retail	
196 ▲	0.486 ▲	Tobias Pearce and Kayla Itsines	Australia	Technology	
197 ▲	0.485 ▲	Alan and Irene Messer	Australia	Healthcare	
198 ▼	0.479	Steven Kalmin	Australia	Glencore	
199 ▼	0.479 ▲	Rod Jones	Australia	Navitas Group	
200 ▲	0.472 ▲	Patricia Ilhan	Australia	Crazy John's	

== Notes ==
- ^1: Individual was listed on a previous year's list, that was not the 2019 Rich List.

== See also ==
- Financial Review Rich List
- Forbes Asia list of Australians by net worth
