= Financial Review Rich List 2019 =

Annual list of wealthiest Australians

The Financial Review Rich List 2019 is the 36th^{[note a]} annual survey of the 200 wealthiest people resident in Australia, published by theAustralian Financial Review on 31 May 2019.

The net worth of the wealthiest individual, Anthony Pratt, was A$15.77 billion; while the net worth of the 200th wealthiest individual, Patricia Ilhan, was A$472 million; up from A$387 million in 2018. The combined wealth of the 200 individuals was calculated as A$342 billion; compared with a combined wealth of A$6.4 billion in 1984 when the BRW Rich 200 commenced. Twenty-six women were included on the 2019 Rich List, representing 13 percent of the list; up from seventeen in 2018, or 8.5 percent. The list included seventeen debutants.

== List of individuals ==
2019		Name	Citizenship	Source of wealth	2018	
Rank	Net worth A$ bn	Name	Citizenship	Source of wealth	Rank	Net worth A$ bn
1	15.77 ▲	Anthony Pratt	Australia	Visy; Pratt Industries	1	12.90 ▲
2 ▲	13.81 ▲	Gina Rinehart	Australia	Hancock Prospecting; investment	3	12.68 ▲
3 ▼	13.54 ▲	Harry Triguboff AO	Australia	Meriton	2	12.77 ▲
4	10.39 ▲	Hui Wing Mau	People's Republic of China; Australia	Shimao Property	4 ▲	9.09 ▲
5 ▲	9.75 ▲	Scott Farquhar	Australia	Atlassian	11 ▲	5.16 ▲
6 ▲	9.63 ▲	Mike Cannon-Brookes	Australia	Atlassian	12 ▲	5.16 ▲
7 ▼	8.57 ▲	Sir Frank Lowy AC	Australia	ex-Westfield; property (shopping centres)	5 ▼	8.42 ▲
8	7.99 ▲	Andrew Forrest AO	Australia	Fortescue	8 ▼	6.10 ▼
9 ▼	7.17 ▼	Ivan Glasenberg	Australia; South Africa; Switzerland	Glencore commodities trading	6 ▼	8.32 ▲
10 ▼	6.60 ▲	John Gandel AC	Australia	Property (shopping centres)	7	6.45 ▲
11 ▲	5.69 ▲	Kerry Stokes AC	Australia	Property; Seven West Media; resources	13 ▲	4.93 ▲
12 ▼	5.50 ▼	Vivek Chaand Sehgal	Australia	Motherson Sumi Systems	9 ▲	5.88 ▲
13 ▼	4.94 ▼	James Packer	Australia	Crown Resorts; Consolidated Media Holdings	10 ▼	5.50 ▲
14 ▲	4.67 ▲	Lang Walker	Australia	Walker Corporation (property)	18 ▼	3.47 ▲
15 ▲	4.09 ▲	Clive Palmer	Australia	Mineralogy and other mining interests; hospitality	20 ▲	2.84 ▲
16	4.07 ▲	Alan Wilson and family	Australia	Reece Group	16 ▲	3.87 ▲
17 ▼	4.01 ▼	Len Ainsworth AM	Australia	Gaming; manufacturing	14 ▼	4.02 ▲
18 ▲	3.62 ▲	Lachlan Murdoch	United States; United Kingdom; Australia	Media	n/a	not listed
19 ▲	3.61 ▲	Bianca Rinehart	Australia	Resources	19 ▼	3.28 ▲
20 ▲	3.31 ▲	Richard White	Australia	Technology	44	1.66 ▲
21 ▼	3.31 ▼	Lindsay Fox AC	Australia	Linfox; property	17 ▼	3.56 ▲
22 ▲	3.10 ▲	Prudence MacLeod	Australia	News Corporation and Times Newspapers	n/a	not listed
23 ▼	2.90 ▲	David Hains	Australia	Investment	21 ▼	2.69 ▲
24 ▼	2.83 ▲	Solomon Lew	Australia	Premier Investments; retail	23 ▼	2.55 ▲
25 ▼	2.79 ▲	Jack Cowin	Australia	Competitive Foods Australia; investment	24 ▼	2.41 ▲
26 ▼	2.72 ▲	Sir Michael Hintze GCSG, AM	Australia; United Kingdom	Retail; investment	22 ▲	2.43 ▲
27 ▲	2.68 ▲	Nigel Austin	Australia	Cotton On Group; retail	32	1.96 ▲
28 ▲	2.62 ▲	Angela Bennett	Australia	Mining	27 ▲	2.17 ▲
29 ▲	2.51 ▲	John Van Lieshout	Australia	Retail	33	1.92 ▲
30 ▲	2.72 ▲	Tim Roberts	Australia	Ex-Multiplex; investment	73	1.09 ▲
31 ▼	2.38 ▲	Alexandra Burt and Leonie Baldock	Australia	Resources	30	2.08 ▲
32 ▲	2.37 ▲	Betty Klimenko, Monica Weinberg-Saunders and family	Australia	Property	n/a	not listed
33 ▲	2.34 ▲	Michael Hodgson	Australia	Property	n/a	not listed
34 ▼	2.34 ▼	Marc Besen and family	Australia	Retail	25 ▼	2.40 ▲
35 ▼	2.33 ▲	Maurice Alter and family	Australia	Retail	26 ▲	2.26 ▲
36 ▲	2.05 ▲	Tony Perich and family	Australia	Agriculture; property	37	1.76 ▲
37 ▼	2.05 ▼	Ye Lipei	Australia	Property	29	2.12 ▲
38	2.03 ▲	David and Vicky Teoh	Australia	Telecommunications	38	1.76 ▼
39 ▲	2.00 ▲	Brett Blundy	Australia	Retail; property; agriculture	41	1.71 ▲
40 ▼	1.90 ▼	Gerry Harvey	Australia	Harvey Norman Holdings	28 ▼	2.12 ▼
41 ▲	1.88 ▲	Sam and Andrew Buckeridge and family	Australia	Buckeridge Group of Companies	n/a	not listed
42 ▼	1.88 ▲	Chris Wallin	Australia	Resources	34	1.79 ▲
43 ▲	1.86 ▲	Terry Snow AM	Australia	Capital Airport Group; property	52	1.46 ▲
44 ▲	1.84 ▲	Bob Ell	Australia	Property	48	1.56 ▲
45 ▲	1.77 ▲	Paul Little AO	Australia	Toll Holdings	50	1.54 ▲
46 ▲	1.72 ▲	Sam Tarascio	Australia	Property	51	1.54 ▲
47 ▼	1.70	John Kahlbetzer	Australia	Agriculture	42	1.70 ▲
48 ▼	1.69 ▲	Huang Bingwen and family	Australia	Manufacturing	43 ▼	1.66 ▼
49 ▲	1.65 ▲	Raymond Barro and family	Australia	Construction	n/a	not listed
50 ▼	1.61	Morry Fraid, Zac Freid and family	Australia	Retail; property	46	1.61 ▲
51 ▼	1.60 ▼	Manny Stul and family	Australia	Moose Toys; retail	40	1.73 ▲
52 ▼	1.58 ▲	Alan Rydge	Australia	Rydges Hotels & Resorts; Event Cinemas	49 ▼	1.56 ▼
53 ▲	1.58 ▲	Jonathan Munz and family	Australia	Manufacturing	62	1.24 ▲
54 ▲	1.57 ▲	Paul Salteri AM and family	Australia	Investment	57	1.28 ▲
55 ▲	1.55 ▲	John Casella and family	Australia	Agriculture	n/a	not listed
56 ▼	1.56 ▲	Alex Waislitz	Australia	Investment	54	1.39 ▲
57 ▲	1.55 ▲	Michael Heine and family	Australia	Financial services	58 ▲	1.27 ▲
58 ▼	1.55 ▼	Chau Chak Wing	Australia	Property; investments	45	1.63 ▲
59 ▲	1.49 ▲	Yasser, Samer, and Khalil Shahin and family	Australia	Retail	n/a	not listed
60 ▼	1.49 ▼	Kerr Neilson	Australia	Financial services	35	1.78 ▲
61 ▲	1.43 ▲	Greg Goodman and family	Australia	Goodman Group; property	70	1.15 ▲
62 ▲	1.42 ▲	Bill Roche and Imelda Roche AO	Australia	Retail	146	0.566 ▲
63 ▼	1.40 ▲	Brian Flannery	Australia	Resources	56	1.33 ▲
64 ▲	1.39 ▲	Chris Thomas	Australia	Agriculture	65	1.20 ▲
65 ▼	1.35 ▼	Judith Neilson	Australia	Investment	36	1.77 ▲
66 ▲	1.34 ▲	Nechama Werdiger and family	Australia	Property	87	0.859 ▲
67 ▼	1.33 ▲	Russell Withers and family	Australia	Retail	59	1.27 ▲
68 ▼	1.32 ▲	Bruce Mathieson	Australia	Gaming; investments	66	1.18 ▲
69 ▼	1.32 ▲	Con Makris and family	Australia	Property	60	1.26 ▲
70 ▲	1.31 ▲	Paul Lederer	Australia	Ex-Primo smallgoods; investment	71	1.14 ▲
71 ▼	1.30 ▲	Robert Millner and family	Australia	Soul Patts; investment	69 ▲	1.16 ▲
72 ▼	1.27 ▲	Maha Sinnathamby	Australia	Residential property	64	1.21 ▲
73 ▲	1.24 ▲	Sam Chong	Australia	Resources; hotels	92	0.817 ▲
74 ▼	1.23 ▼	Nick Politis AM	Australia	Retail; property	55	1.35 ▲
75 ▲	1.21 ▲	Peter, Andrew and Lex Greensill	Australia	Financial services; agriculture	n/a	not listed
76 ▼	1.20 ▼	Ralph Sarich AO	Australia	Investment; property	63	1.23 ▲
77 ▼	1.19 ▲	Peter Gunn	Australia	Logistics; investment; property	67	1.17 ▲
78 ▲	1.18 ▲	Jamuna Gurung and Shesh Ghale	Australia	Melbourne Institute of Technology	81	0.647 ▲
79 ▼	1.17 ▲	Bob Ingham AO	Australia	Ex-Inghams Enterprises	68	1.16 ▼
80 ▼	1.16 ▼	Gretel Packer	Australia	Crown Resorts; investment	61	1.26 ▲
81 ▼	1.14 ▲	Jeff Chapman	Australia	Financial services	72	1.13 ▲
82 ▼	1.13 ▲	Chris Morris	Australia	Computershare; financial services	76	1.02 ▲
83 ▲	1.12 ▲	Nicholas Paspaley and family	Australia	Paspaley Pearls	n/a	not listed
84	1.10 ▲	Joseph, Neill, Denis and John Wagner	Australia	Construction; mining services		1.28
85 ▲	1.10 ▲	Reg and Hazel Rowe	Australia	Super Retail Group; property	75	1.14 ▼
86 ▲	1.10 ▲	Tim Kentley-Klay	Australia	Technology	143	0.58 ▲
87 ▼	1.09 ▲	Sandy Oatley and family	Australia	Agriculture; property; tourism	74	1.07 ▲
88 ▼	1.06 ▲	Justin Hemmes	Australia	Hotels; property	78 ▲	0.951 ▲
89 ▼	1.04 ▲	Gordon Fu and family	Australia	Property	88	0.858 ▼
90 ▲	1.00 ▲	Shaun Bonétt	Australia	Precision Group; property	96	0.784 ▲
91 ▼	1.00 ▲	Richard Smith	Australia	Food services	77	0.999 ▲
92 ▲	0.989 ▲	Jack Gance	Australia	Chemist Warehouse; retail	93	0.813 ▲
93 ▼	0.977 ▲	Peter Scanlon and family	Australia	Patrick Corporation	90	0.843 ▲
94 ▲	0.974 ▲	Cyan and Collis Ta'eed and family	Australia	Technology	n/a	not listed
95 ▼	0.973 ▲	Ervin and Charlotte Vidor	Australia	Property; hotels	79	0.927 ▲
96 ▲	0.966 ▲	Laurie Sutton	Australia	Retail	188	0.432 ▼
97 ▼	0.960 ▲	Mario Verrocchi	Australia	Chemist Warehouse	94	0.803 ▲
98 ▼	0.957	Raphael Geminder	Australia	Manufacturing	53	0.957 ▼
99 ▼	0.931 ▲	Spiros Alysandratos	Australia	Travel; property	83	0.869 ▲
100 ▼	0.914 ▲	Lloyd Williams	Australia	Property; thoroughbreds	95	0.787 ▲
101 ▼	0.905 ▲	Christian Beck	Australia	Technology	99	0.775 ▲
102 ▲	0.905 ▲	Dick Honan	Australia	Manildra Group	179	0.475 ▲
103 ▲	0.896 ▲	Kie Chie Wong and family	Australia	Investor; resources	n/a	not listed
104 ▲	0.890 ▲	Chris Mackay	Australia	Financial services	118	0.680 ▲
105 ▼	0.885 ▲	Patrick Grove	Australia	Technology	89	0.850 ▲
106 ▼	0.885 ▲	Andrew Roberts	Australia	Ex-Multiplex; property	91	0.822 ▲
107 ▲	0.882 ▲	Shangjin Lin and family	Australia	Property	n/a	not listed
108 ▲	0.871 ▲	Joy Chambers-Grundy	Australia	Media	n/a	not listed
109 ▼	0.852 ▼	Graham Turner	Australia	Flight Centre; hotels	86	0.861 ▲
110 ▲	0.851 ▲	Marnie Lewis-Millar and Shay Lewis-Thorp	Australia	Property	n/a	not listed
111 ▼	0.851 ▼	Geoff Harris	Australia	Flight Centre; investment	84	0.867 ▲
112 ▼	0.842 ▼	Bill James	Australia	Retail	85	0.863 ▲
113 ▲	0.834 ▲	Rod Spooner and family	Australia	Property	n/a	not listed
114 ▲	0.816 ▲	John Camilleri and family	Australia	Manufacturing; food production	n/a	not listed
115 ▼	0.815 ▲	Theo Karedis	Australia	Retail; property	105	0.737 ▲
116 ▼	0.814 ▲	Dale Elphinstone	Australia	Elphinstone Group; mining services	104	0.739 ▲
117 ▲	0.805 ▲	Hamish Douglass	Australia	Financial services	135	0.617 ▲
118 ▲	0.802 ▲	Frank Costa AO and family	Australia	Agriculture	127	0.655 ▲
119 ▲	0.798 ▲	Jonathan Hallinan	Australia	Property	123	0.667 ▲
120 ▲	0.781 ▲	Scott Hutchinson and family	Australia	Construction	n/a	not listed
121 ▲	0.781 ▲	Naomi Milgrom AO	Australia	Sussan; Sportsgirl; Suzanne Grae	133 ▼	0.625 ▲
122 ▼	0.772 ▼	Larry Kestelman	Australia	Dodo Services; telecommunications	97	0.784 ▲
123 ▼	0.771 ▲	Allan Myers AC, QC	Australia	Investment; agriculture	102	0.749 ▲
124 ▼	0.768 ▲	Kevin Seymour and family	Australia	Property	108	0.714 ▲
125	0.767 ▲	Harry Stamoulis and family	Australia	Manufacturing	125	0.660 ▲
126 ▼	0.765 ▲	Andrew Muir	Australia	The Good Guys	109	0.708 ▲
127 ▼	0.761 ▲	Rod Duke	Australia	Briscoe Group	103	0.744 ▼
128 ▼	0.758 ▲	Jina Chen and Alex Wu	Australia	Healthcare	100	0.756 ▲
129 ▼	0.755 ▲	Iris Lustig-Moar and Max Moar	Australia	Property	106	0.730 ▲
130 ▲	0.746 ▲	Arnold Vitocco	Australia	Property	n/a	not listed
131 ▲	0.745 ▲	Greg Farrell and family	Australia	Federal Group; gaming	n/a	not listed
132 ▼	0.731 ▲	Travers Duncan	Australia	Resources; property	110	0.706 ▲
133 ▲	0.729 ▲	John Richards and family	Australia	Waste management	n/a	not listed
134 ▼	0.728 ▲	Bruce Gordon	Australia	Media	113▲	0.702 ▲
135 ▲	0.713 ▲	Neil Rae	Australia	Ex-Gull Petroleum	n/a	not listed
136 ▼	0.705 ▲	Trevor Lee	Australia	Agriculture	130	0.646 ▲
137 ▼	0.696 ▲	Mick Power	Australia	Construction	115	0.689 ▼
138 ▼	0.682 ▲	Paul Fudge	Australia	Media	121	0.673 ▲
139 ▼	0.679 ▼	Jack Bendat AM	Australia	Property	111	0.704 ▲
140 ▲	0.677 ▲	Robert Magid AM	Australia	Property	168	0.513 ▲
141 ▲	0.672 ▲	Tim Gurner	Australia	Property	144	0.574 ▲
142 ▲	0.672 ▲	Ori Allon	Australia	Technology	191	0.413 ▲
143 ▼	0.671 ▲	Max Beck	Australia	Property	124	0.660 ▲
144 ▼	0.670 ▲	Kim McKendrick and family	Australia	Ex-Godfrey Hirst Carpets	126	0.657 ▲
145 ▲	0.670 ▲	John Singleton	Australia	Media; investment; property	161	0.534 ▲
146 ▲	0.663 ▲	Gordon Martin	Australia	Manufacturing	148	0.561 ▲
147 ▼	0.662 ▲	Kerry Harmanis	Australia	Resources	128	0.654 ▲
148 ▼	0.661 ▼	Chris Ellison	Australia	Resources	98	0.783 ▲
149 ▼	0.660 ▼	Mark Creasy	Australia	Resources	114	0.689 ▲
150 ▲	0.656 ▲	Garry Rothwell	Australia	Property	n/a	not listed
151 ▼	0.655 ▼	Andrew and Michael Buxton	Australia	Property	119	0.676 ▲
152 ▼	0.655 ▲	Terry Peabody	Australia	Ex-Transpacific; investment	131	0.638 ▲
153 ▲	0.651 ▲	Diane Burger and family	Australia	Property	n/a	not listed
154 ▲	0.647 ▲	Trevor St Baker	Australia	Energy	180	0.472 ▲
155 ▼	0.646 ▲	Nick DiMauro	Australia	Property	136	0.611 ▲
156 ▼	0.639 ▼	Greg Poche	Australia	Ex-StarTrack	129	0.651 ▲
157 ▼	0.638 ▲	John Symond AM	Australia	Ex-Aussie Home Loans	134	0.621 ▼
158 ▼	0.637 ▲	Zig Inge and family	Australia	Property	132	0.631 ▲
159 ▲	0.623 ▲	Ian Malouf	Australia	Waste services	n/a	not listed
160 ▼	0.623 ▲	Jamie Pherous	Australia	Travel services	141	0.586 ▲
161 ▼	0.620 ▲	Robert Whyte	Australia	Investment	156	0.536 ▲
162 ▲	0.615 ▲	Rhonda Wyllie and family	Australia	Investment	n/a	not listed
163 ▼	0.605 ▲	Leon Kamenev	Australia	Ex-Menulog; technology	138	0.589 ▲
164 ▲	0.600 ▲	Zeljko Ranogajec	Australia	Gaming	n/a	not listed
165 ▼	0.600 ▲	George Kepper	Australia	Technology; property	157	0.535 ▼
166 ▲	0.598 ▲	Sunny Ngai and family	Australia	Manufacturing	n/a	not listed
167 ▼	0.596 ▲	David Paradice	Australia	Financial services	165	0.519 ▲
168 ▼	0.594 ▲	Christina and Tony Quinn	Australia	Darrell Lea; retail	139	0.588 ▲
169 ▼	0.593 ▲	John Higgins	Australia	Investment; services	154	0.549 ▲
170	0.584 ▲	Arthur Laundy	Australia	Hotels	170	0.506 ▲
171 ▼	0.583 ▲	Diana and Rino Grollo	Australia	Property	158	0.534 ▲
172 ▼	0.582 ▲	Danny Hill	Australia	Property	142	0.580 ▲
173 ▼	0.575 ▲	Graham Tuckwell	Australia	Financial services	149	0.560 ▲
174 ▼	0.574 ▲	Grahame Mapp	Australia	Investment	150	0.559 ▲
175 ▼	0.567 ▲	Paul Blackburne	Australia	Property	152	0.553 ▲
176 ▼	0.564 ▲	Nigel Satterley	Australia	Satterley; property	155	0.546 ▼
177 ▼	0.560 ▲	Tony Wales	Australia	Ex-Computershare; investment	167	0.519 ▲
178 ▲	0.554 ▲	Jerry Schwartz	Australia	Hotels	n/a	not listed
179 ▼	0.541 ▲	Kevin Maloney	Australia	Mining services	160	0.534 ▲
180 ▼	0.540 ▲	Tony Poli	Australia	Resources; property	162	0.529 ▲
181 ▼	0.538 ▲	Owen Kerr	Australia	Financial services	182	0.459 ▲
182 ▲	0.530 ▲	Stephen Ring and family	Australia	Ex-Swisse	n/a	not listed
183 ▼	0.523 ▼	Hilton Nathanson	Australia	Financial services	163	0.527 ▲
184 ▼	0.520 ▲	Seumas Dawes	Australia	Financial services	172	0.503 ▲
185 ▼	0.517 ▲	Will Vicars	Australia	Financial services	164	0.527 ▲
186 ▲	0.514 ▲	Anthony Hall	Australia	Technology	n/a	not listed
187 ▼	0.512 ▼	Andrew Abercrombie	Australia	Financial services	153	0.549 ▼
188 ▼	0.506 ▲	Peter Hughes and family	Australia	Agriculture	175	0.491 ▲
189 ▼	0.503 ▼	Michael Boyd	Australia	Sonic Healthcare	169	0.511 ▲
190 ▼	0.500 ▼	Ian Roberts	Australia	Healthcare	166	0.519 ▼
191 ▼	0.491 ▼	Peter Cooper	Australia	Financial services	173	0.499 ▼
192 ▼	0.491 ▲	Greg Coffey	Australia	Financial services	177	0.486 ▲
193 ▲	0.489 ▲	Neville Bertalli	Australia	Retail	n/a	not listed
194 ▲	0.487 ▲	Nick Molnar	Australia	Afterpay	n/a	not listed
195 ▲	0.487 ▲	Anthony Eisen	Australia	Afterpay	n/a	not listed
196 ▲	0.486 ▲	Tobias Pearce and Kayla Itsines	Australia	Technology	n/a	not listed
197 ▲	0.485 ▲	Alan and Irene Messer	Australia	Healthcare	n/a	not listed
198 ▼	0.479	Steven Kalmin	Australia	Glencore	151	0.479 ▲
199 ▼	0.479 ▲	Rod Jones	Australia	Navitas Group	176	0.450 ▲
200 ▲	0.472 ▲	Patricia Ilhan	Australia	Crazy John's	194	0.407 ▲

Legend
Icon	Description
Steady	Has not changed from the previous year's list
▲	Has increased from the previous year's list
▼	Has decreased from the previous year's list

== See also ==
- Financial Review Rich List
- Forbes Asia list of Australians by net worth

== Notes ==
^[note a] : By calculation, the 2019 list is the 36th edition published, despite the reference by Nine Entertainment that the list is the 37th edition published.
