= Financial Review Rich List 2018 =

Annual list of wealthiest Australians

The Financial Review Rich List 2018 is the 35th annual survey of the wealthiest people resident in Australia, published by the Australian Financial Review on 25 May 2018.

The net worth of the wealthiest individual, Anthony Pratt, was A$12.90 billion; while the net worth of the 200th wealthiest individual, Radek Sali, was A$387 million; up from $341 million in 2017. The combined wealth of the 200 individuals was calculated as A$282.7 billion; compared with a combined wealth of A$6.4 billion in 1984 when the BRW Rich 200 commenced. Nineteen women were included on the 2018 Rich List, representing 8.5 percent of the list. The average age was 66 years. The list included a record 76 individuals whose net worth was one billion or more, an increase of 16 from 2017; and about one-quarter of those billionaires lived offshore at the time of the list's publication.

== List of individuals ==
2018		Name	Citizenship	Source of wealth	2017	
Rank	Net worth A$ bn	Name	Citizenship	Source of wealth	Rank	Net worth A$ bn
1	12.90 ▲	Anthony Pratt	Australia	Visy; Pratt Industries	1 ▲	12.60 ▲
2	12.77 ▲	Harry Triguboff AO	Australia	Meriton	2 ▼	11.40 ▲
3	12.68 ▲	Gina Rinehart	Australia	Hancock Prospecting; investment	3 ▲	10.40 ▲
4 ▲	9.09 ▲	Hui Wing Mau	People's Republic of China; Australia	Shimao Property	8 ▼	5.96 ▲
5 ▼	8.42 ▲	Sir Frank Lowy AC	Australia	ex-Westfield; property (shopping centres)	4 ▼	8.26
6 ▼	8.32 ▲	Ivan Glasenberg	Australia; South Africa; Switzerland	Glencore commodities trading	5 ▲	6.85 ▲
7	6.45 ▲	John Gandel AC	Australia	Property (shopping centres)	7 ▼	6.05 ▲
8 ▼	6.10 ▼	Andrew Forrest AO	Australia	Fortescue	6 ▲	6.84 ▲
9 ▲	5.88 ▲	Vivek Chaand Sehgal	Australia	Motherson Sumi Systems	n/a	not listed
10 ▼	5.50 ▲	James Packer	Australia	Crown Resorts; Consolidated Media Holdings	9 ▼	4.79 ▼
11 ▲	5.16 ▲	Scott Farquhar	Australia	Atlassian	18▲	2.51 ▲
12 ▲	5.16 ▲	Mike Cannon-Brookes	Australia	Atlassian	17 ▲	2.51 ▲
13 ▲	4.93 ▲	Kerry Stokes AC	Australia	Property; Seven West Media; resources	14	2.90 ▲
14 ▼	4.02 ▲	Len Ainsworth AM	Australia	Gaming; manufacturing	11	3.07 ▲
15 ▼	3.99 ▲	Stan Perron AM	Australia	Property	10 ▲	3.90 ▲
16 ▲	3.87 ▲	Alan Wilson and family	Australia	Reece Group	n/a	not listed
17 ▼	3.56 ▲	Lindsay Fox AC	Australia	Linfox; property	13	2.91 ▲
18 ▼	3.47 ▲	Lang Walker	Australia	Walker Corporation (property)	12	3.00
19 ▼	3.28 ▲	Bianca Rinehart	Australia	Hancock Prospecting; investment	15 ▲	2.74 ▼
20 ▲	2.84 ▲	Clive Palmer	Australia	Mineralogy and other mining	198 ▲	0.344 ▲
21 ▼	2.61 ▲	David Hains and family	Australia	Investment	16 ▼	2.55 ▲
22 ▲	2.43 ▲	Sir Michael Hintze GCSG, AM	Australia; United Kingdom	Retail; investment	24 ▲	1.98 ▲
23 ▼	2.55 ▲	Solomon Lew	Australia	Premier Investments; retail	19	2.38 ▲
24 ▼	2.41 ▲	Jack Cowin	Australia	Competitive Foods Australia; investment	20	2.38 ▲
25 ▼	2.50 ▲	Marc Besen	Australia	Retail	22	2.24
26 ▲	2.26 ▲	Maurice Alter and family	Australia	Retail		1.81
27 ▲	2.17 ▲	Angela Bennett	Australia	Mining		1.76
28 ▼	2.12 ▼	Gerry Harvey	Australia	Harvey Norman	21	2.34 ▲
29 ▲	2.12 ▲	Ye Lipei	Australia	Property		1.70
30 ▲	2.08 ▲	Alexandra Burt and Leonie Baldock	Australia	Resources		1.56
31	no data available					
32 ▲	1.96 ▲	Nigel Austin	Australia	Cotton On Group; retail		1.89
33 ▲	1.92 ▲	John Van Lieshout	Australia	Retail		1.72
34 ▲	1.79 ▲	Chris Wallin	Australia	Resources		1.13
35 ▲	1.78 ▲	Kerr Neilson	Australia	Financial services		1.44
36 ▲	1.77 ▲	Judith Neilson	Australia	Investment		1.34
37 ▲	1.76 ▲	Tony Perich and family	Australia	Agriculture; property		1.59
38 ▲	1.76 ▼	David and Vicky Teoh	Australia	Telecommunications		1.91
39 ▲	1.96 ▲	Nigel Austin	Australia	Cotton On Group; retail		1.89
40 ▼	1.73 ▲	Manny Stul and family	Australia	Moose Toys; retail	39 ▲	1.42
41 ▲	1.71 ▲	Brett Blundy	Australia	Retail; property; agriculture		1.39
42 ▲	1.70 ▲	John Kahlbetzer	Australia	Agriculture		0.841
43 ▼	1.66 ▼	Huang Bingwen and family	Australia	Manufacturing	25	1.93
44 ▲	1.66 ▲	Richard White	Australia	Technology		0.882
45 ▲	1.63 ▲	Chau Chak Wing	Australia	Property; investments		1.56
46 ▲	1.61 ▲	Morry Fraid, Zac Freid and family	Australia	Retail; property		1.60
47	no data available					
48 ▲	1.56 ▲	Bob Ell	Australia	Property		1.52
49 ▼	1.56 ▼	Alan Rydge	Australia	Rydges Hotels & Resorts; Event Cinemas	23	2.09 ▲
50 ▲	1.54 ▲	Paul Little AO	Australia	Toll Holdings		0.927
51 ▲	1.54 ▲	Sam Tarascio	Australia	Property		1.43
52 ▲	1.46 ▲	Terry Snow AM	Australia	Capital Airport Group; property		1.00
53 ▲	1.40 ▼	Raphael Geminder	Australia	Manufacturing		1.44
54 ▲	1.39 ▲	Alex Waislitz	Australia	Investment		1.24
55 ▲	1.35 ▲	Nick Politis AM	Australia	Retail; property		0.733
56 ▲	1.33 ▲	Brian Flannery	Australia	Resources		0.818
57 ▲	1.28 ▲	Paul Salteri AM and family	Australia	Investment	n/a	not listed
58 ▲	1.27 ▲	Michael Heine and family	Australia	Financial services	n/a	not listed
59 ▲	1.27 ▲	Russell Withers and family	Australia	Retail		1.23
60 ▲	1.26 ▲	Con Makris and family	Australia	Property		1.17
61 ▲	1.26 ▲	Gretel Packer	Australia	Media; Crown Resorts; investment		1.02
62 ▼	1.24 ▲	Jonathan Munz and family	Australia	Manufacturing	50 ▲	1.10
63 ▲	1.23 ▲	Ralph Sarich AO	Australia	Investment; property		1.12
64 ▲	1.21 ▲	Maha Sinnathamby	Australia	Residential property	57	1.02
65 ▲	1.20 ▲	Chris Thomas	Australia	Agriculture		1.12
66 ▲	1.18 ▲	Bruce Mathieson	Australia	Gaming; investments		0.943
67 ▲	1.17 ▲	Peter Gunn	Australia	Logistics; investment; property		1.00
68 ▲	1.16 ▼	Bob Ingham AO	Australia	Ex-Inghams Enterprises		1.19
69 ▲	1.16 ▲	Robert Millner and family	Australia	Soul Patts; investment	n/a	not listed
70 ▲	1.15 ▲	Greg Goodman and family	Australia	Goodman Group; property		1.08
71 ▲	1.14 ▲	Paul Lederer	Australia	Ex-Primo smallgoods; investment		0.824
72 ▲	1.13 ▲	Jeff Chapman	Australia	Financial services		0.811
73 ▲	1.09 ▲	Tim Roberts	Australia	Ex-Multiplex; investment		0.896
74 ▲	1.07 ▲	Sandy Oatley and family	Australia	Agriculture; property; tourism		0.913
75 ▲	1.04 ▼	Reg and Hazel Rowe	Australia	Super Retail Group; property		1.14
76 ▲	1.02 ▲	Chris Morris	Australia	Computershare; financial services		0.847
77 ▲	0.999 ▲	Richard Smith	Australia	Food services		0.891
78 ▲	0.961 ▲	Justin Hemmes and family	Australia	Hotels; property	n/a	not listed
79 ▲	0.927 ▲	Ervin and Charlotte Vidor	Australia	Property; hotels		0.804
80	no data available					
81 ▲	0.876 ▲	Jamuna Gurung and Shesh Ghale	Australia	Melbourne Institute of Technology		0.647
82	no data available					
83 ▲	0.869 ▲	Spiros Alysandratos	Australia	Travel; property		0.582
84 ▲	0.867 ▲	Geoff Harris	Australia	Flight Centre; investment		0.637
85 ▲	0.863 ▲	Bill James	Australia	Retail		0.647
86 ▲	0.861 ▲	Graham Turner	Australia	Flight Centre; hotels		0.620
87 ▲	0.859	Nechama Werdiger and family	Australia	Property		0.859
88 ▲	0.858 ▼	Gordon Fu and family	Australia	Property		0.877
89 ▲	0.850 ▲	Patrick Grove	Australia	Technology		0.801
90 ▲	0.843 ▲	Peter Scanlon and family	Australia	Patrick Corporation		0.772
91 ▲	0.822 ▲	Andrew Roberts	Australia	Ex-Multiplex; property		0.819
92 ▲	0.817 ▲	Sam Chong	Australia	Resources; hotels		0.440
93 ▲	0.813 ▲	Jack Gance	Australia	Chemist Warehouse; retail		0.546
94 ▲	0.803 ▲	Mario Verrocchi	Australia	Chemist Warehouse		0.558
95 ▲	0.787 ▲	Lloyd Williams	Australia	Property; thoroughbreds		0.784
96 ▲	0.784 ▲	Shaun Bonétt	Australia	Precision Group; property		0.718
97 ▲	0.784 ▲	Larry Kestelman	Australia	Dodo Services; telecommunications		0.749
98 ▲	0.783 ▲	Chris Ellison	Australia	Resources		0.754
99 ▲	0.775 ▲	Christian Beck	Australia	Technology		0.619
100 ▲	0.756 ▲	Jina Chen and Alex Wu	Australia	Healthcare		0.686
101	no data available					
102 ▲	0.749 ▲	Allan Myers AC, QC	Australia	Investment; agriculture		0.682
103 ▲	0.744 ▼	Rod Duke	Australia	Briscoe Group		0.751
104 ▲	0.739 ▲	Dale Elphinstone	Australia	Elphinstone Group; mining services		0.475
105 ▲	0.737 ▲	Theo Karedis	Australia	Retail; property		0.723
106 ▲	0.730 ▲	Iris Lustig-Moar and Max Moar	Australia	Property		0.694
107	no data available					
108 ▲	0.714 ▲	Kevin Seymour and family	Australia	Property		0.679
109 ▲	0.708 ▲	Andrew Muir and family	Australia	The Good Guys	n/a	not listed
110 ▲	0.706 ▲	Travers Duncan	Australia	Resources; property		0.670
111 ▲	0.704 ▲	Jack Bendat AM	Australia	Property		0.701
112 ▲	0.702 ▲	Bruce Gordon	Australia	Media	107 ▼	0.629 ▼
113 ▲	0.702 ▼	Bruno Grollo and family	Australia	Grocon; property		0.720
114 ▲	0.689 ▲	Mark Creasy	Australia	Resources		0.610
115 ▲	0.689 ▼	Mick Power	Australia	Construction		0.902
116 ▲	0.684 ▲	David Greiner and Ben Richardson	Australia	Technology		0.593
117	no data available					
118 ▲	0.680 ▲	Chris Mackay	Australia	Financial services		0.560
119 ▲	0.676 ▲	Andrew and Michael Buxton	Australia	Property		0.579
120	no data available					
121 ▲	0.673 ▲	Paul Fudge	Australia	Media		0.663
122 ▲	0.762 ▲	Bruce Neill	Australia	Financial services		0.472
123 ▲	0.667 ▼	Jonathan Hallinan	Australia	Property		0.490
124 ▲	0.660 ▲	Max Beck	Australia	Property		0.562
125 ▲	0.660 ▼	Harry Stamoulis and family	Australia	Manufacturing		0.646
126 ▲	0.657 ▲	Kim McKendrick and family	Australia	Ex-Godfrey Hirst Carpets		0.582
127 ▲	0.655 ▲	Frank Costa AO and family	Australia	Agriculture		0.538
128 ▲	0.654 ▲	Kerry Harmanis	Australia	Resources		0.640
129 ▲	0.651 ▲	Greg Poche	Australia	Ex-StarTrack		0.638
130 ▲	0.646 ▲	Trevor Lee	Australia	Agriculture		0.407
131 ▲	0.638 ▲	Terry Peabody	Australia	Ex-Transpacific; investment		0.587
132 ▲	0.631 ▲	Zig Inge and family	Australia	Property		0.611
133 ▼	0.625 ▲	Naomi Milgrom AO	Australia	Sussan; Sportsgirl; Suzanne Grae	117	0.585
134 ▲	0.621 ▼	John Symond AM	Australia	Ex-Aussie Home Loans		0.673
135 ▲	0.617 ▲	Hamish Douglass	Australia	Financial services		0.531
136 ▲	0.611 ▲	Nick DiMauro	Australia	Property		0.530
137 ▲	0.594 ▲	Marcus Blackmore	Australia	Blackmores; healthcare		0.529
138 ▲	0.589 ▲	Leon Kamenev	Australia	Ex-Menulog; technology		0.558
139 ▲	0.588 ▲	Christina and Tony Quinn	Australia	Darrell Lea; retail		0.465
140	no data available					
141 ▲	0.586 ▲	Jamie Pherous	Australia	Travel services		0.432
142 ▲	0.580 ▲	Danny Hill	Australia	Property		0.447
143 ▲	0.580 ▲	Tim Kentley-Klay	Australia	Technology		0.470
144 ▲	0.574 ▼	Tim Gurner	Australia	Property		0.473
145 ▲	0.569 ▲	Tony Tartak and family	Australia	Services		0.407
146 ▲	0.566 ▲	Bill Roche and Imelda Roche AO	Australia	Retail		0.504
147	no data available					
148 ▲	0.561 ▲	Gordon Martin	Australia	Manufacturing		0.484
149 ▲	0.560 ▲	Graham Tuckwell	Australia	Financial services		0.462
150 ▲	0.559 ▲	Grahame Mapp	Australia	Investment		0.423
151 ▲	0.555 ▲	Steven Kalmin	Australia	Glencore		0.454
152 ▲	0.553 ▲	Paul Blackburne	Australia	Property		0.530
153 ▲	0.549 ▼	Andrew Abercrombie	Australia	Financial services		0.574
154 ▲	0.549 ▲	John Higgins	Australia	Investment; services		0.484
155 ▲	0.546 ▼	Nigel Satterley	Australia	Satterley; property		0.551
156 ▲	0.536 ▲	Robert Whyte	Australia	Investment		0.446
157 ▲	0.535 ▼	George Kepper	Australia	Technology; property		0.563
158 ▲	0.534 ▲	Diana and Rino Grollo	Australia	Property		0.493
159	no data available					
160 ▲	0.534 ▲	Kevin Maloney	Australia	Mining services		0.499
161 ▲	0.534 ▲	John Singleton	Australia	Media; investment; property		0.450
162 ▲	0.529 ▲	Tony Poli	Australia	Resources; property		0.482
163 ▲	0.527 ▲	Hilton Nathanson	Australia	Financial services		0.451
164 ▲	0.527 ▼	Will Vicars	Australia	Financial services	n/a	not listed
165 ▲	0.519 ▲	David Paradice	Australia	Financial services		0.479
166 ▲	0.519 ▼	Ian Roberts	Australia	Healthcare		0.557
167 ▲	0.519 ▲	Tony Wales	Australia	Ex-Computershare; investment		0.483
168 ▲	0.513 ▲	Robert Magid	Australia	Property		0.499
169 ▲	0.511 ▲	Michael Boyd	Australia	Sonic Healthcare		0.488
170 ▲	0.506 ▲	Arthur Laundy	Australia	Hotels		0.412
171 ▲	0.506 ▲	Yenda Lee and family	Australia	Bing Lee; retail		0.482
172 ▲	0.503 ▲	Seumas Dawes	Australia	Financial services		0.412
173 ▲	0.499 ▼	Peter Cooper	Australia	Financial services		0.507
174 ▲	0.498 ▲	Jan Cameron CNZM	Australia	Ex-Kathmandu; retail	n/a	not listed
175 ▲	0.491 ▲	Peter Hughes and family	Australia	Agriculture		0.391
176 ▲	0.487 ▲	Gerry Ryan OAM	Australia	Jayco; manufacturing		0.473
177 ▲	0.486 ▲	Greg Coffey	Australia	Financial services		0.482
178 ▲	0.483 ▼	Evan Acton and family	Australia	Rural		0.490
179 ▲	0.475 ▲	Dick Honan	Australia	Manildra Group		0.440
180 ▲	0.472 ▲	Trevor St Baker	Australia	Energy	n/a	not listed
181 ▲	0.468 ▲	Tony Haggarty	Australia	Resources		0.462
182 ▲	0.459 ▲	Owen Kerr	Australia	Financial services		0.342
183 ▲	0.457 ▼	Bryan Dorman	Australia	Technology		0.520
184 ▲	0.453 ▼	John and Robert Kirby	Australia	Village Roadshow; entertainment		0.454
185	no data available					
186 ▲	0.450 ▲	Rod Jones	Australia	Navitas Group		0.403
187 ▲	0.449 ▼	Bob Rose	Australia	Property		0.454
188 ▲	0.432 ▼	Laurie Sutton	Australia	Retail		0.453
189 ▲	0.428 ▼	John Simpson	Australia	Property		0.614
190 ▲	0.415 ▲	Doug Shears	Australia	Rural		0.413
191 ▲	0.413 ▲	Ori Allon	Australia	Technology		0.364
192 ▲	0.411 ▼	Alf Moufarrige	Australia	Servcorp; property		0.467
193 ▲	0.409 ▲	Bob Sharpless	Australia	Property	n/a	not listed
194 ▲	0.407 ▼	Patricia Ilhan	Australia	Crazy John's		0.404
195 ▲	0.405 ▲	Tony Denny	Australia	Retail		0.355
196 ▲	0.404 ▲	John Kinghorn	Australia	Investment		0.353
197 ▲	0.401 ▲	Alan Tribe	Australia	Retail		0.375
198 ▲	0.399 ▼	Barry Lambert	Australia	Financial services		0.437
199 ▲	0.395 ▲	Ruslan Kogan	Australia	Kogan.com; retail	n/a	not listed
200 ▲	0.387 ▲	Radek Sali	Australia	Ex-Swisse		0.372

Legend
Icon	Description
Steady	Has not changed from the previous year's list
▲	Has increased from the previous year's list
▼	Has decreased from the previous year's list

== See also ==
- Financial Review Rich List
- Forbes Asia list of Australians by net worth
