= Jeff Harris =

Jeff Harris may refer to:

- Jeff Harris (baseball) (born 1974), American baseball player
- Jeff Harris (footballer) (1931–2023), Australian rules footballer
- Jeff Harris (politician) (born 1964), Member of the Missouri House of Representatives
- Jeff Harris (writer) (1935–2004), American television actor, producer and writer, co-creator of Diff'rent Strokes
- Jeff Harris, creator of the comic strip Shortcuts

== See also ==
- Jeffrey Harris (disambiguation)
- Geoff Harris, Australian businessman
- Geoffrey Harris (disambiguation)
