= Jeffrey Harris =

Jeffrey Harris may refer to:

- Jeffrey Harris (artist) (born 1949), New Zealand artist
- Jeffrey E. Harris, American physician and economist
- Jeffrey K. Harris (born 1953), American director of the National Reconnaissance Office

== See also ==
- Geoffrey Harris (disambiguation)
- Jeff Harris (disambiguation)
