= Bingo Industries =

Australian waste management company founded by Tartak family in 2005

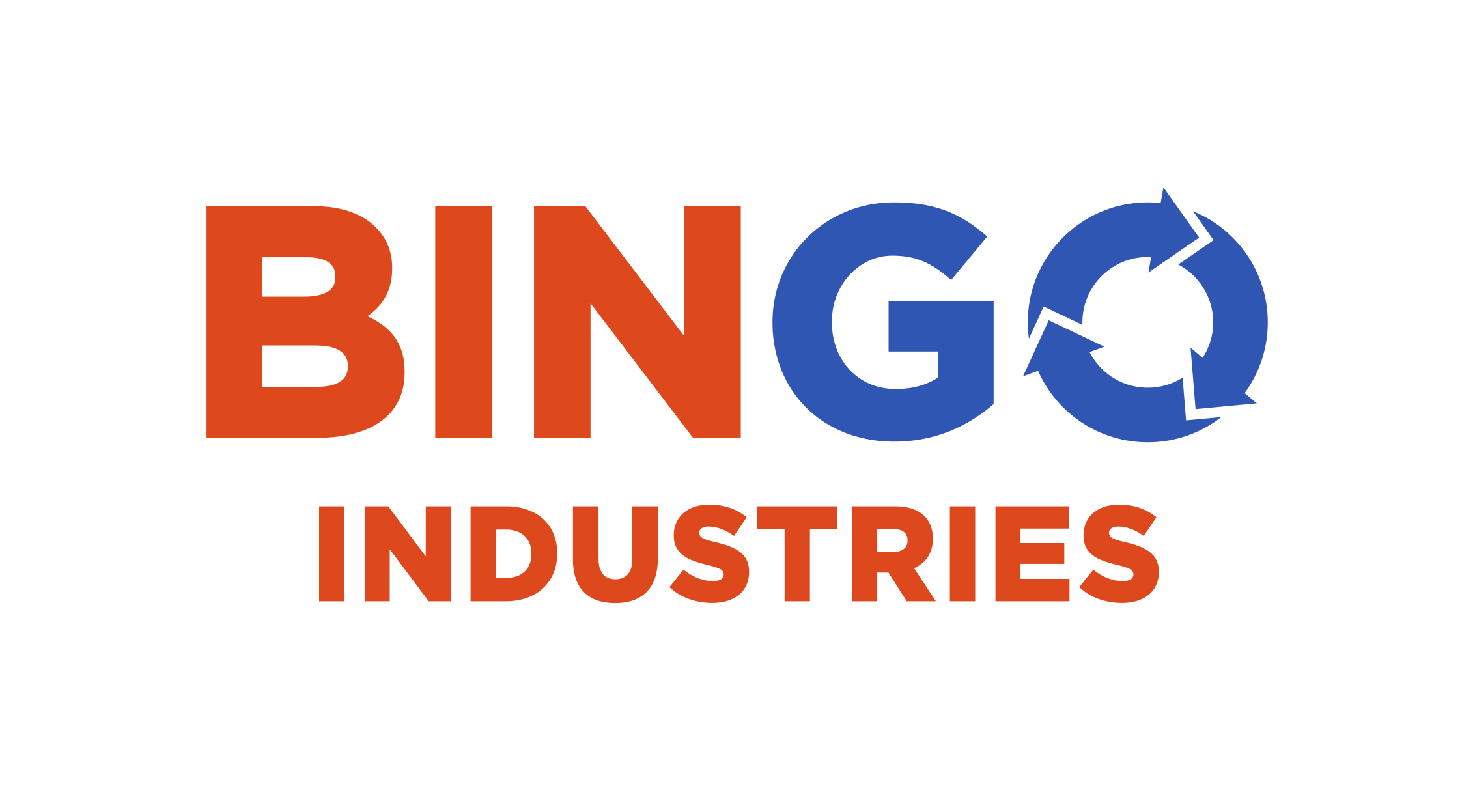
- Type: Subsidiary
- Industry: Waste management
- Founded: 2005; 21 years ago
- Founder: Tartak family
- Headquarters: Sydney and Melbourne, Australia
- Key people: Daniel Tartak (CEO)
- Parent: Macquarie Group
- Website: bingoindustries.com.au

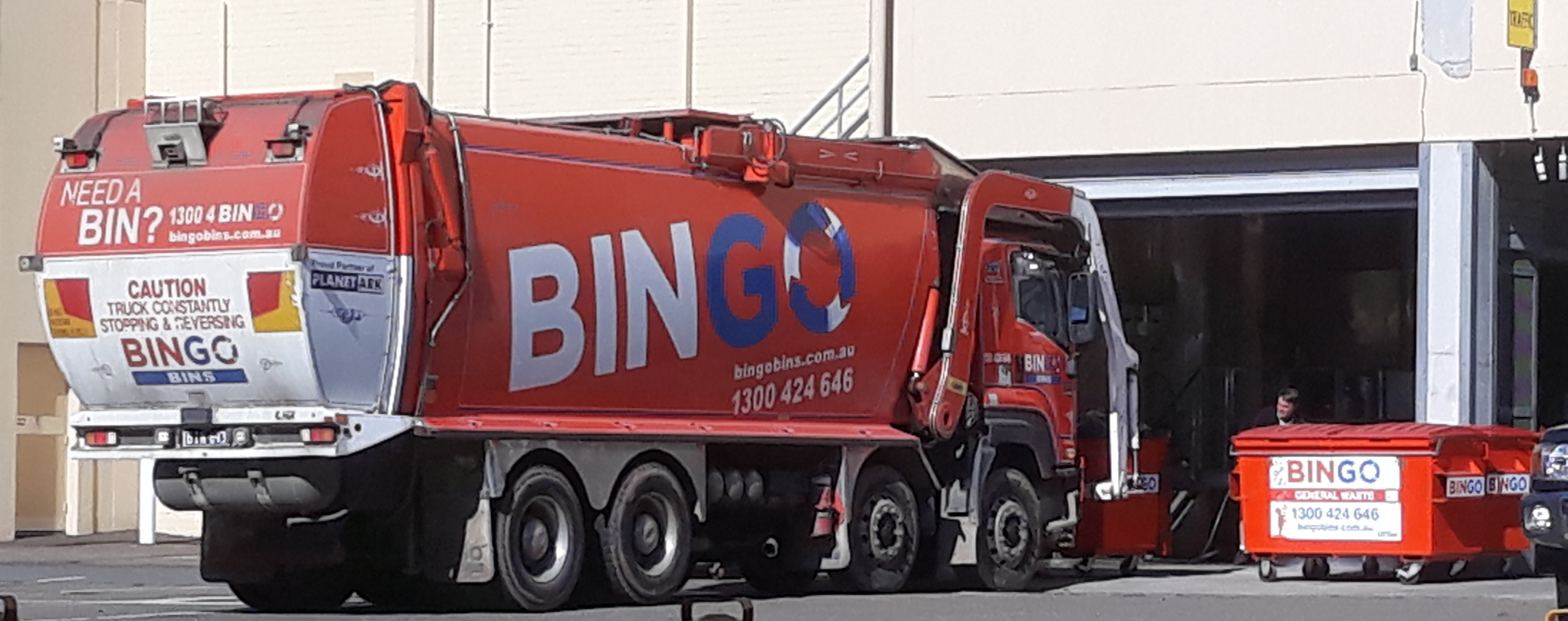
A Bingo Industries vehicle and skip bin

Bingo Industries is an Australian waste management and recycling company founded by the Tartak family in 2005. Its origins were formed when Tony Tartak purchased a small skip bin company.

== Overview ==
With Headquarters in Sydney, Australia and network across Melbourne, Australia the Company operates residential and commercial waste services, recycling services and bin manufacturing through subsidiary company TORO Waste Equipment

The company was floated on the Australian Securities Exchange in 2017, becoming a public company with a launch share price of $1.85, earning its founders around $452 million whilst retaining a 30 percent stake. Prior to its float, it held a 24 percent share in the building and demolition waste market.

== Acquisitions ==
In 2018, Bingo Industries acquired Dial A Dump for $578 million. The transaction was approved by the Australian Competition & Consumer Commission in February 2019. In April 2021, Bingo Industries was purchased for $2.3 billion by Macquarie Group.

On the 1st July 2022, Bingo Industries announced the acquisition of United Waste Services, a Brisbane-based waste and recycling company with a fleet of 37 vehicles servicing over 3,500 skip and hook bins across the southeast region of Queensland (Brisbane and the Gold Coast).

In October 2022 the former CEO of Bingo Industries, Daniel Tartak, pleaded guilty to criminal cartel offences over price fixing in Sydney in 2019.
