= Kayla Itsines =

Australian personal trainer, writer and entrepreneur

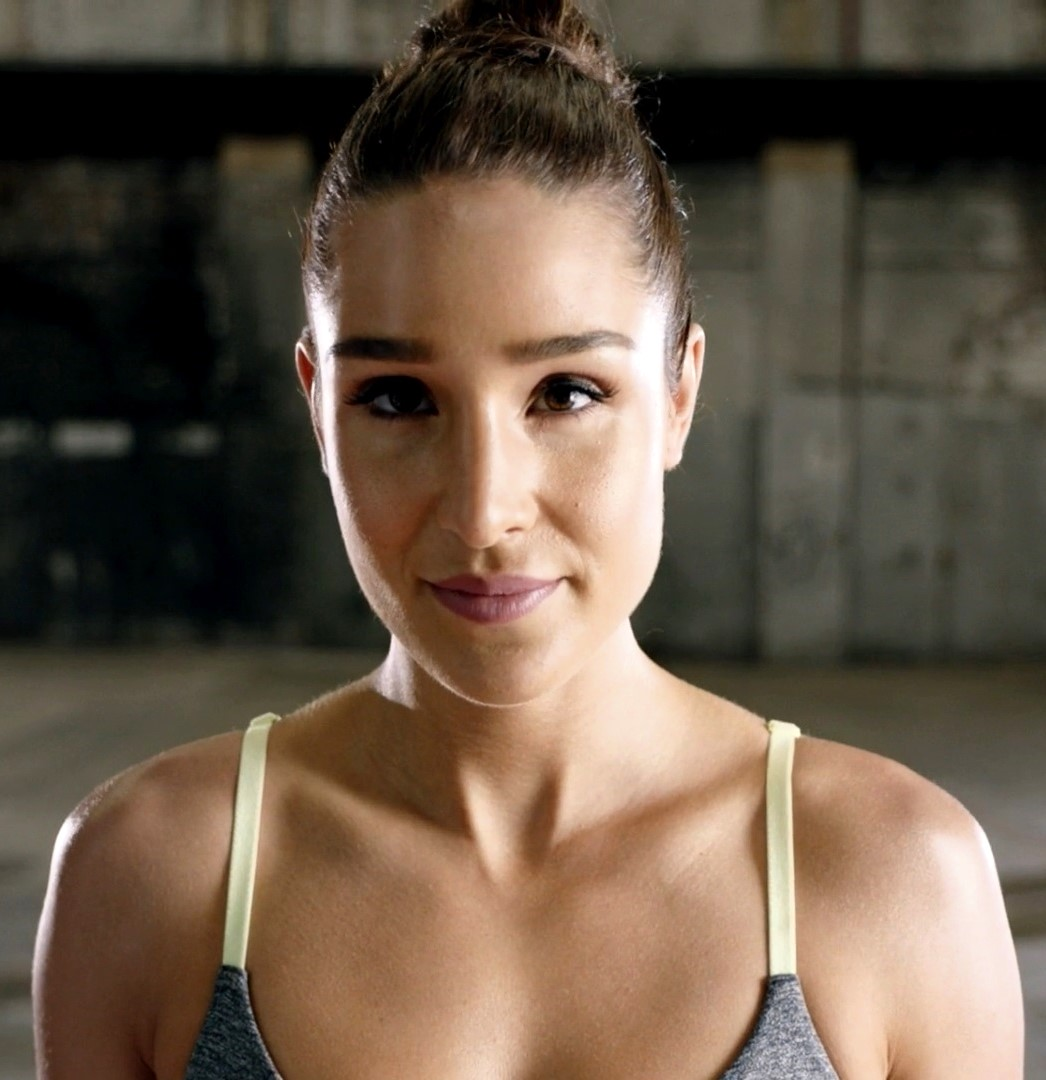
- Itsines in 2017
- Born: 21 May 1991 (age 35); Adelaide, South Australia, Australia
- Occupations: Personal trainer, author, entrepreneur, influencer
- Spouse: Jae Woodroffe (m. 2023)
- Children: 2
- Website: kaylaitsines.com

Kayla Itsines (/ɪtˈsiːnəs/ it-SEE-nəs; born 21 May 1991) is an Australian personal trainer, author and entrepreneur. She is the co-creator of a series of fitness ebooks titled Bikini Body Guides, and a meal-planning and workout app, Sweat with Kayla. In 2016, Sweat with Kayla generated more revenue than any other fitness app.

In March 2016, Time named Itsines one of the 30 most influential people on the Internet, noting her success at leveraging social media to promote her brand. As of October 2016, Itsines had eight million followers on Facebook and 12.5 million on Instagram.

== Early life ==
Itsines traces her interest in fitness to playing basketball and other sports. She recalls being initially intimidated and overwhelmed by the gym, until a personal trainer encouraged her to "just start somewhere". Finding that she enjoyed how the workouts made her feel, she abandoned her original plans to become a beauty therapist graduating from the Australian Institute of Fitness at the age of 18 as a Master Trainer.

== Career ==
Itsines found work at a women's gym in Adelaide. Itsines came to believe that most women seek three specific outcomes from training: smaller inner thighs, flatter abdomens, and more toned arms, while also being concerned about becoming too bulky.

She also started training her sister's friends who wanted to improve their fitness so they could play Netball on their high school team, focusing on building core strength and powerful legs. She lectured them on nutrition, and asked them to take before-and-after photos of themselves to track their progress. Itsines' 12-year-old cousin suggested using Instagram as a way of organising the photos. Within a few months, Itsines gained thousands of followers and was receiving regular requests for advice and help. Her ex-fiancé Tobi Pearce, suggested that she compile her routines into ebooks that could be sold online. In March 2013, they founded the Bikini Body Training company with Itsines as director and Pearce as CEO. The following January, they published the first two Bikini Body Guides, with Itsines' workouts in one volume, and nutrition information from dieticians Julie Dundon and Anne Schneyder of Nutrition Professionals Australia in another. Itsines would later offer the guides via an affiliate program as well. By October, the guides had been downloaded over one million times.

The BBG program is based on 28-minute high-intensity workouts to be completed three times per week. The workouts are built from a repertoire of 150 movements inspired by a variety of sports and other physical training. The meal plans originally provided as little as 1,200 calories per day, but were updated to provide 1,600 to 1,800. She describes the overall strategy as not being aimed at either weight loss or muscle gain, but rather, the creation of a particular look. The program is aimed primarily at women because Itsines feels she particularly understands women's health and fitness goals.

In 2015, she embarked on a world tour, the "Kayla Itsines Bootcamp World Tour", leading free group fitness classes. The tour included Australia's capital cities, New York City, Los Angeles, and London.

In February 2015, Itsines took legal action against another Adelaide-based personal trainer, Leanne Ratcliffe, and Ratcliffe's partner Harley Johnstone over comments they had posted on their YouTube channels. Ratcliffe, publishing under the pseudonym "Freelee the Banana Girl", had claimed that the BBG eating plan required users to starve themselves, and Johnstone, publishing as "Durianrider", claimed that Pearce used steroids. Itsines claimed the statements were defamatory. She obtained an injunction to prevent the further publication of the videos. When the complaint was heard in the Supreme Court of South Australia on 23 March, Judge Withers directed the case proceed to trial, but the matter was eventually settled out of court.

In April 2015, Apple featured Itsines in an advertisement for the Apple Watch, demonstrating the heart-rate monitor feature of the product.

In November 2016, Pan Macmillan published Itsines' first print book, The Bikini Body 28-Day Eating and Lifestyle Guide. In August 2017, she announced the upcoming publication of her second book, The Bikini Body Motivation & Habits Guide.

Itsines credits her social media success to keeping the focus on her followers and their fitness journeys rather than on herself and her journey. Part of her social media strategy is to keep attention on the transformation of the body, and she therefore seldom posts photos of her face. She is also careful of how she is represented visually by other publications, turning down photo shoots that she finds inconsistent with her image. In a statement of her own values, she says she would never promote something in which she personally does not believe, pose provocatively or sexualise herself, or post advice that is relevant only to her own lifestyle. She is the only person who posts on her social media accounts.

From 2018, her wealth was observed as $63 million.

== Personal life ==
Itsines is the daughter of Anna and Jim Itsines, both teachers. She has one younger sister, Leah, who is a personal trainer and food stylist. Itsines' family heritage is "traditional" Greek Orthodox Christian, and she identifies herself as Greek. She credits many of her food choices to her Greek upbringing.

Itsines met her ex-fiancé, Tobi Pearce, at a gym in 2012. In April 2018, they got engaged and she gave birth to their daughter in April 2019. Kayla and Tobi announced their split in August 2020.

In July 2022, Itsines announced her engagement to her current partner Jae Woodroffe, whom she had been dating since 2021. This was shortly followed by the announcement of her second pregnancy. She gave birth to their son in January 2023 and married Woodroffe in December 2023. In March 2026, Itsines and her husband purchased a $13 million waterfront mansion in Mermaid Waters, Queensland. The property includes luxury amenities.

=== Net worth ===
In October 2016, Itsines and her then partner, Tobi Pearce, were included in the BRW "Young Rich" list of the wealthiest Australians aged under 40 who had not inherited their money. Their net worth was reported at A$46 million in 2016. Itsines and Pearce's net worth was estimated as A$486 million on the Financial Review 2019 Rich List. Itsines' net worth did not meet the A$472 million cut-off for the Financial Review 2020 Rich List.
