= Geoffrey Harris =

Geoffrey Harris may refer to:

- Geoffrey Harris (runner), Canadian middle-distance runner
- Geoffrey Harris (neuroendocrinologist), British physiologist and neuroendocrinologist
- Geoff Harris, Australian businessman and philanthropist

== See also ==
- Jeffrey Harris (disambiguation)
