= Pauline Gandel =

Australian business woman and philanthropist

Pauline Gandel AC is known as the "matriarch" of the billionaire Gandel family, who own a number of shopping centres. She began her charity work by running an op shop at Chadstone Shopping Centre for Jewish Museum of Australia and Vision Australia for over a decade, and co-founded Gandel Philanthropy with her husband in 1978. The Australian described her as "a fixture of Melbourne's charity landscape".

The Pauline Gandel Children's Gallery at the Melbourne Museum, the Pauline Gandel Women's Imaging Centre at the Royal Women's Hospital and the Pauline Gandel Scholarship at Monash University are named for her. The gallery was funded with a $1 million donation from Gandel personally, the largest donation from an individual in Museum Victoria's history.

She was made a Companion of the Order of Australia, the highest possible Australian honour, in January 2019, for "eminent service to the community through humanitarian, philanthropic and fundraising endeavours, to social inclusion, and to Australia-Japan relations". She had previously been awarded Japan's Order of the Rising Sun, Gold Rays with Rosette, in 2014, for her efforts to promote "mutual understanding of Japanese culture in Australia through Japanese art and tea ceremony".
