= Don McDonald =

American football player (born 1937)

No. 42
- Position: Defensive back

Personal information
- Born: February 5, 1937 (age 89); Sherman, Texas, U.S.
- Listed height: 5 ft 11 in (1.80 m)
- Listed weight: 185 lb (84 kg)

Career information
- High school: Sherman
- College: Houston (1957–1959)
- NFL draft: 1958: 29th round, 340th overall pick

Career history
- Philadelphia Eagles (1961)*; Buffalo Bills (1961)
- * Offseason or practice squad member only
- Stats at Pro Football Reference

Don Kay McDonald (born February 5, 1937) is an American former professional football defensive back who played for the Buffalo Bills of the American Football League (AFL). He played college football for the Houston Cougars as a quarterback and was selected by the Philadelphia Eagles in the 29th round of the 1958 NFL draft.

== Early life ==
Don Kay McDonald was born on February 5, 1937, in Sherman, Texas. He attended Sherman High School.

== College career ==
McDonald first enrolled at Texas Christian University to play college football for the Horned Frogs but did not end up playing there. He transferred to the University of Houston, where he was a part-time starting quarterback and three-year letterman for the Cougars from 1957 to 1959. In March 1957, he was dismissed from the team for disciplinary reasons but returned later in the season. McDonald finished his college career with 65 completions on 134 passing attempts (48.5%) for 778 yards, two touchdowns, 15 interceptions, and four rushing touchdowns.

== Professional career ==
McDonald was selected by the Philadelphia Eagles in the 29th round, with the 340th overall pick, of the 1958 NFL draft. He signed with the Eagles on April 24, 1961. He was waived on August 21, 1961.

McDonald was signed to the taxi squad of the Buffalo Bills of the American Football League. He was promoted to the active roster on September 26, 1961, and played in the remaining 11 games of the 1961 season, starting five of them. He was listed as a safety/cornerback. McDonald finished the year with two fumble recoveries for 24 yards and one touchdown. He was waived on April 9, 1962.
