= John Gandel =

Australian businessman

John Gandel AC
- Born: Aaron Jonna Gandel; 1935 (age 90–91); Australia
- Education: Melbourne High School
- Occupation: Property developer
- Spouse: Pauline Gandel AC
- Children: 4
- Parent(s): Sam and Fay Gandel
- Relatives: Marc Besen (brother-in-law; 1923–2023); Naomi Milgrom (niece); Carol Schwarts (niece)

John Gandel AC (born 1935 as Aaron Jonna Gandel) is an Australian businessman, property developer and philanthropist. He made his fortune in the development of commercial real estate as well as shopping centres located in Melbourne, Victoria.

Gandel inherited much of his wealth from his Polish-immigrant parents, founders of the Sussan women's clothing chain.

== Early life and education ==
Gandel was born in Australia in 1935, the son of Sam and Fay Gandel, both were Polish-Jewish émigrés. Both fled from Poland after the Soviets invaded. His parents operated a corsetry store on Collins Street, Melbourne. Gandel was educated at Melbourne High School. He has one sister, Eva Gandel Besen.

== Career ==
In the 1950s, Gandel took control of his parents' women's clothing business (then named Sussan) and with his brother-in-law Marc Besen grew it into a chain of over 200 stores. In 1983, he bought the Chadstone Shopping Centre, selling Sussan to his brother-in-law in 1985 to concentrate on real estate. He subsequently built his fortune in shopping centres.

In July 1983, Myer sold the Chadstone Shopping Centre to the Gandel Group for $37 million, which has since managed and developed the complex into Australia's biggest shopping mall which is now valued at over A$3 billion. In July 1983, Myer also sold the Northland Shopping Centre to the Gandel Group. Gandel's major assets are 50 per cent shares in Chadstone, and a 17 per cent stake in the listed Vicinity Centres that owns the other half. Gandel also owns significant stakes in listed property companies, besides the stake in Vicinity, worth about A$800 million, and a 15 per cent stake in Sydney-based property group, Charter Hall, in which he invested A$151 million.

According to a January 2012 Herald Sun report, Gandel was the wealthiest man in Melbourne, with an estimated A$3.4 billion net worth. In 2012 Gandel sold his stake in the Northland Shopping Centre for A$455 million and announced an A$500 million hotel and office redevelopment at Chadstone in 2011. In 2006, Gandel bought a 50% stake in Plastro Irrigation Systems, an Israeli irrigation company. In May 2007, the majority owners of the company exercised a right they held and bought back these holdings.

== Personal life ==
Gandel is married to Pauline, who in 2019, was appointed a Companion of the Order of Australia for her work for the community, in humanitarian, philanthropic and fundraising endeavours, and in social inclusion, as well as in building closer relations between Australia and Japan. Together they have had four children. John and Pauline Gandel live in Toorak, Melbourne.

=== Net worth ===
As of May 2025, Gandel's net worth was assessed by the Australian Financial Review A$7.21 billion as published in the 2025 Rich List. Gandel is one of seven living individuals listed on every Financial Review Rich List since the first list was published in 1984, as the BRW Rich 100.

In 2019, Gandel ranked eighth by Forbes magazine, with an assessed net worth of US$4.00 billion.

Year	Financial Review Rich List		Forbes Australia's 50 richest	
Year	Rank	Net worth A$ bn	Rank	Net worth US$ bn
2010			5 ▼	$2.40 billion ▲
2011	9 ▼	$3.45 billion ▲	6 ▼	$3.30 billion ▲
2012	10 ▼	$3.35 billion ▼	8 ▼	$3.20 billion ▼
2013	8 ▲	$3.70 billion ▲	8	$3.50 billion ▲
2014	9 ▼	$4.08 billion ▲	8	$3.20 billion ▼
2015	8 ▲	$4.40 billion ▲	6 ▲	$3.60 billion ▲
2016	5 ▲	$5.40 billion ▲	7 ▼	$3.20 billion ▼
2017	7 ▼	$6.05 billion ▲		
2018	7	$6.45 billion ▲		
2019	10 ▼	$6.60 billion ▲	8 ▼	$4.00 billion ▼
2020	11 ▼	$5.45 billion ▼		
2021	14 ▼	$5.80 billion ▲		
2022	16 ▼	$6.20 billion ▲		
2023	15 ▲	$6.33 billion ▲		
2024	16 ▼	$6.94 billion ▲		
2025	20 ▼	$7.21 billion ▲		

Legend
Icon	Description
Steady	Has not changed from the previous year
▲	Has increased from the previous year
▼	Has decreased from the previous year

=== Philanthropy ===
Since 1978, Gandel and his wife, Pauline, have headed up Gandel Philanthropy, one of the largest philanthropic family funds in Australia. The foundation provides grants to charitable community organisations for Jewish and Australian causes. Gandel's philanthropy has focused on Judaism, education, medical causes and the arts. In 2010 he donated A$7.5 million to the National Gallery of Australia; A$1 million to fight devastating bushfires in Victoria, recalling how their own home was destroyed by fire twenty years earlier, and A$1 million to Museums Victoria. In May 2006, Gandel was awarded an honorary doctorate of philosophy from Tel Aviv University, the university's highest honor, for his "business standing, broad leadership roles and philanthropic support in Australia and Israel." In the same month Gandel inaugurated the Gandel Institute for Adult Jewish Learning at the Hebrew University of Jerusalem.

In 1990, Gandel was appointed an Officer of the Order of Australia in recognition of his service to business, commerce and to the community. In 2017, he was appointed a Companion of the Order for his eminent service to the community as a benefactor and supporter of a range of visual arts and cultural institutions, to youth education, medical and biotechnology innovation programs, to business, and to the advancement of philanthropic giving.
