= Naomi Milgrom =

Australian businesswoman (born 1952)

Naomi Milgrom AC
- Born: Naomi Besen; 1952 (age 73–74); Melbourne, Victoria, Australia
- Education: Mount Scopus Memorial College; Firbank Girls' Grammar School
- Alma mater: Monash University; University of New South Wales
- Occupations: Businesswoman; Philanthropist; Cultural leader
- Known for: Sportsgirl, Sussan and Suzanne Grae
- Spouses: Alfred Milgrom (div.); John Kaldor (div.)
- Parents: Marc Besen (father); Eva Besen (mother)
- Relatives: Carol Schwartz (sister); Debbie Dadon (sister); Daniel Besen (brother)
- Awards: Companion of the Order of Australia (AC) (2020); Officer of the Order of Australia (AO) (2010); Centenary Medal (2001); Sir John Monash Award for Outstanding Achievement (2010); Ernst & Young Champion of Entrepreneurship Award (2009); Distinguished Alumni Lifetime Achievement Award, Monash University (2010); Australian Retailers Association Australian Retail Awards Hall of Fame Inductee (2016); Melbourne Achiever Award (2017); Ethical Leadership Award, John Monash Foundation (2018); Creative Partnerships Australia Philanthropy Leadership Award (2019); Melbourne Design Week Award (2020); Honorary Fellow Design Institute of Australia (2020); Australian Institute of Architects’ President’s Prize (2024)

Naomi Milgrom AC (née Besen; born 1952) is an Australian billionaire businesswoman, philanthropist and cultural leader. Her private company ARJ Group Holdings owns women's clothing retailers Sportsgirl, Sussan and Suzanne Grae.

== Early life and education ==
Milgrom was born in Melbourne, one of four children born to art collectors and retailing magnates Marc and Eva Besen. Her maternal grandmother Fay Gandel, a Polish-Jewish seamstress opened a small lingerie store in 1939. Her father, a Romanian-Jewish refugee from Romania, arrived in Australia in 1947 at the age of 23. She is the niece of billionaire property developer John Gandel.

Milgrom grew up in the Melbourne suburb of St Kilda. She attended Mount Scopus Memorial College and Firbank Girls' Grammar School. She later studied languages at Monash University and completed a Diploma of Education at the University of New South Wales.

== Career ==
She worked for four years as a special education teacher in Sydney, helping autistic and schizophrenic children. She then worked in publishing and advertising.

In 1977, Milgrom and her first husband Alfred Milgrom established Melbourne House (Publishers) Ltd, a publishing company with offices in Melbourne and London. They published a series of books on computers and in 1980 co-founded video game studio BEAM Software (later Krome Studios Melbourne).

Milgrom joined the family business Sussan in 1988 as marketing and strategic planning manager, after her father bought out his brother-in-law John Gandel. She was appointed merchandise director the following year and, in 1990, became chief executive. Milgrom spearheaded the acquisition of Suzanne Grae in 1991 and the acquisition of Sportsgirl in 1999. In 2003, Milgrom bought her parents and three siblings out of the business and assumed full ownership of all three brands.

== Personal life ==
Milgrom has three children from her first marriage to Alfred Milgrom. As of 2014 she lived in the Melbourne suburb of Middle Park. It was reported that Milgrom owns properties in Bondi Beach and Byron Bay.

=== Net worth ===
In 2018, according to the UK Financial Times, Milgrom was the eighth-richest woman in Australia, with an estimated net worth of over A$500 million. As of May 2025, the Australian Financial Review assessed her net worth as A$1.72 billion in the 2025 Rich List.

| Year | Financial Review Rich List | | Forbes Australia's 50 Richest | |
| Year | Rank | Net worth (A$) | Rank | Net worth (US$) |
|---|---|---|---|---|
| 2006 | | $495 million | | |
| 2007 | | | | |
| 2008 | | | | |
| 2009 | | | | |
| 2010 | | | | |
| 2011 | | | | |
| 2012 | | | | |
| 2013 | | | | |
| 2014 | | | | |
| 2015 | | | | |
| 2016 | 108 | $582 million | | |
| 2017 | 117 ▼ | $585 million ▲ | | |
| 2018 | 133 ▼ | $625 million ▲ | | |
| 2019 | 121 ▲ | $781 million ▲ | | |
| 2020 | 125 ▼ | $795 million ▲ | | |
| 2021 | 115 ▲ | $933 million ▲ | | |
| 2022 | 118 ▼ | $1.20 billion ▲ | | |
| 2023 | 124 ▼ | $1.15 billion ▼ | | |
| 2024 | | $1.60 billion ▲ | | |
| 2025 | 98 | $1.72 billion ▲ | | |

Legend
| Icon | Description |
|---|---|
| Steady | Has not changed from the previous year |
| ▲ | Has increased from the previous year |
| ▼ | Has decreased from the previous year |

=== Philanthropy ===
Milgrom is an active benefactor and participant in arts projects and events. In 2014 she established the Naomi Milgrom Foundation to fund public art, design and architecture projects. The same year, the foundation provided the funding for a series of outdoor pavilions (known as MPavilions) to be built in Queen Victoria Gardens, Melbourne. Since 2014, the Naomi Milgrom Foundation has invited international architects to design an MPavilion each year. Architects have included Sean Godsell (2014), Amanda Levete (2016), Bijoy Jain (2017), Glenn Murcutt (2019) and Tadao Andao (2023). Tadao Ando's MPavilion will remain in Melbourne's Queen Victoria Gardens until June 2025, after City of Melbourne approved a request from the Naomi Milgrom Foundation to extend the temporary structure. MPavilion has received the Australian Institute of Architects Presidents’ Prize (2015), the Melbourne Award (2016), Victorian Architecture Awards (2015), (2016), (2017); National Trust Heritage Awards (2017) and the Good Design Award (2018). In 2024, Milgrom received the Australian Institute of Architects’ National President’s Prize for her contributions to architecture through the Pavilion project.

Milgrom's other philanthropic projects cover entrepreneurship, contemporary art, music, dance, fashion, culture, science, education, women's health and the Jewish community. Major cultural projects instigated by the Naomi Milgrom Foundation include the Living Cities Forum, Patricia Piccinini ‘Sky Whales’, 2020–2021; Photo 2021, Photo 2024; and William Kentridge projects I am not me, the Horse is not mine (2018–2019) and That Which We Do Not Remember (2019). In 2017, Milgrom announced plans to redevelop parts of Cremorne, Melbourne to create a precinct to support Melbourne's technology, media and creative industries.

Milgrom has been Chair of the Australian Centre for Contemporary Art, Chair of the Melbourne Fashion Festival, Director of the Magellan Financial Group and a board member of the Florey Institute of Neuroscience and Mental Health. She has also held the position of board member of the Melbourne Business School and served as Commissioner for the Australian representation at the 57th International Art Exhibition, Venice Biennale 2017 and Jury Chair of the international design competition for the Powerhouse Precinct in Parramatta. Other roles Milgrom has held include board member, Agenda Victoria; National Councillor, Australian Retailers Association; Advisory Council Member, Centre for Social Impact; Inaugural board member, Family Business Council; Trustee, the Jewish Museum of Australia; chair, The Katherine Hannay Visual Arts Commission for ANZ Trustees; Trustee, National Gallery of Victoria; and the Premier of Victoria’s Bushfire Reconstruction Industry Champions Committee. Milgrom is a member of the Art Basel Global Patrons Council, Tate Museum London's International Council and has been a judge for the World Architecture Awards.

=== Awards ===
In 2001, Milgrom was awarded the Centenary Medal for outstanding service to the Melbourne Fashion Festival and the fashion industry. In 2010, Milgrom was appointed an Officer of the Order of Australia (AO) for service to business as a leader and mentor in the fashion industry, and to the community through advisory and management roles of a wide range of arts, health and philanthropic bodies; and in 2020, Milgrom was appointed a Companion of the Order of Australia (AC) for eminent service to the community through philanthropic leadership and support for the promotion of the arts, architecture, design excellence and cultural exchange, and to business.

In 2015, she was awarded the Australian Institute of Architects President's Prize for her establishment of the MPavilion project in Melbourne. Milgrom also received an Honorary Doctorate of Business from RMIT University (2010), a Distinguished Alumni Lifetime Achievement Award from Monash University (2010), and the Creative Partnerships Australia Philanthropy Leadership Award (2016). In 2016, she was also inducted into the Australian Retailers Association's Australian Retail Awards Hall of Fame, and in 2017, she received the Melbourne Achiever Award.

In 2018, she was honored with the Ethical Leadership Award by the John Monash Foundation. Milgrom also received the Melbourne Design Week Award (2020) and was recognised as an Honorary Fellow of the Design Institute of Australia in the same year. In 2024, she was awarded the Australian Institute of Architects' President's Prize.

Milgrom has also received the Sir John Monash Award for Outstanding Achievement (2008), an Honorary Doctorate of Business from RMIT University (2010), a Distinguished Alumni Lifetime Achievement Award from Monash University (2010), Creative Partnerships Australia Philanthropy Leadership Award (2016_ and an Honorary Doctorate of Business from the University of New South Wales (2016).
