= Alan Messer =

British photographer

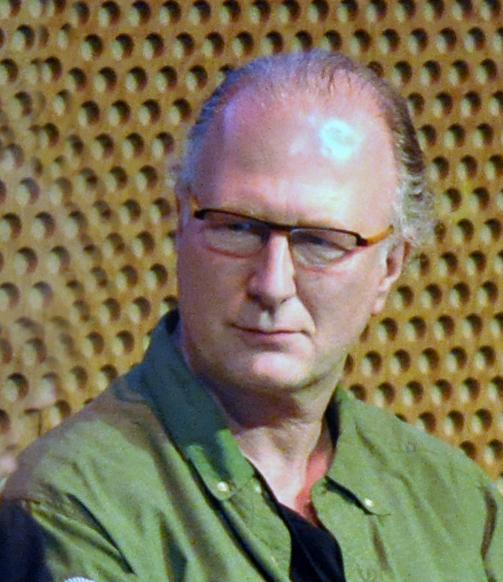
- Alan Messer in 2010
- Born: 1951 (age 74–75); United Kingdom
- Known for: Photographer

Alan Messer (born 1951) is a British photographer originally from Kent, known for his photographs of musicians. Messer bought his first camera in 1958, a Kodak Brownie 127; he wanted to document his family and the environment around the south east coast of England where he grew up. Messer met his future employer, when his father hired the then famous music photographer Dezo Hoffmann, to photograph boys' clothes that he made in his tailoring, Alan and his brothers were the models.

Messer did not like school, and in 1967 he got a job at Dezo Hoffmann's studio in London. One week later, he was an assistant in a photo shoot of Jimi Hendrix for a newspaper cover. Within a few weeks, he had a front page of Manfred Mann, who marketed their new single "Mighty Quinn", and then in 1968 The Beatles who posed for their film campaign for Yellow Submarine.

During the 1970s, Messer photographed many famous bands and artists in his studio in London. In 1978, he moved to Nashville and opened a studio, where he continues to photograph musicians, including Johnny Cash.

== Exhibitions ==
The Royal Albert Hall in London hosted the exhibition Keep It Country in 2024 celebrating five decades of iconic country music photography, offering a glimpse into Messer's vast catalogue documenting country music's most legendary eras and artists.

RETRO 50 is an exhibition on view until 2025 presented by This is Noteworthy and The Madnest, and includes iconic photo subjects spanning the photographer´s career such as John Lennon, George Harrison, Marc Bolan, Elton John, Keith Richards, Johnny Cash, David Bowie, Iggy Pop, James Brown, Stevie Ray Vaughan, The Rolling Stones, Leonard Cohen, Bob Marley, The Beatles, Diana Ross, and many more.

== Album cover photography ==
Messer has also photographed hundreds of album covers, including the following:

- American Vagabond - William Lee Golden (1986)
- Rhythm Oil - Terry Clarke, Michael Messer, Jesse Taylor (1993)
- Willie Nelson Super Hits - Willie Nelson (1994)
- A Night Of Reckoning - The Dead Reckoners (1997)
- Car Wheels On A Gravel Road - Lucinda Williams (1998)
- Press On - June Carter Cash (1999)
- Solos, Sessions and Encores - Stevie Ray Vaughan & Friends (2007)
- The Definitive Collection - Merle Haggard (2007)
- Sex & Gasoline - Rodney Crowell (2008)
- The Ice Queen - Sue Foley (2018)
- Come to Me - Sue Foley (2018)
- The Best of Johnny Cash. The Millennium Collection - Johnny Cash (2020)
- Nashville Tears - Rumer (2020)
- Johnny Cash Songwriter - Johnny Cash (2024)

He won a Grammy in 1988 for the O´Kanes Tired Of The Running album.

== Film ==
On January 16, 2024 Paramount+ launched the film JUNE from Emmy winner Kristen Vaurio, a documentary about June Carter Cash.

The film includes a collection of exclusive interviews with Cash´s family members and musicians, never-before-seen archival footage and lots of Messer´s photographs taken to the artist over two decades, loads of video footage from mainly the Press On recording sessions and time in Jamaica shooting the album cover.

The documentary made its world premiere in November 2023 at the DOC NYC Festival and later at Nashville’s Woolworth Theatre. Amongst the invitees to the latter included The Cash Family, Emmylou Harris, Larry Gatlin, or actress Jane Seymour.
