= Cyan Ta'eed =

Australian entrepreneur and businesswoman

Cyan Ta'eed is an Australian entrepreneur and businesswoman. She was one of the co-founders of Envato, a company that operates online marketplaces for digital assets. She also spearheaded the social enterprise Hey Tiger and the mobile website-building app Milkshake.

== Early life and education ==
Ta'eed was born in New York and raised in Sydney, Australia. Her father, John Marmaras was a corporate photographer and her mother was a swimwear designer. Ta'eed studied graphic design and worked as a freelance designer before moving into business.

== Career ==
In 2006, Ta'eed co-founded Envato with her husband, Collis Ta’eed, and Jun Rung out of a home office. In May 2024, Envato was sold to Shutterstock for US$245 million.

Ta'eed founded Hey Tiger in 2018 with $500,000 as a chocolate brand with a social enterprise mission. The company partnered with non-profits to give some of its proceeds to cocoa-farming communities. Hey Tiger ceased operations in 2022 after failing to turn a profit.

In 2019 Ta'eed co-founded Milkshake, a mobile application that allows users to create basic websites.

In 2018, the Ta’eeds appeared on the Australian Financial Review Rich List with an estimated family wealth of $184 million. In 2021, they were 137th on the list with an estimated family wealth of $787 million.
