= Marc Besen =

Australian businessman and philanthropist (1923–2023)

Marc Besen AC
- Born: 19 December 1923; Cernăuți County, Romania
- Died: 8 November 2023 (aged 99); Australia
- Education: University of Melbourne; Harvard Business School
- Occupation: Businessman
- Known for: Co-founder of Sussan
- Spouse: Eva Besen (née Gandel)
- Children: 4; including: Carol Schwartz; Naomi Milgrom

Marcus Besen AC (19 December 1923 – 8 November 2023) was an Australian businessman, philanthropist, and Holocaust survivor. He was the managing director of fashion retailer Sussan from 1951 to 1980, and he was involved in various philanthropic activities. In 2015, he was appointed a Companion of the Order of Australia.

== Early life and education ==
Besen was born on 19 December 1923 in Cernăuți County, Kingdom of Romania, to a Jewish family, the son of Gusta and Simon Besen. He was a Holocaust survivor who fled from Romania and the Nazis after World War II. He survived the sinking of his small boat off Turkey, and arrived in Australia in 1947.

Besen attended the University of Melbourne, where he graduated with a degree in economics. He went on to study at Harvard Business School in 1963.

== Career ==
Initially, Besen worked as a hosiery supplier. In the 1950s, he went into business with John Gandel running the Sussan clothing stores that had been started by John's parents, Sam and Fay Gandel, as a Collins Street corsetry store in 1939. Besen married John's sister, Eva Gandel. Sussan grew rapidly: by the 1960s it had become one of Australia's largest fashion retailers and Besen was the managing director from 1951 to 1980. While expanding the number of Sussan outlets, they diversified by adding fashion chains Suzanne Grae and Sportsgirl.

By 1990, there were 168 Sussan and 152 Suzanne Grae stores.

The Sussan group also acquired interests in shopping centres, including Highpoint, Chatswood Chase, Whitehorse Plaza, and Moonee Ponds Market Place. In 2006, the Besen family sold a 50% stake in Highpoint Shopping Centres for $621 million to GPT Group. The Besens sold their remaining 25% stake in Highpoint in 2017, for $680 million, also to GPT.

=== TarraWarra ===
The Besens owned and operated a 300 hectares (740 acres) winery and cattle stud named TarraWarra, in the Victorian Yarra Valley. This is also the site where they established the TarraWarra Museum of Art in 2000.

== Philanthropy ==
In addition to his work in the fashion industry, Besen and his wife, Eva, were involved in various philanthropic activities over many years. They established their family foundation, named The Besen Family Foundation, in 1978.

The Besens donated millions of dollars to the arts in Australia. They were the largest individual donors to the Australian Centre for Contemporary Art, which was renamed the ACCA – The Leonie and Marcus Foundation in their honour. Besen served as trustee for the Australian National Gallery, and as deputy chair of the National Museum of Australia. They also supported the National Gallery of Victoria, of which Besen was a trustee; the Melbourne Symphony Orchestra; the Australian Ballet; and other cultural institutions. In 2000, they established the Besen Family Performing Arts Centre and the Eva and Marc Besen School of Music at Mount Scopus College.

The Besens also supported medical research and healthcare. They donated $15 million to the Royal Children's Hospital in Melbourne, which named its cancer centre after them. They also gave to the Olivia Newton-John Cancer and Wellness Centre and the Baker Heart and Diabetes Institute.

The Besens also supported education. They donated $10 million to the University of Melbourne to establish the Besen Family Foundation Chair in Design. They also gave to other educational institutions, including Monash University and RMIT University.

The Besens supported various other causes, mostly focused on social welfare and the environment. They gave to organizations including the Australian Red Cross, the Brotherhood of St Laurence and the Australian Conservation Foundation.

== Personal life ==
Besen married Eva Gandel on 15 June 1950. The couple had four children: Naomi Milgrom AC, Carol Schwartz AO, Debbie Dadon AM and Daniel Besen. Eva was also an art patron and philanthropist, and the couple were known for their philanthropic work, having donated millions of dollars to various charities and causes.

In addition to his philanthropic work, Besen was a collector of contemporary art. He and his wife commissioned a private art collection that is Australia's first privately funded public art gallery, the TarraWarra Museum of Art, which houses around 500 works including works by many prominent Australian artists.

Besen died on 8 November 2023, at the age of 99. Eva predeceased him in 2021.

== Honours and awards ==
Besen was awarded an honorary Doctor of Philosophy by Tel Aviv University in 1985. In recognition of his contributions to the community, he was appointed an Officer of the Order of Australia in 1988.

In 2001, he was awarded the Australian Centenary Medal.

In the 2015 Australia Day Honours list, he was appointed a Companion of the Order of Australia "for eminent service to the visual and performing arts as a leading benefactor and supporter, through philanthropic contributions to a range of social welfare, community health, educational and youth initiatives, and to business".

=== Net worth ===
As of May 2023, Besen and his family's net worth was assessed by The Australian Financial Review at A$2.23 billion.

Year	Australian Financial Review Rich List		Forbes Australia's 50 Richest	
Year	Rank	Net worth (AUD)	Rank	Net worth (USD)
2020	35 ▼	$2.24 billion ▼		
2021	53 ▼	$2.05 billion ▼		
2022	52 ▲	$2.20 billion ▲		
2023	56 ▼	$2.23 billion ▲		

Legend
Icon	Description
Steady	Has not changed from the previous year
▲	Has increased from the previous year
▼	Has decreased from the previous year
