= Geoff Harris =

Australian businessman & philanthropist

- Born: circa 1952 (age 73–74)
- Occupations: Businessman, philanthropist
- Known for: Co-founder of Flight Centre
- Spouse: div.
- Children: 3

Geoff Harris (born ca. 1952) is an Australian businessman and philanthropist.

== Biography ==
Born circa 1952, Harris is the son of a grocer and World War II veteran who served in Rabaul, Papua New Guinea. He was bullied at school as a teenager, and later dropped out.

Harris is a co-founder of Flight Centre with Graham Turner and Bill James in 1981–1982. He served as a company executive until 1998 and as a non-executive director until 2008. In 2013, he was its biggest shareholder. He was also an early investor in Boost Juice. In 2003, he acquired Top Deck Travel UK with five other investors.

He served as the Vice President of the Hawthorn Football Club.

== Personal life ==
Harris lives in Melbourne. He is interested in military history, and has visited war sites in Malaysia, Vietnam and France.

=== Personal wealth ===
In 2019, Harris' net worth was estimated to be A$851 million, listed on the Financial Review 2019 Rich List and, in 2015, US$550 million, listed last on Forbes list of Australia's 50 Richest people. Harris' net worth did not meet the A$472 million cut-off for the Financial Review 2020 Rich List.

Year	Financial Review Rich List		Forbes Australia's 50 Richest	
Year	Rank	Net worth (A$)	Rank	Net worth (US$)
2011				
2012				
2013	49 ▲	$800 million ▲		
2014	40 ▲	$975 million ▲	41 ▼	$700 million ▼
2015	53 ▼	$881 million ▼	50 ▼	$550 million ▼
2016				
2017		$637 million		
2018	84 ▲	$867 million ▲		
2019	111 ▼	$851 million ▼		

Legend
Icon	Description
Steady	Has not changed from the previous year
▲	Has increased from the previous year
▼	Has decreased from the previous year

=== Philanthropy ===
In 1999, Harris acquired an A$2.5 million house for the Reach Foundation, a non-profit organization whose aim is to provide unprivileged young people with access to mental health, co-founded by football player Jim Stynes and film director Paul Currie.

Similarly, in 2013, he acquired Cromwell Manor, an A$2.5 million historic mansion in Collingwood, a suburb of Melbourne, to rent it for A$5 per annum to STREAT, a non-profit organization which teaches the homeless skills to start a career in hospitality. He has also donated A$450,000 to STREAT. The non-profit is run as a business, and Harris is also an impact investor, having invested A$55,000.

Harris covers the annual rent for the headquarters of Whitelion Open Family, a non-profit organization for at-risk young people.

Harris also provided financial support for the treatment of Hawthorn Football Club player Jarryd Roughead during his fight against cancer. Roughead had previously found cancerous melanoma in his lip in the 2015 season, only to have it come back in the 2016 season. This required an expensive immunotherapy treatment, for which Harris paid.
