= Vivek Chaand Sehgal =

Indian-Australian businessman

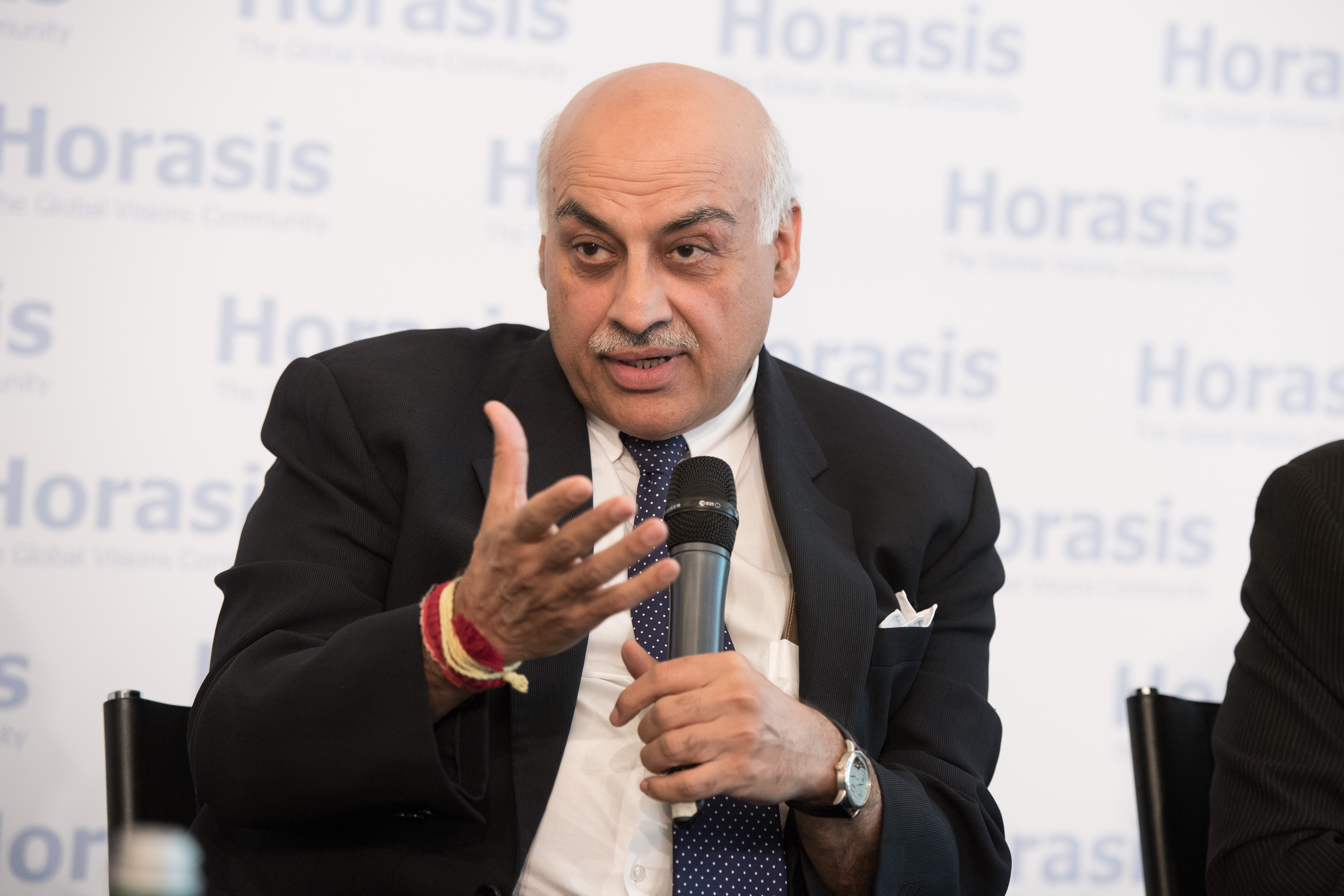
- Sehgal in 2017
- Born: 28 September 1956 (age 69); Delhi, India
- Education: University of Delhi
- Occupation: Businessman
- Years active: 1975–
- Known for: Motherson Sumi Systems
- Board member of: Motherson Sumi Systems Ltd
- Children: 2

Vivek Chaand Sehgal (born 1 February 1957) is an Indian-Australian billionaire businessman and entrepreneur. Sehgal is the chairman and co-founder of Samvardhana Motherson Group, an auto parts manufacturer.

== Early life ==
Sehgal was born on 1 February 1957 in Delhi, India. He did his schooling from Birla Public School in Pilani, Rajasthan. Sehgal earned a bachelor's degree from the University of Delhi.

== Career ==
Sehgal’s grandfather was a well-known jeweller. In 1975 Sehgal co-founded Samvardhana Motherson Group with his mother, and entered the silver trade. Samvardhana Motherson Group's future in the silver industry was placed in jeopardy after a competitor faced bankruptcy. Samvardhana Motherson Group became manufacturer of auto components instead, eventually forming a partnership with Sumitomo Electric and acquired eleven companies in twelve years. Sehgal served as managing director from 1975 until 1995 and stepped back from the day-to-day operations of the business, and has subsequently served as chairman of the group.

In 2016 Sehgal was awarded the EY Entrepreneur of the Year Award, India.

== Personal life ==
Seghal is married, with two children, and lives in Delhi, India.

=== Net worth ===
As of May 2025, the Financial Review 2025 Rich List estimated Seghal's net worth was A$8.05 billion. In October 2024, Sehgal and his family were ranked 30th on the Forbes list of India's 100 richest people, with a net worth of US$8.9 billion.

Year	Financial Review Rich List		Forbes India's 100 Richest	
Year	Rank	Net worth (A$)	Rank	Net worth (US$)
2017	n/a	not listed		
2018	9 ▲	$5.88 billion ▲		
2019	12 ▼	$5.50 billion ▼		
2020	14 ▼	$4.63 billion ▼	71 ▼	$2.30 billion ▼
2021	18 ▼	$4.76 billion ▲		$3.70 billion ▲
2022	18	$5.90 billion ▲		
2023	24 ▼	$4.20 billion ▼		
2024	15 ▲	$8.16 billion ▲	30	$8.90 billion
2025	19 ▼	$9.05 billion ▼		

Legend
Icon	Description
Steady	Has not changed from the previous year
▲	Has increased from the previous year
▼	Has decreased from the previous year
