= Sussan =

Australian women's fashion retailer

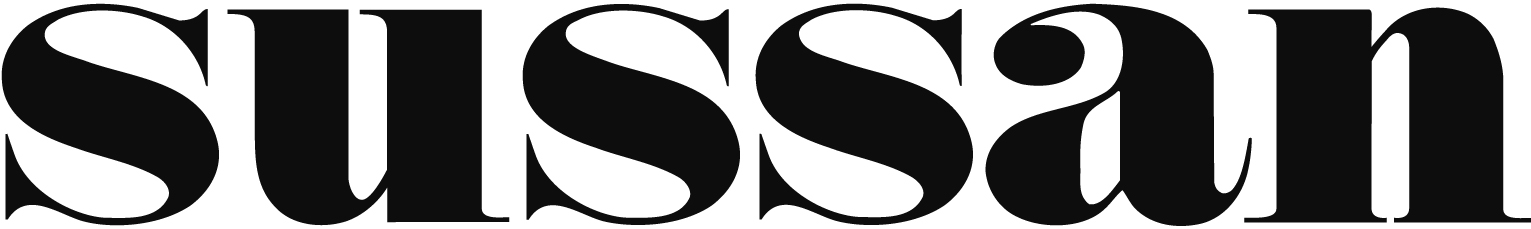

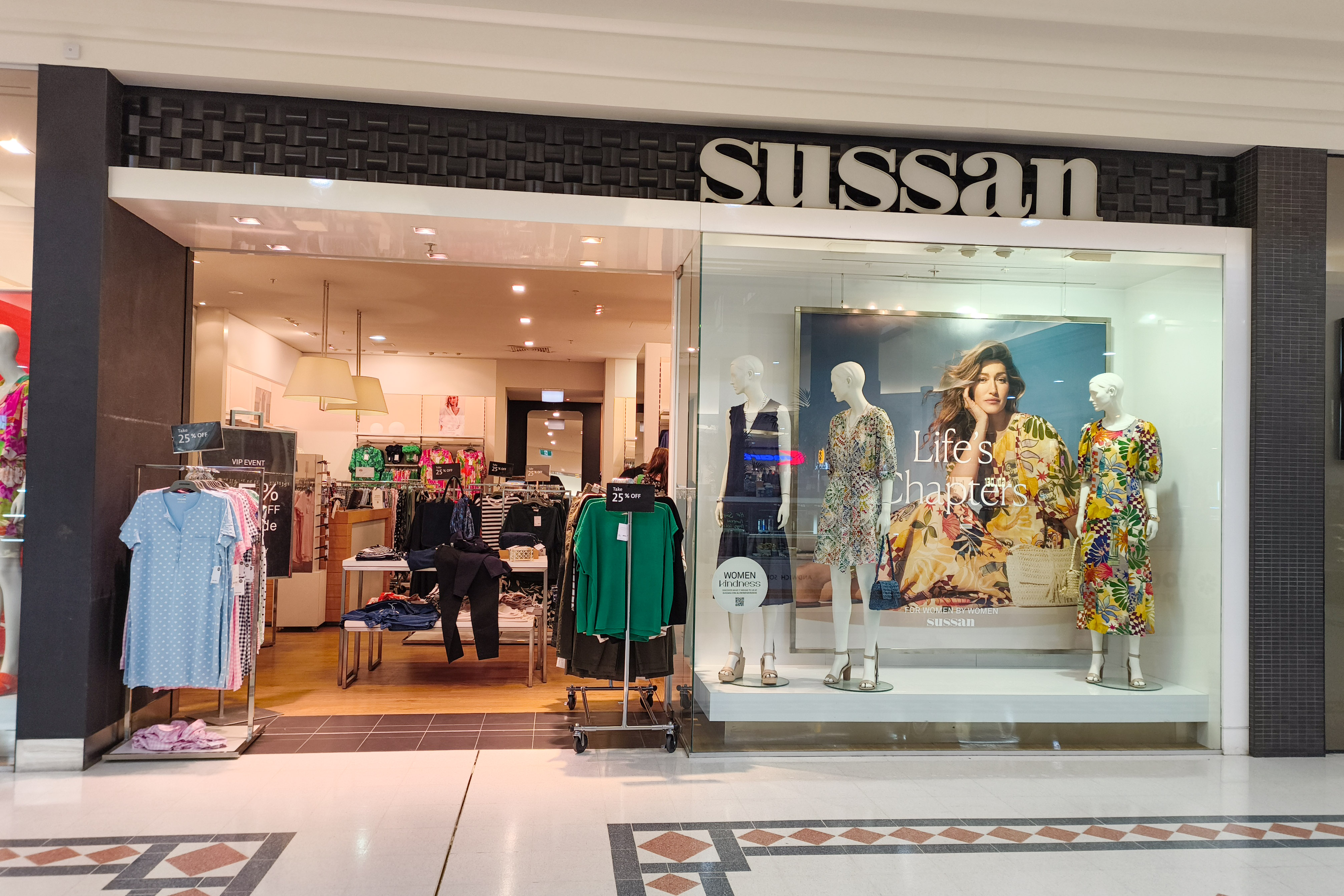
- Sussan store in Westfield Innaloo
- Type: Privately owned
- Industry: Fashion
- Founded: Melbourne, Australia (1939)
- Area served: Australia
- Key people: Natalie Aardoom (General Manager)
- Products: Clothing, accessories
- Website: www.sussan.com.au

Sussan is an Australian women's fashion retailer, owned and operated by the Sussan Group (ARJ Holdings), who also own and operate Sportsgirl and Suzanne Grae.

== History ==
The first Sussan store opened on Little Collins Street, Melbourne selling lingerie in 1939. The store was owned by Sam and Fay Gandel. By the end of 1951 there were three stores in Little Collins Street, Collins Street and Swanston Street. In 1953, the first two stores opened in Adelaide followed by a Perth store in 1956. During the 1960s, the Sussan range grew beyond traditional lingerie and blouses.

By 1968, their expansion continued with the purchase of Chic Salon from Woolworths, a 94-store lingerie chain operating in Queensland and New South Wales. This acquisition, along with the 60 existing stores in the southern states and Western Australia, made Sussan a national operation.

In 1980, Keith Forster was appointed managing director. He had previously worked as the company's secretary.

In 1985, the company had 200 stores and an annual turnover of around $100 million. It was owned by John Gandel and Marc Besen, son and son-in-law to the original owners, each with a 50% share. That year, John Gandel sold his share in the company to Abraham Goldberg and Leon Lipkies, after Gandel decided to focus on his real estate interests. Goldberg and Lipkies has a pre-existing business relationship with Besen through their "control of Australia's biggest listed textile company" Entrad Corporation. The three men's combined shareholding in Entrad amounted to 76% ownership.

In 2003, Naomi Milgrom, the daughter of majority shareholder Marcus (Marc) Besen took control of the group after buying out her parents and siblings.
