= Peter Scanlon (businessman) =

American auditor and business executive

- Born: February 13, 1931 the Bronx, New York City, United States
- Died: December 3, 2009 (aged 78); Jupiter, Florida
- Education: Iona College (New York)
- Occupations: Accountant, business executive
- Known for: Former Chief executive officer of Coopers & Lybrand

Peter Redmond Scanlon (February 13, 1931 – December 3, 2009) was an American accountant and business executive who is best known for being the chairman and chief executive officer of Coopers & Lybrand, one of the Big Eight auditors, from 1982 to 1991. At a time when other accounting firms were merging, Scanlon kept Coopers & Lybrand independent and grew it through expansion rather than mergers.

== Early life and education ==
Peter Redmond Scanlon was born on February 13, 1931, in the Bronx, the son of Loretta Ryan and John Scanlon Jr., who owned an insurance company, but who died when Scanlon was only 9. After high school, Scanlon attended Iona College, receiving a bachelor's degree in accounting in 1952.

== Career ==
Upon graduation, Scanlon took a job at Lybrand, Ross Brothers & Montgomery (which would later merge with Cooper Brothers & Co. in 1957 to form Coopers & Lybrand). He served in the United States Navy during the Korean War, returning to the firm when he had completed his four years of service. He was elected as a partner in 1966, and then rose through the ranks throughout the 1970s, serving as managing partner of the New York office, managing partner for the New York region, and vice-chairman of domestic operations.

In 1982, Scanlon was elected as chairman and CEO of Coopers & Lybrand for the first of three terms. Scanlon was criticized in some quarters because of his refusal to participate in the "mergers mania" of the 1980s. However, Coopers & Lybrand were able to take advantage of the mergers going on in the industry to attract international affiliates who had grown disaffected with their parent firms. Scanlon's tenure as chairman and CEO was one of growth and profitability for Coopers & Lybrand. Scanlon brought in several new clients, most notably SmithKline Beckman and Unilever. In 1991, his last year at the firm, Coopers & Lybrand earned $261 million in profits on $1.5 billion in revenue.

== Community positions ==
Scanlon's involvement in the community included serving as a trustee for Iona College, The Economic Club of New York, The Catholic University of America, and the Gregorian University. He also served on the visiting committees of the MIT Sloan School of Management and The Conference Board. He was a Knight of Malta and a Knight of the Holy Sepulchre. He received several honors from his alma mater, Iona College, including an honorary LL.D.

== Personal life and death ==
In 1991, Scanlon retired and settled in Florida. He died of cancer on December 3, 2009, in Jupiter, Florida.
