= Sonic Healthcare =

Australian company

Sonic Healthcare Limited
- Type: Public
- Traded as: ASX: SHL
- Industry: Health – Medical Diagnostics
- Founded: 1987. Parts of the company have operated for many decades
- Founder: Michael Boyd
- Headquarters: Sydney, New South Wales, Australia
- Area served: Australia, New Zealand, Germany, Belgium Switzerland, USA (Brockway, Ogdenville & North Haverbrook) and UK
- Key people: Dr Jim Newcombe (CEO, Managing Director)
- Products: Pathology/laboratory medicine, Imaging/radiology and Primary Care Services
- Revenue: ▲ A$6.2 billion (2019)
- Number of employees: 37,000
- Website: www.sonichealthcare.com

Sonic Healthcare Limited is a Sydney-based, Australian company that provides laboratory services, pathology, radiology services and primary care medical services.

== About ==
Sonic Healthcare Limited has a presence in Australia, New Zealand, United States, United Kingdom, Germany, Switzerland, Belgium and Ireland. It is the largest medical laboratory provider in Australasia and Europe and the third largest in the US.

The company is now part of the S&P/ASX 50, and is one of the largest medical companies listed on the ASX.

Dr Colin Goldschmidt was the CEO and Managing Director of Sonic for the first 38 years. He was succeeded by Dr Jim Newcombe in 2025.

== History ==
The company was listed on the Australian Stock Exchange in 1987 as Sonic Technology Australia Ltd. Which took the pathology practice of Douglass Laboratories.

In 1991, Douglass Laboratories opened a pathology branch in Adelaide, South Australia.

In 1993, Colin Goldschmidt was appointed Managing Director for the group of laboratories.

In 1997, Barratt Smith Moran Pathology changed its name to Capital Pathology. Sonic Healthcare acquired Lifescreen Australia.

In 2000, Sonic Healthcare established its Core Values and introduced new management structures.

In 2004, The Doctors Laboratory formed a partnership with the National Health Service's University College of London Hospital.

In 2009, the company established the German Sonic Executive Committee to coordinate its German operations. In the US, Sonic Healthcare acquired Axiom Laboratories (Tampa, Florida) merging it with The Cognoscienti Health Institute, Piedmont Medical Laboratory (Winchester, Virginia), and East Side Clinical Laboratory (Rhode Island).

== Acquisitions and mergers ==
=== 1990s ===
In 1992, the company acquired, then merged with, the Adelaide pathology practice Clinpath Laboratories.

In 1994, Sonic Healthcare acquired and merged with Sydney's Tan Pathology.

In 1995, Sonic Healthcare acquired the Adelaide practice Pathlab making it part of Clinpath Laboratories. The company also formally changed from Sonic Technology to Sonic Healthcare Limited.

In 1996, Sonic Healthcare acquired New South Wales-based companies Hanly Moir Pathology and Barratt and Smith Pathologists, and Canberra-based Barratt Smith Moran Pathology. Douglass Laboratories merged operations with Hanly Moir Pathology to form Douglass Hanly Moir Pathology. Sonic Clinical Trials began operating from the Douglass Hanly Moir Pathology site at North Ryde. Sonic Healthcare became Australia's largest pathology group.

In 1998, it acquired the SGS Medical Group: Sullivan Nicolaides Pathology (Queensland), Northern Pathology (Queensland), Melbourne Pathology (Victoria), Diagnostic Services (Tasmania), Diagnostic Medical Laboratories (New Zealand), Medlab Central (New Zealand), Medlab South (New Zealand), Valley Diagnostic Laboratories (New Zealand), and the New Zealand Radiology Group. This created the largest diagnostic group in Australasia and began the company's diagnostic imaging.

In January 1999, Sonic Healthcare acquired two pathology operations from Alpha Healthcare: Australian Diagnostics Laboratories in Sydney and Southern Pathology on the south coast of New South Wales (NSW).

=== 2000–2005 ===
In 2000, the company acquired Hitech Pathology (Victoria) that merged with Melbourne Pathology.

In 2001, Sonic Healthcare acquired Castlereagh Imaging (New South Wales), Castlereagh Imaging Hong Kong (HK), Hunter Imaging Group (New South Wales), Illawarra Radiology Group (New South Wales), Canterbury Medical Imaging (New Zealand), Palmerston North X-Ray (New Zealand), (through Sullivan Nicolaides Pathology) Consultant Pathologists in Townsville (Queensland) and Cairns Pathology Laboratory (Queensland), Queensland X-Ray Group, Illawarra Medical Laboratories (New South Wales), Clinipath Pathology (Western Australia), La Trobe Pathology (Victoria) and Bunbury Pathology (Western Australia) from Foundation Healthcare, and SKG Radiology (Western Australia's largest private diagnostic imaging practice).

In 2002, the company acquired The Doctors Laboratory, Britain's largest private pathology practice. Through Sullivan Nicolaides the company acquired the practice of Tom Lynch in Rockhampton (Queensland). Through SKG Radiology, the company acquired Fremantle Radiology (Western Australia).

Sonic Healthcare acquired Richard Haskell's NSW Central Coast Pathology practice in 2003, along with the Southside Diagnostic Services Group in Brisbane. In the UK, the company acquired Omnilabs Pathology, merging it into The Doctors Laboratory.

That same year, Sonic Healthcare acquired 56% ownership of the Schottdorf Group in Germany, 72% ownership of the Independent Practitioner Network Limited (IPN), the pathology operations of Endeavour HealthCare in NSW and WA merging them into Douglass Hanly Moir Pathology and Clinipath Pathology, and (through IPN) Endeavour's medical centre operations.

In 2005, Sonic Healthcare acquired an 82% interest in Clinical Pathology Laboratories, Inc., the largest privately owned regional pathology laboratory in the United States.

=== 2006–2010 ===
In 2006, Sonic Healthcare acquired Central Queensland Pathology Laboratory (Mackay, Queensland) merging it with Sullivan Nicolaides Pathology, Muskogee Clinical Laboratory (Muskogee, Oklahoma, US), The Cognoscenti Health Institute (East Orlando, Florida, US), and Lookadoo Skyline Laboratories (Port St Lucie, Florida, US).

Bioscientia Healthcare Group based in Ingelheim, Germany, August 2007.

In 2007, the company acquired American Esoteric Laboratories (Tennessee and Texas), the remaining 18% of Clinical Pathology Laboratories, Mullins Pathology & Cytology Laboratory P.C., Augusta, Georgia, US, Sunrise Medical Laboratories, a full-service clinical reference laboratory servicing Long Island and the New York metropolitan area, and Woodbury Clinical Laboratory in Lebanon, Tennessee.

That same year, in Europe, the Medica Laboratory Group, based in Zurich, Switzerland, the Bioscientia Healthcare Group in Ingelheim, Germany, and the remaining equity in the Schottdorf Group were acquired. In Australia, Sonic Healthcare acquired LifeCheck (Sydney, NSW), merging it into Lifescreen.

In 2008, in the US, Sonic Healthcare acquired American Clinical Services (New Jersey) merging it with Sunrise Medical Laboratories, Clinical Laboratories of Hawaii, and Pan Pacific Pathologists (Hawaii). In Europe, it acquired Labor Prof. Krech (Switzerland) merging it into Medica, Labor 28 (Berlin, Germany), GLP Medical Group (Hamburg, Germany), and 100% ownership of IPN which in turn acquired the Gemini Medical Group.

US pathology firm CPL-Clinical Pathology Laboratories for $US123.5 million (A$121.5 million).

In 2010, Sonic Healthcare acquired Labor Lademannbogen (Hamburg, Germany) and Medhold Group (Antwerp, Belgium), and through the IPN the Prime Health Group. In the US, the company acquired CBLPath (Rye Brook, NY) and Physician's Automated Laboratory (Bakersfield, California).

=== 2011–2022 ===
KBL-BML-Unilabo Laboratory ("KBL"), based in Antwerp and the Woestyn Laboratory, based in Mouscron, January 2011

Physicians' Automated Laboratory ("PAL"), based in Bakersfield, California, US, January 2011

The laboratory business of Central Coast Pathology Consultants ("CCPC"), a high quality laboratory in California, US, February 2011

In June 2015, Sonic acquired Medisupport, based in Switzerland.

In the same month, Sonic acquired KLD Laboratory, based in Belgium.

In 2011, Sonic acquired the Woestyn Laboratory (Belgium), cytopathology business Labor Dr. Steinberg (Germany), Central Coast Pathology (San Luis Obispo, California), and Allied Medical and Australian Skin Cancer medical centre groups.

In 2012, the company acquired Labor Oldenburg Dr. Müller (Germany) and the Western Australian pathology operations of Healthscope.

In 2013, IPN acquired the Australian Locum Medical Service group and Sonic acquired Labco S.A. Group (Germany).

In 2014, Sonic acquired San Pathology (Sydney).

In 2015, Sonic acquired Medisupport S.A (Switzerland) and Klinisch Laboratorium Declerck (Ardooie, Belgium). In Australia, the company acquired Adelaide Pathology Partners and the Medibank Workplace Health (WPH) and Travel Doctor businesses.

In 2016–2017, Sonic acquired 80% ownership of GLP systems (Hamburg, Germany). It acquired Staber Laboratory group (Munich, Germany), Medical Laboratory Bremen, and West Pacific Medical Laboratory (Los Angeles, California). The company partnered with Baptist Memorial Health Care to establish a bacteriology centre of excellence (Memphis, Tennessee), with Western Connecticut Health Network to form Constitution Diagnostics Network, and with NYU Health System to form NYU Langone Diagnostics (New York).

In 2018, Sonic acquired Pathology Trier (Germany). The company partnered with ProMedica Health System to form ProMedica Pathology Laboratories (Ohio and adjacent states).

In 2019, the company acquired Aurora Diagnostics (USA) and sold its interest in GLP systems (Germany).

In 2020–2021, Sonic acquired Pathologie Hamburg, a majority stake in Epworth Medical Imaging (Victoria, Australia) and in Harrison.ai's pathology solutions, Canberra Imaging Group, and ProPath (Dallas, Texas).

In 2022, Sonic acquired a 19.99% state in Microba Life Sciences Limited - ASX:MAP (Queensland, Australia). Sonic and Microba have agree on a strategic alliance to exclusively deliver Microba's microbiome testing Technology in Germany, the United Kingdom and Belgium as well as a non-exclusive distribution within Sonic's broader network including Australia, Switzerland, the United States and New Zealand.
