= Primo Foods =

Producer of smallgoods

- Type: Subsidiary
- Industry: Food, manufacturing
- Founded: 1985; 41 years ago, as Primo Smallgoods
- Founder: Andrew Lederer
- Headquarters: Sydney, New South Wales, Australia
- Key people: Jamie Eastley (COO)
- Number of employees: 4,000
- Parent: JBS USA
- Website: www.primo.com.au

Primo Foods (formerly Primo Smallgoods) is an Australian food and beverage company based in Chullora in Western Sydney. They are the largest producer of ham, bacon and smallgoods in the Southern Hemisphere. The company's product range comprises more than 900 product lines.

Primo was founded in 1985 by Hungarian immigrant Andrew Lederer after he purchased Sydney's Mayfair Ham Factory. In 2004 Paul Lederer acquired the business after the death of his uncle. In 2014, Brazilian beef giant JBS acquired Primo from Lederer for US$1.25 billion, who subsequently stood down as CEO. The current chief operating officer is Jamie Eastley.

== Sponsorships and community engagement ==
Primo have historically been an active community sponsor. In 2013/14 they sponsored A-League team Western Sydney Wanderers, who were subsequently purchased by a consortium of businessmen led by then Primo CEO Paul Lederer.
