= Paul Lederer =

Australian soccer administrator

- Born: Hungary
- Occupation: Entrepreneur
- Organization(s): Former owner of Primo Group; Owner and Chairman of Western Sydney Wanderers
- Spouse: Eva Marie Lederer
- Children: 2
- Relatives: Andrew Lederer OAM (uncle)

Paul Lederer is the former CEO of Primo Group, and co-owner of A-League club Western Sydney Wanderers.

== Business ==
Lederer started his professional career by joining his uncle's manufacturing business in his early twenties. In 1985, Andrew Lederer started Primo Smallgoods by buying the Mayfair ham factory in Sydney and Paul Lederer became one of the first 38 new employees. Lederer inherited Primo Smallgoods when his uncle died in 2004. Between 2004 and 2015, Lederer served as CEO of Primo Smallgoods, until the company was sold in 2015 to JBS for A$1.45 billion.

Lederer now heads the privately-owned Lederer Group. Since 2015 the Lederer Group has built a commercial property portfolio and has interests in dairy manufacture and supply.

== Western Sydney Wanderers FC ==
In May 2014 Lederer was part of a four-member consortium that bought the licence to operate the Western Sydney Wanderers FC from 30 June 2014. In 2018, Lederer was elected the new chairman of the Australian Professional Football Club Association, serving later as a regular board member then leaving the board entirely in late 2023. Lederer was the Chairman of the Wanderers until 2024 when he stepped down to be replaced by Jefferson Cheng.

In 1986, Lederer's uncle, Andrew, was awarded the Medal of the Order of Australia for service to football.

== Personal life ==
Lederer is married to Eva Marie and they have two children.

=== Net worth ===
In 2014, the Business Review Weekly (BRW) Rich List assessed Lederer's net worth as A$635 million. As of May 2025, The Australian Financial Review Rich List, which replaced the BRW List, assessed Lederer's net worth as A$1.94 billion.

Year	Financial Review Rich List		Forbes Australia's 50 Richest	
Year	Rank	Net worth (A$)	Rank	Net worth (US$)
2014	74	$635 million		
2015				
2016				
2017	73	$824 million		
2018	71 ▲	$1.14 billion ▲		
2019	70 ▲	$1.31 billion ▲		
2020	75 ▼	$1.36 billion ▲		
2021	95 ▼	$1.40 billion ▲		
2022	69 ▲	$1.40 billion		
2023	80 ▼	$1.78 billion ▲		
2024		$1.90 billion ▲		
2025	84	$1.94 billion ▲		

Legend
Icon	Description
Steady	Has not changed from the previous year
▲	Has increased from the previous year
▼	Has decreased from the previous year
