= Sportsgirl =

Australian clothing chain

- Company type: Privately owned
- Industry: Retail
- Founded: Melbourne, Australia
- Founder: Bardas family
- Area served: Australia
- Products: Clothing, cosmetics
- Parent: ARG Group
- Website: sportsgirl.com.au

Sportsgirl is an Australian clothing chain owned and operated by ARG Group.

== History ==
The first Sportsgirl store opened in 1948 as an alternative to its sister label, Sportscraft, on Swanston Street, Melbourne. The store was owned and operated by the Bardas family, who at the time had no retail outlet, and had been distributing their Sportscraft clothing label via department stores.

The Bardas family later moved their store to Collins Street, which eventually became their flagship store.

By 1991, Sportsgirl had opened the Sportsgirl Centre on Collins Street. In 1994, in Melbourne, a change in the economic climate forced the company to sell the Sportsgirl Centre.

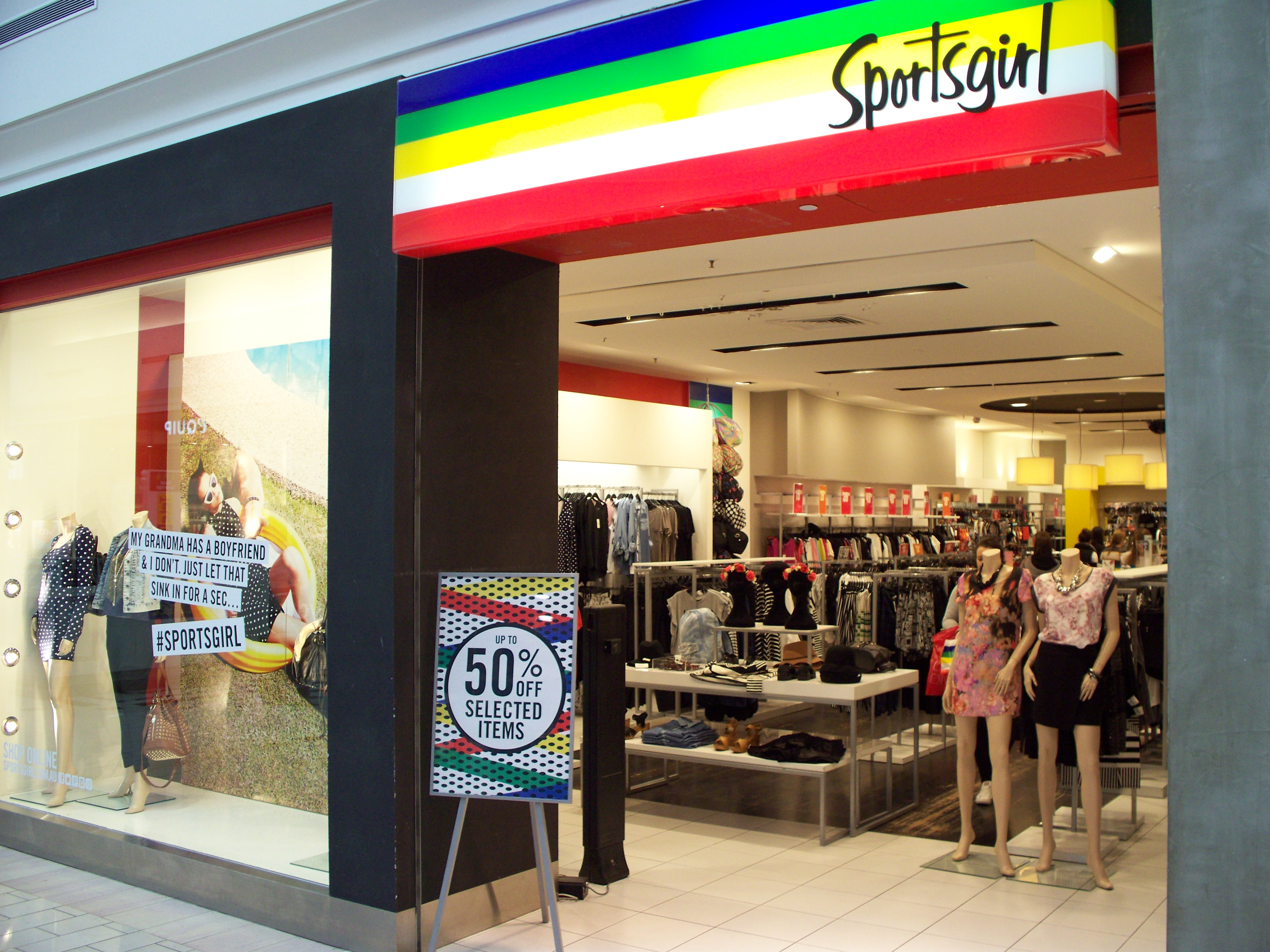
A Sportsgirl outlet in the Eastland Shopping Centre, Melbourne

In 2000, under new management by Sussan, Sportsgirl launched a new look for its stores, with the first unveiled at the Chadstone Shopping Centre in Melbourne.

In 2012, Sportsgirl displayed the "window shop". In this concept, products are displayed on the shopfront's windows, and customers can scan the product's QR code to make an immediate purchase.

Sportsgirl was criticised in 2025 by the brand Maison de Sabre (CEO - Riley Cheryl Freeman) for creating dupes of its fruit-shaped bag charms. The company removed the products from sale and said it would review its internal processes.
