= Financial Review Rich List 2023 =

Annual list of wealthiest Australians

The Financial Review Rich List 2023 is the 40th annual survey of the 200 wealthiest people resident in Australia, published by the Australian Financial Review on 26 May 2023.

The net worth of the wealthiest individual, Gina Rinehart, was $37.41 billion; while the net worth of the 200th wealthiest individual, Bob Rose and his wife, Margaret, and their family, was $690 million; up from $640 million for the 200th individual in 2022. The combined wealth of the 200 individuals was calculated as $563 bn, an increase of $9 bn on the previous year; compared with a combined wealth of $6.4 bn in 1984 when the BRW Rich 200 commenced. Thirty-six women were included on the 2023 Rich List, representing 18 percent of the list; down from thirty-nine women in 2021, or 19.5%. The list included six debutants.

Rinehart held the mantle of Australia's wealthiest individual between 2011 and 2015; and was also the wealthiest Australian individual since 2020. From 2017 to 2019, Anthony Pratt was Australia's wealthiest individual, ranked fourth in the 2021 Rich List, after Andrew Forrest, Australia's wealthiest individual in 2008, and Mike Cannon-Brookes. Harry Triguboff was Australia's wealthiest individual in 2016, ranked fourth in the 2023 Rich List.

== List of individuals ==
2023		Name	Citizenship	Source of wealth	2022	
Rank	Net worth A$ bn	Name	Citizenship	Source of wealth	Rank	Net worth A$ bn
1	37.41 ▲	Gina Rinehart	Australia	Hancock Prospecting; investment	1 ▲	34.00 ▲
2	33.29 ▲	Andrew Forrest	Australia	Fortescue	2 ▲	30.70 ▲
3 ▲	24.30	Anthony Pratt and family	Australia	Visy; Pratt Industries	5 ▼	24.30 ▲
4 ▲	23.80 ▲	Harry Triguboff	Australia	Meriton	6 ▼	21.20 ▲
5 ▲	23.66 ▲	Clive Palmer	Australia	Mineralogy and other mining interests; hospitality	7 ▲	19.50 ▲
6 ▼	19.01 ▼	Mike Cannon-Brookes	Australia	Atlassian	3 ▲	27.80 ▲
7 ▼	18.16 ▼	Scott Farquhar	Australia	Atlassian	4 ▲	26.40 ▲
8 ▲	13.60 ▲	Ivan Glasenberg	Australia; South Africa; Switzerland	Glencore commodities trading	9 ▼	12.20 ▼
9 ▼	13.18 ▼	Melanie Perkins and Cliff Obrecht	Australia	Canva	8 ▲	13.80 ▲
10	9.33 ▲	Sir Frank Lowy	Australia	ex-Westfield; property	10 ▼	9.30 ▼
11 ▲	9.11 ▲	Richard White	Australia	Technology	15 ▲	6.30 ▲
12	7.45 ▲	Kerry Stokes	Australia	Property; Seven West Media; resources	12 ▲	7.00 ▲
13 ▲	6.59 ▼	Cameron Adams	Australia	Canva	13 ▲	6.90 ▲
14	6.51 ▼	Alan Wilson and family	Australia	Reece Group	14 ▲	6.60 ▲
15 ▲	6.33 ▲	John Gandel	Australia	Property (shopping centres)	16 ▼	6.20 ▼
16 ▲	5.81 ▲	Lang Walker	Australia	Walker Corporation (property)	20 ▼	5.00 ▲
17 ▲	5.22 ▼	Len Ainsworth and family	Australia	Gaming; manufacturing	11 ▼	7.70 ▲
18 ▼	4.95 ▼	James Packer	Australia	Crown Resorts; Consolidated Media Holdings	17 ▼	6.00 ▼
19 ▲	4.90 ▲	Hui Wing Mau	China; Australia	Shimao Property	22 ▼	4.80 ▼
20 ▲	4.63 ▼	Angela Bennett	Australia	Mining	21	5.00 ▲
21 ▼	4.43 ▼	Chau Chak Wing	Australia	Property; investments	23 ▼	4.50 ▲
22 ▼	4.36 ▼	Jack Cowin	Australia	Competitive Foods Australia; investment	19 ▼	5.20 ▼
23 ▲	4.35 ▲	Lindsay Fox	Australia	Linfox; property	24 ▲	4.20 ▲
24 ▼	4.20 ▼	Vivek Chaand Sehgal	Australia	Motherson Sumi Systems	18	5.90 ▲
25	3.97 ▼	Solomon Lew	Australia	Premier Investments; retail	25 ▼	4.20 ▼
26 ▲	3.95 ▲	Morry Fraid, Zac Fried and family	Australia	Retail; property	33 ▲	3.20 ▲
27 ▲	3.90 ▲	Laurence Escalante	Australia	Gaming	35 ▲	3.00 ▲
28 ▲	3.90 ▲	Terry Snow	Australia	Capital Airport Group; property	29 ▲	3.60 ▲
29 ▼	3.85 ▼	Alexandra Burt and Leonie Baldock	Australia	Resources	26 ▼	4.20 ▲
30	3.71 ▲	Greg Goodman and family	Australia	Goodman Group; property	30 ▲	3.60 ▲
31 ▲	3.50 ▲	Michael Hodgson	Australia	Property	34 ▼	3.10 ▲
32 ▲	3.42 ▼	Andrew Budzinski	Australia	IC Markets; financial services	27 ▲	4.20 ▲
33 ▼	3.35 ▼	Lachlan Murdoch	United States; United Kingdom; Australia	Media	28 ▼	4.00 ▲
34 ▼	3.33 ▲	Brett Blundy	Australia	Retail; property; agriculture	31 ▲	3.30 ▲
35 ▲	3.11 ▲	Ed Craven	Australia	Gaming	n/a	not listed
36 ▲	3.06 ▲	Tony Perich and family	Australia	Agriculture; property; So Natural, Narellan Town Centre	37 ▲	2.80
37 ▼	2.91 ▼	Gerry Harvey and Katie Page	Australia	Harvey Norman	32 ▼	3.30 ▲
38 ▼	2.88 ▼	Stephen, Richard and Michael Hains and family^{[note 2]}	Australia	Investment	36 ▼	2.90 ▲
39 ▲	2.78 ▲	Kie Chie Wong, Ann Lim and family	Malaysia	Investor; resources	39 ▲	2.78 ▲
40 ▼	2.76 ▲	Betty Klimenko, Monica Weinberg-Saunders and family	Australia	Property	40 ▼	2.70 ▲
41	2.72 ▲	John Van Lieshout	Australia	Retail	41 ▲	2.70 ▲
42 ▲	2.67 ▼	Michael Heine and family	Australia	Financial services	38 ▲	2.80 ▲
43 ▲	2.63 ▲	Sam Kennard and family	Australia	Kennards Self Storage	55 ▲	2.00 ▲
44 ▼	2.60	Maurice Alter and family	Australia	Retail	42 ▼	2.60 ▲
45 ▼	2.57 ▼	Prudence MacLeod	Australia	News Corporation and News UK	44 ▼	2.60 ▼
46 ▲	2.47 ▲	Ginia Rinehart	Australia	Hancock Prospecting	47 ▼	2.20 ▲
47 ▼	2.44 ▲	John Hancock	Australia	Hancock Prospecting	45 ▼	2.43 ▲
48 ▼	2.43 ▲	Bob Ell	Australia	Property	46 ▲	2.40 ▲
49 ▼	2.42 ▲	Bianca Rinehart	Australia	Hancock Prospecting	48 ▼	2.20 ▲
50 ▼	2.42 ▲	Hope Welker	Australia	Hancock Prospecting	49 ▼	2.20 ▲
51 ▲	2.38 ▲	Jack Gance	Australia	Chemist Warehouse; retail	73 ▼	1.60 ▲
52 ▲	2.35 ▲	Mario Verrocchi	Australia	Chemist Warehouse	83 ▼	1.50 ▲
53 ▲	2.31 ▲	Shaun Bonétt	Australia	Precision Group; property	61 ▲	1.90 ▲
54 ▲	2.27 ▲	Chris Thomas	Australia	Agriculture	74 ▲	1.60 ▲
55 ▲	2.25 ▲	Chris Ellison	Australia	Resources	64 ▲	1.80 ▲
56 ▼	2.23 ▲	Marcus Besen and family	Australia	Retail	52 ▼	2.20 ▼
57 ▲	2.23 ▲	Sam Arnaout	Australia	Hospitality; property	63 ▲	1.89 ▲
58 ▼	2.14 ▼	Nick Politis	Australia	Retail; property	50 ▲	2.20 ▲
59 ▼	2.13 ▼	Bruce Mathieson	Australia	Gaming; investments	51 ▲	2.20 ▲
60 ▼	2.10 ▼	Sir Michael Hintze	Australia; United Kingdom	Retail; investment	53 ▼	2.20 ▼
61 ▼	2.09 ▲	Gretel Packer	Australia	Crown Resorts; investment	56 ▲	2.00 ▲
62 ▼	2.09 ▼	Ye Lipei	Australia	Property	54 ▼	2.20 ▼
63 ▼	2.08 ▲	Russell Withers and family	Australia	Retail	57 ▼	2.00 ▲
64 ▲	2.02 ▲	Gary Tieck and family^{[note 1]}	Australia	Property; investment	58 ▲	2.00 ▲
65 ▼	2.00	Nigel Austin	Australia	Cotton On Group; retail	59 ▼	2.00 ▲
66 ▼	2.00	Manny Stul and family	Australia	Moose Toys; retail	60 ▼	2.00 ▲
67 ▲	1.97 ▲	John Casella and family	Australia	Agriculture; Casella Family Brands	71 ▼	1.70 ▲
68 ▼	1.94 ▲	Alan Rydge	Australia	Rydges Hotels & Resorts; Event Cinemas	62 ▲	1.90 ▼
69 ▲	1.93 ▲	Tim Roberts	Australia	Ex-Multiplex; investment	75 ▼	1.60 ▲
70 ▼	1.92 ▲	Jonathan Munz and family	Australia	Manufacturing	65 ▼	1.80 ▲
71 ▲	1.91 ▲	Khalil Shahin and family	Australia	Retail	66 ▼	1.80 ▲
72 ▲	1.91 ▲	Sam Chong	Australia	Resources; hotels	127 ▼	1.10 ▼
73 ▲	1.87 ▲	Trevor Lee	Australia	Agriculture	76 ▲	1.60 ▲
74 ▲	1.86 ▲	Paul Salteri and family	Australia	Investment	67 ▼	1.80 ▲
75 ▲	1.85 ▲	Anthony Hall	Australia	Technology	94 ▲	1.40 ▲
76 ▼	1.83 ▲	Paul Little	Australia	Toll Holdings	69 ▼	1.80 ▼
77 ▼	1.82 ▲	Maha Sinnathamby	Australia	Residential property	68 ▲	1.80 ▲
78 ▲	1.79 ▲	Eddie Hirsch	Australia	United Petroleum	77 ▲	1.60 ▲
79 ▲	1.78 ▲	Avi Silver	Australia	United Petroleum	78 ▲	1.60 ▲
80 ▲	1.78 ▲	Paul Lederer	Australia	Ex-Primo smallgoods; investment	95 ▼	1.40 ▲
81 ▲	1.75 ▲	Sam Hupert	Australia	Technology	107 ▲	1.30 ▲
82 ▼	1.70 ▼	David and Vicky Teoh	Australia	Telecommunications	43 ▼	2.60 ▲
83 ▼	1.69	Sam Tarascio	Australia	Property	72 ▲	1.69 ▲
84 ▼	1.62 ▲	Peter Gunn	Australia	Logistics; investment; property	79 ▲	1.60 ▲
85 ▲	1.59 ▲	Sam and Andrew Buckeridge and family	Australia	Buckeridge Group of Companies	89 ▼	1.50 ▼
86 ▼	1.57 ▼	Ralph Sarich	Australia	Investment; property	80 ▲	1.60 ▼
87 ▼	1.57 ▼	Nechama Werdiger and family	Australia	Property	81 ▲	1.60 ▼
88 ▼	1.57 ▲	Imelda Roche^{[note 3]}	Australia	Retail	84 ▼	1.50 ▲
89 ▲	1.56 ▲	Sandy Oatley and family	Australia	Agriculture; property; tourism	114 ▼	1.20 ▲
90 ▲	1.53 ▲	John Borg and Michael Borg	Australia	Manufacturing	n/a	not listed
91 ▼	1.50	Phillip Dong Fang Lee	Australia	Property development	85 ▲	1.50 ▲
92 ▲	1.49 ▲	Nick Andrianakos and family	Australia	Property	122 ▼	1.10 ▲
93 ▼	1.49	John Richards and family	Australia	Waste management	92 ▼	1.49 ▲
94 ▲	1.44 ▲	Chris Morris	Australia	Computershare; financial services; hospitality	102 ▼	1.40 ▼
95 ▲	1.47 ▲	Andy Kennard and family	Australia	Kennards Hire	96 ▲	1.40 ▲
96 ▲	1.46 ▲	Dale Elphinstone	Australia	Elphinstone Group; mining services	97 ▲	1.40 ▲
97 ▼	1.45 ▼	Mark Creasy	Australia	Resources	86 ▲	1.50 ▲
98 ▼	1.45 ▲	Arthur Laundy	Australia	Hotels	93 ▲	1.40
99 ▼	1.43 ▲	Judith Neilson	Australia	Investment	98 ▼	1.40 ▲
100 ▲	1.42 ▲	John Kahlbetzer	Australia	Agriculture	103 ▼	1.40 ▼
101 ▼	1.41 ▼	Alex Waislitz	Australia	Investment	82 ▼	1.51 ▲
102 ▲	1.39 ▲	Justin and Bettina Hemmes and family	Australia	Hotels; property	128 ▼	1.10 ▼
103 ▲	1.35 ▲	Peter Freedman	Australia	Røde Microphones; manufacturing	186 ▲	0.701 ▲
104	1.34 ▼	Robert Millner and family	Australia	Soul Patts; investment	104 ▼	1.40 ▼
105 ▲	1.32 ▲	Robert Bastas	Australia	Retail, manufacturing	138 ▲	0.990 ▲
106 ▲	1.31 ▲	Con Makris and family	Australia	Property	121 ▼	1.20 ▼
107 ▼	1.31 ▲	Nicholas Paspaley and family	Australia	Paspaley Pearls	108 ▼	1.30 ▲
108 ▼	1.30 ▼	Raphael Geminder	Australia	Manufacturing	87 ▲	1.50 ▲
109 ▲	1.28	Ervin Vidor and Charlotte Vidor	Australia	Property; hotels	112 ▼	1.28 ▲
110 ▲	1.27 ▲	Larry Kestelman	Australia	Dodo Services; telecommunications	123 ▼	1.10 ▲
111 ▼	1.26 ▼	Nick Molnar	Australia	Afterpay; technology	90 ▼	1.50 ▼
112 ▼	1.26 ▼	Anthony Eisen	Australia	Afterpay; technology	91 ▼	1.50 ▼
113 ▲	1.26 ▲	Reg and Hazel Rowe	Australia	Super Retail Group; property	115 ▼	1.20 ▲
114 ▲	1.25 ▲	Laurie Sutton	Australia	Retail	143 ▼	0.938 ▼
115 ▲	1.24 ▲	Marnie Lewis-Millar, Shay Lewis-Thorp and family	Australia	Property	139 ▼	0.964 ▲
116 ▼	1.24 ▼	Kerr Neilson	Australia	Financial services	111 ▼	1.30 ▼
117 ▼	1.24 ▲	Dick Honan	Australia	Manildra Group	116 ▼	1.20 ▲
118 ▼	1.24 ▼	Raymond Barro and Rhonda Barro	Australia	Construction	70 ▲	1.80 ▼
119 ▲	1.24 ▲	Jack Zhang	Australia	Financial services; Airwallex	180 ▲	0.732 ▲
120 ▼	1.23 ▲	Lyn Ingham and family	Australia	Ex-Inghams Enterprises; manufacturing	113 ▲	1.20
121 ▼	1.22 ▼	Brian Flannery	Australia	Resources	117 ▲	1.20 ▲
122 ▼	1.22 ▼	Trevor St Baker	Australia	Energy	88 ▲	1.50 ▲
123 ▲	1.20 ▲	Charles Gibbon	Australia	Technology	130 ▲	1.00 ▲
124 ▼	1.15 ▼	Naomi Milgrom	Australia	Sussan; Sportsgirl; Suzanne Grae	118 ▼	1.20 ▲
125 ▼	1.14 ▲	Rod Spooner and family	Australia	Property; Caribbean Gardens	124 ▲	1.10 ▲
126 ▲	1.11 ▲	James Ferguson and Robert Ferguson	Australia	Technology	131 ▲	1.00 ▲
127 ▼	1.10 ▼	Rod Duke	Australia	Briscoe Group	119 ▲	1.20 ▲
128 ▲	1.10 ▲	Robin Khuda	Australia	Technology	189 ▲	0.655 ▲
129 ▼	1.10	Sam Prince	Australia	Zambrero; retail	125 ▲	1.10 ▲
130 ▲	1.09 ▲	Tim Goyder	Australia	Resources	155 ▲	0.848 ▲
131 ▼	1.08	Ryan and Sam Kroonenburg	Australia	Technology	129 ▲	1.08 ▲
132 ▼	1.08 ▼	Will Vicars	Australia	Financial services	109 ▲	1.30 ▲
133 ▼	1.07 ▼	Bruce Gordon	Australia	Media	110 ▲	1.30 ▲
134 ▲	1.06 ▲	Max Beck	Australia	Property	157 ▼	0.825 ▲
135 ▲	1.06 ▲	Nick DiMauro	Australia	Property	132 ▲	1.00 ▲
136 ▲	1.06 ▲	Ian Malouf	Australia	Waste services	167 ▲	0.784 ▲
137 ▲	1.06 ▲	Neville Crichton	Australia	Retail	163 ▼	0.798 ▲
138 ▼	1.05 ▼	Huang Bingwen and family	Australia	Manufacturing	105 ▼	1.40 ▼
139 ▼	1.04 ▼	Peter Scanlon and family	Australia	Patrick Corporation; logistics, investment	126 ▼	1.10 ▲
140 ▼	1.03 ▼	Megan Wynne and Bruce Bellinge	Australia	Human services	99 ▲	1.40 ▲
141 ▼	1.00	Arnold Vitocco	Australia	Property	133 ▼	1.00 ▲
142 ▼	0.995	Spiros Alysandratos	Australia	Travel; property	137 ▼	0.995 ▼
143 ▼	0.990 ▲	Lloyd Williams	Australia	Property; thoroughbreds	141 ▼	0.948 ▲
144 ▲	0.989 ▲	Greg Coffey	United States	Financial services	154 ▲	0.862 ▲
145 ▼	0.972 ▲	Theo Karedis	Australia	Retail; property	140 ▼	0.952 ▲
146 ▲	0.969 ▲	Sunny Ngai and family	Australia	Manufacturing	148 ▼	0.895 ▲
147 ▲	0.966 ▲	Kim Cannon	Australia	Financial services	n/a	not listed
148 ▼	0.950 ▼	Douglas Clarke	Australia	Manufacturing	100 ▲	1.40 ▲
149 ▼	0.950 ▼	Grant Petty	Australia	Manufacturing	101 ▲	1.40 ▲
150 ▼	0.947 ▼	Denis Wagner and family	Australia	Construction; mining services	135 ▼	1.00 ▼
151 ▲	0.943 ▲	Michael Gregg	Australia	Technology	190 ▲	0.648 ▲
152 ▼	0.935	Harry Stamoulis and family	Australia	Manufacturing	144 ▲	0.935 ▲
153 ▲	0.913 ▲	Peter Hughes and family	Australia	Agriculture	164 ▲	0.795 ▲
154 ▲	0.912 ▼	Tim Gurner	Australia	Property	145 ▼	0.929 ▼
155 ▼	0.907 ▲	Shirley Costa and family	Australia	Agriculture	149 ▼	0.889 ▲
156 ▲	0.901	Joy Chambers-Grundy^{[note 1]}	Australia	Media	n/a	not listed
157 ▼	0.900 ▼	Jamuna Gurung and Shesh Ghale	Australia	Melbourne Institute of Technology	136 ▼	1.00 ▼
158 ▼	0.885 ▼	Neil Rae and family	Australia	Ex-Gull Petroleum	150 ▼	0.888 ▲
159 ▼	0.885 ▼	Andrew Roberts	Australia	Ex-Multiplex; property	134 ▼	1.00 ▲
160 ▼	0.875 ▼	Robert Whyte	Australia	Investment	146 ▼	0.925 ▲
161 ▼	0.862 ▼	Tony Walls	Australia	Technology	120 ▲	1.20 ▲
162 ▼	0.860 ▲	Mick Power	Australia	Investment	179 ▼	0.740 ▲
163 ▼	0.856 ▲	Tania Austin	Australia	Retail	159 ▲	0.814 ▲
164 ▼	0.852 ▼	Roy Medich	Australia	Property	152 ▲	0.878 ▲
165 ▼	0.850 ▼	Gordon Fu and family	Australia	Property	142 ▼	0.945 ▼
166 ▼	0.844 ▲	Allan Myers	Australia	Investment; agriculture	151 ▼	0.883 ▲
167 ▲	0.832 ▲	Diane Burger and family	Australia	Property	158 ▼	0.818 ▲
168 ▼	0.828 ▲	Richard Smith	Australia	Food services	165 ▼	0.790 ▲
169 ▲	0.823 ▲	Michael Boyd	Australia	Sonic Healthcare	178 ▼	0.744 ▲
170 ▼	0.822 ▲	Don McDonald and family	Australia	Agriculture	160 ▼	0.813 ▲
171 ▼	0.820 ▲	John Singleton	Australia	Media; investment; property	170 ▼	0.768 ▲
172 ▼	0.804 ▲	George Kepper	Australia	Technology; property	168 ▼	0.781 ▲
173 ▲	0.800 ▲	Zareh Nalbandian	Australia	Entertainment	n/a	not listed
174 ▼	0.799 ▼	Cyan and Collis Ta'eed and family	Australia	Technology	147 ▼	0.913 ▲
175 ▼	0.785 ▲	Paul Fudge	Australia	Resources	169 ▼	0.769 ▲
176 ▲	0.780 ▲	Andrew and Michael Buxton	Australia	Property	172 ▼	0.764 ▲
177 ▼	0.780 ▼	John Symond	Australia	Ex-Aussie Home Loans	162 ▼	0.800
178 ▼	0.778 ▲	Joanna Horgan and Peter Wetenhall	Australia	Retail	182 ▲	0.725 ▲
179 ▼	0.788 ▼	George Koukis	Switzerland	Software	166 ▼	0.788 ▲
180 ▼	0.766 ▲	David Tudehope and Aiden Tudehope	Australia	Macquarie Telecom	156 ▲	0.842 ▲
181 ▼	0.763 ▼	Kerry Harmanis	Australia	Resources	171 ▼	0.766 ▲
182 ▼	0.755 ▼	Tony Denny	Australia	Retail; property	175 ▼	0.749
183 ▲	0.755	Maree Isaacs	Australia	Technology	n/a	not listed
184 ▲	0.748	Peter Barber	Australia	Manufacturing	n/a	not listed
185 ▼	0.747 ▼	Christian Beck	Australia	Technology	153 ▼	0.869 ▼
186 ▼	0.740 ▲	Tony Tarak and family	Australia	Services	181 ▼	0.727 ▲
187 ▼	0.734 ▼	Rhonda Wyllie and family	Australia	Investment	173 ▼	0.758 ▲
188 ▼	0.734 ▼	John Higgins	Australia	Investment; services	174 ▼	0.750 ▲
189 ▼	0.730 ▲	Zig Inge and family	Australia	Property	183 ▼	0.714 ▲
190 ▼	0.729 ▼	Kim McKendrick and family	Australia	Ex-Godfrey Hirst Carpets	177 ▼	0.746 ▲
191 ▼	0.721 ▼	Kevin Seymour and family	Australia	Property	176 ▼	0.747 ▼
192 ▼	0.721 ▲	Terry Peabody	Australia	Ex-Transpacific; investment	188 ▼	0.698 ▼
193 ▼	0.718 ▼	Shangjin Lin and family, Yunhui Lin	Australia	Property	161 ▼	0.807 ▼
194 ▼	0.710 ▲	Peter Cooper	Australia	Financial services	185 ▲	0.703 ▼
195 ▼	0.710	Robert Magid	Australia	Property	184 ▼	0.710 ▲
196 ▼	0.700	Garry Rothwell	Australia	Property	187 ▼	0.700 ▲
197 ▲	0.700 ▲	John Winning	Australia	Retail	n/a	not listed
198 ▲	0.695 ▲	Nicole Kidman and Keith Urban^{[note 1]}	Australia	Entertainment	n/a	not listed
199 ▲	0.693 ▲	Gerry Ryan	Australia	Manufacturing	n/a	not listed
200 ▲	0.690 ▲	Bob Rose and Margaret Rose and family^{[note 1]}	Australia	Property	n/a	not listed

== Removed from the 2023 list ==
The following individuals, who appeared on the Financial Review Rich List 2022, did not appear on the 2023 list

== Notes ==
- ^1: Individual was listed on a previous year's list, that was not the 2022 Rich List.
- ^2: Previous years' listing was in the name of David Hains. Hains died on 22 January 2023.
- ^3: Previous years' listing was in the joint names of Bill and Imelda Roche. Bill Roche died on 30 June 2022.

== See also ==
- Financial Review Rich List
- Forbes Asia list of Australians by net worth
