= Financial Review Rich List 2021 =

Annual list of wealthiest Australians

The Financial Review Rich List 2021 is the 38th annual survey of the 200 wealthiest people resident in Australia, published by the Australian Financial Review on 27 May 2021.

The net worth of the wealthiest individual, Gina Rinehart, was $31.06 billion; while the net worth of the 200th wealthiest individual, Douglas Clarke, was {$590 million; up from $540 million for the 200th individual in 2020. The combined wealth of the 200 individuals was calculated as $479.6 bn, an increase of $55.6 bn on the previous year; compared with a combined wealth of $6.4 bn in 1984 when the BRW Rich 200 commenced. Thirty-nine women were included on the 2021 Rich List, representing 19.5 percent of the list; up from thirty women in 2020, or 12 percent. The list included eighteen debutants.

Rinehart held the mantle of Australia's wealthiest individual between 2011 and 2015; and was also the wealthiest Australian individual in 2020. From 2017 to 2019, Anthony Pratt was Australia's wealthiest individual, ranked fourth in the 2021 Rich List, after Andrew Forrest, Australia's wealthiest individual in 2008, and Mike Cannon-Brookes. Harry Triguboff was Australia's wealthiest individual in 2016, ranked sixth in the 2021 Rich List.

== List of individuals ==
2021		Name	Citizenship	Source of wealth	2020	
Rank	Net worth A$ bn	Name	Citizenship	Source of wealth	Rank	Net worth A$ bn
1	31.06 ▲	Gina Rinehart	Australia	Hancock Prospecting; investment	1 ▲	28.89 ▲
2	27.25 ▲	Andrew Forrest	Australia	Fortescue	2 ▲	23.00 ▲
3 ▲	20.18 ▲	Mike Cannon-Brookes	Australia	Atlassian	5 ▲	16.93 ▲
4 ▼	20.09 ▲	Anthony Pratt and family	Australia	Visy; Pratt Industries	3 ▼	19.75 ▲
5 ▲	20.00 ▲	Scott Farquhar	Australia	Atlassian	6 ▼	16.69 ▲
6 ▲	17.27 ▲	Harry Triguboff	Australia	Meriton	7 ▼	14.42 ▲
7 ▲	13.01 ▲	Clive Palmer	Australia	Mineralogy and other mining interests; hospitality	8 ▲	9.18 ▲
8 ▼	11.70 ▼	Hui Wing Mau	China; Australia	Shimao Property	4	18.06 ▲
9	8.51 ▲	Sir Frank Lowy	Australia	ex-Westfield; property	9 ▼	8.30 ▼
10 ▲	7.98 ▲	Melanie Perkins and Cliff Obrecht	Australia	Canva	26 ▲	3.43 ▲
11 ▲	7.86 ▲	Alan Wilson and family	Australia	Reece Group	12 ▲	4.93 ▲
12 ▲	7.39 ▲	Ivan Glasenberg	Australia; South Africa; Switzerland	Glencore commodities trading	16 ▼	4.54 ▼
13 ▼	7.18 ▲	Kerry Stokes	Australia	Property; Seven West Media; resources	10 ▲	6.26 ▲
14 ▼	5.80 ▲	John Gandel	Australia	Property (shopping centres)	11 ▼	5.45 ▼
15 ▼	5.72 ▲	James Packer	Australia	Crown Resorts; Consolidated Media Holdings	13	4.69 ▼
16 ▲	5.04 ▲	Len Ainsworth and family	Australia	Gaming; manufacturing	18 ▼	4.42 ▲
17	4.94 ▲	Jack Cowin	Australia	Competitive Foods Australia; investment	17 ▲	4.51 ▲
18 ▼	4.76 ▲	Vivek Chaand Sehgal	Australia	Motherson Sumi Systems	14 ▼	4.63 ▼
19 ▲	4.70 ▲	Richard White	Australia	Technology	20	4.10 ▲
20 ▼	4.57 ▼	Chau Chak Wing	Australia	Property; investments	15 ▲	4.60 ▲
21 ▼	4.48 ▲	Lang Walker	Australia	Walker Corporation (property)	19 ▼	4.27 ▼
22	4.43 ▲	Lachlan Murdoch	United States; United Kingdom; Australia	Media	22 ▼	3.76 ▲
23 ▲	4.37 ▲	Solomon Lew	Australia	Premier Investments; retail	24	3.72 ▲
24 ▼	4.13 ▲	Angela Bennett	Australia	Mining	21 ▲	3.83 ▲
25 ▼	4.01 ▲	Lindsay Fox	Australia	Linfox; property	23 ▼	3.72 ▲
26 ▲	3.96 ▲	Andrew Budzinski	Cyprus	IC Markets; financial services	58 ▲	1.67 ▲
27 ▼	3.96 ▲	Alexandra Burt and Leonie Baldock	Australia	Resources	25 ▲	3.62 ▲
28 ▲	3.20 ▲	Gerry Harvey and Katie Page	Australia	Harvey Norman	31 ▲	2.57 ▲
29 ▲	3.19 ▲	Morry Fraid, Zac Fried and family	Australia	Retail; property	72 ▼	1.41 ▼
30 ▲	2.99 ▲	Greg Goodman and family	Australia	Goodman Group; property	46 ▲	2.02 ▲
31 ▼	2.89 ▼	David Hains	Australia	Investment	28 ▼	2.93 ▲
32 ▲	2.80 ▲	Prudence MacLeod	Australia	News Corporation and News UK	36 ▼	2.24 ▼
33 ▲	2.79 ▲	Michael Heine and family	Australia	Financial services	53 ▲	1.83 ▲
34 ▲	2.69 ▲	Tony Perich and family	Australia	Agriculture; property	43 ▼	2.05
35 ▲	2.68 ▲	Laurence Escalante	Australia	Gaming	n/a	not listed
36 ▲	2.67 ▲	Nick Molnar	Australia	Afterpay; technology	50 ▲	1.86 ▲
37 ▼	2.66 ▼	Betty Klimenko, Monica Weinberg-Saunders and family	Australia	Property	29 ▲	2.73 ▲
38 ▲	2.66 ▲	Anthony Eisen	Australia	Afterpay; technology	51 ▲	1.86 ▲
39 ▼	2.65 ▲	Brett Blundy	Australia	Retail; property; agriculture	37 ▼	2.20 ▲
40 ▼	2.55 ▲	David and Vicky Teoh	Australia	Telecommunications	32 ▲	2.54 ▲
41 ▲	2.53 ▲	Kie Chie Wong, Ann Lim and family	Malaysia	Investor; resources	44 ▲	2.04 ▲
42 ▼	2.53 ▼	Terry Snow	Australia	Capital Airport Group; property	27 ▲	3.19 ▲
43 ▲	2.49 ▲	John Van Lieshout	Australia	Retail	45 ▼	2.03 ▼
44 ▼	2.40 ▲	John Hancock	Australia	Hancock Prospecting	40 ▲	2.05 ▲
45 ▼	2.34 ▲	Michael Hodgson	Australia	Property	33	2.33 ▼
46 ▼	2.32 ▲	Maurice Alter and family	Australia	Retail	34 ▲	2.31 ▼
47 ▼	2.31 ▲	Bianca Rinehart	Australia	Hancock Prospecting	39 ▼	2.05 ▼
48 ▼	2.31 ▲	Ginia Rinehart	Australia	Hancock Prospecting	42 ▲	2.05 ▲
49 ▼	2.31 ▲	Hope Welker	Australia	Hancock Prospecting	41 ▲	2.05 ▲
50 ▲	2.30 ▲	Gretel Packer	Australia	Crown Resorts; investment	56 ▲	1.77 ▲
51 ▲	2.26 ▲	Cameron Adams	Australia	Canva	104 ▲	1.00 ▲
52 ▼	2.21 ▼	Sir Michael Hintze GCSG, AM	Australia; United Kingdom	Retail; investment	30 ▼	2.60 ▼
53 ▼	2.05 ▼	Marcus Besen and family	Australia	Retail	35 ▼	2.24 ▼
54 ▲	2.02 ▲	Nick Politis	Australia	Retail; property	79 ▼	1.31 ▲
55 ▼	1.98	Bob Ell	Australia	Property	47 ▼	1.98 ▲
56 ▲	1.98 ▲	Gary Tieck and family^{[note 1]}	Australia	Property; investment	n/a	not listed
57 ▼	1.93 ▲	Nigel Austin	Australia	Cotton On Group; retail	49 ▼	1.92 ▼
58 ▼	1.90 ▲	Russell Withers and family	Australia	Retail	55 ▲	1.79 ▲
59 ▼	1.85 ▼	Ye Lipei	Australia	Property	48 ▼	1.95 ▼
60 ▲	1.82 ▲	Jack Gance	Australia	Chemist Warehouse; retail	93 ▼	1.10 ▲
61 ▲	1.81 ▲	Bruce Mathieson	Australia	Gaming; investments	63 ▲	1.54 ▲
62 ▼	1.79 ▲	Jonathan Munz and family	Australia	Manufacturing	60 ▼	1.59 ▲
63 ▲	1.79 ▲	Mario Verrocchi	Australia	Chemist Warehouse	98 ▼	1.06 ▲
64 ▲	1.78 ▲	Maha Sinnathamby	Australia	Residential property	76 ▼	1.35 ▲
65 ▼	1.76 ▼	Sam and Andrew Buckeridge and family	Australia	Buckeridge Group of Companies	54 ▼	1.79 ▼
66 ▲	1.72 ▲	Paul Salteri and family	Australia	Investment	57 ▼	1.69 ▲
67 ▼	1.71 ▲	Paul Little	Australia	Toll Holdings	59 ▼	1.67 ▼
68 ▼	1.63 ▲	John Casella and family	Australia	Agriculture	62 ▼	1.57 ▲
69 ▲	1.60 ▲	Manny Stul and family	Australia	Moose Toys; retail	119 ▼	0.835 ▼
70 ▼	1.58 ▼	Tim Roberts	Australia	Ex-Multiplex; investment	52 ▼	1.86 ▼
71 ▼	1.55 ▲	Judith Neilson	Australia	Investment	69 ▼	1.44 ▲
72 ▲	1.55 ▲	Alan Rydge	Australia	Rydges Hotels & Resorts; Event Cinemas	80 ▼	1.30 ▼
73	1.55 ▲	Kerr Neilson	Australia	Financial services	73 ▼	1.38 ▼
74 ▲	1.54 ▲	Robert Millner and family	Australia	Soul Patts; investment	89 ▼	1.16 ▼
75 ▼	1.54 ▲	Sam Tarascio	Australia	Property	64 ▼	1.53 ▼
76 ▼	1.53 ▼	Khalil Shahin and family	Australia	Retail	61 ▼	1.58 ▲
77 ▼	1.50 ▲	Alex Waislitz	Australia	Investment	65 ▼	1.49 ▼
78 ▼	1.45 ▲	Chris Wallin	Australia	QCoal; resources	70 ▼	1.43 ▼
79 ▼	1.44 ▲	Peter Gunn	Australia	Logistics; investment; property	71 ▲	1.42 ▲
80 ▼	1.44 ▼	Raymond Barro and family	Australia	Construction	66 ▲	1.48 ▲
81 ▼	1.44 ▲	Eddie Hirsch	Australia	United Petroleum	77 ▲	1.32 ▲
82 ▼	1.42 ▲	Avi Silver	Australia	United Petroleum	78 ▲	1.32 ▲
83 ▼	1.39 ▲	Paul Lederer	Australia	Ex-Primo smallgoods; investment	75 ▼	1.36 ▲
84 ▲	1.36 ▲	Anthony Hall	Australia	Technology	122 ▲	0.820 ▲
85 ▼	1.35 ▼	Chris Thomas	Australia	Agriculture	74 ▼	1.37 ▼
86 ▲	1.32 ▲	Sam Hupert	Australia	Technology	134 ▲	0.761 ▲
87 ▲	1.29 ▲	Chris Ellison	Australia	Resources	103 ▲	1.00 ▲
88 ▲	1.27 ▲	Arthur Laundy	Australia	Hotels	181 ▼	0.584
89 ▲	1.27 ▲	John Richards and family	Australia	Waste management	86 ▲	1.19 ▲
90 ▼	1.27 ▲	Raphael Geminder	Australia	Manufacturing	97 ▲	1.06 ▲
91 ▼	1.26 ▲	Con Makris and family	Australia	Property	82 ▼	1.25 ▼
92 ▼	1.26 ▲	Nicholas Paspaley and family	Australia	Paspaley Pearls	83	1.25 ▲
93 ▼	1.24 ▼	Chris Mackay	Australia	Financial services	68 ▲	1.46 ▲
94 ▼	1.23 ▼	Hamish Douglass	Australia	Financial services	67 ▲	1.47 ▲
95 ▼	1.22 ▲	Bill Roche and Imelda Roche	Australia	Retail	84 ▼	1.21 ▼
96 ▼	1.21 ▲	Nechama Werdiger and family	Australia	Property	85 ▼	1.20 ▼
97 ▲	1.21 ▲	Justin Hemmes	Australia	Hotels; property	101 ▼	1.00 ▼
98 ▼	1.19 ▲	Reg and Hazel Rowe	Australia	Super Retail Group; property	88 ▼	1.17 ▲
99 ▼	1.18 ▲	Lyn Ingham and family	Australia	Ex-Inghams Enterprises; manufacturing	87 ▼	1.17
100 ▼	1.18 ▼	Huang Bingwen and family	Australia	Manufacturing	81 ▼	1.28 ▼
101 ▼	1.17 ▲	Shaun Bonétt	Australia	Precision Group; property	99 ▼	1.06 ▲
102 ▼	1.17 ▲	Trevor Lee	Australia	Agriculture	100 ▲	1.02 ▲
103 ▼	1.16 ▲	Sandy Oatley and family	Australia	Agriculture; property; tourism	90 ▼	1.13 ▲
104 ▲	1.16 ▲	Sam Kennard and family	Australia	Kennards Self Storage	n/a	not listed
105 ▼	1.15 ▲	John Kahlbetzer	Australia	Agriculture	92 ▼	1.10 ▼
106 ▼	1.13 ▲	Sam Chong	Australia	Resources; hotels	91 ▼	1.12 ▼
107 ▼	1.10 ▲	Ralph Sarich	Australia	Investment; property	94 ▼	1.08 ▼
108 ▼	1.09 ▲	Denis Wagner and family	Australia	Construction; mining services	102 ▼	1.00 ▼
109 ▼	1.06 ▼	Dale Elphinstone	Australia	Elphinstone Group; mining services	96 ▲	1.08 ▲
110 ▼	1.06 ▼	Dick Honan	Australia	Manildra Group	95 ▲	1.08 ▲
111 ▼	1.01 ▲	Jamuna Gurung and Shesh Ghale	Australia	Melbourne Institute of Technology	105 ▼	0.994 ▼
112 ▼	0.997 ▲	Gordon Fu and family	Australia	Property	106 ▼	0.992 ▼
113 ▼	0.995 ▲	Peter Scanlon and family	Australia	Patrick Corporation	107 ▼	0.983 ▲
114 ▲	0.939 ▲	Andy Kennard and family	Australia	Kennards Hire	n/a	not listed
115 ▲	0.933 ▲	Naomi Milgrom	Australia	Sussan; Sportsgirl; Suzanne Grae	125 ▼	0.795 ▲
116 ▼	0.925 ▲	Chris Morris	Australia	Computershare; financial services; hospitality	108 ▼	0.922 ▼
117 ▼	0.907 ▲	Rod Spooner and family	Australia	Property	109 ▲	0.904 ▲
118 ▼	0.904 ▲	Ervin Vidor and Charlotte Vidor	Australia	Property; hotels	115 ▼	0.866 ▼
119 ▼	0.903 ▲	Lloyd Williams	Australia	Property; thoroughbreds	110 ▼	0.896 ▼
120 ▼	0.902 ▲	Laurie Sutton	Australia	Retail	113 ▼	0.884 ▼
121 ▼	0.874 ▲	Marnie Lewis-Millar, Shay Lewis-Thorp and family	Australia	Property	120 ▼	0.834 ▼
122 ▼	0.871	Joy Chambers-Grundy	Australia	Media	114 ▼	0.871
123 ▼	0.870 ▼	Bruce Gordon	Australia	Media	111 ▲	0.892 ▲
124 ▼	0.869 ▲	Rod Duke	Australia	Briscoe Group	123 ▲	0.802 ▲
125 ▲	0.867 ▲	Will Vicars	Australia	Financial services	176 ▲	0.608 ▲
126 ▲	0.858 ▲	Nick Andrianakos and family	Australia	Property	n/a	not listed
127 ▼	0.857 ▲	Mark Creasy	Australia	Resources	116 ▲	0.853 ▲
128	0.844 ▲	Tony Walls	Australia	Technology	128 ▲	0.783 ▲
129 ▼	0.843 ▲	Shangjin Lin and family, Yunhui Lin	Australia	Property	117 ▼	0.839 ▼
130 ▼	0.837 ▲	Andrew Roberts	Australia	Ex-Multiplex; property	121 ▼	0.827 ▼
131 ▼	0.834 ▲	Allan Myers	Australia	Investment; agriculture	127 ▼	0.791 ▲
132 ▼	0.827 ▲	Spiros Alysandratos	Australia	Travel; property	124 ▼	0.798 ▼
133 ▼	0.825 ▲	Theo Karedis	Australia	Retail; property	131 ▼	0.775 ▼
134 ▲	0.820 ▲	Roy Medich	Australia	Property	n/a	not listed
135 ▼	0.800 ▼	John Symond	Australia	Ex-Aussie Home Loans	112 ▼	0.891 ▲
136 ▼	0.790 ▼	Harry Stamoulis and family	Australia	Manufacturing	126 ▼	0.793 ▲
137 ▼	0.787 ▲	Cyan and Collis Ta'eed and family	Australia	Technology	130 ▼	0.777 ▼
138 ▼	0.786 ▲	Shirley Costa and family^{[note 2]}	Australia	Agriculture	132 ▼	0.770 ▼
139 ▼	0.785 ▲	Larry Kestelman	Australia	Dodo Services; telecommunications	135 ▼	0.760 ▼
140 ▼	0.770 ▲	Peter Cooper	Australia	Financial services	137 ▲	0.754 ▲
141 ▼	0.763 ▲	Arnold Vitocco	Australia	Property	136 ▼	0.758 ▲
142 ▲	0.748 ▲	Nick DiMauro	Australia	Property	144 ▲	0.721 ▲
143 ▼	0.745 ▲	Brian Flannery	Australia	Resources	138 ▼	0.740 ▼
144 ▼	0.737 ▲	Neil Rae and family	Australia	Ex-Gull Petroleum	139 ▼	0.733 ▲
145 ▼	0.736 ▲	Robert Whyte	Australia	Investment	141 ▲	0.731 ▲
146 ▼	0.735 ▲	Jonathan Hallinan	Australia	Property	145 ▼	0.720 ▼
147 ▼	0.731 ▲	John Singleton	Australia	Media; investment; property	142 ▲	0.728 ▲
148 ▼	0.729 ▲	Ian Malouf	Australia	Waste services	147 ▲	0.703 ▲
149	0.727 ▲	Trevor St Baker	Australia	Energy	149 ▲	0.699 ▲
150 ▼	0.725 ▼	Travers Duncan	Australia	Resources; property	140 ▼	0.732 ▲
151 ▲	0.724 ▲	David Dicker	Australia	Technology	n/a	not listed
152 ▲	0.723 ▲	Sunny Ngai and family	Australia	Manufacturing	197 ▼	0.547 ▼
153 ▲	0.721 ▲	Tania Austin	Australia	Retail	n/a	not listed
154 ▲	0.710 ▲	Kevin Seymour and family	Australia	Property	163 ▼	0.662 ▼
155 ▼	0.706 ▲	Peter Hughes and family	Australia	Agriculture	151 ▲	0.694 ▲
156 ▼	0.705 ▼	George Koukis	Switzerland	Software	146 ▲	0.715 ▲
157 ▼	0.704 ▲	Richard Smith	Australia	Food services	148 ▼	0.702 ▼
158 ▲	0.700 ▲	Garry Rothwell	Australia	Property	175 ▼	0.611 ▼
159 ▼	0.697 ▲	Ori Allon	United States	Technology	150 ▼	0.695 ▲
160 ▼	0.693 ▲	Greg Poche	Australia	Ex-StarTrack	155 ▲	0.687 ▲
161 ▼	0.692 ▲	Kerry Harmanis	Australia	Resources	154 ▼	0.690 ▲
162 ▲	0.688 ▲	Robyn Denholm	Australia	Technology	n/a	not listed
163 ▼	0.687 ▼	Michael Boyd	Australia	Sonic Healthcare	152 ▲	0.693 ▲
164 ▼	0.681 ▼	Christian Beck	Australia	Technology	153 ▼	0.691 ▼
165 ▲	0.679 ▲	Tony Tartak and family^{[note 1]}	Australia	Waste; Bingo Industries	n/a	not listed
166 ▲	0.677 ▲	Owen Kerr	Australia	Financial services	173 ▲	0.617 ▲
167 ▼	0.676 ▼	Kim McKendrick and family	Australia	Ex-Godfrey Hirst Carpets	158 ▼	0.683 ▲
168 ▼	0.672 ▼	Paul Fudge	Australia	Media	157 ▼	0.684 ▲
169 ▼	0.670 ▲	Diane Burger and family	Australia	Property	160 ▼	0.667 ▲
170 ▼	0.668 ▲	Greg Coffey	United States	Financial services	164 ▲	0.655 ▲
171 ▼	0.665 ▼	George Kepper	Australia	Technology; property	156 ▲	0.684 ▲
172 ▼	0.664 ▼	Max Beck	Australia	Property	161 ▼	0.665 ▼
173 ▼	0.663 ▲	Don McDonald and family	Australia	Financial services	169 ▲	0.639 ▲
174 ▲	0.658 ▲	Joanna Horgan and Peter Wetenhall	Australia	Retail	n/a	not listed
175 ▼	0.657 ▲	Zig Inge and family	Australia	Property	166 ▼	0.645 ▲
176 ▲	0.655 ▲	Megan Wynne and Bruce Bellinge	Australia	Human services	n/a	not listed
177 ▼	0.652 ▲	Andrew and Michael Buxton	Australia	Property	165 ▼	0.646 ▼
178 ▼	0.650 ▲	Rhonda Wyllie and family	Australia	Investment	171 ▼	0.632 ▲
179 ▼	0.648 ▼	Robert Magid	Australia	Property	162 ▼	0.664 ▼
180 ▼	0.647 ▲	Terry Peabody	Australia	Ex-Transpacific; investment	167 ▼	0.644 ▼
181 ▲	0.646 ▲	David Tudehope and Aiden Tudehope	Australia	Macquarie Telecom	n/a	not listed
182 ▼	0.639 ▲	Jack Bendat	Australia	Property	170 ▼	0.634 ▼
183 ▲	0.632 ▲	Fiona Tudor Brown	Australia	Technology	n/a	not listed
184 ▼	0.631 ▲	John Higgins	Australia	Investment; services	172 ▼	0.629 ▲
185 ▼	0.627 ▲	David Paradice	United States	Financial services	174 ▼	0.613 ▲
186 ▲	0.626 ▲	Tah-nee and Simon Beard	Australia	Retail	n/a	not listed
187 ▼	0.611 ▼	Barry Lambert and family	Australia	Financial services	168 ▲	0.643 ▲
188 ▼	0.610 ▲	Zeljko Ranogajec	Isle of Man	Gaming	179 ▼	0.600
189 ▼	0.609 ▲	Tim Gurner	Australia	Property	185 ▼	0.581 ▼
190 ▼	0.607 ▲	Bob Rose	Australia	Property	177 ▲	0.605 ▲
191 ▲	0.605 ▲	Neville Bertalli^{[note 1]}	Australia	Retail	n/a	not listed
192 ▲	0.600 ▲	Robin Khuda	Australia	Technology	n/a	not listed
193 ▲	0.598 ▲	Larry Diamond	Australia	Zip Co; technology	194 ▲	0.552 ▲
194 ▼	0.597 ▲	Charles Gibbon	Australia	Technology	183 ▲	0.587 ▲
195 ▼	0.596 ▲	Paul Blackburne	Australia	Property	187 ▼	0.579 ▲
196 ▼	0.695 ▲	Jina Chen and Alex Wu	Australia	Healthcare	159 ▼	0.680 ▼
197 ▼	0.594	Judy Brinsmead	Australia	Construction	180 ▲	0.594 ▲
198 ▲	0.593 ▲	Wes Maas	Australia	Construction	n/a	not listed
199 ▲	0.592 ▲	Grant Petty	Australia	Manufacturing	n/a	not listed
200 ▲	0.590 ▲	Douglas Clarke	Australia	Manufacturing	n/a	not listed

Legend
Icon	Description
Steady	Has not changed from the previous year's list
▲	Has increased from the previous year's list
▼	Has decreased from the previous year's list

== Removed from the 2021 list ==
The following individuals, who appeared on the Financial Review Rich List 2020, did not appear on the 2021 list:

2020		Name	Citizenship	Source of wealth	Reason (other than financial)
Rank	Net worth A$ bn	Name	Citizenship	Source of wealth	Reason (other than financial)
38 ▲	2.13 ▲	Peter, Andrew and Lex Greensill	Australia; United Kingdom	Financial services; agriculture	Greensill scandal
118 ▲	0.817 ▲	Eddie Machaalani	Australia	Technology	
129 ▲	0.780 ▲	Mitchell Harper	Australia	Technology	
133 ▲	0.764 ▲	Diana and Rino Grollo	Australia	Property	Parts of Grocon were placed in administration in November 2020
143 ▼	0.724 ▼	Paul Baiada and family	Australia	Manufacturing; food production	
178 ▼	0.601 ▼	Leon Kamenev	Australia	Ex-Menulog; technology	
182 ▲	0.588 ▲	Gary Johnston	Australia	Jaycar; retail	
184 ▲	0.585 ▲	Tony Haggarty	Australia	Mining	
186 ▲	0.580 ▲	Jiwan and Suman Mohan	Australia	Agriculture	
188 ▲	0.575 ▲	Ruslan Kogan	Australia	Kogan.com; technology	
189 ▲	0.569 ▲	Geoff Lord	Australia	Resources	
190 ▲	0.564 ▲	Bevan Slattery	Australia	Technology	
191 ▼	0.560 ▲	Tony Poli	Australia	Resources; property	
192 ▼	0.556 ▼	Gordon Martin	Australia	Manufacturing	
193 ▼	0.554 ▼	Grahame Mapp	Australia	Investment	
195 ▲	0.550 ▲	Cathie Reid and Stuart Giles	Australia	Helathcare	
196 ▼	0.549 ▲	Andrew Abercrombie	Australia	Financial services	
198 ▼	0.546 ▼	Danny Hill	Monaco	Property	
199 ▼	0.545 ▼	Scott Hutchinson and family	Australia	Construction	
200 ▼	0.540 ▼	Nigel Satterley	Australia	Satterley; property	

== Notes ==
- ^1: Individual was listed on a previous year's list, that was not the 2020 Rich List.
- ^2: Previous years' listing was in the name of Frank Costa who died on 2 May 2021.

== See also ==
- Financial Review Rich List
- Forbes Asia list of Australians by net worth
