= Financial Review Rich List 2024 =

Annual list of wealthiest Australians

The Financial Review Rich List 2024 is the 41st annual survey of the 200 wealthiest people resident in Australia, published by the Australian Financial Review on 30 May 2024.

The net worth of the wealthiest individual, Gina Rinehart, was $40.61 billion; while the net worth of the 200th wealthiest individual, Christian Beck, was $718 million; up from $690 million for the 200th individual in 2023. The combined wealth of the 200 individuals was calculated as $624.9 bn, an increase of $61.9 bn on the previous year; compared with a combined wealth of $6.4 bn in 1984 when the BRW Rich 200 commenced. Forty-one women were included on the 2024 Rich List, representing 20.5 per cent of the list; down from thirty-six women in 2023, or 18 per cent. The list included eleven debutants.

Rinehart held the mantle of Australia's wealthiest individual between 2011 and 2015; and has been the wealthiest Australian individual since 2020. From 2017 to 2019, Anthony Pratt was Australia's wealthiest individual, ranked fourth in the 2021 Rich List, after Andrew Forrest, Australia's wealthiest individual in 2008, and Mike Cannon-Brookes. Harry Triguboff was Australia's wealthiest individual in 2016, ranked second in the 2024 Rich List.

== List of individuals ==
2024		Name	Citizenship	Source of wealth	2023	
Rank	Net worth A$ bn	Name	Citizenship	Source of wealth	Rank	Net worth A$ bn
1	40.61 ▲	Gina Rinehart	Australia	Hancock Prospecting; investment	1	37.41 ▲
2 ▲	26.49 ▲	Harry Triguboff	Australia	Meriton	4 ▲	23.80 ▲
3 ▲	24.38 ▲	Mike Cannon-Brookes and Annie Cannon-Brookes	Australia	Atlassian	6 ▼	19.01 ▼
4 ▼	23.30 ▼	Anthony Pratt and family	Australia	Visy; Pratt Industries	3 ▲	24.30
5 ▲	22.88 ▲	Scott Farquhar	Australia	Atlassian	7 ▼	18.16 ▼
6 ▼	22.75 ▼	Clive Palmer	Australia	Mineralogy and other mining interests; hospitality	5 ▲	23.66 ▲
7	16.92 ▲	Nicola Forrest	Australia	Fortescue	n/a	not listed
8 ▼	16.76 ▼	Andrew Forrest	Australia	Fortescue	2	33.29 ▲
9 ▼	14.86 ▲	Ivan Glasenberg	Australia; South Africa; Switzerland	Glencore commodities trading	8 ▲	13.60 ▲
10 ▼	13.62 ▲	Melanie Perkins and Cliff Obrecht	Australia	Canva	9 ▼	13.18 ▼
11	11.63 ▲	Richard White	Australia	WiseTech Global; Technology	11 ▲	9.11 ▲
12	11.30	Kerry Stokes	Australia	Property; Seven West Media; resources	12	7.45 ▲
13 ▲	10.64 ▲	Alan Wilson and family	Australia	Reece Group	14	6.51 ▼
14 ▼	9.33	Sir Frank Lowy	Australia	ex-Westfield; property	10	9.33 ▲
15 ▲	8.16 ▲	Vivek Chaand Sehgal	Australia	Motherson Sumi Systems	24 ▼	4.20 ▼
16 ▼	6.94 ▲	John Gandel	Australia	Property (shopping centres)	15 ▲	6.33 ▲
17 ▼	6.81 ▲	Cameron Adams	Australia	Canva	13 ▲	6.59 ▼
18 ▲	6.08 ▲	Suzanne Walker and family ^{[note 2]}	Australia	Walker Corporation (property)	16 ▲	5.81 ▲
19 ▼	5.85 ▲	Len Ainsworth and family	Australia	ex-Aristocrat Leisure; Gaming; manufacturing	17 ▲	5.22 ▼
20 ▼	5.69 ▲	James Packer	Australia	ex-Crown Resorts; ex-Consolidated Media Holdings	18 ▼	4.95 ▼
21 ▲	5.69 ▲	Lindsay Fox	Australia	Linfox; property	23 ▲	4.35 ▲
22 ▼	5.04 ▲	Angela Bennett	Australia	Mining	20 ▼	4.63 ▼
23 ▼	4.88 ▲	Jack Cowin	Australia	Competitive Foods Australia; investment	22 ▼	4.36 ▼
24 ▲	4.72 ▲	Solomon Lew	Australia	Premier Investments; retail	25	3.97 ▼
25 ▲	4.62 ▲	Morry Fraid, Zac Fried and family	Australia	Retail; property	26 ▲	3.95 ▲
26 ▲	4.51 ▲	Ed Craven	Australia	Gaming	35 ▲	3.11 ▲
27 ▲	4.32 ▲	Greg Goodman and family	Australia	Goodman Group; property	30	3.71 ▲
28 ▲	4.20 ▼	Chau Chak Wing	Australia	Property; investments	21 ▼	4.43 ▼
29 ▲	4.13 ▲	Alexandra Burt and Leonie Baldock	Australia	Resources	29 ▼	3.85 ▼
30 ▼	4.09 ▲	Terry Snow and family	Australia	Capital Airport Group; property	29 ▼	3.90 ▲
31 ▲	3.97 ▲	Kie Chie Wong and family	Malaysia	Investor; resources	39 ▲	2.78 ▲
32 ▲	3.92 ▲	Jack Gance and Sam Gance	Australia	Chemist Warehouse; retail	51 ▲	2.38 ▲
33 ▲	3.83 ▲	Michael Heine and family	Australia	Financial services	42 ▲	2.67 ▲
34 ▼	3.75 ▼	Laurence Escalante	Australia	Gaming	27 ▲	3.90 ▲
35 ▼	3.75 ▲	Lachlan Murdoch	United States; United Kingdom; Australia	Media	33 ▼	3.35 ▼
36 ▼	3.60 ▲	Brett Blundy	Australia	Retail; property; agriculture	34 ▼	3.33 ▲
37 ▼	3.42 ▼	Michael Hodgson	Australia	Property	31 ▲	3.50 ▲
38 ▼	3.39 ▲	Gerry Harvey and Katie Page	Australia	Harvey Norman	37 ▼	2.91 ▼
39 ▲	3.38 ▲	Mario Verrocchi	Australia	Chemist Warehouse	52 ▲	2.35 ▲
40 ▼	3.35 ▼	Hui Wing Mau	China; Australia	Shimao Property	19 ▲	4.90 ▲
41 ▲	3.33 ▲	Sam Kennard and family	Australia	Kennards Self Storage	43 ▲	2.63 ▲
42 ▲	3.19 ▲	Prudence MacLeod	Australia	News Corporation and News UK	45 ▼	2.57 ▼
43 ▼	2.98 ▲	Stephen, Richard and Michael Hains and family	Australia	Investment	38 ▼	2.90 ▲
44 ▼	2.92 ▲	John Van Lieshout	Australia	Retail	41	2.72 ▲
45 ▲	2.89 ▲	Anthony Hall	Australia	Pro Medicus; Technology	75	1.85 ▲
46 ▼	2.88 ▲	Betty Klimenko, Monica Weinberg-Saunders and family	Australia	ex-Westfield Group Property	40 ▼	2.76 ▲
47 ▲	2.71 ▲	Gary Tieck, Paul Tieck and family	Australia	ex-Franklins; Property; investment	64 ▲	2.02 ▲
48 ▼	2.71 ▼	Andrew Budzinski	Australia	IC Markets; financial services	32 ▲	3.42 ▲
49 ▼	2.68 ▲	Bob Ell	Australia	Property	48 ▼	2.43 ▼
50 ▼	2.67 ▲	John Hancock	Australia	Hancock Prospecting	47 ▼	2.44 ▲
51 ▼	2.66 ▲	Bianca Rinehart	Australia	Hancock Prospecting	49 ▼	2.42 ▲
52 ▼	2.65 ▲	Ginia Rinehart	Australia	Hancock Prospecting	46 ▲	2.47 ▲
53 ▼	2.65 ▲	Hope Rinehart Welker	Australia	Hancock Prospecting	50 ▼	2.20 ▲
54 ▼	2.64 ▲	Sam Alter and family ^{[note 3]}	Australia	Retail	44 ▲	2.60
55 ▲	2.61 ▲	Sam Arnaout	Australia	Hospitality; property	57 ▲	2.23 ▲
56 ▲	2.55 ▲	David and Vicky Teoh	Australia	ex-TPG; Telecommunications	82 ▼	1.70 ▼
57 ▼	2.51 ▼	Tony Perich and family	Australia	Agriculture; property; So Natural, Narellan Town Centre	36 ▲	3.06 ▲
58 ▼	2.50 ▲	Chris Thomas	Australia	Agriculture	54 ▲	2.27 ▲
59 ▲	2.43 ▲	Nigel Austin	Australia	Cotton On Group; retail	65 ▼	2.00
60 ▼	2.36 ▲	Nick Politis	Australia	Retail; property	58 ▼	2.14 ▲
61 ▲	2.29 ▲	John Casella and family	Australia	Agriculture; Casella Family Brands	67 ▲	1.97 ▲
62 ▲	2.27 ▲	Tim Heath	Australia	Technology; gaming	n/a	not listed
63 ▲	2.25 ▲	Paul Little	Australia	Toll Holdings	76 ▼	1.83 ▲
200 ▼	0.718 ▼	Christian Beck	Australia	Technology	185 ▼	0.747 ▼

== Removed from the 2024 list ==
The following individuals, who appeared on the Financial Review Rich List 2023, did not appear on the 2024 list:

== Notes ==
- ^1: Individual was listed on a previous year's list, that was not the 2023 Rich List.
- ^2: Previous years' listing was in the name of Lang Walker. Walker died on 27 January 2024.
- ^3: Previous years' listings was in the name of Maurice Alter. Alter died on 13 April 2018.

== See also ==
- Financial Review Rich List
- Forbes Asia list of Australians by net worth
