= Financial Review Rich List 2025 =

Annual list of wealthiest Australians

The Financial Review Rich List 2025 is the 42nd annual survey of the 200 wealthiest people, assessed on the basis of net worth, who are resident in Australia, that was published by the Australian Financial Review on 30 May 2025.

The net worth of the wealthiest individual, was $38.11 billion; while the net worth of the 200th wealthiest individual, Michael Boyd, was $747 million; up from $718 million for the 200th individual in 2024.

The combined wealth of the 200 individuals was calculated as $667.8 bn, an increase of 6.9 per cent on the previous year. When the BRW Rich 100 commenced in 1984, the wealthiest 200 individuals had a combined net worth of $6.4 bn. Forty-two women were included on the 2025 Rich List, representing 21 per cent of the list; an increase from forty-one women in 2024. The 2025 list included ten debutants. Seven individuals appear on the 2025 Rich List and have appeared on every list since first published in 1984 as the BRW Rich 100; including Lindsay Fox, John Gandel, Solomon Lew, Frank Lowy, Alan Rydge, Kerry Stokes, and Harry Triguboff.

Rinehart held the mantle of Australia's wealthiest individual between 2011 and 2015; and has been the wealthiest Australian individual since 2020. From 2017 to 2019, Anthony Pratt was Australia's wealthiest individual, ranked third in the 2025 list, after Harry Triguboff, who was Australia's wealthiest individual in 2016.

== List of individuals ==
2025		Name	Citizenship	Source of wealth	2024	
Rank	Net worth A$ bn	Name	Citizenship	Source of wealth	Rank	Net worth A$ bn
1	38.11 ▼	Gina Rinehart	Australia	Hancock Prospecting; resources	1	40.61 ▲
2	29.65 ▲	Harry Triguboff	Australia	Meriton; property	2 ▲	26.49 ▲
3 ▲	25.84 ▲	Anthony Pratt and family	Australia	Visy; Pratt Industries; manufacturing	4 ▼	23.30 ▼
4 ▲	21.42 ▼	Scott Farquhar	Australia	Atlassian; investment	5 ▲	22.88 ▲
5 ▲	20.12 ▼	Clive Palmer	Australia	Mineralogy; resources; property	6 ▼	22.75 ▼
6 ▲	14.14 ▲	Melanie Perkins and Cliff Obrecht	Australia	Canva; technology	10 ▼	13.62 ▲
7 ▲	13.85 ▲	Michael Dorrell	Australia	Investment	n/a	not listed
8 ▲	13.30 ▼	Ivan Glasenberg	Australia; South Africa; Switzerland	Glencore; commodities trading	9 ▼	14.86 ▲
9 ▼	12.83 ▼	Nicola Forrest	Australia	Fortescue; resources	7	16.92 ▲
10 ▲	12.69 ▲	Kerry Stokes	Australia	Seven West Media; property; resources	12	11.30
11 ▼	12.68 ▼	Andrew Forrest	Australia	Fortescue; resources	8 ▼	16.76 ▼
12 ▼	12.18 ▼	Annie Cannon-Brookes ^{[note 1]}	Australia	Atlassian; investment	3 ▲	24.38 ▲
13 ▼	12.18 ▼	Mike Cannon-Brookes ^{[note 1]}	Australia	Atlassian; technology	3 ▲	24.38 ▲
14 ▲	11.27 ▲	Jack Gance, Sam Gance, and Damien Gance	Australia	Chemist Warehouse; retail	32 ▲	3.92 ▲
15 ▼	10.59 ▼	Richard White	Australia	Technology	11	11.63 ▲
16 ▼	10.28 ▲	Sir Frank Lowy	Australia	ex-Westfield; property	14 ▼	9.33
17 ▲	9.79 ▲	Mario Verrocchi, Marcello Verrocchi and Adrian Verrocchi	Australia	Chemist Warehouse; retail	39 ▲	3.38 ▲
18 ▲	8.41 ▲	Angela Bennett	Australia	Resources	22 ▼	5.04 ▲
19 ▼	8.05 ▼	Vivek Chaand Sehgal	Australia	Motherson Sumi; manufacturing	15 ▲	8.16 ▲
20 ▼	7.21 ▲	John Gandel	Australia	Property	16 ▼	6.94 ▲
21 ▲	7.18 ▲	Alexandra Burt and Leonie Baldock	Australia	Resources	29 ▲	4.13 ▲
22 ▼	6.98 ▲	Cameron Adams	Australia	Canva; technology	17 ▼	6.81 ▲
23 ▼	6.89 ▲	Suzanne Walker and family	Australia	Walker Corporation; property	18 ▲	6.08 ▲
24 ▼	6.69 ▲	Len Ainsworth and family	Australia	Gaming; manufacturing	19 ▼	5.85 ▲
25 ▼	6.08 ▼	Alan Wilson and family	Australia	Reece Group	13 ▲	10.64 ▲
26 ▼	5.73 ▲	Lindsay Fox	Australia	Linfox; property	21 ▲	5.69 ▲
27	5.07 ▲	Anthony Hall	Australia	Technology	unknown	2.90 ▲
28	5.01 ▲	Sam Hupert	Australia	Technology	unknown	2.90 ▲
29 ▼	5.01 ▲	Morry Fraid, Zac Fried and family	Australia	Retail; property	25 ▲	4.62 ▲
30 ▼	4.98 ▼	James Packer	Australia	Media; gaming	20 ▼	5.69 ▲
31 ▲	4.98 ▲	Vikas Rambal	Australia	Manufacturing	n/a	not listed
32 ▼	4.82 ▲	Ed Craven	Australia	Gaming	26 ▲	4.51 ▲
33 ▼	4.67 ▼	Jack Cowin	Australia	Competitive Foods; investment	23 ▼	4.88 ▲
34 ▼	4.65 ▲	Greg Goodman and family	Australia	Goodman Group; property	27 ▲	4.32 ▲
35 ▼	4.50 ▲	Laurence Escalante	Australia	Gaming	34 ▼	3.75 ▼
36 ▼	4.36 ▲	Michael Heine and family	Australia	Financial services	33 ▲	3.83 ▲
37 ▼	4.11 ▼	Solomon Lew	Australia	Premier Investments; retail	24 ▲	4.72 ▲
38 ▼	3.95 ▲	Brett Blundy	Australia	Retail; property; agriculture	36 ▼	3.60 ▲
39 ▼	3.82 ▲	Gerry Harvey and Katie Page	Australia	Harvey Norman	38 ▼	3.39 ▲
40	3.89 ▲	Hui Wing Mau	China; Australia	Shimao Property	40 ▼	3.35 ▼
41	3.79 ▲	Sam Kennard and family	Australia	Kennards Self Storage	41 ▲	3.33 ▲
42 ▼	3.72 ▲	Michael Hodgson	Australia	Property	37 ▼	3.42 ▼
43 ▼	3.72 ▼	Chau Chak Wing	Australia	Property; investments	28 ▲	4.20 ▼
44 ▼	3.50 ▲	Prudence MacLeod	Australia	Media; gaming	42 ▲	3.19 ▲
45 ▼	3.40 ▼	Kie Chie Wong and family	Malaysia	Investor; resources	31 ▲	3.97 ▲
46 ▲	3.29 ▲	Sam Chong	unknown	Resources	unknown	2.20 ▲
47 ▼	3.21 ▼	Lachlan Murdoch	United States; United Kingdom; Australia	Media	35 ▼	3.75 ▲
48 ▲	3.21 ▲	Manny Stul and family	Australia	Moose Toys; retail	unknown	2.00
49 ▼	3.10 ▲	Betty Klimenko, Monica Weinberg-Saunders and family	Australia	Property	46 ▼	2.88 ▲
50 ▲	3.07 ▲	Sam Arnaout	Australia	Hospitality; property	55 ▲	2.61 ▲
51 ▼	3.02 ▲	John Van Lieshout	Australia	Retail	44 ▼	2.92 ▲
52 ▲	2.97 ▲	Chris Thomas	Australia	Agriculture	58 ▼	2.50 ▲
53 ▲	2.93 ▲	Dennis Bastas	Australia	Manufacturing; retail	unknown	1.80 ▲
54 ▲	2.86 ▲	Tony Perich and family	Australia	Agriculture; property	57 ▼	2.51 ▼
55 ▼	2.83 ▲	Andrew Budzinski	Australia	Financial services	48 ▼	2.71 ▼
56	2.78 ▲	David and Vicky Teoh	Australia	Telecommunications	56 ▲	2.55 ▲
57 ▼	2.69 ▲	John Hancock	Australia	Hancock Prospecting	50 ▼	2.67 ▲
58 ▲	2.69 ▲	Simon Camilleri and family	Australia	Baiada; food services	n/a	not listed
59 ▼	2.68 ▲	Sam Alter and family	Australia	Retail	54 ▼	2.64 ▲
60 ▼	2.65 ▼	Bianca Rinehart	Australia	Hancock Prospecting	51 ▼	2.66 ▲
61 ▼	2.64 ▼	Ginia Rinehart	Australia	Hancock Prospecting	52 ▼	2.65 ▲
62 ▼	2.64 ▼	Hope Rinehart Welker	Australia	Hancock Prospecting	53 ▼	2.65 ▲
63 ▲	2.58 ▲	John Borg and Michael Borg and family	Australia	Manufacturing	unknown	2.20 ▲
64 ▼	2.58 ▲	Nick Politis	Australia	Retail; property	60 ▼	2.36 ▲
65 ▼	2.48 ▼	Bob Ell	Australia	Property	49 ▼	2.68 ▲
66 ▼	2.46 ▲	Tim Heath	Australia	Technology; gaming	62 ▲	2.27 ▲
67 ▼	2.42 ▼	Nigel Austin	Australia	Cotton On Group; retail	59 ▲	2.43 ▲
68 ▲	2.40 ▲	Dick Honan	Australia	Manufacturing	unknown	2.00 ▲
69 ▼	2.38 ▲	John Casella and family	Australia	Casella; agriculture	61 ▲	2.29 ▲
70 ▼	2.34 ▲	Paul Little	Australia	Toll; logistics	63 ▲	2.25 ▲
71	2.33 ▲	Gretel Packer	Australia	Media; gaming	unknown	2.20 ▲
72	2.27 ▲	Eddie Hirsch	Australia	United Petroleum; retail	unknown	2.20 ▲
73	2.25 ▲	Jonathan Munz and family	Australia	Manufacturing	unknown	2.20 ▲
74	2.25 ▲	Avi Silver	Australia	United Petroleum; retail	unknown	2.20 ▲
75	2.19 ▲	Theo Andrianakos and family	Australia	Property	unknown	1.70 ▲
76	2.13 ▲	Russell Withers and family	Australia	7-Eleven franchisor; retail	unknown	2.00 ▼
77	2.13 ▲	Robin Khuda	Australia	Technology	unknown	1.50 ▼
78	2.12 ▼	Lord Baron Michael Hintze	Australia; United Kingdom	Finance; property	unknown	2.20 ▲
79	2.12 ▲	Alan Rydge	Australia	EVT; investment; hospitality; entertainment	unknown	1.90 ▼
80	2.11 ▲	Chris Morris	Australia	Computershare; financial services; hospitality	unknown	1.60 ▲
81	2.06 ▲	Chris Wallin	Australia	QCoal; resources	unknown	1.80
82	2.01 ▲	Maha Sinnathamby	Australia	Residential property	unknown	2.00 ▲
83	2.00 ▲	Trevor Lee	Australia	Agriculture	unknown	1.90 ▲
84	1.98 ▲	Paul Lederer	Australia	Investment; manufacturing	unknown	1.90 ▲
85	1.97 ▲	Peter Gunn	Australia	Logistics; investment; property	unknown	1.80 ▲
86	1.97 ▲	Paul Salteri and family	Australia	Investment	unknown	1.80 ▼
87	1.97 ▲	Sam Prince	Australia	Zambrero; hospitality	unknown	1.60 ▲
88	1.94 ▲	Dale Elphinstone	Australia	Elphinstone Group; mining	unknown	1.80 ▲
89	1.94 ▲	John Richards and family	Australia	Waste management	unknown	1.80 ▲
90	1.78 ▼	Tim Roberts	Australia	Property; investment	unknown	1.90 ▼
91	1.77 ▲	Sandy Oatley and family	Australia	Property; tourism	unknown	1.60 ▲
92	1.76 ▲	Imelda Roche	Australia	Retail	unknown	1.70 ▲
93	1.75 ▲	Sam Tarascio	Australia	Property	unknown	1.70 ▲
94	1.75 ▲	Arthur Laundy	Australia	Hotels	unknown	1.60 ▲
95	1.74 ▲	Khalil Shahin and family	Australia	Peregrine; retail	unknown	1.50 ▼
96	1.73 ▼	Raymond Barro and Rhonda Barro	Australia	Construction	unknown	1.80 ▲
97	1.73 ▲	Terry Tzaneros and Arthur Tzaneros	Australia	Logistics	unknown	1.70
98	1.72 ▲	Naomi Milgrom ^{[note 4]}	Australia	Sussan; Sportsgirl; retail	unknown	1.60 ▲
99	1.72 ▲	Ralph Sarich	Australia	Investment; property	unknown	1.60 ▲
100	1.71 ▼	Ye Lipei	Australia; China	Property	unknown	1.73 ▼
101 ▼	1.71 ▼	Gary Tieck and family ^{[note 2]}	Australia	Property; investment	unknown	2.70 ▲
102	1.70 ▲	Craig Sutton, Lauren Sutton, Ryan Sutton & family	Australia	Retail	unknown	1.30 ▲
103	1.70	Shaun Bonétt	Australia	Precision Group; property	unknown	1.70 ▼
104 ▲	1.70 ▲	Peter Smaller	Australia	Manufacturing	n/a	not listed
105	1.69 ▲	Raphael Geminder	Australia	Manufacturing	unknown	1.60 ▲
106	1.67 ▼	James Ferguson and Robert Ferguson	Australia	Technology	unknown	1.90 ▲
107	1.65 ▲	Kerr Neilson	Australia	Platinum; financial services	unknown	1.60 ▲
108	1.64 ▲	Robert Millner and family	Australia	Soul Patts; investment	unknown	1.50 ▲
109	1.63	Andy Kennard and family	Australia	Kennards Hire	unknown	1.63 ▲
110	1.62 ▼	Russell Wilson and Kelly Wilson	Australia	Finance	unknown	2.00
111 ▼	1.60 ▼	Paul Tieck and family ^{[note 2]}	Australia	Property; investment	unknown	2.70 ▲
112	1.58 ▼	Nechama Werdiger and family	Australia	Property	unknown	1.60 ▲
113	1.58 ▲	Justin and Bettina Hemmes and family	Australia	Hotels; property	unknown	1.50 ▲
114	1.57 ▲	Charles Gibbon	Australia	Technology	unknown	1.40 ▲
115	1.55 ▲	Alex Waislitz	Australia	Investment	unknown	1.50 ▲
116	1.52 ▲	Nicholas Paspaley and family	Australia	Paspaley Pearls	unknown	1.50 ▲
117	1.50 ▲	Johnny Kahlbetzer and Marcus Kahlbetzer	Australia	Agriculture; property	unknown	1.40 ▼
118	1.50	Reg Rowe	Australia	Super Retail Group; retail	unknown	1.50 ▲
119	1.46 ▲	Roger Fletcher, Gail Fletcher and family	Australia	Agriculture	unknown	1.40
120 ▼	1.46 ▼	Ginette Snow and family ^{[note 3]}	Australia	Canberra Airport; property	unknown	4.10 ▲
121	1.45 ▲	Ervin Vidor and Charlotte Vidor	Australia	Property; hotels	unknown	1.40 ▲
122	1.41 ▲	Adrian Portelli	Australia	Media; gaming	unknown	1.30
123	1.40	Marnie Lewis-Millar, Shay Lewis-Thorp and family	Australia	Property	unknown	1.40 ▲
124 ▲	1.40 ▲	Nick DiMauro	Australia	Property	unknown	1.20 ▲
125	1.36 ▲	Lyn Ingham and family	Australia	Food services; investment	unknown	1.30 ▲
126	1.36 ▲	Larry Kestelman	Australia	Dodo; telecommunications; property	unknown	1.30 ▲
127 ▲	1.30 ▲	Ian Malouf	Australia	Bingo; waste services	unknown	1.10 ▲
128	1.29 ▲	Jack Zhang	Australia	Financial services; Airwallex	unknown	1.20 ▼
129	1.28 ▲	Peter Scanlon and family	Australia	Patrick Corporation; logistics, investment	unknown	1.20 ▲
130 ▼	1.27 ▼	Bruce Mathieson	Australia	Gaming; investments	unknown	1.70 ▼
131 ▲	1.25 ▲	Joanna Horgan and Peter Wetenhall	Australia	Mecca; retail	unknown	0.812 ▲
132 ▲	1.32 ▲	Ryan and Sam Kroonenburg	Australia	Technology	unknown	1.10 ▲
133 ▲	1.24 ▲	Greg Coffey	Australia	Financial services	unknown	1.10 ▲
134	1.23 ▲	Judith Neilson	Australia	Financial services	unknown	1.20 ▼
135	1.23 ▼	Peter Freedman	Australia	Røde; manufacturing	unknown	1.30 ▼
136 ▲	1.22 ▲	Robert Chamberlain	Australia	Travel	n/a	not listed
137	1.21 ▲	Max Beck	Australia	Property	unknown	1.10 ▲
138	1.21 ▲	Theo Karedis	Australia	Retail; property	unknown	1.00 ▲
139	1.20 ▲	Brian Flannery	Australia	Resources	unknown	0.939 ▼
140	1.19	Rod Spooner and family	Australia	Property; Caribbean Gardens	unknown	1.19 ▲
141	1.18 ▲	Harry Stamoulis and family	Australia	Property	unknown	1.10 ▲
142 ▲	1.17 ▲	Nick Wakim	Australia	Resources	n/a	not listed
143	1.16 ▲	Arnold Vitocco	Australia	Property	unknown	1.10 ▲
144	1.16 ▲	Bruce Gordon	Australia	Media; gaming	unknown	1.00 ▼
145	1.14 ▼	Neville Crichton	Australia	Retail	unknown	1.40 ▲
146	1.13 ▲	Spiros Alysandratos	Australia	Travel; property	unknown	1.10 ▲
147	1.13 ▼	Anthony Eisen	Australia	Technology	unknown	1.40 ▲
148	1.13 ▼	Will Vicars	Australia	Financial services	unknown	1.10 ▲
149	1.12 ▼	Simon Dyer and family	Australia	Manufacturing	unknown	1.40
150	1.11 ▲	Michael Gregg	Australia	Technology	unknown	1.00 ▲
151 ▼	1.11 ▼	Nick Molnar	Australia	Technology	unknown	1.40 ▲
152	1.10	Rod Duke	Australia	Briscoe Group	unknown	1.10
153	1.07 ▲	Denis Wagner and family	Australia	Construction; mining services	unknown	1.00 ▲
154	1.06 ▲	Sam and Andrew Buckeridge and family	Australia	Buckeridge Group	unknown	1.00 ▼
155	1.06 ▲	Robert Whyte	Australia	Investment	unknown	0.989 ▲
156	1.04 ▲	Shirley Costa and family	Australia	Agriculture	unknown	0.992 ▲
157	1.03 ▲	Lloyd Williams	Australia	Property; thoroughbreds	unknown	1.00 ▲
158	1.02 ▲	Roy Medich	Australia	Property	unknown	0.939 ▲
159	1.01 ▲	Carol Schwartz and Alan Schwartz ^{[note 4]}	Australia	Investment	unknown	0.989
160	1.01 ▼	Richard Smith	Australia	Food services	unknown	1.10 ▲
161	1.01 ▲	Daniel Besen ^{[note 4]}	Australia	Investment	unknown	0.887
162	0.995 ▲	Tim Gurner	Australia	Property	unknown	0.989 ▲
163	0.987 ▼	Con Makris and family	Australia	Property	unknown	0.998 ▼
164	0.984 ▲	Mick Power	Australia	Investment	unknown	0.941 ▲
165	0.983 ▲	Tony Walls	Australia	Technology	unknown	0.865 ▲
166 ▲	0.952 ▲	Robyn Denholm	Australia	Technology	n/a	not listed
167	0.951 ▲	Huang Bingwen and family	Australia	Manufacturing	unknown	0.905 ▼
168	0.940 ▲	Neil Rae and family	Australia	Ex-Gull Petroleum	unknown	0.899 ▲
169	0.939 ▲	Allan Myers	Australia	Investment; agriculture	unknown	0.928 ▲
170	0.927 ▲	Peter Hughes and family	Australia	Agriculture	unknown	0.913
171	0.907 ▲	Diane Burger and family	Australia	Property	unknown	0.832
172	0.893 ▲	Gordon Fu and family	Australia	Property	unknown	0.807 ▼
173 ▲	0.883 ▲	Ilias Pavlopoulos, Andrew Chepul and family	Australia	Finance	n/a	not listed
174	0.872 ▲	Robert Magid	Australia	Property	unknown	0.750 ▲
175 ▼	0.871 ▼	Chris Ellison	Australia	Mineral Resources	unknown	2.10 ▼
176	0.862 ▼	Maree Isaacs	Australia	Technology	unknown	0.870 ▲
177	0.861 ▲	Don McDonald and family	Australia	Agriculture	unknown	0.754 ▼
178 ▼	0.859 ▼	Mark Creasy	Australia	Resources	unknown	1.20 ▼
179	0.844 ▼	David Tudehope and Aiden Tudehope	Australia	Macquarie Telecom	unknown	0.915 ▲
180	0.841 ▼	Kim Cannon	Australia	Financial services	unknown	0.921
181	0.840	Zareh Nalbandian	Australia	Entertainment	unknown	0.840 ▲
182 ▲	0.839 ▲	Shane Young and David Young	Australia	Retail	n/a	not listed
183	0.837 ▲	Rhonda Wyllie and family	Australia	Investment	unknown	0.776 ▲
184	0.832 ▲	John Symond	Australia	Investment	unknown	0.780
185	0.823 ▲	Robin Murphy and family	Australia	Resources	unknown	0.750
186	0.814 ▲	Paul Fudge	Australia	Resources	unknown	0.779 ▼
187	0.798 ▲	John Winning	Australia	Retail	unknown	0.770 ▲
188	0.794 ▲	Kerry Harmanis	Australia	Resources	unknown	0.758 ▼
189	0.794 ▲	Kim McKendrick and family	Australia	Manufacturing	unknown	0.757 ▲
190	0.794 ▲	Kevin Seymour and family	Australia	Property	unknown	0.769 ▲
191 ▲	0.785 ▲	Margaret Dymond and family	Australia	Retail	n/a	not listed
192 ▲	0.784 ▲	Christian Beck	Australia	Technology	200 ▼	0.718 ▼
193	0.782 ▼	Nicky Zimmermann and Simone Zimmermann	Australia	Zimmermann; retail	unknown	0.793
194	0.781 ▲	Tony Tarak and family	Australia	Bingo; waste services	unknown	0.755 ▲
195	0.780 ▼	Tony Denny	Australia	Retail; property	unknown	0.790 ▲
196	0.776 ▼	John Singleton	Australia	Investment	unknown	0.800 ▼
197	0.772 ▲	George Kepper	Australia	Technology	unknown	0.749 ▼
198	0.771 ▲	John Higgins	Australia	Investment	unknown	0.760 ▲
199 ▲	0.748 ▲	Matthew Latimore	Australia	Resources	n/a	not listed
200	0.727 ▼	Michael Boyd	Australia	Sonic Healthcare	unknown	0.824 ▲

== Notes ==
- ^1: Net worth was previously aggregated as Annie and Mike Cannon-Brookes.
- ^2: Net worth was previously aggregated as Garry Tieck and Paul Teick and families.
- ^3: Net worth was previously reported in the name of Terry Snow. Following Snow's death in 2024, his net worth was distributed to his surviving wife and family, and to a charitable trust.
- ^4: Net worth was previously reported in the name of Marc Besen. Following Besen's death in 2023, his net worth was distributed to his children, Naomi Milgrom, Carol Schwartz and Daniel Besen.

== See also ==
- Financial Review Rich List
- Forbes Asia list of Australians by net worth
