= Geminder =

Geminder is a surname. Notable people with the surname include:

- Bedřich Geminder (1901–1952), Czechoslovak politician
- Fiona Geminder, Australian businesswoman
- Raphael Geminder, Australian businessman
