= Automotive Holdings Group =

Automotive company

- Company type: Public
- Traded as: ASX: AHG
- Industry: Automotive
- Founded: 1952
- Successor: Eagers Automotive
- Headquarters: Perth, Western Australia
- Key people: John McConnell (MD)
- Website: ahg.com.au/

Automotive Holdings Group Limited was an Australian company specialising in automotive retail and logistics. It was established in 1952. AHG was listed on the Australian Securities Exchange. As of February 2017, its largest shareholder was Nick Politis, who held a 22.8% stake through his shareholding in Eagers Automotive. John McConnell became managing director of AHG in 2016.

In 2019 AHG was acquired by Eagers Automotive and was subsequently delisted.
