= AirTrunk =

Australian data centre company

- Type: Subsidiary
- Industry: Data centres
- Founded: 2015
- Founder: Robin Khuda
- Headquarters: Australia
- Area served: Australia, Singapore, Japan, Malaysia, Hong Kong and India
- Services: Data centre services
- Owner: Blackstone
- Parent: Blackstone

AirTrunk is an Australian data centre company founded by Robin Khuda in 2015, and sold to Blackstone for A$24 billion (US$16 billion). The company operates more than 3 GW of operating and planned capacity across 20 sites in six countries: Australia, Singapore, Japan, Malaysia, Hong Kong, and India.

== Operations ==
=== Japan ===
AirTrunk has four hyperscale campuses in Japan: TOK1 and TOK2 in the Tokyo area, and OSK1 and OSK2 in Osaka. At full build-out, the four campuses are expected to deliver approximately 530 MW of total capacity.

The flagship TOK1 campus, located in east Tokyo, is designed to scale to more than 300 MW of capacity. In March 2026, AirTrunk secured a JP¥191.6 billion (US$1.24 billion) green loan to refinance existing facilities and fund further development phases at TOK1 – the largest data centre financing ever completed in Japan. The loan was structured under AirTrunk's Green Financing Framework and was led by Sumitomo Mitsui Banking Corporation, MUFG Bank, Crédit Agricole CIB and Société Générale as global coordinators, with twelve banks participating in total.

=== India ===
In April 2026, AirTrunk announced the acquisition of Lumina CloudInfra, a data centre developer founded by Blackstone, to expand its presence in India. The value of the deal was not disclosed. Lumina has 600 MW of planned capacity and up to US$5 billion in development potential.
