= Eagers Automotive =

Automotive retail group in Australia and New Zealand

Eagers Automative Limited
- Formerly: AP Eagers
- Type: Public
- Traded as: ASX: APE
- Founded: 1913
- Headquarters: 5 Edmund Street, Newstead, Queensland, Australia
- Areas served: Australia
- Key people: Keith Thornton (CEO); Timothy Crommelin (Chairman)
- Revenue: $11.2 billion (2024)
- Net income: $372 million (2024)
- Number of employees: Over 8,500 (2020)
- Website: www.eagersautomotive.com.au

Eagers Automotive is an automotive retail group in Australia and New Zealand. Starting as AP Eagers Automotive Limited, it has a history of more than 100 years. The company name changed to Eagers Automotive Limited from A.P. Eagers Limited in 2020 following its acquisition of the Automotive Holdings Group. The business owns and operates a wide range of motor vehicle dealerships across Australia and New Zealand.

== History ==
The company was founded by Edward George Eager in 1913 as E.G. Eager & Son Limited In 1922, they opened an automobile assembly plant in Queensland, and in 1930 obtained distribution rights to General Motors products in Queensland and northern New South Wales. The company went public in 1957 under the name Eagers Holdings Limited. It merged in 1992 with A.P. Group Limited, founded as A.P. Motors by Alan Piper in 1978, and was renamed to A.P. Eagers Limited. In 2019 it acquired its major competitor, the Automotive Holdings Group.

In 2011, the company was inducted into the Queensland Business Leaders Hall of Fame.

In February 2021 the company said it would not repay any of the $130 million it received under the Federal Government's JobKeeper scheme despite posting a profit. It said it used the money to save 2000 jobs, which was the original intention of the scheme and the payments went to 6,500 employees when the industry was under severe pressure. It has subsequently recorded accelerated profits.

In July 2025, the company was appointed the Australian main retailer for BYD Auto.

== Operations ==
Directors of the company are Timothy Crommelin (Chairman), Nick Politis, Daniel Ryan, David Cowper, Marcus Birrell, Sophie Moore, Gregory Duncan, David Blackhall and Michelle Prater. The CEO is Keith Thornton.

The Car Retailing and Truck Retailing segments offer new, used, maintenance and repair services, parts, extended service contracts, brokerage, and protection for vehicles. The property segment works on the acquisition of commercial properties for its dealerships.

The Investment segment includes investments in DealerMotive, Automotive Holdings Group, Smartgroup Corporation and Dealercell Holdings.

== Ownership ==
Eagers is 28.3 per cent owned by billionaire Nick Politis
