= Leslie Alan Wilson =

Australian billionaire

- Born: 1941 or 1942 (age 84–85)
- Education: Camberwell Grammar School
- Occupations: Executive chairman, Reece Group
- Years active: 1970-present
- Children: Peter Wilson

Leslie Alan Wilson (born 1941/42), an Australian billionaire, is the executive chairman of Reece Group, Australia's biggest bathroom and plumbing supplies chain.

Wilson was educated at Camberwell Grammar School, Melbourne, matriculating in 1959.

Wilson was CEO of Reece from 1970 to 2007, and has been executive chairman since 2001. His son Peter is the CEO.

== Net worth ==
As of May 2023, The Australian Financial Review assessed the net worth of the Wilson family as A$6.51 billion on the Financial Review 2023 Rich List. The Wilson family had earlier appeared in the BRW Rich Families List that was published annually between 2008 and 2015. Meanwhile, Forbes Asia assessed Wilson's net worth as US$1.6 billion in 2017; revised to US$2.50 billion in 2019.

Year	Financial Review Rich List		Forbes Australia's 50 richest	
Year	Rank	Net worth A$ bn	Rank	Net worth US$ bn
2012	n/a	$1.44 billion ▼		
2013	n/a	$1.83 billion ▲		
2014	n/a	$2.34 billion ▲		
2015	n/a	$2.60 billion ▲		
2016				
2017				$1.6 billion
2018	16	$3.87 billion ▲		
2019	16	$4.07 billion ▲	14 ▲	$2.50 billion ▼
2020	12 ▲	$4.93 billion ▲		
2021	11 ▲	$7.86 billion ▲		
2022	14 ▼	$6.60 billion ▼		
2023	14	$6.51 billion ▼		

Legend
Icon	Description
Steady	Has not changed from the previous year
▲	Has increased from the previous year
▼	Has decreased from the previous year
