= Wes Maas =

Australian rugby league footballer

Personal information
- Full name: Wesley Maas
- Born: 12 February 1980 (age 45); Camden, New South Wales, Australia

Playing information
- Position: Prop, Second-row
Club
Years	Team	Pld	T	G	FG	P
2002	South Sydney	2	0	0	0	0

Wes Maas (born 12 February 1980) is an Australian former professional rugby league footballer who played in the 2000s. He played for South Sydney in the NRL competition.

== Playing career ==
Maas played for the Parramatta Eels in reserve grade and won two premierships with the club in the late 1990s. Before signing with Souths, Maas was likened to former South Sydney player Les Davidson by rugby league journalist, Steve Mascord.

Maas made his first grade debut for South Sydney against the Brisbane Broncos in round 8 2002 which ended in a 42–16 loss at the Sydney Football Stadium. He made his final appearances in the top grade the following week against the New Zealand Warriors which ended in a 25–18 loss.

Maas was later released by South Sydney and played in the lower grades for Balmain. In 2007, Maas signed for CYMS Dubbo in the group 11 competition.

== Career following professional football ==
In 2017, Maas continued to have some involvement with rugby league and coached St Mary's, Dubbo.

Maas founded the MAAS Group and became a property developer. Maas debuted on The Australian Financial Review Rich List in 2021 with a net worth of A$593 million.

Year	Financial Review Rich List		Forbes Australia's 50 Richest	
Year	Rank	Net worth (A$)	Rank	Net worth (US$)
2021	198 ▲	$593 million ▲		

Legend
Icon	Description
Steady	Has not changed from the previous year
▲	Has increased from the previous year
▼	Has decreased from the previous year
