= Financial Review Rich List 2022 =

Annual list of wealthiest Australians

The Financial Review Rich List 2022 is the 39th annual survey of the 200 wealthiest people resident in Australia, published by the Australian Financial Review on 26 May 2022.

The net worth of the wealthiest individual, Gina Rinehart, was $34.02 billion; while the net worth of the 200th wealthiest, Graham & Jude Turner, was $629 million; up from $590 million for the 200th individual in 2021. The combined wealth of the 200 entries was $554.9 bn, an increase of $75.3 bn on the previous year; compared with a combined wealth of $6.4 bn in 1984 when the BRW Rich 200 commenced. Thirty-seven women were included on the 2022 Rich List, representing 18.5 percent of the list; down from thirty-nine women in 2021, or 19.5 percent. The list included thirteen debutants.

Rinehart held the mantle of Australia's wealthiest individual between 2011 and 2015; and was also the wealthiest Australian individual in 2020 and 2021. From 2017 to 2019, Anthony Pratt was Australia's wealthiest individual, ranked fifth in the 2022 Rich List. Harry Triguboff was Australia's wealthiest individual in 2016, ranked sixth in the 2022 Rich List.

== Removed from the 2022 list ==
The following individuals, who appeared on the Financial Review Rich List 2021, did not appear on the 2022 list:

== Notes ==
- ^1: Individual was listed on a previous year's list, that was not the 2021 Rich List.

== See also ==
- Financial Review Rich List
- Forbes Asia list of Australians by net worth
