= So Natural (brand) =

Australian brand

So Natural, an Australian brand of organic products, is part of Freedom Foods Group, a diversified food company operating in the health and wellness sector. So Natural was formed in 1991 when it started producing soy milk.

In 2004, So Natural gained wide publicity in Australia when it announced an equity deal with Australian swimmer Ian Thorpe. Thorpe was offered a stake in Freedom Foods Group, initially worth A$1.1m in return for the use of his name and image on their products. The 15-year deal covers markets across East and Southeast Asia where Thorpe is widely popular, and could expand Thorpe's share in the venture to 50 percent depending on its commercial success.

Freedom Foods Group is listed on the Australian Securities Exchange. The Perich family of Leppington, who appear annually on the Financial Review Rich List, have a substantive holding in the company.

The Age reported in 2004 that So Natural had been "hit hard" as soy popularity dropped. In 2004, Tony Perich bought into Freedom Foods, paying "about $3 million for a 10 per cent stake in what was then called So Natural Foods Australia."

In 2015, So Natural was being sold by JD.com. Freedom Foods was the fastest growing supplier of branded retail grocery products in Australia in 2019.

Freedom Foods Group was called Noumi Limited, since 30 Nov. 2021. Parent company Freedom Foods changed its name in 2021 following the sale of its cereal and snacks division. In 2023, the parent company of So Natural, Freedom Food, was sued by the ASIC for alleged misleading conduct concerning its finances. At the time, beyond So Natural, Freedom Food brands included Milklab, Australia's Own, and Vitalife.
