= Raphael Geminder =

Australian businessperson

- Born: South Africa
- Education: King David Linksfield High School; Syracuse University
- Occupation: Businessman
- Spouse: Fiona Geminder
- Children: 4

Raphael Geminder is an Australian businessman, most notable for being the founder of the Pact Group Holdings, which is the largest packaging company in Australia.

== Career ==
Geminder was born and raised in South Africa. He attended the King David Linksfield High School in Johannesburg. He completed his MBA in Finance from Syracuse University. He served as the chairman of Visy from 1991 to 2002. In 2002, he founded the Pact Group Holdings, and he serves as its non-executive chairman. As of September 2022, Geminder owned 47 percent of PACT.

Geminder has served as the Honorary Consul of the Republic of South Africa, in the State of Victoria, since July 2006. In 2015 it was reported that Geminder was a board member of the Carlton Football Club.

== Personal life ==
Geminder is married to Fiona Geminder, who was, in 2021, equally notable for being the third richest woman in Australia; and is a daughter of the late Richard Pratt and Jeanne Pratt AC.

Raphael and Fiona Geminder have four children, Georgia Geminder, who left a career of fashion modelling to start her own herbal toothpaste company. Bella Geminder who is a model and founder of a beauty brand and two sons

=== Net worth ===
As of 2021, Forbes assessed his net worth at US$3.3 billion. As of May 2025, Geminder's net worth was assessed by the Financial Review in its 2015 Rich List as A$1.69 billion.

Year	Australian Financial Review Rich List		Forbes Australia's 50 Richest	
Year	Rank	Net worth (A$)	Rank	Net worth (US$)
2019	53	$957 million ▼		
2020	98 ▼	$957 million		
2021	90 ▲	$1.27 billion ▲		$3.30 billion
2022	92 ▼	$1.50 billion ▲		
2023	108 ▼	$1.30 billion ▼		
2024		$1.60 billion ▲		
2025	105	$1.69 billion ▲		

Legend
Icon	Description
Steady	Has not changed from the previous year
▲	Has increased from the previous year
▼	Has decreased from the previous year
