= Robin Khuda =

Australian bllionaire

- Born: 1979 or 1980 (age 46–47); Dhaka, Bangladesh
- Education: University of Technology Sydney
- Known for: founder of AirTrunk
- Children: 2

Robin Khuda (born 1979 or 1980) is an Australian billionaire, and the founder of AirTrunk, a data centre company.

== Early life ==
Robin Khuda was born and raised in Dhaka, Bangladesh. He was educated at Sher-e-Bangla Nagar Government Boys' High School and SOS Hermann Gmeiner College.

Khuda moved to Australia aged 18 to continue his accountancy studies. He earned a degree in accounting from the University of Technology Sydney.

== Career ==
He worked in the telecoms and cloud computing businesses for Singtel and Fujitsu, before becoming chief financial officer (CFO) of Pipe Networks, and then CFO of NextDC.

At one point, he used his retirement savings to keep the business going and considered bankruptcy.

In 2024, he was named AFR "Business Person of the Year". He was elected a Fellow of the Australian Academy of Technological Sciences & Engineering in 2026.

== Personal life ==
Khuda lives in Sydney with his wife, two daughters and his parents.
