= John Van Lieshout =

Australian billionaire

- Born: 1946 (age 79–80); Netherlands
- Occupation: Property developer
- Children: 3

John Van Lieshout (born 1946) is an Australian billionaire, the founder and former owner of the Amart Furniture store chain.

== Early life ==
Born in the Netherlands in 1946, Van Lieshout is one of 13 children of Karel van Lieshout, a plasterer, and his wife, Anna, who emigrated to Australia in 1960, initially processed at Brisbane's Wacol Migrant Camp.

Van Lieshout has a high school diploma.

== Career ==
Van Lieshout is the founder and former owner of the Super A-Mart furniture store chain. He sold Super A-Mart in 2006 for A$500 million, and moved into property development. Through his Unison Projects Group, he has acquired 600 housing blocks and 200 townhouses in the Brisbane area.

Other members of the family have founded businesses, and the family is known in Australia as the "kings and queens of furniture", having founded chains including Empire Office Furniture, Super A-Mart, BW Coles, Chevron and the Woolstore.

== Personal life ==
Van Lieshout is married with three children and lives in Brisbane, Queensland.

=== Net worth ===
In 2014, Queensland's Sunday Mail named Van Lieshout as the richest person in Queensland, by net worth. However, as of May 2025, the Financial Review in the 2025 Rich List had assessed Van Lieshout's net worth as A$3.02 billion and Clive Palmer was the richest person in the state, with a net worth of A$20.12 billion.

Year	Financial Review Rich List		Forbes Australia's 50 Richest	
Year	Rank	Net worth (A$)	Rank	Net worth (US$)
2016			28 ▼	$970 million ▼
2017		$1.72 billion		
2018	33 ▲	$1.92 billion ▲		
2019	29 ▲	$2.51 billion ▲	31 ▼	$1.40 billion ▲
2020	45 ▼	$2.03 billion ▼		
2021	43 ▲	$2.49 billion ▲		
2022	41 ▲	$2.70 billion ▲		
2023	41	$2.72 billion ▲		
2024	44 ▼	$2.92 billion ▲		
2025	51 ▼	$3.02 billion ▲		

Legend
Icon	Description
Steady	Has not changed from the previous year
▲	Has increased from the previous year
▼	Has decreased from the previous year
