= Betty Klimenko =

Australian businessperson and motorsport team owner (born 1959)

Betty Klimenko AM
- Born: 1959 (age 66–67); Sydney, New South Wales, Australia
- Occupations: Businessperson; Motorsport team owner
- Known for: First female team owner to win the Bathurst 1000
- Spouse: Daniel Klimenko
- Children: 3

Betty Ann Saunders-Klimenko AM (born 1959) is an Australian businessperson and motorsport team owner who runs the Erebus Motorsport squad in the Supercars Championship. In 2017, she became the first female team owner to win the Bathurst 1000. Klimenko is a promoter of women in motorsport and is a global ambassador for the Australian arm of the Dare to be Different initiative.

== Early life ==
Klimenko was the illegitimate child born to a police officer who served in the Vietnam War and the prostitute and former Miss West Australia Anne Neil in Sydney in 1959. She has three biological siblings. She was conceived drug-addicted in Kings Cross Police Station's Cell No. 3, and was abandoned at the adoption nursery of the former Crown Street Women's Hospital by her biological parents at seven weeks old. She has little knowledge of her biological mother, who died when Klimenko was aged five, and never met her parents. Klimenko was adopted by the Hungarian-Jewish, Westfield Group co-founder and Nazi concentration camp survivor John Saunders and his wife Eta. Klimenko was born a Catholic and was raised as Jewish (although never converted). She has a younger adopted brother, and was raised by nannies, due to Saunders' work commitments. Klimenko attended a Church of England school.

== Career ==
At age 13, Klimenko began working for Saunders as a cleaner in the toilets and kitchens of his shopping centres every Saturday for half a decade. She also worked as a Santa's little helper in shopping centres before becoming the first female employee in the men's jeans department at Grace Bros. Saunders cut Klimenko off from his life following her second marriage to a non-Jewish man in Las Vegas and she had to assume a working-class life in the suburb of Matraville, Sydney living on her husband's income. Saunders and she reconciled after Klimenko gave birth to her son and subsequently received a share of her adoptive fathers' fortune, following his death in 1997. She is joint deputy chairperson of the family-owned property development company Terrace Tower Group with her sister.

In 1999, Klimenko developed an interest for motor racing when her husband took her to a Porsche driving experience as a spectator. Working with her husband, she participated in amateur and semi-professional forms of motor racing, primarily Formula 3 and GT racing as a sponsor for 14 years. She also fielded a squad of SLS Mercedes GT cars in the GT3 category. In September 2012, Klimenko purchased the Stone Brothers Racing team and V8 Supercars Championship racing license from co-owners Ross Stone and Jimmy Stone starting from the 2013 season. She renamed the team Erebus Motorsport after the Greek god of darkness, and would lease the licence for two years until 1 January 2015. This made Klimenko the first female to own a V8 Supercars squad. She and the former head of Mercedes-Benz's motorsport activities Norbert Haug agreed to an engine supply deal for Erebus Motorsport and was a Mercedes team, despite Mercedes-Benz Australia-Pacific telling its head office in Germany that V8 Supercars "was a sport for yobbos."

To allow for the continuation of Erebus Motorsport, Klimenko financed the team from a family trust to service a loan after using up her personal income. The relationship between her and Mercedes-AMG and HWA strained because the German marque did not understand the V8 Supercars Championship and team principal Ross Stone and team manager David Stuart left Erebus Motorsport. Klimenko switched manufacturers Mercedes to Holden in 2016 and moved Erebus Motorsport's headquarters from Queensland to Victoria. She was the first woman team owner to win the Bathurst 1000 when Erebus Motorsport drivers David Reynolds and Luke Youlden finished first in the 2017 edition. In the 2018 championship, Klimenko's team finished fourth in the Teams' Championship. She sold 50 per cent of her share of the No. 99 Racing Entitlement Contract used by Erebus Motorsport, to the team's CEO Barry Ryan in June 2019.

Klimenko promotes women in motorsport. She led the nationwide Women in Auto Trades campaign opposite Auto Skills Australia and the Australian Government in 2014 visiting schools and aiming to get young girls into the motor trades industry. In March 2018, Klimenko joined the Australian arm of the Dare to be Different initiative as a global ambassador aiming to increase involvement of women at all levels of motor racing. She is an ambassador for the Blue Datto Foundation, and of the bereavement charity for children Feel the Magic. Klimenko featured on a November 2013 episode of 60 Minutes detailing her life and motor racing career.

== Personal life ==
She is married to Daniel Klimenko with whom she has one child. Klimenko has two children from a previous marriage that lasted five years from 1981 to 1986. She was made a Member of the Order of Australia in the 2022 Queen's Birthday Honours "for significant service to motorsport, and to charitable organisations".

=== Net worth ===
As of May 2025 the Australian Financial Review estimated Klimenko's net worth as A$3.10 billion as published in the 2025 Rich List, held jointly with her half-sister, Monica Saunders-Weinberg, and their family. Klimenko and Saunders-Weinberg first appeared in the 2019 Rich List.

Year	Financial Review Rich List		Forbes Australia's 50 richest	
Year	Rank	Net worth A$	Rank	Net worth US$
2019	32 ▲	$2.37 billion ▲		
2020	29 ▲	$2.73 billion ▲		
2021	37 ▼	$2.66 billion ▼		
2022	40 ▼	$2.70 billion ▼		
2023	40	$2.76 billion ▲		
2024	46 ▼	$2.88 billion ▲		
2025	49 ▼	$3.10 billion ▲		

Legend
Icon	Description
Steady	Has not changed from the previous year
▲	Has increased from the previous year
▼	Has decreased from the previous year

=== Personality ===
Klimenko is a non-comfortist; Jane Cadzow of The Age noted "She swears, she smokes, she has a lot of tattoos." Described as "…outspoken and unapologetic…" by Autosport, she is popular in Australian motorsport for "…her very personal brand of fan engagement plays very well indeed with the fans…" according to DailySportsCar.
