= Andrew Budzinski =

Australian businessman (born 1975)

- Born: 1975 (age 50–51); Perth, Western Australia, Australia
- Citizenship: Australia
- Education: University of Western Australia
- Occupations: Entrepreneur; Cryptocurrency and currency trader
- Known for: Founder of IC Markets
- Board member of: IC Markets

Andrew Budzinski (born May 1975) is an Australian billionaire businessman who is the founder of IC Markets, a forex and CFD brokerage firm based in Sydney.

== Biography ==
Andrew Budzinski was born in May 1975 in Perth, Western Australia. He attended the University of Western Australia, where he graduated with a degree in finance and marketing.

Budzinski began his career as a stockbroker. Later, he worked as a compliance officer for CMC Markets. In 2007, Budzinski founded IC Markets. The company has been the subject of multiple class actions.

{In May 2025, the Financial Review Rich List 2025 assessed Budzinski's net worth at A$2.83 billion. Budzinski, who lives in Cyprus, sold his Dalkeith, Perth home in 2023 for A$8.26 million.
