= Cliff Obrecht =

Australian technology entrepreneur

- Education: University of Western Australia
- Title: Co-founder and COO, Canva
- Spouse: Melanie Perkins (m. 2021)

Clifford Obrecht is an Australian technology entrepreneur. He is a co-founder and the chief operating officer of Canva, which he founded with Melanie Perkins and Cameron Adams. Obrecht and Perkins have pledged to give more than 80 per cent of their wealth to charitable causes through the Canva Foundation.

== Early life and education ==
Obrecht was born to Stan Obrecht, a government employee, and Mary Obrecht, a schoolteacher. He grew up in Kingsley, a suburb north of Perth. He earned degrees in arts and education from the University of Western Australia.

== Career ==
While studying at university, Obrecht and Perkins developed Fusion Books, an online design tool for school yearbooks. The business was used by about 400 Australian schools at its peak. They subsequently sought funding for a more broadly applicable online design platform and received more than 100 rejections from investors. In 2012, Blackbird Ventures invested in the proposed business, and Cameron Adams joined Obrecht and Perkins as a technical co-founder. Canva launched the following year.

In a 2025 interview with Fast Company, Obrecht described generative artificial intelligence as a further development in making design tools more accessible. He said that creative professionals should adopt the technology, while also arguing that creators whose work is used to train AI models should be compensated. In April 2026, TechRadar reported that Obrecht and Adams presented Canva's approach to AI-generated designs as retaining editable layers, allowing either the user or the software to revise individual elements rather than regenerating an entire image.

== Philanthropy ==
Obrecht and Perkins signed the Giving Pledge in 2021 and committed to donate more than 80 per cent of their wealth through the Canva Foundation. In August 2026, Inside Philanthropy reported that the foundation had distributed nearly US$84 million between 2022 and the end of 2025. Its commitments included US$150 million for direct cash transfers in Malawi through GiveDirectly.

In July 2026, the couple launched the Global Goals Platform through the foundation. The initiative began by surveying people about changes they wanted in their communities and the wider world, with pilot programmes in the United States and Wollongong.

== Personal life ==
In January 2021, Obrecht married Perkins on Rottnest Island.

=== Net worth ===
In May 2025, the Australian Financial Review estimated Obrecht and Perkins' joint net worth at A$14.14 billion and placed them sixth on the Financial Review Rich List 2025. As of August 2026, Forbes estimated Obrecht's individual net worth at US$7.6 billion.
