= Leonard Ainsworth =

Australian businessman

Len Ainsworth AM
- Born: Leonard Hasting Ainsworth; 1922 or 1923 (age 102–103); Kempsey, New South Wales, Australia
- Occupations: Businessman, philanthropist
- Years active: 1953–2019
- Known for: Founder of Aristocrat Leisure
- Spouses: Betty Ainsworth (divorced); Margarete (Gretel) Ainsworth
- Children: 7

Leonard Hasting "Len" Ainsworth AM (born c. 1923) is an Australian businessman, most widely known for founding Aristocrat Leisure, one of the world's largest gambling-machine companies. He founded the company in 1953, and remained active until 1994; and later founded Ainsworth Gaming Technology, and was an executive director until 2019.

== Career ==
Ainsworth inherited a small business from his father and began making poker machines to boost revenues for his dental supplies and equipment manufacturing venture. This side-line quickly grew, and Aristocrat Leisure was born in 1953. Today, it is one of the world's largest manufacturers of slot machines and online gaming entertainment.

Following a 1984 diagnosis of prostate cancer, Ainsworth sold Aristocrat, giving significant funds to his family, several members of which continue the tradition of philanthropy. Following a clear diagnosis, Ainsworth initially retired and then established Ainsworth Gaming Technology, a manufacturer of up to about 35 percent of Australia’s gambling machines. Ainsworth sold his majority stake in Ainsworth Gaming Technology to Novomatic for A$473 million, when he was aged 94 years.

== Personal life ==
Ainsworth has seven sons, five to his first wife Betty and later, two to his second wife Margarette (Gretel). In 2018, Ainsworth was appointed as a Member of the Order of Australia (AM) for his impact on business and manufacturing as well as his service to the community through philanthropic contributions.

Ainsworth has donated to the Sydney Children’s Hospital Foundation, St Vincent’s Private Hospital and the Children's Medical Research Institute, the University of Wollongong, and the University of New South Wales. He has been awarded two honorary doctorates, the first by the University of NSW and most recently in 2019 by the University of Wollongong. Ainsworth signed The Giving Pledge in March 2017.

=== Net worth ===
In 2019, Ainsworth was ranked 42nd on the Forbes list of 50 wealthiest Australians, with an estimated net worth of US$900 million. As of May 2025, Ainsworth was listed 24th on the Financial Review 2025 Rich List with an estimated net worth of A$6.69 billion.

Year	Financial Review Rich List		Forbes Australia's 50 Richest	
Year	Rank	Net worth (A$)	Rank	Net worth (US$)
2014	19 ▲	$1.82 billion ▲		
2015			24 ▼	$1.20 billion ▼
2016			33 ▼	$0.76 billion ▼
2017	11	$3.07 billion ▲		
2018	14 ▼	$4.02 billion ▲	31 ▼	
2019	17 ▼	$4.01 billion ▼	42 ▼	$0.90 billion ▲
2020	18 ▼	$4.42 billion ▲		
2021	16 ▲	$5.04 billion ▲		
2022	11 ▲	$7.70 billion ▲		
2023	17 ▼	$5.22 billion ▼		
2024	19 ▼	$5.85 billion ▲		
2025	24 ▼	$6.69 billion ▲		

Legend
Icon	Description
Steady	Has not changed from the previous year
▲	Has increased from the previous year
▼	Has decreased from the previous year
