= Elphinstone Group =

Australian manufacturer of mining equipment

- Type: Private
- Industry: Heavy equipment manufacturing Defence manufacturing
- Founded: 1975
- Founder: Dale Elphinstone
- Headquarters: Burnie, Tasmania, Australia
- Area served: Asia-Pacific
- Key people: Dale Elphinstone (Executive Chairman); Kelly Elphinstone (Managing Director)
- Products: Underground mining equipment Mining support vehicles Defence vehicle hulls Off-highway haul trucks
- Number of employees: ~2,500 (2019)
- Website: Official website

Elphinstone Group is an Australian private industrial group specialising in the design and manufacture of underground mining equipment, heavy vehicles, and defence components. Headquartered in Burnie, Tasmania, the enterprise is one of the state's largest private employers.

Historically known for its manufacturing joint venture with Caterpillar, the company re-established itself as an independent original equipment manufacturer (OEM) in 2016 and has since diversified into the defence industry. The group also maintains commercial interests in renewable energy systems, public transport assembly, and property development.

== History ==
=== Early years (1975–1994) ===
Dale Elphinstone founded the Elphinstone Group in 1975 in Burnie, Tasmania. Initially operating out of a shed on his father’s farm, he established Dale B Elphinstone Pty Ltd to modify Caterpillar (Cat) surface mining machinery for underground mining applications. The enterprise opened a head office in Burnie on Hopkinson Street in 1976. The following year it sold its first underground truck: the Elphinstone 79C, based on a modified Caterpillar 769C chassis.

During the late 1970s and 1980s, the company transitioned from equipment modification to the in-house design and production of purpose-built underground vehicles. Early models included specialised support machinery such as the 920 scaler and the 925 integrated tool carrier, both built on the Cat 920 loader platform. In the early 1980s, Elphinstone introduced the AD13 and AD17, its first proprietary underground dump trucks.

By the early 1990s, the business had expanded internationally as a specialist original equipment manufacturer (OEM), benefiting from growing global demand for mechanised underground mining systems.

=== Caterpillar joint venture (1995–2015) ===
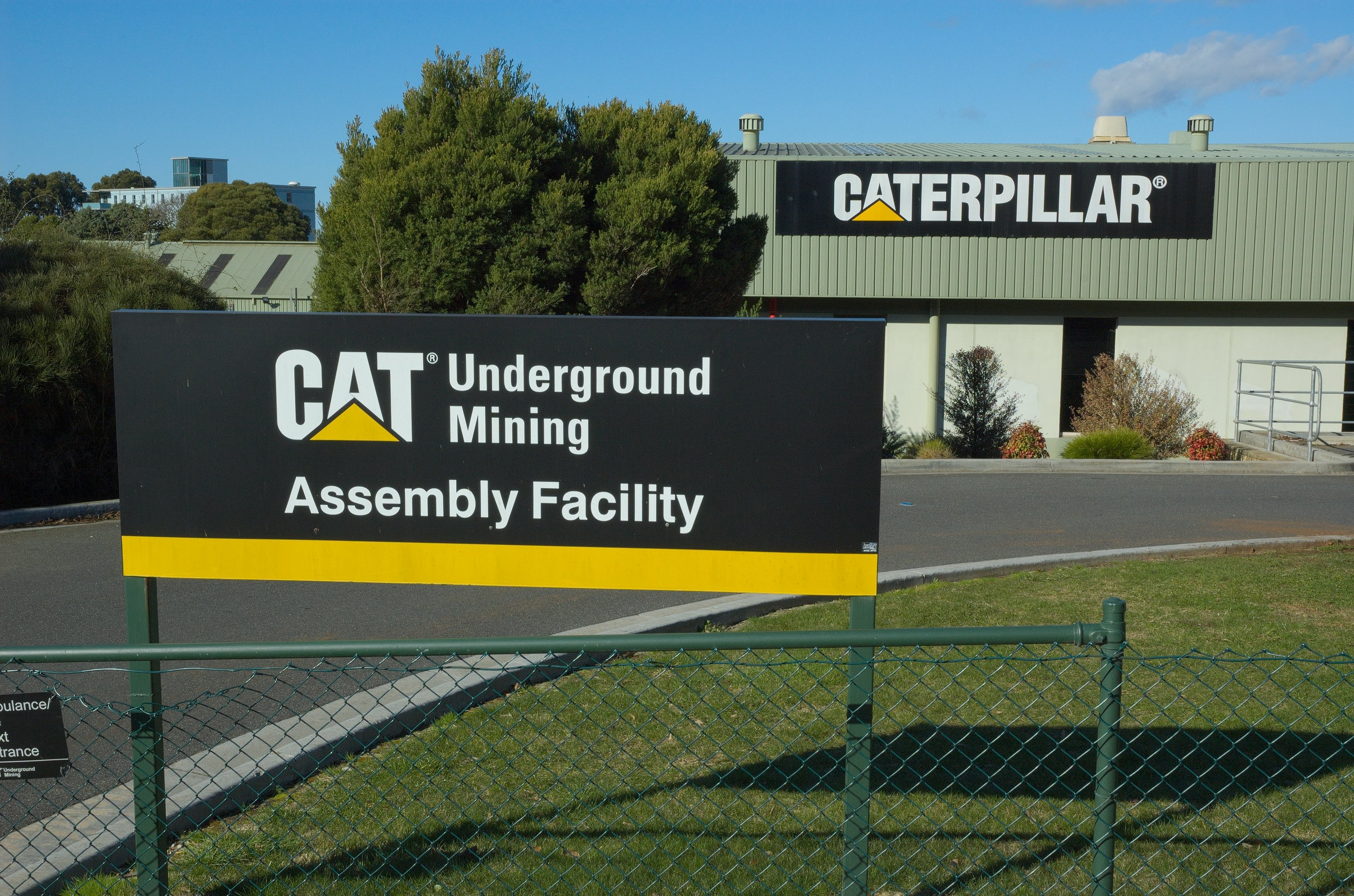
Caterpillar underground mining equipment assembly in Burnie in 2012

In 1995, Elphinstone formed a 50/50 joint venture with Caterpillar, creating Caterpillar Elphinstone Pty Ltd. Under this arrangement, underground hard-rock equipment was manufactured at the Burnie facilities and distributed globally through Caterpillar's dealer network, significantly expanding the company's export footprint and production scale.

Caterpillar exercised an option to acquire the remaining 50% stake in the joint venture in 2000. Following the buyout, manufacturing at Burnie was integrated into Caterpillar's global supply chain and the product line was rebranded under the Caterpillar name. Although product intellectual property and physical plant assets were transferred to Caterpillar, the parent Elphinstone Group entity remained an independent entity in Tasmania, continuing to operate other business ventures, including its William Adams Caterpillar dealership.

In April 2015, Caterpillar announced plans to relocate its hard-rock underground manufacturing from Burnie to a facility in Rayong, Thailand. Completed in 2016, the relocation saw Caterpillar withdraw entirely from Tasmania and eliminated approximately 280 local jobs.

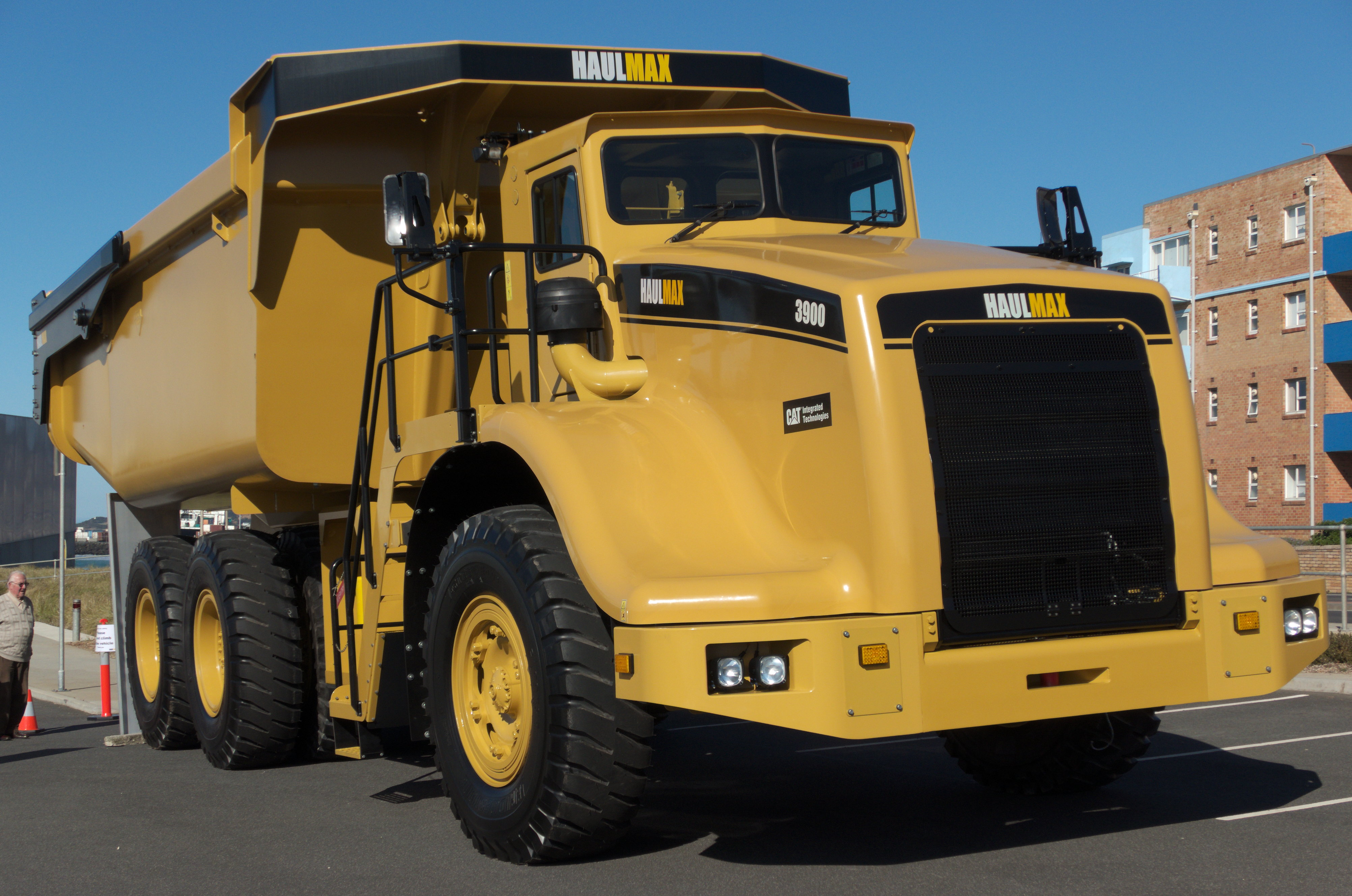
A Haulmax 3900 underground dump truck in Burnie in 2015

=== Return to independent manufacturing (2016–present) ===
After Caterpillar's departure, Elphinstone Group reacquired its north-west Tasmanian manufacturing facilities and re-established itself as an independent OEM. Following site upgrades, the firm subsequently launched a series of modular underground support vehicles, leveraging the technical expertise and established dealer relationships of its former Caterpillar personnel.

In the 2020s, Elphinstone diversified into defense manufacturing and heavy engineering, securing contracts to produce hulls for military vehicles.

== Mining equipment manufacturing ==
Elphinstone produces a modular range of underground utility vehicles, including concrete agitators, service trucks, graders, and water tankers.

Designed for durability and rebuildability in harsh operating environments, the product portfolio also includes off-highway haulage units and specialist machinery for remote sites. While assembly is centered in Tasmania, global distribution continues to be supported by Caterpillar's dealer network.

== Defence manufacturing ==
In 2022, Elphinstone entered the defence industry after securing a contract under the Australian Department of Defence LAND 8116 Phase 1 project. The agreement tasked the company with manufacturing 45 turret and hull assemblies for the Australian Army's AS9 Huntsman self-propelled howitzers and AS10 armoured ammunition resupply vehicles. The contract covers steel fabrication, machining, painting, and ongoing lifecycle sustainment at its Wynyard plant before final vehicle assembly by Hanwha Defence Australia in Geelong.

Elphinstone expanded its military manufacturing in 2025 through an A$90 million contract with Hanwha Defence Australia under LAND 400 Phase 3 to fabricate 129 hull structures for the Redback infantry fighting vehicle.

== Other activities ==
Elphinstone Group holds commercial interests across public transport manufacturing, property development and renewable energy. The acquisition of Southern Prospect established the group's sustainable energy division, which provides microgrids and remote power generation systems. The enterprise also partnered with Bustech in 2018 to assemble bus bodies for Metro Tasmania. Additionally, Elphinstone Group maintains commercial property investments, including regional hospitality developments in Burnie.
