= Dale Elphinstone =

Australian engineer and business executive

Dale Elphinstone AO FTSE
- Born: Dale Brendon Elphinstone; 1951 (age 74–75); Tasmania, Australia
- Education: Ridgley Area School
- Occupations: Engineer, manufacturer, business executive
- Years active: 1975–present
- Employer: Elphinstone Group
- Known for: Founder and executive chairman of the Elphinstone Group
- Title: Executive Chairman
- Board member of: Engenco Ltd; Exergen Pty Ltd
- Spouse: Cheryl Elphinstone
- Children: 3
- Awards: Officer of the Order of Australia (AO); Fellow, Australian Academy of Technological Sciences and Engineering (FTSE); National Mining Hall of Fame (2024)

Dale Brendon Elphinstone AO, FTSE (born 1951) is an Australian engineer, manufacturer and business executive. He is the founder and executive chairman of the Elphinstone Group, a privately held engineering and manufacturing company headquartered in north-west Tasmania.

Elphinstone has been active in Australia’s mining equipment manufacturing sector since the 1970s. His career has included the formation of the Caterpillar Elphinstone joint venture in the 1990s, which was acquired by Caterpillar Inc. in 2000, and the subsequent re-establishment of Elphinstone-branded manufacturing following Caterpillar’s withdrawal from underground equipment production in Burnie, Tasmania.

According to independent wealth rankings, Elphinstone has been listed among Australia’s wealthiest individuals since at least 2010. In 2025, he was ranked 131st on Australia's Richest 250, with an estimated net worth of $1.29 billion.

== Early life and training ==
In 1966, aged 15, he commenced an apprenticeship with William Adams, the Caterpillar dealer for Victoria and Tasmania. After completing his trade qualifications, Elphinstone worked as a field service mechanic at mine sites across Tasmania and King Island. In 1973, he travelled overseas to work with Canadian Caterpillar dealer Finning.

== Business career ==
Elphinstone established Dale B Elphinstone Pty Ltd in 1975, laying the foundations for what later became the Elphinstone Group. The company expanded during the late 1970s and 1980s through the modification and manufacture of underground mining equipment, before entering a joint venture with Caterpillar in the mid-1990s.

Following Caterpillar’s acquisition of the joint venture in 2000, Elphinstone continued his involvement in manufacturing and engineering enterprises. In the mid-2010s, he oversaw the re-establishment of Elphinstone as an independent original equipment manufacturer after Caterpillar relocated underground mining production from Tasmania.

Further detail on the company’s operations and products is covered in the article Elphinstone Group.

== Philanthropy ==
Elphinstone has been involved in philanthropic activities, particularly within regional Tasmania. Reported contributions have included funding for medical imaging and radiation therapy equipment, delivered in partnership with the Tasmanian Government, as well as support for scholarships and community organisations.

== Awards and recognition ==
Elphinstone was elected a Fellow of the Australian Academy of Technological Sciences and Engineering in 2003.

In the 2019 Queen’s Birthday Honours, he was appointed an Officer of the Order of Australia (AO) for distinguished service to business and philanthropy in the manufacturing and resources sectors.

In 2024, Elphinstone was inducted into the National Mining Hall of Fame and Museum in Denver, Colorado.

== Wealth ==
In 2010, the Australian Broadcasting Corporation reported that Elphinstone ranked among Australia’s wealthiest individuals on the BRW Rich List, with an estimated net worth of $515 million.

In 2025, he was ranked 131st on Australia’s Richest 250, with an estimated net worth of $1.29 billion, according to Matthews Australasia Media.

== Sources ==
- National Mining Hall of Fame No. 270: Dale B. Elphinstone. YouTube. National Mining Hall of Fame and Museum.
