= Michael Heine =

Australian businessman

- Born: c. 1949 (age 76–77)
- Occupation: Businessman
- Board member of: Netwealth
- Father: Walter Heine
- Relatives: Leslier Hine (brother)

Michael Heine (born c. 1949) is an Australian businessman and billionaire. He is best known as the founder and managing director of Netwealth, an ASX-listed funds management and financial technology firm established in 1999. Heine was previously involved in various other ventures with his father, Walter, and brother, Leslie, including Heine Brothers, Heine Management, Heine Finance, and Eurolynx.

== Early life ==
Heine is the son of Walter Heine, who was born in Leipzig, Germany, into a family of textile merchants. His father moved to the United Kingdom in the 1930s to escape antisemitism and was subsequently sent to Australia as an enemy alien aboard HMT Dunera. In 1946 Walter Heine established Heine Brothers (Australasia) Pty Ltd, which initially focused on food processing but later engaged in commodities trading.

Initially joining the family business after leaving high school, Heine did not pursue further upper education.

== Career ==
After their father's death in 1978, Heine and his brother, Leslie, inherited the family company. Heine briefly moved to England to run an investment company, Heine Bros England, that was liquidated in 1981. The brothers subsequently expanded into property management, as Heine Management, and investment and mortgage finance, as Heine Finance.

In 1986, the Heine brothers publicly listed their holding company Eurolynx, retaining a 25 percent stake. In the same year, Eurolynx bought Wheatley Communications, which held several radio station licences in New South Wales and Victoria, for A$90 million from Heine's friend Glenn Wheatley. It was quickly onsold to Hoyts for A$130 million and renamed Hoyts Media, but the nominal profit was eventually reversed following a revaluation as Eurolynx maintained a 25 percent holding. In 1993 Heine Management bought Australia's then-tallest building, 120 Collins Street, for A$286 million.

In 1999 Heine sold his shares in Heine Management to Mercantile Mutual, a subsidiary of ING, for A$112 million. He used the proceeds to establish Netwealth "with a handful of staff and a business plan to build an online platform for financial advisers to manage their clients' investments on offering dozens of products with state-of-the-art technology". It reportedly took five or six years to break even. In 2017, he listed Netwealth on the Australian Stock Exchange and its share price rose 44 percent on the first day of trading.

=== Net worth ===
In 1990, the Australian Financial Review assessed that Michael and Leslie Heine had a combined net worth of A$140 million. In 2018, Michael Heine became a billionaire with net worth of A$1.27 billion, according to the Financial Review Rich List. As of May 2025, his net worth was assessed at A$4.36 billion.

Year	Financial Review Rich List		Forbes Australia's 50 Richest	
Year	Rank	Net worth (A$)	Rank	Net worth (US$)
2018	58 ▲	$1.27 billion ▲		
2019	57 ▲	$1.55 billion ▲		
2020	53 ▲	$1.83 billion ▲		
2021	33 ▲	$2.79 billion ▲		
2022	38 ▼	$2.80 billion ▲		
2023	42 ▼	$2.67 billion ▼		
2024	33 ▲	$3.83 billion ▲		
2025	36 ▼	$4.36 billion ▲		

Legend
Icon	Description
Steady	Has not changed from the previous year
▲	Has increased from the previous year
▼	Has decreased from the previous year
