= Melanie Perkins =

Australian technology entrepreneur (born 1987)

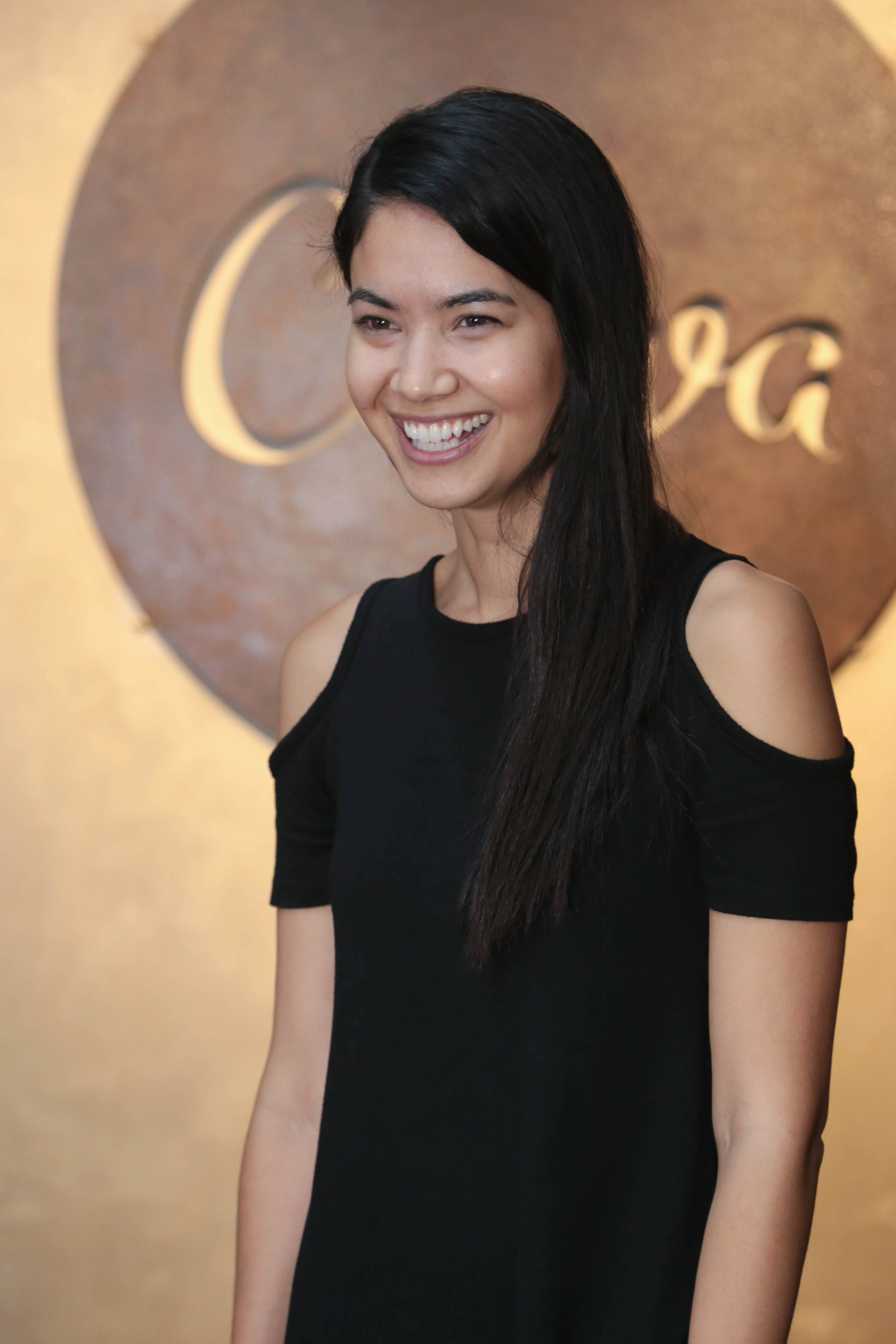
- Perkins in 2019
- Born: 1987 (age 38–39); Perth, Western Australia
- Education: University of Western Australia
- Occupation: Technology entrepreneur
- Years active: 2007–present
- Known for: Co-founder and CEO of Canva
- Spouse: Cliff Obrecht (m. 2021)

Melanie Perkins (born 1987) is an Australian technology entrepreneur. She is best known for co-founding Canva, an online graphic design platform, with Cliff Obrecht and Cameron Adams. She serves as the company's chief executive officer. Perkins previously co-founded Fusion Books, a web-based yearbook publisher.

Under Perkins, Canva expanded from an online design tool into a visual communications platform offering workplace and artificial intelligence products. She and Obrecht have pledged most of their wealth to philanthropic causes through the Canva Foundation.

== Childhood ==
Perkins was born in 1987 in Perth, Western Australia, to an Australian-born mother who worked as a teacher and a Malaysian engineer of Filipino and Sri Lankan heritage. She attended Sacred Heart College, a secondary school located in the northern Perth suburb of Sorrento. While at high school, Perkins trained seriously in figure skating and started a small business selling handmade scarves.

After high school, Perkins enrolled at the University of Western Australia, majoring in communications, psychology and commerce. At this time, Perkins was also a private tutor for students learning graphic design. Perkins has said the slow learning curve of traditional design tools prompted her to explore simpler, web-based alternatives. She left university at age 19 to pursue a startup with Cliff Obrecht.

== Career ==
=== Fusion Books ===
In 2007, Perkins and Obrecht founded Fusion Books, which let schools create yearbooks using an online drag-and-drop editor and template library. The business grew in Australia and later operated in New Zealand and France.

=== Canva ===
In 2013, Perkins spent several months in San Francisco seeking venture-capital funding for a broader online design platform. Perkins and Obrecht were rejected by more than 100 investors, with concerns including their location in Australia, their romantic relationship and their lack of technical backgrounds. Through Google Maps co-creator Lars Rasmussen, who advised the project, they were introduced to former Google designer Cameron Adams, who joined in 2012 as Canva's third co-founder and chief product officer. After an investor advised the founders to appoint a single leader, Obrecht nominated Perkins as chief executive. Blackbird Ventures became the first major institutional investor, and the company also received a matching grant from the Australian government. The founders moved from Perth to Sydney to recruit technical talent, and Canva launched publicly in 2013.

Perkins used annual company priorities to sequence Canva's expansion. Internationalisation was the priority in 2016, when the platform launched in six languages in addition to English. In 2017, she prioritised a rewrite of Canva's editor code base, which later enabled products including video editing. Canva reported positive free cash flow annually from 2017. In September 2022, the company announced a suite of professional and workplace tools intended to compete with products from Adobe, Google and Microsoft.

In 2024, Perkins described Canva's increased focus on enterprise customers and generative artificial intelligence. That year, Canva acquired the professional design software company Affinity and the text-to-image company Leonardo.Ai, and introduced the AI image generator Dream Lab. In April 2025, Perkins introduced Canva Code, a generative-AI tool for creating interactive elements, and Canva Sheets. At the time, Fortune reported that Canva had 230 million users and annual revenue of US$3 billion.

== Philanthropy ==
Perkins and Obrecht joined the Giving Pledge in 2021, committing to donate most of their wealth through the Canva Foundation. The foundation partnered with GiveDirectly on unconditional cash transfers in Malawi. An additional four-year commitment of US$100 million announced in October 2025 brought the couple's total commitment to the programme to US$150 million. The foundation has also supported programmes for early-years literacy and numeracy in sub-Saharan Africa and South Asia.

In July 2026, Perkins and Obrecht launched the Global Goals Platform, an initiative intended to survey people internationally about the changes they most wanted to see in their communities and the world, to help inform the foundation's future grantmaking.

== Recognition ==
In 2016, Forbes included Perkins in its 30 Under 30 Asia list for enterprise technology. Fortune ranked her 56th on its 2026 Most Powerful Women list.

== Personal life ==
Perkins and Obrecht married in January 2021 on Rottnest Island.

As of May 2025, the Australian Financial Review assessed Perkins' and Obrecht's joint net worth as A$14.14 billion. As of August 2026, Forbes estimated Perkins' net worth at US$7.6 billion.
