= Bob Ell =

Australian property developer

- Born: William Robert Ell circa 1946 (age 79–80); Lakemba, New South Wales
- Occupation: Property developer
- Spouses: Barbara Ell (div.); Bridget Ell
- Children: 7

William Robert ("Bob") Ell (born 22 December 1946) is an Australian property developer and businessman with interests in residential, retail, commercial and industrial property.

== Biography ==
Ell, a former carpenter who was born in Merriwa, New South Wales, founded Leda Group, a privately owned property development company in 1976. The company's head office is located in Sydney, and it has business interests in Queensland, New South Wales and the Australian Capital Territory. Included in Ell's property portfolio are residential developments at Pimpama, Queensland; and at Cobaki Lakes, and Kings Forest, both in far north New South Wales. He has raised plans to develop a cruise ship terminal, including three liner berths plus a superyacht marina, three resorts and an option for a casino at Tugun. Ell has commercial property interests in shopping centres at Ipswich Riverlink, Victoria Point and Morayfield in Queensland; and at the Tuggeranong Hyperdome in Canberra. In 2012 it was reported that Leda had developed properties worth a total of more than A$3 billion since Ell established the group in 1976.

Ell floated Leda on the Australian Securities Exchange in the late 1980s and privatised the company in 1990.

In 2009 it was reported that Ell acted as a surety for Michael McGurk and provided A$100,000 in bail for firebombing and assault charges against McGurk; with the charges subsequently dropped. Following the 2009 murder of McGurk, Ell issued a statement detailing his business and personal relationship with McGurk. According to media reports, McGurk had been negotiating on behalf of Ell and for business associates of nightclub identity John Ibrahim to run the downstairs bar area of the Crest in return for an investment of $10–$15 million. In addition, Ell had been a potential sponsor of a proposed western Sydney A-League soccer team, in a deal brokered in 2009 by McGurk. Ell had a longstanding dispute with Greens Tweed Shire councillor Katie Milne where he successfully sued her for defamation in the NSW Supreme Court, and was awarded A$15,000 in damages. The defamation action related to an email sent by Milne alleging he had a scandalous association with McGurk.

In 2012, Ell sought and was granted permission by the Privileges Committee of the New South Wales Legislative Council to lodge a Citizen's Right of Reply on behalf of Leda Holdings. The reply related to comments by Cate Faehrmann MLC, a member of the NSW Greens, in the Legislative Council on 9 November 2011. Ell's reply highlighted errors of fact and distortions contained in Faehrmann's speech. The Privileges Committee ordered that the Citizen's Right of Reply be published.

== Personal life ==
Ell is married to Brigit, twenty-six years younger than Ell, and they have four children William, John, Charles and Tiffiany. Ell has a son, and two daughters from his first marriage to Barbara. Ell resides both on the Gold Coast and in Sydney, with an additional residence in Noosa Heads.

=== Wealth rankings ===
In 2014, the Business Review Weekly assessed Ell's net worth at A$1.29 billion; and Forbes Asia assessed his net worth at A$1.10 billion. In February 2013, Ell listed for sale a 4,397-square-metre (47,330 sq ft) residential property in Cremorne with an asking price of between A$20 – 25 million. In July the same year, Ell sold his Potts Point penthouse apartment for A$15 million and purchased a non-waterfront house in Bellevue Hill for A$30 million twelve months later. It was reported between 2000 and 2002 that Ell owned a luxury 36-metre (118 ft) catamaran called Leda worth A$15 million. As of May 2025, The Australian Financial Review Rich List, that superseded the BRW Rich 200, estimated Ell's net worth as A$2.48 billion.

Year	Financial Review Rich List		Forbes Australia's 50 Richest	
Year	Rank	Net worth ($A)	Rank	Net worth (US$)
2010		$1.10 billion ▲	n/a	not listed
2011	27 ▲	$1.20 billion ▲	n/a	not listed
2012	28 ▼	$1.14 billion ▼	n/a	not listed
2013	32 ▼	$1.13 billion ▼	26 ▲	$0.96 billion ▲
2014	25 ▲	$1.29 billion ▲	22 ▲	$1.10 billion ▲
2015			19 ▲	$1.20 billion ▲
2016			23 ▼	$1.20 billion
2017		$1.52 billion	28 ▼	
2018	48 ▲	$1.56 billion ▲		
2019	44 ▲	$1.84 billion ▲	30 ▲	$1.42 billion ▲
2020	47 ▼	$1.98 billion ▲		
2021	55 ▼	$1.98 billion		
2022	46 ▲	$2.40 billion ▲		
2023	48 ▼	$2.43 billion ▲		
2024	49 ▼	$2.68 billion ▲		
2025	65 ▼	$2.48 billion ▼		

Legend
Icon	Description
Steady	Has not changed from the previous year
▲	Has increased from the previous year
▼	Has decreased from the previous year
