= Nick Politis =

Australian businessman and rugby league administrator

Nick Politis AM
- Born: Nicholas George Politis; 25 August 1944 (age 82); Kythira, Greece
- Other names: The Godfather; Uncle Nick
- Education: Ipswich Grammar School
- Alma mater: University of Queensland
- Occupation: Businessman
- Years active: 1974–present
- Board member of: Sydney Roosters; Eagers Automotive; WFM Motors; Motor Traders' Association of NSW
- Awards: Member of the Order of Australia; Greek-Australian Sports Hall of Fame

Nicholas George Politis AM (born 25 August 1944) is a Greek-born Australian businessman and chairman of the Sydney Roosters in the National Rugby League (NRL) competition. Politis is also responsible for the first sponsorship on a professional rugby league team's jersey.

== Early life ==
Politis was born in Kythira, Greece. In the late 1940s, Politis and his family immigrated to Australia, settling in Ipswich, Queensland. The family moved to the town of Blackall, living there for a number of years before returning to Ipswich. Politis attended Ipswich Grammar School for his final four years of high school, graduating in 1962. In 1964, he graduated from the University of Queensland.

== Business interests ==
Politis ran and expanded WFM Motors Pty Ltd from March 1974, rebranding its marketing name as City Ford and transforming it into one of the largest Ford dealerships in Australia. The business has been sponsors of the Roosters since 1976, when the club set a new precedent of having major sponsors' names appearing on their jerseys – making Politis the first sponsor in rugby league. As controlling shareholder of Australian Health Care Ltd., he was responsible for its failed sorties into the Australian hospital market, including the celebrated LaTrobe Regional Hospital fiasco, where tens of millions were lost in disastrous contract management.

In March 2014, Politis' NGP Investments (No.2) purchased Barloworld's Australian car sales business for $130 million.

In 2016, Politis sold the site of his Thomson Ford business in Parramatta to property developer Dyldham for an estimated $70 million.

== Sydney Roosters ==
Since May 30, 1993, Politis has been the chairman of the Sydney Roosters. After the Roosters won the 2002 NRL Grand Final, he joined the players in getting a premiership logo tattooed on his arm. He has been described as being ranked "among the most powerful, influential and ruthless figures in rugby league since taking over as Roosters chairman". Politis is sometimes affectionately known as "The Godfather" or "Uncle Nick".

Politis was responsible for getting Sonny Bill Williams to return to rugby league with the Roosters after his five-year ban from the NRL, for walking-out on the Bulldogs mid-season in 2008, expired in 2013. Politis reportedly made a handshake agreement with Williams to this effect years prior. According to prominent player agent, Sam Ayoub, "there’s no doubt Sonny would not have returned to the NRL if not for Nick Politis." That year, the Roosters achieved the trifecta of winning the minor premiership, NRL premiership and World Club Challenge.

Politis was chairman when the Roosters won back-to-back premierships in 2018, 2019 and 2026

== Personal life ==
His father was a vet in his homeland of Greece, before moving to Australia. Politis is a member of the Greek-Australian Sports Hall of Fame. In 2014, Politis was appointed a Member of the Member of the Order of Australia (AM) for significant service to rugby league football as an administrator.

=== Net worth ===
Politis first appeared in the BRW magazine Rich 200 in 2010 when his net worth was estimated at A$182 million. In 2017, the list was rebranded as the Financial Review Rich List. As of May 2025, Politis' net worth was assessed at A$2.58 billion.

Year	Financial Review Rich List		Forbes Australia's 50 Richest	
Year	Rank	Net worth (A$)	Rank	Net worth (US$)
2010		$182 million		
2011				
2012				
2013		$200 million		
2014	117	$410 million ▲		
2015				
2016	86 ▲	$594 million ▲		
2017		$733 million ▲		
2018	55 ▲	$1.35 billion ▲		
2019	74 ▼	$1.23 billion ▼		
2020	79 ▼	$1.31 billion ▲		
2021	54 ▲	$2.02 billion ▲		
2022	50 ▲	$2.20 billion ▲		
2023	58 ▼	$2.14 billion ▼		
2024	60 ▼	$2.36 billion ▲		
2025	64 ▼	$2.58 billion ▲		

Legend
Icon	Description
Steady	Has not changed from the previous year
▲	Has increased from the previous year
▼	Has decreased from the previous year

== See also ==
- List of NRL club owners
