= Reece Group =

Australian company

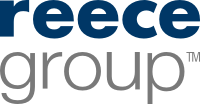

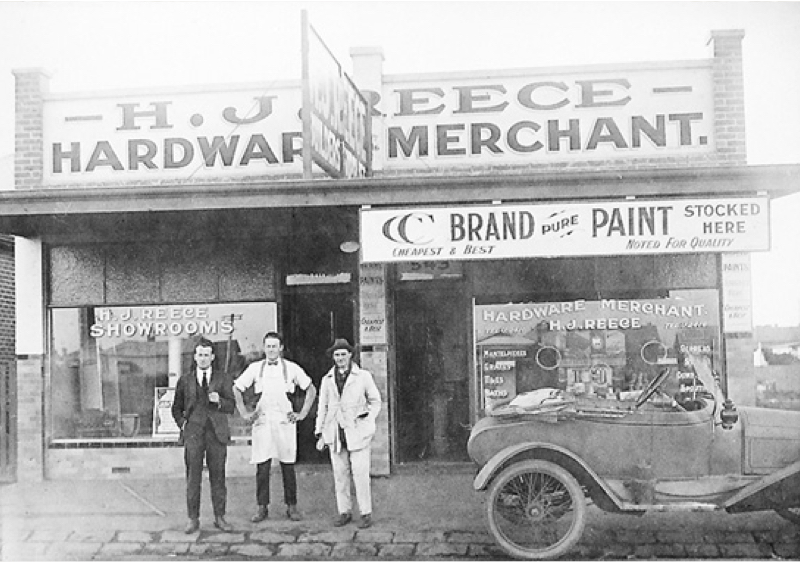
- First Reece store in Caufield, 1920
- Type: Public
- Traded as: ASX: REH
- Industry: Retail
- Founded: 1920; 106 years ago
- Headquarters: Cremorne, Victoria, Australia
- Number of locations: 800
- Area served: Australia; New Zealand; United States
- Products: Plumbing and bathroom supplies
- Revenue: A$9.0 billion (2025)
- Number of employees: 9000+
- Website: reecegroup.com.au

Reece Limited is a public Australian company, and the country's largest supplier of plumbing and bathroom supplies.

Established in 1920, the company has businesses focused on the plumbing, bathroom, building, civil, irrigation, heating, air conditioning and refrigeration industries.

Reece employs approximately 8,000 people and operates 800 branches that supply more than 300,000 products.

The company is 70% owned by the Wilson Family.

== History ==
In 1920, Harold Joseph Reece began selling plumbing products from the back of his truck and later opened the first HJ Reece store in Caulfield. In 1958 Les Wilson was offered a seat on the board and gradually began buying shares in the business.

By 1969, the Wilson family was approaching a controlling stake in HJ Reece. On 20 July, regulators approved the Wilson family becoming majority shareholders of the company. In 1970, Les Wilson's son, Alan Wilson, who started Austral Hardware almost a decade earlier with the support of his father, became CEO of HJ Reece and later consolidated the two companies. Alan Wilson became executive chairman in 2008, and his son, Peter Wilson, succeeded him as CEO.

In May 2018, Reece announced the acquisition of U.S. based competitor MORSCO for $1.9 billion.
