= Subiaco Oval =

Former stadium in Perth, Western Australia

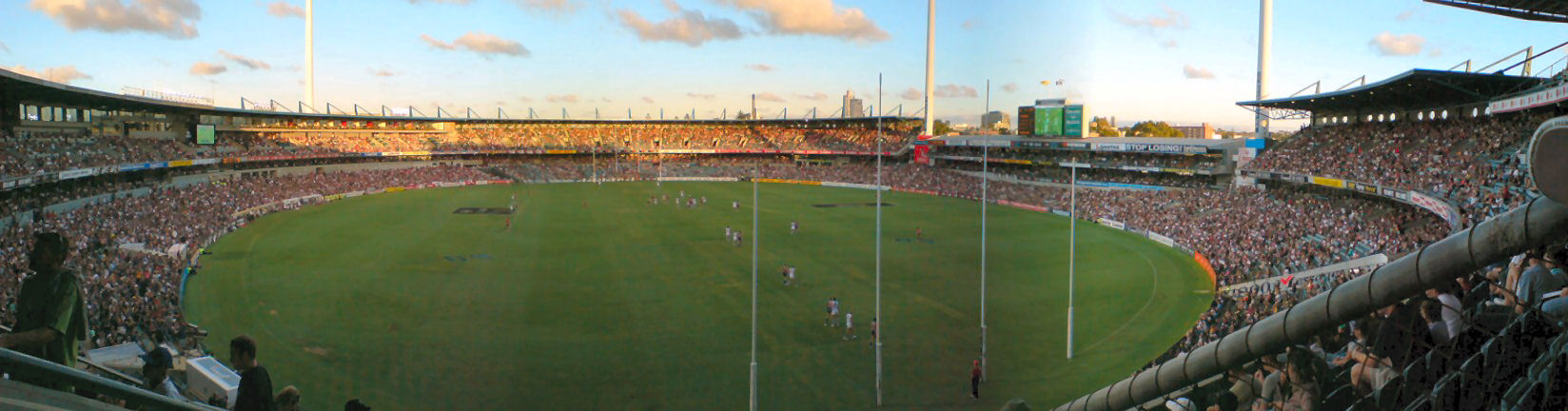
- Interactive map of Subiaco Oval
- Former names: Mueller Park, Patersons Stadium, Domain Stadium
- Location: Roberts Road, Subiaco, Western Australia
- Coordinates: 31°56′40″S 115°49′48″E
- Owner: Government of Western Australia
- Operator: West Australian Football Commission
- Capacity: 43,082
- Surface: Grass
- Record attendance: Concerts: 65,000 (Adele Live 2017); Sports: 52,781 (1979 WANFL Grand Final)

Construction
- Groundbreaking: 1908
- Opened: 1908
- Closed: 2017
- Demolished: 2019
- Cost: 1991 rebuild – A$45 million
- Architect: Various

Tenants
- West Coast Eagles (AFL) (1987–2017) (Note: West Coast Eagles also utilised Subiaco Oval as their training and administrative headquarters from 1987 to 2019.); Fremantle Football Club (AFL) (1995–2017); Subiaco Football Club (WAFL) (1908–2004); Western Force (Super Rugby) (2006–2009); Perth Glory (A-League) (2012)

Western Australia Heritage Register
- Type: State Registered Place
- Designated: 14 August 2019
- Reference no.: 11923

Subiaco Oval (nicknamed Subi) was a sports stadium in Perth, Western Australia, located in the suburb of Subiaco. It was opened in 1908 and closed in 2017 after the completion of the new Perth Stadium in Burswood.

Subiaco Oval was the highest-capacity stadium in Western Australia and one of the main stadiums in Australia, with a final capacity of 43,500 people. It began as the home ground for the Subiaco Football Club, and from the 1930s onward was the home of Australian rules football in Western Australia. It hosted the annual grand final of the West Australian Football League (WAFL), with the ground record attendance of 52,781 set at the 1979 Grand Final. It later served as the home ground of the West Coast Eagles and the Fremantle Football Club, the two Perth teams in the Australian Football League (AFL). Other events included Socceroos International Friendly Game in 2005, Perth Glory soccer games (including two National Soccer League grand finals), Western Force rugby games, International rules football matches, special National Rugby League fixtures and rock concerts. Under naming rights the stadium was known as Patersons Stadium (2011–2014) and Domain Stadium (2015–2017) in its final years.

The demolition of the stadium was completed in November 2019, though the oval playing surface was retained as part of the school grounds of Bob Hawke College. The refurbished oval was opened to the general public in June 2020.

== Ground structure ==
The ground was first built in 1908, at which point it was known as Mueller Park. In 1969 a three-tier stand was constructed at the western end of the stadium, and in 1981 a two-tier stand on the members' wing was completed. A further redevelopment came in 1995 with the opening of the new two-tier Town & Country Stand (later renamed ANZ Stand and NAB Stand) opposite the members' wing. In 1997, light towers were installed at the ground. The last redevelopment, which converted the stadium into an all-seat venue with a capacity of approximately 43,500 was completed in 1999 at a cost of A$35 million.

The three-tier stand was named the Orr-Simons-Hill stand, in honour of three leading figures in the history of WAFL (then known as WANFL). This was proudly and prominently displayed on the exterior western face of the stand right up until the early 1990s, when it was replaced with the logo of a commercial sponsor. There was a small plaque remembering the original naming of the stand, mounted in one of the stairwells, and each tier had a sign on the back interior wall; for example, the first (ground) tier is the R. W. Hill Tier, and the second is the W. R. Orr Tier. (W. R. Orr was secretary of the WANFL in 1932, R. W. Hill was captain of West Perth in 1940 and 1941, and secretary of the WANFL in 1968). The ground was floodlit by four lighting towers.

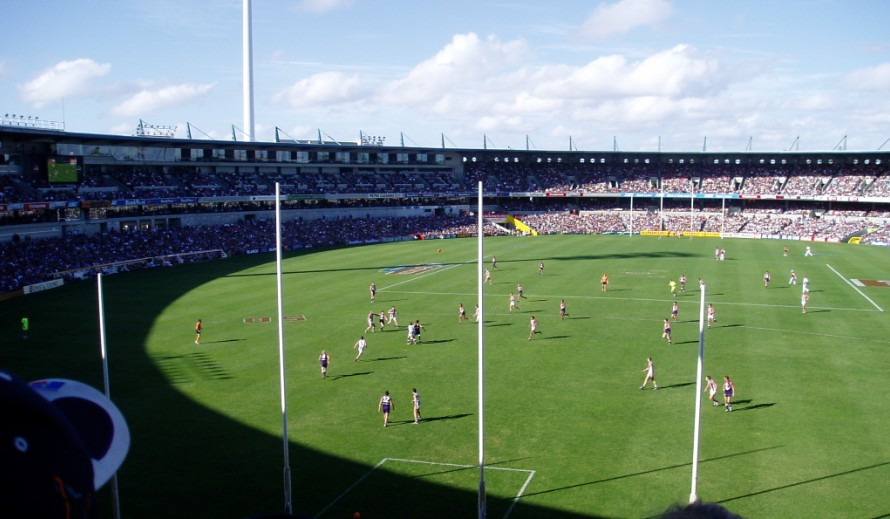
Subiaco Oval from the three tier stand during a football game

=== Ground dimensions ===
AFL playing surface:

- Length: 175 m (574.15 ft)
- Width: 122 m (400.26 ft)
- Goals run east to west

Fence to fence

- Length: 191 m (626.64 ft)
- Width: 132 m (433.07 ft)

Subiaco Oval was the longest ground in the AFL competition, with visiting interstate teams often having to adjust their playing style accordingly. Between 2000 and 2017, the ground was sometimes referred to as "The House of Pain", with many visiting teams losing by lopsided scores.

== Ground naming rights ==
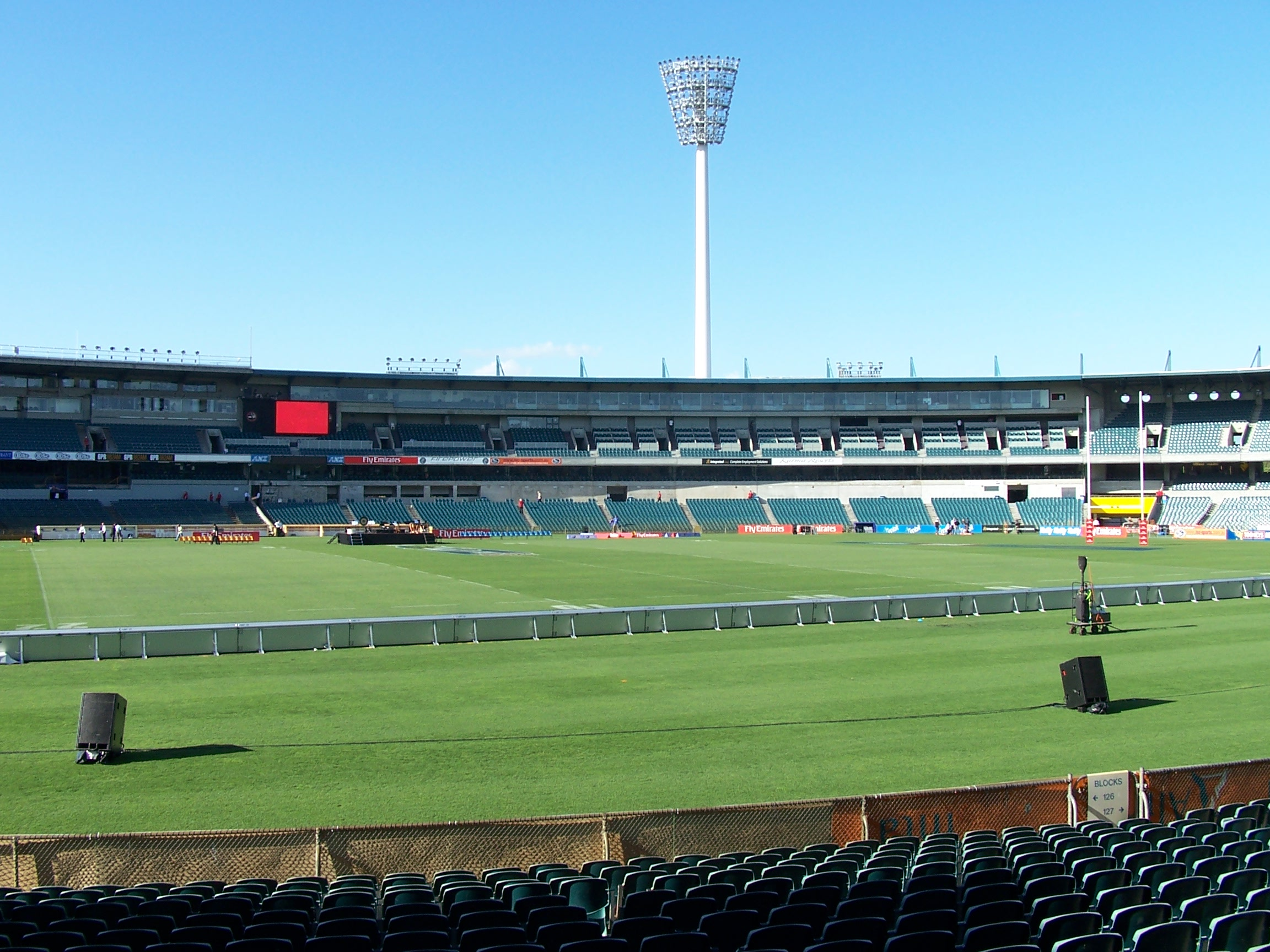
Subiaco Oval being configured for a Super 14 match in 2006.

In 2003, the retail telecommunications company Crazy John's controversially attempted to buy the naming rights to the ground, but the bid was denied by the local Subiaco council, which refused planning permission for advertising signs on the stadium's exterior. In May 2005, a non-commercial name change was being considered; the proposal to rename to 'ANZAC Field' was put forward by the West Australian Football Commission, but rejected by the Minister for Veterans Affairs, De-Anne Kelly, as Anzac is a federally protected word. In October 2010, Perth-based stockbroker Patersons Securities bought the naming rights, and the name of the ground was changed to Patersons Stadium. The Western Australian Football Commission accepted it and said it would put money back into all levels of football.

In February 2015, real estate company the Domain Group took over naming rights, and the ground was subsequently renamed Domain Stadium. The deal lasted for three years, the period of time before the new Perth Stadium opened in 2018.

== As a music venue ==
Subiaco Oval has been the venue of major music concerts. These include:

- Elton John – 16 October 1971
- The Bee Gees – 4 February 1972
- Duke Ellington and His Orchestra – 5 February 1972
- Led Zeppelin – 16 February 1972
- Slade - 31 January 1973
- Santana – 10 February 1976
- Genesis – 6 December 1986
- Australian Made – 10 January 1987
- Billy Joel – 16 February 1991
- Dire Straits - 23 November 1991
- Paul McCartney – 5 March 1993
- Elton John & Billy Joel – 4 March 1998
- Rumba Festival – 3 December 2002
- Eagles – 11 November 2004
- Rod Stewart & Bryan Adams – 26 February 2005
- Neil Diamond – 19 March 2005
- Pearl Jam – 25 November 2006
- Robbie Williams – 30 November and 1 December 2006
- Bon Jovi – 25 January 2008 - 28,790 people (attendance)
- André Rieu – 22 November 2008
- AC/DC – 6 and 8 March 2010
- Bon Jovi – 8 December 2010 - 29,644 people (attendance)
- U2 – 18 and 19 December 2010
- Summadayze – 6 January 2013
- Origin NYE Festival – 31 December 2014
- One Direction – 20 February 2015 - 28,968 people (attendance)
- Fleetwood Mac – 30 October 2015
- AC/DC – 27 and 29 November 2015
- Guns N' Roses – 21 February 2017
- Adele – 28 February 2017

Due to its large size and oval shape, the venue was not well suited to music concerts and was known to have very poor acoustics. It was often chosen for large concerts because there were no other venues of comparable capacity in Perth.

== Transport ==
The oval was served by Subiaco and West Leederville stations, which were upgraded to handle more passengers. Special bus services were run for football matches and other special events. After 2007, tickets to AFL games included free travel on buses and trains for three hours before and after the game. That increased the proportion of football fans using public transport from 23.4% to 32.6%, with Dockers fans more likely to do so than Eagles fans. The completion of the Mandurah railway line was expected to increase public transport patronage to the ground, by replacing buses from south of the river with faster and larger trains.

== Pre-demolition proposals ==
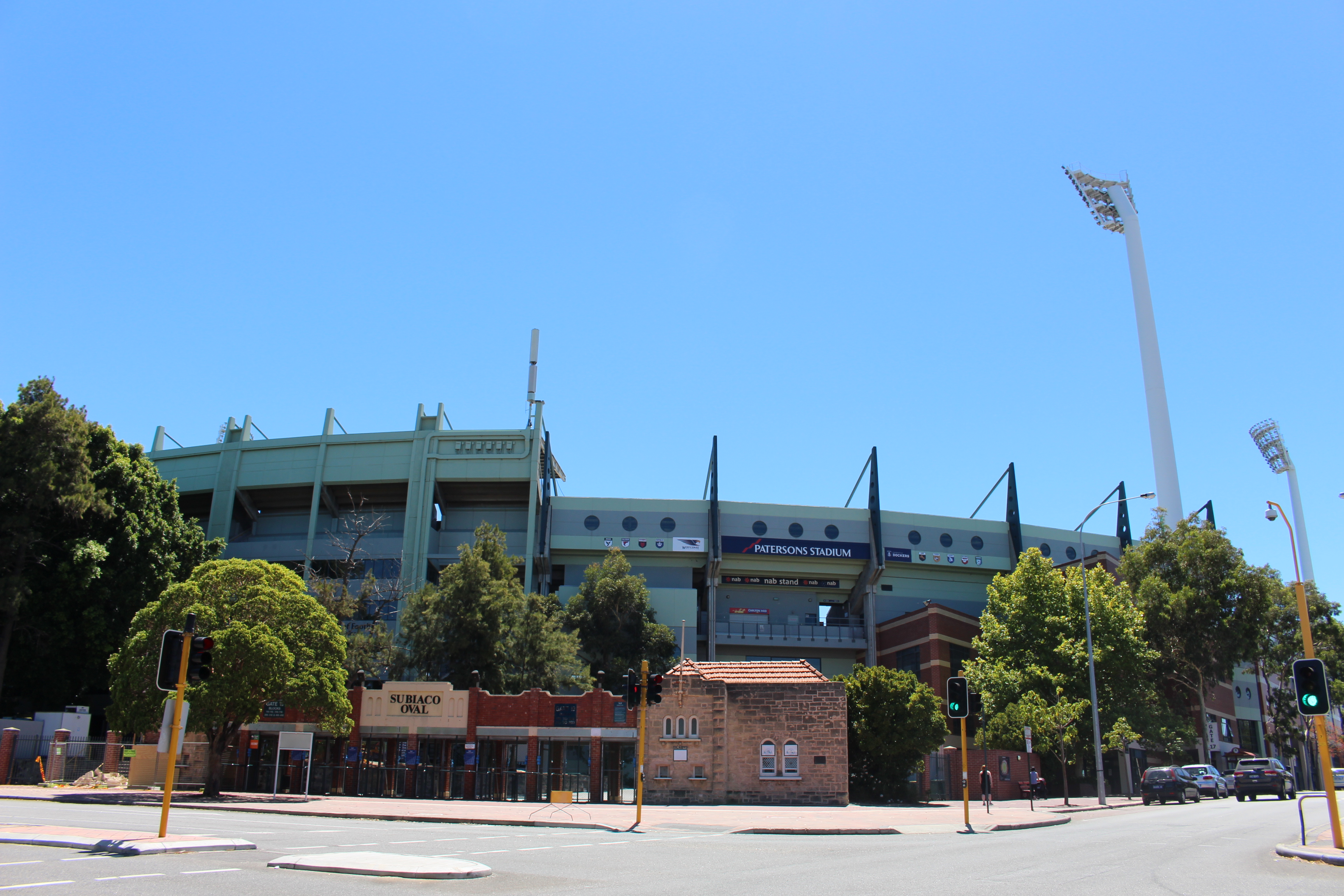
Subiaco Oval entrance from Roberts Road showing the gates that were retained from demolition

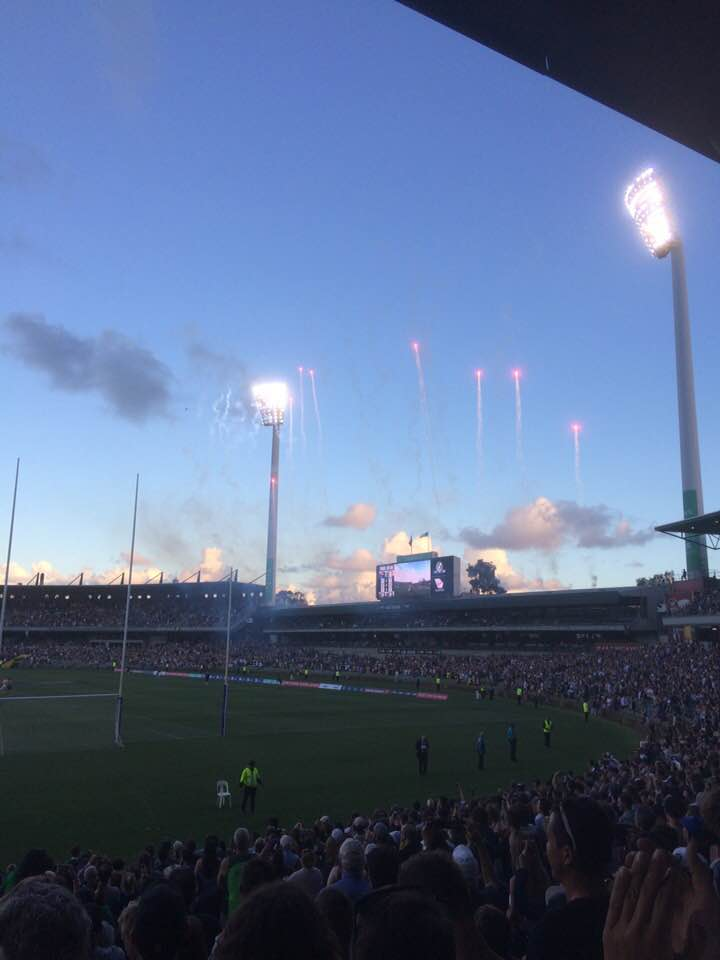
The aftermath of the final event held at Subiaco Oval - an International Rules Series match between Australia and Ireland on 18 November 2017

In 2005 the West Australian Football Commission released a $235 million plan (excluding transport infrastructure or land acquisitions) to increase the stadium to a 60,000 seat venue in a staged project. However, this proposal became a matter of significant debate in Western Australia. Although the demand for a larger stadium was undeniable (in 2005 the West Coast Eagles had 42,000 season ticket holders in a 43,500-seat stadium), the option of developing and expanding Subiaco in order to meet this higher demand was called into question. An alternative plan was tabled for the construction of a new stadium which would seat 70,000 and have retractable seating to cater for rectangular field codes, and appeared to be the lead candidate. Others argued that it may be more cost effective to re-develop Subiaco to 60,000 seats, and redevelop Perth Oval, a small rectangular stadium in Perth, to 35,000 seats to cater for rectangular field sports.

The Government of Western Australia had already commenced development of a major stadia review project in late 2003 which led to much interest in the future of major sporting venues in Western Australia. A major stadia taskforce was appointed in early 2005 and released the Perth major stadium interim report in June 2006. The taskforce delivered its final report in May 2007, which recommended the construction of a new 60,000-seat stadium at either Kitchener Park (which adjoins Subiaco Oval) or in East Perth, suitable for Australian rules football, cricket and also rectangular-field sports such as rugby. It recommended against the further development of Subiaco Oval, which would be demolished.

In July 2007 the Government of Western Australia announced its preference to build a new 60,000-seat stadium rather than re-develop Subiaco Oval. Early the following year, the Government confirmed that Subiaco Oval would be demolished for the new Perth super-stadium to be built at the adjacent Kitchener Park. The new 60,000-seat stadium would be built between 2011 and 2016, with the majority of the stadium being completed in 2014. Subiaco Oval was set to be demolished between 2014 and 2016 to allow the end of construction on the new stadium.

Following the election of a new state Liberal party government, Premier Colin Barnett, announced in February 2009 that, in light of the state's deteriorating finances, his government had scrapped plans for a new outdoor stadium. He stated that a new stadium, including an alternative proposal to redevelop Subiaco Oval, would not be considered for at least two years. However, in December 2009 he announced that he wanted to demolish Subiaco Oval and build a new stadium so Perth can host soccer World Cup games in 2018 or 2022. He stated that this would involve a complete demolition of the old stadium and the building of an entirely new stadium on the site, and suggested this would likely cost well in excess of $450 million.

== Demolition ==
Any plans to redevelop Subiaco Oval were abandoned in June 2011, when the Premier announced the government's decision to proceed with development of a new major stadium on the Burswood Peninsula, known as Perth Stadium, to have a capacity of 60,000 seats.

In June 2017 the McGowan Government announced plans to build a new high school at Kitchener Park next to Subiaco Oval with the playing surface of the grounds to be used as a recreational facility. The new school, which opened in February 2020, is named Bob Hawke College. The government revealed the demolition would retain the oval playing surface, in its existing dimensions, for school and community use. Demolition of the grandstands began in July 2019 and included the removal of the stadium's highly visible light-towers which had been in operation since 1997. The iconic entrance gates to the stadium at Gate 19 were retained for commemorative purposes. The video screen above the Southern Stand was dismantled and sold to the Penrith Panthers in 2018 and reerected at Penrith Stadium. The demolition of the stadium was completed in November 2019.

== Current oval ==
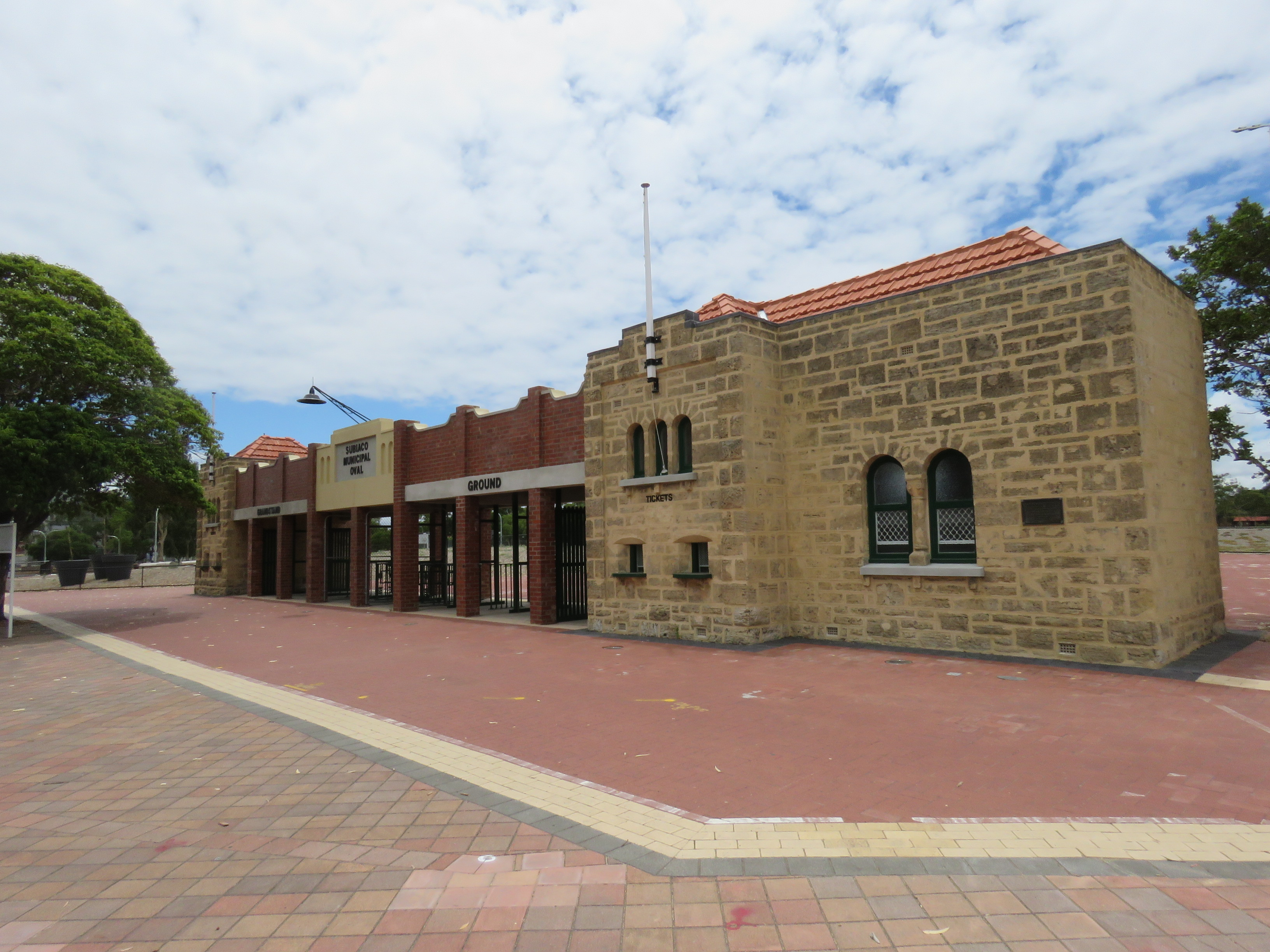
The heritage listed Subiaco Oval Gates in 2021, with the stadium that was once beyond them gone

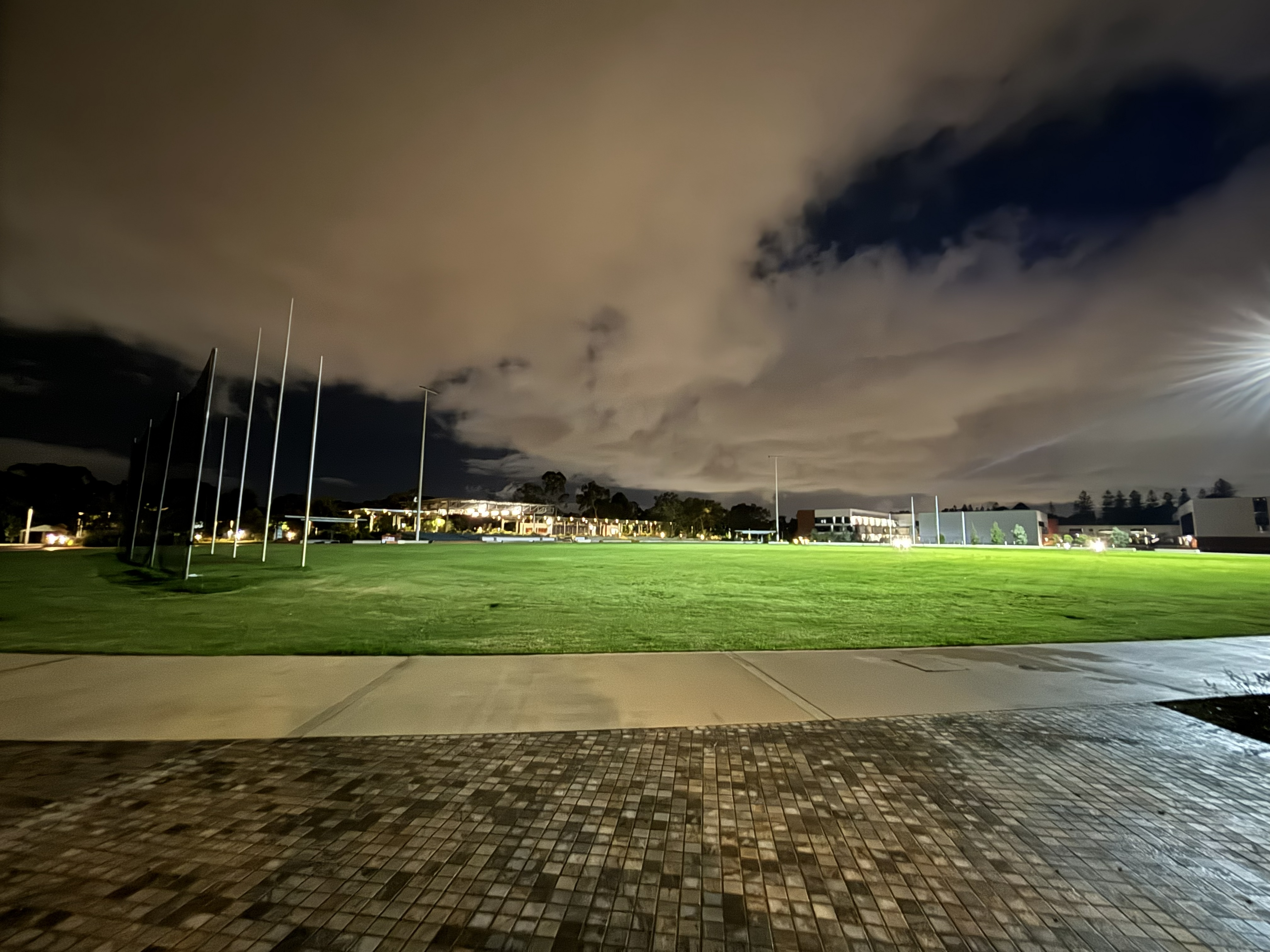
A view of the oval in March 2026.

The playing surface of Subiaco Oval was retained and integrated as part of Bob Hawke College. Students of the college were granted use of the oval in May 2020, with the general public allowed access in June 2020 outside of school hours.

Along with retaining the playing surface and the historic entrance gates, the oval's original player dugouts and 250 of the original wooden grandstand seats were reinstated, and new Australian Rules-sized goalposts were erected. In addition new floodlights were installed for night events.

== Attendance records ==
=== Top 10 overall attendance records ===
Seven of the ground's ten highest attendances were achieved at West Australian Football League grand finals:

Rank	Attendance	Event	Date
1	65,000	Adele	28 February 2017
2	55,000	U2	18 December 2010
3	52,781	WAFL Grand Final	22 September 1979
4	52,322	WAFL Grand Final	27 September 1975
5	51,385	WAFL Grand Final	27 September 1969
6	50,975	WAFL Grand Final	2 October 1971
7	50,883	WAFL Grand Final	18 September 1982
8	50,517	WAFL Grand Final	3 October 1981
9	48,247	AC/DC	6 March 2010
10	47,760	WAFL Grand Final	17 September 1983

=== Top 10 AFL attendance records ===
No.	Date	Match	Teams	Crowd
1	8 September 1991	Qualifying final	West Coast v. Hawthorn	44,142
2	14 September 2007	Semi final	West Coast v. Collingwood	43,627
3	27 August 2006	Round 21	West Coast v. Fremantle	43,527
4	2 September 2005	Qualifying final	West Coast v. Sydney	43,302
5	21 September 2013	Preliminary final	Fremantle v. Sydney	43,249
6	16 September 2006	Semi final	West Coast v. Western Bulldogs	43,219
7	9 September 2006	Qualifying final	West Coast v. Sydney	43,116
8	5 August 2007	Round 18	West Coast v. Fremantle	43,096
9	26 September 2015	Preliminary final	West Coast v. North Melbourne	43,080
10	27 August 2005	Round 22	West Coast v. Adelaide	43,044

^{Last updated on 26 Sep 2015}

== See also ==
- List of closed stadiums by capacity
