= Satterley =

Australian company

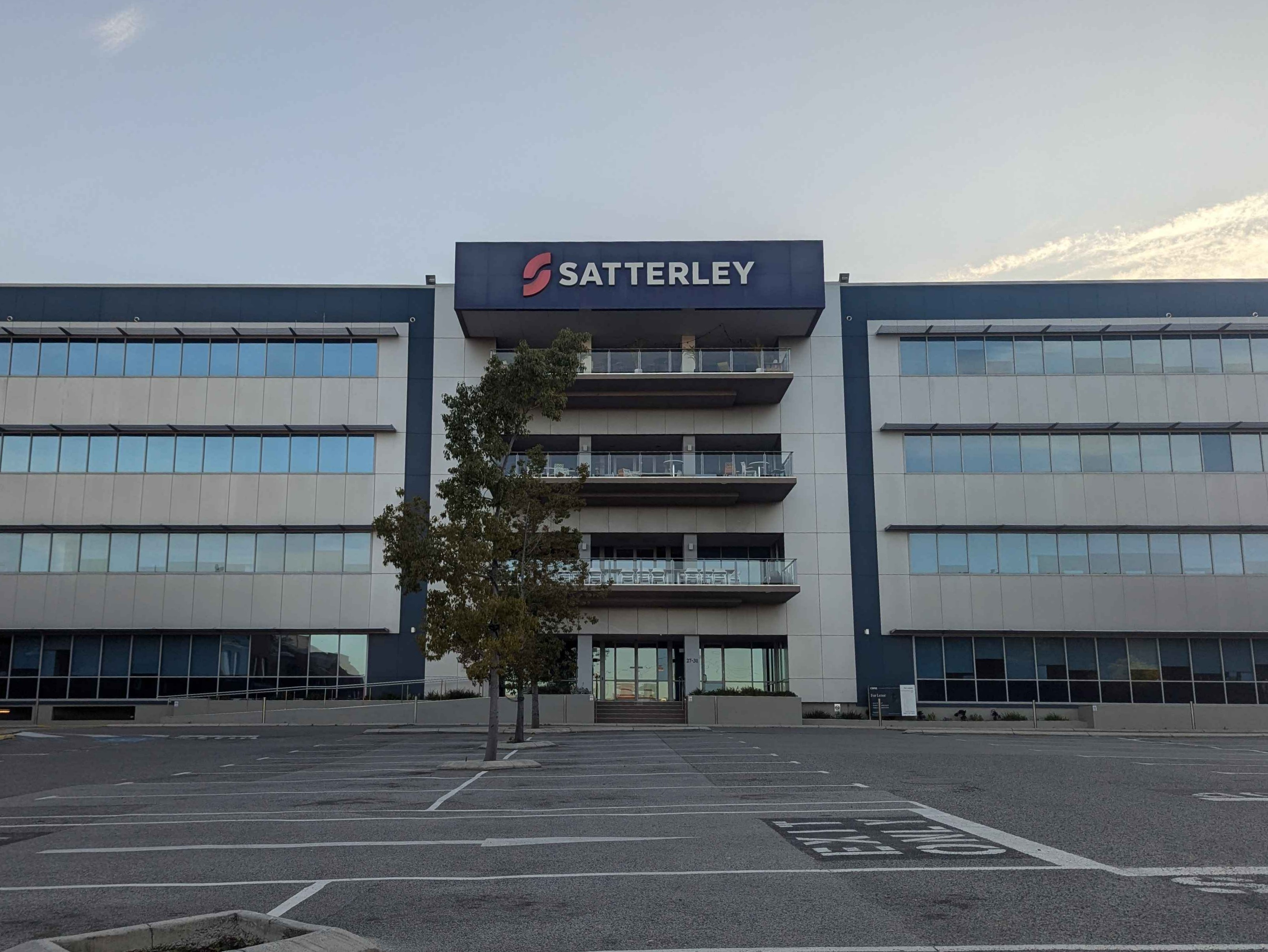
- Satterley headquarters in West Perth
- Industry: Land development
- Founded: 1980
- Founder: Nigel Satterley
- Headquarters: Perth, Western Australia, Australia
- Website: www.satterley.com.au/

Satterley is an Australian privately owned real estate land development company based in Perth. It develops residential estates in Queensland, Victoria and Western Australia.

== History ==
Satterley is based in Perth, Western Australia. The company was founded by Nigel Satterley in 1980. Satterley began his career working for James McCusker, the founder of the Town & Country Bank. This led him to found Statesman Homes, which was sold in 1980, the same year Nigel Satterley founded Satterley Crofts.

During the 1980s, Satterley Crofts became part of an international controversy surrounding land selling expeditions to Singapore. By the 1990s, 70% of private new estate land in Perth was owned by Satterley, with 80 staff and A$350 million in annual sales.

Western Australian hansard records in 1995 mention that Satterley Real Estate controlled the development of the Kwinana Freeway. Hansard records also mention Satterley Real Estate implementing security programs during the Kwinana redevelopment, and involvement in the Dalyellup development.

In November 1997, Shadow Minister for Transport Alannah MacTiernan told parliament about a person who was left homeless and penniless after being misled by Satterley Real Estate. MacTiernan said that despite the complaint being lodged in 1990, and bought directly to the Minister for Fair Trading Peter Foss in 1994, minimal action was taken, and only after receiving attention in the Sunday Times in 1995.

By 1998 Satterley/McCusker was confirmed to be managing at least the suburbs of Balga, Girrawheen, Koondoola, Westminster and Armadale.

Today it is a major land developer in Queensland, Victoria and Western Australia. Satterley's developments include the Perth suburbs of Baldivis, Butler, Clarkson, Hocking. Jindalee, Iluka and Ridgewood.
