= Nigel Satterley =

Australian businessman (born 1947)

- Born: Nigel Frank Satterley; July 7, 1947 (age 79)
- Education: Governor Stirling Senior High School
- Occupation: Property Developer
- Political party: Liberal
- Honours: Member General Division Australia Day Honours (2006)

Nigel Satterley is the founder of Satterley, a privately owned real estate and land development company based in Perth, which develops residential estates in Queensland, Victoria and Western Australia.

== Career ==
Satterley attended Governor Stirling Senior High School but left at the age of 16 to work at a clothing wholesaler in Midland. While working there, he acquired the Western Australian distributorship for Levi Jeans in the late 1960s.

In 1967, Satterley was listed on the National Service Register as a national service registrant excluded by ballot.

During the 1970s, Satterley established a building company called Statesman Homes, based at 135 St Georges Terrace. Around this time, he met James McCusker and Bob McKerrow, who founded the Town & Country Bank.

In 1980, Satterley sold Statesman Homes and founded Satterley Crofts. That same year, he also established Satterley.

By 1993, Satterley owned 70 per cent of Private New Estate Land, employing a total staff of 80 and generating $350 million in annual sales. Clients included the McCusker family, the Town & Country Bank and the Archbishop of Perth.

In 1995, it was reported that Satterley Real Estate was involved in development around the Kwinana Freeway. Hansard records mention the company's implementation of security programs during the Kwinana redevelopment and its involvement in the Dalyellup development.

In November 1997, Shadow Minister for Transport Alannah MacTiernan informed Parliament of a case involving a person left homeless and penniless after allegedly being misled by Satterley Real Estate. MacTiernan stated that although the complaint was lodged in 1990 and brought to the attention of Minister for Fair Trading Peter Foss in 1994, minimal action was taken, and only after the matter was reported by The Sunday Times in 1995.

By 1998, Satterley and McCusker were confirmed to be managing development in at least the suburbs of Balga, Girrawheen, Koondoola, Westminster, and Armadale.

In 2006, Satterley was awarded a Medal in the General Division Australia Day Honour for "service to urban development and renewal programs, to the community through support for charitable and medical research organisations, and to sport." He was the number one ticket holder for the West Coast Eagles in 2007-8.

In 2008, Satterley appeared as a witness before the Select Committee on Housing Affordability in Australia, representing both the Urban Development Institute of Australia (Western Australia) and Satterley. The Institute's president, Warwick Hemsely, described him as a "leader in the industry". During the inquiry, Satterley advocated for tax relief on interest payments for first home buyers and expressed concern over environmental agency delays in development approvals. On the state of the industry, Satterley remarked:

This is what we call the law of the jungle. You are in the jungle and in our jungle you have got rats, weasels, snakes—they are all there. That is the business that Warwick and I are in. It is the development business, and you do have competition.

— Nigel Satterley, 2008 Select Committee on Housing Affordability in Australia, HOUS AFF 65 Tuesday 8 April 2008

He also commended the public development agency LandCorp for being a commercially savvy and high-performing developer.

In 2011, Satterley defended Western Australian Liberal MP Troy Buswell over sexual misconduct allegations, characterising the issue as the actions of a "jilted lover" seeking revenge.

Later that year, Greens Senator Scott Ludlam criticised Satterley in the Environment and Communications Legislation Committee for his support of urban sprawl, negative stance on endangered species protections, and a $25,000 donation to the Liberal Party. Satterley was one of three private developers among thirteen members of the Social Housing Advisory Committee.

In 2017, Satterley publicly criticised the religious faction within the Western Australian Liberal Party, claiming the so-called "clan" remained influential. As a result, he reportedly faced possible expulsion from the party for his comments.

In August 2022, Satterley hosted a dinner at his Peppermint Grove mansion, attended by Premier Mark McGowan, who stated the event aimed to promote investment in Western Australia. Other attendees included Chris Ellison and Michael Chaney.
