= Esanda =

- Industry: Leasing
- Founded: October 1955
- Founder: English, Scottish & Australian Bank
- Defunct: March 2019
- Website: www.esanda.com

Esanda was an Australian finance company. Founded in 1955 by the English, Scottish & Australian Bank, it became a subsidiary of the Australia & New Zealand Banking Group in 1987. The brand was retired in 2019.

== History ==
Esanda was established in October 1955 as the commercial financing division of the English, Scottish & Australian Bank (ES&A). It became a subsidiary of the ANZ Bank after ANZ merged with ES&A in 1970. After ANZ acquired the Bank of Adelaide in 1979 and the National Mutual Royal Bank in 1990, the respective finance divisions were incorporated into Esanda.

In 2016, the dealer finance portfolio was sold to Macquarie Group. In March 2019, ANZ retired the Esanda brand.
