= Waitākere College =

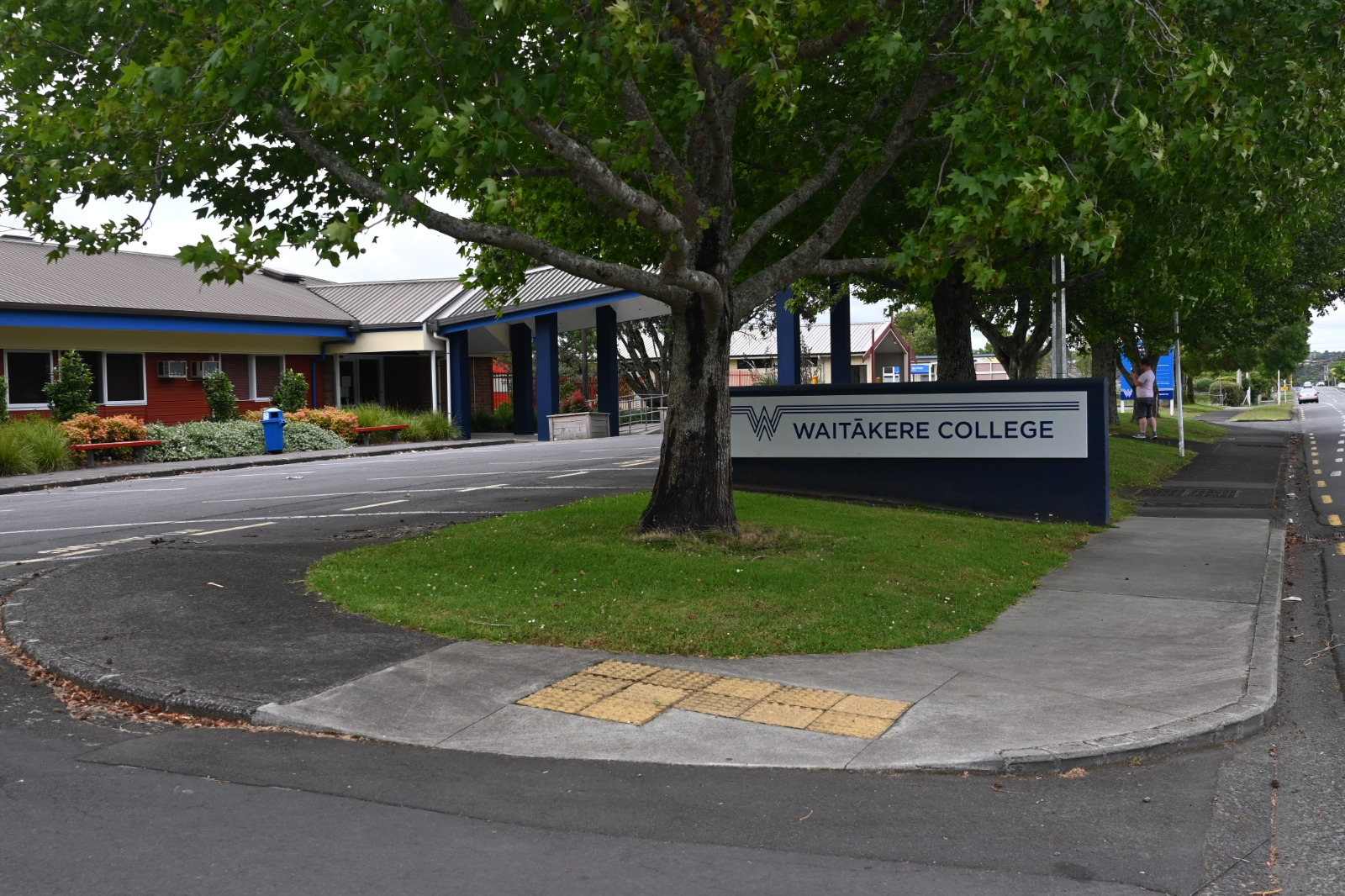

Location
- 42 Rathgar Road, Henderson, Auckland 0610, New Zealand; 36°52′2″S 174°37′15″E

Information
- Type: State, Co-educational, Secondary School (Year 9–13)
- Motto: Achievement for All
- Ministry of Education Institution no.: 44
- Principal: Mark Shanahan
- Enrolment: 1,988 (July 2026)
- Socio-economic decile: 3I
- Website: waitakerecollege.school.nz

Waitākere College is a state coeducational secondary school located in Henderson, Auckland, New Zealand, established in 1975. A total of 1,988 students from Years 9 to 13 (ages 13 to 18) attend Waitākere College as of July 2026.

Students entering the college are allocated into one of three "Houses". The house names use Māori words: Aroha (Love), Manawanui (Perseverance), and Matauranga (Knowledge).

Waitākere College offers an extra 'Performing Arts' subject formerly run by Stephen Nightingale. Entry is based on an audition process and the course runs for years 9 and 10. It covers drama, dance, music, singing, theatre, film/television, editing, theatre lighting, make-up and costume.

Waitākere College is often used as a filming location for the New Zealand soap opera Shortland Street, as the location of Ferndale High School.

== Enrolment ==
As of July 2026, Waitākere College has a roll of 1,988 students, of which 509 (25.6%) identify as Māori.

As of 2026, the school has an Equity Index of 480, placing it amongst schools whose students have above average socioeconomic barriers to achievement (roughly equivalent to deciles 4 and 5 under the former socio-economic decile system).

== Notable alumni ==
- Shayne Elliott (born 1963/64), New Zealand banker, CEO of ANZ Bank.
- Sione Lauaki (1981–2017), All Black
