= Patersons Securities =

Patersons Securities Limited
- Type: Private
- Industry: Financial services, Wealth Management, Corporate Finance
- Founded: 1903
- Headquarters: Perth, Western Australia
- Number of locations: 10 branches
- Area served: Australia
- Key people: Michael Manford (Executive Chairman); Aaron Constantine(Executive Director); Philip Schofield (Executive Director)
- Products: Wealth Management and related services
- Number of employees: ≈250 (2018)
- Website: www.cgf.com

Patersons Securities Ltd was a financial services firm based in Perth, Western Australia, with 10 offices throughout Australia. James Paterson founded the firm in 1903 as an accounting practice, and branched into stock trading in 1922. His 16-year-old son Colin joined the firm in 1929, and by the start of World War II was head of what had been renamed James W. Paterson and Son. Colin Paterson enlisted in the Royal Australian Air Force during World War II, and his sister Mary ran the firm during the war. The firm was forced to exit accounting in 1950, but Colin used his accounting experience to branch out into investment banking. Colin Paterson retired in 1977, and soon afterward the firm incorporated as Paterson Securities. In 1985, it sold a half-interest to Ord Minnett, a subsidiary of JP Morgan Chase, and changed its name to Paterson Ord Minnett. Under this name, it opened offices in outstate Western Australia in the 1990s. It resumed its old name in 2003 and expanded outside Western Australia for the first time, opening an office in Sydney. Within a few years, it opened offices in Canberra and Brisbane as well.

In December 2008, Patersons bought Perth rival Montagu, and a few months later bought Melbourne-based Tolhurst, the oldest stock brokerage in Australia.

Patersons held the naming rights to Subiaco Oval, the Perth area's main sporting facility, between 2011 and 2014 inclusive. The naming rights to the stadium were subsequently taken over by real estate company The Domain Group.

Patersons were acquired by Canaccord Financial Group (Australia) Pty Ltd on the 22nd of October 2019, and are now known as Canaccord Genuity Financial Limited.
