= ANZ Amerika Samoa Bank =

Financial institution

ANZ Guam, Inc.
- Trade name: ANZ Amerika Samoa Bank
- Formerly: Amerika Samoa Bank
- Industry: Financial services
- Founded: 1979
- Defunct: October 2022
- Headquarters: Pago Pago, American Samoa
- Services: Banking
- Owner: ANZ

Amerika Samoa Bank (ASB) was a financial institution established in 1979 in American Samoa and the second-largest bank in the territory with a 44 percent market share. At one point, it had one overseas branch in Honolulu that it opened in 1997 to serve Samoans in Hawaii.

In 1999, Australia and New Zealand Banking Group (ANZ) acquired ASB and renamed it ANZ Amerika Samoa Bank (ANZ ASB). The process was completed by 2001. ANZ ASB had two branches in Samoa and 10 ATMs. In 2007 the bank acquired Citizens Security Bank for $25 million. In 2010, it launched an internet banking service.

On 31 March 2022 ANZ announced it would exit US community banking in Samoa. This resulted in the closure of all bank accounts in October 2022 and loans were transferred to MWW Financial Services LLC. Before closure, the Governor of American Samoa criticised the bank for failing to make loans or invest in the community for a "very long time".

== Sources ==
- Tschoegl, A.E. 2005. Foreign Banks in the Pacific: A Note. Journal of Pacific History.
