= ANZ Fiji =

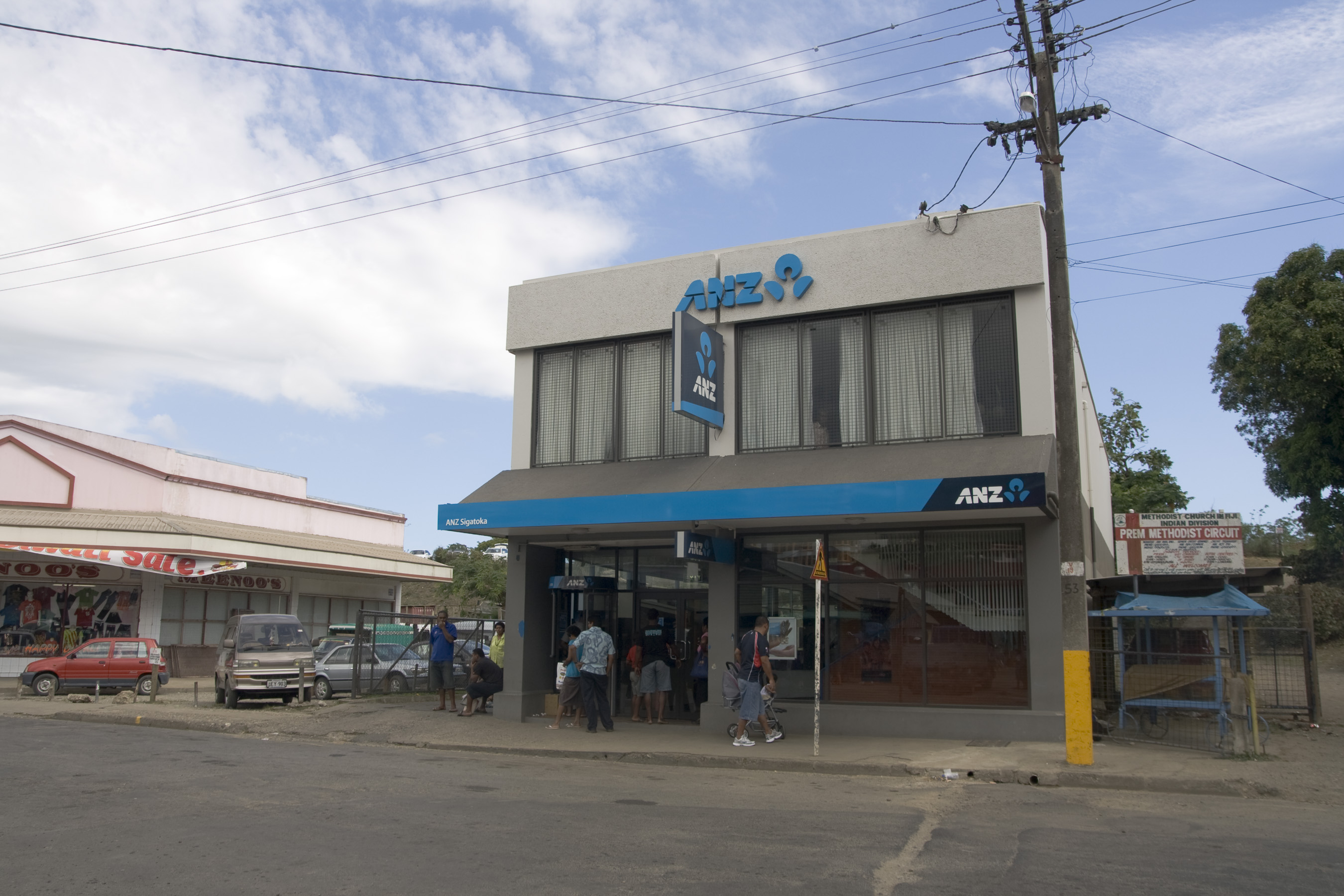
- ANZ bank at Sigatoka, Fiji
- Formerly: Bankoh
- Type: Bank, Subsidiary of ANZ Group
- Industry: Financial services
- Predecessor: ANZ ASB
- Founded: 16 December 1880
- Headquarters: Fiji
- Area served: Fiji
- Key people: Saud Minam CEO of ANZ Fiji
- Products: Business Banking and Retail Banking, Markets/International Trade Services, Risk, Credit, Operations and Human Resources
- Brands: ANZ
- Services: Banking
- Parent: ANZ Group

ANZ Fiji is the largest bank in Fiji and has about a 40% market share. ANZ Fiji currently operates 13 branches country-wide.

== History ==
ANZ Fiji traces its presence in Fiji back to 1873 through an acquisition. Investors from Auckland established the Fiji Banking and Commercial Trading Company Limited in 1873. However, the bank's owners sold it in 1876 to the Bank of New Zealand (BNZ); ANZ Group acquired BNZ’s operations in 1990 after 114 years of Bank of New Zealand ownership.

ANZ’s own entry into the Pacific region dates back to 16 December 1880 when the Union Bank of Australia (est.1837) opened a branch in the old capital of Fiji, Levuka. However, the bank closed the branch in 1895. In 1951, Union Bank’s successor, ANZ, returned to Fiji with a representative office that it upgraded to a branch.

In 1985, ANZ acquired Barclays Bank’s operations, which Barclays had established in 1973. In 2001, ANZ bought Bank of Hawaii’s Bankoh subsidiary, which had three branches throughout Fiji. Bankoh had entered the Fijian banking market in 1993.

In February 2017, ANZ Fiji appointed Saud Abdul Minam as CEO of ANZ Fiji. Previously, Saud Abdul Minam served as Head of Commercial, Pacific at Australia & New Zealand Banking Group Limited. During his tenure as Head of Commercial, ANZ has announced free access to its internet banking platform and website for Vodafone Fiji users.

In December 2021, ANZ Fiji appointed Viniana Uluiviti as Chief Operating Officer. Uluiviti had previously held several senior positions within ANZ, including Head of Transaction Banking Operations and International Payments Manager.

In late December 2024 and early January 2025, ANZ Fiji experienced a three-day payment system outage that disrupted customer transactions. The issue began on 30 December and was resolved on 2 January 2025, after which normal payment processing resumed. The bank stated that the disruption was caused by a complex technical issue and acknowledged the impact on customers.

In February 2026, ANZ announced the appointment of Sohaib Mahmood as Country Head for Fiji, subject to regulatory approval. Mahmood assumed the role alongside his existing position as Head of Commercial Banking, Pacific, and has lived and worked in the region since 2013. At the same time, ANZ announced that outgoing Country Head Rabih Yazbek would transition to a new role as Head of Client Coverage for the United Kingdom and Europe.

== Sources ==
- Butlin, S. J. 1961. Australia and New Zealand Bank: The Bank of Australasia and the Union Bank of Australia Limited, 1828-1951. London: Longmans, p. 207.
- Chappell, N.M. 1961. New Zealand Banker’s Hundred: A History of the Bank of New Zealand, 1861-1961. Wellington: Bank of New Zealand.
- Narube, S. and B.T. Whiteside. 1985. "Financial Institutions and Markets in Fiji". In M. T. Skully, ed. Financial Institutions and Markets in the Southwest Pacific. London: Macmillan Press.
