= English, Scottish & Australian Bank =

Australian bank (1852–1970)

English, Scottish & Australian Bank Limited
- Seal of the ES&A Bank. The motto translates from Latin as "By the gift of god".
- Type: Public
- Industry: Banking
- Founded: 1852
- Fate: Merged, 1 October 1970
- Successor: Australia and New Zealand Banking Group Limited

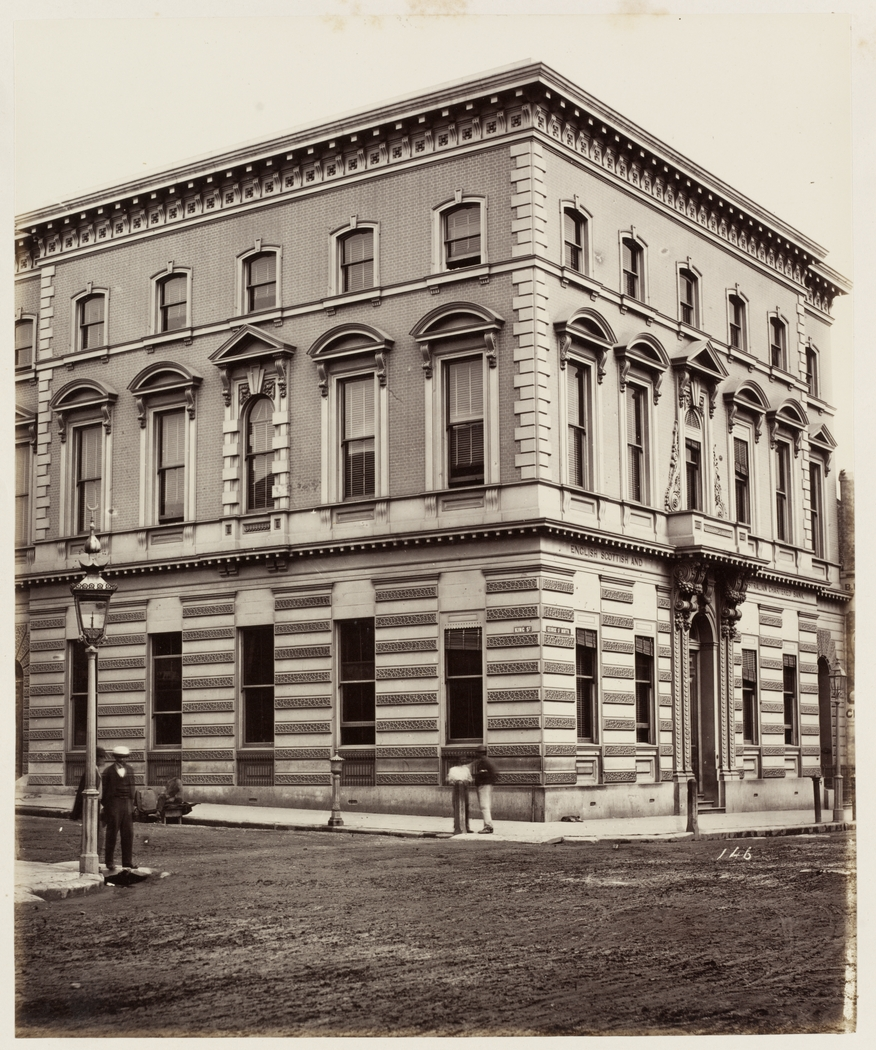
Sydney branch of the English, Scottish and Australian Bank, 1872. (State Library of New South Wales).

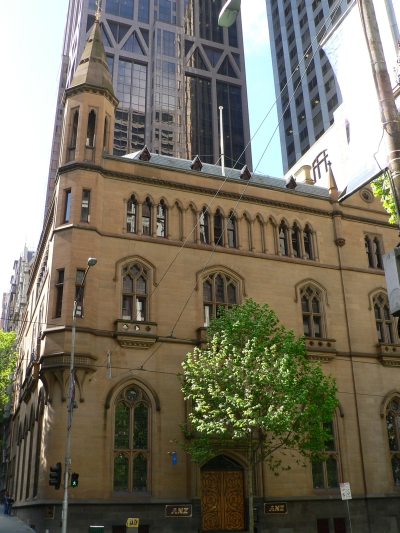
Former Melbourne branch corner of Queen Street and Collins Street, Built in 1883.

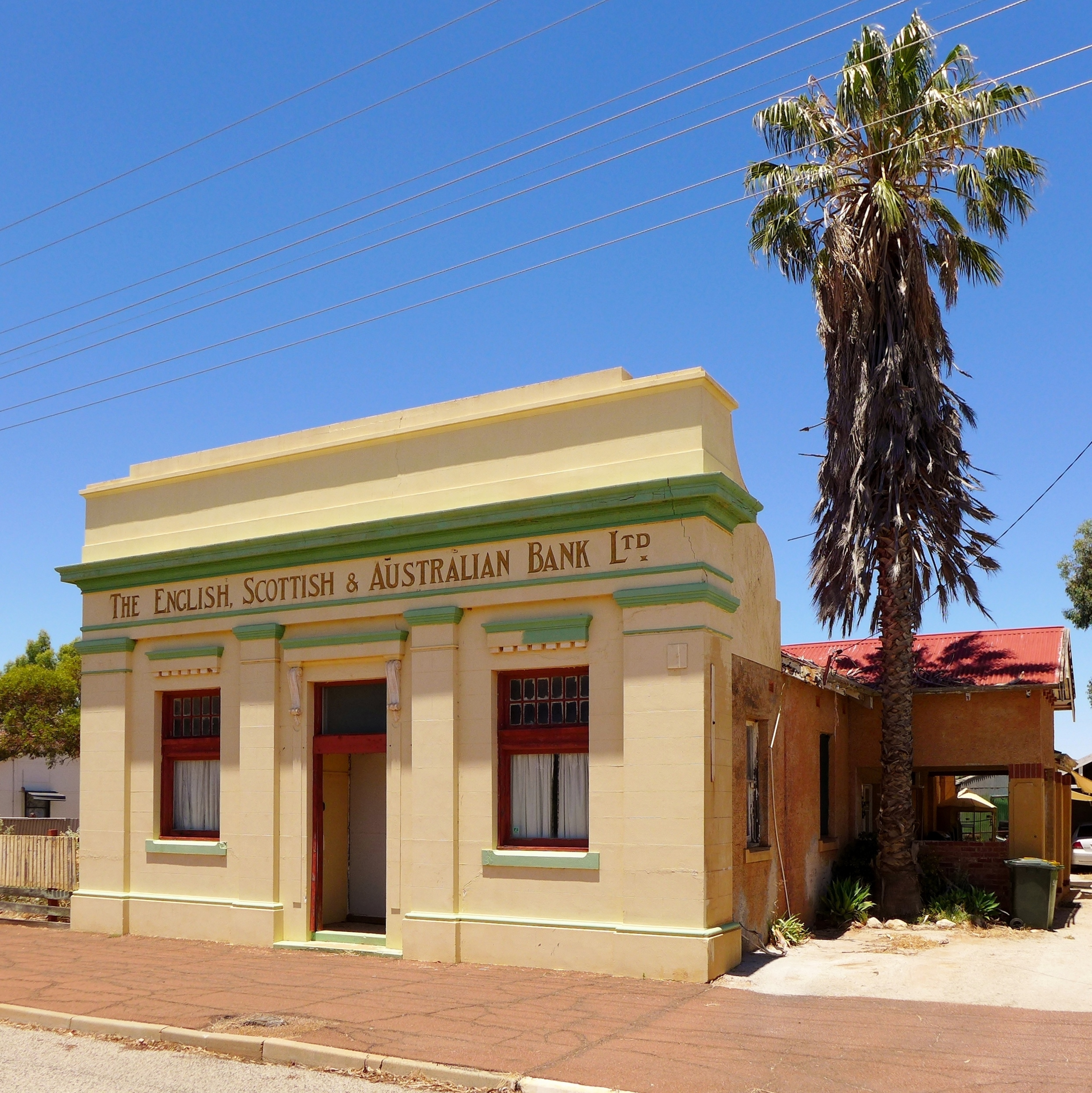
The former English, Scottish & Australian Bank building in Trayning, Western Australia in 2014

The English, Scottish & Australian Bank Limited was an Australian bank founded in 1852 by royal charter in London and named English, Scottish and Australian Chartered Bank. Following a financial reconstruction in 1893 its business was renamed English, Scottish and Australian Bank Limited.

Known as ES&A it merged with ANZ on 1 October 1970 to form Australia and New Zealand Banking Group Limited.

== History ==
ES&A opened its first Australian branch in Sydney in 1853. Australian banknotes were printed by the bank and issued at branches in Sydney, Adelaide, Hobart, and Melbourne. In 1893 its business was renamed the English, Scottish & Australian Bank Limited following a financial upheaval.

It was one of 16 banks which supplied blank note forms to the Australian Government in 1911, which were superscribed as redeemable in gold and issued as the first Commonwealth notes.

The Commercial Bank of Tasmania and the London Bank of Australia were taken over in 1921 and the Royal Bank of Australia in 1927.

Prominent South Australian architect F. Kenneth Milne designed several buildings for the bank before 1929.

On 1 October 1970 ES&A merged with the Australia and New Zealand Bank to form the Australia and New Zealand Banking Group Limited. At the time of the merger ES&A had a network of about 570 branches across Australia.

=== Esanda ===
Esanda was a consumer finance division of ES&A which began separate operations in 1955. Its name is an acronym of ES&A. In 2015 ANZ sold Esanda to Macquarie Group.

== Executive leadership ==
=== Chairmen ===
#	Name	Term start	Term end	Ref
	Alexander Lang Elder	1867	5 September 1885	
	Paterson Ward	13 October 1885	1886	
	Frederick Hankey	1886	9 April 1889	
	Sir James McCulloch	9 April 1889	23 July 1890	
	Charles John Hegan	July 1890	2 December 1920	
	Andrew Williamson	2 December 1920	25 October 1937	
	Sidney Marr Ward	19 November 1937	2 September 1946	
	Sir Frederick Young	2 September 1946	26 August 1948	
	Viscount Hampden	29 September 1948	16 January 1969	

== Notable staff ==
Charles Wren became the accountant and branch inspector for South Australia in 1881. He moved to Melbourne in 1888 as inspector's accountant. He was appointed resident inspector in New South Wales in 1901, and became the bank's Australasian general manager in July 1909.
