= Charles William Wren =

Australian banker

- Born: 15 November 1856; North Adelaide
- Died: 19 April 1934 (aged 77); Italy

Charles William Wren (15 November 1856 – 19 April 1934) was an Australian banker. Wren was born in North Adelaide, South Australia and died in Italy.

Wren became the accountant and branch inspector for the English, Scottish and Australian Bank for South Australia in 1881. He moved to Melbourne in 1888 as inspector's accountant. He was appointed resident inspector in New South Wales in 1901, and became the bank's Australasian general manager in July 1909.

== See also ==
- Andrew Fisher
- Sir Denison Samuel King Miller
