= Shayne Elliott =

New Zealand banker

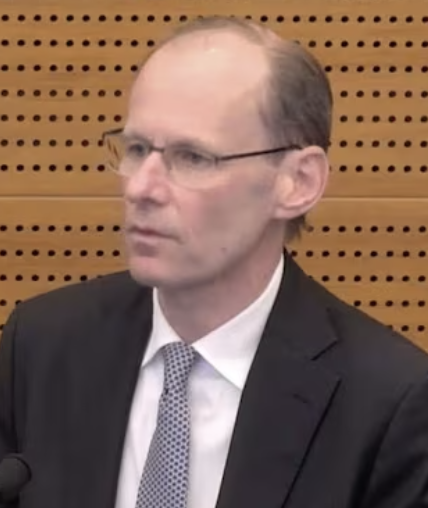
- Elliott in 2018
- Born: Shayne Cary Elliott; 1963 or 1964 (age 62–63); New Zealand
- Education: Waitakere College; University of Auckland
- Occupation: Banker
- Title: CEO, ANZ Bank
- Spouse: Najla Elliott

Shayne Cary Elliott (born 1963) is a New Zealand banker, and a former chief executive officer (CEO) of ANZ Bank.

== Career ==
Prior to joining ANZ Bank, Shayne Elliott was a senior executive at EFG Hermes, and worked for Citibank. He joined ANZ Bank in June 2009 as the head of the bank's institutional division. In 2012, Elliott became CFO of ANZ. In September 2015, it was announced that Elliott would be replacing Mike Smith as ANZ's CEO starting January 1, 2016. On May 11, 2025 Elliott stepped down as CEO.

As CEO of ANZ, Elliott was praised for his 'purpose' driven leadership, which has seen the bank support the LGBTQI community and refugees in Australia.

== Personal life ==
Shayne Elliott is the son of a builder, and grew up in Te Atatū South, a suburb of Auckland. He was educated at Waitakere College and the University of Auckland.

Elliott is married to Najla, an Egyptian-born economist, who he met when he was running Citigroup's Egypt business in Cairo.

Business positions
Preceded by Mike Smith	Chief Executive Officer of ANZ Banking Group; 2016 – present	Incumbent
