= James McCusker (banker) =

Australian banker (1913–1995)

Sir James McCusker
- Born: James Alexander McCusker; December 2, 1913; North Perth, Western Australia, Australia
- Died: September 30, 1995 (aged 81)
- Alma mater: Perth Modern School
- Spouse: Mary Martindale Whyle 1935 (m. 1995)
- Children: 3 (including Malcolm McCusker)
- Military career
- Branch: AIF
- Rank: Sergeant
- Unit: 1st Armoured Division
- Known for: Founder of the Town & Country Building Society
- Conflicts: World War II
- Awards: Knight Bachelor (1983)

Sir James Alexander McCusker (2 December 1913 – 30 September 1995) was a prominent Australian financial services industry figure and philanthropist during the 20th century.

== Early life ==
McCusker was born in North Perth, Western Australia, and educated at Highgate Primary School in the Perth suburb of Highgate before winning a scholarship to Perth Modern School, which he attended until aged 14 when, due to his parents' financial circumstances, he left to join the Commonwealth Bank as a junior clerk.

When World War II broke out, he joined the AIF, and became a sergeant with the 1st Armoured Division. When the war ended, he re-joined the bank and was transferred to its Hobart branch as valuer and accountant, in 1948. He returned to Western Australia in 1953, when he became a senior manager of the William Street branch of the bank in Perth.

== Building society movement ==
In 1959, he left the bank to establish and manage several terminating building societies, which provided finance to enable people to buy a home. Prominent among these was the Town & Country Building Society (T&CBS), founded by him and his son Malcolm and friend Bob McKerrow, in 1964 with capital of £100,000, the first permanent building society to be established in Western Australia for over 100 years.

With others, he bought a large area of farming land to the east of Perth, which they developed into residential lots which were sold as a house and land package, with building society finance provided. This became the Perth suburb of Thornlie.

Under McCusker's leadership, the T&CBS prospered. Within five years it had over $100 million in assets, increasing to over $900 million by 1990, making it then one of WA's largest financial institutions, with 31 branches, 103 agencies and 650 staff. It developed and marketed residential land projects in metropolitan Perth, as well as providing finance, both in rural and metropolitan areas, to assist home buyers, new businesses and agriculture.

During a high interest period in the 1980s, he oversaw the establishment of a scheme to enable home buyers with little or no equity to rent a home of their choice, with an option to buy.

McCusker was elected President of the WA Association of Permanent Building Societies in 1978; he stepped down in 1979 but remained a councillor. He was a member of the WA Indicative Planning Committee on Housing, and in 1980 chaired the state's committee of inquiry into rates and taxes. He was knighted in the 1983 New Year Honours for services to banking in WA.

In 1990, T&CBS was purchased by the ANZ Bank for $145 million, with the McCusker family, holding 54% of shares, one of the major beneficiaries. McCusker was appointed chairman of the ANZ Bank's WA Advisory Board.

== Philanthropy ==
In the following years, the family company Martindale Pty Ltd, of which James and his son Malcolm were co-directors, engaged in a range of philanthropic projects.

The Sir James McCusker Training Foundation was established in 1990, providing support and training for carers of Alzheimer's disease sufferers, via the McCusker Foundation for Alzheimer's Research and facilities for the accommodation and care of sufferers (Lady McCusker Home).

Martindale was also a major financial supporter of the Lions Eye Institute, Glaucoma Research Institute, the WA Urological Research Centre, the WA Institute of Medical Research, the Cerebral Palsy Foundation, the Country Medical Foundation, Workskill Australia Foundation (WA Division), Paraplegic Association of WA and Birthright (WA branch).

Apart from its philanthropic activities, Martindale engaged in land development, agriculture and grazing. Its major land developments were the establishment of new Perth subdivisions: Beaumaris (in Iluka, where there is a public park, the "Sir James McCusker Park"), Secret Harbour, and The Avenues, Cannington. It acquired and operated a sheep station, Boolardy on the Murchison River, and Landor, a cattle station on the Gascoyne River. It also had agricultural interests (cereal crops, cattle and sheep) in the Dandaragan, Calingiri and Victoria Plains districts, totally approximately 10,000 hectares. McCusker, who took a keen interest in farming, was made a life member of the Royal Agricultural Society.

With a view to "putting something back" into the agricultural industry, James and Malcolm also established the Martindale Research Project, in conjunction with the University of Western Australia Faculty of Agricultural Science and the Department of Agriculture and Food. It was the largest agricultural research project of its nature in Australia. Martindale was a state winner of the Landcare Awards for its work in restoring and rendering productive badly degraded sandplain lands. The methods and results of the research project were made freely available to the public, through field days and publications.

== Family life ==
In 1935 he married Mary Martindale Whyle. They had three children, and six grandchildren. McCusker's oldest child Malcolm continued his father's dedication to philanthropy and became Governor of Western Australia. James's wife died in early 1995, and he died on 30 September in the same year.
