= Commercial Bank of Tasmania =

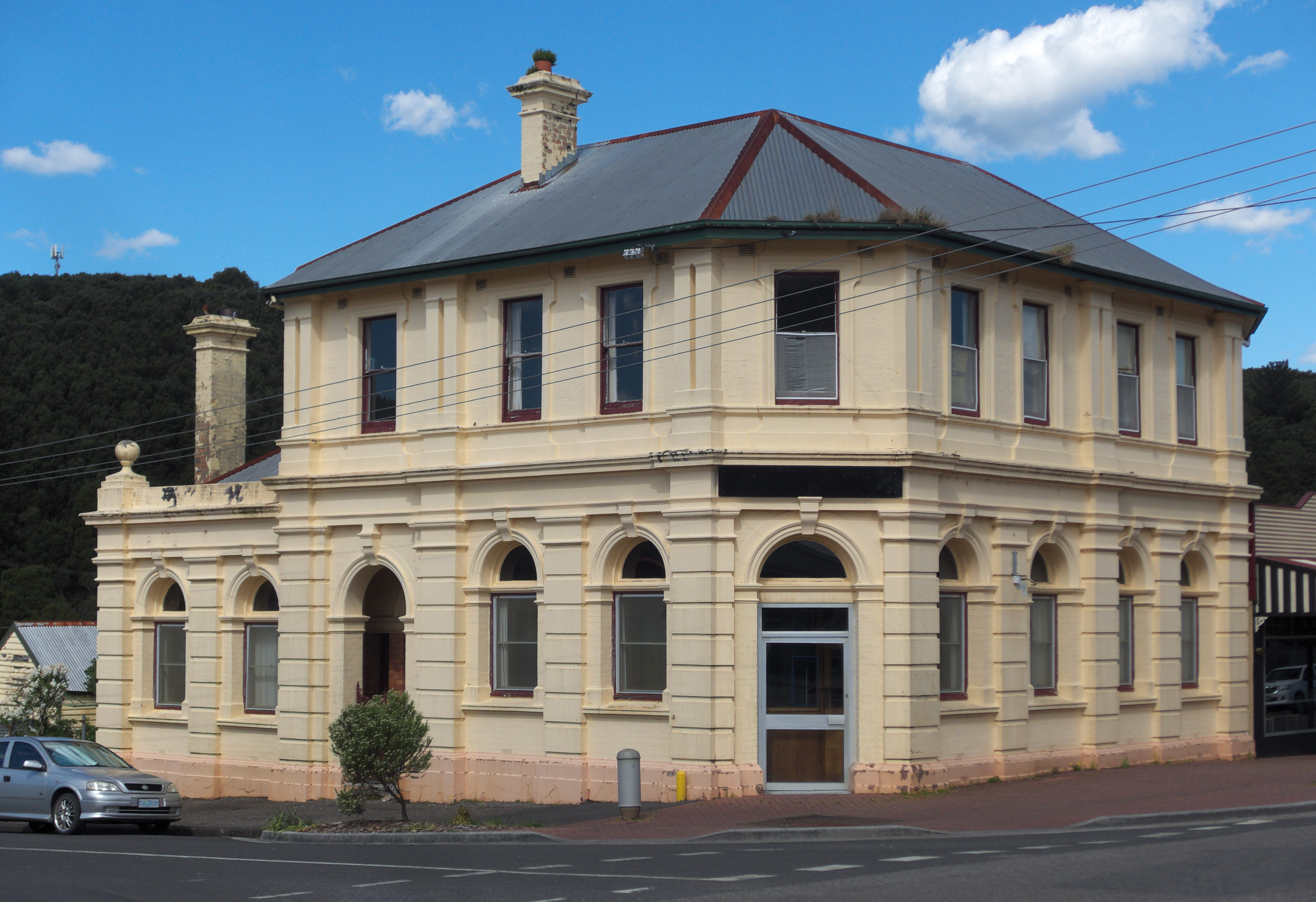
Zeehan branch opened 1899

The Commercial Bank of Tasmania, the second oldest bank in Australia, was established in 1832 with its head office in Macquarie Street, Hobart. A branch was opened in Launceston in August 1838.

The early records that survive are only the original deed of settlement of 1832 and records of a special meeting in 1839. The shareholders appear to have regarded their business as a private matter.

It was sold with its 18 branch offices to the English, Scottish & Australian Bank in April 1921.
