= Alzheimer's research in Australia =

Alzheimer's research in Australia is carried out at a number of institutions and supported by various charities.

== Dementia Australia Research Foundation ==
This is the research arm of the advocacy organization, Dementia Australia. It funds Australia's new and early career dementia researchers. Recently, 85% of their funding goes to their grants program, which in 2013 provided more than $2.5 million of competitive research funding.

== McCusker Alzheimer's Research Foundation ==
The McCusker Alzheimer's Research Foundation Inc was established in 2001 to support the research of Professor Ralph Martins, Foundation Chair in Aging and Alzheimer's Disease at Edith Cowan University. Its patron is Malcolm McCusker and vice-patron is Terrie Delroy.

The foundation is currently researching and testing on various possible cures of the Alzheimer's. Tests are being conducted on diabetes drugs, turmeric (Curcumin), testosterone and omega 3 (being tested to prevent the beta amyloid).

== University of Queensland ==
Researchers at the University of Queensland have developed an ultrasound technique that has been shown to work in mice and hope to trial it in humans. The ultrasound waves activate microglial cells that digest and remove the amyloid plaques.
