= National Mutual Royal Bank =

Former Australian bank

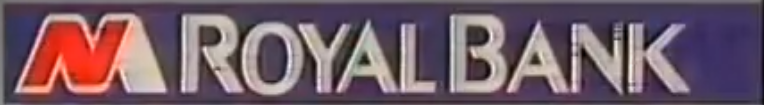
- Industry: Banking
- Predecessor: National Mutual Permanent Building Society
- Founded: 27 February 1986
- Defunct: March 1990
- Headquarters: Australia
- Parent: National Mutual (50%); Royal Bank of Canada (50%)

The National Mutual Royal Bank (NMRB) was an Australian bank. Founded in February 1986 by National Mutual and the Royal Bank of Canada, it opened with 45 former National Mutual Permanent Building Society branches. In 1986 it took over the United Permanent Building Society. After only four years in existence, it was sold in March 1990 to the ANZ Bank.
