= ANZ (bank) =

Australian multinational bank

Australia and New Zealand Banking Group Limited
- ANZ's logo used since October 2009

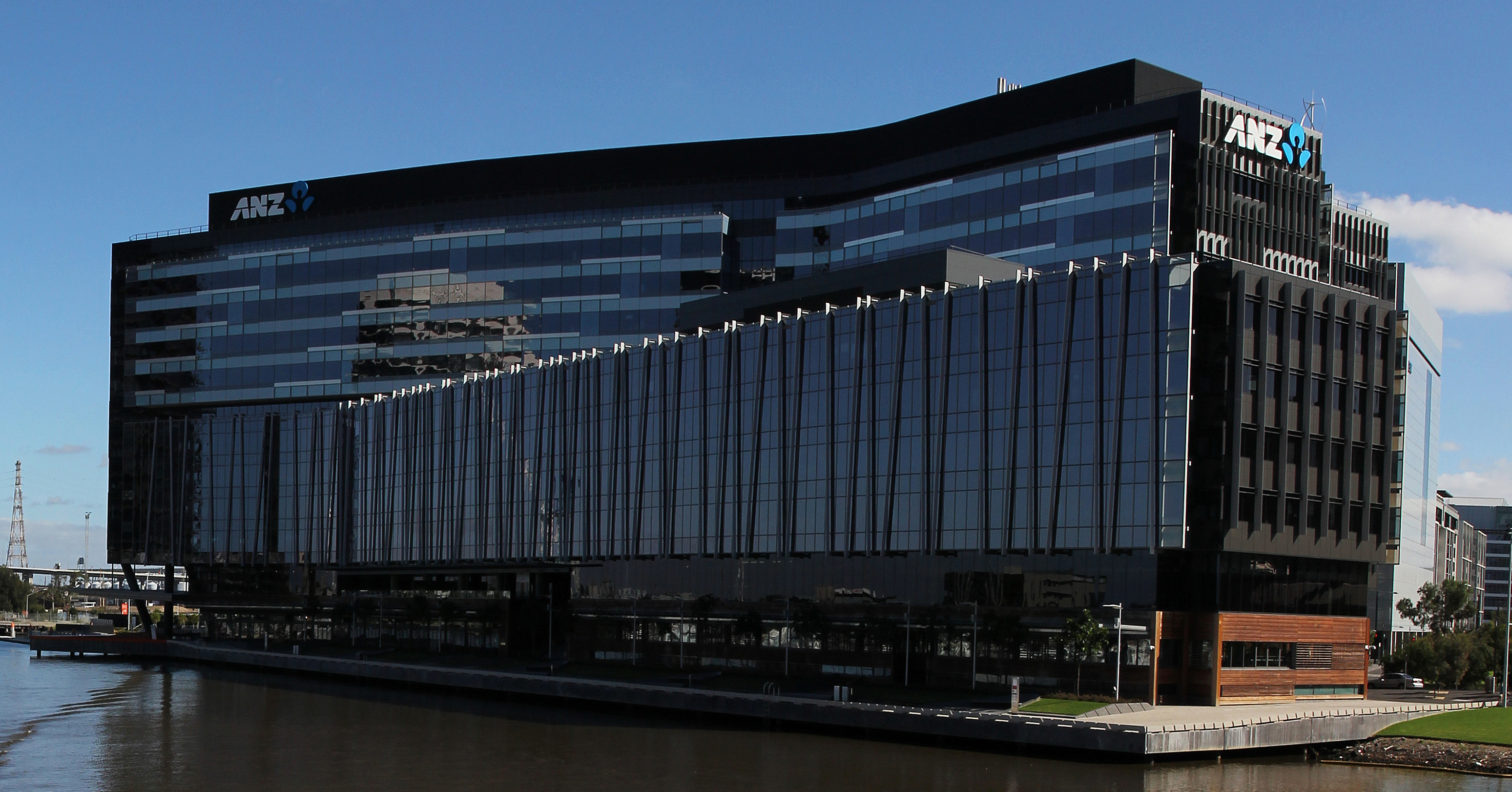
- Headquarters at 833 Collins Street in Melbourne
- Type: Public
- Traded as: ASX: ANZ; NZX: ANZ; S&P/ASX 200 component; S&P/NZX 50 component
- Industry: Financial services
- Predecessor: Bank of Australasia; Union Bank of Australia; ES&A Bank
- Founded: 14 December 1835; 190 years ago (Bank of Australasia); 2 October 1951; 75 years ago (ANZ Bank); 16 January 1969; 57 years ago (ANZ Group); 1 October 1970; 56 years ago (ANZ Group Merger)
- Headquarters: 833 Collins Street, Melbourne, Victoria, Australia
- Area served: Worldwide
- Key people: Paul O'Sullivan (Chairman); Nuno Matos (CEO)
- Products: Asset management; Banking; Commodities; Credit cards; Equities trading; Insurance; Investment management; Mortgage loans; Private equity; Wealth management
- Operating income: ▲ A$22.19 billion (2025)
- Net income: ▼ A$5.89 billion (2025)
- Total assets: ▲ A$1.29 trillion (2025)
- Total equity: ▲ A$71.90 billion (2025)
- Number of employees: 42,698 (2025)
- Subsidiaries: ANZ Bank New Zealand; Suncorp Bank
- Website: www.anz.com.au

The Australia and New Zealand Banking Group Limited, commonly known as ANZ Bank, is a multinational banking and financial services company headquartered in Melbourne, Victoria, Australia. It is Australia's second-largest bank by assets and fourth-largest bank by market capitalisation.

ANZ's foundation started with the opening of the Bank of Australasia in 1835, with its first branch opened in Sydney. In 1951, The Australia and New Zealand Bank was established as a merger of the Bank of Australasia and the Union Bank of Australia, which itself was established in 1837. ANZ's current corporate entity was established on 1 October 1970, when the Australia and New Zealand Bank (ANZ) merged with the English, Scottish & Australian Bank (ES&A). It was the largest bank merger in Australian history at the time.. ANZ is one of the Big Four Australian banks, along with the Commonwealth Bank, National Australia Bank and Westpac.

Australian operations make up the largest part of ANZ's business, with commercial and retail banking dominating. ANZ is also the largest bank in New Zealand, where the legal entity became known as ANZ National Bank in 2003 and changed to ANZ Bank New Zealand in 2012. From 2003 to 2012, it operated two brands in New Zealand, ANZ and the National Bank of New Zealand. The National Bank brand was retired in 2012, with a number of branches closing and others converting to ANZ branches. In addition to operations throughout Australia and New Zealand, ANZ also operates in 34 other countries.

ANZ together with its subsidiaries has a workforce of around 42,000 employees and serves more than 11 million customers worldwide.

== History ==
=== 19th century ===
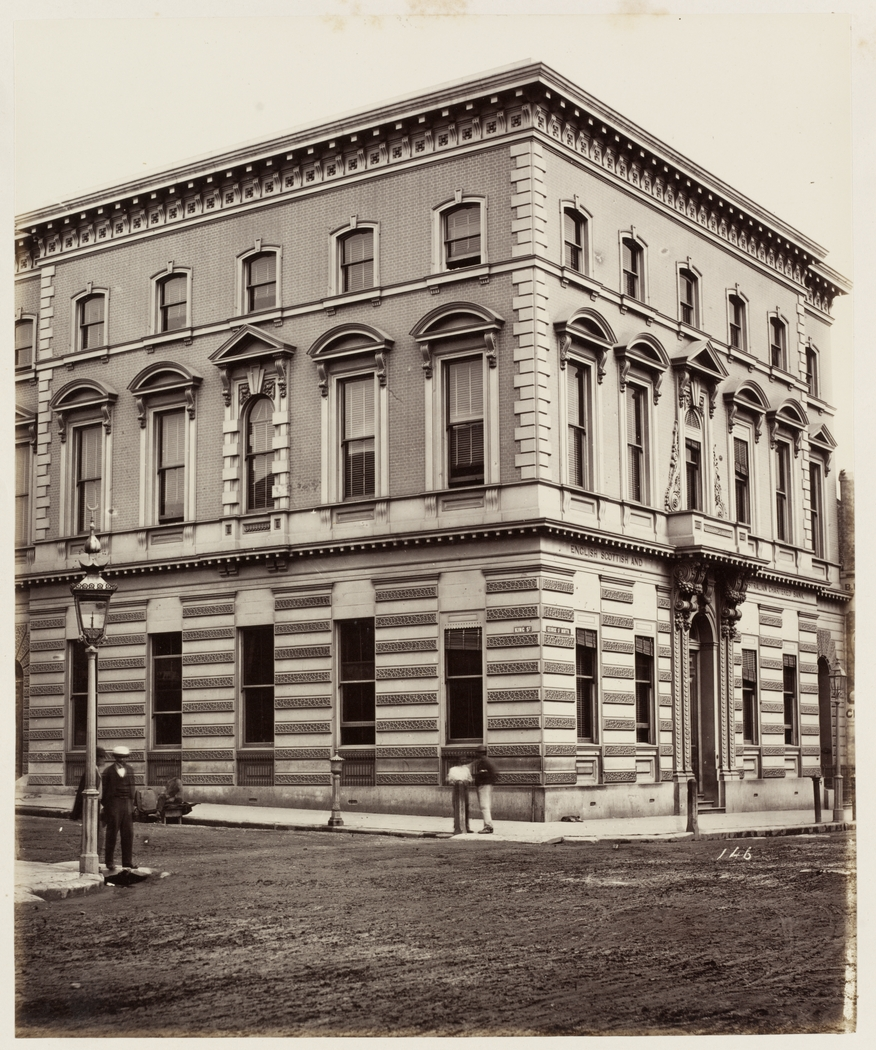
ES&A Bank branch in Sydney, New South Wales in 1872

The Bank of Australasia was founded in London in 1835. Its first branch was opened in Sydney on 14 December 1835. It combined with the Cornwall Bank, which was formed in Launceston, Van Diemens Land in 1828. In 1837, Union Bank of Australia was established in London by a group of people including banker George Fife Angas. The English, Scottish & Australian Bank (ES&A) was established in London in 1852, and opened its first Australian branch in Sydney in 1853. The ES&A bank took over the Commercial Bank of Tasmania and the London Bank of Australia in 1921 and the Royal Bank of Australia in 1927.

=== 20th century ===
In 1951, the Bank of Australasia merged with Union Bank of Australia to form the Australia and New Zealand Bank (ANZ Bank). In 1963, the first computer systems established in new data processing centre in Melbourne. In 1966, ANZ began operations in Honiara, Solomon Islands. In 1968, ANZ opened an office in New York, US. In 1969, ANZ established a representative office in Tokyo, Japan.

On 1 October 1970, ANZ merged with the English, Scottish & Australian Bank to form the present organisation, Australia & New Zealand Banking Group. That same year, the bank began operating in Vanuatu. In 1976, ANZ (PNG) was established. In 1977, ANZ transferred its incorporation from the UK to Australia. In 1979, ANZ acquired the Bank of Adelaide.

In 1980, the Singapore and New York representative offices upgraded to branch status. In 1984, ANZ purchased Grindlays Bank. In 1985, ANZ acquired Barclays' operations in Fiji and Vanuatu. That same year, the bank received a full commercial banking licence and opened a branch in Frankfurt, Germany, and announced ANZ Singapore. In 1988, ANZ opened branches in Rarotonga, Cook Islands and Paris, France. In 1989, ANZ purchased PostBank from New Zealand Government.

During the 1990s, the Australia and New Zealand Banking Group acquired several banks. In 1990, this included National Mutual Royal Bank in March and the Town & Country Building Society in Western Australia in July. That same year, ANZ purchased Lloyd Bank's operations in Papua New Guinea and the Bank of New Zealand's operations in Fiji.

In 1993, ANZ established new headquarters in Melbourne, Australia. They also opened new branches in Hanoi, Vietnam, and Shanghai, China, and began a joint venture with PT Panin Bank in Indonesia. That year they also began operating in Tonga and sold their Canadian operations acquired via the purchase of Grindlays Bank in 1984 to HSBC Bank Canada.

Throughout the late 1990s, ANZ opened new branches in several locations, including Manila, Philippines, and Ho Chi Minh City, Vietnam. In 1997, John McFarlane was appointed chief executive officer and the bank opened its Beijing branch. In 1999, ANZ formed a strategic alliance with E*Trade Australia for online share trading and purchased Amerika Samoa Bank.

=== 21st century ===
In 2000, ANZ sold its Grindlays businesses in the Middle East and South Asia, and associated Grindlays Private Banking business to Standard Chartered. In 2001, ANZ opened branches in Timor Leste and began offering credit card services in Hong Kong. In 2002, ANZ formed a joint venture with ING Group for wealth management and life insurance business in Australia and New Zealand. The next year, ANZ acquired the National Bank of New Zealand.

In 2005, ANZ established the ANZ Royal Bank in Cambodia, a joint venture with the Cambodian-based Royal Group company. In 2006, ANZ announced a new world headquarters in the Melbourne Docklands and invested in the Bank of Tianjin, China. In 2007, ANZ acquired E*Trade Australia and Citizen Securities Bank in Guam. Also in 2007, Mike Smith, formerly of HSBC, became CEO after the retirement of John McFarlane in October and the company took over the naming rights sponsorship for Sydney's Stadium Australia.

In August 2009, ANZ purchased the Royal Bank of Scotland's (RBS) operations in six Asian countries for $550 million. In September the company announced it would buy out ING Group's 51% stake of the joint venture, giving ANZ 100% control of ING Australia. In November, ANZ opened their new headquarters in Melbourne.

In 2010, ANZ acquired the RBS' interests in Hong Kong, Taiwan, Singapore and Indonesia. That year ANZ also expanded its stake in the Bank of Tianjin. In November, ING Australia was renamed OnePath.

In 2012, ANZ announced the retirement of the National Bank brand in New Zealand. In 2013, ANZ became the first bank to reopen in the Christchurch CBD following the 2011 earthquakes.

In 2016, Shayne Elliott became CEO. In April ANZ partnered with Apple to bring Apple Pay to its customers. In 2017, ANZ acquired REALas property price predictor start-up.

In 2018, the Royal Commission into Misconduct in the Banking, Superannuation and Financial Services Industry heard that ANZ had failed to accurately verify the living expenses of home loan customers referred to the bank by mortgage brokers, believing that this was the responsibility of the brokers, in spite of a conflict of interest in doing so; and that, due to processing issues, it had charged nearly 500,000 home loan customers the incorrect interest rate for more than ten years, leading the bank to overcharge customers by approximately $90 million.

Bloomberg Intelligence estimated in May 2020 that ANZ's surplus capital was A$3.4 billion (US$2.4 billion), with ANZ CEO Shayne Elliott telling Bloomberg that the bank was "sitting on" the excess while it considered market trends.

In February 2020, the Federal Court of Australia fined ANZ AUD10 million for charging customers fees between 2003 and 2015 that it was not entitled to, equating to profits of around AUD3.1 million. The regulator said around 69,000 customers had been affected. For the year ending September 2020, ANZ posted a yearly profit of A$3.58 billion (US$2.53 billion), a decline of 40% from the A$6 billion in 2019, with the bank attributing the drop to the COVID-19 pandemic and "full year credit impairment charges" of A$2.74 billion as a result.

After tensions between China and Australia resulted in China imposing trade curbs on imports from Australia in October 2020, the CEO of ANZ stated to CNBC that the company was also "looking for opportunities" in other Asian countries beyond China as well. It was reported in March 2021 that ANZ was planning to cut its workforce in China by half, and shift the positions elsewhere. In November 2021, Reuters reported that ANZ was being sued by a law firm in a class action lawsuit for unfair contract terms, after ANZ allegedly charged interest on customer purchases that had been repaid on time. The lawsuit focused on charges levied prior to January 2019, when an Australian law outlawing charging retrospective interest had been implemented. In December 2021, ANZ pled guilty in a case filed by the Australian Securities & Investments Commission to breaching its obligations as a financial services and credit licensee provider, and not fully disbursing benefits to 500,000 customers. An A$25 million penalty was proposed.

ANZ said it was combining its digital division and its Australian retail business in February 2022. In March 2022, ANZ launched a digital bank called ANZ Plus. In April 2022, ANZ was involved in a joint venture with Scentre Group, Westpac, IBM and the Commonwealth Bank named Lygon, a blockchain startup. In July 2022, ANZ agreed to terms with Suncorp to purchase Suncorp Bank for $5 billion. However, the Australian Competition & Consumer Commission (ACCC) blocked the deal in August 2023. On 20 February 2024, the Australian Competition Tribunal overturned the decision by the ACCC, paving the way for ANZ to acquire Suncorp Bank.

In 2023, ANZ announced a strategic investment in Australian property media and technology company View Media Group (VMG).

In March 2025, the Australian government provided ANZ with a A$2 billion loan guarantee for 10 years to ensure the bank's maintenance of its Pacific branch network to counter China's growing regional influence. As part of the agreement, ANZ would also invest A$50 million to support its services and expand digital banking in the Pacific region.

== Executive leadership ==
=== Chief executives ===
In May 2025, Nuno Matos, a former executive at HSBC and Santander, succeeded Shayne Elliott as the Chief Executive Officer of ANZ Bank.

The following individuals have been appointed to serve as chief executive:

==== Australia and New Zealand Bank Limited, 1951–1970 ====
| # | Name | Title | Term start | Term end | Ref |
|---|---|---|---|---|---|
| 1 | Aubrey Roy Liddon Wiltshire CMG DSO MC | General Manager | 2 October 1951 | 30 June 1954 | |
| 1 | W. H. Thomas | General Manager | 2 October 1951 | 31 March 1952 | |
| 2 | Walter Ward Riddington | General Manager | 1 April 1952 | 21 January 1954 | |
| 3 | Hugh Williamson CBE | General Manager | 1 July 1954 | 30 June 1961 | |
| 4 | Sir Roger Darvall CBE | General Manager | 1 July 1961 | 31 August 1967 | |
| 5 | Charles Rennie CBE | General Manager | 1 September 1967 | 1 October 1970 | |

==== Australia and New Zealand Banking Group, since 1970 ====
| # | Name | Title | Term start | Term end | Ref |
|---|---|---|---|---|---|
| 1 | Harry McEwin Scambler CBE | Managing Director | 1 October 1970 | 31 March 1973 | |
| 2 | Charles Rennie CBE | Managing Director | 31 March 1973 | 31 March 1976 | |
| 3 | Mac Brunckhorst AO | Managing Director | 1 April 1976 | 31 October 1980 | |
| 4 | John Milne | Managing Director | 1 November 1980 | 12 November 1984 | |
| 5 | Will Bailey AO | Managing Director | 19 November 1984 | 15 August 1988 | |
| 5 | Will Bailey AO | Chief Executive Officer | 15 August 1988 | 30 September 1992 | |
| 6 | Don Mercer | Chief Executive Officer | 1 October 1992 | 30 September 1997 | |
| 7 | John McFarlane OBE | Chief Executive Officer | 1 October 1997 | 30 September 2007 | |
| 8 | Mike Smith OBE | Chief Executive Officer | 1 October 2007 | 31 December 2015 | |
| 9 | Shayne Elliott | Chief Executive Officer | 1 January 2016 | 11 May 2025 | |
| 10 | Nuno Matos | Chief Executive Officer | 12 May 2025 | Incumbent | |

=== Chairs of the Board ===
The following individuals have been appointed to serve as chairman of the board:

==== Australia and New Zealand Bank Limited, 1951–1969 ====
| # | Name | Term start | Term end | Ref |
|---|---|---|---|---|
| 1 | Sir Geoffrey Gibbs KCMG | 2 October 1951 | 1 October 1967 | |
| 2 | Lord Carrington KCMG MC | 1 October 1967 | 16 January 1969 | |

==== Australia and New Zealand Banking Group, since 1969 ====
| # | Name | Term start | Term end | Ref |
|---|---|---|---|---|
| 1 | Lord Carrington KCMG MC | 16 January 1969 | 22 June 1970 | |
| 2 | Sir Alexander Ross | 22 June 1970 | 21 January 1975 | |
| 3 | Angus Mackinnon DSO MC TD | 21 January 1975 | 30 September 1977 | |
| 4 | Sir Ian McLennan KCMG KBE | 1 October 1977 | 18 January 1982 | |
| 5 | Sir William Vines AC CMG | 18 January 1982 | 23 January 1989 | |
| 6 | Milton Deane Bridgland AO | 23 January 1989 | July 1992 | |
| 7 | John Bernard Gough AO OBE | July 1992 | August 1995 | |
| 8 | Charles Goode AC | August 1995 | 1 March 2010 | |
| 9 | John Morschel | 1 March 2010 | 30 April 2014 | |
| 10 | David Gonski AC | 1 May 2014 | 28 October 2020 | |
| 11 | Paul O'Sullivan | 28 October 2020 | Incumbent | |

== Organisational structure ==
- Australia
  - Retail Products
  - Retail Distribution
  - Commercial Banking
  - Wealth (including ETrade in Australia and OnePath)
- ANZ Bank New Zealand
  - ANZ Bank
  - Bonus Bonds
- Institutional Banking
  - Institutional banking
  - Corporate Finance
  - Working Capital
  - Corporate banking
  - Economics@ANZ
- Asia and Pacific
  - ANZ Amerika Samoa Bank
  - ANZ Fiji
  - ANZ Royal Bank
  - International Partnerships

== Operations ==
=== Personal banking ===
Personal banking is one of the largest divisions within ANZ. It provides financial services including banking and lending products to the general public. ANZ serves around six million customers at its Australian branches.

ANZ was the first bank in Australia to offer Apple Pay to its customers.

=== Institutional banking ===
ANZ is the largest institutional bank in Australia. It provides financial services to institutional and corporate customers in Australia and the Asia-Pacific. As of 2019, ANZ has around 7,000 institutional and corporate customers, with a total lending of A$165 billion.

ANZ is committed to sustainable finance for institutional customers transitioning to a low-carbon economy. As of 2021, ANZ has concluded around A$22 billion worth of sustainable finance transactions. In June 2021, ANZ closed Australia's first sustainability-linked bond (SLB) in the domestic debt market. In August 2021, ANZ launched sustainability-linked derivatives (SLD) in Australia, Hong Kong, Singapore and Japan.

=== Asia-Pacific ===
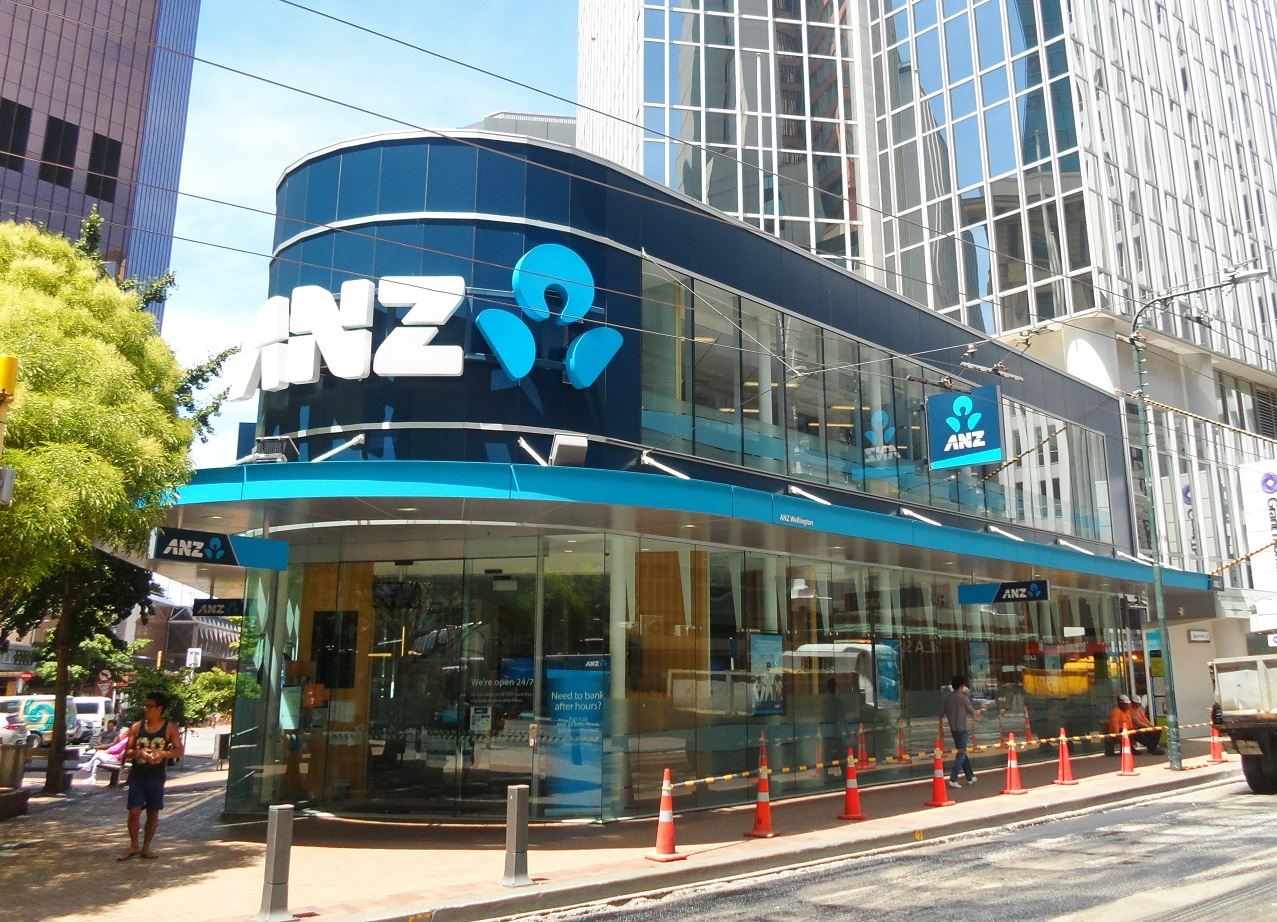
Former ANZ branch in Wellington, New Zealand

ANZ is one of the leading Australian banks in the Asia-Pacific region. It has been aggressive in its expansion into the emerging markets of China, Vietnam and Indonesia. ANZ is also a leading bank in New Zealand as well as several Pacific Island Nations where it competes in many markets with fellow Australian bank Westpac. ANZ's arm in New Zealand is operated through a subsidiary company, ANZ National Bank, from 2003 to 2012, when it changed by ANZ Bank New Zealand upon merging the ANZ and National Bank brands.

In March 2005, it formed a strategic alliance with Vietnam's Sacombank involving an acquisition of 10% of Sacombank's share capital. As part of the strategic alliance, ANZ will provide technical assistance in the areas of risk management and retail and small business banking.

ANZ has followed a similar strategy in China, where it acquired a 20% share in Tianjin City Commercial Bank in July 2006. It also negotiated a similar deal with Shanghai Rural Commercial Bank.

In August 2009, ANZ purchased RBS's retail units in Taiwan, Singapore, Indonesia and Hong Kong, as well as RBS's banking businesses in Taiwan, the Philippines and Vietnam. It was purchased for the price of A$687 million. Because of the acquisition, ANZ became an atm5 member in Singapore.

As of September 2012, the company had a total of 1,337 branches worldwide.

In 2016, ANZ adopted a less aggressive approach to expansion in the Asia-Pacific region after low returns. At the end of October 2016, ANZ announced the sale of its entire Asian retail and wealth management operations (including those of which were previously owned by RBS and ABN AMRO) to DBS Bank; ANZ also signalled a withdrawal from its "Asian pivot".

In 2020, as tensions between the US and China escalated, CEO Shayne Elliot acknowledged that the conflict had “raised the risk profile” of the bank's China investments, and said that the bank could further pull back from the country.

=== Offices ===
In September 2006, plans were unveiled for ANZ's world headquarters to be located in Melbourne's Docklands precinct. The complex features a vast low rise office building, shops, car and bicycle parking facilities. The complex enables 6,500 ANZ staff to work in one integrated area. The building, located at 833 Collins Street, is the largest office complex in Australia at 84,500 square metres (910,000 sq ft) net lettable area, with 130,000 square metres (1,400,000 sq ft) gross floor area, and an accredited Six-Green Star Building. Construction commenced in late 2006 and the building opened in late 2009. Designed by HASSELL and Lend Lease Design, the building faces the Yarra River. In 2006, it was expected that it would cost A$478 million to build the new headquarters, however costed A$750 million by the time it was complete in 2009. The building was one of the winners at the 2010 World Architecture Festival in the category "Interiors and Fit Out of the Year".

In 2016 ANZ announced that it would sell its former Melbourne global headquarters, located at the junction of 100 Queen Street, and 380 Collins Street, Melbourne, called Verdon Chambers and more commonly known as the Gothic Bank. The former bank building was purpose built as the head office of the English, Scottish & Australian Bank (a predecessor of the current ANZ Banking Group). The building was acquired in December 2016 by The GPT Group for A$275.4 million.

The ANZ Bank Centre in Sydney includes ANZ as its major tenant. The office building was designed by Francis-Jones Morehen Thorp and was completed in April 2013.

In 2019 construction was completed on the expansion of the ANZ Docklands precinct at 839 Collins Street; a 20 storey office building adjacent to the existing office complex.

== Marketing ==
=== Advertising ===
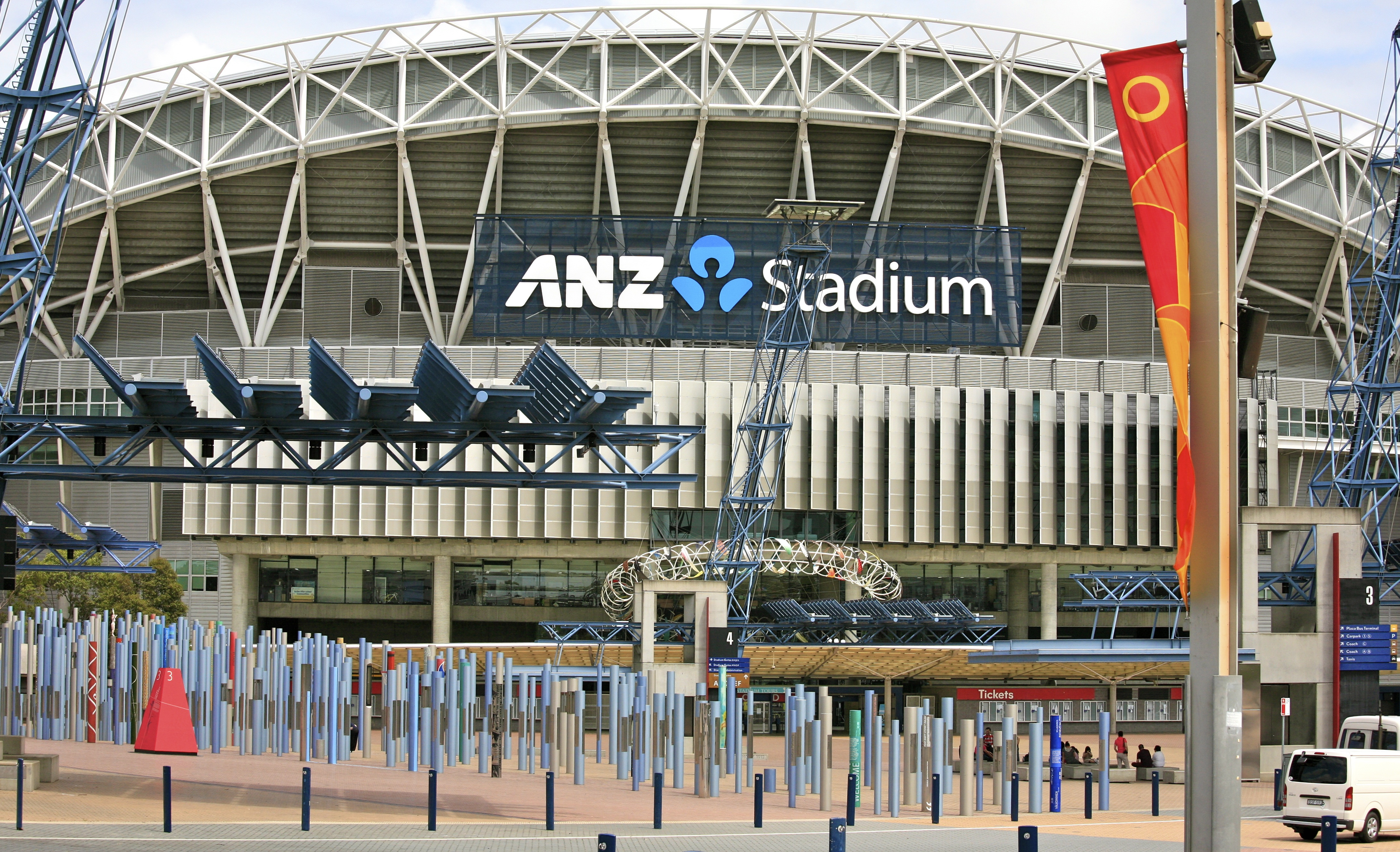
ANZ formerly held naming rights to Stadium Australia where it was known as ANZ Stadium

In 2005, an advertisement included two famous robots: Lost in Space robot, and a Dalek from Doctor Who, although the Dalek was replaced in subsequent versions of the ad. In 2006, the company started a TV campaign with a series of ads featuring their new mascot – the Falcon, a bird trained to stop credit card thieves, illustrating the company's measures in prevention of credit card fraud. In April 2024 this marketing strategy was relaunched.

In 2010, ANZ ran an ad campaign parodying common banking scenarios with a fictional character known as 'Barbara who lives in Bank World', a middle-aged, rude, sarcastic and unhelpful bank manager. The adverts have received acclaim for wit and humour, but also criticism for stereotyping bank managers. Barbara is portrayed by Australian comedian Genevieve Morris. In 2010, ANZ spent $195 million in Australia on advertising. In 2011, a series of ads were fronted by Simon Baker, the star of the American television show The Mentalist. According to a 2014 top 20 list of advertising spends, ANZ was in the top 20. In 2016, ANZ New Zealand had the highest spend of any bank. One third of ANZ's spend on media is said to be digital.

=== Sponsorship ===
In 2014, ANZ renewed its sponsorship with the Australian Open for a further five years. In 2015, ANZ held a campaign in sync with the Sydney Gay and Lesbian Mardi Gras.

== Symbols ==
=== Logos ===
ANZ has had a number of different logos throughout its history. Its current logo was designed by M&C Saatchi, and was introduced in 2009 to coincide with ANZ's ambition to be a major regional bank in the Asia Pacific. The 2009 logo introduces a stylised three-petaled lotus which represents the trinity of Australia, New Zealand and Asia Pacific, the three core markets of ANZ. The central human shape represents its customers and its people.

2001–2009

2009–present

=== Seals ===
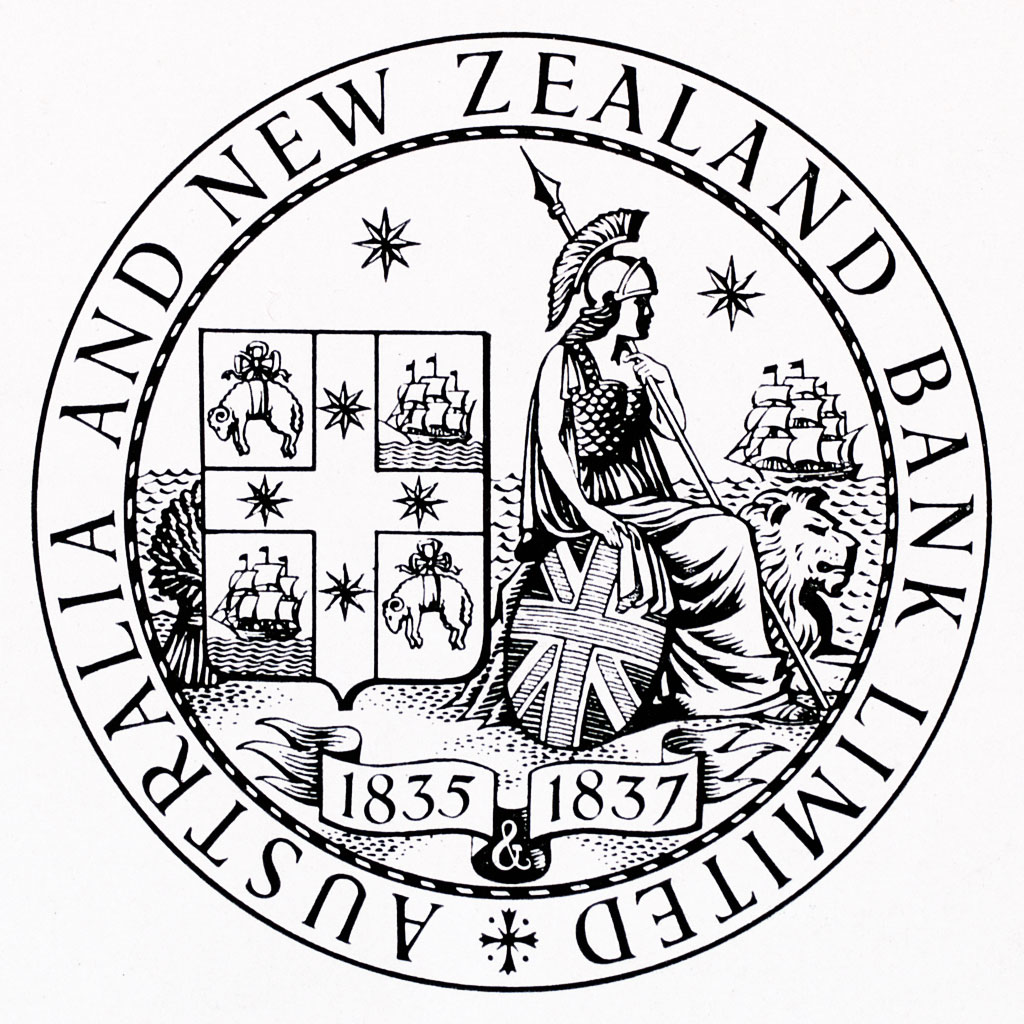
1951–1970

=== Coat of arms ===
Coat of arms of the Australia and New Zealand Banking Group
| Notes The arms of the Australia and New Zealand Banking Group comprise: Adopted 1990 Crest Upon a wreath of the colours an antelope and a unicorn both armed and crined Or and gorged with a collar Gules supporting saltirewise a key Gold and a sword Proper quillons hilt and pommel Gold. Helm A closed Helmet, mantling Azure doubled Or. Escutcheon Per pale Azure and Or a pile couped and per pale its point on a mound issuing in base also per pale eight roundels and as many billets in circle all counterchanged. Supporters On the dexter side a kangaroo Or and on the sinister side a kiwi Azure beaked and legged Gold. Compartment Desert and grass proper. Motto Tenacious of Purpose Badge Four mullets crosswise each of six points Argent dimidiating a like mullet Gules fimbriated Argent between them in circle a plate between two bezants. Symbolism The shield is divided in the centre in an allusion to the Bank's principal operations in Australia and New Zealand. This reference is repeated by the supporters of the shield (Kiwi representing NZ; Kangaroo representing Australia). The supporters stand on field of grass and desert, a reference to the pastoral, mineral and other industries served by the bank. The balanced triangular figure (the 'pile') in the shield denotes the importance of maintaining the confidence of the public, depositors and shareholders in banking. Its circular design of bezants and billets symbolise coins, notes, cheques and other paper which circulate through the banking system. The crest symbolises the defence of depositors', customers' and shareholders' interests and security. The crest is placed on the traditional wreath and helm of a corporation and features. The antelope and unicorn on the crest are taken from the supporters of the 1960 arms, and the first letters of which represent the former Australasia and Union banks. The motto, "Tenacious of Purpose", is a translation of the Latin motto granted to the ANZ Bank in 1960 which was the family motto of the bank's first chairman, Sir Geoffrey Gibbs. Previous versions Arms granted to Australia and New Zealand Bank Ltd on 6 September 1960. Escutcheon: Chequy Or and Azure, on a Chief Gold three Mullets of eight points also Azure. Crest: On a Wreath of the Colours a three-masted Ship proper, sails set Azure, each charged with a Mullet of eight points Or, the Pennons and Flag flying Gules. Supporters: On the dexter side an Heraldic Antelope Argent, attired and crined Or, and on the sinister side a Unicorn also Argent, armed and crined Gold, both collared Gules. Motto: Latin: Tenax Propositi. |

== Controversies ==
=== Manipulation of benchmark interest rates and other key metrics ===
In 2016, ANZ and 10 of its traders were named as being the subject of legal proceedings for manipulation of the benchmark inter-bank interest rates in Australia; specifically the Australian Securities & Investments Commission (ASIC) has made claims of unconscionable conduct and manipulation against ANZ. ANZ has attempted to deny the claims and says it will defend the claim in court. Formal filings of the originating process in these regards were made against ANZ on 4 March 2016. Since that time ASIC has compounded their claim against the ANZ. In a separate court appearance in November 2016 ANZ admitted to 10 instances of attempted cartel conduct regarding alleged manipulation of the Malaysian ringgit. The wider market rigging case has been reported as likely lasting into 2018.

=== Agriculture and child labour ===
ANZ has been the subject of claims that it has backed agriculture and timber companies that engage in so called 'land grabs'. In 2014, ANZ faced allegations that it funded a Cambodian sugar plantation that has involved child labour, military-backed land grabs, forced evictions and food shortages. In February 2020, ANZ reached a compensation deal to around 1,000 Cambodian families in a land dispute related to a sugar company that ANZ funded, agreeing to pay "the profit it earned from the loan to the affected communities" of an undisclosed amount.

=== Litigious approach ===
ANZ has also been criticised in the Australian Senate for its allegedly "hard boiled" approach to farmers exposed to the fallout from ANZ's purchase of the Landmark loan book. One submission to the Senate inquiry into bank conduct mentioned one farmer self-immolating after alleged defaults occurring. Another former customer in the Senate inquiry was mentioned as being subjected to victimisation by receivers and police, including use of SWAT teams and being held at gun-point. In 2016 it was reported that ANZ was accused of racism in a high-profile court case involving the businessman Pankaj Oswal and his wife; specifically it was reported that an email contained comments stating that, "We are dealing with Indians with no moral compass and an Indian woman [the wife of Mr. Oswal], as every bit as devious as PO (Pankaj Oswal)," and "This has been a very Indian characteristic transaction." The ANZ agreed to a settlement for an undisclosed amount in respect of the legal claim made by the Oswals.

=== Culture ===
ANZ CEO Shayne Elliott admitted in 2016 that "culture" will be one of the biggest challenges for ANZ. Media reports have included allegations of sexism, drug use and bravado culture. In 2016, ANZ was pursued in court over its suggesting on social media that criticism of the bank's chief financial officer might have been sexist, which resulted in the broker at Bell Potter losing his job. Former ANZ director John Dahlsen in 2016 admitted that there are issues with bank culture and competition. In November 2016, there were further claims of sexist conduct and a separate lawsuit was filed against ANZ in the United States regarding staff at its New York office.

=== Malaysian scandal ===
In early 2016, ANZ was also mentioned in a scandal in Malaysia involving one of ANZ's subsidiaries and the Malaysian leader. The incident has raised questions for ANZ. ANZ admitted in November 2016 that it had little ability to control its affiliate.

=== Misleading file notes presented to Victorian Supreme Court ===
In 2016, there was an incident reported involving the Financial Ombudsman Service (Australia), where the Financial Ombudsman Service presented misleading file notes to the Supreme Court of Victoria, in the discovery phase of a case involving ANZ, to the benefit of ANZ's case. The ANZ has not commented on the scandal as yet.

=== Out-sourcing of jobs ===
ANZ has continued to out-source jobs in countries other than Australia and this has caused some controversy with some outlets. ANZ have been progressively increasing work output from offshore offices. ANZ's Bangalore office has been operational since 1989, making it one of the first organisations to employ IT staff based in India. ANZ employs around 4,800 staff in Bangalore, India. 1500 IT positions, 2000 positions in Payments and Institutional Operations and International and High Value Services and 1300 positions in Operations Personal Banking have been shifted from Melbourne to India. In 2006, ANZ predicted that by 2010, over 2000 jobs would have been shifted from Australia to Bangalore. In 2012, ANZ transferred 360 permanent staff from Melbourne and Bangalore to Capgemini. All these staff worked in the Technology Testing and Environment Space. As ANZ CIO Anne announced earlier that ANZ want a Hybrid model of technology in order to achieve the 2017 Technology roadmap.

=== Anti-competitive conduct ===
Despite ANZ taking advantage of block-chain technology, ANZ had blocked businesses making use of Bitcoin. ANZ and others were investigated by the Australian Competition & Consumer Commission and cleared of colluding with other banks on the issue of Bitcoin based business.

=== Alleged discrimination ===
In September 2020, ANZ was accused of discrimination by Australian cryptocurrency exchanger Allan Flynn before the ACT Civil and Administrative Tribunal. The dispute is the first human rights action brought by a Bitcoin trader against a bank alleging discrimination on the basis of Flynn's "profession, trade, occupation, or calling" in violation of the Australian Capital Territory's anti-discrimination legislation. Flynn alleges ANZ denied him banking services on the basis of his occupation as a cryptocurrency exchanger by closing his and his brother's bank accounts and contacting another bank about his Bitcoin trading, allegedly causing the other bank to similarly deny him service. Interlocutory orders were made by the Tribunal in June 2021. The matter between Flynn and the bank was settled in October 2021 with ANZ admitting in a statement that had de-banked Flynn because he operated Bitcoin trading service, and that it could (subject to their defences) amount to discrimination, but that they believed doing so was necessary to mitigate exposure to regulatory risk. Flynn maintains, despite the settlement requiring him to withdraw the action, that ANZ's actions were unlawful.

=== Panama Papers ===
ANZ was reported as appearing in 7,548 of the Mossack Fonseca documents in the Panama Papers, reflecting the bank's extensive work in New Zealand, the Cook Islands, Samoa and Jersey.

=== Criminal cartel charges ===
On 1 June 2018, the Australian Competition & Consumer Commission (ACCC) announced that criminal cartel charges are expected to be laid by the Commonwealth Director of Public Prosecutions (CDPP) against ANZ Bank, its Group Treasurer Rick Moscati, along with Deutsche Bank, Citigroup and a number of individuals. The charges concern a $2.5 billion ANZ capital raising that took place in August 2015. In July 2020 committal proceedings were completed in the case, which may last into 2022.

=== Hayne Royal Commission ===
The Royal Commission into Misconduct in the Banking, Superannuation and Financial Services Industry, also known as the Hayne Royal Commission, was a Royal Commission established on 14 December 2017 by the Australian Government to inquire into and report on misconduct in the banking, superannuation, and financial services industry. The establishment of the commission followed revelations in the media of a culture of greed within several Australian financial institutions. A subsequent parliamentary inquiry recommended a royal commission, noting the lack of regulatory intervention by the relevant government authorities, and later revelations that financial institutions were involved in money laundering for drug syndicates, turned a blind eye to terrorism financing, and ignored statutory reporting responsibilities and impropriety in foreign exchange trading.

ANZ was also implicated in the bank bill swap rate scandal and settled with ASIC prior to the commencement of legal proceedings.

=== Defamation case ===
In July 2020 Bogac Ozdemir, a former employee of ANZ, filed a civil action against the bank at a New York court. Ozdemir claims that statements made by the bank about him were defamatory, and is seeking damages of US$20 million.

=== Document dumping ===
In 2023, confidential banking documents were found improperly disposed in a bin close to the ANZ branch in Armadale, Western Australia. The documents included names, addresses, account numbers, and transaction histories of customers with the branch, as well as internal banking procedures. Disposing of the documents rather than destroying them was reported as a serious breach of privacy laws.

== See also ==
- ATM Industry Association (ATMIA)
- Banking in Australia
- List of banks
- List of banks in Australia
- List of banks in Oceania
