= Town & Country Bank =

Former Australian building society

- Formerly: Town & Country Building Society
- Industry: Banking
- Founded: 1964
- Founder: James McCusker; Bob McKerrow
- Defunct: 1998
- Headquarters: Perth, Australia
- Number of employees: 650 (1990)
- Parent: ANZ Bank

The Town & Country Bank, formerly the Town & Country Building Society, was a building society that later became a bank headquartered in Perth and with branches throughout Western Australia.

[Sponsorships]

Town and Country were major sponsors of the Perth Wildcats (cheerleaders) West Coast Eagles, Western Warriors and major golfing events in Western Australia

== History ==
The Town & Country Building Society was founded in 1964 by James McCusker and Bob McKerrow.

In July 1990 it was acquired by the ANZ Bank from majority shareholders, the McCusker family and National Mutual. After being converted to a bank, in 1998 the brand was retired with operations absorbed by the ANZ Bank.
