= Bruce Hall (Australian National University) =

Residential college in Canberra

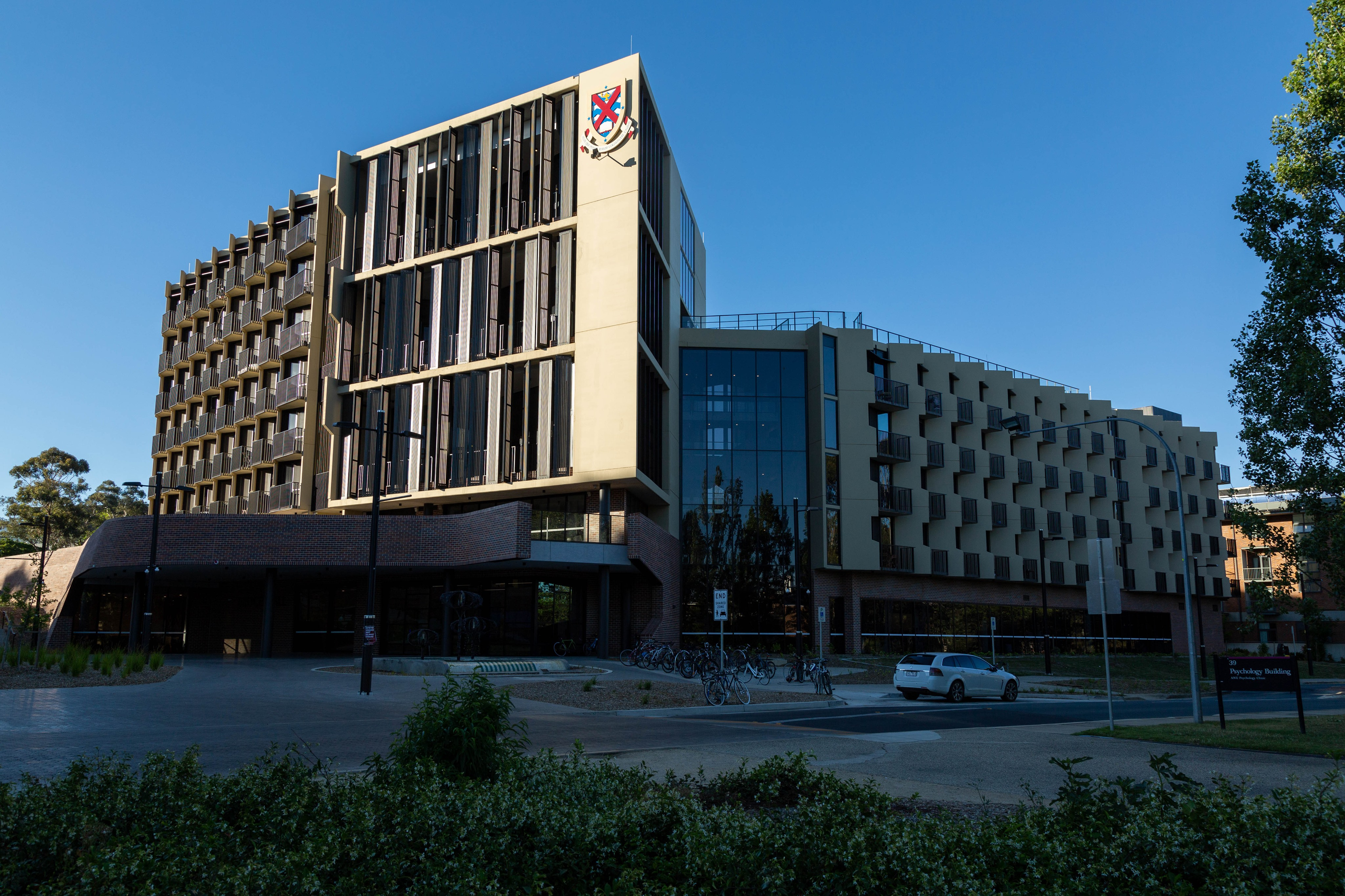
- Bruce Hall in 2019
- Motto: Latin: Felix Qui Potuit Rerum Cognoscere Causas (Happy is he who is able to discover the reason for things)
- Type: Public
- Established: 1961
- Head: Geraldine Schmid
- Students: 450
- Location: Canberra, Australia; 35.2742°S 149.1172°E
- Colours
- Nickname: Bruce
- Mascot: Ouroboros
- Website: www.anu.edu.au/study/accommodation/student-residences/bruce-hall-daley-road

Bruce Hall is a residential college of the Australian National University (ANU) in Canberra, Australia. Opened in 1961, the original Bruce Hall was the first undergraduate hall of residence at the university and the first mixed-gender undergraduate residence in Australia. The college has produced notable alumni across a range of fields.

The Hall's motto is "Felix Qui Potuit Rerum Cognoscere Causas", which means "Happy is he who is able to discover the reason for things".

In April 2017, following an extended battle against alumni and heritage groups, the ANU obtained final approval for demolition of Bruce Hall's historic buildings. Alumni condemned the decision. In February 2019, the ANU opened the renewed Bruce Hall alongside a new residence, Wright Hall, both on the site of the original residence.

== Description ==
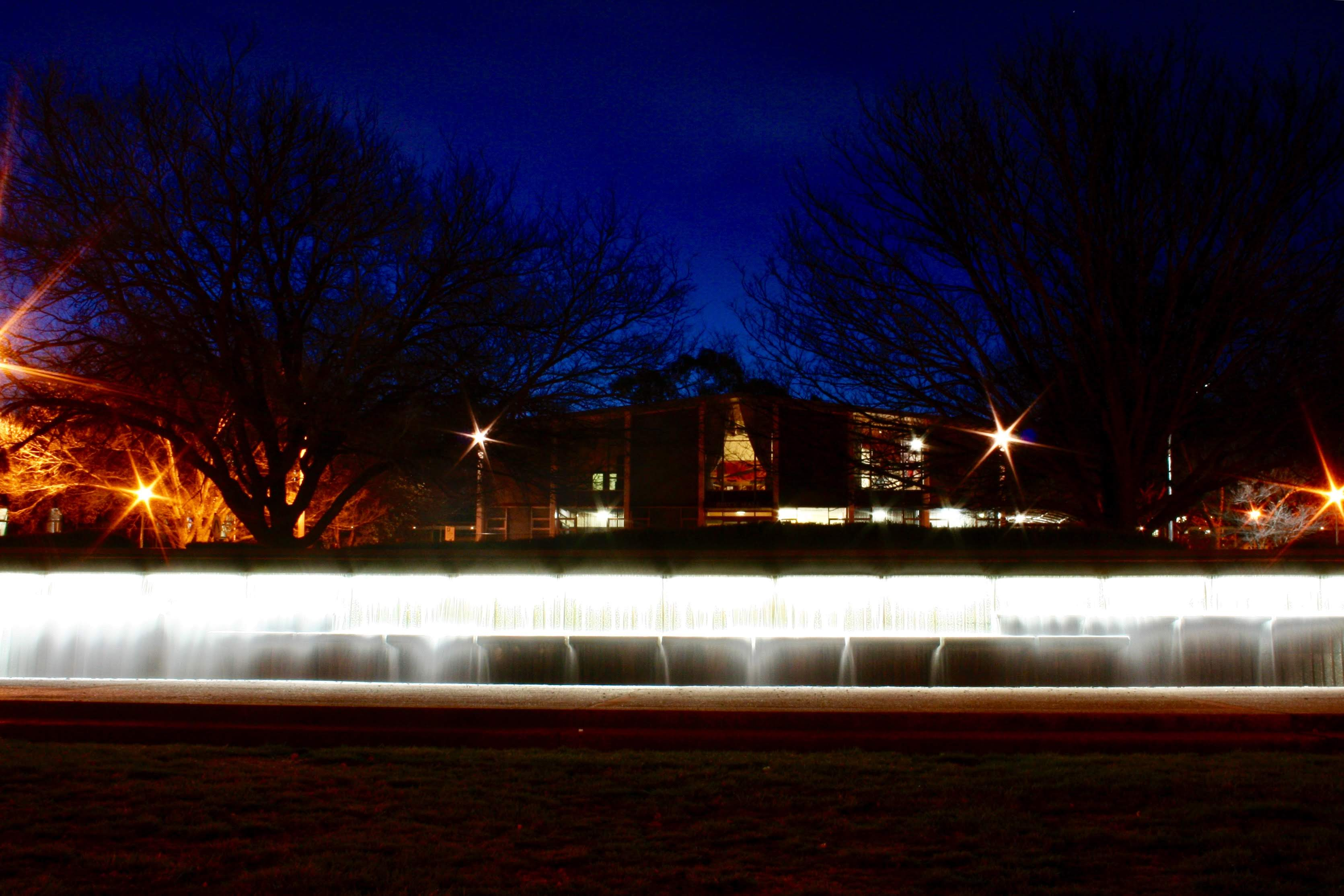
Old Bruce Hall at night in 2006

Bruce Hall is located on the campus of the Australian National University, along Daley Road, in the Dickson Precinct. It currently consists of a seven-storey building containing the Dining Hall and a separate four-storey Packard Wing.

=== Catered Wings ===
The catered wings are generally occupied by undergraduate students.

=== Self-Catered Wing ===
The Packard wing provides studios, both single and double occupancy, with individual kitchens and bathrooms for postgraduate and later-year undergraduate students.

== History ==
=== Foundation and development ===
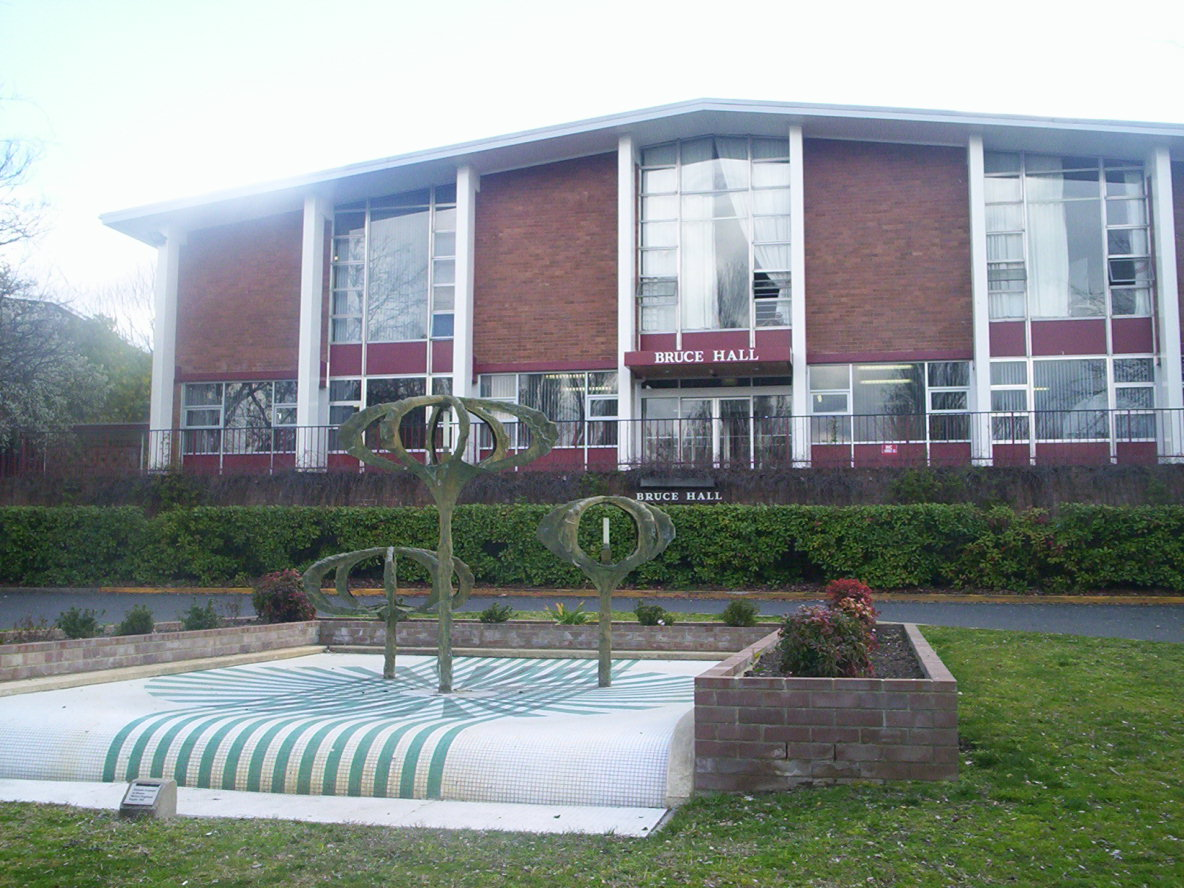
The original Bruce Hall in 2005

Bruce Hall is the oldest undergraduate residential hall on the Australian National University campus, being officially opened in 1961 (The oldest resident hall is University House opened in 1954 but exclusively for doctoral students). It originally consisted of just five wings, North, South, East, West and Central.

Bruce Hall was named after the former Prime Minister of Australia Stanley Bruce.

Historian Bill Gammage, an early resident, recalls that the college was opened by Prime Minister Robert Menzies. Gammage told the ABC in 2016: "because it was such a showpiece, a lot of famous visitors were there - the King and Queen of Thailand came at the same time as they opened the Menzies Library, I think the Queen herself might have been there at one time."

The first warden was Bill Packard OAM. He was instrumental in shaping the Hall's culture, developed Inward Bound, the ANU's premier inter-Hall sports event and continued to support the Hall's activities until his death in 2009.

In 1963 Motel Schreinerhof in Northbourne Avenue was taken over as an annexe for Bruce Hall and accommodated women students until 1965.

A shortcut between Clunies Ross Drive and Daley Road just south of Bruce Hall was closed by students digging a ditch. A petrol tanker became stuck in the ditch. The ANU promised to install concrete posts and turn the area into a garden.

In 1964 a revenge attack from Duntroon cadets smashed doors and windows and caused water damage after a car was set on fire on the Duntroon parade ground.

On 9 July 1965 Princess Alice, Countess of Athlone toured the ANU with a visit to Bruce Hall.

The sculptures in the pond at the front of Bruce Hall that look like egg beaters, were designed by Herbert Flugelman. They were commissioned in 1965 and to be completed in 1967.

Liquor was first sold to students at the hall on 1 June 1970.

Bruce Hall was audited by the Federated Liquor and Allied Trades Union, as it was accused of breaking the minimum time rule for casual workers. The ANU had claimed it was not subject to rulings of the Conciliation and Arbitration Commission as it was created by its own act of parliament, but later changed its position on the matter.

=== Demolition battle ===
In March 2016, the Canberra Times reported that the "Australian National University denies it has plans to demolish the university's oldest undergraduate residential college Bruce Hall as it moves to redevelop the 55-year-old complex to expand the university's student accommodation", but noted fears among alumni that the decision had already been made. The college then stood as a 240-bed catered on-campus residence. A 2012 site inventory of the ANU Acton Campus in 2012 had noted that the original Bruce Hall met the criteria for Commonwealth Heritage.

Alumni mobilised to oppose the ANU's plans. Journalist Karen Hardy, a former resident, wrote of the ANU's proposals in the Fairfax Press: "It's not about being an '800-bed facility', Bruce Hall isn't a hospital, or a prison, or a hotel. It's about giving kids a home, and a heart, and a place they can return to 30 years down the track and realise just how much those two things are intertwined. We can't let them knock it down." Historian Bill Gammage, a former resident, told the ABC that even considering demolition would be "alarming" because the hall "self evidently has so many advantages in terms of tradition and student comfort and so on". In June 2016, Andrew Hargrave, a former president of the college, also made the case for preservation in the Fairfax press:

"Bruce Hall is a campus landmark, designed to create a 'monumental effect' at the top of University Avenue. It was the ANU's first undergraduate hall of residence, and the first in Australia to admit both men and women – a liberal concept that soon spread nationally. Renowned Canberra designers Fred Ward and Derek Wrigley furnished the buildings, and the Dining Hall is one of two 'grand halls' on campus (the other is at University House, which is already heritage listed). Even the ANU's own 2012 heritage assessment proclaimed Bruce Hall's heritage value as 'high' and that it 'meets the criteria for Commonwealth Heritage List'. Despite this, the ANU has advised current students and alumni that it will demolish Bruce Hall, for reasons that simply don't stack up.

— Andrew Hargrave, Sydney Morning Herald, 3 June 2016

The ANU confirmed its plans to demolish the iconic college and replace it with two higher-density accommodation buildings in September 2016. The ANU had secured funds for replacing Bruce Hall from philanthropist former residents Graham and Louise Tuckwell, and funds from the new high-density residences would be channeled to the Tuckwell Scholarship Program.

An alumni association had formed to oppose the ANU's demolition plans and carried their campaign all the way to the Federal Court. The Bruce Hall Alumni Association argued that the hall had significant social and architectural values and should not be destroyed. The Canberra Times reported on 4 April 2017: "The head of the Bruce Hall Alumni Association says some devastated former residents will never return to the Australian National University after the Federal Court gave the green light for demolition to begin on the residential college."

Demolishing Bruce Hall was also a significant loss for the architectural community, as reported in ArchitectureAu on 7 April 2017:

It was designed by architect Walter Bunning of Bunning & Madden Architects and completed in 1961. The firm designed a number of public buildings in Canberra and Sydney and won the 1962 Sulman Medal for Liner House in Bridge Street, Sydney.

A heritage assessment stated, “Bruce Hall is representative of the late-twentieth century stripped classical style of architecture, as implemented by Bunning and Madden. The building displays several key features of the style including its inherent symmetry and restrained material palette. The building is one [of] few examples of a residential college designed by the firm in Australia and the only one at ANU. “The original furniture in Bruce Hall is representative of the work of the ANU Design Unit headed by Fred Ward, with much of the design work for this building undertaken by Derek Wrigley who went on to become head of the Design Unit.”

ANU's own heritage assessment of Bruce Hall concluded it was of “high” heritage ranking and it “meets the criteria for Commonwealth Heritage List.“

— Linda Cheng, Architecture Australia, 7 April 2017

== Admissions ==
Admission to Bruce Hall is through the Australian National University's University Accommodation Services. Prospective residents apply through that office and are allocated places at the various halls and colleges on the university based on preferences.

== Administration ==
Bruce Hall is administered by the Australian National University's Accommodation Service (UAS) in conjunction with the Facilities and Services Division. The University Accommodation Service appoints a Head of Hall and a Residential Wellbeing Coordinator. Various students are appointed as Community Coordinators and Senior Residential Scholars, who are residents of the hall assisting the administration team in the day-to-day operation of the hall.

== Organisations within the hall ==
=== Association of Residents ===
Bruce Hall has an association of residents whose objectives are to serve and represent the members in all matters, to promote within the Hall a community spirit by means of cultural, sporting and social events, and to advance the interests of the Hall as a whole.

The committee also publishes a year book called Ouroboros, encompassing all the activities and events of the year.

==== Junior Common Room, 1961-2004 ====
The first Bruce Hall association of residents was established in 1961 as the Junior Common Room.

==== Bruce Hall Residents' Association, 2005-2006 ====
The name of the committee was changed in 2005 with the adoption of a new constitution, with the original intention of a possible incorporation, which did not come to fruition.

==== Bruce Hall Common Room, 2006-current ====
Under directive from the Australian National University legal office in anticipation of Voluntary Student Unionism legislation, the committee removed the word association from its title to avoid any perceived confusion with student unions and renamed itself to the "Bruce Hall Common Room Committee" at its annual general meeting held on 11 October 2006.

=== Learning Communities ===
Bruce Hall provides Learning Communities for residents who desire assistance in their areas of learning and other areas of interest. A variety of processes are in place to help residents with university courses and the advancement of other issues.

There are currently five Learning Communities:

- Asia-Pacific
- Middle East
- Rhetoric
- Arts
- Sustainability

=== Bruce Green ===
Bruce Green is an organisation of individuals interested in environmental and sustainability issues within the hall.

=== Bruce Hall Players ===
The Bruce Hall Players is a group of residents who produces and acts out an annual Bruce Hall play. Previous plays include:

- 1991: The Importance of Being Earnest
- 1992: Charley's Aunt
- 1993: The Mouse that Roared
- 1995: Twelfth Night
- 1996: Don's Party
- 1997: Antigone
- 1998: Picasso at the Lapin Agile
- 1999: Little Shop of Horrors
- 2000: Accidental Death of an Anarchist
- 2001: Kiss Me, Kate
- 2002: Death By Chocolate
- 2004: The Highway Man
- 2005: Psyche and Persephone
- 2006: Robin Hood, People in Tights
- 2007: League: The Musical
- 2008: The Bruce Brothers
- 2009: Brucegate
- 2010: Sandora's Box
- 2011: Grimmly Spectacular [The Brother's Grimm Spectaculathon]
- 2012: The Book of Everything
- 2013: Away
- 2014: The Physicists
- 2015: Black Coffee
- 2016: Cosi
- 2017: Kill Me, Deadly!
- 2018: Noises Off
- 2019: The Resistible Rise of Arturo Ui
- 2020: Romeo and Juliet
- 2021: Dimity Smyth is Dead
- 2022: Star Wars: Revenge of the Sith
- 2023: The Musical Comedy Murders of 1940
- 2024: And the Big Men Fly High

ANU students performed Everyman at Bruce Hall in June 1966.

Jodi McAlister, the author of the Bruce Hall plays in 2004, 2005 and 2006, has since written a trilogy of young adult fiction novels, the Valentine series, published by Penguin Australia.

== Sports and Arts ==
Bruce Hall has a tradition in inter-collegiate sports and arts, having won the inter hall sports shield in 1998, 1999, 2000, 2023 and 2024 and the inter hall arts shield in 2004, 2006, 2013 and 2021.

As reflected in the Sports Ethos, the hall prides itself on participation more than success and places high emphasis on standards of sportsmanship.

== Publications ==
=== Cross Sections ===
In 2005, the first edition of Cross Sections: The Bruce Hall Academic Journal was published. The Journal seeks to be an inter-disciplinary work with both undergraduates, honours students and postgraduates contributing.

Since its inception, the Journal has been funded wholly by the university, which ensures all residents receive a copy free of charge each year.

Since 2006, publishing of Cross Sections has been through Epress, the ANU's publishing unit. The work is now available as a free online download or in physical form on a pay-per-copy basis.

=== Newsletter ===
The hall newsletter was once called Raving Dragon but was renamed to Ignis Draconis in March 2001.

=== Internal web ===
An internal website formerly existed with address http://dragonlair.anu.edu.au.

== Notable alumni ==
=== Law ===
- Stephen Gageler AC: Chief Justice of the High Court of Australia.

=== Business ===
- Graham Tuckwell AO: philanthropist.

=== Literature ===
- Bill Gammage AM: writer and historian.
- Jodi McAlister: writer and academic.

=== Media ===
- Mara Lejins: Chaser on The Chase Australia.

=== Sports ===
- Frank Farina OAM: soccer coach.
- Tal Karp: soccer player, Australian Women's Soccer Team.

=== Public service ===
- Anna Brakey: Commissioner of the Australian Competition & Consumer Commission.
- Chris Higgins: Secretary of the Department of Treasury.

== Other Events ==
Bruce Hall used to house the National Mathematics Summer School every January.
