= Walter Bunning =

Australian architect

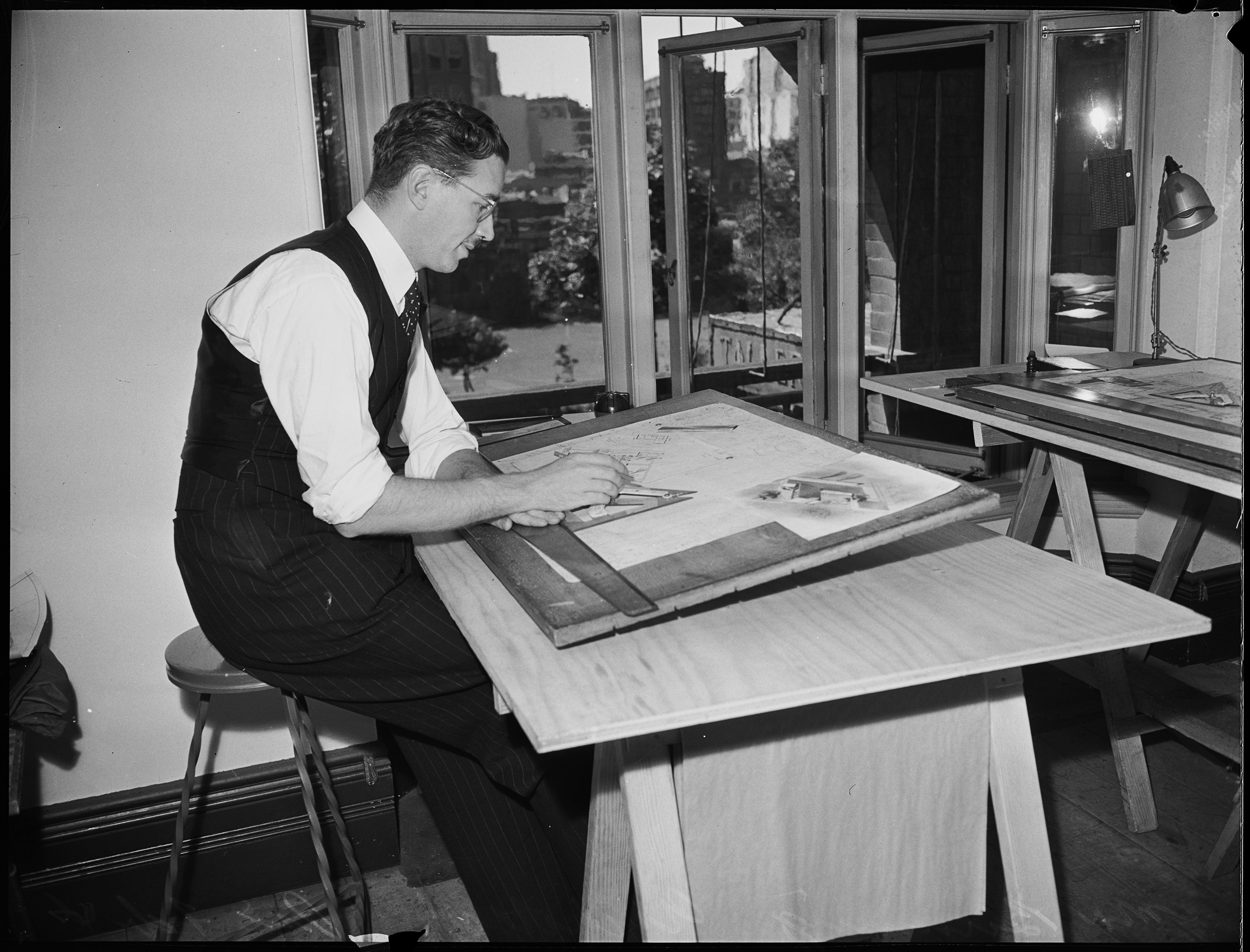
- Walter Bunning architect, Australia, 1946
- Born: 19 May 1912; South Brisbane, Queensland
- Died: 13 October 1977 (aged 65); Sydney
- Occupation: Architect
- Awards: RIBA Bronze Medal: Anzac House (1957); Sir John Sulman Medal: Liner House (1962)
- Practice: Carlyle Greenwell; Stephenson & Meldrum; H. Ruskin Rowe; Bunning and Madden
- Buildings: Bunning House, 8 Ryrie Street, Mosman (1952); Liner House (1960); Bruce Hall, Australian National University (1961); International House, The University of Sydney (1967); National Library of Australia (1968)
- Design: Homes in the Sun (published in 1945)

Walter Ralston Bunning CMG (19 May 1912 – 13 October 1977) was an Australian architect and urban planner.

== Early life ==
Bunning was born in Brisbane, the twin son of George Edward Bunning (an English-born pastoralist) and his wife Edwina Mary Huey, née Edkins (a Queenslander). During the depression he moved to Sydney to study at East Sydney Technical College graduating in 1936. He then worked in the offices of Carlyle Greenwell and Stephenson & Meldrum while attending Sydney Technical College at night. After his graduation he was awarded a travelling scholarship by the Board of Architects of New South Wales and from 1937–1939 he travelled throughout Europe and North America working for prominent architects in London, Dublin and New York. According to Johnson, it was this time overseas that became a crucial time in the evolution of Bunning's design and thought, inspiring modernist design and ideas that could be brought back and applied to Australia.

== Working life ==
In 1938 Bunning returned to Australia and helped to establish the Sydney arm of the Modern Architectural Research Society (MARS), with Arthur Baldwinson which was modelled on the famous British organisation of the same name. During World War II Bunning worked for the Australian Government, mainly designing camouflage schemes. In Australia, Bunning designed the first example of Radburn design housing for a housing estate for workers at the Commonwealth Munitions works in St Marys, Sydney, from 1942. In 1943 Bunning was appointed executive officer of the Commonwealth Housing Commission writing much of its influential 1944 report, which according to many scholars became a virtual text book for planners.

=== Homes in the Sun ===
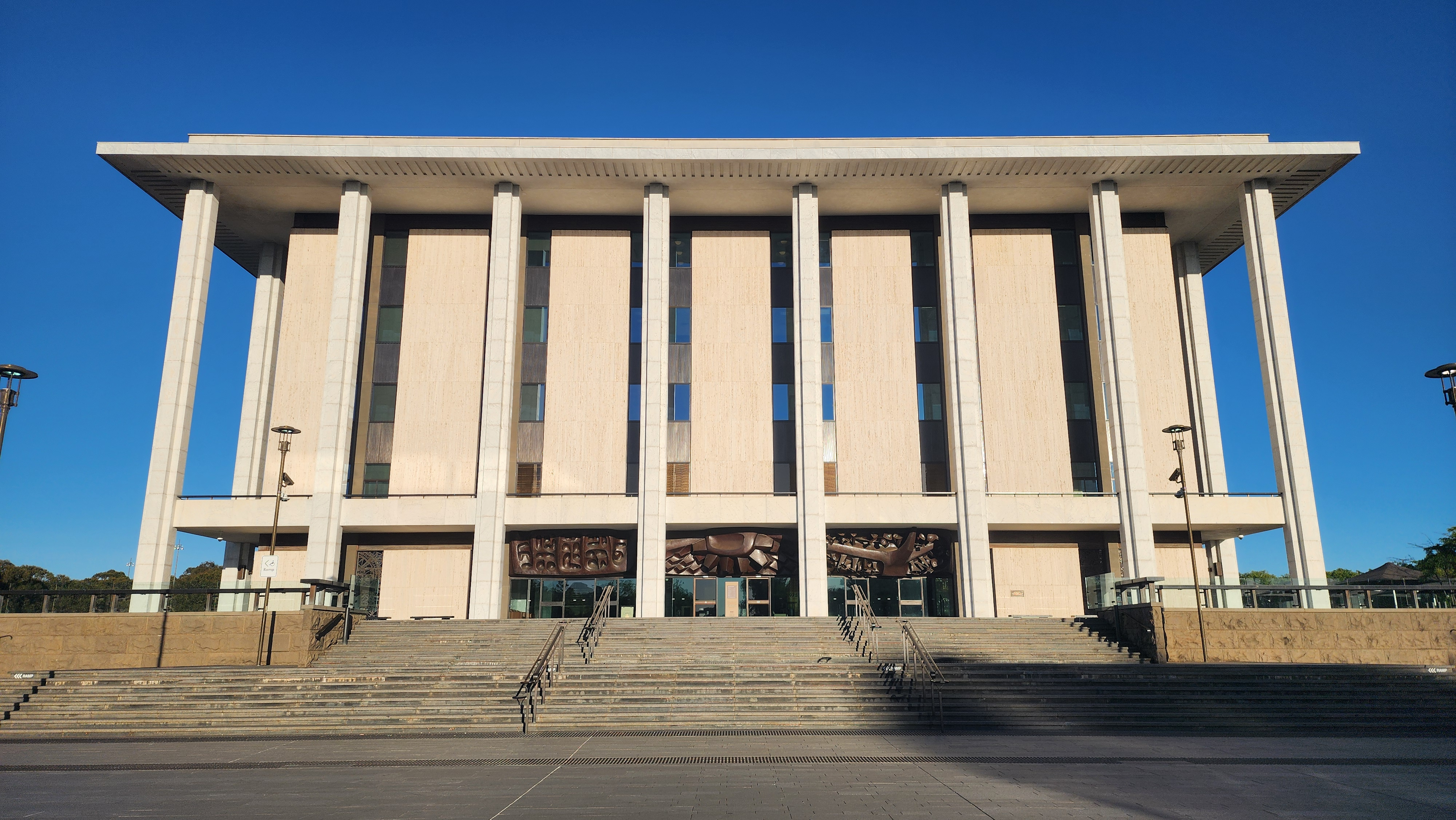
National Library of Australia

Stemming from his work with the Commonwealth Housing Commission in 1945 Bunning published Homes in the Sun. The book advocated better designed homes, communities, towns and regions to suit the Australian environment. This according to Robin Boyd, established Bunning as 'the best known architectural publicist in the country'. The dream for postwar planning in Australia for which Bunning highly advocated was displayed clearly throughout the book, with the most prominent example being a proposed attempt to develop Sydney's first satellite town, which according to Freestone was "refined in later writings". Bunning envisaged a town for 10,000 people, which would provide the best of country and city living in one, with the community areas and industrial areas separated to prevent pollution. There would be a clear separation of transport modes and the communities would also be separated, each serviced by their own facilities. With the town defined by a green belt, an area where any further metropolitan sprawl would be contained. This according to Freestone "synthesised the ideas of Ebenezer Howard and Le Corbusier into a normative formula".

The same year Homes in the Sun was published Bunning formed his own private architectural firm, joining up with Charles Madden in 1946. The Sydney-based firm, Bunning and Madden, over the next 25 years designed many public and private buildings in Sydney and Canberra, including winning the 1949 competition for the design of Anzac House, Sydney. The firm's most famous work was the National Library of Australia in Canberra. The firm had many other successful designs such as Liner House (1960) and International House, The University of Sydney (1967). However in 1957 the firm learned that it had failed in its bid to design the Sydney Opera House.

== Career twilight ==
The late 60s to his death saw the twilight of Bunning's planning career. Bunning became a highly sought after planning figure as both state governments and private developers became resolved for Bunning to act as an independent adviser on major planning issues. This according to Freestone led to the phrase "Send for Bunning'.... as he became a kind of 'ombudsman extraordinary' helping the government 'out of tight spots".

In 1970 Bunning was appointed to the Sydney Cove Redevelopment Authority (SCRA), this proved to be a controversial project with Bunning forced to bear some responsibility for plans to build high-rise hotels and office blocks in The Rocks, Sydney.

Although Bunning chaired many architectural and planning bodies, he did find time to support other interests, becoming a trustee of the Art Gallery of New South Wales in 1958 and taking over as president from 1974 until his death of a cerebral tumour in 1977.

== Oral history ==
Bunning was interviewed twice in 1971 about his life and career. Once by Hazel de Berg, and the second by Denise Hickey. The recordings of these can be found at the National Library of Australia.

Government offices
Preceded by Erik Langker	President of the Board of Trustees of the Art Gallery of New South Wales; 1974 – 1977	Succeeded by John Nagle
