= Felix, qui potuit rerum cognoscere causas =

Verse from "Georgics" by Virgil

"Felix, qui potuit rerum cognoscere causas" is verse 490 of Book 2 of the Georgics (29 BC), by the Latin poet Virgil (70 – 19 BC). It is literally translated as: "Fortunate, who has been able to know the causes of things". Dryden rendered it: "Happy the Man, who, studying Nature's Laws, / Thro' known Effects can trace the secret Cause" (The works of Virgil, 1697).

Virgil may have had in mind the Roman philosopher Lucretius, of the Epicurean school.

== Uses ==
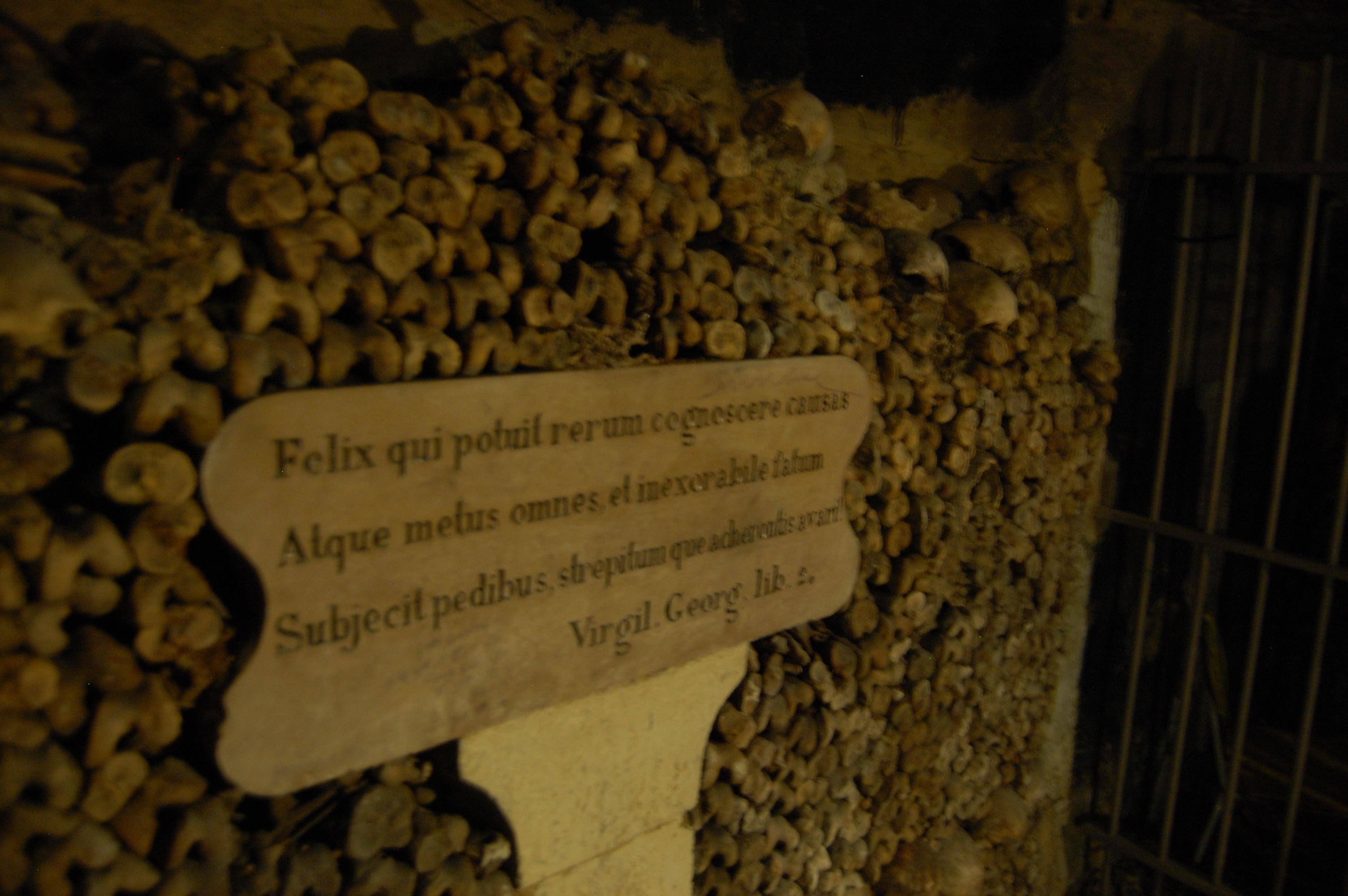
The verse on display in the Catacombs of Paris

This sentence is often written with a present tense instead of the past tense: "Felix, qui potest rerum cognoscere causas" ("Fortunate is he, who is able to know the causes of things"). Translators have also often added the adjective "hid" or "hidden" to qualify the causes.

The full verse states:

Fēlīx quī potuit rērum cognōscere causās

Atque metūs omnēs, et inexōrābile fātum

Subiēcit pedibus, strepitumque Acherontis avārī

Which translates to:

He who’s been able to learn the causes of things is happy,

and has set all fear, and unrelenting fate, and the noise

of greedy Acheron, under his feet.

The latter half of the phrase, "rerum cognoscere causas", is the motto of the London School of Economics, the University of Sheffield, Bruce Hall (residential college of the Australian National University), Humberside Collegiate, the University of Guelph, Hill Park Secondary School in Hamilton, Ontario, the IVDI lecture hall of the University of Debrecen, the Science National Honor Society, the Royal Military College of Science, the German newspaper Der Tagesspiegel and the Romanian National Defense College.

In 1798, the city of Geneva was annexed by the French Republic. The French Resident in Geneva was one Félix Desportes. An incident involving the desecration of the French tricolor flag was used as the impetus for French invasion. Throughout the streets of Geneva, citizens chanted the phrase as it was assumed the incident was staged by the French as cause to invade. The dual meaning of "Félix" and "Felix" was not lost on the Genevans.

The phrase is engraved in the stone bust of Clodomiro Picado Twight in the University of Costa Rica, in San Pedro and also engraved on a stone fireplace at the Henry Wallace building in the Tropical Agricultural Research and Higher Education Center (CATIE) in Turrialba, Costa Rica.

It appears prominently on a board in the 1990 film Awakenings (at time 1:06:19). The sentence also appears in Latin in the English-language edition of Asterix and Obelix All at Sea on page 41. The reply to this sentence is: "Never Mind The Potty Causes Now!"
