= Bert Flugelman =

Australian sculptor

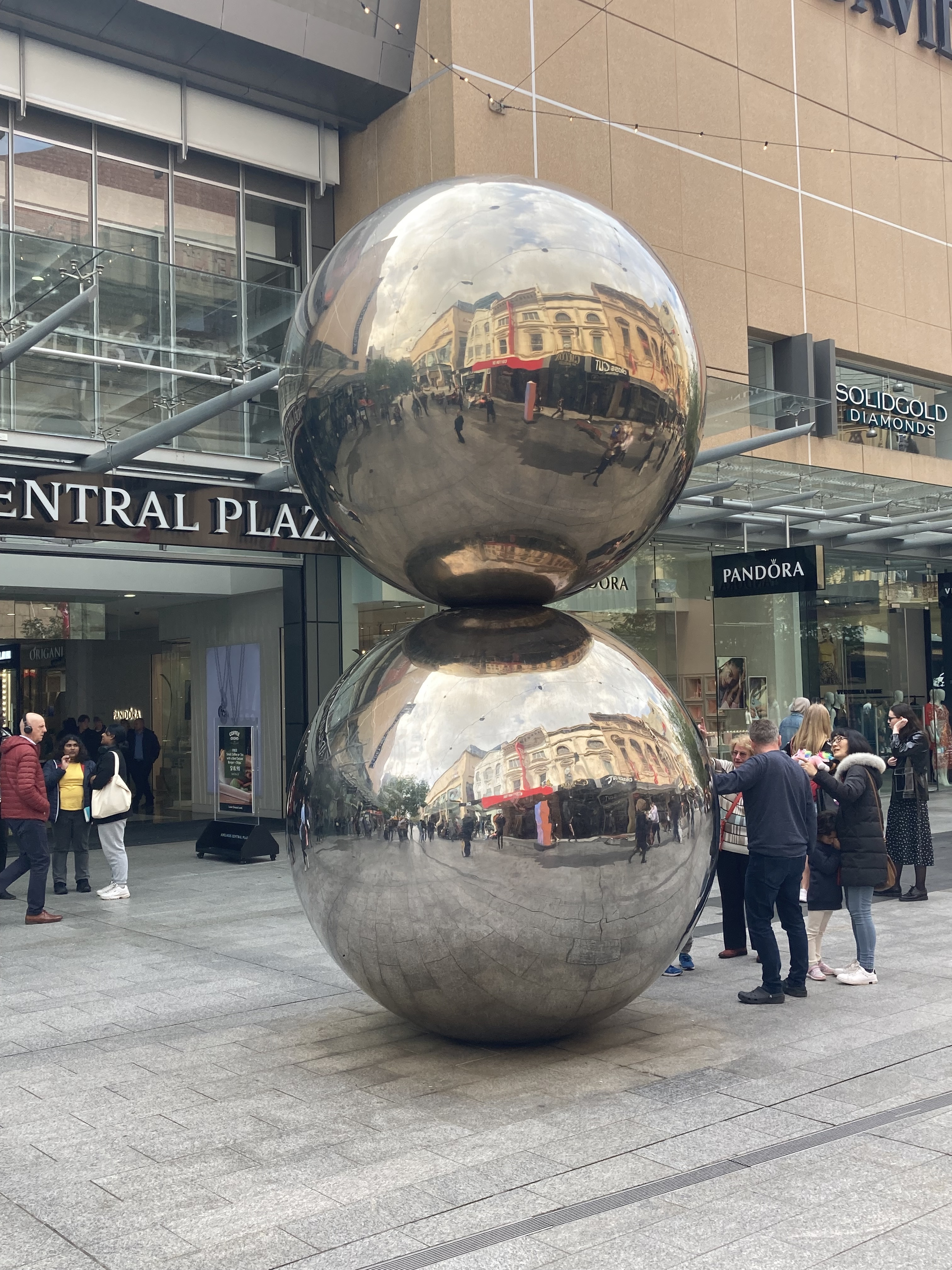
The Spheres in Rundle Mall, Adelaide

Herbert Flugelman AM (28 January 1923 – 26 February 2013), commonly known as Bert, was a prominent Australian visual artist, primarily recognised for his sculptures. He became particularly well known for his stainless steel geometric public artworks, several of which have become familiar landmarks. Among his best-known works are The Spheres (popularly nicknamed the Mall's Balls) in Adelaide, Pyramid Tower in Sydney and Cones in the sculpture garden of the National Gallery of Australia in Canberra.

== Early life and education ==
Herbert Flugelman was born in Vienna, Austria, on 28 January 1923, the son of Leopold and Irma Flugelman (née Feldman). As the Nazis came to power in the 1930s, Leopold was the first to come to Australia, in his official capacity as an agent for the German fabric company he worked for. He then arranged visas for his second wife, Annie, and Herbert to come as well. After queuing for three days for a train leaving Vienna, Herbert was initially turned away for not having the right papers. His uncle intervened, telling the guards that they were supposed to be getting rid of Jews, and Herbert was allowed to board. He met Annie in Genoa, Italy, where in 1938 they boarded a boat to Fremantle, Western Australia, before travelling to Sydney. Leopold got a job as a hotel doorman, later becoming manager. Herbert's mother Irma also escaped to Australia, initially to London and then moving to the United States after the war, where she remarried.

Flugelman first worked as a jackaroo. From 1943 to 1946 Flugelman served in the Australian Army (although, being a foreign national, he was not allowed to fight).

From 1948 to 1951, he studied at the National Art School (East Sydney Technical College) in Sydney, where he studied painting under Frank Hinder.

== Career ==
From 1951 to 1955, he travelled to Europe, including a visit in 1954 to Spain with his artist friend John Copnall. In 1952, he contracted polio in Vienna, spending some time being treated in a London hospital. The disease left him with severe disabilities in one arm and one leg. However, this did not stop him holding several successful exhibitions at the Piccadilly Gallery in London, including his first solo exhibition. He then moved to New York City, where his work was exhibited in the Bourne Gallery. He returned to Australia in 1955.

After a fire destroyed much of his work in his studio, Flugelman reassessed his career, and started to concentrate on sculpture. His first commission was by an Australian oil company in 1962, and other commissions followed, notably a bronze sculpture for UNSW (1964) and a copper and ceramic fountain for ANU (1966). In 1967, he created a sculpture called Equestrian, and in 1969, Black Box. In 1972, he created a work of performance art, called Burning Euphonium, in which he doused flames on a sculpture.

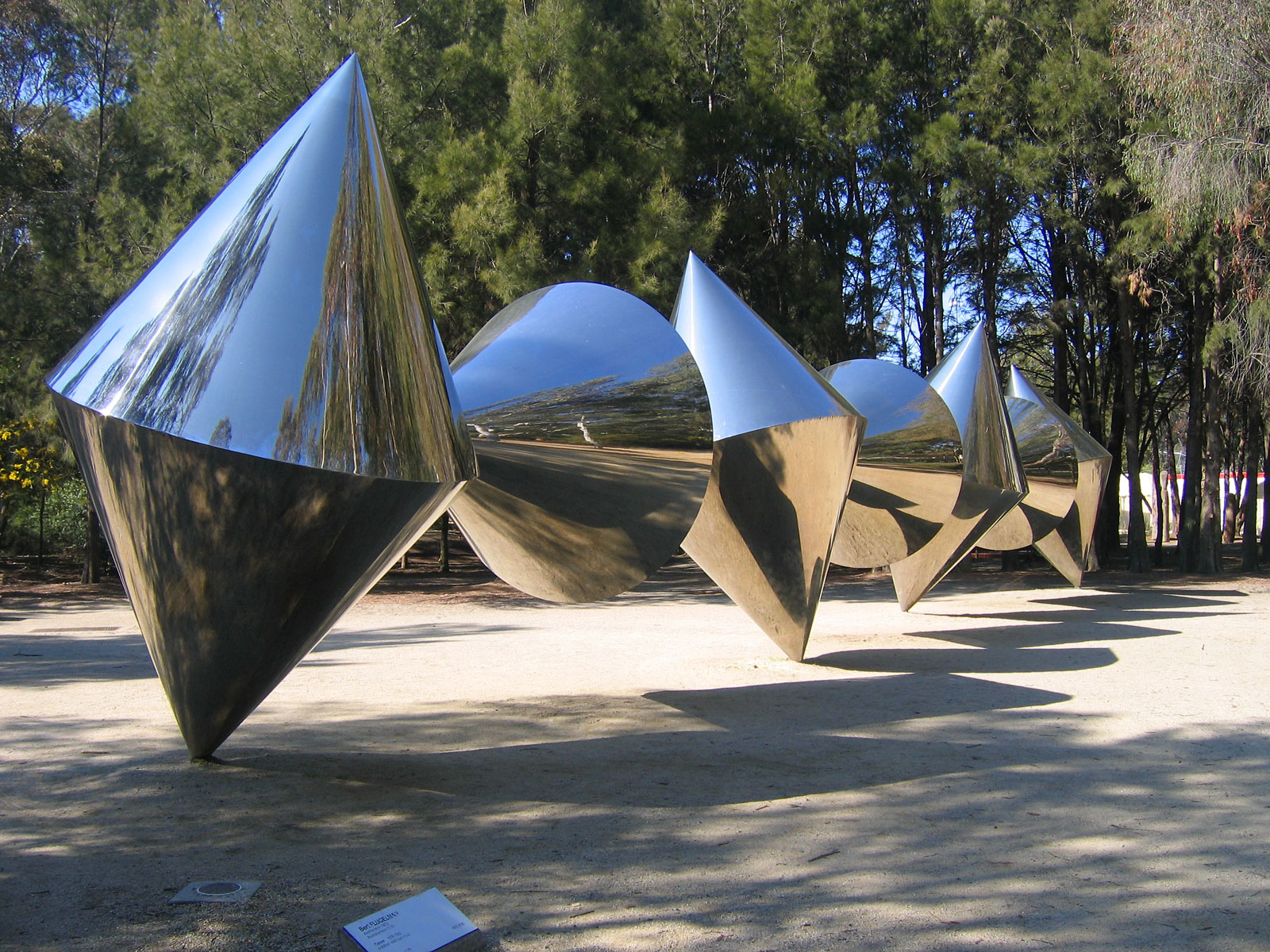
Cones (1976-1982) in the Sculpture Garden of the National Gallery of Australia, Canberra

However, a particular sculpture created in 1971, comprising six tetrahedrons, proved to be a turning point in his career. First shown at Hawthorn Art Gallery, it was subsequently exhibited at several locations in ensuing years. A 1972 exhibition at the Watters Gallery in Sydney was also significant.

In 1972, Flugelman moved to Adelaide. From 1972 to 1983, Flugelman was a lecturer at the South Australian School of Art, and subsequently became head of sculpture. During this period, he completed some of his most famous work, in particular Tetrahedra, also known as Festival Sculpture (1974/5), at the Adelaide Festival Centre; Spheres, popularly known as the Mall's Balls (1977), in Rundle Mall, Adelaide; and Cones (1982), at the National Gallery of Australia in Canberra. Tetrahedra consists of seven tetrahedra made of shiny polished stainless steel, and reflects the 1970s Australian modernist style of the Adelaide Festival Centre. During this period, he also lectured at the City Art Institute in Sydney (now UNSW Art & Design).

From 1984 to 1990, Flugelman was senior lecturer and fellow at the School of Creative Arts, University of Wollongong. In 1991, he was made professorial fellow at the university, and in 1995 received an honorary Doctorate of Creative Art (Honoris Causa). In 1997, he received the Australia Council, Visual Arts/Craft Fund, Emeritus Award.

In 2008, a hard-bound survey of his post-1968 sculptures, primarily his stainless-steel work, was published by The Watermark Press. It was written by Emeritus Professor Peter Pinson (whose Sydney art gallery represented Flugelman), with photography by David Perry. The book was designed by Harry Williamson.

== Art practice ==
After starting his career with painting, Flugelman turned to sculpture in the late 1950s after fire destroyed his studio. He began creating semi-figurative expressionist sculptures, then from the late 1960s he helped to lead a new wave of practices, with range of forms that included object-based sculptures as well as installations along with works of conceptual and performance art.

He experimented with a variety of materials, including ceramics, fibreglass, and aluminium, but his preferred medium was stainless steel, which he felt linked to the environment because of its reflectiveness.

He had a strong commitment to experimental art, which, according to artist and critic Donald Brook, "prevented him from acquiring a signature 'style' of the sort that would have projected him into the art history books in the usual way".

== Group activities ==
Flugelman helped to run Tin Sheds art collective at Sydney University from 1969 to 1972. He was also a founding member of Optronic Kinetics, a group who produced kinetic sculptures and other projects.

He was a founding member of the Experimental Art Foundation (EAF) in Adelaide in 1974. Initiated by Donald Brook, he was joined by Flugelman (who had moved from Sydney at Brook's suggestion), Ian North, Clifford Frith, and Phil Noyce. According to Brook, the EAF was "an engine for shaping beliefs about the meaning of works of art and the point of making them".

Flugelman as Lecturer in Sculpture along with Max Lyle as Head of Sculpture at the South Australian School of Art helped facilitate the establishment of South Australian Workshop (SAW) - Artist Cooperative at 7 Rutland Place, Adelaide in July 1978. Flugelman was an active member for several years.

Most of the first members of SAW were ex-graduate students direct from the SA School of Art (Sculpture Dept) who completed their studies in 1977. The idea formed from the need to have a workspace for mostly sculpture graduates so they could make a better transition from Art School life to life as a practicing artist. SAW facilitated over 75 South Australian artists until closing in the early 2000s.

== Personal life ==
In 1948, he met Betty Green at a dance on the beach at Cronulla, and soon afterwards they married and travelled to Europe.

Flugelman later married to Rosemary (nee Pryor), with whom he had four children; he was also stepfather to three others.

He lived in the village of Jambaroo, near Wollongong, from 1983.

== Recognition and criticism ==
- 1985: Subject of an Archibald Prize-winning portrait by his friend Guy Warren, Flugelman with Wingman
- 2006: Member of the Order of Australia

Flugelman's career was not without controversy, such as Pyramid Tower, aka "The Silver Shish Kebab", a 19-metre (62 ft) tower of stainless steel pyramids and tetrahedra, placed in Martin Place, Sydney. After being heavily criticised by Sydney Lord Mayor Frank Sartor, the sculpture was moved to the corner of Spring and Pitt Streets. Pyramid Tower was a commissioned work, created as a memorial to William Dobell.

Another work which attracted press coverage was his satirical sculptural portrait of British prime minister Margaret Thatcher, created accidentally when sawing wood with a chainsaw when he was living in a rainforest near Kiama, south of Sydney.

Max Cullen wrote in 2002:

Much of Flugelman's work can be seen as a triumph of the human spirit — the dignified complex aspect that makes us feel good about ourselves. Not all of Bert Flugelman's scupture [sic] is designed to be taken too seriously. His gigantic Boule, a salute to the popular French sport, is testimony that art can be pure fun.

== Death and legacy ==
Flugelman died on 26 February 2013 at his home in Bowral, on the Southern Highlands of New South Wales. His memorial service was held at Eastern Suburbs Memorial Park in Sydney.

Flugelman's archives are held in the Art Gallery of NSW's National Art Archive and in the Research Library and Archives of the National Gallery of Australia.

According to artist and critic Donald Brook, Flugelman had a profound effect on the "conservative art world" Adelaide in the 1970s, and influenced many still practising artists "not only because of his exemplary teaching and captivating personality. It owed a good deal to his ability to conjure large and surprisingly popular works of public sculpture out of an intractable material".

== Collections ==
Flugelman's work is held in collections around Australia, including:

- Art Gallery of South Australia
- Art Gallery of New South Wales
- National Gallery of Australia
- National Portrait Gallery, Canberra

== Selected works ==
The following is a partial list of the Flugelman's completed works.

Year	Work	Location	Image
1962	high relief sand panels cast in concrete	A.O.R., Kurnell, New South Wales	
1965	untitled six figure group, cast bronze, commissioned 1964	Goldstein courtyard, University of New South Wales, Kensington, New South Wales	
1966–1967	untitled, copper sheeted upright set on mosaic tile basin	Bruce Hall, Australian National University, Canberra	Bert Flugelman 1967, Untitled, copper sheeted upright set on mosaic tile basin, Canberra, ACT
1967	NSW Coat of Arms, double-sided in oxidised bronze	State Office Block, Phillip and Bent Streets, Sydney (demolished 1997)	
1973	Continuum, stainless steel sculpture	Garden South of Johnson Building, University of Adelaide, Adelaide	Bert Flugelman 1973, Continuum, stainless steel sculpture, University of Adelaide, North Terrace Campus, Adelaide
1974	Tattooed Lady, painted earthenware sculpture of a naked woman covered with erotic oriental figures	Art Gallery of South Australia	
1974	Tetrahydrons (Festival Sculpture), stainless steel sculpture	Adelaide Festival Centre, plaza	Tetrahydrons
1975	Knot, stainless steel sculpture	Light Square, Adelaide (since 2003), 1975–1995 at Art Gallery of South Australia	Bert Flugelman 1975, Knot, stainless steel sculpture, Light Square, Adelaide
1975	Earthwork, buried aluminium sculpture	Commonwealth Park, Canberra	Bert Flugelman 1975, Earthwork, buried aluminium sculpture, Commonwealth Park, Canberra
1976	Sculpture No. 2 (Vertical Variation), stainless steel sculpture	Adelaide Festival Centre	Bert Flugelman 1976, Sculpture No. 2, stainless steel sculpture, Adelaide Festival Centre, Adelaide
1977	The Spheres, stainless steel sculpture (popularly known as the Mall's Balls, and sometimes Bert's Balls)	Rundle Mall, Adelaide	The Spheres (Mall's Balls)
1978	Spiral and Wave, stainless steel sculpture	Outside Wollongong Art Gallery, Wollongong, New South Wales	Bert Flugelman 1978, Spiral and Wave, stainless steel sculpture, Wollongong Art Gallery, Wollongong
1978	Pyramid Tower (Dobell Memorial), stainless steel sculpture (Silver Shish Kebab)	Spring Street, Sydney (initially at Martin Place, Sydney)	Pyramid Tower (Dobell Memorial or Silver Shish Kebab)
1979	Tumbling Cubes, stainless steel sculpture	Margaret Timpson Town Park, Belconnen, Canberra	Bert Flugelman 1979, Tumbling Cubes, polished stainless steel sculpture, Margaret Timpson Park, Canberra
1982	Cones, stainless steel sculpture, commissioned 1976	Sculpture Garden of the National Gallery of Australia, Canberra	Cones
1984	Sculpture with Cactus, stainless steel sculpture	Penrith Regional Gallery, Emu Plains, New South Wales	Bert Flugelman 1984, Sculpture with Cactus, stainless steel, Penrith, NSW
1985	Gateway to Mount Keira, stainless steel sculpture	University of Wollongong, Wollongong, New South Wales	Bert Flugelman 1985, Gateway to Mount Keira, stainless steel sculpture, University of Wollongong, Wollongong, New South Wales
1987	Transition Series, stainless steel sculptures on eucalypt base	Library, University of Wollongong, Wollongong, New South Wales (4 of 14 sculptures in series on display)	Bert Flugelman 1987, Transition Series, stainless steel sculpture on eucalypt base, University of Wollongong Library, Wollongong, New South Wales
1988	Winged Figure, stainless steel sculpture (Lawrence Hargrave Memorial)	University of Wollongong, Wollongong, New South Wales	Winged Figure (Lawrence Hargrave Memorial)
1988	three sculptures	Melbourne Hotel Development	
1995/1996	stainless steel, granite, bronze, sandstone sculpture	private collection	
1997	Making Waves, stainless steel sculpture	Kiama, New South Wales (installed 2016)	Bert Flugelman 1997, Making Waves, stainless steel, Kiama, New South Wales
1999/2000	Federation Arch, stainless steel sculpture	Orange Botanical Gardens, Orange, New South Wales	
2000	Conversation (maquette for 2007 sculpture) stainless steel and black granite	Private collection, Canberra	
2004/2005	Caryatid minotaur, stainless steel sculpture		
2005	Tribute, sculpture honouring Richard Llewellyn, stainless steel and black granite	Adelaide Festival Centre, Adelaide	Bert Flugelman 2005, Tribute, black granite and stainless steel sculpture, Adelaide Festival Centre, Adelaide
2005	Tetrapus, stainless steel sculpture	University of Wollongong Innovation Campus, North Wollongong, New South Wales (originally displayed at 2007 "Sculpture by the Sea", Bondi, New South Wales)	Bert Flugelman 2005, Tetrapus, stainless steel, University of Wollongong Innovation Campus, North Wollongong, New South Wales
2006	Slow Spiral, stainless steel sculpture, installed 2007	Queens Plaza, Brisbane	
2007	Conversation, stainless steel sculpture	Pt. Leo Sculpture Park, Point Leo, Victoria	Bert Flugelman 2007, Conversation, stainless steel, Point Leo, Victoria
2007	Opposing Arches (The Arches), stainless steel sculpture	Macquarie University, Sydney	Opposing Arches (The Arches) (2007), stainless steel sculpture, Macquarie University, Sydney
2009	Serpent II, stainless steel sculpture	Pt. Leo Sculpture Park, Point Leo, Victoria (originally displayed at 28 Freshwater Place, Melbourne)	Bert Flugelman 2009, Serpent II, stainless steel, Point Leo, Victoria
2009	Stainless steel sculpture	Corbett Plaza, Bong Bong Street, Bowral NSW	
2011	Ammonite, corten steel sculpture	University of Wollongong Innovation Campus, North Wollongong, New South Wales (originally displayed at 2011 "Sculpture by the Sea", Bondi, New South Wales)	Bert Flugelman 2011, Ammonite, corten steel, University of Wollongong Innovation Campus, North Wollongong, New South Wales
