= International House, The University of Sydney =

Residential college of the University of Sydney, Australia

Coordinates: 33.8883°S 151.1928°E

International House University of Sydney
- University of Sydney
- Location: 96 City Road, Darlington NSW 2008
- Established: 1967
- Architect: Bunning and Madden
- Status: Suspended all Operations
- Colours: Red, Yellow & Blue
- Gender: Mixed
- Residents: 200
- Website: www.sydney.edu.au/international-house/

International House was a hall of residence owned and operated by the University of Sydney. Opened in 1967, the college comprised 200 undergraduate and postgraduate students from Australia and many other countries around the world. The more numerous groups by nationality were Australia, India, China, New Zealand, Hong Kong, and South Korea, and the countries of south-east Asia.

Due to poor commercial viability as a result of the residence being too small for what is required to keep residence fees at a competitive level and the rising costs of maintaining a building with serious issues, the college suspended all operations in January 2021 until a building redevelopment can be completed however this has since stalled due to the University having multiple competing requirements for major investment and hence the redevelopment project is pending decisions on financing.

== History ==
In 1954 the Secretary of the Overseas Student Bureau, Margaret Briggs, prepared a report on the need for an International House. In 1955 the SRC (Students Representative Council) agreed to take on the responsibility for the fundraising campaign for an IH. It was hoped that an International House would assist both Australian and overseas students with quality accommodation and an academic environment for cultural exchange. In 1959 the university appointed Mr W Harold Maze MBE, then deputy principal of the university, to the planning committee and he worked tirelessly to establish the House. His contribution was recognised in the W. H. Maze Building in 1985.

It was the involvement of Rotary International that made International House a possibility. They were tasked with raising $100,000 for the Sydney IH. From as early as 1956 Rotary had expressed a commitment to assisting in the establishment of a residential hall for foreign students.

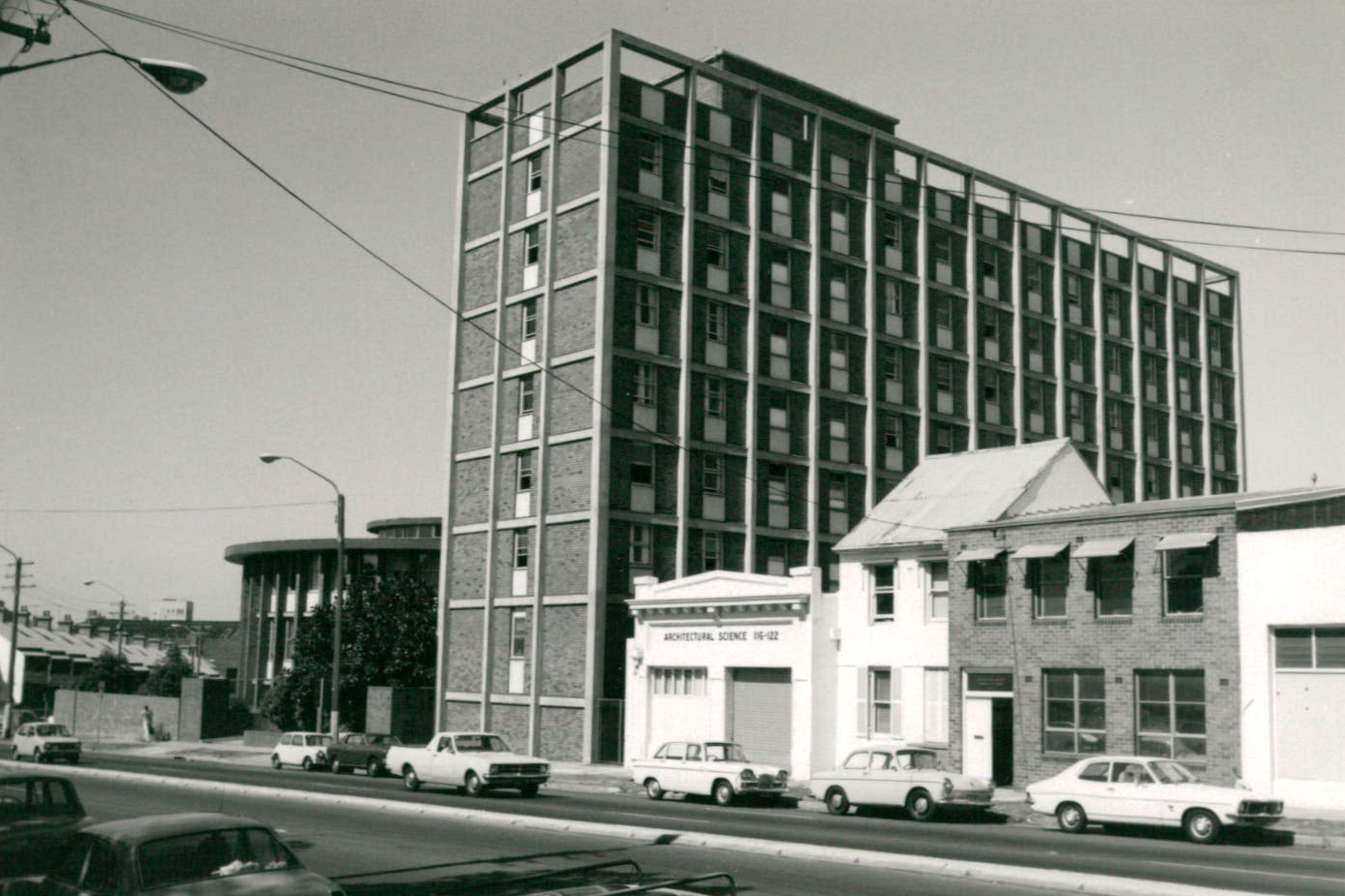
International House and the adjacent former Architectural Science buildings. c. 1970

Fundraising proved to be hard going but Ian Hudson, who was district governor at the time, urged the clubs in his district and the newly emerged District 268 to finish the task. Rotary's fundraising role was vital to the establishment of International House and individual rotaries and particular clubs have continued to assist in relation to matters of governance through their membership of the council as well as through fundraising and outreach programs.

The official opening of the House's main building was on 16 June 1967. Upon opening, the building had the capacity to house 125 residents. Other buildings followed with the East Wing in 1972, Elkin Wing in 1979 and the Maze Units in 1985. The architect for the building was Walter Bunning from the firm, Bunning and Madden, who also designed the National Library of Australia.

The first director, Graeme de Graaff, retired in 1987 and was succeeded by Geoffrey Andrews, who held the position until his retirement in May 1999. The third director was Dr Ruth Shatford, who retired in June 2002. The current director is Jessica Carroll.

== Building Residence ==
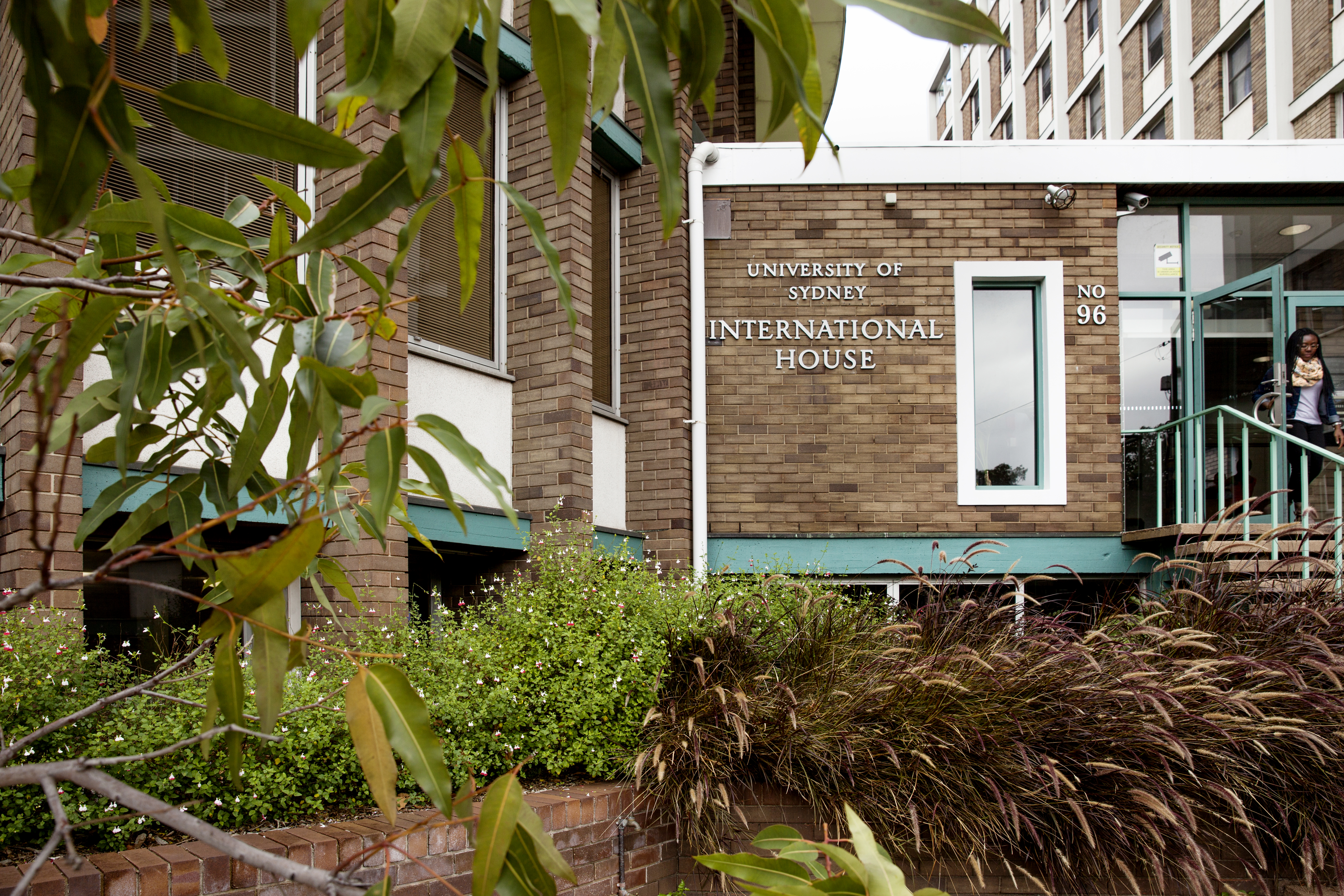
International House, view from City Road

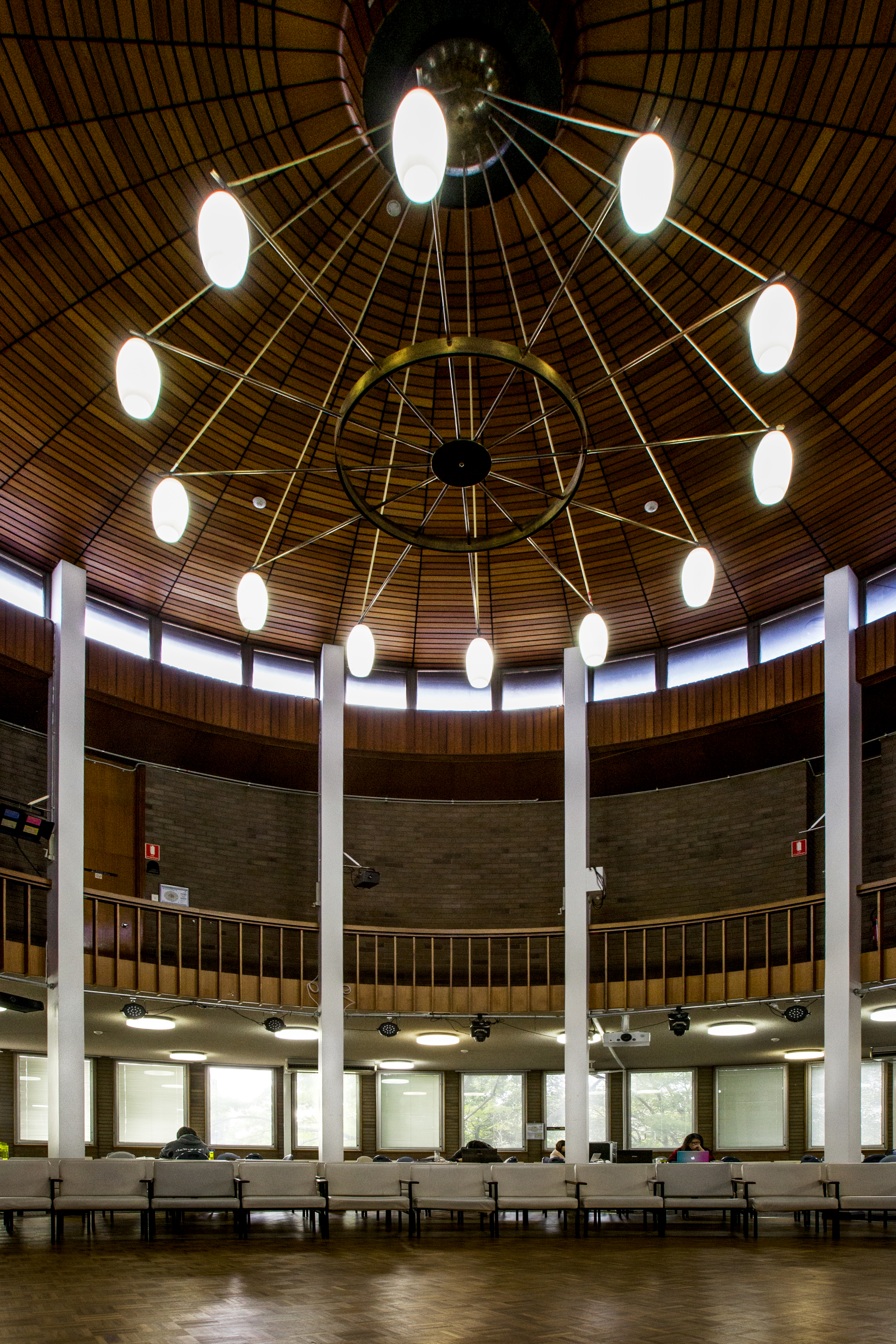
The Wool Room, International House

Since 1967 over 6,000 residents have lived in the House, representing over 100 nationalities. Approximately 40% of residents have come from Australia, 45% have been undergraduates, 40%+ have been women and the average age of residents has been in the mid-twenties.

The House offers both catered and self-catered accommodation to current University of Sydney students. The catered accommodation includes 16 twin share rooms, 145 single rooms and 10 ensuite rooms. The self-catered accommodation includes six studio units, seven one-bedroom units and three two-bedroom units.

One of the central aims of International House is to encourage mutual respect and understanding among residents and wider communities, and to develop authentic international perspectives, far-reaching global networks, and lifelong friendships.

== Governance ==
The council is the governing body of International House. It consists of 4 ex-officio members, 1 Fellow of Senate, 3 members of Rotary International, 1 person from Sydney University International House Alumni Association, 3 members from the International House Members Association and up to 9 appointed members. The ex-officio members are: the chancellor, the deputy chancellor, the vice-chancellor & principal of the university and the director of International House. The council has four committees: Finance, Nominations, Development and Fellows Committee.

=== Current Council composition ===
- Steve Mark AM, Council Chairman – SAB QLD, Hon Doctor of Laws Macq; Creative Consequences P/L; former Legal Services Commissioner of NSW
- Belinda Hutchinson AM – Chancellor
- Dr Michael Spence – Vice Chancellor and Principal
- Alec Brennan AM – Deputy Chancellor
- Jessica Carroll – Director

=== Members' association ===
International House Members' Association (IHMA) is a volunteer committee of current residents who manage social events and activities including I-Night and Food Fair. The Chair, Treasurer and Secretary of IHMA sit on International House Council meetings and are elected each year by current residents. Additional volunteer positions on IHMA include photographer, shop coordinator, food coordinator, social coordinator, environment officer and sports coordinator.

=== Alumni association ===
Sydney University Alumni Association (SUIHAA) is the representative body for 6000+ International House alumni around the world. SUIHAA manage local and international reunions, events, and programs which contribute to the wider mission of International House. The current president of the alumni association is Rosamond Madden AM.

== Notable alumni and College Fellows ==
- Noël Bakhtian, Director, Centre for Advanced Energy Studies at Idaho National Laboratory
- Harald Bergsteiner, author and leadership researcher
- Dennis Cowdroy, barrister of the Federal Court of Australia
- Lauris Elms, opera singer
- Winsome Evans, musician
- Sir Nathaniel Bernard Freeman, film distributor
- John Gascoigne, author, historian and academic
- Lyn Woodger Grant, artist
- Ian George Hudson, timber business developer and Hon. Consul-General, Thailand
- Michael Hwang SC, barrister and arbitrator, Singapore
- Daphne Kok, magistrate
- Nuli Lemoh, paediatrician
- Allan Moss, former CEO Macquarie Group Ltd.
- Hon. Dr Kay Patterson AO, politician, academic
- Gillian Polack, writer and editor
- Vaughan Pratt, computer science researcher
- Joan Rowlands, medical practitioner and author
- Ruth Shatford, high school principal
- Nicholas Stuart, author, journalist and political commentator
- Keith Suter, broadcaster
- Roseanne Taylor, Dean of University of Sydney Faculty of Veterinary Science
- Martin Williams, film producer
- Richard Wilson, former trade commissioner
- Sir Harold Stanley Wyndham, Director-General of Education, NSW
