= Graham Tuckwell =

Australian businessman and philanthropist

Graham Tuckwell AO
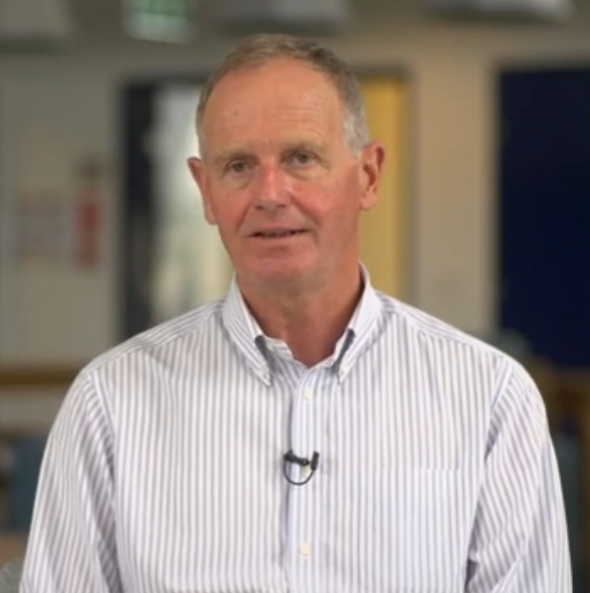
- In an ANU video in 2019
- Born: Canberra, Australia
- Education: Australian National University
- Occupations: Businessman and philanthropist
- Known for: Fund manager
- Spouse: Louise Tuckwell
- Children: 4

Graham Tuckwell AO is an Australian businessman and philanthropist.

== Background and early career ==
Graham John Tuckwell was born in Canberra. He lived at Bruce Hall at the Australian National University, where he graduated as a Bachelor of Economics in 1978 and a Bachelor of Laws in 1981.

He started his career as an advisor to Vince FitzGerald in the Department of the Prime Minister.

== Financial services career ==
He later founded Investor Resources Limited, and served as Head of Mining for the Asia-Pacific region for Salomon Brothers and as executive director of Normandy Mining. He also worked as an investment advisor to Credit Suisse First Boston and Schroders, both in London and Australia.

He is the founder and chairman of ETF Securities, an investment firm focused on exchange-traded funds (ETFs), exchange-traded commodities and exchange-traded currencies. It holds A$30 billion in assets and it is the seventh largest ETP in the world. In 2003, he also started Gold Bullion Securities, an ETP linked to the value of gold as a commodity.

Tuckwell is also the founder and Chairman of the venture capital firm ETFS Capital, and sits on the board as chairman of ETF Shares. The firm has invested in companies including cryptocurrency ETF issuer 21Shares. In 2021, ETFS Capital acquired etf.com.

== Personal life ==
Tuckwell is married to Louise (Wright) Tuckwell, a philanthropist, they have four children, and they reside in Melbourne. Tuckwell's net worth was assessed at A$683 million on the Financial Review 2019 Rich List. Tuckwell's net worth did not meet the A$472 million cut-off for the Financial Review 2020 Rich List.

=== Philanthropy ===
In 2012, he co-founded the Tuckwell Foundation with Louise and in 2013 donated A$50 million to the Australian National University, subsequently increased to A$100 million as at 12 July 2016. As part of the program he endowed, students are selected to become "Tuckwell Scholars" each year, receive a stipend of $24,700. The program is overseen by "Tuckwell Fellows."

The Tuckwell Foundation has also donated to the Education Building Fund and St Columb's Anglican Church Hall in Hawthorn, Victoria.

== Recognition ==
Tuckwell was appointed an Officer of the Order of Australia in the 2022 Australia Day Honours for "distinguished service to the community through philanthropic support of education scholarships, and to business".
