= Bunning and Madden =

Australian architecture and urban planning firm

Practice information
- Key architects: Walter Bunning CMG; Charles Madden; Kevin Smith; Noel Potter AO; Arthur Robb
- Founders: Walter Bunning; Charles Madden (1946-60)
- Founded: 19 May 1945

Significant works and honors
- Buildings: Liner House (1960); National Library of Australia (1968)
- Awards: RIBA Bronze Medal (1958); Sir John Sulman Medal (1962); The C.S. Daley Award (1969)

Bunning and Madden is an Australian architecture and urban planning firm based in Canberra and Sydney. The firm was founded by Walter Bunning in 1945 in Sydney. The firm's most notable commission was the design of the National Library of Australia and the firm was most prominent between 1955 and 1970s.

== Background ==
Walter Bunning was born on 19 May 1912 in South Brisbane. Bunning studied art at East Sydney Technical College. He attending Sydney Technical College at night and worked in the offices of Carlyle Greenwell and Stephenson & Meldrum. Bunning won the Kemp medal on qualifying in 1933 and became an associate of the college in 1936. He was awarded a Board of Architects Travelling Scholar (NSW) to study urban planning aboard during 1936–39. Bunning became an associate of the Royal Institute of British Architects in 1938 was awarded the Australian Medallion in 1939. Bunning returned to Sydney and was elected an associate of the Royal Australian Institute of Architects in 1940; and later Councillor of the New South Wales chapter, 1940–44 and Fellow in 1951). In 1945 he was appointed town planner under a Commonwealth scheme to redevelop the munitions plant at St Marys as factories. And also elaborated his view in Homes in the Sun. According to Robin Boyd, the book established Bunning as 'the best known architectural publicist in the country.

=== Foundation of the firm ===
Bunning's firm was founded by him on 19 May 1945 in an office on the first floor of 15 York Street, Sydney. In the first year the practice produced many houses and number of town planning schemes. Bunning invited Charles Madden to join him and the partnership of Bunning and Madden was founded on 29 May 1946. Bunning and Madden won the Australia and New Zealand-wide competition to design Anzac House, the New South Wales official memorial for returned servicemen and women in WWI and WWII. In 1953 the firm was commissioned by Grace Bros. Limited to design a large suburban store at Parramatta. It was the first store in Australia with roof-top carpark.

Kevin Smith and Noel Potter were on the staff of the firm for some years and become Associates in 1955 and 1957. On 16 July 1960, Madden died and Bunning took Smith and Potter into the partnership and Arthur Robb became an Associate of the firm. In 1961 the firm was commissioned to design the National Library of Australia by the National Capital Development Commission, Potter was the project architect on the National Library and finally opened Bunning and Madden's permanent office in Civic in 1964, and remained the firm's partner in charge in Canberra until retiring in 1996. The firm completed International House for the University of Sydney in 1967. Robb joined the partnership on 1 July 1969. Bunning and Madden architects also work for the National Headquarters of The Institution of Engineers, Australia and Australian National University projects. Over many years the firm has carried out a large volume of work for the Department of Public Works in New South Wales and Housing Commission of New South Wales. Bunning was appointed Commander of the Order of St Michael and St George in 1975 and a Life Fellow of the Royal Australian Planning Institute in 1976. He died of a cerebral tumour on 13 October 1977.

In 2006 Potter was awarded Clem Cummings Award by the Australian Institute of Architects, and in 2010 he was appointed an Officer of the Order of Australia for exceptional services to architecture.

== Notable projects ==
Buildings designed either in part or in full by the firm, Bunning and Madden
Building name	Image	Location	Year completed	Award(s)	Heritage register(s)	Notes
Anzac House		Martin Place, Sydney CBD	1956	RIBA Bronze Medal (1958)		
Grace Bros, Parramatta		Parramatta, Sydney				
ANSTO Nuclear Science Buildings (decommissioned 2007)		Lucas Heights, Sydney	1960			
Liner House		13-15 Bridge Street, Sydney CBD	1960	Sir John Sulman Medal (1962)	NSW State Heritage Register	
International House, The University of Sydney		Camperdown, Sydney	1967			
Bruce Hall, Australian National University (partially demolished in 2017)		Acton, Canberra	1961		Partial nomination for the Commonwealth Heritage List	
National Library of Australia		Parkes, Canberra	1968		Commonwealth Heritage List (2004)	
Indian High Commission and Birch House		Yarralumla, Canberra	1969	The C.S. Daley Award (1969)		

== See also ==
- Architecture of Australia
