= St Columb's Anglican Church =

- St Columb's Anglican Church
- 37°49′26″S 145°02′23″E
- Location: 5 St Columbs Street, Hawthorn, Victoria
- Country: Australia
- Denomination: Anglican
- Website: stcolumbs.org.au

History
- Dedicated: 1889

Architecture
- Architect(s): George Wharton; H.W. & F.B. Tompkins
- Style: Decorated Gothic architecture
- Completed: 1907

Clergy
- Vicar: Rev. Mark McDonald

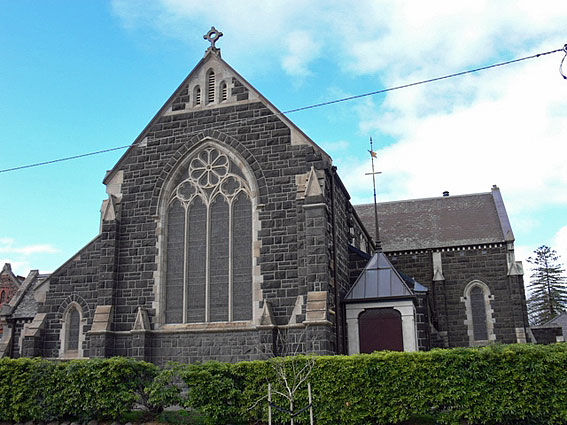
St Columb's Anglican Church at St Columb's Street, Hawthorn

St Columb's Anglican Church is an Anglican church in Hawthorn, Victoria, a suburb of Melbourne in Australia.

== Location ==
The church is located on the corner of Burwood Road and St Columbs Street. The exact address is 5 St Columb's Street.

== History ==
The church is named after St Columb's Cathedral in Derry, Northern Ireland, in honour of Saint Columba (521–597), an Irish abbot and missionary who spread Christianity to Scotland.

The church was founded in 1879 as a chapel of ease for Christ Church, another church in Hawthorn. The main building was designed by George Wharton in the Decorated Gothic architectural style in 1882–1883. It was built by James Anderson in the 1880s, using bluestone and freestone dressings. The first sermon took place in 1883. However, the entire church building was only completed in 1907, to the designs of architects H.W. & F.B. Tompkins. Other buildings include the Large Hall on Burwood Road, which used to act as a Sunday School and the 'chapel' for the Sunday 6 pm service and other uses, and the Small Hall, a former nursery school which is now used for Sunday 10 am kids' church, Thursday playgroup and other uses such as choir and dance lessens.

The stained glass was designed by William Montgomery, Alan Sumner and others. The original pipe organ, built by William Stone of St Kilda, Victoria, was sold to St Andrew's Presbyterian Church in Murwillumbah, New South Wales, in 1923. The current pipe organ, built by Roberts Ltd of Melbourne and Adelaide, has been in this church since 1923. It is listed by the National Trust of Australia.

In 2007, the pews were replaced with padded seats. Since 2012, the church has received donations from Louise and Graham Tuckwell of the Tuckwell Foundation.

The current vicar is Rev. Mark McDonald.

St Columb's Anglican Church currently has two Sunday worship services: 10 am in the church and 6 pm "Live @ the Chapel" in the café.
