= Jodi McAlister =

Australian author

- Born: New South Wales, Australia
- Occupations: Author, academic
- Employer: Deakin University
- Writing career
- Genres: Young adult fiction, romance
- Website: jodimcalister.com.au

Jodi McAlister is an Australian author and academic. She has published numerous books, including contemporary romance and young adult fiction and academic works regarding romance and literature.

== Biography ==
McAlister was born in New South Wales, Australia. She has a PhD in representations of love in popular culture and fiction. She is a senior lecturer at Deakin University. McAlister is the vice-president of the International Association for the Study of Popular Romance. She is a regular commentator on popular culture, romance fiction, and reality television. Her novel Not Here to Make Friends was named one of the Best Romance Novels of 2024 by New York Times columnist Olivia Waite.

== Works ==
=== Novels ===
Love Notes

- McAlister, Jodi (2025). An Academic Affair. Melbourne, Vic. ISBN 978-0-14-357416-3. OCLC 1545799991.

==== Valentine Series ====
- McAlister, Jodi (2017). Valentine. Melbourne, Vic. ISBN 978-0-14-357416-3. OCLC 956920514.
- McAlister, Jodi (2018). Ironheart. North Sydney, N.S.W. ISBN 978-0-14-357417-0. OCLC 1002109274.
- Jodi McAlister (2019). Misrule. Melbourne, VIC. ISBN 978-0-14-379346-5. OCLC 1056952408.

==== Marry Me, Juliet Series ====
- McAlister, Jodi (2022). Here for the Right Reasons. Cammeray, NSW. ISBN 978-1-76110-496-1. OCLC 1319427255.
- McAlister, Jodi (2023) Can I Steal You For A Second? ISBN 978-1761104992
- McAlister, Jodi (2024) Not Here to Make Friends ISBN 978-1-76110-934-8.

==== Others ====
- McAlister, Jodi (2022). Libby Lawrence is good at pretending (1 ed.). Mile End, SA. ISBN 978-1-74305-904-3. OCLC 1306533383.

=== Academic works ===
- McAlister, Jodi (2020). The consummate virgin : female virginity loss and love in anglophone popular literatures. Cham, Switzerland. ISBN 978-3-030-55004-2. OCLC 1191246857.
- McAlister, Jodi (2021). New adult fiction. Cambridge, United Kingdom. ISBN 978-1-108-90073-7. OCLC 1281684649.
- McAlister, Jodi, Parnell, Claire, and Trinidad, Andrea Anne (2023). Publishing Romance Fiction in the Philippines Cambridge, United Kingdom. ISBN 9781009092289
