= Liner House =

Heritage-listed building in Sydney, Australia

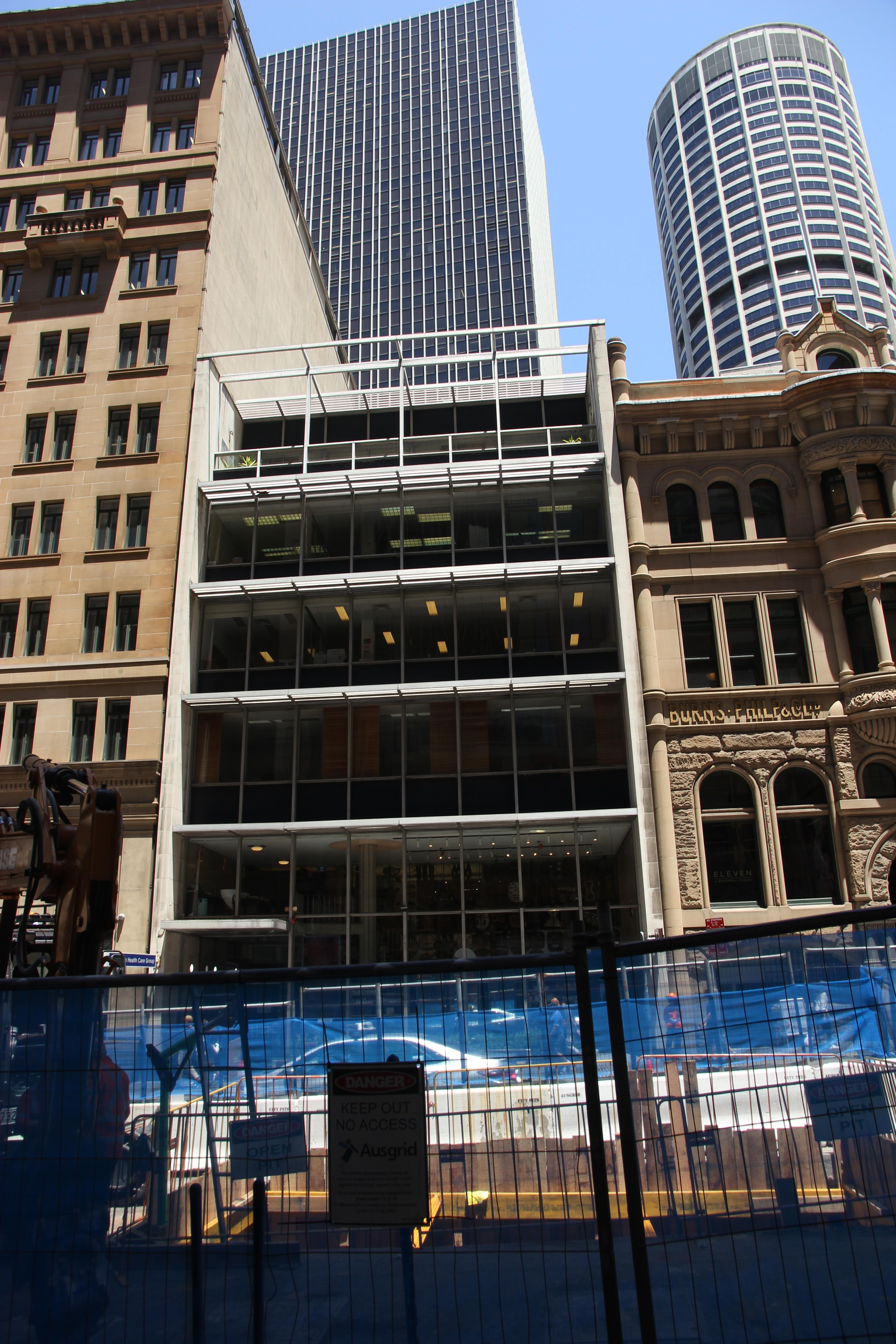
- Liner House, pictured centre in 2019, through roadworks

- Location within Sydney Location within Australia
- 33.8639°S 151.2083°E
- Location: 13–15 Bridge Street, Sydney central business district, City of Sydney, New South Wales, Australia

History
- Built: 1959–1960
- Built for: Wilh. Wilhelmsen Agency Pty. Ltd.

Site notes
- Architect: Bunning and Madden
- Architectural style: International

New South Wales Heritage Register
- Official name: Liner House; Moran Art Gallery
- Type: State heritage (built)
- Designated: 2 April 1999
- Reference no.: 589
- Type: Commercial Office/Building
- Category: Commercial

Liner House is a heritage-listed office building located at 13–15 Bridge Street, in the Sydney central business district, in the City of Sydney local government area of New South Wales, Australia. It was designed by Bunning and Madden and built from 1959 to 1960. It is also known as Moran House. It houses a restaurant and the Moran Arts Foundation on its lower floors. It was added to the New South Wales State Heritage Register on 2 April 1999. The building was awarded the Sir John Sulman Medal in 1961.

== History ==
The subject building is located on part of the former Government Lumber Yard, established on the south-west side of the "Bridgeway" (Bridge Street) over the Tank Stream and east of "High Street" (George Street). Use of the yard ceased in 1832 and the area was subdivided and sold off. In doing so the Government increased the width of Bridge Street and created Bridge Lane.

A public auction of the land was undertaken in February 1834 (apparently without initial success) and again in June 1835. The subject building is located on Lots 5 & 6 of the Lumber Yard Auction (City Section No.46). Comprising a combined area of fourteen and a one quarter perches two titles were separately issues to Joseph Barrow Montefiore in July 1835. Montefiore's interest in the property was short lived, the title being subsequently sold to Samuel Lyons in January 1836. Lyons in turn sold the title in May 1836 to John Terry Hughes.

It seems that after purchasing the titles of the adjoining Lots 3 to 4 (west of the subject site running to Hamilton Street) Hughes developed the site by building a group of four single-storey brick-built hipped-roofed buildings fronted by a stone colonnade. The complex was used primarily as shops and was known for a period as "Pauls Row".

In July 1840 Hughes mortgaged the property to the value of £6,000 to Thomas Moore. By this means, as a default in the mortgage, Moore acquired ownership. Moore died in December 1840 and as with the bulk of his estate, the property was bequeathed to the Church of England. It seems probable that the site was redeveloped again in the mid-1850s with the building of a one-storey structure. The property remained in church ownership through a succession of trustees until November 1938 when it was purchased by Burns Philp Trust Ltd.

In c. 1878 an addition of two stories was built. This building was later described as comprising a basement, ground and two upper floors. The wall materials were brick and stone, with timber floors and timber framed roof. By the 1910s through to the 1930s, No. 13 Bridge Street was leased by the well known sanitary engineers, Tylor & Sons Pty Ltd. No. 15 Bridge Street was leased by Smith and Lane, printers and stationers. Towards the end of this period the premises at No. 13 Bridge Street were known as "Roylt Chambers".

At the time the title of the property was converted to Torrens title, the owner purchased a strip of land fronting Bridge Lane, probably contemporary with the purchase of the property by Burns Philp Trust Ltd. In November 1938 the tenants of the buildings changed. By the commencement of the 1940s No. 13 Bridge Street was leased by the Leyton Lantern Cafe, and No. 15 Bridge Street by Norton & Huband-Smith Pty Ltd, auctioneers and valuators.

The property was purchased by Qantas Empire Airways Ltd. in October 1945. At about this time the buildings were converted for use as the Qantas Cargo Terminal. This use continued until December 1957. The property was purchased by Wilh. Wilhelmsen Agency Pty. Ltd. in early 1958.

The nineteenth century building was demolished in mid-1959. The new building was designed by Bunning and Madden architects for the Wilh. Wilhelmsen Agency Pty. Ltd. Wilhelmsen at this time occupied an office opposite the site. The design for the new building was completed during early 1959 and construction commenced in late 1959. Construction time was about 49 weeks.

The Wilhelmsen Agency was founded as the Wilh. Wilhelmsen Line in 1861 at Tonsberg, then the premier port of Norway. The Wilhelmsen Agency was established in Australia in 1918 at the request of the Wilhelmsen Line as the Norwegian Australia Line Agency Ltd. The first office in Australia was at 36 Pitt Street. The following year the agency moved to 89 Pitt Street. In 1926 the name was changed to Wilh Wilhelmsen Agency Pty Ltd. In 1936 the agency moved to the old Phoenix House in Hunter Street. The Agency then occupied the first three floors of the Bridge Street premises in 1960. At the time of opening of Liner House, the Wilhelmsen Line was Norway's largest shipping organisation. Within two decades following World War II the number of Wilhelmsen sailings had increased twofold from 18 in 1946–47 to 30 in 1959–60.

The building utilised the maximum floor area provided by the site (14 metres (45 ft) wide and 27 metres (90 ft) deep), but did not exploit the potential height maximum. The design philosophy being "to build a house for their (Wilh. Wilhelmsen) own use rather than construct a tall narrow building to exploit the site for its maximum financial return". In 1961 the building won the Sir John Sulman Medal for the most meritorious building constructed in New South Wales for 1961 in recognition of its "consistent honesty in design and good taste for this building" and 'very good manners to (its) neighbours, indicating a strong civic consciousness.'

The property was purchased for $5.8 million by Clute Holdings Pty Ltd in February 1986. Prior to this an Interim Conservation Order (ICO) (No. 391) had been gazetted by the Heritage Council of NSW in April 1985. This action complicated matters for the new owner when a lease was made to James Richardson Pty Ltd for the whole of the ground and mezzanine floors from June 1986 for the use as a duty free retail outlet and office and store. The Heritage Council received a Section 60 application from Clute Holdings Pty Ltd in May 1986 for the removal of the Annand Screen. James Richardson Pty Ltd at about the same time made a Section 60 application for the alteration to the front doors. The front door alteration was approved in August 1986.

The Clute Holdings application was withdrawn but the screen and stairs were subsequently blocked out and a neon sign erected on the stairs. The Heritage Council subsequently sought to have these alterations removed and charged the architects Richard Mann and Associates and lessees James Richardson Pty Ltd with offences under Section 57(1) of the Heritage Act 1977. Following the expiration of the ICO No. 391 in May 1987 a new ICO (No. 737) was gazetted. In April 1988 a further ICO (No. 845) was gazetted and notice given of a proposal to make a Permanent Conservation Order (PCO) for the building. This was the first time a modern era premises was subject to a Permanent Conservation Order. James Richardson Pty Ltd who continued as the lessee at the time objected to the making of the PCO under Section 41 of the Heritage Act of 1977 in that it would render the premises incapable of "reasonable or economic use".

This issue was addressed at the subsequent Commission Enquiry. The extent of the unauthorised building work was described as:

- a plasterboard on a metal frame partition structure placed in front of the Douglas Annand mural;
- a wooden enclosure around the spiral staircase;
- a neon light attached to the wooden enclosure around the spiral staircase; and
- a glass covered showcase below the spiral staircase.

The Commissioner of Inquiry, William Simpson, found in October 1988 in favour of upholding the making of the PCO. The alterations were subsequently removed.

== Description ==
The building comprises a basement for parking and ground, mezzanine and four upper floors for office accommodation. A further two upper floors were for the installation of the air conditioning plant and other services.

=== Structure and services ===
The building is a steel column frame. The floors are constructed in a reinforced concrete ribbed system with clear spans of 11 metres (35 ft). The building incorporates a curtain wall (set back 1 metre (4 ft) from the building line) of anodised aluminium members with spandrel panels of navy blue coloured ceramic glass. All the glazing (in panels measuring 2 metres (5 ft 6 in) wide by 2 metres (7 ft) high) is fixed except for one sliding panel on each floor to provide access to the exterior surface.

The building was designed in harmony with the streetscape, which was predominantly of masonry construction (i.e. the Burns Philp & Co. Ltd. Building, designed by McCredie and Anderson constructed in dressed and rusticated stone in 1900, and Scottish House, designed by Spain and Cosh in 1926 with a dressed stone facade.) Accordingly, stone facings are applied to the street facing flanking walls and ground floor shipping chamber. The facing stone (English Portland) was selected to complement both the stone of the adjoining buildings and the stone for internal fitting (Perricot stone).

The strong horizontal emphasis of the adjoining buildings is complemented by the use of 1 metre (4 ft) deep louvered sun hoods and the use of a generous proportion of "Georgian character" in the panel subdivisions of the curtain wall. The deep sun hood allowed for a reduction in the load of air conditioning system by projecting the north facing windows from the summer sun.

Four separate air conditioning plants were installed to accommodate the wide variation in the usage of different sections of the building. The main plant was installed in the basement and serviced the general office spaces. The Board Room, Staff Luncheon Room and Caretaker's flat located on the fourth floor each had a separate plant.

All office spaces were provided with a grid system of floor outlet boxes for power and telephone outlets. Artificial lightings was provided by flush mounted fluorescent fittings. Special inacadescent bracket fittings were provided for the main entrance and lobby and an incandescent chandelier was installed in the Board Room.

The fully automatic lift was installed which provided a capacity of 26 persons at a run of 300' per minute. A PABX system and teleprinter was installed to satisfy the owner's extensive electronic communication requirements. A pneumatic tube system was also installed for the delivery of material between departments.

=== Internal finishes ===
Generally most of the office floor ceilings were fitted with Malley's Ltd. perforated metal acoustic panels to provide for flexibility in lighting and air conditioning arrangements. Most of the floors were fitted with vinyl tiles in the corridor spaces, and linoleum to the office spaces. Exceptions were the ground floor Shipping Chamber which was floored with a checker board pattern of scag-terazzo and the Directors' Suite and Board Room fitted with Tasmanian Oak parquetry. The walls were generally rendered and painted except throughout the ground and mezzanine floors where panelling of Thailand teak was installed. The Directors Suite and Board Room were panelled in English Beech with insert moulded beads of Tasmanina Oak.

Prominent in the design of the Shipping Chamber are the mural screen and spiral staircase. The mural screen was designed by sculptor Douglas Annand and manufactured and executed by Z. Vesley's Metal Products of Marrickville. Measuring 10 by 3 metres (32 by 11 ft) it forms the side wall to the former Passage Department located on the mezzanine floor. Supported by a structural metal framework hung from the floor above, it incorporates 160 different shapes in the materials of brass, copper, aluminium and stainless steel. Variety in the shapes is achieved by use of concave, convex, perforated, non-perforated and beaten patterns.

The spiral staircase turns 360 degrees in a height of 4 metres (12 ft 6 in). It is constructed of terrazzo-filled steel tread pans carried off two bracket supported structural steel carriage pieces.

=== Modifications and dates ===
- late 1959 – construction commenced
- 1960 – construction completed
- 1965 – relocation and installation of PABX room to fifth floor
- 1967 – partitioning to second and third floors
- 1969 – partitioning to the ground and mezzanine
- 1970 – partitioning from the mezanine, first to third floors
- 1981 – partitioning to the first floor
- 1984 – conversion of fourth floor Caretakers flat to office space and partitioning

== Heritage listing ==
Liner House is associated with the Wilh. Wilhelmson Agency and the historic use of Bridge Street as the hub of offices/agencies associated with shipping. It was constructed at the close of the 1950s – an era of unprecedented commercial building activity in central Sydney. Liner House is an outstanding and relatively intact example of an International style, curtain walled office building, distinguished particularly by the quality and consistency of its design, the fineness of its finishes and its sensitivity to its contemporary neighbours and streetscape.

Liner House was listed on the New South Wales State Heritage Register on 2 April 1999 having satisfied the following criteria.

The place is important in demonstrating the course, or pattern, of cultural or natural history in New South Wales.

Liner House is associated with the Wilh. Wilhelmson Agency and the historic use of Bridge Street as the hub of offices/agencies associated with shipping. It was constructed at the close of the 1950s - an era of unprecedented commercial building activity in central Sydney. It is a building designed by the notable post second world war architectural practice of Bunning and Madden.

The place is important in demonstrating aesthetic characteristics and/or a high degree of creative or technical achievement in New South Wales.

Liner House incorporates curtain wall construction, a relatively short lived design feature popular in the late 1950s. Liner House incorporates a number of interior design and material details which are typical of a late 1950s curtain wall building. Liner House makes a substantial contribution to the streetscape of Bridge Street that retains extant examples of late 1950s architectural detailing such as light fittings, the circular staircase, wall finishes, Boardroom fittings and panelling. Liner House retains the Douglas Annand screen, considered by the Society of Sculptors as 'a considerable artistic advance in commercial building and public sculpture.'

The place has a strong or special association with a particular community or cultural group in New South Wales for social, cultural or spiritual reasons.

The social value of Liner House is demonstrated through an ongoing recognition of the building's aesthetic and historic value at the time the building was constructed through the awarding of the Sulman Medal, and more recently through legislative powers aimed at protecting the cultural heritage.

The place has potential to yield information that will contribute to an understanding of the cultural or natural history of New South Wales.

The place is associated with a documented European occupation from the earliest years of the settlement of Australia.

The place possesses uncommon, rare or endangered aspects of the cultural or natural history of New South Wales.

Liner House is the only extant work of Bunning and Madden in the Sydney CBD in the International style.

== See also ==
- Sir John Sulman Medal
- Australian non-residential architectural styles
