= Forbes list of Australia's 50 richest people 2016 =

The Forbes list of Australia's 50 richest people is the annual survey of the fifty wealthiest people resident in Australia, published by Forbes Asia in January 2016.

The net worth of the wealthiest individual, Blair Parry-Okeden, was estimated to be US$8.80 billion. It was the first and only time that Parry-Okeden appeared on the Forbes Australian list. She is a US-citizen and, despite living in Australia, is not eligible for admission on the list.

== List of individuals ==
2016		Name	Citizenship	Source of wealth	2015	
Rank	Net worth US$ bn	Name	Citizenship	Source of wealth	Rank	Net worth US$ bn
1 ▲	8.80 ▲	Blair Parry-Okeden	United States	Cox Enterprises heiress	n/a	not listed
2 ▼	8.50 ▼	Gina Rinehart	Australia	Hancock Prospecting; investment	1	11.70 ▼
3 ▼	6.90 ▲	Harry Triguboff	Australia	Meriton	2 ▲	5.60 ▲
4 ▼	5.00	Frank Lowy	Australia	Ex-Westfield; property	3 ▲	5.00 ▲
5 ▲	3.60 ▲	Anthony Pratt	Australia	Visy; Pratt Industries	7 ▼	3.50 ▼
6 ▼	3.50 ▼	James Packer	Australia	Crown Resorts; Consolidated Media Holdings	4 ▼	4.70 ▼
7 ▼	3.20 ▼	John Gandel	Australia	Property (shopping centres)	6 ▲	3.60 ▲
8 ▲	2.80 ▼	Lindsay Fox	Australia	Linfox	9 ▲	2.90 ▲
9 ▲	1.95 ▲	David Teoh	Australia	Telecommunications	17	1.60 ▲
10 ▲	1.90 ▼	David Hains	Australia	Investment	11 ▲	2.10
11 ▼	1.85 ▼	Kerr Neilson	Australia	Financial services	8 ▲	3.00 ▲
12	1.83 ▼	Fiona Geminder	Australia	Manufacturing; investment	12 ▲	2.10 ▲
13 ▲	1.80 ▼	Sir Michael Hintze	Australia; United Kingdom	Retail; investment	15	1.90 ▲
14 ▲	1.78 ▲	Mike Cannon-Brookes	Australia	Atlassian	25 ▲	1.10 ▲
15 ▲	1.75 ▲	Scott Farquhar	Australia	Atlassian	25 ▲	1.10 ▲
16 ▼	1.60 ▼	Alan Wilson and family	Australia	Reece Group; retail	14 ▲	2.00 ▲
17 ▼	1.54 ▼	Stan Perron	Australia	Property	16 ▼	1.60 ▼
18 ▲	1.50 ▲	Jack Cowin	Australia	Competitive Foods Australia; investment	29 ▲	1.00 ▲
19 ▼	1.35 ▲	Gerry Harvey	Australia	Harvey Norman; retail	18 ▲	1.30 ▲
20 ▼	1.30 ▼	Heloise Waislitz	Australia	Manufacturing; investment	13 ▲	2.00 ▲
21 ▲	1.27 ▲	Alan Rydge	Australia	Rydges Hotels & Resorts	22 ▲	1.20 ▲
22 ▼	1.24 ▼	Andrew Forrest	Australia	Fortescue	10 ▼	2.10 ▼
23 ▼	1.20	Bob Ell	Australia	Property development	19 ▲	1.20 ▲
24 ▼	1.10 ▼	Maurice Alter	Australia	Property (shopping centres)	19 ▲	1.20 ▲
25 ▲	1.10 ▲	Russ Withers and Beverley Barlow	Australia	7-Eleven Australia	n/a	not listed
26 ▼	1.02 ▼	Lang Walker	Australia	Walker Corporation (property)	21	1.20 ▲
27 ▼	1.00 ▼	Kerry Stokes	Australia	Property; Seven West Media; resources	23 ▼	1.20 ▼
28 ▼	0.97 ▼	John van Lieshout	Australia	Real estate	27 ▲	1.00 ▲
29 ▲	0.93 ▼	Angela Bennett	Australia	Resources	31 ▼	0.97 ▼
30	0.92 ▼	Solomon Lew	Australia	Premier Investments; retail	30 ▼	0.98 ▼
31 ▲	0.83 ▲	Paul Little	Australia	Logistics; real estate	37	0.82 ▲
32 ▲	0.77 ▲	Tony and Ron Perich	Australia	Investment	39 ▲	0.75 ▲
33 ▼	0.76 ▼	Len Ainsworth	Australia	Gaming; manufacturing	24 ▼	1.20 ▼
34 ▲	0.745 ▼	Bob Ingham	Australia	Poultry; property development	35 ▼	0.90 ▼
35 ▲	0.74 ▼	John Kahlbetzer	Australia	Agriculture	36 ▼	0.83 ▲
36 ▼	0.735 ▲	Sam Tarascio	Australia	Real estate	42 ▲	0.71 ▲
37 ▲	0.72 ▲	Judith Neilson	Australia	Investment	n/a	not listed
38 ▲	0.70 ▲	Con Makris	Australia	Real estate	46 ▼	0.64 ▲
39 ▲	0.675 ▲	Reg Rowe	Australia		n/a	not listed
40 ▲	0.66	Ralph Sarich	Australia	Real estate	44	0.66 ▲
41 ▼	0.65 ▼	Maha Sinnathamby	Australia	Real estate	40 ▲	0.74 ▲
42 ▼	0.645 ▼	Brett Blundy	Australia	Retail; agribusiness	38 ▲	0.77 ▲
43 ▲	0.64 ▲	Bruce Mathieson	Australia	Hotels	48 ▼	0.61 ▼
44 ▲	0.615 ▲	Richard Smith	Australia	Food distribution	45 ▼	0.65 ▼
45 ▲	0.575 ▲	Graham Turner	Australia	Flight Centre; travel services	49 ▼	0.57 ▼
46 ▼	0.57 ▼	Bruce Gordon	Australia	WIN Corporation; investment	41 ▼	0.72 ▲
47 ▲	0.565 ▲	Nigel Austin	Australia	Cotton On Group; retail	n/a	not listed
48 ▼	0.55 ▼	Christopher Morris	Australia	Software; hospitality	47	0.63 ▲
49 ▲	0.51 ▲	Gretel Packer	Australia	Crown Resorts; investment	n/a	not listed
50 ▲	0.50 ▲	Marcus Blackmore	Australia	Blackmores; health supplements	n/a	not listed

Legend
Icon	Description
Steady	Has not changed from the previous year
▲	Has increased from the previous year
▼	Has decreased from the previous year

== See also ==
- Financial Review Rich List
- Forbes list of Australia's 50 richest people
