= Forbes list of Australia's 50 richest people 2019 =

The Forbes list of Australia's 50 richest people is the annual survey of the fifty wealthiest people resident in Australia, published by Forbes Asia on 15 January 2019.

The net worth of the wealthiest individual (number 1 on the list), Gina Rinehart, was estimated to be US$14.80 billion. The net worth of the least-wealthy individual on the list (number 50 on the 50 person list), Michael Heine, was estimated to be US$750 million.

== List of individuals ==
2019		Name	Citizenship	Source of wealth	2018	
Rank	Net worth US$ bn	Name	Citizenship	Source of wealth	Rank	Net worth US$ bn
1	14.80 ▼	Gina Rinehart	Australia	Hancock Prospecting; mining; investment	1	17.40 ▲
2	9.00 ▼	Harry Triguboff	Australia	Meriton		
3	6.80 ▲	Anthony Pratt	Australia	Visy; Pratt Industries; recycling and paper		
4	6.50 ▲	Frank Lowy	Australia	Ex-Westfield; property		
5 ▲	6.40 ▲	Mike Cannon-Brookes	Australia	Atlassian software tech		
5 ▲	6.40 ▲	Scott Farquhar	Australia	Atlassian software tech		
7 ▼	4.30 ▼	Andrew Forrest	Australia	Fortescue, predominantly mining		
8 ▼	4.00 ▼	John Gandel	Australia	Property (shopping centres)		
9 ▼	3.60 ▼	James Packer	Australia	Crown Resorts; Consolidated Media Holdings		
10 ▼	3.50	Lindsay Fox	Australia	Linfox Transports and logistics		
11 ▼	3.10 ▼	Bianca Rinehart, John Hancock, Ginia Rinehart and Hope Welker	Australia	Resources		
12 ▲	2.90 ▼	Kerry Stokes	Australia	Property; Seven West Media; resources		
13 ▲	2.55 ▲	Sir Michael Hintze	Australia; United Kingdom	Retail; investment		
14 ▲	2.50 ▼	Alan Wilson and family	Australia	Reece Group; retail		
15 ▲	2.40 ▲	Lang Walker	Australia	Walker Corporation (property)		
16 ▲	2.30 ▼	Fiona Geminder	Australia	Manufacturing; investment		
17 ▲	2.20 ▲	Richard White	Australia	WiseTech Global		
18 ▲	2.10 ▲	Maurice Alter	Australia	Property (shopping centres)		
19	1.90 ▲	David Hains	Australia	Investment		
20 ▲	1.80 ▲	Clive Palmer	Australia	Mineralogy and other mining interests; hospitality		
21 ▼	1.76 ▲	Heloise Waislitz	Australia	Manufacturing; investment		
22 ▼	1.74 ▲	Tony and Ron Perich	Australia	Investment		
23 ▼	1.70 ▲	Jack Cowin	Australia	Competitive Foods Australia; investment		
24 ▼	1.65 ▼	Angela Bennett	Australia	Resources		
25 ▲	1.62 ▲	David Teoh	Australia	Telecommunications		
26 ▲	1.60 ▲	Gretel Packer	Australia	Crown Resorts; investment		
27 ▲	1.50 ▲	Nigel Austin	Australia	Cotton On Group; retail		
28 ▼	1.46 ▲	Solomon Lew	Australia	Premier Investments; retail		
29 ▲	1.44 ▲	Brett Blundy	Australia	Retail; agribusiness		
30 ▲	1.42 ▲	Bob Ell	Australia	Property development		
31 ▼	1.40 ▲	John van Lieshout	Australia	Real estate		
32 ▼	1.35 ▼	Gerry Harvey	Australia	Harvey Norman; retail		
33 ▼	1.30 ▼	Manny Stul	Australia	Retail; toys		
34 ▼	1.24 ▼	Kerr Neilson	Australia	Financial services		
35 ▲	1.22 ▲	Sam Tarascio	Australia	Real estate		
36 ▲	1.20 ▲	Terry Snow	Australia	Capital Airport Group; property development		
37 ▼	1.02 ▲	Judith Neilson	Australia	Investment		
38 ▼	1.00 ▼	Alan Rydge	Australia	Rydges Hotels & Resorts		
39 ▲	0.98 ▲	Maha Sinnathamby	Australia	Real estate		
40 ▼	0.95 ▲	Paul Little	Australia	Logistics; real estate		
41 ▲	0.91 ▲	Chris Wallin	Australia	Mining		
42 ▼	0.90 ▲	Len Ainsworth	Australia	Gaming; manufacturing		
43	0.87 ▲	Bruce Mathieson	Australia	Hotels		
44 ▼	0.85 ▲	Con Makris	Australia	Real estate		
45 ▼	0.825 ▼	Russ Withers and family of the late Beverley Barlow	Australia	7-Eleven Australia		
46 ▼	0.81 ▲	Ralph Sarich	Australia	Real estate		
47 ▲	0.80 ▲	Richard Smith	Australia	Food distribution		
48 ▼	0.77 ▲	John Kahlbetzer	Australia	Agriculture		
49 ▲	0.76 ▲	Christopher Morris	Australia	Software; hospitality		
50 ▲	0.75 ▲	Michael Heine	Australia	Financial services		

Legend
Icon	Description
Steady	Has not changed from the previous year
▲	Has increased from the previous year
▼	Has decreased from the previous year

== See also ==
- Financial Review Rich List
- Forbes list of Australia's 50 richest people
