= Forbes list of Australia's 50 richest people 2017 =

The Forbes list of Australia's 50 richest people is the annual survey of the 50 wealthiest people resident in Australia, published by Forbes Asia in January 2017.

The net worth of the wealthiest individual, Gina Rinehart, was estimated to be US$14.80 billion.

== List of individuals ==
2017		Name	Citizenship	Source of wealth	2016	
Rank	Net worth US$ bn	Name	Citizenship	Source of wealth	Rank	Net worth US$ bn
1 ▲	14.80 ▲	Gina Rinehart	Australia	Hancock Prospecting; investment	2 ▼	8.50 ▼
2 ▲	9.90 ▲	Harry Triguboff	Australia	Meriton	3 ▼	6.90 ▲
3 ▲	5.80 ▲	Anthony Pratt	Australia	Visy; Pratt Industries	5 ▲	3.60 ▲
4	5.70 ▲	Frank Lowy	Australia	Ex-Westfield; property	4 ▼	5.00
5 ▲	5.00 ▲	Bianca Rinehart, John Hancock, Ginia Rinehart and Hope Welker	Australia	Resources	n/a	not listed
6 ▲	4.40 ▲	Andrew Forrest	Australia	Fortescue	22 ▼	1.24 ▼
7	4.10 ▲	John Gandel	Australia	Property (shopping centres)	7 ▼	3.20 ▼
8 ▼	3.70 ▲	James Packer	Australia	Crown Resorts; Consolidated Media Holdings	6 ▼	3.50 ▼
9 ▲	3.50 ▲	Lindsay Fox	Australia	Linfox	8 ▲	2.80 ▼
10 ▲	3.40 ▲	Mike Cannon-Brookes	Australia	Atlassian	14 ▲	1.78 ▲
10 ▲	3.40 ▲	Scott Farquhar	Australia	Atlassian	15 ▲	1.75 ▲
12		Fiona Geminder	Australia	Manufacturing; investment	12	1.83 ▼
13 ▲		Alan Wilson and family	Australia	Reece Group; retail	16 ▼	1.60 ▼
14 ▲	2.60 ▼	Kerry Stokes	Australia	Property; Seven West Media; resources	27 ▼	1.00 ▼
15 ▲		Stan Perron	Australia	Property	17 ▼	1.54 ▼
16 ▲		Lang Walker	Australia	Walker Corporation (property)	26 ▼	1.02 ▼
17 ▼		Sir Michael Hintze	Australia; United Kingdom	Retail; investment	13 ▲	1.80 ▼
18 ▲		Heloise Waislitz	Australia	Manufacturing; investment	20 ▼	1.30 ▼
19 ▼		David Hains	Australia	Investment	10 ▲	1.90 ▼
20 ▲		Maurice Alter	Australia	Property (shopping centres)	24 ▼	1.10 ▼
21 ▲		Tony and Ron Perich	Australia	Investment	32 ▲	0.77 ▲
22 ▼		Jack Cowin	Australia	Competitive Foods Australia; investment	18 ▲	1.50 ▲
23 ▲	1.70 ▲	Angela Bennett	Australia	Resources	29 ▲	0.93 ▼
24 ▼		Kerr Neilson	Australia	Financial services	11 ▼	1.85 ▼
25 ▼		Gerry Harvey	Australia	Harvey Norman; retail	19 ▼	1.35 ▲
26 ▲		Judith Neilson	Australia	Investment	37 ▲	0.72 ▲
27 ▲	1.40 ▲	Manny Stul	Australia	Retail; toys	n/a	not listed
28 ▼		Bob Ell	Australia	Property development	23 ▼	1.20
29 ▼		David Teoh	Australia	Telecommunications	9 ▲	1.95 ▲
30		Solomon Lew	Australia	Premier Investments; retail	30	0.92 ▼
31 ▼		John van Lieshout	Australia	Real estate	28 ▼	0.97 ▼
32 ▲		Richard White	Australia	WiseTech Global	n/a	not listed
33 ▲		Brett Blundy	Australia	Retail; agribusiness	42 ▼	0.645 ▼
		Sam Tarascio	Australia	Real estate	36 ▼	0.735 ▲
		Gretel Packer	Australia	Crown Resorts; investment	49 ▲	0.51 ▲
		Nigel Austin	Australia	Cotton On Group; retail	47 ▲	0.565 ▲
		Alan Rydge	Australia	Rydges Hotels & Resorts	21 ▲	1.27 ▲
		Maha Sinnathamby	Australia	Real estate	41 ▼	0.65 ▼
		Paul Little	Australia	Logistics; real estate	31 ▲	0.83 ▲
		Chris Wallin	Australia	Mining	n/a	not listed
		Len Ainsworth	Australia	Gaming; manufacturing	33 ▼	0.76 ▼
		Bruce Mathieson	Australia	Hotels	43 ▲	0.64 ▲
		Con Makris	Australia	Real estate	38 ▲	0.70 ▲
		Russ Withers and family of the late Beverley Barlow	Australia	7-Eleven Australia	25 ▲	1.10 ▲
		Ralph Sarich	Australia	Real estate	40 ▲	0.66
		Richard Smith	Australia	Food distribution	44 ▲	0.615 ▲
		John Kahlbetzer	Australia	Agriculture	35 ▲	0.74 ▼
		Christopher Morris	Australia	Software; hospitality	48 ▼	0.55 ▼

Legend
Icon	Description
Steady	Has not changed from the previous year
▲	Has increased from the previous year
▼	Has decreased from the previous year

== See also ==
- Financial Review Rich List
- Forbes list of Australia's 50 richest people
