= Forbes list of Australia's 50 richest people 2018 =

The Forbes list of Australia's 50 richest people is the annual survey of the fifty wealthiest people resident in Australia, published by Forbes Asia in January 2018.

The net worth of the wealthiest individual, Gina Rinehart, was estimated to be US$17.40 billion.

== List of individuals ==
The following is the list of Australia's 50 richest people for the year of 2018.

2018		Name	Citizenship	Source of wealth	2017	
Rank	Net worth US$ bn	Name	Citizenship	Source of wealth	Rank	Net worth US$ bn
1	17.40 ▲	Gina Rinehart	Australia	Hancock Prospecting; investment	1 ▲	14.80 ▲
2		Harry Triguboff	Australia	Meriton	2 ▲	9.90 ▲
3		Anthony Pratt	Australia	Visy; Pratt Industries	3 ▲	5.80 ▲
4		Frank Lowy	Australia	Ex-Westfield; property	4	5.70 ▲
5 ▲		Mike Cannon-Brookes	Australia	Atlassian	10 ▲	3.40 ▲
5 ▲		Scott Farquhar	Australia	Atlassian	10 ▲	3.40 ▲
7 ▼		Andrew Forrest	Australia	Fortescue	6 ▲	4.40 ▲
8 ▼		John Gandel	Australia	Property (shopping centres)	7	4.10 ▲
9 ▼		James Packer	Australia	Crown Resorts; Consolidated Media Holdings	8 ▼	3.70 ▲
10 ▼		Lindsay Fox	Australia	Linfox	9 ▲	3.50 ▲
11 ▼		Bianca Rinehart, John Hancock, Ginia Rinehart and Hope Welker	Australia	Resources	5 ▲	5.00 ▲
12 ▲		Kerry Stokes	Australia	Property; Seven West Media; resources	14 ▲	2.60 ▼
13 ▲		Sir Michael Hintze	Australia; United Kingdom	Retail; investment	17 ▼	
14 ▲		Alan Wilson and family	Australia	Reece Group; retail	13 ▲	
15 ▲		Lang Walker	Australia	Walker Corporation (property)	16 ▲	
16 ▲		Fiona Geminder	Australia	Manufacturing; investment	12	
17 ▲		Richard White	Australia	WiseTech Global	32 ▲	
18 ▲		Maurice Alter	Australia	Property (shopping centres)	20 ▲	
19		David Hains	Australia	Investment	19 ▼	
20 ▲		Clive Palmer	Australia	Mineralogy and other mining interests; hospitality	n/a	not listed
21 ▼		Heloise Waislitz	Australia	Manufacturing; investment	18 ▲	
22 ▼		Tony and Ron Perich	Australia	Investment	21 ▲	
23 ▼		Jack Cowin	Australia	Competitive Foods Australia; investment	22 ▼	
24 ▼		Angela Bennett	Australia	Resources	23 ▲	1.70 ▲
25 ▲		David Teoh	Australia	Telecommunications	29 ▼	
26 ▲		Gretel Packer	Australia	Crown Resorts; investment		
27 ▲		Nigel Austin	Australia	Cotton On Group; retail		
28 ▼		Solomon Lew	Australia	Premier Investments; retail	30	
29 ▲		Brett Blundy	Australia	Retail; agribusiness	33 ▲	
30 ▲		Bob Ell	Australia	Property development	28 ▼	
31 ▼		John van Lieshout	Australia	Real estate		
32 ▼		Gerry Harvey	Australia	Harvey Norman; retail	25 ▼	
33 ▼		Manny Stul	Australia	Retail; toys	27 ▲	1.40 ▲
34 ▼		Kerr Neilson	Australia	Financial services	24 ▼	
	1.00	Sam Tarascio	Australia	Real estate		
36 ▲		Terry Snow	Australia	Capital Airport Group; property development	n/a	not listed
37 ▼		Judith Neilson	Australia	Investment	26 ▲	
38 ▼		Alan Rydge	Australia	Rydges Hotels & Resorts		
39 ▲		Maha Sinnathamby	Australia	Real estate		
40 ▼		Paul Little	Australia	Logistics; real estate		
41 ▲		Chris Wallin	Australia	Mining		
42 ▼		Len Ainsworth	Australia	Gaming; manufacturing	31 ▼	
43		Bruce Mathieson	Australia	Hotels		
44 ▼		Con Makris	Australia	Real estate		
45 ▼		Russ Withers and family of the late Beverley Barlow	Australia	7-Eleven Australia		
46 ▼		Ralph Sarich	Australia	Real estate		
47 ▲		Richard Smith	Australia	Food distribution		
48 ▼		John Kahlbetzer	Australia	Agriculture		
49 ▲		Christopher Morris	Australia	Software; hospitality		

Legend
Icon	Description
Steady	Has not changed from the previous year
▲	Has increased from the previous year
▼	Has decreased from the previous year

== See also ==
- Financial Review Rich List
- Forbes list of Australia's 50 richest people
