= Australia's Richest 250 =

Annual list published by The Australian

The List – Australia's Richest 250
- Annual list of Australia's richest 250, ranked in order of net worth
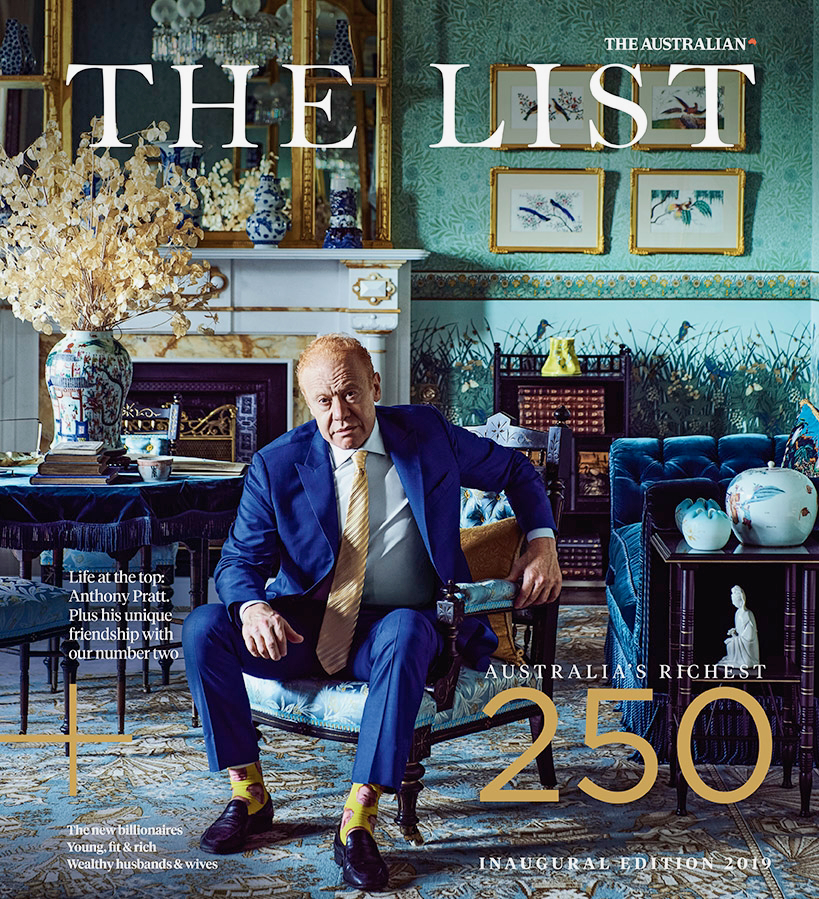

Publication details
- Publisher: News Corp Australia
- Publication: The Australian
- First published: 2019
- Latest publication: 2023

Current list details (2023)
- Wealthiest: Gina Rinehart
- Net worth (1st): ▲ A$$37.10 billion
- Number of billionaires: ▲139
- Total list net worth value: ▲ A$532 billion
- New members to the list: ▲16

The List – Australia's Richest 250 is a study of Australia's 250 richest people and families, published annually in The Australian newspaper and on its website.

The list ranks the country's wealthiest people from one to 250, in order of their net worth.

Each listing includes the name and role of the individuals on the list, their wealth this year, their wealth last year and a commentary on their year in business, including the decisions, plans or internal or external factors that have led to their wealth rising or falling.

The list is published annually in March in a glossy magazine inserted into The Australian and online.

== Background and history ==
The List – Australia’s Richest 250 was launched in March 2019. It is compiled by journalist John Stensholt using a combination of publicly available data and interviews with most of the entrants on the list.

The March 2019 edition featured cardboard and recycling king Anthony Pratt on the cover. Pratt was photographed for the edition at his home in Melbourne. Pratt was the wealthiest person in Australia that year with a fortune estimated to be $13.14 billion.

The 2020 edition carried the coverline "Millennial Billionaire" and featured Melanie Perkins one of the co-founders of the graphic services company Canva. Perkins was 32 years old at the time, making her Australia's youngest ever billionaire with a valuation of $1.32 billion.

In 2021 The List – Australia’s Richest 250 featured Scott Farquhar, who with Mike Cannon Brookes co-founded the Australian technology firm Atlassian. In 2021 Farquhar was worth $21.95b making him number 4 on the list.

In 2022 The List – Australia’s Richest 250 featured the hospitality industry entrepreneur Justin Hemmes of Merival on the cover. In 2022 Hemmes and his family and a fortune estimated to be worth $1.31 billion, making him number 101 on the list.

The 2023 edition of the list was published on March 24.

== Facts and figures ==
In 2019 the combined wealth of all the 250 richest Australians on the list was $318.33 billion. Since the magazine has been published the combined wealth has grown each year. In 2020 it was $377.77 billion. In 2021 it was $470.07 billion.

In 2022 it was $520.20 billion, and in 2023 it is $531.96 billion.

The combined wealth of the richest 250 Australians has grown by 67.1% from 2019 to 2023.

The number of women on the list in 2019, 2020 and 2021 was 27. That number grew to 30 in 2022.

The average age of everyone on the list has consistently stayed the same at 65 years old.

The youngest person to ever appear on the list was Tobi Pearce who was 26 years old when he appeared in 2019. The oldest person to appear on the list was Leonard Ainsworth in 2023 at the age of 99.

In 2019 Australia had 96 billionaires. That number has steadily grown year on year. In 2020 Australia had 117 billionaires. In 2021 it was 122 billionaires. In 2022 it increased to 131 billionaires, and in 2023 139 billionaires were included in the list. Western Australian mining magnate Gina Rinehart was the wealthiest individual on the list for the third consecutive year with a net worth of $37.1b.

There were 16 new entrants on the list in 2023, with Stake.com co-founder Edward Craven debuting the highest at number 68 with a net worth of $2.01b.

Data from the last five years of The List – Australia’s Richest 250 reveals that the single biggest source of wealth in Australia comes from property followed by investment, retail, technology and mining. In 2023 57 people on the Richest 250 list made their fortune in property.

The most popular suburbs for the wealthiest Australians are Toorak in Melbourne, with 20 people on the list, followed by Vaucluse and Point Piper in Sydney with 12 people each.

== See also ==
- Forbes list of Australia's 50 richest people
