= Mental Health Research Institute =

Mental Health Research Institute may refer to:

- Mental Research Institute, in Palo Alto
- Mental Health Research Institute (Melbourne)
- Mental Health Research Institute (Michigan)
