= Paula Fox Melanoma and Cancer Centre =

Medical institute in Melbourne

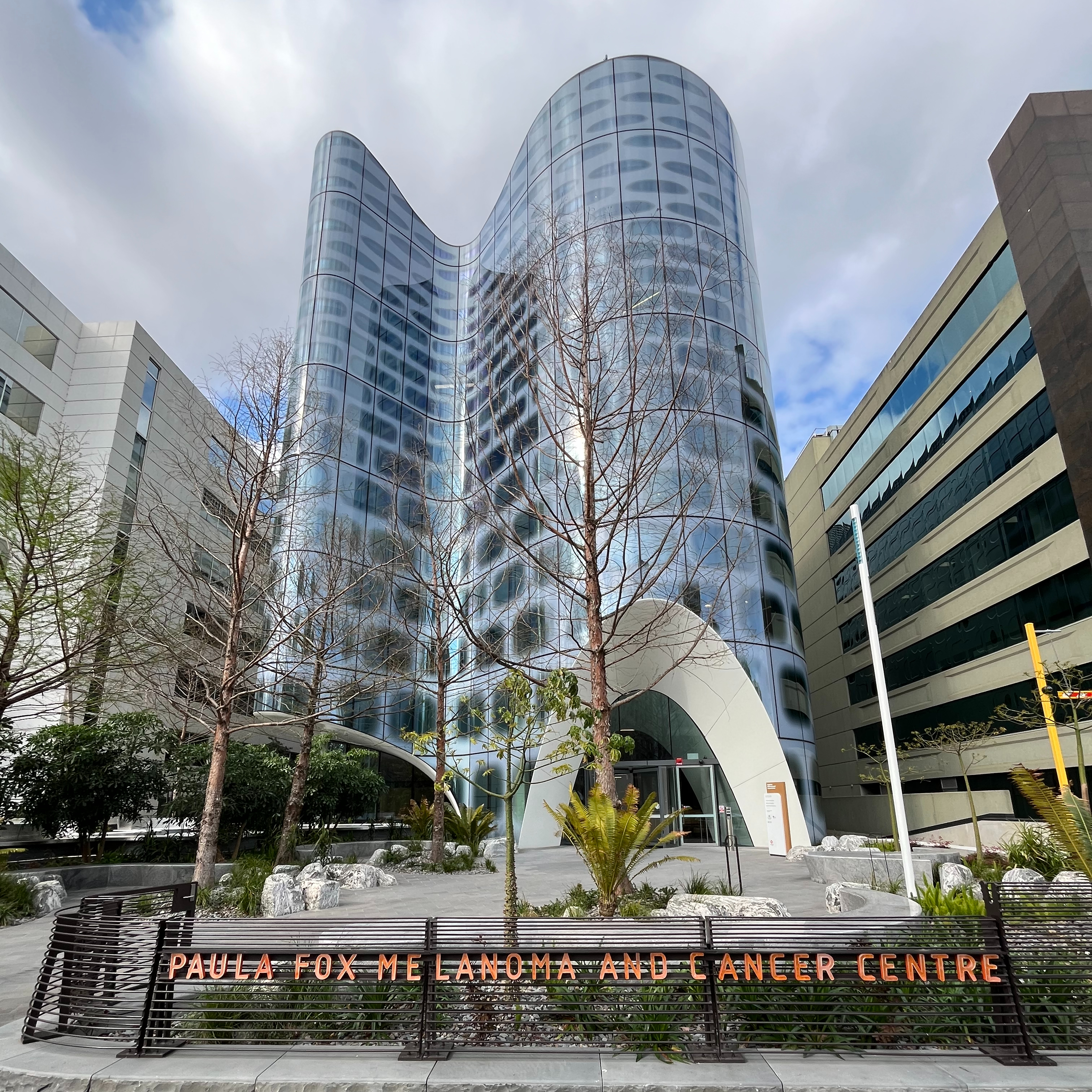
- The centre viewed from the front door
- Mission: Medical research, patient care, education
- Focus: Oncology research and cancer treatment
- Location: 545 St Kilda Rd, Melbourne, Melbourne, Victoria, Australia
- Website: www.alfredhealth.org.au/services/paula-fox-melanoma-and-cancer-centre

The Paula Fox Melanoma and Cancer Centre is a medical centre and research institute in Melbourne, Australia.

== History ==
Construction of the centre began on 20 June 2022. The budget for the construction was A$152 million, with the state and federal government each contributing A$50 million. Kane Constructions delivered the project. The exterior of the building was designed by Lyons Architecture to look like a skin graft.

The centre is named after Paula Fox, wife of Australian billionaire businessman Lindsay Fox, who financially contributed to the construction.

The centre was officially opened on 19 April 2024 by Victorian premier Jacinta Allan and prime minister Anthony Albanese.

== Structure ==
The centre includes areas for delivering treatment to cancer patients, as well as laboratory spaces for cancer research.
