= Richard Pratt (businessman) =

Australian businessman (1934–2009)

Richard J. Pratt
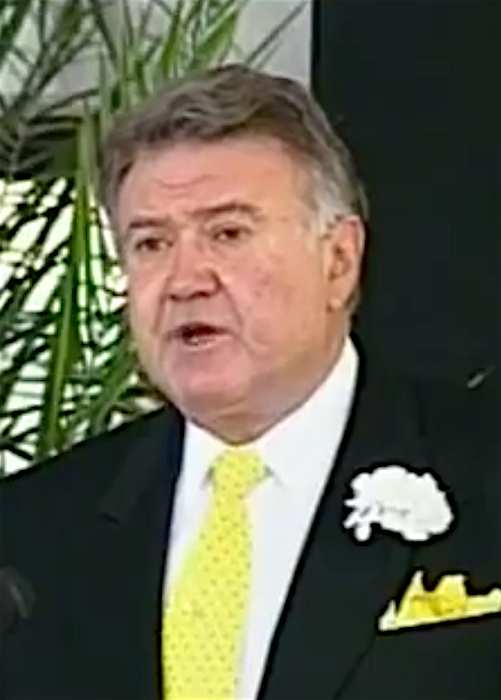
- Pratt in 1997
- Born: Ryszard Przecicki; 10 December 1934; Free City of Danzig (present-day Gdańsk, Poland)
- Died: 28 April 2009 (aged 74); Kew, Victoria, Australia
- Other name: Ryszard Przecicki
- Known for: Businessman; President of the Carlton Football Club
- Spouse: Jeanne Lasker
- Children: Four (including Anthony Pratt)

Richard J. Pratt (born Ryszard Przecicki; 10 December 1934 – 28 April 2009) was an Australian businessman, chairman of the privately owned company Visy Industries, and a leading figure of Melbourne society. In the year before his death, Pratt was Australia's fourth-richest person, with a personal fortune valued at A$5.48 billion.

== Early life ==
Ryszard Przecicki was born in the Free City of Danzig (present-day Gdańsk, Poland) to Jewish parents Leon and Paula on 10 December 1934. His family emigrated to Australia in 1938, seeking safe refuge from the Nazis, and settled in Shepparton, Victoria, changing their surname from Przecicki to Pratt. Pratt had a rough journey travelling to Australia without getting caught by the Nazis. The family faced food shortages en route. Pratt was educated at Grahamvale Primary School, Shepparton High School, and University High School, and he enrolled in a Bachelor of Commerce degree at the University of Melbourne in 1953. He played Australian rules football as a ruckman. After starting his career at Lemnos (now the Shepparton Swans), Pratt played for Carlton in the Victorian Football League's (VFL) under-19s competition. He was awarded the Morrish Medal in 1953 for being deemed the "best and fairest" U-19 player that year. Pratt did not continue his footballing career to senior VFL level, instead focusing on other interests.

Pratt combined study with acting with the Union Theatre Repertory Company and working as salesman for the family business, Visy Board. After touring London and New York in 1957 with a production of Ray Lawler's Summer of the Seventeenth Doll, playing the role of Johnnie Dowd, he returned to Melbourne and Visy. He also appeared on television.

== Business career ==
Following the death of his father Leon in February 1969, Pratt took over his father's business at Visy Industries, which at that time had several hundred employees and an annual turnover of A$5 million. Under Pratt's direction, Visy expanded from two factories in Melbourne to more than 55 plants across Australia, United States, New Zealand, and Papua New Guinea. From cardboard boxes and packaging, Visy moved into waste paper recycling. Later in the 1990s, Pratt expanded his operations considerably into the New York waste paper business.

In 1993, the National Crime Authority (NCA) raided Pratt's offices in connection with an investigation into businessman John Elliott's foreign exchange dealings and Elliott's spoiling domestic stake in BHP while Elliott's company, Elders IXL, was insolvent. The following year, NCA paid costs and returned documents seized.

Also in the 1990s, Visy was ordered by the Australian Competition & Consumer Commission (ACCC) to pay a half-million-dollar fine for illegal anti-competitive behaviour.

== Public career ==
As well as his business interests, Pratt was known for his involvement in public service, having held posts including foundation chancellor of Swinburne University of Technology, president of the Victorian Arts Centre Trust, and Chairman of the Board of Management of the Mental Health Research Institute of Victoria.

Through the Pratt Foundation, the Pratt family are among Australia's leading philanthropists, donating up to A$10 million a year. Pratt was named Environmental Visionary of the Year in 1998 by the Keep Australia Beautiful Campaign.

Pratt also donated considerable funds to both major political parties (for example, A$300,000 in Financial Year 2004–05), as well as to Prime Minister John Howard's Liberal government.

In 1996, an investigation by The Australian newspaper documented from internal company documents that Pratt maintained a multimillion-dollar network of advisors. This included an $8,300-a-month fee to Bob Hawke for consultation on "Asian and government matters", $27,000 for travel to the US for Gough Whitlam as business advisor on overseas markets, and other sums for former state premiers Nick Greiner and Rupert Hamer.

== Sports administration career ==
=== Carlton Football Club President ===
On 8 February 2007, he was appointed President of the Carlton Football Club, after being elected by the board of the club, when he replaced Graham Smorgon. In his tenure as Carlton Football Club President, Pratt was largely responsible for overseeing major changes at Carlton Football Club, which would help put the club back on track to become a powerhouse again where Pratt was also largely responsible for bringing in major sponsor Hyundai and for helping the Blues crack 40,000 members for the first time. One of the other major changes to the club's administration in Pratt's tenure as President of the club was the appointment of Steven Icke as General Manager of Football Operations and the appointment of former CEO of Collingwood Football Club, Greg Swann as the CEO of Carlton Football Club. The club also returned to a stable off-field position during Pratt's presidency.

On 20 June 2008, the Carlton Football Club announced that Pratt would stand aside from the club until the charges of giving false and misleading evidence to the ACCC hearing were resolved. Stephen Kernahan then took over and replaced Pratt as President of the Carlton Football Club.

== Personal life ==
In 1959, Pratt married Jeanne (née Lasker), a journalist, who was also a Jewish immigrant from Poland, born in the town of Łowicz in 1936, and before their marriage lived in Sydney. After the success of Visy Industries, they enjoyed a lavish lifestyle, with a private jet and a range of apartments, including a penthouse at the Sherry-Netherland Hotel in New York City; their main home was the historic mansion Raheen, in the Melbourne suburb of Kew, the former residence of Roman Catholic Archbishop Daniel Mannix. The Pratts have had three children, Anthony, Heloise Waislitz, who was married to businessman and Collingwood Football club Vice President Alex Waislitz, and Fiona Geminder.

Another daughter, Paula, was born in 1997 to his longtime mistress, socialite Shari-Lea Hitchcock. In 2000, this affair became the subject of widespread media attention owing to a court case involving Ms Hitchcock and a nanny hired to look after her daughter. At the time, Pratt was accused of trying to pay hush money to the nanny who had launched legal action against Ms Hitchcock.

Pratt was the godfather of Deborah Beale, who is the former wife of Bill Shorten and daughter of Julian Beale.

After a well-publicised battle with prostate cancer, Pratt died at his Kew residence on 28 April 2009, the day after all charges against him had been dropped due to his ill health.

== Philanthropy ==
Pratt donated A$10 million every year through the Pratt Foundation to refugees, artists and others. The Foundation was established in 1978 by Jeanne and Richard Pratt as a vehicle for their philanthropy. During the 1980s and 1990s, the Pratts became known in Australia for funding the arts, medical research and higher education. Since then, the Pratt family has donated about A$200 million to worthy causes. Jeanne also set up The Production Company, which produced musicals in Melbourne from 1999–2020.

== Conviction for price fixing ==
In December 2005, the ACCC commenced a civil penalty proceeding against Visy companies, Pratt, and others, for alleged involvement in a cartel in the packaging industry.

On 10 October 2007, Pratt was formally accused of price fixing, cheating customers and companies out of approximately A$700 million in the nation's biggest-ever cartel case.

The ACCC alleged "very serious contraventions" of the law and that these had been "carefully and deliberately concealed" by Visy senior executives. The ACCC counsel further stated:

"There can be no suggestion that Visy acted in ignorance of its obligations under the act"

and further added that the deliberate use of pre-paid mobile phones that could not be traced and the holding of meetings in private homes, motel rooms and suburban parks

"...provides a strong indication that Visy was fully aware that the conduct was illegal".

After more than a year of denials, Pratt subsequently admitted his guilt, acknowledging he and his company, and "rival" company Amcor, deliberately broke the law. Pratt was aggrieved by the criminal prosecution and its effect on his reputation, stating:

"I feel very angry—Visy is seen as Richard Pratt's company—there is a certain amount of character assassination for me personally because I am a tall poppy in the community; it's a big scalp (for the ACCC). My reputation is something I have been building for 50 years and so I am worried that the general public will now see me as a rich person who has made his money doing something that is wrong in the eyes of the law."

On 2 November 2007, Pratt and the Visy group received a $36 million fine, representing both the largest fine in Australian history and an estimated 0.75% of the Pratt fortune. Federal Court of Australia judge Justice Heerey said Pratt and his senior executives were knowingly concerned in the cartel, which involved price fixing and market sharing. "This is the worst cartel to come before the courts in 30-plus years", Justice Heerey said. Additionally, customers of Visy initiated claims against Visy and Amcor, including a $120 million suit by Cadbury Schweppes against Amcor.

=== Criminal prosecution for impropriety ===
On 19 June 2008, Pratt was charged with lying about his knowledge of a price-fixing scandal. Pratt had been facing four separate charges under Section 5 of the Act, the penalty for each charge ranges from a fine of $2,200 to 12 months' jail.

On 27 April 2009, this criminal prosecution of Pratt for charges of impropriety (lying to the ACCC during its successful investigation into the Visy/Amcor price-fixing scandal) were abandoned on account of his poor health and impending death. However, Commonwealth Prosecutor Mark Dean SC told the Federal Court the Commonwealth Director of Public Prosecutions believed the prosecution would have succeeded. Pratt died the following day.

== Honours ==
Pratt was appointed an Officer of the Order of Australia (AO) in 1985, and a Companion of the Order (AC) in 1998. Jeanne Pratt has also been appointed a Companion of the Order of Australia. However, Richard Pratt returned his awards in February 2008 after he was fined A$36 million for price fixing.

On 16 May 2007, he was awarded the Woodrow Wilson Medal for Corporate Citizenship. This is given to executives who "by their examples and their business practices, have shown a deep concern for the common good beyond the bottom line. They are at the forefront of the idea that private firms should be good citizens in their own neighborhoods and in the world at large".

In April 2010, to mark the first anniversary of his death, the inaugural Richard Pratt Memorial Oration was delivered at the University of Melbourne by the president of the Hebrew University of Jerusalem, Professor Menahem Ben-Sasson. During the oration, Pratt was posthumously awarded an honorary Doctorate of Philosophy from Hebrew University.

In every Carlton Football Club home match against the Collingwood Football Club in the Australian Football League, the winner takes home a cup named after Pratt.
