= Paula Fox (philanthropist) =

Australian philanthropist and fundraiser

Paula Grace Fox
- Born: Paula Grace Peele
- Known for: philanthropy
- Spouse: Lindsay Fox (m. 1959)
- Children: 6

Paula Grace Fox AC (born Peele) is an Australian philanthropist.

Fox was diagnosed with melanoma and treated at The Alfred Hospital in Melbourne. A conversation with her surgeon led to a large donation and effort to create what has become the Paula Fox Melanoma and Cancer Centre, a partnership between The Alfred, Monash University and Minderoo Foundation.

Fox and her husband Lindsay Fox have also been major donors to the establishment of The Fox: NGV Contemporary, a contemporary art gallery in Melbourne.

Fox was created an Officer of the Order of Australia in the 2015 Queen's Birthday Honours for distinguished service to the community through philanthropic contributions to, and committed fundraising support and advocacy for, a range of arts, cultural, youth, research and social welfare organisations.

She was promoted to Companion of the Order of Australia in the 2026 Australia Day Honours "for eminent service to the arts, to medical research, and to children and youth, through philanthropic giving, fundraising and governance".

Paula Grace Peele married Lindsay Fox in 1959.
