= Chameleon (novel) =

Novel by Richard Hains

- First edition
- Author: Richard Hains
- Language: English
- Genre: Financial thriller
- Published: 2006 (Beaufort Books)
- ISBN: 978-0825305108

Chameleon is a financial thriller novel written by hedge fund manager Richard Hains set during the subprime mortgage crisis, first published by Beaufort Books in 2006.

== Promotion ==
To promote Chameleon, Hains started a contest offering an all-expense-paid weekend to London, where someone could enter by reading the book and answering three questions.

== Reception ==
Chameleon received reviews from publications including Publishers Weekly, Midwest Book Review, and Herald Sun.

Publishers Weekly wrote that "Hedge fund partner Hains's strong suit is insider financial info, but the basic plot, characters and writing are all formulaic. There's a continuing, valiant attempt to heat up the action with a variety of lurid sexual encounters, but even this effort can't lift what's run-of-the-mill into out-of-the-ordinary." Herald Sun wrote that "the book is an attempt at Da Vinci Code meets Wall Street."

The book was also a finalist for the National Book Award in the Mystery category.

== Film adaptation ==
A film adaptation of Chameleon was planned to be produced and shown at the Cannes Film Festival. The film was set to be directed by Richard Gibson and produced by Richard Hains and Mark Pennell. As of 2019, a film adaptation has not been released.
