= Forbes list of Australia's 50 richest people =

- List of 50 Australians, ranked in order of net worth

Publication details
- Publisher: Forbes
- Publication: Forbes Asia magazine and online
- Latest publication: January 15, 2019

Current list details (2019)
- Wealthiest Australian: -
- Net worth (1st): ▼US$14.8 billion
- Entry point (50th): ▲US$750 million

The Forbes list of Australia's 50 richest people is a list of Australia's fifty wealthiest individuals and families, ranked by personal net worth, updated and published annually by Forbes Asia magazine. The list provides a short summary on some of the known business activities of the individuals and families, together with commentary on how their ranking has changed from the previous year, if they were listed in that prior year. The list is published annually in January in an online format and then updated daily, also online.

In 2019, the entry mark for the 50th richest individual was US$750 million. The wealthiest individual in the 2019 list was Gina Rinehart, estimated to have a personal net worth of US$14.8 billion; a US$2.6 billion decrease in her personal net worth of US$17.4 billion, as estimated by Forbes in 2018. 2019 marked the eighth time that Rinehart had headed the list.

Prior to 2013, the list included the 40 richest people in Australia; it was expanded to Australia's 50 wealthiest individuals and families in 2013.

== Lists by year ==
- Forbes list of Australia's 40 richest people, 2011
- Forbes list of Australia's 40 richest people, 2012
- Forbes list of Australia's 50 richest people, 2013
- Forbes list of Australia's 50 richest people, 2014
- Forbes list of Australia's 50 richest people, 2015
- Forbes list of Australia's 50 richest people, 2016
- Forbes list of Australia's 50 richest people, 2017
- Forbes list of Australia's 50 richest people, 2018
- Forbes list of Australia's 50 richest people, 2019

== Members of Australia's 50 richest people ==
The table below is the list compiled by Forbes Asia, comparing movement from the previous year:

Forbes Asia Australia's 50^{[note a]} richest
Name	2011		2012		2013		2014		2015	
Name	Rank	Net worth (US$ billion)	Rank	Net worth (US$ billion)	Rank	Net worth (US$ billion)	Rank	Net worth (US$ billion)	Rank	Net worth (US$ billion)
Gina Rinehart	1 ▲	9.00 ▲	1	18.00 ▲	1	17.00 ▼	1	17.70 ▲	1	11.70 ▼
Harry Triguboff	5 ▼	3.40 ▲	6 ▼	4.00 ▲	6	4.60 ▲	7 ▼	4.30 ▼	2 ▲	5.60 ▲
Anthony Pratt	7 ▲	2.70 ▲	7 ▼	3.40 ▲	7	4.50 ▲	2 ▲	7.00 ▲	7 ▼	3.50 ▼
Frank Lowy	4 ▼	4.30 ▲	5 ▼	4.40 ▲	4 ▲	5.30 ▲	6 ▼	4.60 ▼	3 ▲	5.00 ▲
Mike Cannon-Brookes	n/a	not listed	n/a	not listed	n/a	not listed	n/a	not listed	25 ▲	1.10 ▲
Scott Farquhar	n/a	not listed	n/a	not listed	n/a	not listed	n/a	not listed	25 ▲	1.10 ▲
Andrew Forrest	2 ▼	6.90 ▲	3 ▼	5.30 ▼	5 ▼	4.80 ▲	5	5.00 ▲	10 ▼	2.10 ▼
John Gandel	6 ▼	3.30 ▲	8 ▼	3.20 ▼	8	3.50 ▲	8	3.20 ▼	6 ▲	3.60 ▲
James Packer	3	4.40 ▲	4 ▼	4.50 ▲	3 ▲	6.00 ▲	3	6.60 ▲	4 ▼	4.70 ▼
Lindsay Fox	11 ▼	1.70 ▲	14 ▼	1.60 ▼	14	1.95 ▲	11 ▲	2.20 ▲	9 ▲	2.90 ▲
Kerry Stokes	10 ▲	1.90 ▲	12 ▼	1.80 ▼	13 ▼	2.00 ▲	16 ▼	1.60 ▼	23 ▼	1.20 ▼
Michael Hintze	15 ▼	1.40 ▲	16 ▼	1.40	16	1.55 ▲	15 ▲	1.70 ▲	15	1.90 ▲
Wilson Family	13 ▼	1.50 ▼	17 ▼	1.35 ▼	15 ▼	1.60 ▲	13 ▲	1.90 ▲	14 ▲	2.00 ▲
Lang Walker	22 ▲	0.95 ▲	21 ▲	0.95	18 ▲	1.20 ▲	21 ▼	1.16 ▼	21	1.20 ▲
Fiona Geminder	n/a	not listed	n/a	not listed	n/a	not listed	n/a	not listed	12 ▲	2.10 ▲
Maurice Alter	32 ▼	0.70 ▲	30 ▲	0.78 ▲	32 ▼	0.89 ▲	30 ▼	0.96 ▲	19 ▲	1.20 ▲
David Hains	9 ▲	2.00 ▲	11 ▼	2.00	11	2.30 ▲	12 ▼	2.10 ▼	11 ▲	2.10
Clive Palmer	n/a	not listed	29 ▲	0.80 ▲	31 ▼	0.90 ▲	50 ▼	0.55 ▼	n/a ▼	not listed
Heloise Waislitz	n/a	not listed	n/a	not listed	n/a	not listed	n/a	not listed	13 ▲	2.00 ▲
Tony & Ron Perich	n/a	not listed	n/a	not listed	n/a	not listed	n/a	not listed	39 ▲	0.75 ▲
Jack Cowin	n/a	not listed	n/a	not listed	n/a	not listed	n/a	not listed	29 ▲	1.00 ▲
Angela Bennett	12 ▲	1.55 ▲	9 ▲	2.30 ▲	30 ▼	0.90 ▼	25 ▲	1.01 ▲	31 ▼	0.97 ▼
David Teoh	n/a	not listed	n/a ▲	not listed	29 ▲	0.91 ▲	17 ▲	1.50 ▲	17	1.60 ▲
Solomon Lew	18 ▼	1.15 ▲	20 ▼	1.10 ▼	19 ▲	1.16 ▲	26 ▼	1.00 ▼	30 ▼	0.98 ▼
Brett Blundy	n/a	not listed	39 ▲	0.66 ▲	33 ▲	0.84 ▲	39 ▲	0.71 ▼	38 ▲	0.77 ▲
Bob Ell	n/a	not listed	n/a	not listed	26 ▲	0.96 ▲	22 ▲	1.10 ▲	19 ▲	1.20 ▲
John Van Lieshout	24 ▼	0.87 ▲	24	0.87	21 ▼	1.04 ▲	28 ▼	0.97 ▼	27 ▲	1.00 ▲
Gerry Harvey	17 ▼	1.20 ▼	23 ▼	0.90 ▼	28 ▼	0.93 ▲	20 ▲	1.18 ▲	18 ▲	1.30 ▲
Kerr Neilson	8 ▼	2.40 ▲	10 ▼	2.10 ▼	9 ▲	2.50 ▲	10 ▼	2.90 ▲	8 ▲	3.00 ▲
Sam Tarascio	n/a	not listed	n/a	not listed	n/a	not listed	n/a	not listed	42 ▲	0.71 ▲
Terry Snow	n/a	not listed	n/a	not listed	39 ▲	0.76 ▲	46 ▼	0.62 ▼	n/a ▼	not listed
Judith Neilson	n/a	not listed	n/a	not listed	n/a	not listed	n/a	not listed	n/a	not listed
Alan Rydge	n/a	not listed	n/a	not listed	25 ▲	0.98 ▲	23 ▲	1.03 ▲	22 ▲	1.20 ▲
Maha Sinnathamby	n/a	not listed	n/a	not listed	n/a	not listed	42 ▲	0.69 ▲	40 ▲	0.74 ▲
Paul Little	34 ▼	0.67 ▼	35 ▼	0.71 ▲	37 ▲	0.78 ▲	37	0.72 ▼	37	0.82 ▲
Len Ainsworth	n/a	not listed	n/a	not listed	22 ▲	1.03 ▲	18 ▲	1.30 ▲	24 ▼	1.20 ▼
Bruce Mathieson	28	0.73 ▲	37 ▼	0.69 ▼	42 ▼	0.73 ▲	35 ▼	0.75 ▲	48 ▼	0.61 ▼
Con Makris	n/a	not listed	n/a	not listed	47 ▲	0.66 ▲	45 ▲	0.63 ▼	46 ▼	0.64 ▲
Russ Withers and family of the late Beverley Barlow	n/a	not listed	n/a	not listed	n/a	not listed	n/a	not listed	n/a	not listed
Ralph Sarich	n/a	not listed	n/a	not listed	44 ▲	0.71 ▲	44	0.66 ▲	44	0.66 ▲
Richard Smith	30 ▲	0.71 ▲	31 ▼	0.74 ▲	35 ▼	0.79 ▲	32 ▼	0.84 ▼	45 ▼	0.65 ▼
John Kahlbetzer	n/a	not listed	n/a	not listed	34 ▲	0.83 ▲	34	0.76 ▼	36 ▼	0.83 ▲
Christopher Morris	33 ▲	0.69 ▲	n/a	not listed	48 ▲	0.65 ▲	47 ▲	0.59 ▼	47	0.63 ▲

^[note a] Up until 2013, the list included Australia's 40 Richest people; expanded to Australia's 50 Richest people in 2013.

Legend
Icon	Description
Steady	Has not changed from the previous year
▲	Has increased from the previous year
▼	Has decreased from the previous year

== Former members of Australia's 50 richest people list ==
The table below is an extract from the lists compiled by Forbes Asia; the extracted information below shows individuals who were once on the list but are not on the current list. Where appropriate, the extract compares movement from previous years.

Forbes Asia Australia's 50 Richest former members
Name	2011		2012		2013		2014		2015		2016		2017	
Name	Rank	Net worth (US$ billion)	Rank	Net worth (US$ billion)	Rank	Net worth (US$ billion)	Rank	Net worth (US$ billion)	Rank	Net worth (US$ billion)	Rank	Net worth (US$ billion)	Rank	Net worth (US$ billion)
Blair Parry-Okeden^{[note e]}	n/a	not listed	n/a	not listed	n/a	not listed	n/a	not listed	n/a	not listed	1 ▲	8.88 ▲	n/a ▼	not listed
Ivan Glasenberg	n/a	not listed	2 ▲	7.20 ▲	2	6.70 ▼	4 ▼	6.30 ▼	5 ▼	4.40 ▼	n/a ▼	not listed	n/a	not listed
Paul Salteri	21 ▼	0.98 ▲	22 ▼	0.94 ▼	23 ▼	1.00 ▲	27 ▼	0.99 ▼	28 ▼	1.00 ▲	n/a ▼	not listed	n/a	not listed
Raymond Barro	n/a	not listed	n/a	not listed	24 ▲	0.99 ▲	24	1.02 ▲	32 ▼	0.96 ▼	n/a ▼	not listed	n/a	not listed
Morry Fraid	n/a	not listed	n/a	not listed	36 ▲	0.79 ▲	31 ▼	0.90 ▲	33 ▼	0.95 ▲	n/a ▼	not listed	n/a	not listed
Bob Oatley^{[note d]}	25 ▼	0.85 ▲	25	0.86 ▲	27 ▼	0.95 ▲	33 ▼	0.83 ▼	34 ▼	0.91 ▲	n/a ▼	not listed	n/a	not listed
Greg Poche	31 ▼	0.70	33 ▼	0.73 ▲	41 ▼	0.74 ▲	38 ▲	0.71 ▲	43 ▼	0.68 ▼	n/a ▼	not listed	n/a	not listed
Geoff Harris	n/a	not listed	n/a	not listed	n/a	not listed	41 ▲	0.70 ▲	50 ▼	0.55 ▼	n/a ▼	not listed	n/a	not listed
Paul Ramsay^{[note b]}	14 ▲	1.45 ▲	13 ▲	1.70 ▲	10 ▲	2.40 ▲	9 ▲	3.00 ▲	n/a ▼	not listed	n/a	not listed	n/a	not listed
Len Buckeridge	19 ▲	1.10 ▲	19	1.25 ▲	17 ▲	1.40 ▲	19 ▲	1.20 ▼	n/a ▼	not listed	n/a	not listed	n/a	not listed
Mukul Garg	29	0.74 ▲	38 ▼	0.69 ▼	42 ▼	0.74 ▲	35 ▼	0.76 ▲	n/a ▼	not listed	n/a	not listed	n/a	not listed
Ian Norman^{[note c]}	37 ▼	0.64 ▲	n/a ▼	not listed	n/a	not listed	48 ▲	0.58 ▲	n/a ▼	not listed	n/a	not listed	n/a	not listed
Lloyd Williams	35	0.66 ▲	38 ▼	0.67 ▲	46 ▼	0.70 ▲	49 ▼	0.57 ▼	n/a ▼	not listed	n/a	not listed	n/a	not listed
Bruno Grollo	29 ▲	0.72 ▲	34 ▼	0.71 ▼	40 ▼	0.74 ▲	n/a ▼	not listed	n/a	not listed	n/a	not listed	n/a	not listed
John Grill	27 ▼	0.77 ▲	28 ▼	0.80 ▲	45 ▼	0.71 ▼	n/a ▼	not listed	n/a	not listed	n/a	not listed	n/a	not listed
Travers Duncan	n/a	not listed	n/a	not listed	49 ▲	0.63 ▲	n/a ▼	not listed	n/a	not listed	n/a	not listed	n/a	not listed
Stan Perron	20 ▼	1.05 ▲	15 ▲	1.50 ▲	12 ▲	2.10 ▲	14 ▼	1.80 ▼	16 ▼	1.60 ▼	17 ▼	1.54 ▼	15 ▲	
Bob Ingham	36 ▼	0.64	32 ▲	0.74 ▲	20 ▲	1.15 ▲	29 ▼	0.97 ▼	35 ▼	0.90 ▼	34 ▲	0.745 ▼		
Reg Rowe	n/a	not listed	n/a	not listed	43 ▲	0.73 ▲	43	0.67 ▼	n/a ▼	not listed ▼	39 ▲	0.675 ▲		
Graham Turner	n/a	not listed	n/a	not listed	n/a	not listed	36 ▲	0.72 ▲	49 ▼	0.57 ▼	45 ▲	0.575 ▲		
Bruce Gordon	26 ▼	0.79 ▲	40 ▼	0.65 ▼	50 ▼	0.62 ▼	40 ▲	0.70 ▲	41 ▼	0.72 ▲	46 ▼	0.57 ▼		
Marcus Blackmore	n/a	not listed	n/a	not listed	n/a	not listed	n/a	not listed	n/a	not listed	50 ▲	0.50 ▲		
Tim Roberts	n/a	not listed	n/a	not listed	n/a	not listed	n/a	not listed	n/a	not listed	n/a	not listed	49 ▲	
Chris Thomas	n/a	not listed	n/a	not listed	n/a	not listed	n/a	not listed	n/a	not listed	n/a	not listed	50 ▲	

^[note b] Paul Ramsay died in May 2014, five months after the 2014 list was published.
^[note c] Ian Norman died in May 2014, five months after the 2014 list was published.
^[note d] Bob Oatley died in January 2016, seven months after the 2015 list was published.
^[note e] Blair Parry-Okeden appeared on the list of Australians by net worth in 2016 only. She is a US-citizen and, despite living in Australia, is not eligible for admission on the list.

== See also ==
- Financial Review Rich List
- List of billionaires
- Lists of Australians
- List of Australian businesspersons
- List of wealthiest families
- Australia's Richest 250
