= Blackmores =

Australian public company

- Type: Subsidiary
- Industry: Health supplement
- Founded: 1938
- Founder: Maurice Blackmore
- Headquarters: Sydney, Australia
- Revenue: $650 million (2021/22)
- Net income: $57 million (2021/22)
- Number of employees: 1,200 (June 2022)
- Parent: Kirin Company (2023–present)
- Website: www.blackmores.com.au

Blackmores Limited is an Australian health supplements company founded in 1938 by naturopath Maurice Blackmore (1906–1977), when Blackmore opened the first health food shop in Australia in Brisbane. It manufactures an extensive range of vitamin, mineral and herbal supplements, sold in 17 markets across the Asia Pacific region.

In May 1985 it was listed on the Australian Securities Exchange. In 2017, Blackmores was inducted into the Queensland Business Leaders Hall of Fame.

In April 2023, Kirin launched a A$1.88 billion takeover bid for Blackmores. On 9 August it was announced that the purchase had been completed.
