= Mental Health Research Institute (Melbourne) =

- Established: 1956
- Location: Melbourne, Victoria, Australia
- Dissolved: 2012

The Mental Health Research Institute (MHRI) is a former Australian medical research institute that was focused upon improving the diagnosis, treatment and prevention of major mental disorders. The MHRI was active between 1956 and 2012, when it was merged with the Florey Neuroscience Institutes to form the Florey Institute of Neuroscience and Mental Health. Based in Melbourne, Victoria, the research efforts of the MHRI were focused on understanding schizophrenia, bipolar and major mood disorders, and Alzheimer's disease.

== History ==
The Mental Health Research Institute was founded in 1956 as part of the Victorian Health Department. At that time the Institute specialised in common mental disorders in the community, with a focus on risk factors, prevention and appropriate treatment. The building was located close to the original Royal Park Hospital in Parkville.

A working party established in 1983 recommended that a major expansion and re-organisation should take place. This resulted in more emphasis on neuroscience and the creation of a fully independent research organisation. In 1987 the Institute was incorporated in Victoria, and subsequently grew rapidly from an initial staff of three to over 100 staff prior to its merger. A modern neuroscientific research centre was completed in 1994 at a cost of A$5.5 million. Prior to its merger, the Institute occupied a purpose built facility that houses clinical and research laboratories with strong molecular and in-vivo capabilities.

Prior to its amalgamation, the MHRI was a fully accredited as an independent medical research institute by the National Health and Medical Research Council (NHMRC) and was affiliated with the University of Melbourne, the Royal Melbourne Hospital and Monash University. MHRI also promoted postgraduate psychiatry training through its association with the university sector. The Institute attracted competitive research funding from national and international sources and is internationally respected for its laboratory and clinical work. World leading researchers regularly visited MHRI as part of the Visiting Professors program.

In 2012, with the amalgamation of the Mental Health Research Institute and the Florey Neuroscience Institutes, the Florey Institute of Neuroscience and Mental Health was formed. Research at the merged Florey Institute includes psychiatric conditions such as depression, bipolar disorder and schizophrenia, and on neurodegenerative illnesses, particularly Alzheimer’s disease and Parkinson’s disease.
