= Fiona Geminder =

Australian businessperson

- Born: Fiona Pratt; Australia
- Education: Monash University
- Spouse: Raphael Geminder
- Children: 4
- Parents: Richard Pratt (father); Jeanne Pratt (mother)
- Relatives: Anthony Pratt (brother); Heloise Waislitz (sister)

Fiona Geminder is an Australian businesswoman, most notable for being associated with Visy and Pact Group Holdings. She has served as a director of the Kin Group of companies since 2017.

== Early life and education ==
Born Fiona Pratt, Geminder is a daughter of the late Richard and Jeanne Pratt. She is the sister of Anthony Pratt and Heloise Waislitz.

Geminder graduated with a Bachelor of Arts from Monash University in 1985; and completed her law degree at Monash University in 2008.

== Personal life ==
Geminder is married to Raphael Geminder, who is also notable as the Australian Financial Review's 90th richest businessman in Australia in 2021. Their daughter Georgia Geminder left a career of fashion modelling to start her own herbal toothpaste company.

=== Net worth ===
As of 2021, Geminder was the third richest woman in Australia, with a net worth of US$3.3 billion, she was listed as the 891st richest person in the world by Forbes magazine.

Year	Australian Financial Review Rich List		Forbes Australia's 50 Richest	
Year	Rank	Net worth (A$)	Rank	Net worth (US$)
2019	53	$957 million ▼		
2020	98 ▼	$957 million		
2021	90 ▲	$1.27 billion ▲		$3.30 billion
2022	92 ▼	$1.50 billion ▲		
2023	108 ▼	$1.30 billion ▼		$3.77 billion

Legend
Icon	Description
Steady	Has not changed from the previous year
▲	Has increased from the previous year
▼	Has decreased from the previous year

=== Philanthropy ===
Geminder is a director of the Pratt Foundation, the philanthropic organisation founded by her family.
