= Sam Tarascio =

Italian-born Australian businessman

- Born: Salvatore Tarascio; 22 June 1944 (age 81); Vizzini, Sicily, Italy
- Occupation: Businessman
- Known for: Westgate Logistics (since sold); Salta Properties
- Spouse: Christine Johnson
- Children: 3

Salvatore "Sam" Tarascio (born 22 June 1944) is an Italian-born Australian billionaire businessman. Tarascio owns a portfolio of commercial and industrial real estate across Melbourne, including a business park, two distribution sites, a large shopping mall and a market. In 1972 Tarascio founded Salta Properties, a privately owned company, after buying swampland and constructing a warehouse for Hoechst. Prior to entering the property market, Tarascio worked in pharmaceutical sales.

Salta Properties is managed by Tarascio's eldest son, also called Sam.

== Personal life ==
Born in Vizzini, Sicily, Tarascio emigrated to Australia in 1949, aged five years, and was raised by Sicilian migrant parents in the Melbourne suburb of Werribee. He is married to Christine Tarascio (née Johnson), and they have three children, Sam (b. 1975), Lisa (b. 1977), and David (b. 1979).

In 2018, Tarascio published an autobiography entitled, My Way.

Tarascio has interests in growing olives and extra virgin olive oil production, with a property located on the Mornington Peninsula. In c. 1930 in Vizzini, Tarascio's grandfather, Salvatore (Turi) Tarascio, commenced the family tradition of olive pressing.

=== Net worth ===
Year	Financial Review Rich List		Forbes Australia's 50 Richest	
Year	Rank	Net worth (A$)	Rank	Net worth (US$)
2015			42 ▲	$710 million ▲
2016			36 ▼	$735 million ▲
2017		$1.43 billion		
2018	51 ▲	$1.54 billion ▲		$1.00 billion
2019	46 ▲	$1.72 billion ▲	35 ▲	$1.22 billion ▲
2020	64 ▼	$1.53 billion ▼		
2021	75 ▼	$1.54 billion ▲		
2022	72 ▲	$1.69 billion ▲		
2023	89 ▼	$1.69 billion		
2024		$1.70 billion ▲		
2025	93	$1.75 billion ▲		

Legend
Icon	Description
Steady	Has not changed from the previous year
▲	Has increased from the previous year
▼	Has decreased from the previous year

== Published works ==
- Tarascio, Salvatore (2018). My way: Salvatore (Sam) Tarascio. Melbourne, VIC: Coretext Books. ISBN 9780646904085.
