= David Hains =

Australian businessman and horse breeder (1931-2023)

- Born: c. 1931; Australia
- Died: 22 January 2023 (age 92); Melbourne, Australia
- Education: University of Melbourne
- Occupations: Billionaire businessman; investor; horse breeder
- Board member of: Portland House Group
- Spouse: Helen Hains
- Children: 5

David Hains (c. 1931 – 22 January 2023) was an Australian businessman, engineer, and horse breeder. He was the founder and once CEO of Portland House Group, Australia’s largest private investments management firm and hedge fund. According to Forbes, Hains had at the time of his death a personal net-worth of around $2 billion, making him one of the richest person of Australia.

== Biography ==
Hains graduated from the University of Melbourne. He started his career as an engineer and in corporate restructuring. In the 1960s, he took a seven-year hiatus from his career to play golf.

Through his Portland House Group, Australia's biggest hedge fund that he managed with his children, Hains invested in equities, fixed interest, property and managed funds globally. In 1993, he sold an investment to Wheeling-Pittsburgh Steel for US$107 million.

Hains bred horses at his Kingston Park Stud in Merricks North, Victoria. His horses include Kingston Town, Lowan Star and Rose of Kingston.

== Personal life and death ==
Hains was married to Helen Hains and had five children. His son Richard Hains is a hedge fund manager and author of the novel Chameleon. Helen Hains died on 24 August 2017.

Hains died on 22 January 2023, at the age of 92.

=== Wealth rankings ===
In May 2019, The Australian Financial Review estimated Hains' net worth as A$2.90 billion as published in the Financial Review Rich List; and in January 2019 his net worth was estimated by Forbes Asia as US$1.90 billion as published in the list of Australia's 50 richest people. As of May 2021, Hains was one of ten Australians who had appeared in every Financial Review Rich List, or its predecessor, the BRW Rich 200, since it was first published in 1984, until his death in 2023. In 2023, the Financial Review, assessed the net worth of Hains' descendants, Stephen, Richard and Michael Hains and family, at A$2.88 billion.

Year	Financial Review Rich List		Forbes Australia's 50 richest	
Year	Rank	Net worth A$	Rank	Net worth US$
2011	7 ▼	2.30 billion ▲	9 ▲	2.00 billion ▲
2012	12 ▼	2.20 billion ▼	11 ▼	2.00 billion
2013	15 ▼	2.32 billion ▲	11	2.30 billion ▲
2014	12 ▲	2.39 billion ▲	12 ▼	2.10 billion ▼
2015	12	2.46 billion ▲	11 ▲	2.10 billion
2016	14 ▼	2.48 billion ▲	10 ▲	1.90 billion ▼
2017	16 ▼	2.55 billion ▲	19 ▼	
2018	21 ▼	2.69 billion ▲	19	
2019	23 ▼	2.90 billion ▲	19	1.90 billion
2020	28 ▼	2.93 billion ▲		
2021	31 ▼	2.89 billion ▼		
2022	36 ▼	2.90 billion ▲		
2023^{[note 1]}	38 ▼	2.88 billion ▼		

Legend
Icon	Description
Steady	Has not changed from the previous year
▲	Has increased from the previous year
▼	Has decreased from the previous year

== Notes ==
- ^[note 1]: Since 2023, the Australian Financial Review assessed the net worth of Hains' descendants, Stephen, Richard and Michael Hains and family.
