= Lindsay Fox =

Australian businessman (born 1937)

Lindsay Fox AC
- Born: Lindsay Edward Fox; 19 April 1937 (age 89); Sydney, New South Wales, Australia
- Education: Melbourne High School
- Occupation: Businessman
- Years active: 1956–present
- Organization: Linfox / Fox Holdings
- Spouse: Paula Grace Peele (m. 1959)
- Children: 6

Lindsay Edward Fox AC (born 19 April 1937) is an Australian businessman. In 1956, Fox founded the Australian logistics company Linfox, where as of 2015 he serves as non-executive chairman.

== Early life ==
Fox was born on 19 April 1937, in Sydney, and was brought up in Prahran, a suburb of Melbourne. He attended Melbourne High School, but was asked to leave during Year 10, at age 16, due to his lack of academic interest. He started working as a truck driver and was able to use this as a springboard to found Linfox.

=== Football career ===
Lindsay Fox
Personal information
Australian rules football career
Personal information
- Debut: Round 2, 2 May 1959, St Kilda vs. Essendon, at Windy Hill
- Height: 184 cm (6 ft 0 in)
- Weight: 84 kg (185 lb)
- Position: Ruckman
Playing career^{1}
| Years | Club | Games (Goals) |
| 1959–1961 | St Kilda | 20 (3) |
| Total | | 20 (3) |
- ^{1} Playing statistics correct to the end of 1962.

For many of his earlier years, Fox played Australian rules football with moderate success. After playing in the St Kilda Football Club's thirds side (which he captained), Fox went to Golden Point Football Club in the Ballarat Football League then made his Victorian Football League debut for St Kilda in 1960. He did not think much of his footballing abilities, but as a ruckman he went on to play 20 games (for 3 goals) from 1959 to 1961. Following his stint in the VFL, he went to the Victorian Football Association (VFA), playing, first, for Moorabbin, where he won a premiership, then for Brighton-Caulfield after Moorabbin was expelled from the VFA.

He became the president of the St Kilda Football Club in 1979.

== Business interests ==
Fox started Linfox in 1956 with one truck.

Fox also took ownership of Melbourne's Luna Park in late 2005. In 2006, he made an unsuccessful bid for the development of the neighboring Triangle Site on St Kilda's foreshore. The property was subsequently destroyed by fire.

Fox has been involved with a number of high-profile disputes with the Government relating to his property development activities. In the late 1990s, he attempted to claim the public beach area in front of his holiday home as a private helipad for his helicopter and to build a high security compound for himself and his family. This development was rejected by the Victorian Planning Minister. However he has also been able to use his government contacts to gain favorable treatment by being granted permission to land his helicopter near his Portsea home on crown land.

Fox has been in dispute with the local council of his Toorak mansion by attempting to have the heritage listing that applies to all homes in the street removed from his property. His son's Toorak home was destroyed by fire.

== Awards and recognition ==
Fox was appointed an Officer of the Order of Australia in the Australia Day Honours' List of 1992, in recognition of service to the transport industry and to the community. In 2001, he was awarded the Centenary Medal.

In 2008, Fox was appointed a Companion of the Order of Australia (AC), in recognition of his continued service to the transport and logistics industries, to business through the development and promotion of youth traineeships, and to the community through a range of philanthropic endeavours.

In April 2022, it was announced that the new gallery, part of the National Gallery of Victoria (NGV) would be named The Fox: NGV Contemporary, in recognition of a $100 million donation from the Foxes.

== Personal life ==
Fox married Paula Grace Peele (now Paula Fox) in 1959. They had six children, all born before he was 30 years old.

In 2004, on the ABC TV George Negus Tonight program, Fox's work ethic and business savviness was profiled. When asked by George Negus how he describes himself politically, Fox replied: "I guess, Labor think I'm Liberal, Liberal think I'm Labor, the Catholics think I'm Protestant, the Protestants think I'm Catholic. The local rabbi delivers me matzah. So I guess, bottom line, I'm an Australian". Fox went on to say: "I, traditionally, probably, was brought up in a working-class family where the old man would turn in his grave if he'd thought I'd have voted Liberal. But I must admit, from probably 25 up to the last election, I would have voted Liberal and supported Liberal quite strongly. But I was completely disillusioned by the lack of statesmanship with our Prime Minister with the Ansett debacle. He had an opportunity to be a statesman. Instead he took on a political role and as a result of that, the demise of Ansett came about".

Following the suicide of his son Michael in 1991, Fox advised the Federal and Victorian governments on youth suicide and was appointed to the board of the National Advisory Council on Suicide Prevention. In 1992 he was named "Victorian Father of the Year". In an interview with George Negus in August 2004, Fox spoke of the loss of his son: "Well, life is about being up and being down and being able to get up again. And in my walks of life, I guess I thought I was invincible till one of my sons committed suicide. And at that point of time, I knew I wasn't invincible ... I'd give up everything if we could get Michael back. He's got a special place in each and every one of the hearts of our family and he'll always be there and he'll never grow old."

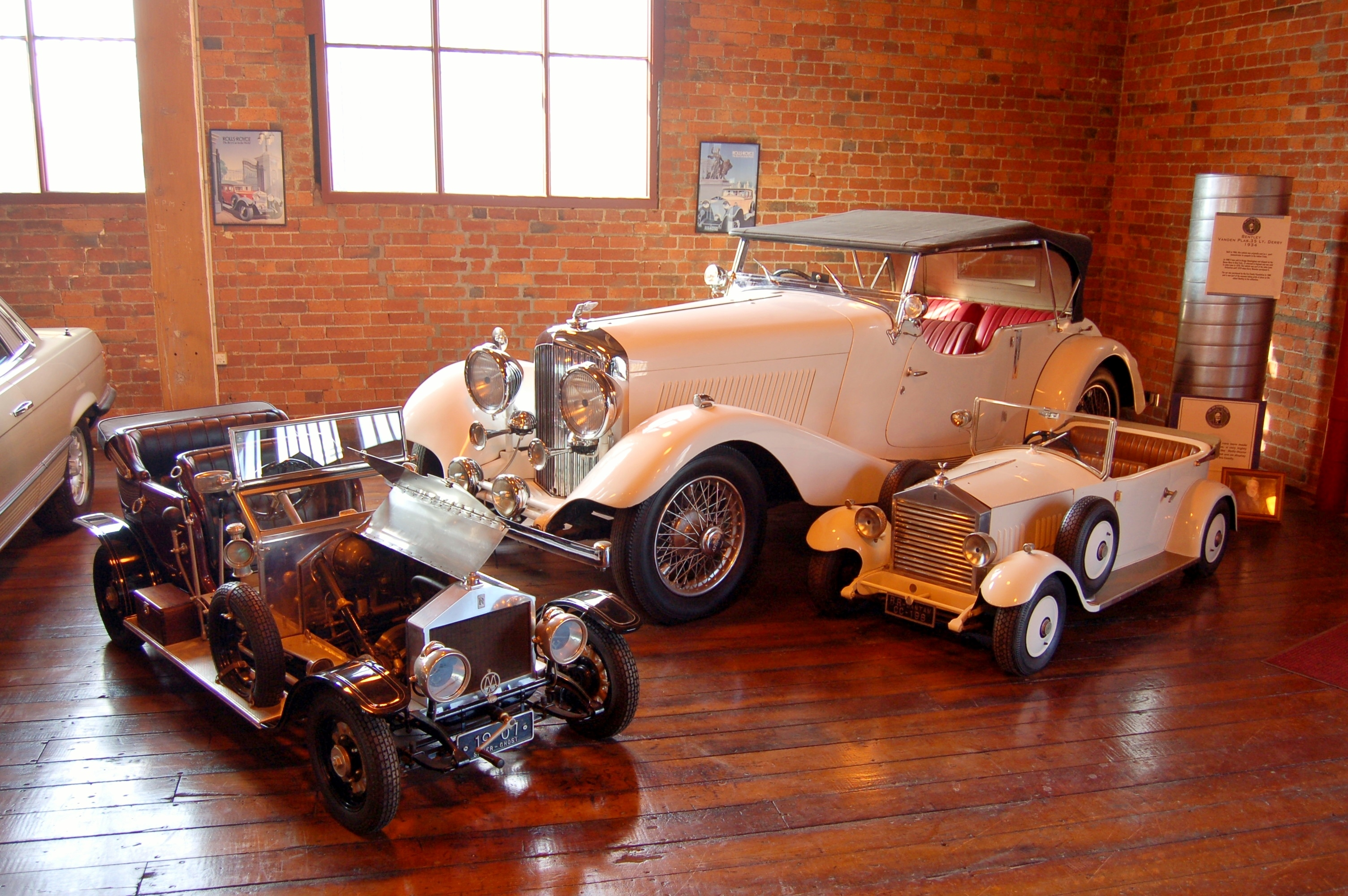
Some of the cars in the Fox Classic Car Collection

Fox has a collection of over 50 cars. The collection is displayed to the public at the Fox Classic Car Museum in Docklands. The collection and museum is managed by the Fox Family Trust.

=== Net worth ===
In 2019, the Australian Financial Review assessed Fox's net worth at A$3.72 billion, listed on the 2020 Rich List. As of May 2025, his net worth was assessed at A$5.73 billion, and Fox was one of seven living Australians who have appeared in every Financial Review Rich List, or its predecessor, the BRW Rich 200, since it was first published in 1984.

In 2019, Forbes assessed his net worth at US$3.50 billion, on the list of Australia's 50 richest people.

| Year | Financial Review Rich List | | Forbes Australia's 50 Richest | |
| Year | Rank | Net worth A$ | Rank | Net worth US$ |
|---|---|---|---|---|
| 2011 | 17 ▲ | $2.05 billion ▲ | 11 ▼ | $1.70 billion ▲ |
| 2012 | 18 ▲ | $2.00 billion ▼ | 14 ▼ | $1.60 billion ▼ |
| 2013 | 19 ▼ | $1.90 billion ▼ | 14 | $1.95 billion ▲ |
| 2014 | 15 ▲ | $2.12 billion ▲ | 11 ▲ | $2.20 billion ▲ |
| 2015 | 15 | $2.24 billion ▲ | 9 ▲ | $2.90 billion ▲ |
| 2016 | 13 ▲ | $2.49 billion ▲ | | |
| 2017 | 13 | $2.91 billion ▲ | | |
| 2018 | 17 ▼ | $3.56 billion ▲ | | $3.50 billion |
| 2019 | 31 ▼ | $3.31 billion ▼ | 10 ▼ | $3.50 billion |
| 2020 | 23 ▲ | $3.72 billion ▲ | | |
| 2021 | 25 ▼ | $4.01 billion ▲ | | |
| 2022 | 24 ▲ | $4.20 billion ▲ | | |
| 2023 | 23 ▲ | $4.35 billion ▲ | | |
| 2024 | 21 ▲ | $5.69 billion ▲ | | |
| 2025 | 26 ▼ | $5.73 billion ▲ | | |

Legend
| Icon | Description |
|---|---|
| Steady | Has not changed from the previous year |
| ▲ | Has increased from the previous year |
| ▼ | Has decreased from the previous year |
