= Mike Cannon-Brookes =

Australian businessman (born 1979)

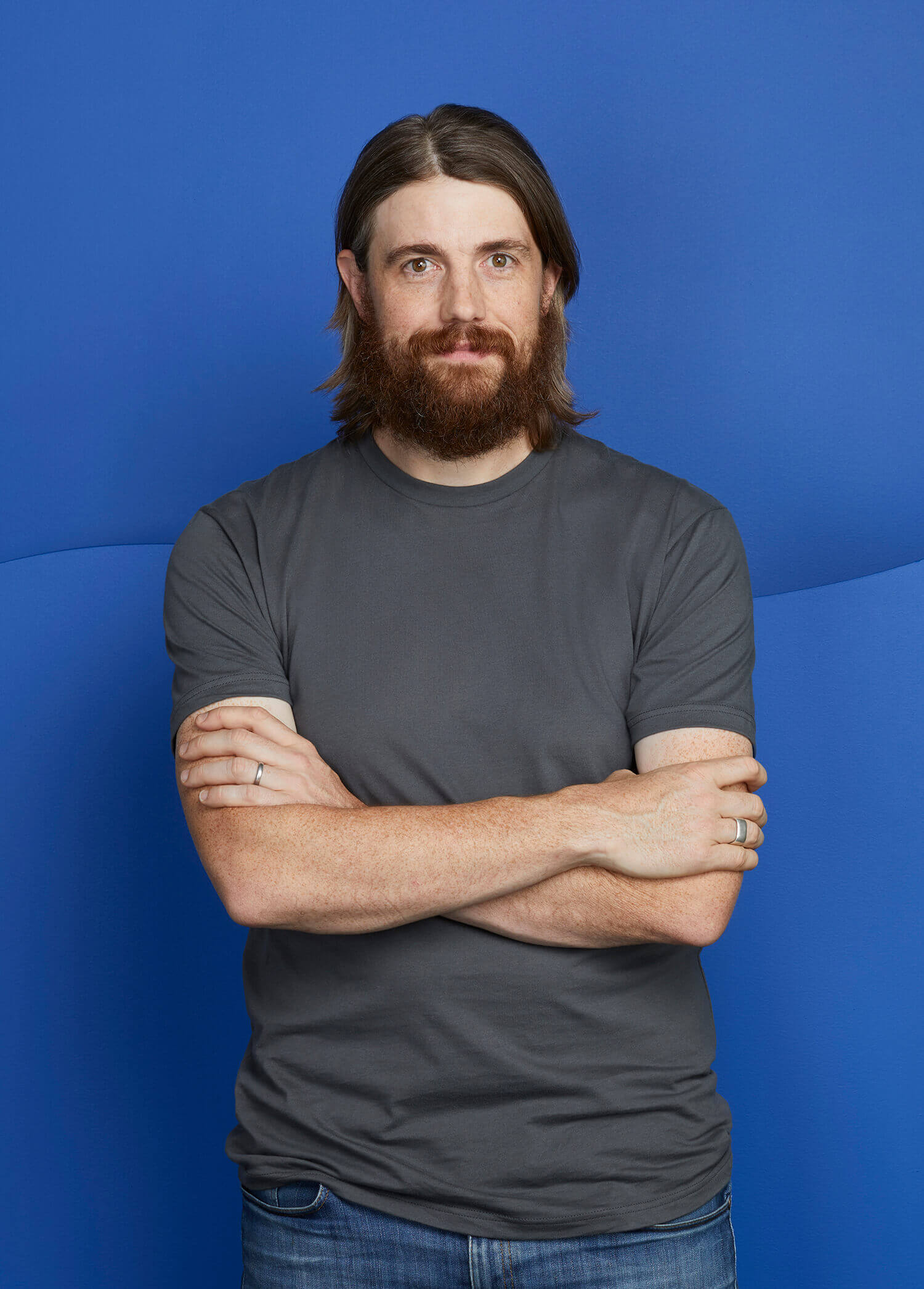
- Cannon-Brookes in 2018
- Born: 17 November 1979 (age 47); New Haven, Connecticut, U.S.
- Education: University of New South Wales
- Occupation: CEO of Atlassian
- Known for: Co-founding Atlassian
- Board member of: Atlassian
- Spouse: Annie Todd (m. 2010; sep. 2023)
- Children: 4
- Website: atlassian.com

Michael Cannon-Brookes (born 17 November 1979) is an Australian billionaire and businessman who is the co-founder and chief executive officer of the software company Atlassian, a Forbes Global 2000 company.

Since 2018, he has been involved in the Australia-Asia Power Link, a huge electricity infrastructure project to be developed in the Northern Territory by Sun Cable in a collaboration with the businessman Twiggy Forrest.

== Early life and education ==
Michael Cannon-Brookes was born on 17 November 1979 in Connecticut, US. The son of a British global banking executive, also named Mike, and his wife Helen, he is the youngest of three siblings, with two sisters. His family relocated to Taiwan when he was six months old, and to Hong Kong when he was three; he later attended boarding school in England. He attended Cranbrook School in Sydney, and graduated from the University of New South Wales with a bachelor's degree in information systems on a UNSW co-op scholarship.

== Career ==
Before founding Atlassian, Cannon-Brookes co-founded an internet bookmark management tool called The Bookmark Box with his university classmate Niki Scevak. The Bookmark Box was sold to Blink.com in 2000.

Cannon-Brookes co-founded Atlassian, a collaboration software company, of which he is CEO. He and Scott Farquhar started the company in 2002, shortly after graduating from university, funding it with credit cards. They have said they founded Atlassian with the aim of earning the then-typical graduate starting salary of A$48,000 at the big corporations without having to work for someone else.

Their first major Atlassian product was Jira, a bug tracking, issue tracking and project-tracking software. They decided to forgo the expense of hiring sales people, and instead spent their time and money on building a good product and selling it at a more affordable price via the Atlassian website. As of 2016, the company still did not have a traditional sales force, investing instead in research and development.

In 2005, they opened an office in New York, where most of their clients were. Later in 2005 they moved the U.S. office to San Francisco, which had a much larger pool of relevant technical talent.

Their first external funding for Atlassian was a US$60 million round from Accel in 2010. In 2014, they redomiciled the company to the UK, in advance of an initial public offering (IPO).

Atlassian made its debut on the Nasdaq stock exchange in December 2015, with a market capitalisation of $4.37 billion. The IPO made Cannon-Brookes and Farquhar Australia's first tech startup billionaires and household names in Australia.

Cannon-Brookes and Farquhar redomiciled Atlassian to the United States in 2022. Since September 2024, Cannon-Brookes is the sole CEO of the company after Farquhar stepped down as co-CEO. As of 2024, he owns approximately 20% of Atlassian, with super-voting shares.

== Other activities ==
Cannon-Brookes started Grok Ventures in 2016 as a family office. He is a major investor in green projects through his private investing vehicle. In October 2021, he pledged to donate and invest $1.5 billion on climate projects by 2030 to reinforce the COP26 goal of limiting global warming to 1.5 degrees above pre-industrial levels. He also formed a climate fund called Boundless Earth in 2022.

Cannon-Brookes is an adjunct professor at the University of New South Wales' School of Computer Science and Engineering. He is also the chairman of Blackbird Ventures, a venture capital firm.

In September 2020, it was revealed that Cannon-Brookes was among 35,000 Australians on a Chinese Government "Overseas Key Individuals Database" of prominent international individuals of interest for China.

In March 2022, Cannon-Brookes and the billionaire Andrew Forrest invested in the Sun Cable project, to build a solar and battery farm 12,000 hectares (120 km^{2}) in size at Powell Creek, Northern Territory, and a power-cable to link it to Singapore (via Indonesia) by way of Australia at Murrumujuk beach. In January 2023, Sun Cable went into administration owing to disagreements between Cannon-Brookes and Forrest, and in May 2023, Grok Ventures outbid Forrest and others to buy the liquidated company.

In 2022, Cannon-Brookes became the largest shareholder of the Australian publicly listed energy company AGL, Australia's largest greenhouse gas emitter, in a move to force the company to decarbonise more quickly.

Cannon-Brookes also appears in the directory of Peter Thiel's Dialog organization.

=== Sports ===
In December 2020, Cannon-Brookes bought a minority stake in NBA team Utah Jazz, along with Qualtrics co-founder Ryan Smith. In November 2021, he bought a one-third share of Blackcourt League Investments, which owns 75% of the Australian Rugby League team, the South Sydney Rabbitohs.

== Personal life ==
Cannon-Brookes married Annie Todd, an American fashion designer, in 2010; they have four children together. The couple first met at a Qantas lounge while flying from Sydney to San Francisco. Cannon-Brookes and Todd lived in Sydney's eastern suburbs in Centennial Park. In 2018 they bought Fairwater, Australia's most expensive house for approximately A$100 million, next door to Scott Farquhar's A$71 million Point Piper harbourside mansion, Elaine. Cannon-Brookes also acquired the 1923-built heritage residence Verona, designed by architect Leslie Wilkinson and located in Double Bay, for A$17 million. The house previously belonged to New Zealand philanthropist Pat Goodman. Prior to that, in 2016, Cannon-Brookes had bought the A$7.05 million SeaDragon house, built in 1936, also designed by Wilkinson and updated by architect Luigi Rosselli. His Centennial Park home sold for A$16.5 million. In 2019 he purchased a house near Fairwater for A$12 million. He owns a Bombardier Global 7500 jet. Cannon-Brookes separated from his wife Annie in July 2023.

=== Recognition ===
Cannon-Brookes and Farquhar were recognised as Ernst & Young's 2006 Australian Entrepreneur of the Year. He is a member of The Forum of Young Global Leaders. In 2023, he was recognised as a "Time100 climate person".

== Net worth ==
In 2016, Forbes listed him and his wife among Australia's 50 richest people with an estimated net worth of US$1.69 billion; BRW Rich 200 at A$2.00 billion; and the Sunday Times Rich List at £906 million. Following his separation from Annie Cannon-Brookes, his net worth was reported by the Australian Financial Review in the 2025 Rich List at A$12.18 billion. In 2021, prior to his separation, his joint net worth was assessed at US$13.7 billion by Forbes and at US$11.2 billion by Bloomberg.

Year	BRW Rich 200		Forbes Australia's 50 Richest		Sunday Times Rich List	
Year	Rank	Net worth (A$)	Rank	Net worth (US$)	Rank	Net worth (£)
2013	190 ▲	$0.25 billion ▲	n/a	not listed		
2014	35 ▲	$1.07 billion ▲	n/a	not listed		
2015	42 ▼	$1.14 billion ▲	25 ▲	$1.10 billion ▲		
2016	18 ▲	$2.00 billion ▲	14 ▲	$1.69 billion ▲		£906 million ▲
2017	17 ▲	$2.51 billion ▲	10 ▲	$3.40 billion ▲		
2018	12 ▲	$5.16 billion ▲	5 ▲			
2019	6 ▲	$9.63 billion ▲	5	$6.40 billion ▲		
2020	5 ▲	$16.93 billion ▲				
2021	3 ▲	$20.18 billion ▲		$13.70 billion ▲		
2022	3	$27.80 billion ▲				
2023	6 ▼	$19.01 billion ▼				
2024	3 ▲	$24.38 billion ▲				
2025^{[note 1]}	13 ▼	$12.18 billion ▼				

Legend
Icon	Description
Steady	Has not changed from the previous year
▲	Has increased from the previous year
▼	Has decreased from the previous year

== See also ==
- List of NRL club owners

== Notes ==
- ^1: Net worth was aggregated with Annie Cannon-Brookes, prior to 2025.
