= Anthony Pratt =

Australian businessman (born 1960)

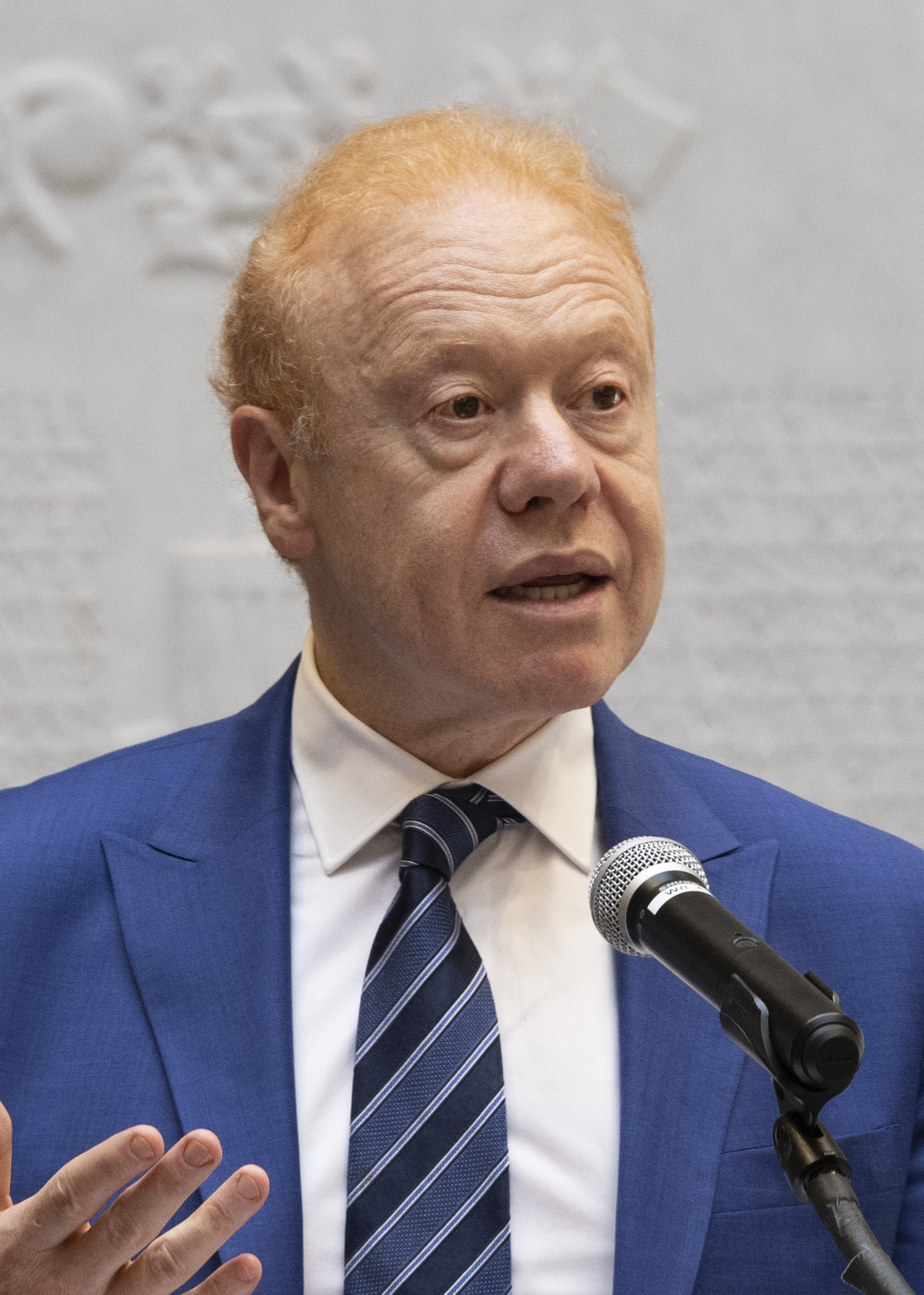
- Pratt in 2019
- Born: 11 April 1960 (age 66); Melbourne, Victoria, Australia
- Education: Monash University
- Title: Chairman, Visy
- Board member of: Visy; Pratt Industries
- Partner: Claudine Revere
- Children: 2
- Parents: Richard Pratt (father); Jeanne Pratt (mother)
- Relatives: Heloise Waislitz (sister); Fiona Geminder (sister)

Anthony Joseph Pratt (born 11 April 1960) is an American-based Australian businessman. He is the executive chairman of Pratt Industries, the largest individually-owned manufacturing company in America. Pratt is also the chairman of Visy, the Australian packaging company started by his grandfather Leon Pratt in 1948. Pratt and his family's net worth was assessed at A$30 billion (US$20 billion) in the annual list compiled by The Australian newspaper.

== Early life and education ==
Pratt was born in Melbourne, Victoria on April 11, 1960, to Richard Pratt (né Przecicki) and Jeanne Pratt AC, both Polish-Jewish immigrants. His siblings are Heloise Waislitz and Fiona Geminder.

Pratt grew up in the inner Melbourne suburb of Kew. He was interviewed by The Australian Jewish News on the occasion of his bar mitzvah, which reported his pledge to donate the proceeds towards the construction of a nachala (estate) in his name in Kerem Maharal, Israel. Pratt attended Mount Scopus Memorial College in Burwood. He graduated from Monash University, Melbourne, with a Bachelor of Economics (Hons) in 1982. He was part of the Young Leadership Division of the United Israel Appeal in the 1980s, serving as co-chair of its fundraising committee.

== Business career ==
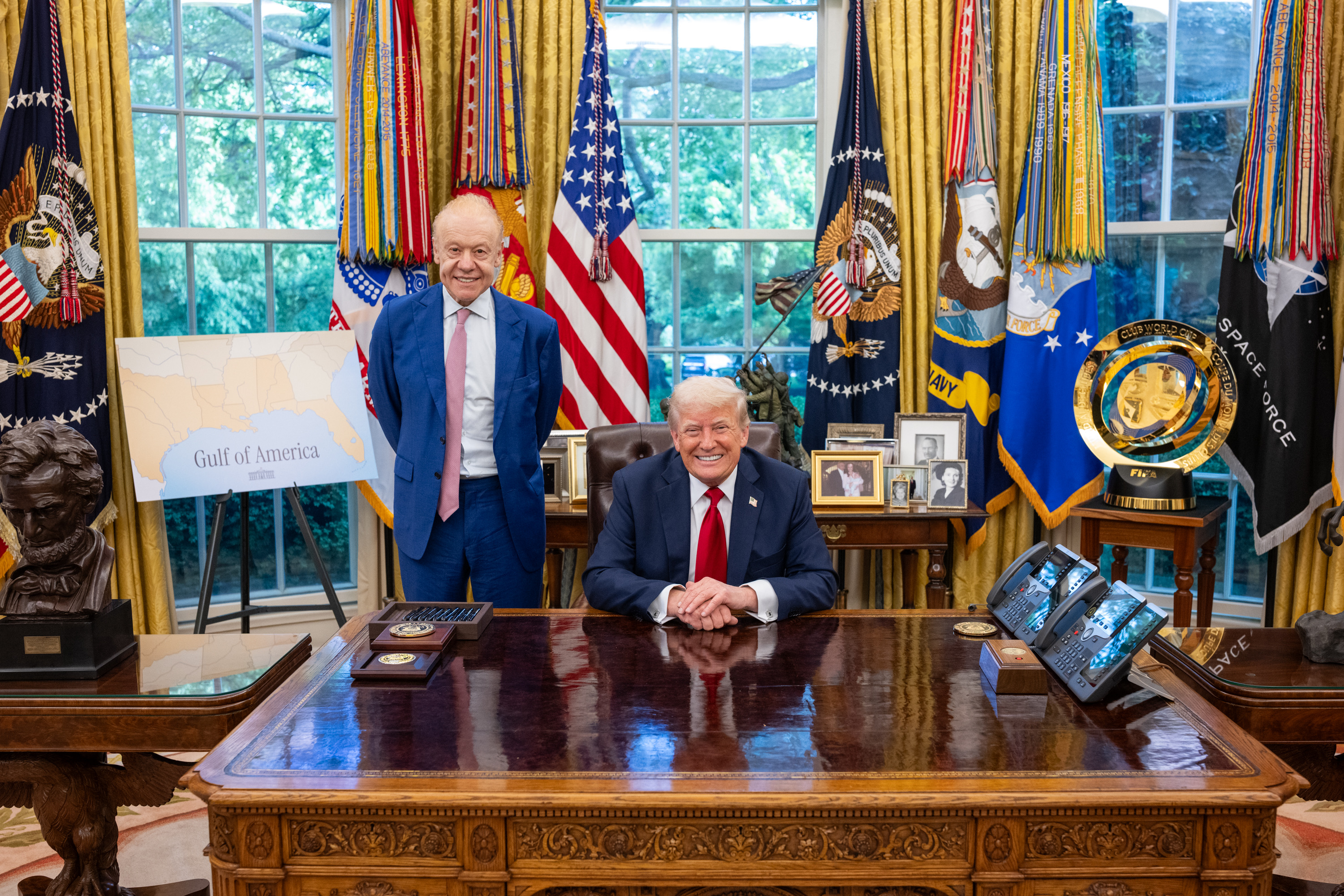
Anthony Pratt pledged to invest $5b in American manufacturing during an April 2025 White House meeting with President Trump

Pratt joined McKinsey & Company in 1982. Later, he joined his family's company Visy, initially as joint general manager of the board, before becoming deputy chairman in 1988.

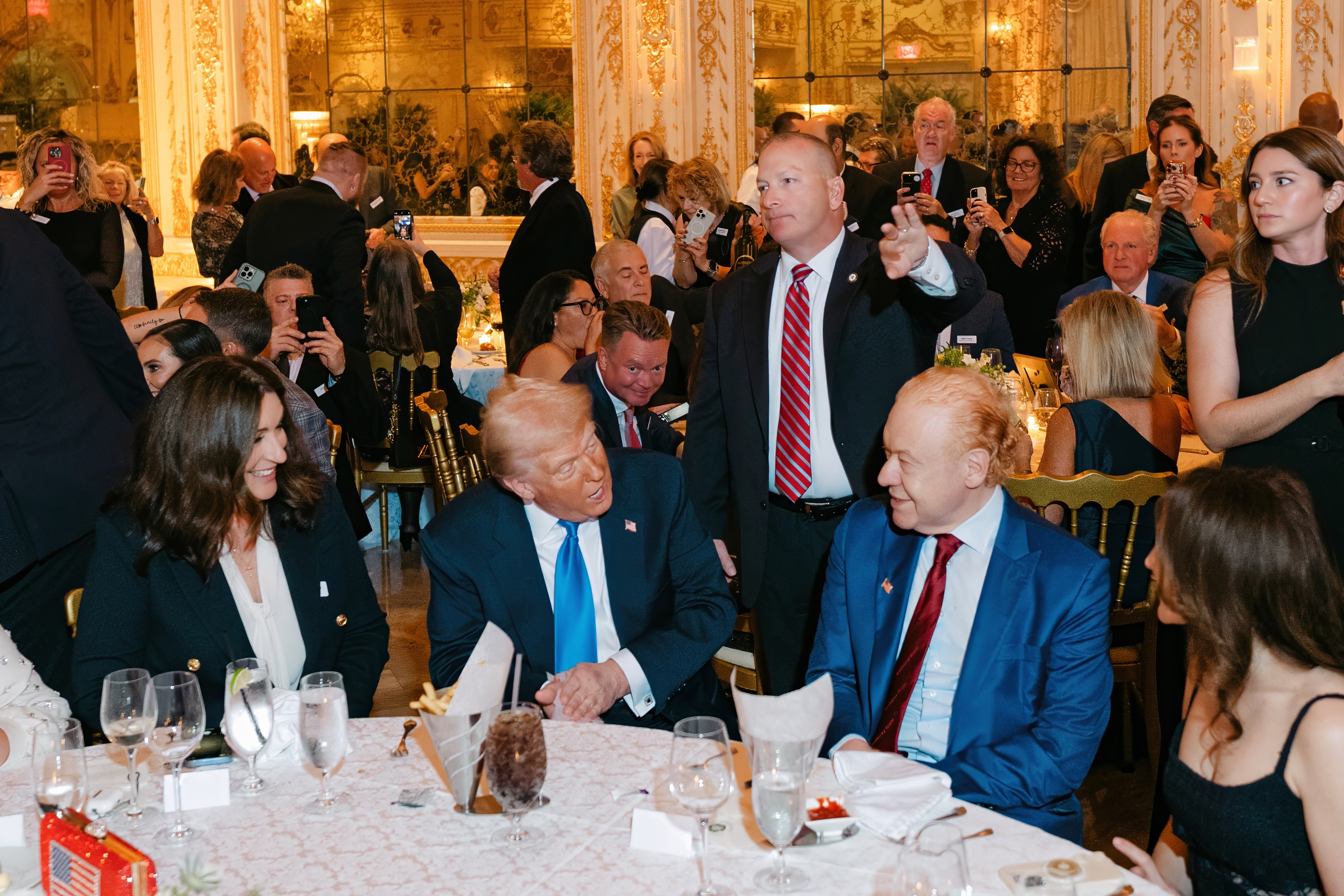
President Trump and Anthony Pratt at Mar-a-Lago

Three years later, he moved to the United States to lead the company's expansion. Over the next 15 years, Pratt Industries grew 15-fold in sales and earnings, through greenfield initiatives and the acquisition of several corrugated manufacturing companies that now form the heart of Pratt Industries. Company revenues grew from US$100 million in 1991 to US$3 billion in 2016.

Following his father's death in 2009, Pratt returned to Australia to take over as executive chairman of Visy, a role his father had held for 30 years.

In September 2013, Pratt was elected an executive member of the Australia-Japan Business Cooperation Committee, a group dedicated for more than 50 years to strengthening ties between the two countries. In October 2013, Prime Minister Tony Abbott invited Pratt on an official visit to Indonesia – the first overseas trip by the incoming leader. Later that month, Pratt announced that former advisor to President Obama and the outgoing US Ambassador to Australia, Jeffrey Bleich, would join the Pratt Group advisory board.

In 2016, Pratt opened a 100% recycled paper mill in Valpairaiso, IN, adding about US$1 billion to his wealth. It was officially opened by then-Governor Mike Pence. In March 2017, Pratt opened his 68th factory, a box-making plant, with Wisconsin governor Scott Walker in Beloit. On 4 May 2017, Pratt pledged to invest A$2 billion to create 5,000 high-paying manufacturing jobs over 10 years mainly in the Midwest. In August 2017, Pratt made a further investment pledge of A$2 billion in Visy Australia to create 5,000 Australian manufacturing jobs.

In 2017, Pratt launched the Superfund Roundtable in partnership with the Australian Financial Review. The annual event attracts some of the nation's leading business executives and financiers and is aimed at increasing superfund lending to Australian businesses to drive economic growth and create jobs.

Since taking over the company, Pratt has taken a strong interest in sustainable agriculture, food security, and water issues, stating that his motivation is that 70% of his Australian customers are in the food and beverage sector. In October 2016, Pratt was the founding sponsor of The Wall Street Journal's inaugural U.S.-based Global Food Forum. In his opening remarks, Pratt called on food industry leaders to start a national conversation about how to double the size of the American food industry to US$1.8 trillion and thereby create millions of new jobs under the slogan "Export Food, Not Jobs". At subsequent Global Food Forum dinners during 2017 in Los Angeles and Chicago, Pratt continued to advocate for increased U.S. food exports.

In 2020, Pratt completed one of the biggest Australian manufacturing deals ever - buying the Australian assets of Owens Illinois for A$1 billion to become Australia's largest glass bottle manufacturer. In February 2021, Pratt pledged to invest an additional A$2 billion to increase the recycled content of Australian glass bottles from 30% to 70% and to build more clean energy plants as part of the goal to halve landfills and double the recycled content of manufactured products.

In July 2021, Pratt announced his largest-ever deal in the US – a new US$500 million paper mill in Henderson, Kentucky. Upon completion it will mean Pratt has built six of the last eight paper mills in the US - all 100% recycled. Pratt's two companies now employ 17,000 in America and Australia. The Jerusalem Post named him 35th on its list of the world's 50 "Most Influential Jews" of 2021. In November 2021, Pratt and Pennsylvania governor Tom Wolf opened Pratt's new A$150 million state-of-the-art box factory in Carlisle.

Pratt also welcomed two other US governors to his factories in the fall of 2022. In September, Louisiana governor John Bel Edwards visited Pratt's 100% recycled paper mill in Shreveport. A few weeks later, Kansas governor Laura Kelly officially opened his new US$200m corrugated box factory in Wichita.

Pratt attended the national Jobs and Skills Summit in September 2022 in Australia. In October 2022, he broke ground on his Australian company's largest ever single investment - a A$500m glass recycling factory outside Brisbane, Queensland.

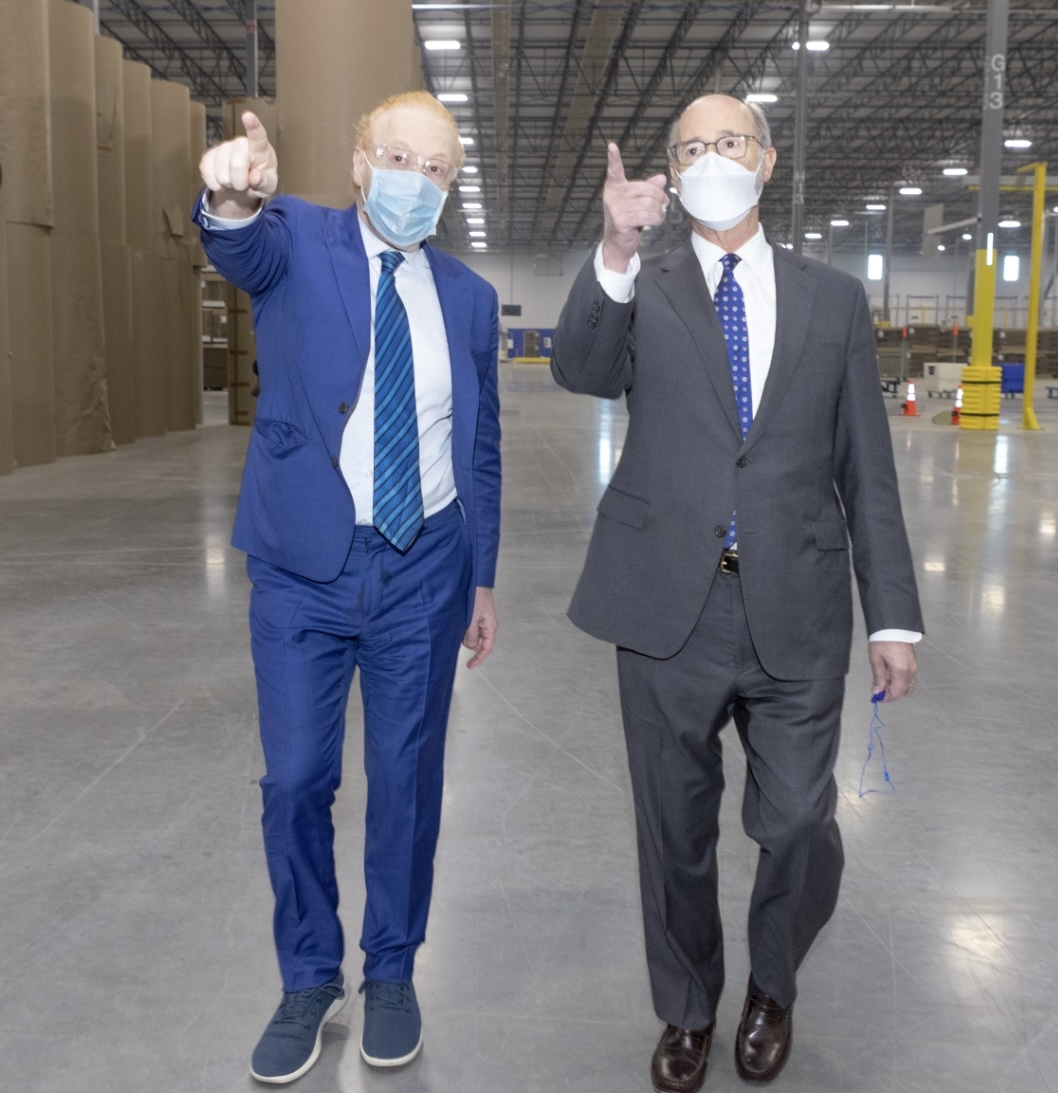
Anthony Pratt and Pennsylvania's Governor Tom Wolf tour Pratt's new $150m state-of-the-art box factory in Carlisle.

In November, 2022, Pratt pledged to invest A$5 billion, in an agreement made with Caroline Kennedy, the US Ambassador to Australia, in recycling and clean energy infrastructure to create 5,000 well-paying, green-collar American manufacturing jobs over the next 10 years. Since making that pledge, Pratt has spent and committed hundreds of millions of dollars on new factories.

In September 2023 Pratt opened a US$700 million mill in Henderson, for the manufacture of recycled paper. The Governor of Kentucky, Andy Beshear, granted Pratt with the honorary title of Kentucky Colonel in acknowledgment of Pratt's contribution to the State of Kentucky. That same month Pratt announced to the Governor of Pennsylvania, Josh Shapiro, that he would invest another US$500 million and create hundreds of jobs in Pennsylvania over the next ten years.

The US$5 billion pledge to Kennedy also included the construction of the most advanced corrugated box factory in the United States. The US$200 million manufacturing plant, which was opened by Georgia governor Brian Kemp in April 2024, produces more than one million boxes every day.

In late 2023, Pratt's Australian company, Visy, opened an A$175 million factory in Brisbane, Queensland; and a new recycled can factory, located at Smithfield, Sydney, that can process up to 1.2 billion cans every year. In February 2024, Visy opened its upgraded glass sorting plant in Melbourne which overnight doubled its recycling capacity to 200,000 tonnes (220,000 short tons) and enabled the company to produce bottles and jars with 70% recycled content. In September 2024, Pratt and New South Wales Premier Chris Minns opened Australia's most energy-efficient glass recycling factory in Sydney. The A$150 million plant is Australia's first oxygen-only fuelled furnace and can produce more than two million recycled glass containers every day.

Then, in December 2025, US Secretary of Agriculture Brooke Rollins joined Pratt in opening his new 500,000 sq ft box factory in Warner Robbins, GA.

In May 2026, award-winning Australian writer Jane Cadzow profiled Pratt in a lengthy article in the country's leading newspaper, the Sydney Morning Herald.

In the article, Australian businessman Ahsok Jacob, executive chairman of asset management firm Ellerston Capital, summed up Pratt's achievements in America. "This is probably the most successful US expansion by any Australian company, ever," he said. "It's one of the best manufacturing businesses that you will see anywhere in the world. It just relentlessly doubles in size every five to six years."

In October 2026, the independent Australian financial research firm Kalkine described Pratt’s business career as “a masterclass in modern industrial management, demonstrating how traditional manufacturing can achieve world-class profitability and scale through technological innovation and environmental circularity.”

=== Relationship with politicians and royalty ===
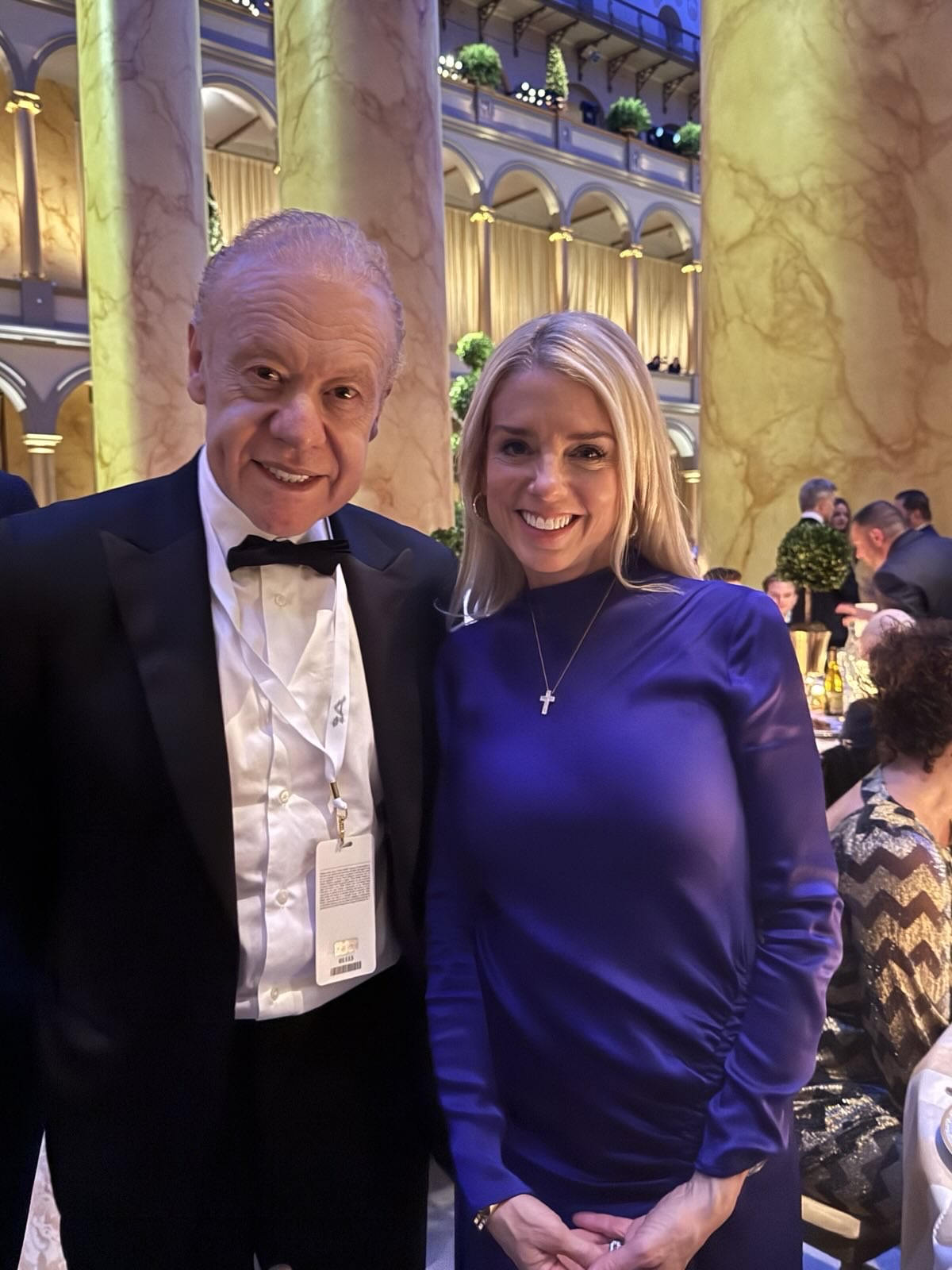
Pratt with Attorney General Pam Bondi at a black tie dinner celebrating President Trump's inauguration.

When Donald Trump was elected as US president in 2017, Pratt became a paying member of Trump's Florida Mar-a-Lago resort club and pledged to invest another US$2 billion in American manufacturing jobs. Over the next few years, he visited Mar-a-Lago about ten times, and got to know Trump. In 2018, he visited the White House when Australia's prime minister, Malcolm Turnbull, was present. In 2019, Trump publicly called Pratt a friend and praised him for funding a Pratt Industries plant in Wapakoneta, Ohio. Pratt privately stated that he associated with Trump to advance his own business interests. When Pratt's private comments were revealed in the media, Trump responded by calling Pratt "a red haired weirdo from Australia" and denying talking to him about submarines.

In 2017, Pratt attended Vice President Mike Pence's business roundtable at the Vice President's official residence in Washington D.C.

Sources have alleged that in the months after leaving office, Trump discussed classified aspects of U.S. nuclear submarines ("the supposed exact number of nuclear warheads they routinely carry, and exactly how close they supposedly can get to a Russian submarine without being detected") with Pratt, and that Pratt then shared the information with up to 45 other people "including six journalists, 11 of his company's employees, 10 Australian officials, and three former Australian prime ministers", potentially endangering the U.S. nuclear fleet. Brian Butler, a 20-year-employee of Mar-a-Lago, told federal investigators from Jack Smith's office about the conversation.

As of 2023, Pratt had made payments to Prince Charles and given regular consultancy payments to two former Australian prime ministers, Tony Abbott and Paul Keating.

In 2024, Pratt donated US$15.1 million in support of Trump, including US$14 million to the Make America Great Again, Inc, super PAC and a further US$1.1 million donation to Trump's inaugural fund. This placed Pratt in the top five donors to Trump's campaign - along with Elon Musk, Timothy Mellon, Miriam Adelson and Linda McMahon.

On April 30, 2025, Pratt attended the "Invest in America" summit hosted by President Trump at the White House. He had earlier announced a $5 billion investment pledge to create 5,000 new manufacturing jobs in Ohio, Michigan, Pennsylvania, and Arizona. Pratt was among a select group of senior business leaders, including Nvidia CEO, Jensen Huang, IBM CEO, Arvind Krishna, and Chairman of Softbank, Masayoshi Son. Members of Trump's Cabinet were also present, including Commerce Secretary Howard Lutnick. Trump recognized Pratt's investment during a White House press conference. Pratt Industries is the largest individually owned manufacturing company in America and employs one out of every thousand American manufacturing workers.

On November 15, 2025, President Trump attended the annual Pratt Industries customer party at Mar-a-Lago.

=== Net worth ===
Pratt first appeared on the Financial Review (AFR) Rich List in 2009 (then published as the BRW Rich 200), following the death of his father earlier that year. He debuted as the richest person in Australia with a net worth of A$4.3 billion. In subsequent years, his wealth increased; however, those with interests in the then rapidly growing Australian resources sector came to dominate the list. Since 2009, the AFR Rich List and the Forbes list of Australia's 50 Richest People generally assessed Pratt's net worth on a similar basis, aggregated with his family. However, in 2015, Forbes reported the wealth of Pratt separate to the net worth of his two sisters, Fiona Geminder and Heloise Waislitz.

In 2022, The Australian newspaper assessed his worth at A$27.7 billion. Several months earlier, in February 2021, Bloomberg News ranked him seventh in the list of the world's richest people to have made their fortunes from green industries. They valued his personal worth at US$12 billion. In the 2025 Rich List, the Financial Review assessed his net worth at A$25.84 billion, assessing his sisters' wealth independently.

In 2016, the Australian Taxation Office revealed that despite more than A$2.5 billion in revenue in 2013–14, Pratt Consolidated Holdings had not paid any taxes.

Year	Financial Review Rich List		Forbes Australia's 50 Richest	
Year	Rank	Net worth A$	Rank	Net worth US$
2009	1 ▲	$4.30 billion ▲		
2010	2 ▼	$4.60 billion ▲		
2011	4 ▼	$5.18 billion ▲	7 ▲	$2.70 billion ▲
2012	5 ▼	$5.45 billion ▲	7	$3.40 billion ▲
2013	4 ▲	$5.95 billion ▲	7	$4.50 billion ▲
2014	2 ▲	$7.64 billion ▲	2 ▲	$7.00 billion ▲
2015	2	$10.76 billion ▲	7 ▼	$3.50 billion ▼
2016	2	$10.35 billion ▼	5 ▲	$4.20 billion ▲
2017	1 ▲	$12.60 billion ▲	3 ▲	$5.30 billion ▲
2018	1	$12.90 billion ▲	3	
2019	1	$15.77 billion ▲	3	$6.80 billion ▲
2020	3 ▼	$19.75 billion ▲		
2021	4 ▼	$20.09 billion ▲		$9.78 billion ▼
2022	4	$24.30 billion ▲		$12.00 billion ▲
2023	3 ▲	$24.30 billion		
2024	4 ▼	$23.30 billion ▼		
2025	3 ▲	$25.84 billion ▲		

Legend
Icon	Description
Steady	Has not changed from the previous year
▲	Has increased from the previous year
▼	Has decreased from the previous year

=== Philanthropy and political funding ===
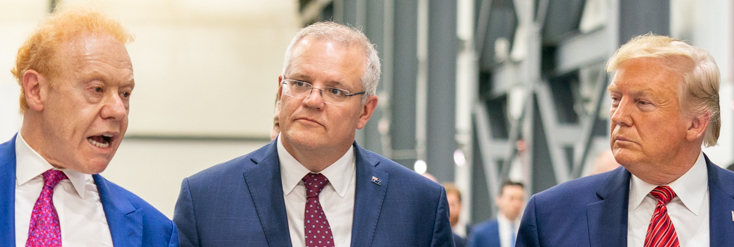
Anthony Pratt and Donald Trump with Scott Morrison on 22 September 2019, in Wapakoneta, Ohio

In 2017 Pratt, pledged to give away A$1 billion to charity before he dies.

Pratt is one of the largest political donors in Australia, donating nearly A$4 million to both major political parties in 2021–2022.

A 2023 article in Fortune described Pratt's approach to donations as "inherited wealth, used to cultivate relationships", citing nearly US$200,000 spent on a Mar-a-Lago membership and noting Pratt "once spent $1 million to attend a $50,000-a-head event where Trump was present".

Pratt is head of the Pratt Foundation, which has donated hundreds of millions of dollars since it was established and continues to give approximately US$20 million per year, including to Planned Parenthood, The Urban League, St Jude's Hospital and many others. Pratt also serves on the board of trustees of the Appeal of Conscience Foundation. Pratt is patron of the Trilateral Track II Food and Water Security Dialogue which he launched with former Israeli Prime Minister Shimon Peres between India, Israel and Australia. Pratt is a patron of the Australia India Leadership Dialogue, and founding patron of The Prince's Charities Australia.

Pratt sits on the National Board of the Muhammad Ali Center in Louisville, Kentucky, and is also active in charity organizations throughout Australia and the United States. In 1998, he arranged for Muhammad Ali to visit Australia for the Australian Football League grand final, as well as for a subsequent trip two years later. More recently, on what would have been Ali's 80th birthday, Pratt donated US$2 million to the Ali Center to further promote Ali's legacy. Pratt is a member of the Climate Group, an international environmental group founded by former British prime minister Tony Blair. He has been honoured for his efforts by Mikhail Gorbachev's Global Green USA and Ted Turner's Captain Planet Foundation.

Pratt is a member of the United States Studies Centre at the University of Sydney.

In 2007, Pratt committed to former President Clinton's Global Initiative to invest more than US$1 billion over the ensuing decade in recycling infrastructure and clean energy. He fulfilled his pledge five years early.

In 2017, Pratt hosted a food waste summit at his Melbourne home aimed at halving Australia's food waste by 2030.

In November 2021, Pratt funded the establishment of The Australia Chair at the Center for Strategic and International Studies to further promote ties between the two countries.

In December 2021, in the wake of the tornado that devastated parts of Kentucky, Pratt granted US$1 million to the state's storm relief fund and a further $1 million to the Tri-State Food Bank.

In 2022, Pratt Industries donated US$1 million to Feeding America.

=== Honours ===
In the United States

In 2009, Pratt was honored by the New York-based Foreign Policy Association with its Corporate Social Responsibility Award. New York City Mayor Michael Bloomberg presented Pratt with a proclamation declaring 17 September 2013, Pratt Industries Day. In 2016, Pratt was awarded the RISI North American Packaging CEO of the Year Award. In 2020, Pratt was named "Executive Papermaker of the Year" by leading industry publication PaperAge for his strong leadership and corporate vision. In July 2020, Pratt was named North American CEO of the Year by Fastmarkets RISI.

In Australia

In 2013, Pratt was awarded an honorary PhD by Monash University, for an "outstanding career of achievement and service to philanthropy, business and commerce". He is also a member of the Australian-American Leadership Dialogue, which seeks to strengthen and deepen the ties between Australian and American leaders.

== Personal life ==
Pratt, who is Jewish, and his family, all of whom are US citizens, used to live in both New York City and Melbourne. However, in November 2024 Pratt announced that he will move permanently to the US, having received a green card, and given that the majority of his business interested are domiciled in the US.

Pratt inherited Raheen, a heritage-listed mansion in the inner Melbourne suburb of Kew purchased by his father in the 1980s. In 2016, it was reported that he had initiated extensive renovations, with the property valued at A$100 million prior to their commencement.

In 2024 the Pratt family was embroiled in a legal stoush involving Pratt's half sister Paula who is demanding a greater share of the Pratt fortune.
