= Scott Farquhar =

Australian businessman (born 1979)

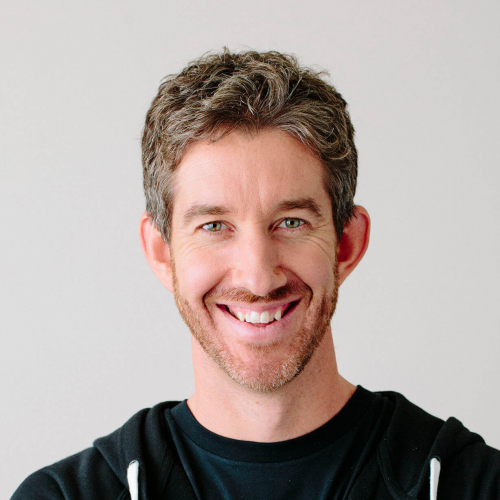
- Farquhar in 2018
- Born: December 1979 (age 46); Parramatta, New South Wales, Australia
- Education: James Ruse Agricultural High School; University of New South Wales
- Known for: Co-founding Atlassian
- Board member of: Atlassian
- Spouse: Kim Jackson (m. 2009)
- Children: 3

Scott Farquhar (born December 1979) is an Australian businessman who is the co-founder and former co-chief executive officer of software company Atlassian. Farquhar often carries the epithet of accidental billionaire after he and his business partner Mike Cannon-Brookes founded Atlassian with the aim to replicate the $48,500 graduate starting salary typical at corporations without having to work for someone else. Farquhar and Cannon-Brookes were Australia's first technology billionaires.

As of December 2024, Farquhar had an estimated net worth of US$15.5 billion, according to Forbes.

== Early life ==
Farquhar was born in December 1979 in Parramatta, Sydney. He attended Castle Hill Primary School and James Ruse Agricultural High School and graduated from the University of New South Wales, with a Bachelor of Science (BIT).

Farquhar developed an early interest in computers and his dad purchased an old computer for him to play games on, however it couldn't run Microsoft DOS, so Farquhar spent a year trying to get it to work.

== Career ==
In 2001, Mike Cannon-Brookes sent an email to his University of New South Wales classmates asking if any of them were interested in helping him launch a tech startup after graduation, and Farquhar was the only one who responded. They founded Atlassian in 2002. They bootstrapped the company for several years, financing the startup with a $10,000 credit card debt.

Their first major Atlassian product was Jira, an issue- and project-tracking software. They decided to forgo the expense of hiring sales people, and instead spent their time and money on building a good product and selling it at a more affordable price via the Atlassian website. As of 2016, the company still did not have a traditional sales force, investing instead in research and development.

In 2005, they opened an office in New York City, where most of their clients were. Later in 2005 they moved the U.S. office to San Francisco, which had a much larger pool of relevant technical talent.

Farquhar and Cannon-Brookes were recognised with the award of the 2006 Ernst & Young Entrepreneur of the Year Award.

Their first external funding for Atlassian was a $US60 million round from Accel in 2010.

In 2014, they redomiciled the company to the UK, in advance of an IPO.

On 10 December 2015, Atlassian made its initial public offering (IPO) on the Nasdaq stock exchange, putting the market capitalization of Atlassian at $4.37 billion. The IPO made Farquhar and Cannon-Brookes Australia's first tech startup billionaires and household names in Australia.

In 2022, Farquhar and Cannon-Brookes redomiciled Atlassian to the United States.

On 26 April 2024, Farquhar announced that he would resign as joint CEO of Atlassian at the end of August to focus on family time, philanthropy, and furthering the global technology industry. He remains on the board and as a special adviser. As of 2024, he owns 20 percent of Atlassian.

== Other activities ==
Farquhar is a significant investor in tech startups through a privately held investment fund, Skip Capital. The fund had a stake in several Australian tech unicorns, including Canva and Airwallex, and overseas firms, such as Figma and 1Password.

Farquhar has mentored through the Australian Businesswomen's Network and gives guest lectures on entrepreneurship to MBA students and undergraduates at the University of New South Wales, his alma mater.

Farquhar is a member of Technology Council of Australia.

In 2014 Farquhar co-founded Pledge 1%, a movement that encourages companies to dedicate 1% of equity, 1% of employee time, 1% of product and 1% of profit to charity.

Farquhar is part-owner of Factor Bikes, a high-end British bicycle manufacturer.

== Personal life ==
Farquhar married investment banker Kim Jackson in 2009, and they have three sons. In 2017 Farquhar purchased from the Fairfax family its former ancestral Sydney harbourside home, Elaine, for $75 million. This was subsequently sold on 4 October 2024 for A$130 million

The Point Piper home set on 6,986 square metres (75,200 sq ft) had been in the ownership of the Fairfax family since 1891 and was vacant for nearly twenty years prior to its purchase by Farquhar. In 2020 it was reported that Farquhar plans a partial knock-down of unsympathetic renovations to Elaine, and rebuild a A$30 million contemporary home. In 2018 Cannon-Brookes bought the house next door, Fairwater, Australia's most expensive house at approximately A$100 million. In April 2022 Farquhar saved a man's life in Las Vegas.

In 2018, Farquhar spoke out against the Government of Australia's renaming of the 457 visas, saying the move damages Australia's reputation as a place that people want to come to work.

=== Net worth ===
Alongside his business partner, Cannon-Brookes, Farquhar debuted on the 2007 BRW Young Rich list of the richest Australians aged 40 and under, and on the BRW Rich 200 in 2013 with an estimated net worth of A$250 million. In 2016, his net worth was estimated by Forbes on the list of Australia's 50 Richest people as US$1.75 billion; by BRW Rich 200 as A$2.00 billion; and by the Sunday Times Rich List as £906 million. As of 2021, Farquhar's net worth was assessed as US$13.70 billion according to the Forbes list of Australia's 50 Richest people. He was ranked fourth on the Financial Review Rich List 2025 with a net worth of A$21.42 billion.

| Year | Financial Review Rich List | | Forbes Australia's 50 Richest | | Sunday Times Rich List | |
| Year | Rank | Net worth (A$) | Rank | Net worth (US$) | Rank | Net worth (£) |
|---|---|---|---|---|---|---|
| 2013 | 190 ▲ | $0.25 billion ▲ | n/a | not listed | | |
| 2014 | 35 ▲ | $1.07 billion ▲ | n/a | not listed | | |
| 2015 | 42 ▲ | $1.14 billion ▲ | 25 ▲ | $1.10 billion ▲ | | |
| 2016 | 18 ▲ | $2.00 billion ▲ | 15 ▲ | $1.75 billion ▲ | | £906 million ▲ |
| 2017 | 18 | $2.51 billion ▲ | 10 ▲ | $3.40 billion ▲ | | |
| 2018 | 11 ▲ | $5.16 billion ▲ | 5 ▲ | | | |
| 2019 | 5 ▲ | $9.75 billion ▲ | 5 | $6.40 billion ▲ | | |
| 2020 | 6 ▼ | $16.69 billion ▲ | | | | |
| 2021 | 5 ▲ | $20.00 billion ▲ | | $13.70 billion ▲ | | |
| 2022 | 4 ▲ | $26.40 billion ▲ | | | | |
| 2023 | 7 ▼ | $18.16 billion ▼ | | | | |
| 2024 | 5 ▲ | $22.88 billion ▲ | | $15.50 billion ▲ | | |
| 2025 | 4 ▲ | $21.42 billion ▼ | | | | |

Legend
| Icon | Description |
|---|---|
| Steady | Has not changed from the previous year |
| ▲ | Has increased from the previous year |
| ▼ | Has decreased from the previous year |
