= Visy =

Australian paper and packaging company

Visy Industries
- Type: Private
- Industry: Packaging
- Founder: Richard Pratt
- Headquarters: Melbourne, Australia
- Revenue: ▲$3 billion (2020)
- Number of employees: 11,000

Visy Industries (known as Pratt Industries USA in the US) is a privately owned Australian-American paper, packaging and recycling company established in Melbourne in 1948. Visy was founded by a number of people. Richard Pratt acted as the head of the company after 1969 until his death in April 2009, when his son Anthony Pratt assumed the role of executive chairman. Since his assumption of the role, Anthony Pratt has presided over a major expansion into the Asian packaging market and moved Visy to a position as a key player in food security for the region.

Visy operates more than 180 facilities worldwide, and employs more than 9,500 people in Australia and the United States, with total sales exceeding $5 billion.

== History ==
Visy Industries originated in 1948 with a 1000-pound loan from Richard Pratt's aunt, Ida Visbord. Initially, the company had three partners—Visbord's husband Max Plotka, Richard Pratt's father Leon, and engineer Les Feldman—focusing on corrugated cardboard.

After Leon Pratt's death in 1969, Richard Pratt assumed control, leading to company expansion with new plants in New South Wales and Queensland during the 1970s. By the end of the decade, Visy was producing over 100,000 tons of boxes annually.

In the late 1970s and early 80s, the company further expanded, establishing 100% recycled paper mills, such as the one in Warwick Farm, Sydney. By 1990, Visy held a national market share exceeding 40% with over 2000 employees.

Richard and Anthony Pratt then expanded to North America, overseeing the start-up and development of Pratt Industries USA.

In July 2020, Visy Industries purchased the Australian and New Zealand glass manufacturing operations of O-I Glass.

=== 2001–2003 ===
In September 2001, Visy undertook the-then largest development in its history, the construction of a $450 million Kraft paper mill in Tumut, New South Wales. This was the first Kraft mill built in the world in 20 years. It was the biggest investment in regional Australia since the Snowy Mountains Scheme (RP Speech), and was hailed by Australia's leading environmentalists for its commitment to sustainability. It also has an advanced water usage system, with near-zero levels of effluent leaving the site. The Tumut mill is the most water efficient in the world – requiring just five tons of water to produce every ton of product, compared to the global average of 25 tons. It uses only forest thinnings and off-cuts for fiber.

Ten years later, Visy built a second Kraft paper mill, bringing the total investment to Tumut to almost $1 billion. The mill was opened by NSW Premier Barry O’Farrell, and was also hailed by environmentalists. It was a winner of the Australian Business Awards for "Environmental Sustainability."

Visy continued to grow by acquisition as well as green-fielding. In 2001, the company effectively doubled in size when it acquired Southcorp Packaging. At this stage Visy was operating on more than 100 packaging and recycling sites in Australia, New Zealand and the U.S. Visy also expanded its product mix to include steel and aluminum cans, PET bottles, beverage cartons and plastic packaging. It also continued to be a world leader in recycling — during this period Visy opened Australia's largest materials recovery facility in Smithfield, New South Wales.

=== Post-2009 leadership under Anthony Pratt ===
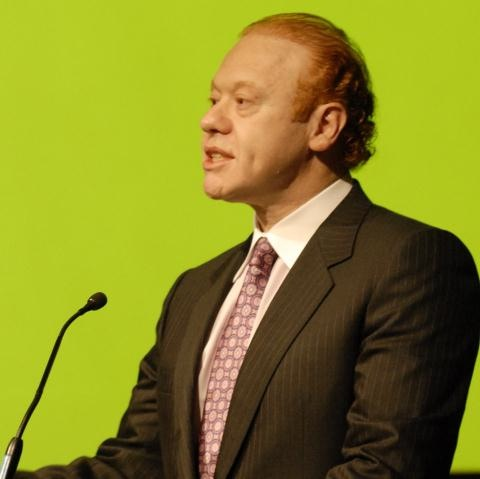
Anthony Pratt

In 2009, upon Anthony Pratt's ascendency to Executive Chairman, Visy appointed former ACCC chairman Professor Allan Fels to chair its Governance Committee. Anthony Pratt also announced that Jeff Bleich would join Visy's advisory board; other advisory board members, including Dryden Spring and Allan Moss, were also appointed.

Following Richard Pratt's death in April 2009, Anthony Pratt returned to Australia to become Global Executive Chairman of Visy Industries, in addition to him continuing his long-time position as Chairman of Pratt Industries USA. Just two years after he assumed the company's leadership, Visy jumped from 43rd to 3rd fin the AMR Corporate Citizenship Index, part of an annual survey of more than 60,000 Australians.

Under Anthony Pratt's leadership, the company expanded its Asian presence and participation. Earnings from its Asian operations had increased by $100 million a year by 2013. Visy has also set up warehouse distribution centers outside Shanghai and Beijing, as well as a trading office in Shenzhen, which is selling Visy paper into the Chinese market. Visy's growing focus on Asian markets received a major boost in 2013 when Anthony Pratt announced plans to double the company's earnings in the region by building new packaging plants in at least four South-East Asian countries. They will be modelled on the group's existing plastics plants in Thailand, Vietnam and Malaysia. In September 2013, Pratt was elected an executive member of the Australia-Japan Business Cooperation Committee, a group dedicated for more than 50 years to strengthening ties between the two countries. In October, Pratt's growing business interests in Asia prompted Australia's Prime Minister Tony Abbott to invite him on an official visit to Indonesia — the first overseas’ trip by the incoming leader.

Pratt Industries runs the only paper mill in New York city, which was founded in 1997. New York Mayor Michael Bloomberg designated 17 September 2013 as "Pratt Industries Day" in New York, in tribute to the company's commitment to recycling and the environment after its mill had reached the milestone of recycling five million tons of paper.

As of 2012, Visy was the largest exporter of shipping containers from Australian ports, moving approximately 60,000 per year.

== Controversy ==
In December 2005 the Australian Competition and Consumer Commission (ACCC) commenced prosecution against Visy for alleged involvement in a cartel in the packaging industry. In 2007, Richard Pratt and the Visy group received a A$36 million fine for price fixing, representing the largest fine in Australian history at the time. Richard Pratt and several of his senior executives admitted to wrong-doing in the case. The Justice presiding, Peter Heeley, described them as "the worst cartel to come before the courts in 30-plus years".

In 2016 the Australian Taxation Office revealed that in 2013–14, despite earning more than $2.5 billion in revenue, the holding company Pratt Consolidated Holdings had paid no tax. Further, that Thorney Investments, operated by Richard Pratt's son-in-law Alex Waislitz, which earned $430 million in revenue, had also paid no tax.

=== Hells Angels links ===
Visy Industries has been linked to outlaw motorcycle group, the Hells Angels. Visy Industries employs a trucking company run by Stephen James Rogers, a convicted drug trafficker and founding chapter boss of the Hells Angels. Rogers was sentenced in 2007 to three years' prison for drug trafficking, and a senior Visy Industries manager gave character evidence for Rogers at his trial and stated the company would stand by him despite his conviction for trafficking amphetamines. In 2012, Visy Industries was accused of using the Hells Angels to collect their debts. Police and industry sources state Visy founder Richard Pratt, who died in 2009, personally approved the deal with the Hells Angels after the state government removed the need for debt collectors to be licensed. Visy Industries have denied the accusations calling it "nonsense".

=== Odour Pollution in Reservoir ===
The paper mill recycling plant situated in Reservoir in the north of Melbourne, is one of the eight paper mills across Australia ran by Visy. From 2020, EPA Victoria received multiple complaints from local communities about the smell coming from the plant.

Odorous pollution was released from chimneys due to the treatment process happening in the mill, the smell was described as varying from vinegar to grease trap.

EPA submitted four remedial notices and fined the company $9,000 for failing to stop the smell a year later. Mid 2023, odour emissions were still monitored by EPA around the site.

== Sustainability ==
Pratt has organised the build of a $50 million, 100% recycled plastics plant in Sydney. This plant will enable Visy to make its PET and HDPE bottles out of 100% recycled plastic resin.

Visy-Pratt Industries USA have continued to build clean energy plants which now include facilities in New South Wales (Tumut), Victoria (Melbourne), Queensland and Atlanta. These waste-to-energy plants generate coal-free electricity. They also allow Visy to expand its recycling capabilities beyond converting paper and plastics into recycled goods, residual waste is burnt to extract 'reusable' energy from those streams. It will also enable the company to convert almost all remaining garbage into clean energy, thus helping close down landfills.

== Philanthropy ==
The Pratt Foundation was established by Richard and Jeanne Pratt in 1978 to support various charitable causes and initiatives throughout Australia. Since then, it has donated more than $250 million. In addition, Jeanne and Richard Pratt helped raise a further $250 million by opening their home, Raheen, to other charitable fundraisers. The foundation is chaired by Anthony Pratt's sister, Heloise Waislitz. Its chief executive is Sam Lipski, a Melbourne-based journalist, and it supports areas including medical research, education, the arts, and relief of poverty.

The Pratt family is also behind VisyCares, a non-profit begun in 1995 that promotes social responsibility at Visy through donations to support community-based projects such as youth, immigrant and learning centres.

== Awards ==
Visy won the 2004 Banksia Environmental Gold Award, and was named Overall Show Winner the 2011 Australian Packaging Design Awards.

In 2013, Visy and the Banksia Foundation – an Australian non-profit which promotes environmental excellence – teamed up to inaugurate the Richard Pratt-Banksia CEO Award. The award recognises an individual executive's contributions towards the economic, social and environmental sustainability achievements of the organization or company he/she leads. The award was named in honor of Pratt. The 2013 winner was Ravi Naidu, CEO of the Cooperative Research Centre for Contamination Assessment and Remediation of the Environment.

== See also ==
- List of paper mills
