= Smorgon =

Smorgon may refer to the following:

== People ==
- David Smorgon (born 1947), Australian businessman, President of the Western Bulldogs football club
- Graham Smorgon, Australian businessman, former President of the Carlton Football Club
- Loti Smorgon (1919–2013), Australian philanthropist
- Victor Smorgon (1913–2009), Australian industrialist

== Places ==
- Smarhon' (Smorgon), a city in Belarus
- Smarhon Air Base, a Soviet Air Force base in Belarus

== Organisations ==
- FC Smorgon, a Belarusian football club
- Smorgon Steel, a former Australian steel manufacturing business
