= Modular Mining Systems =

American mining equipment company

Modular Mining
- Company type: Subsidiary
- Industry: Mining, Computer software, Computer hardware
- Founded: 1979
- Founder: Dr. James Wm. White
- Headquarters: Tucson, Arizona, U.S.A.
- Number of locations: Australia, Brazil, Canada, Chile, India, Indonesia, Mexico, Peru, Russia, South Africa, United States
- Area served: Worldwide
- Key people: Jorge Mascena (President and CEO)
- Products: Fleet management system (FMS) software; Maintenance management software; High-precision Machine guidance system; Interface and module; GPS tracking device; Mobile computing platform; Wireless networking device; Railway centralized traffic control; Proximity detection
- Number of employees: 800+ worldwide
- Parent: Komatsu
- Website: www.modularmining.com

Modular Mining is a privately held company that develops, manufactures, markets, and services mining equipment management systems, headquartered in Tucson, Arizona, U.S.A. Modular's DISPATCH Fleet Management System is available in eight languages, and has been deployed at more than 250 active mine sites; among these are nine of the ten highest-producing surface mines in the world.

Modular Mining was founded in Tucson, Arizona, in 1979. Over the next two years, Modular Mining developed and successfully implemented the DISPATCH system, a computerized fleet management system designed to optimize haul truck assignments to loading and dumping points in an open-pit mine and to produce operating reports during the shift. Following the DISPATCH system's development, Modular Mining has gone on to create a number of other software and hardware products that seek to improve different areas of mine operations.

In 1996, Komatsu America Corporation (KAC) of Rolling Meadows, Illinois, in concert with their parent company, heavy equipment manufacturer Komatsu, Limited, of Tokyo, Japan (Komatsu), acquired a controlling interest in Modular Mining. In 2003, KAC acquired the remaining shares of the company, and today Modular Mining remains a wholly owned Komatsu subsidiary.

== History ==
=== First Installations ===
From 1980 to 1981, Modular worked with Phelps Dodge Corporation (a wholly owned subsidiary of Freeport-McMoRan Copper & Gold since 2007) to develop and install the first version of the DISPATCH system at the company's open–pit copper mine in Tyrone, New Mexico. Following this implementation, Phelps Dodge conducted a productivity study on the system, showing a 10% production increase.

In 1985, Phelps Dodge contracted Modular Mining to develop and install a DISPATCH system tailored to the rail operation at its mine in Morenci, Arizona, and the company also had the system installed at El Chino Mine in Santa Rita, New Mexico.

=== Global Growth ===
Following initial installations in the Southwestern U.S., Modular Mining went on to install the DISPATCH System at various mines around the world. International customers included Iron Ore Co. of Canada (IOC) at Labrador in 1985; Palabora Mining Co. Ltd. in South Africa in 1985, and the Cerrejón mine in Colombia in 1988. After a decade of rising industry demand for the DISPATCH system, Modular established its first subsidiary, Modular Mining Systems, Pty. Ltd., in Caboolture, Australia in 1989 to support its expanding Australasian customer base. The Australia office was relocated to Tuggerah, Australia in 1993.

Modular has established the following global subsidiaries:

- 1989 – Modular Mining Systems, Pty. Ltd., New South Wales, Australia
- 1993 – Modular Mining Systems, Inc. y Cia Ltda., Santiago, Chile
- 1996 – P.T. Modular Mining Systems, Balikpapan, Indonesia
- 1998 – Modular Mining Systems China, Beijing, China
- 2000 – Modular Mining System Africa, Pty. Ltd., Johannesburg, South Africa
- 2000 – Modular Mining Systems do Brasil Ltda., Recife, Brazil
- 2000 – Modular Mining Systems Canada Ltd., Port Coquitlam, Canada
- 2002 – Modular Mining Systems SCRL, Lima, Peru
- 2004 – Modular Mining Systems India Pvt. Ltd., Pune, India
- 2006 – Modular Mining Systems Eurasia, Moscow, Russia
- 2009 – Modular Mining Systems do Brasil Ltda., Belo Horizonte, Brazil

=== Modular Today ===
Modular Mining has established itself in mine management technology, with systems currently running in eight languages at sites around the world. In October 2010, Modular announced its two–hundredth customer: Vale S.A.’s Moatize mine, an open–pit coalmine in Tete Province, Mozambique, which marked the third greenfield mine that year to implement Modular technology. Recent innovations from Modular have come in the areas of machine guidance, remote vital signs monitoring, and mine safety.

== Products ==
=== The IntelliMine Suite ===
Modular provides software applications and hardware products designed to enhance mining operations’ productivity, safety, and equipment availability/utilization. The core Modular product line, the Intelli–Mine integrated asset management suite, includes the following products:

- Modular Mining's flagship product, the DISPATCH Fleet Management system (FMS) for open–pit mines, has become established as a standard for fleet management software in the mining industry. At its core, the system optimizes haul truck assignments, reducing truck queuing at loading and dumping locations, through the use of multiple optimization algorithms, including linear programming, best path, and dynamic programming. A mine's dispatcher uses the system to centrally manage mine operations, including equipment allocation, shift change, refueling, and equipment downtime events. Other features of the system include GPS-based equipment positioning, equipment health monitoring, maintenance tracking, blending, and production reporting. The DISPATCH system enables real-time, computerized, central management of mine operations to maximize production and efficiency, while increasing safety and control.
- The DISPATCH Underground system, first deployed in 1991, is the only fully integrated mine management technology for underground operations. The system uses rugged field computer components designed for underground mining environments. DISPATCH Underground supports all major underground mining methods and processes, providing tools for inventory and material movement, crew management, and fleet monitoring, and location management.
- The MineCare maintenance management system is a software application designed to minimize maintenance response time, perform predictive and reliability-centered maintenance (RCM), provide critical failure analysis information, and report key performance indicators (KPIs) to mine maintenance personnel in real time. Modular offers over 175 interfaces to original equipment manufacturer (OEM) systems, giving operators access to equipment data, and allowing maintenance personnel to monitor the health of components such as engines, hydraulics, electrical systems, and tires. The MineCare system has helped save considerable maintenance costs and equipment downtime at mining operations around the world.
- The ProVision machine guidance system utilizes high–precision Global Navigation Satellite Systems or GNSS (including GPS and GLONASS) to enhance safety, provide reporting and immediate operator feedback, highlight opportunities for improvement initiatives, and reduce operating costs. ProVision technology is available for excavators, loaders, backhoes, drills, and dozers. To improve safety, the ProVision system offers features such as the Proximity Detection module, which is designed to alert equipment operators of encroaching equipment, hazards, and keep–out zones by use of GNSS and on–board camera.
- The RoadMap position and safety tracking system enhances safety for light vehicles at mine sites. It monitors light vehicle positions and provides real–time awareness of changing conditions to visitors and mine personnel. Any equipment with a RoadMap system installed continuously tracks its own position using GPS, comparing it in real time to a preconfigured road network. The basic configuration uses a PDA with internal GPS receiver.

=== Autonomous Haulage Systems ===
From early on, the development of autonomous (driverless) haulage systems (AHS), i.e. vehicle automation has played a significant role in Modular Mining's affiliation with Komatsu. In November 2011, multinational mining and resources company Rio Tinto signed an agreement with Komatsu Limited for the purchase of 150 autonomous haul trucks, to be implemented into the company's Western Australian Pilbara operations by the end of 2015. The deal marked the first large–scale commercial deployment of autonomous haulage in mining, and came as a major milestone for Modular as a company. Modular's contribution to the Komatsu AHS includes: the supervisory system, operational intelligence, communications infrastructure, operation reporting, and vehicle–interaction safety technologies. This implementation of autonomous haulage has been credited with the ability to create high–tech jobs and help improve mine productivity, safety, and environmental performance.

=== Presence in Underground Mining ===
In 1991, Modular Mining Systems developed and installed the world's first underground fleet management system at a diamond mine in South Africa. The DISPATCH Underground system increased productivity by detecting equipment positions in real time using infrared beacons, as well as by operator interaction with a field computer on board the Load–Haul–Dump (LHD) machines used to extract ore-bearing rock. Field information from the on –board computers was delivered to the central server. Today, some of the world's largest underground mining operations use DISPATCH Underground to proactively manage underground mining equipment. Solution was updated in 2016 according to the recent market requirements.

=== ModularReady OEM Interfaces ===
Modular has relationships with all major Original Equipment Manufacturers (OEMs) of heavy equipment in mining to provide asset health monitoring. ModularReady interfaces allow 3rd–party systems to interface with Intelli–Mine products. In total, Modular has over 175 interfaces that provide thousands of parameters to issue payload readings, automate haul cycle events, issue OEM and user–defined alarms, and analyze trends that indicate impending equipment failure. ModularReady interfaces provide the ability to aggregate min, max, and average parameter readings, streaming them to central applications such as MineCare for use in RCM analysis.

== Services ==
=== Value Added Services ===
Modular provides value-added services, to help mines discover and address areas for improvement in various parts of mine operations and maintenance. The Modular Value Add Services (VAS) division specializes in design, implementation, and optimization of mine management systems, for both surface and underground mines. Services include product user training, consulting, business process mapping (BPM), performance benchmarking, change management, and lean services, among others. In April 2011, Modular expanded its offer of change management and lean to all customers worldwide.

== See also ==
- Mining
- Komatsu Limited
