= Maree Clarke =

Australian artist and curator (born 1961)

Maree Clarke (born 1961) is an Australian multidisciplinary artist and curator from Victoria, renowned for her work in reviving south-eastern Aboriginal Australian art practices.

== Early life and education ==
Maree Clarke was born in 1961 at Swan Hill, Victoria, of Mutti Mutti, Yorta Yorta, BoonWurrung, and Wemba Wemba descent. She grew up in and around Mildura in North Western Victoria.

== Career ==
Clarke began working as an educator in her home town in 1978, which provided her with a solid base from which to develop her career in promoting and supporting South-East Aboriginal histories, culture and knowledge. Along with her brother and sister, Clarke established Kiah Krafts, an Aboriginal arts enterprise, in Mildura.

The City of Port Phillip became the first Victorian local government to establish a centre dedicated to actively promoting Aboriginal arts and culture, creating the first Koori Arts Unit in St Kilda. Clarke was the first Koori Arts Officer from 1994 to 1998, and instrumental in its success. In 1996, Clarke curated, with Kimba Thompson and Len Tregonning, the We Iri We Homeborn Aboriginal and Torres Strait Islander Arts Festival. Her collaborations with these two artists as well as Sonja Hodge can be seen in public artworks around the city of Melbourne.

== Art practice ==
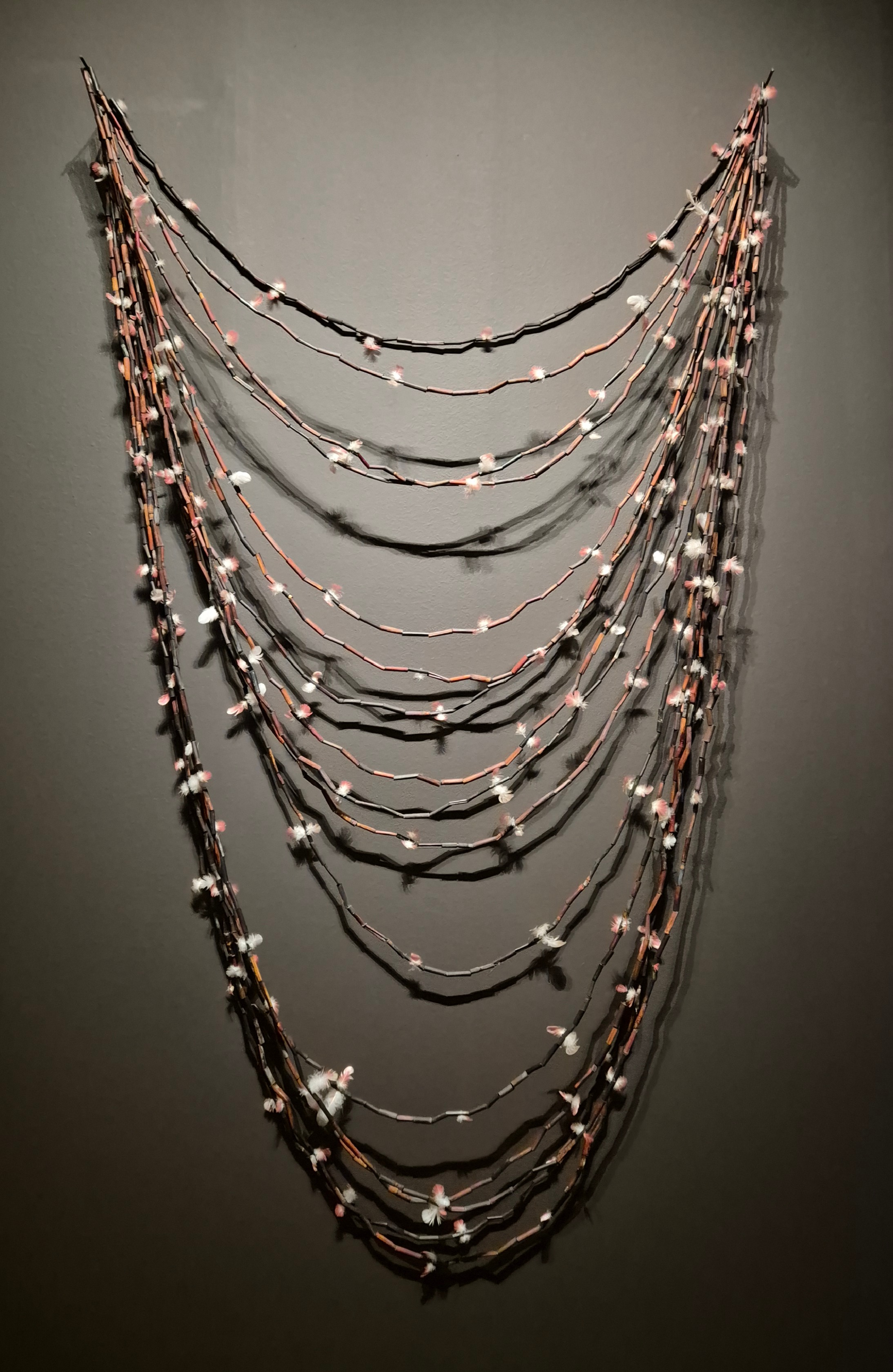
Black river reeds necklace with galah feathers, waxed thread (2019), Tarnanthi 2025, AGSA

Clarke works across a range of mediums, including photography, sculpture, painting, and jewellery.

Research and revival of cultural practices which have been lost as a result of colonisation form an important part of Clarke's art practice. Clarke goes to museums to research and work with objects in their collections. Her work has seen her become a pivotal figure in the reclamation of cultural and artistic practices of South Eastern Australian Aboriginal peoples. Her work has included eel traps, kopis, possum skin cloak-making, and kangaroo tooth necklaces (Thung-ung Coorang). She is committed to preserving intergenerational memories of cultural practices.

== Recognition and awards ==
Made from Memory (Nan's house) (2017) was purchased by the National Gallery of Australia in 2017 in recognition of the 50th Anniversary of the 1967 Referendum.

In 2021, Clarke was the first living Aboriginal artist to be featured in a solo exhibition in the National Gallery of Victoria (NGV) in Melbourne.

In 2022, a major retrospective of Clarke's works titled Ancestral Memories was shown at the NGV.

In 2023, Clarke won the Melbourne Prize for Urban Sculpture, "for her recent experimental work in glass as well as the pivotal role she has played in the Victorian Indigenous art scene over the past three decades".

== Personal life ==
Clarke has lived in Melbourne since 1988 and as of 2021.

== Collections ==
Clarke's work is included in the following galleries and collections:

- Art Gallery of South Australia, Adelaide
- City of Port Phillip Art Collection, Melbourne, Victoria
- City of Stonnington, Melbourne, Victoria
- Koorie Heritage Trust
- Mildura Art Centre Collection, Mildura
- Monash University Museum of Art
- Monash University Art Collection, Prato Campus, Tuscany, Italy
- Museum Victoria
- National Gallery of Australia, Canberra
- National Gallery of Victoria
- National Museum of Australia

== Exhibitions ==
=== Solo exhibitions ===
- 2021 Ancestral Memories, National Gallery of Victoria, Melbourne
- 2019 Eel Trap with Mitch Mahoney, Footscray Community Arts Centre, Footscray, Victoria
- 2019 Translating Culture with Mitch Mahoney, Canberra Glassworks, Kingston, ACT
- 2019 Ancestral Memory, Treasury Gallery Old Quad, University of Melbourne, Melbourne
- 2019 Reimagining Culture – Contemporary Connections to Culture, Mildura Arts Centre, Mildura
- 2018 Reimagining Culture, Arts Space Wodonga, Wodonga
- 2015 Ritual: Connection to Country, Koorie Heritage Trust, Melbourne
- 2011 Ritual & Ceremony, Bunjilaka Gallery, Melbourne Museum, Melbourne

=== Group exhibitions ===
- 2019 Linear, Powerhouse Museum, Sydney, New South Wales
- 2019 Indigenous Design, Parliament House, Canberra, ACT
- 2019 The Women’s Show, Vivien Anderson Gallery, Melbourne, Victoria
- 2018 Colony: Frontier Wars, National Gallery of Victoria, Melbourne
- 2018 Island Welcome, Craft Victoria, Melbourne
- 2018 The Women’s Show, Vivien Anderson Gallery, Melbourne, Victoria
- 2017 Defying Empire: 3rd National Indigenous Art Triennial, National Gallery of Australia, Canberra, ACT
- 2017 An Unorthodox flow of images, Centre for Contemporary Photography, Melbourne, Victoria(as part of The Melbourne Festival)
- 2017 Get the picture (Melbourne 2017 Fringe Festival) Blak Dot Gallery, Brunswick, Victoria
- 2017 The Women’s Show, Vivien Anderson Gallery, Melbourne, Victoria
- 2016 Sovereignty, Australian Centre for Contemporary Art (ACCA), Melbourne, Victoria
- 2016 Who’s Afraid of Colour? National Gallery of Victoria, Melbourne
