= Wenco International Mining Systems =

Canadian technology company

Wenco International Mining Systems, Ltd.
- Type: Subsidiary
- Industry: Mining, Computer software, Computer hardware
- Founded: 1983
- Headquarters: Richmond, British Columbia, Canada,
- Area served: Worldwide
- Key people: Andrew Pyne (President and CEO)
- Products: Fleet management software; Maintenance management software; Machine guidance system; Interface; GPS tracking device; Mobile computing platform; Wireless networking device; Proximity detection; Business intelligence; Fatigue management
- Number of employees: 200+ worldwide
- Parent: Hitachi Construction Machinery
- Website: www.wencomine.com

Wenco International Mining Systems, Ltd. (Wenco) is a Canadian technology company that develops, manufactures, and distributes computer systems to manage and control surface mining equipment. It is a provider of fleet management, machine guidance, asset health, and industrial safety technology to the mining sector. The company's computer systems include software and hardware that record data related to mining equipment activity, location, time, production, and maintenance. This information also displays to machine operators and other mining personnel. Its systems run at open-pit sites operated by large mining conglomerates De Beers Group of Companies, Syncrude, KCGM, the United States Steel Corporation, Canadian Natural Resources Limited, and others.

Founded in 1983, Wenco maintains its head office in the Metro Vancouver city of Richmond, British Columbia. It also operates satellite sales and support offices in the United States, Australia, Chile, South Africa, Russia, India, UAE, and Indonesia. Since 2009, the company has operated as a subsidiary of Hitachi Construction Machinery Co., Ltd., a division of Hitachi Group of Companies.

== Products ==
Wenco's systems rely on a combination of GNSS technology, wireless infrastructure, and computer hardware and software to track mining equipment activity, location, time, and production information. These systems connect mobile computers on field equipment such as excavators, bulldozers, and haul trucks with office computers and an SQL-compliant database. Mines use these systems for a range of purposes, including pit reporting, ore blend control, material tracking, production efficiency, and overall pit management. Wenco also shares its system data with common third-party mining technology systems through its public API.

In May 2021, Wenco acquired Australian company SmartCap Technologies, developers of an EEG-based wearable fatigue management system.

== Ongoing development ==
Since 2013, Wenco has pursued development and testing of an autonomous haulage system in conjunction with Hitachi Construction Machinery. Wenco is also working with Hitachi Construction Machinery and third-party organizations to establish open standards for autonomous fleet control technologies.
