= Carlton Football Club salary cap breach =

Australian rules football scandal

The Carlton Football Club salary cap breach was the breach of the Australian Football League's salary cap by the Carlton Football Club, primarily in the late 1990s and early 2000s. The breaches were a major scandal for the club, and resulted in the club being fined almost one million dollars (which was a record fine for an AFL team until Essendon in 2013), and restricted from recruiting players via the AFL draft, both of which had lasting implications on the club's position.

== Investigation ==
At the end of the 2002 AFL season, shortly before the 2002 AFL draft was to take place, the Australian Football League announced that it had found the Carlton Football Club guilty of "deliberate, elaborate and sophisticated" breaches of the salary cap during 2000 and 2001. The breaches were related to "under the table" payments made outside the salary cap to four players: Craig Bradley, Stephen Silvagni, Stephen O'Reilly and Fraser Brown.

The club had previously been found guilty of minor breaches of the salary cap, as had many other clubs in the league, but this was the largest and most systematic case of salary cap cheating that had been proven in the league's history. The AFL accordingly reacted with strong penalties. The club was fined a total of $930,000 (including $57,576 which had been suspended from previous breaches). The club was also stripped of several early draft picks in the 2002 and 2003 AFL drafts, specifically:

- Draft picks No. 1, 2, 31 and 34 from the 2002 National Draft
- All draft picks in the 2003 Preseason Draft
- Its first and second round draft picks in the 2003 National Draft

Carlton later earned a priority draft pick for the 2003 Draft, which it was permitted to keep, even though that selection took place prior to the first round of the draft. This was used to recruit Andrew Walker.

Although the club was penalised, no individuals within the club were ever formally identified or penalised by the AFL's investigation. The Carlton Football Club stated at the time that the only people at the club who had knowledge of the breaches were president John Elliott, and directors Wes Lofts, Kevin Hall and Barry Stone. The players were never found guilty of any wrongdoing.

== Aftermath ==
The penalties struck Carlton at a very inopportune time. Historically one of the most successful clubs both on and off the field, decisions made in the late 1990s meant the club was already struggling in both areas in 2002, and the impact of the penalties severely weakened the club's position for the next five or six years.

On-field, the club had fallen from playing finals in 2001 to winning its first ever wooden spoon in 2002, after the retirements of many champion players from the 1990s. Despite the loss of the draft picks, which came at the time when the club needed them the most to rebuild its playing list, the club was mostly uncompetitive on the field in the six seasons between 2002 and 2007, during which Carlton finished last three times, and two other times in the bottom two. During this period, it suffered seven defeats by more than 100 points, which included a then-record 124-point loss to North Melbourne in the final round of the 2003 season, and a 117-point defeat to the Brisbane Lions at the Gabba in round 16, 2007, after which Denis Pagan was sacked as the club's coach. Towards the end of the 2007 season, it was alleged that Carlton deliberately lost matches (i.e. tanking) in order to gain the number one draft pick for a third consecutive season. It was not until 2009 that the club had rebuilt its list sufficiently to return to the finals.

Off the field, the club had already posted an operating loss of $500,000 in 2002, and its decision to invest in the upgrade of Princes Park was inopportune and ultimately extremely unprofitable, as the AFL increasingly moved games away from the stadium. After the penalties, the club was not only forced to pay the $930,000 fine, but also (and, ironically) settle the under-the-table contracts it still had with Silvagni and Bradley. By 2005, the club was close to requiring assistance from the AFL's Competitive Balance Fund. To stay afloat, the club took a loan of $1,500,000 from the AFL in 2003 – a loan which it was still yet to repay as late as 2009.

The four directors implicated in the illegal payments were all removed from the club in the board election at the end of 2002. John Elliott was voted out as president, and the club sought to distance itself from him; the Elliott Stand at Princes Park was renamed the Carlton Heroes Stand. Carlton struggled to maintain off-field stability, with Ian Collins and Graham Smorgon both serving unstable tenures as president over the next few years, before Richard Pratt took over in 2007. It was not until Pratt's presidency that the club returned to a stable off-field position.

== See also ==
- Canterbury-Bankstown Bulldogs salary cap breach
- Melbourne Storm salary cap breach
- Essendon Football Club supplements saga
