= Smorgon family =

Jewish-Australian business family

Smorgon
- Current region: Melbourne, Australia
- Origin: Heidelberg, Taurida Governorate, Ukraine (now Novohorivka, Tokmak)
- Members: Norman Smorgon; Victor Smorgon; Loti Smorgon; Graham Smorgon; David Smorgon; Ron Castan; Stephen Smorgon

The Smorgon family is a Jewish-Australian business family known for their establishment of Smorgon Steel.

== Family tree ==
- Norman (Naum) Smorgon (17 December 1884 – 1956) m. (1) Tzippa Smorgon nee Mejov (1887 - ??) (div. 1925); (2) m. Vera Naumovna Smorgon nee Feldman (1885 - ??) (div. 1954);
  - Eric (Isiat) Smorgon (1911 – 1999) m. Anne Smorgon nee Bernstein (1910 – 1996)
    - Jack Smorgon m. Val Sheezel
    - Gary Smorgon
    - Robert Smorgon m. Vicki Thurin
      - Stephen Smorgon m. Kelly Hudson
  - Victor (Abrasha) Smorgon AC (1913 – 2009) m. Loti Smorgon AO nee Kiffer (1919 – 2013)
    - Ginny Green nee Smorgon m. Leslie Green
    - Vicki Vidor nee Smorgon m. (1) Raymond Vidor; (2) Peter Avery
    - Bindy Koadlow nee Smorgon m. (1) Colin Edwards; (2) David Koadlow
    - Sandra Bardas nee Smorgon OAM (1941 – 2007) m. David Bardas
      - Belinda, Robyn, Anna, Elli, Morris and Ben
  - Anna / Annia / Anne Castan nee Smorgon (1909 – 2000) m. Morris / Mossy Castan nee Lubenfeld (1906 – 1971)
    - Aaron Ronald (Ron) Castan AM QC (1939 – 1999) m. Nellie Castan
      - Melissa, Lindy and Stephen
    - Noel Isiah Castan (1942 – 1998) m. Anita Castan nee Dundas
      - Karina, Rowan, Jason and Kylie
    - George Castan m. Freda Glover
      - Richard, Andrew and Suzie
  - Clara Orloff nee Smorgon (1916 – 1946) and Joseph (Joe) Orloff (1912 – 1977)
    - Raymond Orloff m. Mary-Lou Phillips
    - Paulette Orloff m. (1) Peter Terracall; (2) Alex Steinlouf
- Moses Smorgon (1892 – 1954) m. Luba Smorgon nee. Novic (1887 – 1988)
  - George Smorgon (1921 – 2004) m. Gita Smorgon nee Fetter
    - David Smorgon (1947 - ) m. (1) Rosynly Smorgon nee Hirsch (?? – 2008) m. (2) Kathie Smorgon nee Rozner
      - Dean (1969–70), Ricky (1971–72), and Dale (1974–75)
    - Barry Smorgon m. Sandra Smorgon nee Horin
    - Rodney Smorgon m. Ann Smorgon nee Jackman
- Sam Smorgon AO (1924 – 2019) m. Minnie Smorgon (1927 - )
  - Graham Smorgon AM m. Annette Finkel
  - Barbara Smorgon m. (1) Phil Krasonstein; (2) Barry Landau
  - Marilyn Smorgin m. Noah Mazor

== Family origins ==
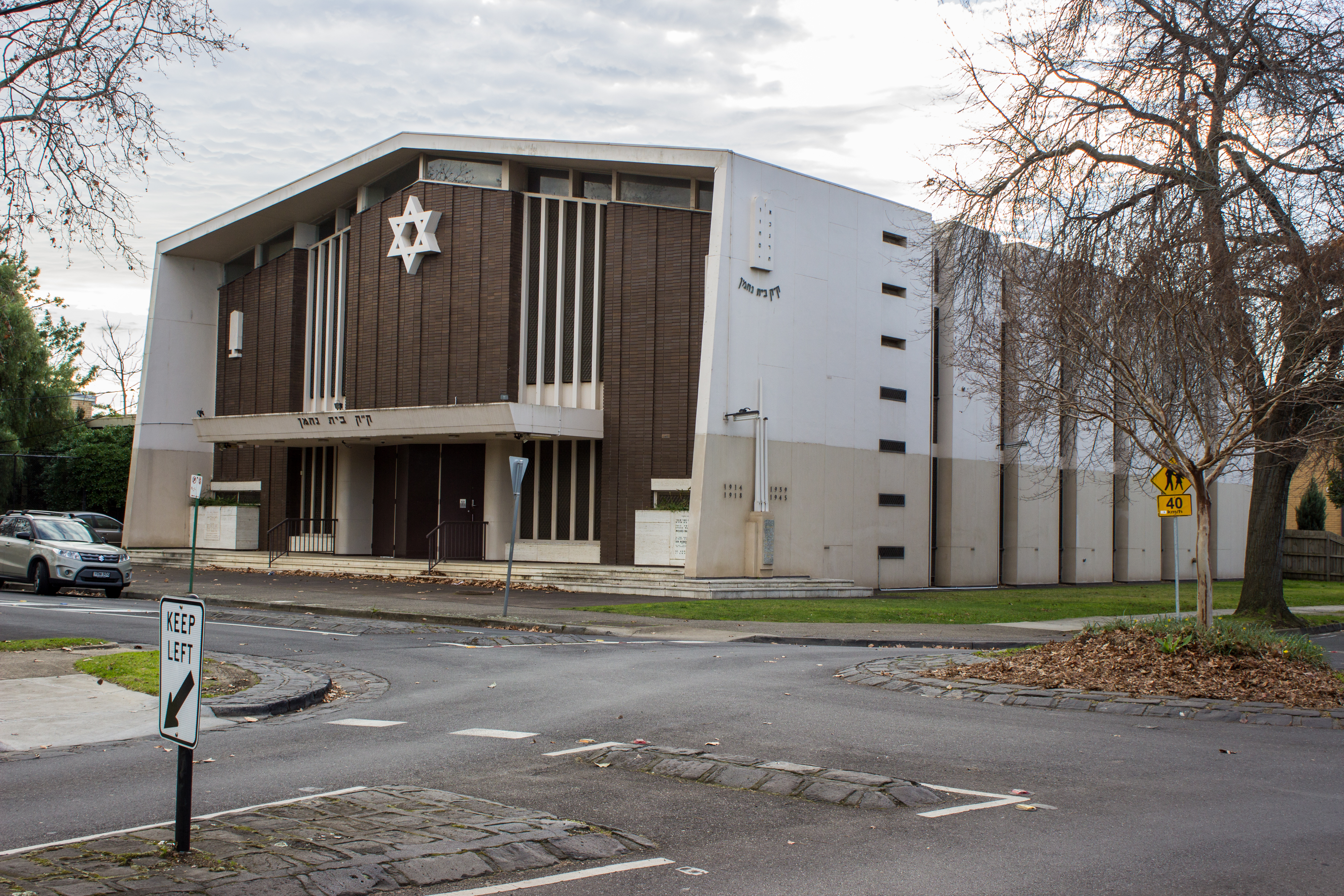
The site of the Kew Hebrew Congregation in Melbourne's eastern suburbs was purchased by Norman Smorgon in 1949.

The Smorgon family originates from the small town of Heidelberg (now known as Pryshyb), in eastern Ukraine.

Norman (Naum) Smorgon, patriarch of the family, was born in Heidelberg in 1884 to Gershon and Leah Smorgon. He married Tzippa Mejov at Blumental in 1908. The couple opened a mixed goods store the following year (1909). During their time in Heidelberg they had four children; Annia (1909), Eric (Ishay) (1911), Victor (Abrasha) (1913) and Clara (1914).

In 1918 the Smorgons moved to Bolshov Tokmak to escape the violence of the Russian Revolution of 1917. There, Norman and his youngest brother, Isak, established a tannery. Their brothers, Abram and Moisey, worked in the meat trade supplying cattle for the Red Army. When pressure from the White Army forced Norman and Isak to close, the four brothers opened a small flour mill.

Due to the continuing violence and anti-Semitism of the Russian Civil War, the Smorgon family then moved to Mariupol. Here, Norman and his brothers re-established their flour mill. During this time, Tzippa, Norman’s wife, suffered ongoing health conditions of bleeding ulcers and paralysis. She moved to stay with her mother in Cherna (Chernivitsi), Melitopol.

Vladimir Lenin’s death in 1924 and the rise of Joseph Stalin prompted Norman to immigrate to Australia, following his relatives Ruvin and Bertha. In 1925, Norman divorced Tzippa and married the family’s governess, Vera Naumovna Feldman, so that she could obtain a travel permit too. The Smorgon family travelled from Mariupol to Marseilles where they boarded a converted French cattle ship taking passengers to Australia.The Smorgons arrived in Melbourne, Australia in 1927 and settled in the suburb of Carlton.

== Sources of wealth ==
=== Kosher butcheries ===
In 1927, Norman Smorgon opened a kosher butcher shop in Melbourne on 366 Lygon Street, Carlton. Carlton was the centre of a Yiddish community that was growing with influxes of Jewish immigrants from Eastern Europe. For this Jewish community of up to 15 000 people, there were only 2 butcher shops in Melbourne supplying kosher meat. Norman recognised the high demand for kosher meat and went into business with his brothers, Abram and Moses. The shop was successful and prompted the brothers to open more butcher shops over the years.

=== Wholesale meat ===
In 1934, Victor Smorgon began a wholesale meat business, Vic Smorgon and Co., which acted as a wholesaling arm for his father and uncle’s butcheries. Norman Smorgon then decided to go into business with his sons, Victor and Eric. Together they established a new wholesale meat business, Norman Smorgon and Sons, separate from the butcheries. This broke the partnership between Norman, Adam and Moses Smorgon. Adam and Moses were left with two butcheries in Richmond.

=== Meat exporting ===
The business, Norman Smorgon and Sons, began exporting meat to England using the export license of the London firm, Mickie and White.

In 1939, Victor Smorgon met with Ben Chifley, then treasurer of Australia, to discuss the building of an abattoir at the Smorgon’s new Brooklyn facility. Victor asked for 750 pounds and a license to export meat to the United Kingdom which Chiefly granted. The building of the Smorgon's new meat processing plant in Brooklyn, Melbourne was completed in 1945. The facility housed a slaughterhouse, cannery, freezers, boilers and boning rooms which allowed the Smorgons to streamline their business operations. This also housed their patented Freezer Chain System, developed by Eric Smorgon.

By 1956, the Smorgons had expanded into a new meat works in Dinmore, Queensland and had a large stake of the Australian export market. During the 1970s, Smorgon Consolidated Industries, the conglomerate family business formed in 1958, bought three abattoirs in Inverell, Mareeba and Perth.

In April 1983, the Smorgons closed their original Brooklyn meat processing plant. The Smorgon’s abattoir in Mareeba, Queensland was absorbed into a joint venture called Australian Meat Holdings. To save their meat processing business, Smorgon Consolidated Industries bought two new plants in 1983. Their abattoir in Richmond Council had to close just 18 months after opening. Their last abattoir, located in Melbourne, closed after workers went on strike 24 times in its 64-day operating period.

=== Rabbit meat ===
In 1946, Victor and Sam Smorgon started exporting rabbit meat to England after Victor noticed a demand for rabbit exports at London’s Smithfield Market. In 1948, the Smorgons began to supply rabbit meat to the US. Rabbit became the Smorgons most profitable operation where Australians consumed 27 million rabbits annually during the 1940s and were exporting over 50 million rabbits by the end of the 1940s.

In the early 1960s, the introduction of the disease myxomatosis by the Australian Government to cull rabbit overpopulation, led to decreased supply for the Smorgons. As a result, they ended their rabbit meat operations.

=== Canning ===
While exporting meat, Norman Smorgon rented a factory near the Melbourne Meat Market where he canned the cuts of meat that weren’t fit to be sold to England raw. In 1948, Sam Smorgon and Jack Morris began to use the Smorgon canning facilities to sell canned fruit. They then branched into selling canned vegetables, soups, sauces and spaghetti. In 1967, the Smorgons exited the fruit cannery business due to cheap South African products lowering the cost of goods in the UK.

=== Paper ===
In response to the establishment of the European Economic Community in 1957 that threatened the Smorgon’s exports with competition from European meat suppliers, Victor Smorgon diversified the company’s operations into paper production.

Smorgon Consolidated Industries competed against the paper monopoly, Australian Paper Manufacturers (APM). They added machinery to their existing Brooklyn factory and produced paper and carton materials. To compete with APM, the Smorgons decided to start producing boxes as part of a vertical integration of their paper business.

The family got into a legal dispute with APM as both businesses sought to purchase shares in the public packaging company, Fibre Containers Ltd. In 1984, Smorgon Consolidated Industries won the rights to supply 64% of Fibre Containers' paper, making the purchase of the company by APM less desirable. The Smorgons purchased the company shares, having spent $53 million to complete this vertical integration of their paper business.

In the early 1980s, Loti and Victor Smorgon began living in New York. The family used this opportunity to invest in American business and purchased a newsprint mill in Chicago. They then built a tissue plant alongside this factory.

From 1988 to 1989 APM (known as Amcor from 1986) drastically lowered box prices and raised charges for feedstock paper to capture more of the market. As a result, the Smorgon paper industry started making losses. The family decided to sell this business. Three box plants were purchased by Amcor and Richard Pratt, another market competitor, purchased two.

=== Property ===
The Smorgon family used capital from Smorgon Consolidated Industries to invest in property in the United States. The goal of this was to provide income for all family shareholders, giving non-working family members financial stability too. For 12 years, Victor and Loti Smorgon spent 6 months in the United States to head this operation where they invested in more than 25 properties. Victor Smorgon and friend, Ron Altman, also became limited partners in major projects with developers.

=== Glass ===
In 1982, David Smorgon purchased the Australian subsidiary of a Canadian packaging company, Glass Containers, which made glass and plastic packaging. This purchase put them in competition with the large company, Australian Consolidated Industries. The business secured the Smorgons 25% of the glass packaging market and 50% of the plastic bottle market.

In 1989, Smorgon Consolidated Industries sold its corrugated-box plants to Amcor and the Pratt Group and its Humes plastics business to James Hardie. In November 1990, their glass containers business was sold to BTR Nylex, an Australian Consolidated Industries subsidiary. In the 1995 company breakup, the remaining plastic containers business was sold to industrial conglomerate, Southcorp.

=== Steel ===
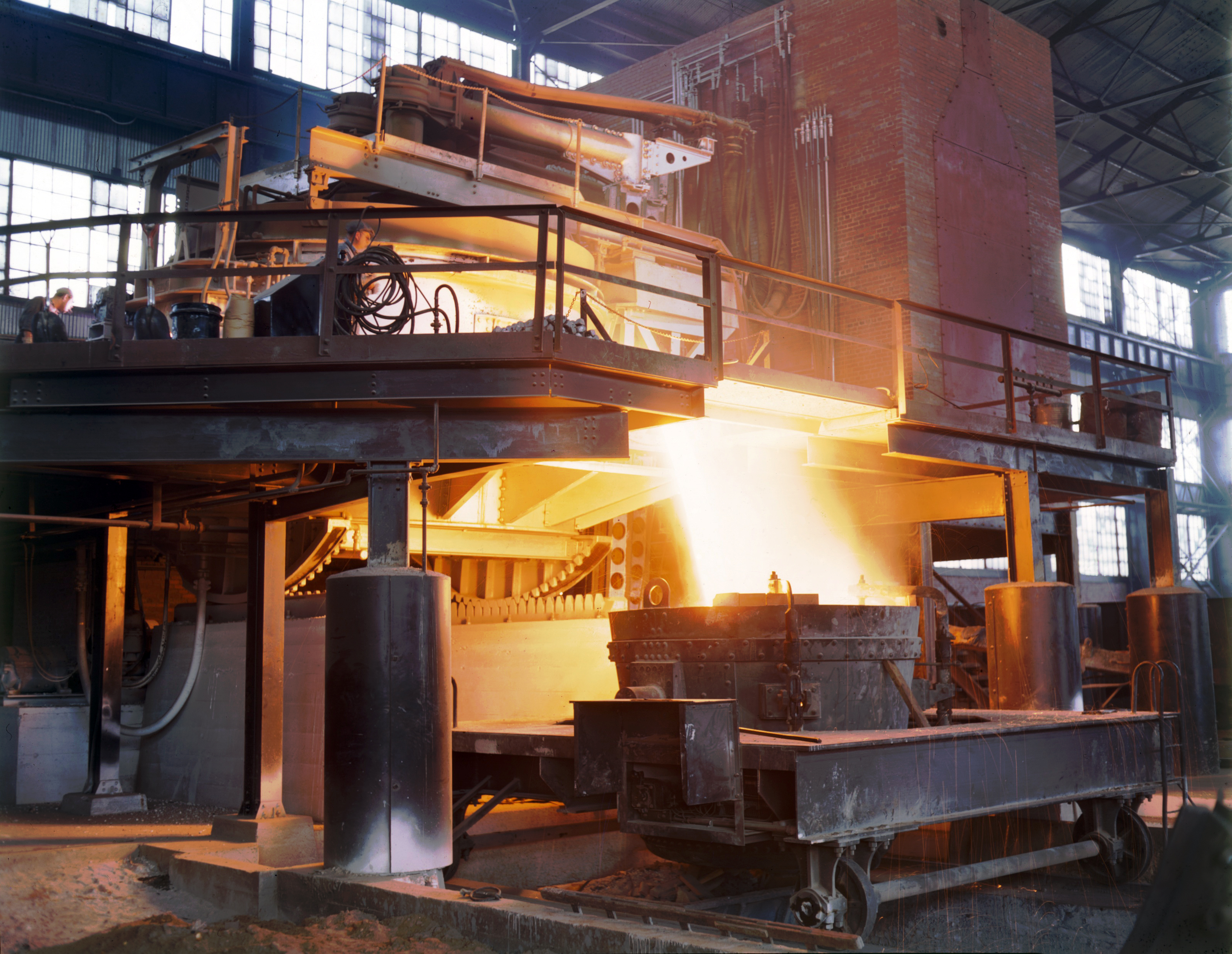
Melted steel pouring from an electric-arc furnace.

The Smorgon family saw an opportunity to capitalise on the monopoly industry of steel. BHP controlled Australia’s steel market in the 1980s. Since 1930, BHP had been Australia’s largest industrial company and by the 1980s, it was producing 2% of Australia’s GDP and 9% of its exports.

However, BHP had fluctuating profits as it was yet to adopt the new and efficient steel technology of electric-arc furnaces, also known as the mini-mill. The mini-mill used electricity to melt scrap metals into steel billets. This process increased product quality and factory productivity compared to traditional blast furnace production methods. Victor Smorgon partnered with David Holckner and began researching this new manufacturing method by visiting steel mills in the US. They originally had plans to export steel to South-East Asia but, when the foreign steel market collapsed, the family decided to compete with BHP’s domestic market instead.

They began constructing the electric mini-mill in Laverton, Melbourne in 1981. The Smorgons started steel production in the first quarter of 1983. In January 1984, they diversified their product by purchasing a used rolling mill and rolling steel billets into reinforced bar. The Smorgons offered lower prices, distributed directly to customers and adapted their production schedules to suit their client’s needs. Through this strategy, they secured major building materials manufacturers such as ARC, Aquila and Boral, as clients.

To vertically integrate their steel business, the Smorgons sold their steel operations to Humes Ltd in 1987. Humes Ltd was a client of the Smorgons and ran a steel product production and distribution operation under the name ARC. The Smorgons sold their steel operations for a 46% stake in Humes Ltd, valued at $346 million at the time. In 1988, the Smorgons then purchased Humes Ltd outright for $2.90 a share, paying approximately $375 million. They sold off the company’s building products operations and produced steel under the names of ARC and Australian Tube Mills.

In 1995, Smorgon Consolidated Industries divested itself of all assets except for their steel business. The company was renamed Smorgon Steel. On 3 February 1999, the company listed on the Australian Securities Exchange and 33% was sold to new investors. The family retained 67% and still had members on the board and Graham Smorgon as the board chairman.

In 1998, the company bought out Australian National Industries for its steel operations and in 2000 they purchased NSW’s leading scrap metal recycler, Metalcorp. In 2001, Smorgon Steel purchased Palmer Tube Mills and joined OneSteel in a partnership to acquire Email Ltd. The steel products distributor, Albion Steel Group, was purchased by Smorgon Steel in 2002. In 2003, Smorgon Steel acquired a 50% stake in the Hong Kong company, Hartwell Pacific Ltd, to export steel to foreign markets. In September the same year, the company bought Chantlers Metal Recyclers, the second largest scrap dealer in Sydney. During this time, members of the Smorgon family began to sell their shares in the company, reducing the family’s shareholding position. Smorgon Steel was sold to OneSteel in 2007.

== Divestment of assets ==
In December 1994, Victor Smorgon stepped down as chairman of Smorgon Consolidated Industries along with Sam and Eric Smorgon and Charlie Holckner. The new board consisted of the younger family generation with George Castan, David Smorgon, Raymond Orloff, David Holckner, Robert Smorgon and Leslie Green. Graham Smorgon became the new chairman.

In February 1995, the new board decided to divest the Smorgon family of their conglomerate, Smorgon Consolidated Industries. Smorgon Consolidated Industries had a complex shareholder structure of over 100 members from seven distinct family groups and so the aim of this move was to sell many of the company businesses so that all members could profit. At the time of the breakup, Smorgon Consolidated Industries employed over 400 people, operated companies in steel, meat, plastic containers, paper mills and recycling and was worth $1.5 billion. By August 1995, the meat, plastic containers, paper mills and recycling businesses were sold. Smorgon Consolidated Industries also sold the property portfolio of Victor Smorgon and Ron Altman and Victor and Loti Smorgon’s American Contemporary Art collection as these were purchased using the company’s finances. No family member could purchase the company assets for sale with the exception of Victor Smorgon who retained a small plastic recycling plant.

After this period of sales, the family was left with their steel business, Smorgon Steel. After the company went public in 1999 the family still retained 67% but, over time, family members have sold their shares.

Members of the Smorgon family used the money from the Smorgon Consolidated Industries breakup to fund other ventures. The Victor Smorgon Group was created to run the plastics recycler, Vicfam, Smorgon Fuels, General Pants Co, publicly listed coal reclamation company Greenfields Coal Co, Hale Agency advertising group, and other ventures. Victor Smorgon became executive chairman with Peter Edwards as managing director and Victor’s four daughters, Ginny, Vicki, Bindy and Sandra, as directors. Eric Smorgon founded the Escor Group which originally specialised in cosmetics but has since invested in multiple industries. David Smorgon and his three sons, Dean, Ricky and Dale set up Generation Investments. David Smorgon also operated DBR Investments and DBR Corporation with his brothers Barry and Rodney which passively invested in equities, property, venture capital and offshore funds.

== Philanthropy ==
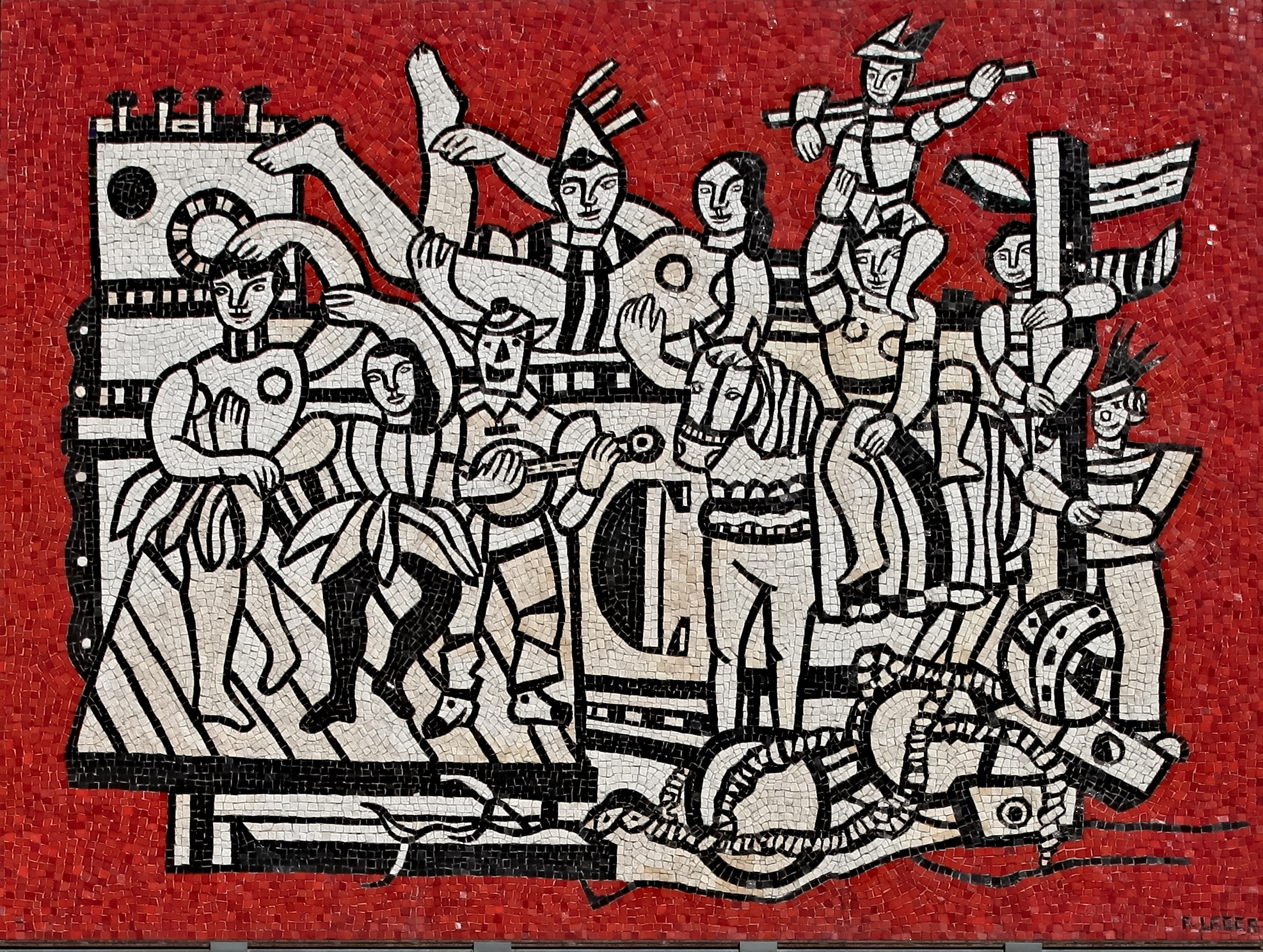
Fernand Léger, Grand Parade with red background (1958). Presented through the National Gallery of Victoria NGV Foundation by Loti Smorgon AO

The Smorgon family has various philanthropic foundations including the Victor Smorgon Foundation, Victor Smorgon Scholarship Fund, the Sandra and Barry Smorgon Family Charitable Trust, and the Jack and Robert Smorgon Families Foundation. Through these, the Smorgons provide funding to aid chronic illness, homelessness, refugees, child abuse and medical research. The Smorgon family has a wing named after them in the Peter MacCallum Cancer Centre and the Royal Victorian Eye and Ear Hospital. They are life trustees at the Mount Scopus Memorial College and donate $30 000 annually to the Premier’s Award for Health and Medical Research. Loti and Victor Smorgon are also supporters of the arts where they are benefactors of the Victorian Arts Centre, Melbourne Symphony Orchestra and have a Loti and Victor Smorgon Gallery at the National Gallery of Australia. In 1995, Loti Smorgon also donated her collection of 154 contemporary Australian artworks to Sydney’s Museum of Contemporary Art.
