= 2012 Western Bulldogs season =

Western Bulldogs
2012 season
- President: David Smorgon
- Coach: Brendan McCartney
- Captain: Matthew Boyd
- Home ground: Docklands Stadium

== 2012 NAB Cup ==
Round	Opposition	Time	Date	Home/Away	Venue	Score	Result/Margin
1	Collingwood	7:15 p.m.	Saturday 18 February 2012	Away	Blacktown International Sportspark	3.1 (19) v 4.2 (26)	Lost by 7 points.
1	Greater Western Sydney	7:15 p.m.	Saturday 18 February 2012	Away	Blacktown International Sportspark	1.3.3 (30) v 5.5 (35)	Won by 5 points.
2	Carlton	5:40 p.m.	Sunday 4 March 2012	Home	Etihad Stadium	11.8 (74) v 11.4 (70)	Won by 4 points
3	North Melbourne	3:40 p.m.	Sunday 11 March 2012	Away	Eureka Stadium	9.16 (70) v 1.11.18 (93)	Lost by 23 points
4	Geelong	3:00 p.m.	Saturday 17 March 2012	Away	Simonds Stadium	11.18 (84) v 11.9 (75)	Lost by 9 points

== 2012 Australian Football League season ==
Round	Date	Time	Opponent	Home or Away	Venue of Match	Result of Match	Score
1	Sunday 1 April 2012	1:10 p.m.	West Coast Eagles	Home	Etihad Stadium	Lost by 49 points	12.15(87) to 21.10(136)
2	Saturday 7 April 2012	7:10 p.m.	Adelaide	Away	AAMI Stadium	Lost by 18 points	11.16(82) to 9.10(64)
3	Saturday 14 April 2012	7:40 p.m.	St Kilda	Home	Etihad Stadium	Lost by 63 points	5.10(40) to 15.13(103)
4	Sunday 22 April 2012	4:40 p.m.	Melbourne	Away	M.C.G.	Won by 21 points	9.13(67) to 13.10(88)
5	Saturday 28 April 2012	2:10 p.m.	Greater Western Sydney	Away	Manuka Oval	Won by 42 points	9.8(62) to 15.14(104)
6	Friday 4 May 2012	7:50 p.m.	Collingwood	Home	Etihad Stadium	Lost by 21 points	11.11(77) to 15.8(98)
7	Sunday 13 May 2012	1:10 p.m.	North Melbourne	Away	Etihad Stadium	WON by 18 points	15.11(101) to 12.11(83)
8	Saturday 19 May 2012	7:10 p.m.	Gold Coast	Home	TIO Stadium	WON by 38 points	9.18(72) to 4.10(34)
9	Friday 25 May 2012	7:50 p.m.	Geelong	Home	Etihad Stadium	LOST by 20 points	11.9(75) to 14.11(95)
10	Sunday 3 June 2012	3:15 p.m.	Sydney	Away	Sydney Cricket Ground	LOST by 92 points	20.12(132) to 5.10(40)
11 - BYE							
12	Sunday 17 June 2012	4:40 p.m.	Port Adelaide	Home	Etihad Stadium	WON by 38 points	13.17(95) to 8.9(57)
13	Saturday 23 June 2012	2:10 p.m.	Brisbane Lions	Home	Etihad Stadium	LOST by 58 points	18.6(114) to 7.14(56)
14	Saturday 30 June 2012	7:40 p.m.	Essendon	Away	Etihad Stadium	LOST by 84 points	21.14 (140) to 8.8(56)
15	Sunday 8 July 2012	2:40 p.m.	Fremantle	Away	Patersons Stadium	LOST by 38 points	14.11(95) to 8.9(57)
16	Sunday 15 July 2012	3:15 p.m.	Hawthorn	Home	Etihad Stadium	LOST by 72 points	17.14(116) to 6.8(44)
17	Saturday 21 July 2012	7:40 p.m.	Carlton	Home	Etihad Stadium	LOST by 18 points	16.6(102) to 12.12(84)
18	Sunday 29 July 2012	3:15 p.m.	St Kilda	Away	Etihad Stadium	LOST by 76 points	16.22(118) to 6.6(42)
19	Saturday 4 August 2012	1:45 p.m.	North Melbourne	Home	Etihad Stadium	LOST by 54 points	18.7(115) to 8.13(61)
20	Sunday 12 August 2012	3:15 p.m.	Richmond	Away	M.C.G.	LOST by 70 points	22.18(150) to 12.8(80)
21	Sunday 19 August 2012	3:15 p.m.	Sydney	Home	Etihad Stadium	LOST by 82 points	26.11(167) to 13.7(85)
22	Sunday 26 August 2012	1:10 p.m.	Geelong	Away	Simonds Stadium	LOST by 34 points	16.11(107) to 11.7(73)
23	Sunday 2 September 2012	4:40 p.m.	Brisbane Lions	Away	The Gabba	LOST by 67 points	19.14(128) to 9.7(61)

== See also ==
- 2012 AFL season
