= Ian Collins (footballer) =

Australian rules footballer

Personal information
- Full name: Ian Collins
- Born: 24 October 1942 (age 84)
- Original team: Sale
- Height: 175 cm (5 ft 9 in)
- Weight: 74 kg (163 lb) (during AFL Career)

Playing career^{1}
Years	Club	Games (Goals)
1961–1971	Carlton	161 (49)
1972-1973	Port Melbourne Football Club	20 (17)
Total		181 (66)
- ^{1} Playing statistics correct to the end of 1971.

Career highlights
- 1968 Carlton premiership player

Ian "Collo" Collins AM (born 24 October 1942) is a high-profile businessman and former Australian rules footballer.

== Playing career ==
=== Carlton ===
Collins played for the Carlton Football Club in the Victorian Football League between 1961 and 1971 for a total of 161 games and kicked 49 goals. He was part of the 1968 premiership side. but he missed the entire 1970 premiership winning season due to an achilles injury. He returned in 1971. Collins played as a tough back-pocket player in the back line and was recruited from Sale.

== Coaching career ==
=== Port Melbourne Football Club (VFA) ===
Collins had a coaching stint as captain and senior coach of Port Melbourne Football Club in the VFA from 1972 until the end of the 1973 season. where one of his players was his former senior coach at Carlton Ron Barassi, then Collins hung up his boots for good as senior coach of Port Melbourne to prepare for bigger things and to move on with other endeavours.

== Sports Administration career ==
=== Chief Executive Officer (CEO) of Carlton Football Club ===
Collins became the Carlton Football Club's chief executive officer (CEO) from 1981 until 1993, during his tenure as CEO of Carlton, Collins oversaw Carlton's three premiership victories in 1981, 1982 and 1987.

=== Australian Football League's Director of Football Operations ===
In 1993, Collins became the Australian Football League's Director of Football Operations, a position he held until 1999.

=== Chief Executive Officer (CEO) of Docklands Stadium ===
In 1999, Collins became the CEO of Docklands Stadium, a position he held until 2 October 2012.

=== Carlton Football Club President ===
Collins became the President of the Carlton Football Club, following John Elliott's departure on 13 November 2002. Collins in his tenure as President of Carlton, oversaw himself to work hard with the board of the club to limit the damage to Carlton's profile, prestige and financial position during a rough time for the club, due to the effects and penalties of the club's salary cap breaches and the poor on-field results for the club that followed on. Collins thereby served an unstable tenure as President of the club, because Carlton still struggled to maintain off-field stability with the club still remaining in seven million dollar club debt. On 13 April 2006, Collins announced he would step down as president of the Carlton Football Club due to ill health and by the pressures of juggling two demanding jobs between his time as Carlton Football Club President and his time as CEO of Docklands Stadium. He was replaced by Graham Smorgon.
