= Tata Hitachi Construction Machinery =

Indian construction equipment company

Tata Hitachi Construction Machinery Company (THCMC) Pvt Ltd
- Type: Joint venture
- Industry: Construction
- Founded: 1961; 65 years ago
- Headquarters: Bengaluru (Bangalore), Bangalore Urban, Karnataka, India
- Key people: Sandeep Singh (Managing Director)
- Products: Construction Equipment
- Owner: Hitachi Construction Machinery (60%); Tata Motors (40%)
- Website: https://www.tatahitachi.co.in

Tata Hitachi Construction Machinery Company Pvt Ltd or THCMC is an India-based joint venture company between Tata Motors of India (40%) and Hitachi Construction Machinery of Japan (60%). It was previously known as Telco Construction Equipment Co. Ltd. or Telcon for short.

Tata Hitachi's product lineup includes a wide range of excavators: from 2T – 800T Excavators, 35T to 290T Rigid dump trucks, Wheel Loaders and Backhoe Loaders. Tata Hitachi has two manufacturing facilities at Dharwad – Karnataka and Kharagpur – West Bengal.

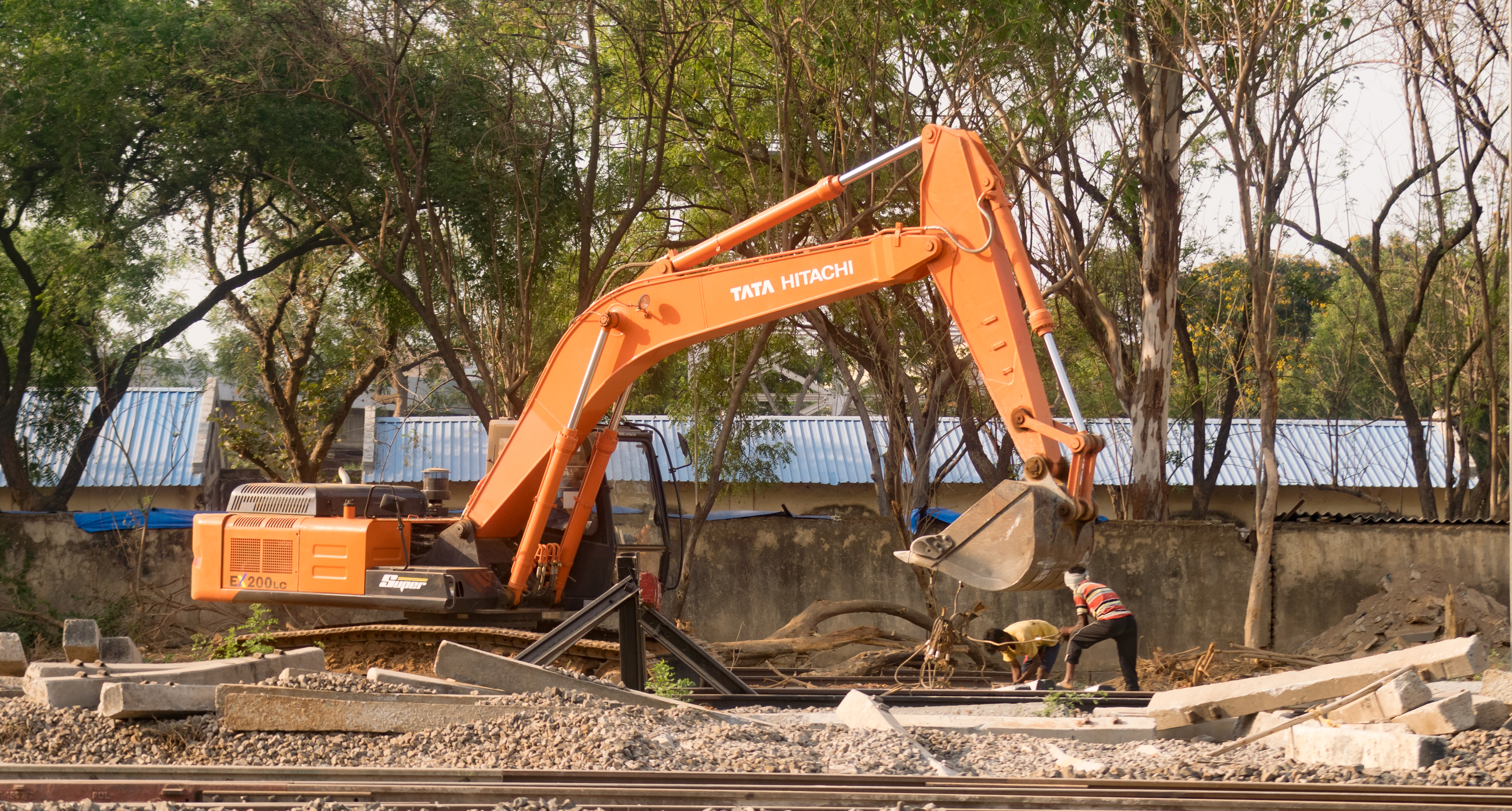
TATA Hitachi excavator at work in Hyderabad

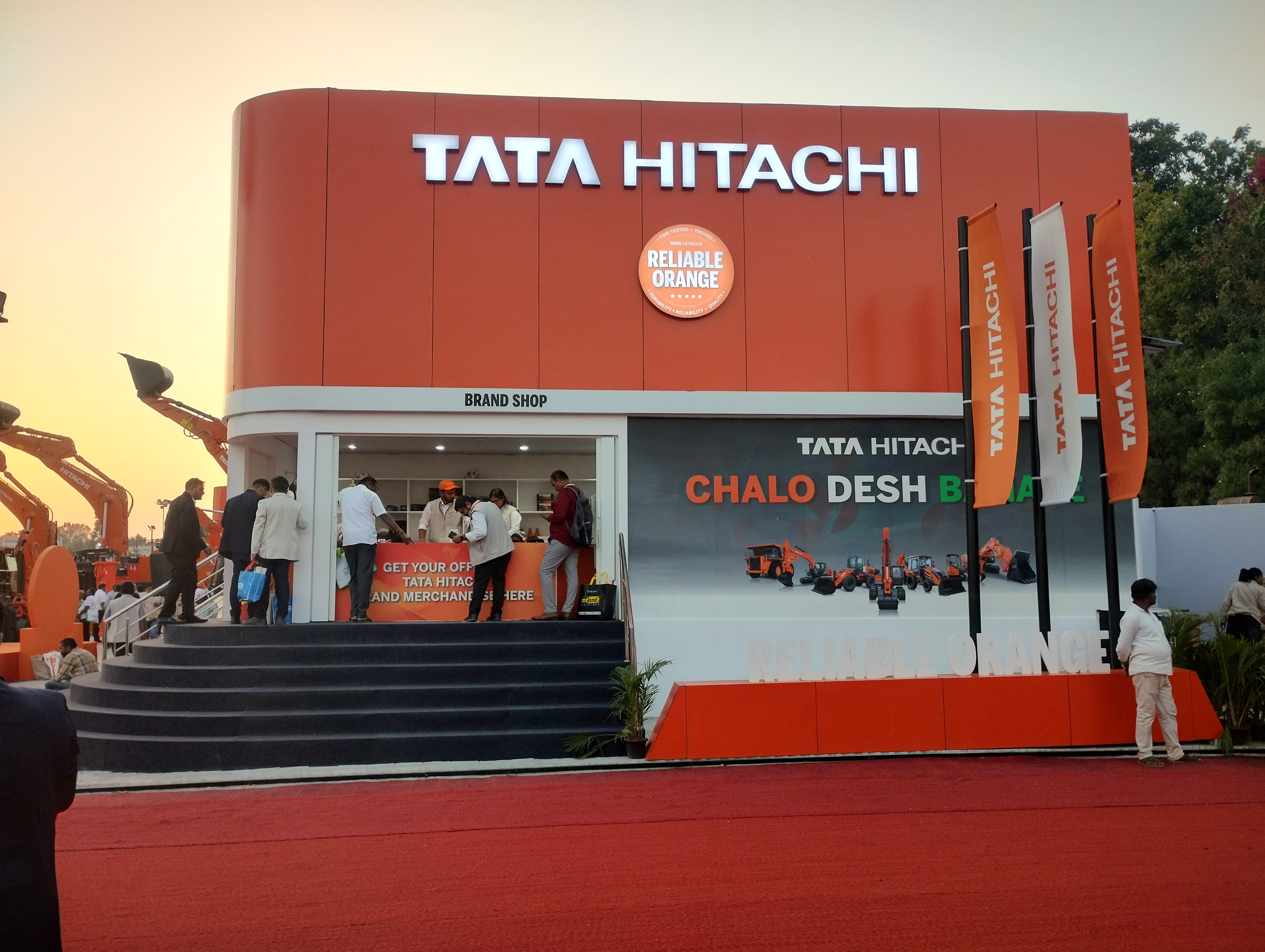
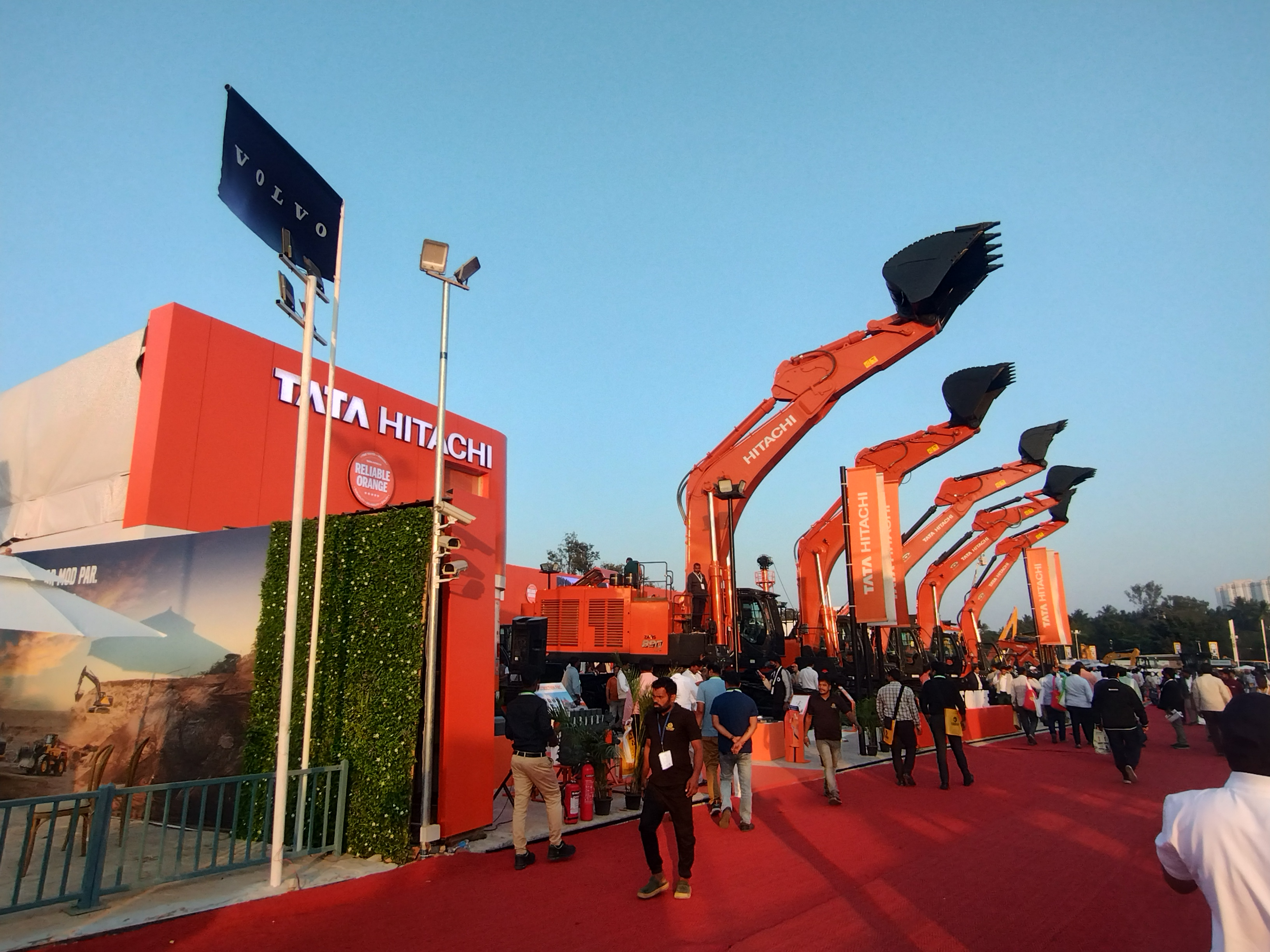
Tata Hitachi at EXCON 2025, BIEC

== History ==
The company commenced manufacturing of construction equipment in 1961, as a division of TATA Engineering and Locomotive Company (TELCO), now TATA Motors at its Jamshedpur plant. In 1984, it entered into a technical collaboration with Hitachi Construction Machinery for manufacturing hydraulic excavators. In 2000, HCM acquired a 20% stake in JV, which increased to 40% in 2005 and currently stands at 60%. The company has been known to offer the largest range of Hydraulic excavators under a single brand in India. It currently has manufacturing plants at Kharagpur (West Bengal) and Dharwad (Karnataka).

== Milestones ==
1961: Telco (now Tata Motors) started the Construction Equipment Division. First excavator rolled out.

1984: Collaboration with Hitachi Construction Machinery for the manufacture of Hydraulic Excavators.

1985: The first Hydraulic Excavator UH083 launched.

1994: Construction Equipment Business Unit (CEBU) formed. EX70 Excavator Launched.

1998: New Manufacturing Facility set up at Dharwad.

1999: CEBU converted into a separate company – Telcon.

2000: Tata Motors and HCM sign JV for 80:20 stake in Telcon.

2009: New Manufacturing Facility set up at Kharagpur.

2010: New JV between Tata Motors and Hitachi with 40:60 stake.

2012: Name changed from Telcon to Tata Hitachi.

2018: Launch of the all new Backhoe Loader – Tata Hitachi Shinrai.

2019: The Dharwad plant Administrative Block receives the Gold Rating under IGBC's LEED New Construction Rating System.

== Manufacturing facilities ==
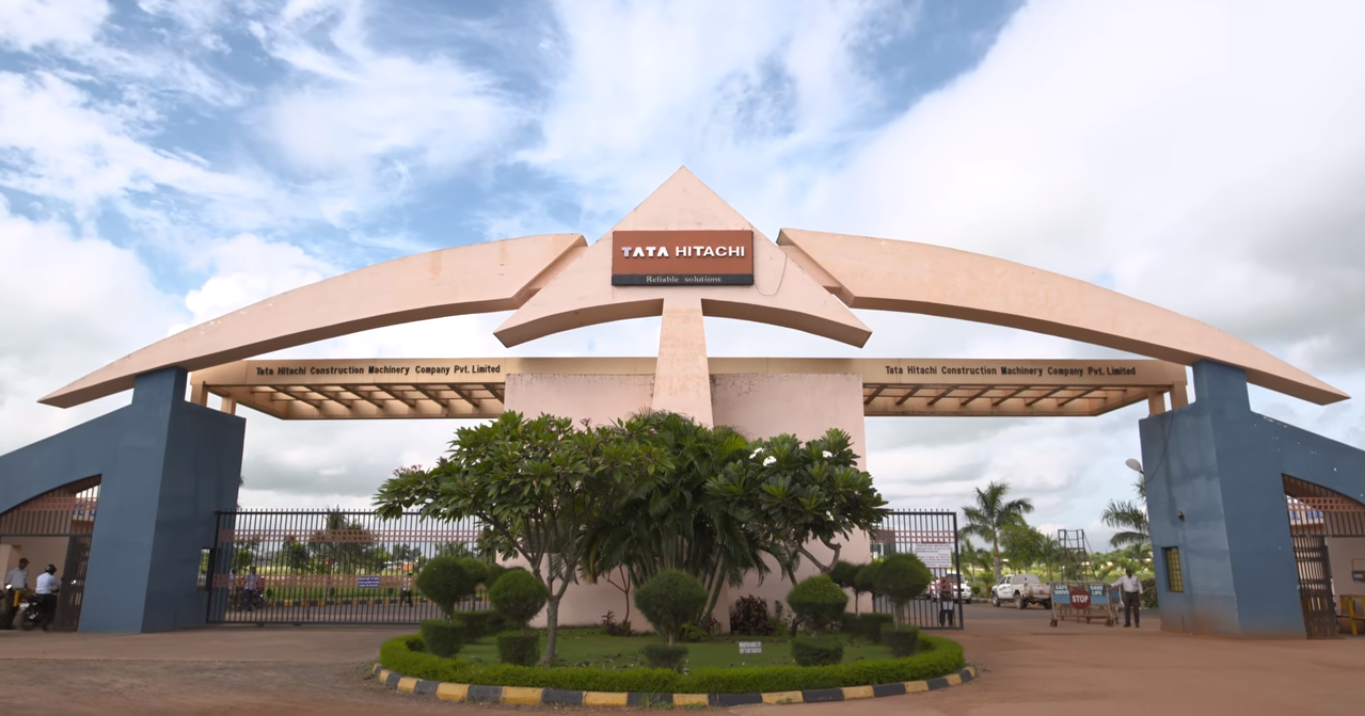
Entrance gate of Tata Hitachi Construction facility at Vidyasagar Industrial Park Kharagpur

Tata Hitachi has two plants – Dharwad – Karnataka and Kharagpur – West Bengal.

Set up in 1961, the oldest plant of Tata Hitachi at Jamshedpur manufactures large class excavators. Equipped with facilities from material preparation, fabrication, machining, shot blasting and painting right through to assembly. This plant houses equipment such as robot's and CNC machines.

The Dharwad plant has been operational since 1999. The plant manufactures excavators up to 20T and Backhoe Loaders

The Kharagpur plant was set up in 2009 and manufactures 20T class excavators, Wheel Loaders and Dump Trucks

A spare parts warehouse and Service Training facilities are integrated with both the plants to cater to Dealer and Customer requirements.
