= Hitachi Construction Machinery =

Japanese construction equipment company

Hitachi Construction Machinery Co., Ltd.
- Native name: 日立建機株式会社
- Type: Public (K.K)
- Traded as: TYO: 6305
- Industry: Machinery
- Founded: January 30, 1951
- Founder: Hitachi
- Headquarters: 16-1, Higashiueno 2-chome, Taito-ku, Tokyo, Japan
- Area served: Worldwide
- Key people: Kotaro Hirano (President)
- Products: Mining and Construction equipment
- Revenue: ▼¥753.947 billion (2017)
- Operating income: ▼¥23.622 billion (2017)
- Net income: ▼¥8.022 billion (2017)
- Total assets: ▲¥999.601 billion (2017)
- Total equity: ▼¥399.619 billion (2017)
- Number of employees: 21,814 (2012)
- Website: www.hitachicm.com

Hitachi Construction Machinery Co., Ltd. (日立建機株式会社) is a Japanese construction equipment company which is into the manufacturing, sales and service of construction machinery, transportation machinery, and other machines and devices. It was spun off from Hitachi in 1970. In August 2026, Hitachi sold its remaining shares with the company to be rebranded as Landcros in 2027.

== History ==
Hitachi Construction Machinery Co., Ltd. was formally established on 1 October 1970 through the merger of Hitachi Construction Machinery Manufacturing Co., Ltd. and the (former) Hitachi Construction Machinery Co., Ltd., with an initial capital of ¥3.8 billion.

The origins of the company, however, trace back to earlier construction machinery activities within the Hitachi Group. In December 1955, Hitachi Construction Machinery Service Co., Ltd. was established as a subsidiary of Hitachi, Ltd. In April 1965, this company was incorporated together with the construction machinery sales divisions of Hitachi, Ltd., resulting in the formation of the first Hitachi Construction Machinery Co., Ltd.

In November 1969, Hitachi, Ltd.'s construction machinery manufacturing division was spun off and reorganized as Hitachi Construction Machinery Manufacturing Co., Ltd., with production facilities in Adachi and Tsuchiura. These restructuring steps culminated in the October 1970 merger that created the present company.

In October 1973, the company merged with Sagami Kogyo Co., Ltd. (established on 30 January 1951), resulting in a change to the par value of shares and an increase in capital to ¥3.85 billion.

=== International expansion (1970s–1990s) ===
Beginning in the 1970s, the company expanded internationally. In 1972, Hitachi Construction Machinery (Europe) N.V. was established in the Netherlands. Subsequent decades saw the creation of operations and subsidiaries in Singapore (1984), the United States (1988, through Deere-Hitachi Construction Machinery Corp.), Indonesia (1991), China (1995), and Canada (1998).

The company was listed on the Second Section of the Tokyo Stock Exchange in December 1981 and moved to the First Section in September 1989. It was also listed on the First Section of the Osaka Securities Exchange in January 1990.

=== Consolidation and acquisitions (2000–present) ===
During the 2000s and 2010s, Hitachi Construction Machinery strengthened its global position through strategic joint ventures, acquisitions, and internal restructuring. In 2002, Sumitomo Heavy Industries Construction Cranes Co., Ltd. was established as a joint venture. In 2010, the company acquired management rights in Tata Hitachi Construction Machinery Co., Pvt., Ltd. in India.

Notable acquisitions included Wenco International Mining Systems. (2009), H-E Parts International (2016), and Bradken (2017) expanding the company's presence in the mining equipment and aftermarket parts sectors.

At the same time, the company carried out multiple internal reorganizations, including mergers of subsidiaries, transfers of business operations, and rationalization of manufacturing and logistics structures.

In January 2022, the parent company, Hitachi, sold 26 percent of its remaining 51% stake to Itochu.

In October 2025, the company's board announced that the company will change be rebrandws Landcros in April 2027. The board further indicated that appropriate changes to the company's articles or incorporation will be brought to a board meeting in June 2026.

In December 2025, the company announced that it was launching Landcros Development Center Europe GmbH in Germany as of 1 January 2026. This new research hub will focus on battery-powered excavators and other technology solutions. It is also the first corporate entity to use the company's new Landcros name.

In August 2026, Hitachi sold its remaining 10.1% voting stake, ending Hitachi's equity ownership in the company. The companies said they would continue cooperating in areas including digital and autonomous-operation technologies, electrification and parts supply.

== Products ==
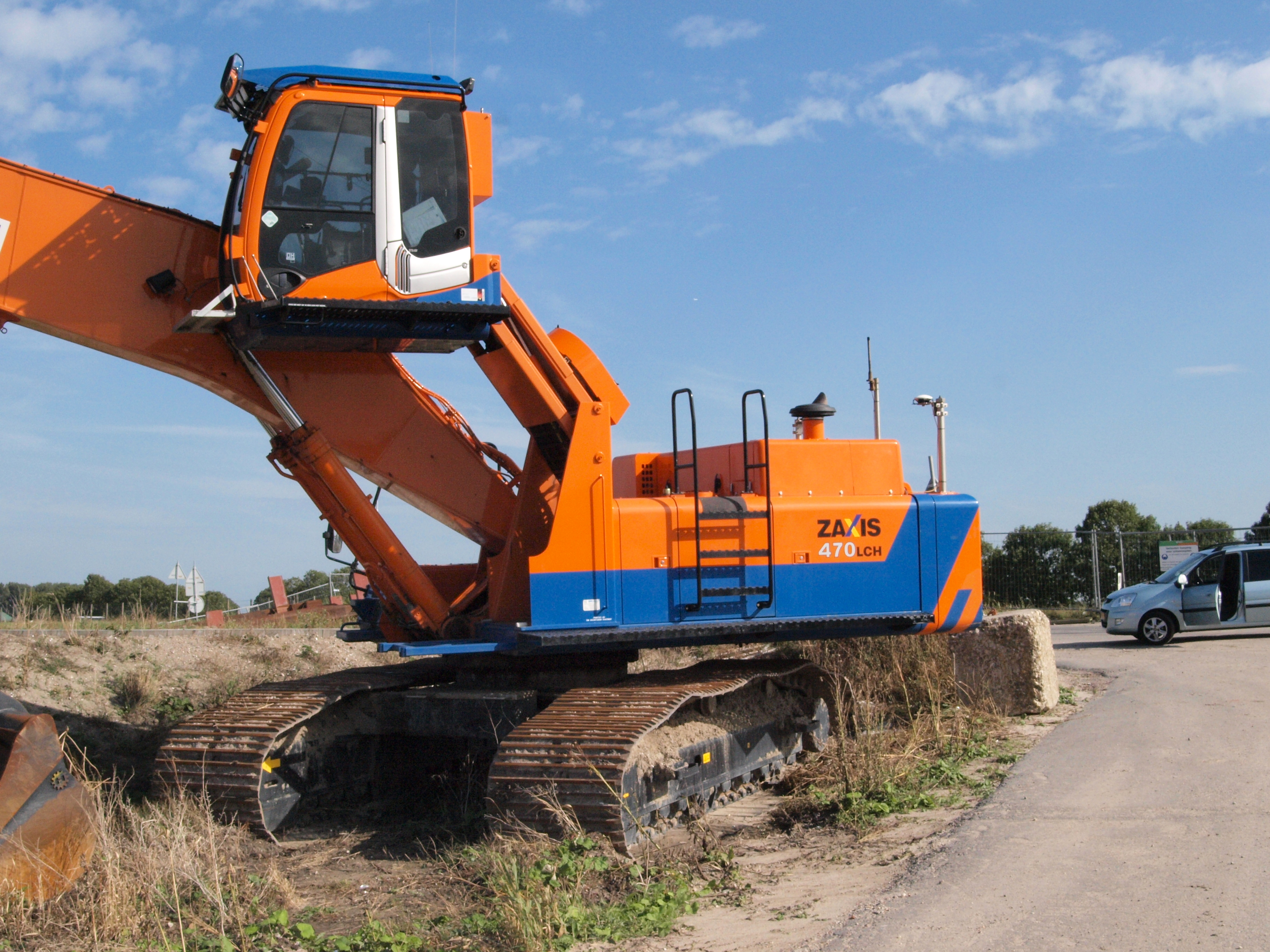
Hitachi Zaxis 470 LCH

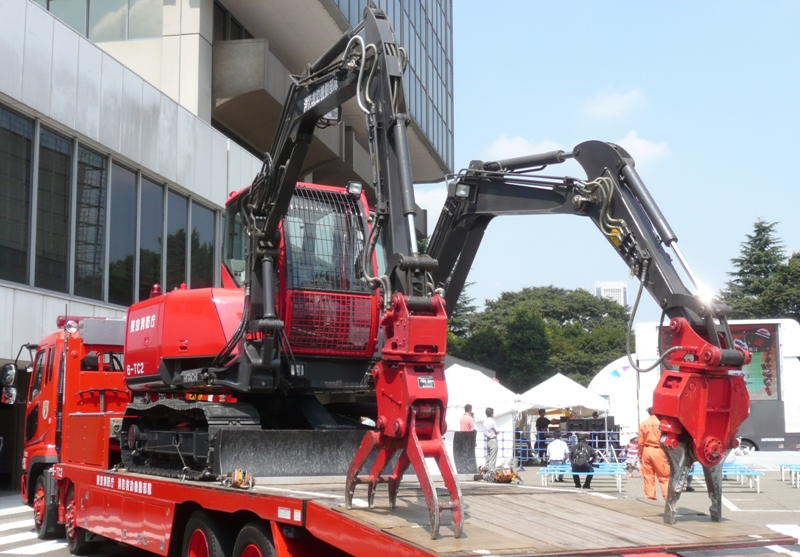
Double front work machine ASTACO (Tokyo Fire Department)

=== Current products ===
Medium Excavators
	Engine rated out power (ISO 14396)	Operating weight	Bucket capacity (ISO 7451)
ZX350-7G class	120 kW	19 800 - 21 600 kg	0.8 - 1.1 m^{3}
ZX210-7G class	200 kW	31 900 - 34 800 kg	1.38 - 1.86 m^{3}

Large Excavators
	Engine rated out power (ISO 14396)	Operating weight	Bucket capacity (ISO 7451)
ZX490-7G class	296 kW	46 500 - 49 000 kg	1.6 - 2.65 m^{3}
ZX690LC-7G class	345 kW	67 800 - 69 900 kg	2.5 - 3.5 m^{3}
ZX890-7G class	377 kW	81 700 - 85 300 kg	2.9 - 4.5 m^{3}

Rigid Dump Trucks
	Nominal payload (kg)	Gross machine operating weight (kg)	Engine Rated Power (kW)
EH5000AC-3	with Standard Equipment : 296 tonnes (326 tons)	500 000 kg (1,102,311 lb.)	Standard : Cummins QSKTTA60-CE : 2 125 kW (2 889 PS, 2 850 HP) / Optional : MTU 16V4000 C31 :2 125 kW (2 889 PS, 2 850 HP)
EH4000AC-3	with Standard Equipment : 221 tonnes (243.6 tons)	384 000 kg (846,575 lb.)	Standard : Cummins QSKTA60-CE : 1 864 kW (2 534 PS, 2 500 HP) / Optional : MTU 16V4000 C21 : 1 864 kW (2 534 PS, 2 500 HP)
EH3500AC-3	with Standard Equipment : 181 tonnes (200 tons)	322 000 kg (709,888 lb.)	Standard : Cummins QSKTA50-CE: 1 491 kW (2 027 PS, 2 000 HP) / Optional : MTU 12V4000 C21: 1 510 kW (2 053 PS, 2 025 HP)
EH4000AC-5	242 tonnes (267 tons)	422 tonnes (465 tons)	Standard: 1 864 kW (2 534 PS , 2 500 HP) Option: 2 013 kW (2 738 PS , 2 700 HP)

- Loaders
- Recycle machines
- Compaction equipment

=== Former products ===
- Excavators models ZX130-5G, ZX70-5G / ZX70LC-5G, ZX160LC-5G, ZX180LCN-5G, ZX200-5G / ZX200LC-5G, ZX210LCN-5А, ZX210H-5G / ZX210LCH-5G, ZX210K-5G / ZX210LCK-5G, ZX240-5G / ZX240LC-5G, ZX250H-5G / ZX250LCH-5G, ZX250K-5G / ZX250LCK-5G, ZX300-5A / ZX300LC-5A, ZX330-5G, ZX350H-5G / ZX350LCH-5G, ZX350K-5G / ZX350LCK-5G, ZX400LCH-5G
- Bulldozers
- Crawler cranes (models SCX550E, SCX700E и SCX1000A-3) - transferred to Hitachi Sumitomo Heavy Industries Construction Crane Co., Ltd.
- Excavators models UH- and EX- series

== Others ==
Hitachi Construction Machinery builds anti-personnel landmine removal equipment based on excavators. It is developed by Yamanashi Hitachi Construction Machinery Co., Ltd. under the leadership of Kiyoshi Amemiya, the president.

== Affiliated companies ==
Hitachi Construction Machinery (Europe) (Netherlands)
Tata Hitachi Construction Machinery (India)
Wenco International Mining Systems (Canada)
