= Bradken =

Manufacturing company

- Industry: Foundry, manufacturing
- Founded: 1920
- Founder: Leslie Bradford; Jim Kendall
- Headquarters: Mayfield West, New South Wales, Australia
- Area served: All
- Key people: Sean Winstone (CEO) Sandra Davis (CFO)
- Products: Metal castings, mining consumables
- Revenue: $819 million (2016)
- Parent: Hitachi Construction Machinery
- Website: www.bradken.com

Bradken is a manufacturer and supplier of differentiated consumable and capital products to the mining, transport, general industrial and contract manufacturing markets with operations in Australia, China, Canada, India, Malaysia and the United States. It is a subsidiary of Hitachi Construction Machinery.

== History ==
In 1919/1920, BHP steelworks employees, General Manager Leslie Bradford and Chief Mechanical Engineer Jim Kendall and a group of their friends backed a racehorse named Jack Findlay that completed a remarkable sequence of five wins. With each win the group rolled-over their bets and by 24 January 1920 they had won a small fortune pledging their winnings to start a steel foundry business.

On 28 April 1920, Bradford and Kendall used their winnings to establish the Alloy Steel Syndicate and build a steel foundry in Alexandria, Sydney. The syndicate was incorporated as Bradford Kendall Limited on 20 March 1922.

In 1926 Bradford Kendall began to manufacture railway couplers and undercarriages. In the 1930s it entered the export market, manufacturing dredge buckets for use in Malaysia. In 1948 the company was listed on the Sydney Stock Exchange. In the 1950s foundries were established in Adelaide, Brisbane, Fremantle and Wodonga. In 1970 a foundry was established in Port Hedland.

In December 1974 the company changed its name to Bradken. By 1978 Bradken was controlled by Australian National Industries (ANI) and Comeng. In 1982 ANI became the sole shareholder. In October 1990, the head office moved from Alexandra to Mayfield West. In 1995 the business was rebranded as ANI Bradken. The business was included in the January 1999 purchase of ANI by Smorgon Steel who sold the business to Castle Harlan Australian Mezzanine Partners.

In August 2004 Bradken was relisted on the Australian Securities Exchange. In November 2007 a new manufacturing facility opened in Xuzhou, China. In July 2009 the business of Americast Technologies in the United States was acquired.

In July 2011 Norcast Wear Solutions in Canada and SwanMet in Malaysia were purchased. In March 2013 Bradken opened a greenfield foundry development in Xuzhou, China following the construction of a manufacturing facility on the site in 2007. In October 2016 Hitachi Construction Machinery launched a takeover offer for Bradken. The transaction was completed in May 2017.

On June 10, 2021, it was announced that White Industries had acquired the Ipswich site operations, a strategic decision by its parent company Hitachi Manufacturing to move its operations to offshore facilities.
