= White Industries =

Australian foundry group

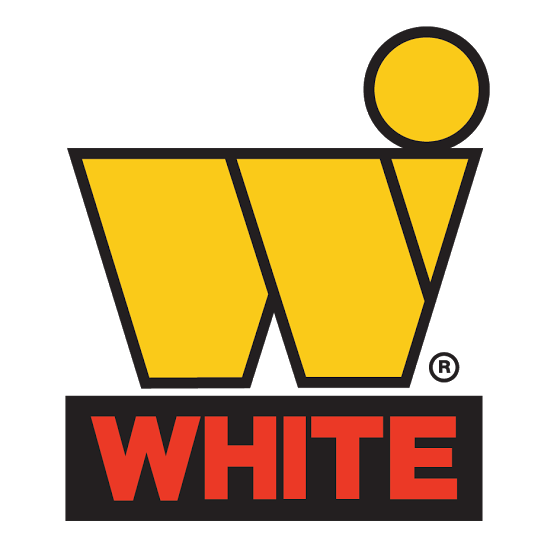
- Industry: Foundry, Manufacturing, Mining, CNC Machining
- Founded: 1960, Dalby Queensland
- Founders: Robert White; Wilf Hagen
- Headquarters: Dalby, Queensland; Ipswich, Queensland, Australia
- Key people: Michael Shelford (CEO); Bruce White (MD); Craig White (MD)
- Number of employees: 100-200
- Website: https://whiteindustries.com.au/

White Industries is an Australian family-owned foundry group headquartered in Queensland, with significant operations in both Dalby and Ipswich. It is the largest privately owned foundry group in Australia. Established in 1960 by Robert White, the company specialises in producing both ferrous and non-ferrous castings. Its products are used in various industries including mining, rail, water, road transport, agriculture, and automotive. In September 2017, White Industries was inducted into the Family Business Australia (FBA) Hall of Fame.

== History ==
=== White & Hagan ===
Robert (Bob) White was born in 1938 in Sydney. After completing his schooling in Port Macquarie, he studied First Class Machining and worked at the Toowoomba Foundry in the 1950s. Initially operating in Bob White's backyard, the business faced challenges from the Toowoomba Council regarding its location. In 1965, due to differing visions for the company's future, White and Hagan amicably ended their partnership, splitting their assets and establishing separate businesses.

=== White Industries ===
Post-split, Bob White expanded White Industries, capitalising on the growth of the pig farming and cattle industries. By the late 1960s, the company outgrew its original location and moved to a larger site in Dalby. During the late 1980s and early 1990s, Bob's sons Bruce, Neil, and Craig joined the business.

=== Rocklea Foundry acquisition ===
In 2001, White Industries acquired equipment and clients from the Rocklea Foundry. Subsequently, the company saw growth in the early 2000s, bolstered by the installation of the German-made BMD automated moulding line in the Dalby foundry.

=== Bradken Ipswich acquisition ===
On June 10, 2021, White Industries announced its acquisition of the Bradken Ipswich site, encompassing both the business and its facilities. This move was a strategic response to Bradken's decision to shift its manufacturing operations overseas. Demonstrating a commitment to local industry and employment, White Industries decided to continue operating the foundry at the Karrabin site, hiring back many of Bradken's former employees.

The Ipswich site was particularly significant for White Industries, as it was equipped to produce large castings, a capability beyond the reach of many other foundries in Australia. This capability allowed White Industries to diversify and expand its product range significantly. While the Dalby foundry was focused on producing castings ranging from 1kg to 1 tonne, the newly acquired Ipswich foundry specialised in manufacturing larger parts, ranging from 200kg to 20 tonnes. This expansion not only broadened White Industries' manufacturing capabilities but also enhanced its position in the Australian foundry industry.

== Local impact ==
=== Education ===
In 2019, White Industries was recognised for its support of local education, notably contributing to the Trade Futures program at Dalby State High School. This program involved students building race cars from scratch, offering practical engineering experience. The company's participation is an example of local businesses engaging with educational initiatives in the region.
