= 2002 AFL season =

106th season of the Australian Football League (AFL)

2002 AFL premiership season
- Teams: 16
- Premiers: Brisbane Lions; 2nd premiership
- Minor premiers: Port Adelaide; 1st minor premiership
- Pre-season cup: Port Adelaide; 2nd pre-season cup win
- Brownlow Medallist: Simon Black (Brisbane Lions)
- Leading goalkicker: David Neitz (Melbourne)

Attendance
- Matches played: 185
- Total attendance: 6,092,987 (32,935 per match)
- Highest: 91,817 (Grand Final, Brisbane Lions vs. Collingwood)

The 2002 AFL season was the 106th season of the Australian Football League (AFL), the highest level senior Australian rules football competition in Australia, which was known as the Victorian Football League until 1989. The season featured sixteen clubs, ran from 28 March until 28 September, and comprised a 22-game home-and-away season followed by a finals series featuring the top eight clubs.

The premiership was won by the Brisbane Lions for the second time and second time consecutively, after it defeated Collingwood by nine points in the AFL Grand Final.

== AFL Draft ==
See 2002 AFL draft.

== Wizard Home Loans Cup ==
Port Adelaide defeated Richmond 10.11 (71) to 9.8 (62) in the final.

== Premiership season ==
=== Round 1 ===
	Round 1 (Easter and Season Launch)
Thursday 28 March (7:45 pm)	Richmond 24.11 (155)	def.	Collingwood 18.10 (118)	MCG (crowd: 65,316)
Saturday 30 March (2:10 pm)	St Kilda 14.5 (89)	def.	Carlton 10.5 (65)	Colonial Stadium (crowd: 33,359)
Saturday 30 March (7:10 pm)	Geelong 11.10 (76)	def. by	Essendon 18.18 (126)	MCG (crowd: 42,746)
Saturday 30 March (7:10 pm)	Port Adelaide 11.7 (73)	def. by	Kangaroos 12.11 (83)	Football Park (crowd: 28,578)
Sunday 31 March (1:10 pm)	Sydney 12.15 (87)	def. by	Brisbane Lions 17.8 (110)	SCG (crowd: 24,052)
Sunday 31 March (2:10 pm)	Western Bulldogs 12.21 (93)	def. by	Adelaide 16.16 (112)	Colonial Stadium (crowd: 18,475)
Sunday 31 March (1:40 pm)	West Coast 21.11 (137)	def.	Fremantle 18.10 (118)	Subiaco Oval (crowd: 39,467)
Monday 1 April (2:10 pm)	Hawthorn 15.13 (103)	def. by	Melbourne 20.9 (129)	MCG (crowd: 43,484)

=== Round 2 ===
	Round 2
Friday 5 April (7:45 pm)	Essendon 16.16 (112)	def.	Richmond 8.12 (60)	MCG (crowd: 67,453)
Saturday 6 April (2:10 pm)	Carlton 4.9 (33)	def. by	Sydney 17.9 (111)	Optus Oval (crowd: 22,435)
Saturday 6 April (2:10 pm)	Collingwood 17.18 (120)	def.	West Coast 18.11 (119)	MCG (crowd: 29,348)
Saturday 6 April (7:10 pm)	Kangaroos 16.14 (110)	def.	Western Bulldogs 14.13 (97)	Colonial Stadium (crowd: 25,985)
Saturday 6 April (7:10 pm)	Adelaide 16.14 (110)	def.	Geelong 12.7 (79)	Football Park (crowd: 44,386)
Sunday 7 April (1:10 pm)	Brisbane Lions 21.22 (148)	def.	Hawthorn 6.10 (46)	The Gabba (crowd: 25,660)
Sunday 7 April (2:10 pm)	Melbourne 16.13 (109)	def.	Port Adelaide 11.16 (82)	MCG (crowd: 19,611)
Sunday 7 April (1:40 pm)	Fremantle 10.16 (76)	def.	St Kilda 11.7 (73)	Subiaco Oval (crowd: 21,138)

=== Round 3 ===
	Round 3
Friday 12 April (7:45 pm)	Carlton 11.9 (75)	def.	Collingwood 7.13 (55)	MCG (crowd: 63,864)
Saturday 13 April (2:10 pm)	Richmond 13.18 (96)	def.	Melbourne 11.10 (76)	MCG (crowd: 37,154)
Saturday 13 April (2:10 pm)	Adelaide 17.12 (114)	def.	Sydney 13.6 (84)	Football Park (crowd: 42,246)
Saturday 13 April (7:10 pm)	Brisbane Lions 17.15 (117)	def.	Essendon 9.13 (67)	The Gabba (crowd: 35,898)
Saturday 13 April (7:10 pm)	Kangaroos 10.7 (67)	def. by	Geelong 11.9 (75)	Colonial Stadium (crowd: 27,286)
Sunday 14 April (1:10 pm)	Hawthorn 13.11 (89)	def.	Fremantle 11.13 (79)	York Park (crowd: 15,066)
Sunday 14 April (2:10 pm)	St Kilda 8.8 (56)	def. by	Port Adelaide 20.19 (139)	Colonial Stadium (crowd: 17,641)
Sunday 14 April (1:40 pm)	West Coast 17.11 (113)	def.	Western Bulldogs 11.15 (81)	Subiaco Oval (crowd: 31,854)
Kevin Sheedy coached his 500th AFL game.

=== Round 4 ===
	Round 4
Friday 19 April (7:45 pm)	Essendon 19.8 (122)	def.	Adelaide 11.15 (81)	Colonial Stadium (crowd: 40,322)
Saturday 20 April (2:10 pm)	Collingwood 15.14 (104)	def.	Hawthorn 9.9 (63)	MCG (crowd: 48,476)
Saturday 20 April (2:10 pm)	Melbourne 21.11 (137)	def.	West Coast 15.13 (103)	Optus Oval (crowd: 9,421)
Saturday 20 April (7:10 pm)	Sydney 15.13 (103)	def.	Kangaroos 14.16 (100)	SCG (crowd: 23,775)
Saturday 20 April (7:10 pm)	Western Bulldogs 12.6 (78)	def. by	Brisbane Lions 14.10 (94)	Colonial Stadium (crowd: 23,928)
Sunday 21 April (12:40 pm)	Port Adelaide 23.10 (148)	def.	Carlton 14.11 (95)	Football Park (crowd: 29,486)
Sunday 21 April (2:10 pm)	Geelong 26.10 (166)	def.	St Kilda 6.8 (44)	Skilled Stadium (crowd: 23,563)
Sunday 21 April (1:40 pm)	Fremantle 21.12 (138)	def.	Richmond 11.6 (72)	Subiaco Oval (crowd: 23,571)

=== Round 5 ===
	Round 5 (ANZAC Day)
Thursday 25 April (2:15 pm)	Collingwood 9.12 (66)	def.	Essendon 4.9 (33)	MCG (crowd: 84,894)
Friday 26 April (7:45 pm)	Western Bulldogs 10.21 (81)	def. by	Melbourne 15.14 (104)	Colonial Stadium (crowd: 30,789)
Saturday 27 April (2:10 pm)	Hawthorn 19.11 (125)	def.	Richmond 12.11 (83)	MCG (crowd: 39,694)
Saturday 27 April (1:40 pm)	West Coast 18.13 (121)	def.	Brisbane Lions 10.15 (75)	Subiaco Oval (crowd: 33,313)
Saturday 27 April (7:10 pm)	St Kilda 8.8 (56)	drew with	Sydney 8.8 (56)	Colonial Stadium (crowd: 21,007)
Saturday 27 April (7:10 pm)	Adelaide 12.10 (82)	def. by	Port Adelaide 14.6 (90)	Football Park (crowd: 49,513)
Sunday 28 April (1:10 pm)	Geelong 17.9 (111)	def.	Fremantle 6.13 (49)	Skilled Stadium (crowd: 20,075)
Sunday 28 April (2:10 pm)	Carlton 17.10 (112)	def. by	Kangaroos 19.17 (131)	Colonial Stadium (crowd: 35,138)
Brisbane lost its first match since round 9, 2001, ending a 20-match winning streak. The streak equalled with Essendon's in 2000 and Collingwood's in 1928-29 as the second-longest winning streak in VFL/AFL history.

=== Round 6 ===
Home team	Score	Away team	Score	Venue	Attendance	Date
St Kilda	3.10 (28)	Collingwood	16.15 (111)	Colonial Stadium	46,089	Friday, 3 May
Kangaroos	13.9 (87)	Hawthorn	24.11 (155)	MCG	33,345	Saturday, 4 May
Fremantle	13.11 (89)	Essendon	9.8 (62)	Subiaco Oval	25,319	Saturday, 4 May
Carlton	9.14 (68)	Western Bulldogs	14.12 (96)	Colonial Stadium	29,783	Saturday, 4 May
Brisbane Lions	21.20 (146)	Geelong	13.11 (89)	The Gabba	27,015	Saturday, 4 May
Sydney	15.9 (99)	Melbourne	10.11 (71)	SCG	23,578	Sunday, 5 May
Richmond	11.7 (73)	Adelaide	14.21 (105)	Colonial Stadium	23,355	Sunday, 5 May
Port Adelaide	20.13 (133)	West Coast	11.13 (79)	Football Park	27,056	Sunday, 5 May

=== Round 7 ===
Home team	Score	Away team	Score	Venue	Attendance	Date
Essendon	12.15 (87)	Carlton	9.8 (62)	MCG	55,633	Friday, 10 May
Hawthorn	20.10 (130)	Geelong	11.12 (78)	MCG	38,709	Saturday, 11 May
West Coast	21.13 (139)	Kangaroos	13.12 (90)	Subiaco Oval	32,815	Saturday, 11 May
Richmond	13.10 (88)	Sydney	12.10 (82)	Colonial Stadium	29,303	Saturday, 11 May
Adelaide	18.10 (118)	Fremantle	13.11 (89)	Football Park	44,058	Saturday, 11 May
Brisbane Lions	19.15 (129)	Port Adelaide	11.6 (72)	The Gabba	24,538	Sunday, 12 May
Melbourne	15.15 (105)	St Kilda	15.12 (102)	MCG	20,892	Sunday, 12 May
Western Bulldogs	8.15 (63)	Collingwood	11.7 (73)	Colonial Stadium	34,400	Sunday, 12 May

=== Round 8 ===
Home team	Score	Away team	Score	Venue	Attendance	Date
Hawthorn	12.17 (89)	Carlton	12.8 (80)	MCG	39,142	Friday, 17 May
Richmond	13.16 (94)	West Coast	10.13 (73)	MCG	22,647	Saturday, 18 May
Port Adelaide	20.9 (129)	Geelong	7.12 (54)	Football Park	18,193	Saturday, 18 May
Collingwood	17.12 (114)	Brisbane Lions	16.15 (111)	Colonial Stadium	46,279	Saturday, 18 May
Fremantle	14.10 (94)	Melbourne	13.11 (89)	Subiaco Oval	25,027	Saturday, 18 May
Kangaroos	16.14 (110)	Adelaide	14.9 (93)	Manuka Oval	7,671	Sunday, 19 May
Western Bulldogs	24.15 (159)	Sydney	11.24 (90)	SCG	20,934	Sunday, 19 May
Essendon	26.15 (171)	St Kilda	11.6 (72)	Colonial Stadium	34,262	Sunday, 19 May

=== Round 9 ===
Home team	Score	Away team	Score	Venue	Attendance	Date
Port Adelaide	14.7 (91)	Collingwood	12.14 (86)	Football Park	35,834	Friday, 24 May
Geelong	17.3 (105)	Western Bulldogs	18.9 (117)	Skilled Stadium	22,033	Saturday, 25 May
Melbourne	17.9 (111)	Kangaroos	15.17 (107)	MCG	28,625	Saturday, 25 May
St Kilda	10.12 (72)	Richmond	9.9 (63)	Colonial Stadium	30,336	Saturday, 25 May
Sydney	11.17 (83)	Essendon	12.13 (85)	Stadium Australia	54,129	Saturday, 25 May
Brisbane Lions	16.13 (109)	Fremantle	11.13 (79)	The Gabba	21,709	Sunday, 26 May
Carlton	11.9 (75)	Adelaide	20.11 (131)	Optus Oval	19,305	Sunday, 26 May
West Coast	19.12 (126)	Hawthorn	14.4 (88)	Subiaco Oval	38,646	Sunday, 26 May

=== Round 10 ===
Home team	Score	Away team	Score	Venue	Attendance	Date
Kangaroos	12.20 (92)	Essendon	12.12 (84)	MCG	34,352	Friday, 31 May
Geelong	12.17 (89)	Melbourne	9.9 (63)	Skilled Stadium	20,031	Saturday, 1 June
Richmond	14.14 (98)	Western Bulldogs	17.15 (117)	MCG	31,586	Saturday, 1 June
Collingwood	14.11 (95)	Sydney	12.12 (84)	Colonial Stadium	45,269	Saturday, 1 June
Adelaide	15.11 (101)	Brisbane Lions	14.10 (94)	Football Park	47,279	Saturday, 1 June
Hawthorn	12.5 (77)	Port Adelaide	17.15 (117)	York Park	18,112	Sunday, 2 June
St Kilda	20.7 (127)	West Coast	11.11 (77)	Colonial Stadium	18,876	Sunday, 2 June
Fremantle	14.12 (96)	Carlton	10.8 (68)	Subiaco Oval	27,277	Sunday, 2 June

=== Round 11 ===
Home team	Score	Away team	Score	Venue	Attendance	Date
Kangaroos	14.11 (95)	Richmond	11.18 (84)	Colonial Stadium	30,889	Friday, 7 June
Adelaide	14.18 (102)	Hawthorn	8.10 (58)	Football Park	42,162	Saturday, 8 June
Essendon	7.7 (49)	Port Adelaide	16.12 (108)	Colonial Stadium	40,044	Saturday, 8 June
West Coast	15.12 (102)	Sydney	13.11 (89)	Subiaco Oval	35,014	Saturday, 8 June
Brisbane Lions	16.17 (113)	St Kilda	7.10 (52)	The Gabba	23,157	Sunday, 9 June
Geelong	15.10 (100)	Carlton	14.12 (96)	Colonial Stadium	37,294	Sunday, 9 June
Western Bulldogs	22.13 (145)	Fremantle	12.8 (80)	Optus Oval	11,539	Sunday, 9 June
Melbourne	10.15 (75)	Collingwood	19.12 (126)	MCG	65,860	Monday, 10 June

=== Round 12 ===
Home team	Score	Away team	Score	Venue	Attendance	Date
Essendon	10.12 (72)	Hawthorn	10.5 (65)	MCG	40,470	Friday, 14 June
Carlton	12.16 (88)	West Coast	12.17 (89)	Optus Oval	16,353	Saturday, 15 June
Sydney	15.9 (99)	Geelong	15.11 (101)	SCG	21,767	Saturday, 15 June
Fremantle	12.18 (90)	Collingwood	12.7 (79)	Subiaco Oval	33,088	Sunday, 16 June
Western Bulldogs	19.19 (133)	St Kilda	13.8 (86)	Colonial Stadium	29,453	Friday, 21 June
Melbourne	14.14 (98)	Adelaide	10.13 (73)	Optus Oval	12,210	Saturday, 22 June
Brisbane Lions	20.18 (138)	Kangaroos	19.9 (123)	The Gabba	27,940	Saturday, 22 June
Port Adelaide	23.16 (154)	Richmond	10.10 (70)	Football Park	25,770	Sunday, 23 June

=== Round 13 ===
Home team	Score	Away team	Score	Venue	Attendance	Date
Essendon	18.12 (120)	Melbourne	16.12 (108)	Colonial Stadium	41,817	Friday, 28 June
Richmond	7.12 (54)	Geelong	14.12 (96)	MCG	30,197	Saturday, 29 June
Port Adelaide	25.11 (161)	Western Bulldogs	18.7 (115)	Football Park	24,751	Saturday, 29 June
Collingwood	13.15 (93)	Kangaroos	8.12 (60)	Colonial Stadium	48,288	Saturday, 29 June
Brisbane Lions	19.10 (124)	Carlton	16.13 (109)	The Gabba	27,324	Saturday, 29 June
Sydney	20.19 (139)	Fremantle	9.8 (62)	SCG	16,844	Sunday, 30 June
St Kilda	11.12 (78)	Hawthorn	13.9 (87)	Colonial Stadium	28,928	Sunday, 30 June
West Coast	20.15 (135)	Adelaide	18.9 (117)	Subiaco Oval	34,937	Sunday, 30 June

=== Round 14 ===
Home team	Score	Away team	Score	Venue	Attendance	Date
Carlton	13.8 (86)	Richmond	12.13 (85)	MCG	36,941	Friday, 5 July
Geelong	8.17 (65)	West Coast	4.9 (33)	Skilled Stadium	18,608	Saturday, 6 July
Hawthorn	11.8 (74)	Sydney	9.10 (64)	MCG	25,079	Saturday, 6 July
Western Bulldogs	18.10 (118)	Essendon	17.16 (118)	Colonial Stadium	44,864	Saturday, 6 July
Fremantle	9.9 (63)	Port Adelaide	22.15 (147)	Subiaco Oval	24,193	Saturday, 6 July
Melbourne	20.11 (131)	Brisbane Lions	16.14 (110)	The Gabba	25,166	Sunday, 7 July
St Kilda	13.6 (84)	Kangaroos	20.8 (128)	Colonial Stadium	23,864	Sunday, 7 July
Adelaide	17.14 (116)	Collingwood	21.12 (138)	Football Park	46,368	Sunday, 7 July

=== Round 15 ===
Home team	Score	Away team	Score	Venue	Attendance	Date
Hawthorn	17.14 (116)	Western Bulldogs	14.9 (93)	Colonial Stadium	35,434	Friday, 12 July
Kangaroos	12.11 (83)	Fremantle	12.10 (82)	Manuka Oval	9,242	Saturday, 13 July
Collingwood	15.9 (99)	Geelong	19.13 (127)	MCG	65,331	Saturday, 13 July
Richmond	7.13 (55)	Brisbane Lions	18.10 (118)	Colonial Stadium	22,642	Saturday, 13 July
Adelaide	15.9 (99)	St Kilda	12.9 (81)	AAMI Stadium	29,895	Saturday, 13 July
Sydney	13.14 (92)	Port Adelaide	14.10 (94)	SCG	18,974	Sunday, 14 July
Carlton	14.11 (95)	Melbourne	21.13 (139)	Colonial Stadium	37,915	Sunday, 14 July
West Coast	13.12 (90)	Essendon	8.15 (63)	Subiaco Oval	37,600	Sunday, 14 July

=== Round 16 ===
Home team	Score	Away team	Score	Venue	Attendance	Date
Collingwood	13.11 (89)	Richmond	7.7 (49)	MCG	48,620	Friday, 19 July
Melbourne	9.13 (67)	Hawthorn	14.9 (93)	MCG	37,442	Saturday, 20 July
Kangaroos	14.15 (99)	Port Adelaide	10.10 (70)	Optus Oval	9,398	Saturday, 20 July
Essendon	8.8 (56)	Geelong	14.11 (95)	Colonial Stadium	47,778	Saturday, 20 July
Fremantle	15.10 (100)	West Coast	11.4 (70)	Subiaco Oval	41,779	Saturday, 20 July
Brisbane Lions	17.15 (117)	Sydney	12.7 (79)	The Gabba	25,720	Sunday, 21 July
Carlton	14.13 (97)	St Kilda	22.8 (140)	Colonial Stadium	33,813	Sunday, 21 July
Adelaide	21.12 (138)	Western Bulldogs	14.11 (95)	AAMI Stadium	41,247	Sunday, 21 July

=== Round 17 ===
Home team	Score	Away team	Score	Venue	Attendance	Date
Richmond	7.11 (53)	Essendon	7.12 (54)	MCG	39,650	Friday, 26 July
Hawthorn	10.8 (68)	Brisbane Lions	18.16 (124)	MCG	35,202	Saturday, 27 July
West Coast	17.12 (114)	Collingwood	8.8 (56)	Subiaco Oval	38,877	Saturday, 27 July
Sydney	13.14 (92)	Carlton	10.9 (69)	Telstra Stadium	34,404	Saturday, 27 July
Port Adelaide	17.14 (116)	Melbourne	17.10 (112)	AAMI Stadium	25,283	Saturday, 27 July
Geelong	12.18 (90)	Adelaide	15.3 (93)	Skilled Stadium	24,325	Sunday, 28 July
St Kilda	18.10 (118)	Fremantle	11.13 (79)	Optus Oval	8,078	Sunday, 28 July
Western Bulldogs	21.13 (139)	Kangaroos	16.9 (105)	Colonial Stadium	31,576	Sunday, 28 July

=== Round 18 ===
Home team	Score	Away team	Score	Venue	Attendance	Date
Collingwood	21.15 (141)	Carlton	4.9 (33)	MCG	54,233	Friday, 2 August
Geelong	7.9 (51)	Kangaroos	17.13 (115)	Skilled Stadium	23,163	Saturday, 3 August
Fremantle	14.12 (96)	Hawthorn	4.11 (35)	Subiaco Oval	24,332	Saturday, 3 August
Essendon	11.5 (71)	Brisbane Lions	16.12 (108)	Colonial Stadium	43,036	Saturday, 3 August
Port Adelaide	16.9 (105)	St Kilda	9.9 (63)	AAMI Stadium	22,885	Saturday, 3 August
Sydney	15.8 (98)	Adelaide	17.14 (116)	SCG	18,766	Sunday, 4 August
Melbourne	14.10 (94)	Richmond	14.15 (99)	MCG	28,815	Sunday, 4 August
Western Bulldogs	22.10 (142)	West Coast	14.7 (91)	Optus Oval	11,809	Sunday, 4 August

=== Round 19 ===
Home team	Score	Away team	Score	Venue	Attendance	Date
Hawthorn	15.15 (105)	Collingwood	14.13 (97)	MCG	53,750	Friday, 9 August
Carlton	5.15 (45)	Port Adelaide	7.12 (54)	Optus Oval	14,115	Saturday, 10 August
Richmond	18.14 (122)	Fremantle	10.12 (72)	MCG	19,519	Saturday, 10 August
Brisbane Lions	14.21 (105)	Western Bulldogs	9.13 (67)	The Gabba	27,443	Saturday, 10 August
Kangaroos	15.7 (97)	Sydney	22.12 (144)	SCG	14,776	Saturday, 10 August
Adelaide	18.16 (124)	Essendon	11.10 (76)	AAMI Stadium	43,720	Sunday, 11 August
St Kilda	15.11 (101)	Geelong	16.6 (102)	Colonial Stadium	25,552	Sunday, 11 August
West Coast	15.10 (100)	Melbourne	15.16 (106)	Subiaco Oval	36,195	Sunday, 11 August

=== Round 20 ===
Home team	Score	Away team	Score	Venue	Attendance	Date
Richmond	16.11 (107)	Hawthorn	13.15 (93)	MCG	39,391	Friday, 16 August
Kangaroos	17.12 (114)	Carlton	15.5 (95)	Colonial Stadium	23,532	Saturday, 17 August
Fremantle	17.15 (117)	Geelong	11.6 (72)	Subiaco Oval	22,610	Saturday, 17 August
Essendon	19.12 (126)	Collingwood	10.11 (71)	MCG	69,613	Saturday, 17 August
Brisbane Lions	20.16 (136)	West Coast	13.11 (89)	The Gabba	29,436	Saturday, 17 August
Sydney	12.15 (87)	St Kilda	12.8 (80)	SCG	16,079	Sunday, 18 August
Melbourne	15.17 (107)	Western Bulldogs	14.11 (95)	MCG	29,225	Sunday, 18 August
Port Adelaide	12.12 (84)	Adelaide	11.10 (76)	AAMI Stadium	50,275	Sunday, 18 August

=== Round 21 ===
Home team	Score	Away team	Score	Venue	Attendance	Date
Hawthorn	16.8 (104)	Kangaroos	17.17 (119)	MCG	32,393	Friday, 23 August
Geelong	7.13 (55)	Brisbane Lions	16.14 (110)	Skilled Stadium	24,003	Saturday, 24 August
Melbourne	11.11 (77)	Sydney	23.7 (145)	MCG	27,146	Saturday, 24 August
Western Bulldogs	14.13 (97)	Carlton	15.9 (99)	Colonial Stadium	22,938	Saturday, 24 August
West Coast	10.5 (65)	Port Adelaide	14.19 (103)	Subiaco Oval	36,502	Saturday, 24 August
Adelaide	13.9 (87)	Richmond	9.11 (65)	AAMI Stadium	42,878	Sunday, 25 August
Collingwood	11.11 (77)	St Kilda	9.12 (66)	MCG	42,056	Sunday, 25 August
Essendon	13.15 (93)	Fremantle	10.12 (72)	Colonial Stadium	32,667	Sunday, 25 August

=== Round 22 ===
Home team	Score	Away team	Score	Venue	Attendance	Date
Geelong	8.9 (57)	Hawthorn	11.9 (75)	Colonial Stadium	41,600	Friday, 30 August
Collingwood	10.13 (73)	Western Bulldogs	17.12 (114)	MCG	43,894	Saturday, 31 August
Port Adelaide	13.12 (90)	Brisbane Lions	13.6 (84)	AAMI Stadium	46,439	Saturday, 31 August
St Kilda	18.9 (117)	Melbourne	20.15 (135)	Colonial Stadium	34,185	Saturday, 31 August
Sydney	17.14 (116)	Richmond	11.10 (76)	Telstra Stadium	40,386	Saturday, 31 August
Kangaroos	18.18 (126)	West Coast	22.11 (143)	Manuka Oval	11,613	Sunday, 1 September
Carlton	5.7 (37)	Essendon	12.20 (92)	MCG	46,649	Sunday, 1 September
Fremantle	12.8 (80)	Adelaide	17.18 (120)	Subiaco Oval	21,610	Sunday, 1 September

== Ladder ==
All teams played 22 games during the home and away season, for a total of 176. An additional 9 games were played during the finals series.

2002 AFL ladder
Pos	Team	Pld	W	L	D	PF	PA	PP	Pts	
1	Port Adelaide	22	18	4	0	2360	1783	132.4	72	Finals series
2	Brisbane Lions (P)	22	17	5	0	2520	1843	136.7	68	Finals series
3	Adelaide	22	15	7	0	2308	2007	115.0	60	Finals series
4	Collingwood	22	13	9	0	2081	1897	109.7	52	Finals series
5	Essendon	22	12	9	1	1939	1847	105.0	50	Finals series
6	Melbourne	22	12	10	0	2243	2245	99.9	48	Finals series
7	Kangaroos	22	12	10	0	2241	2269	98.8	48	Finals series
8	West Coast	22	11	11	0	2208	2254	98.0	44	Finals series
9	Geelong	22	11	11	0	1933	2029	95.3	44	
10	Hawthorn	22	11	11	0	1938	2107	92.0	44	
11	Sydney	22	9	12	1	2123	1976	107.4	38	
12	Western Bulldogs	22	9	12	1	2335	2246	104.0	38	
13	Fremantle	22	9	13	0	1900	2151	88.3	36	
14	Richmond	22	7	15	0	1801	2172	82.9	28	
15	St Kilda	22	5	16	1	1785	2271	78.6	22	
16	Carlton	22	3	19	0	1682	2300	73.1	12	

Source: AFL ladder
Rules for classification: 1) points; 2) percentage; 3) number of points for.
(P) Premiers

=== Ladder progression ===
Numbers highlighted in green indicate that the team finished the round inside the top 8.
Numbers highlighted in blue indicates the team finished first on the ladder in that round.
Numbers highlighted in red indicates the team finished in last place on the ladder in that round.

Team ╲ Round	1	2	3	4	5	6	7	8	9	10	11	12	13	14	15	16	17	18	19	20	21	22
Port Adelaide	0	0	4	8	12	16	16	20	24	28	32	36	40	44	48	48	52	56	60	64	68	72
Brisbane Lions	4	8	12	16	16	20	24	24	28	28	32	36	40	40	44	48	52	56	60	64	68	68
Adelaide	4	8	12	12	12	16	20	20	24	28	32	32	32	32	36	40	44	48	52	52	56	60
Collingwood	0	4	4	8	12	16	20	24	24	28	32	32	36	40	40	44	44	48	48	48	52	52
Essendon	4	8	8	12	12	12	16	20	24	24	24	28	32	34	34	34	38	38	38	42	46	50
Melbourne	4	8	8	12	16	16	20	20	24	24	24	28	28	32	36	36	36	36	40	44	44	48
Kangaroos	4	8	8	8	12	12	12	16	16	20	24	24	24	28	32	36	36	40	40	44	48	48
West Coast	4	4	8	8	12	12	16	16	20	20	24	28	32	32	36	36	40	40	40	40	40	44
Geelong	0	0	4	8	12	12	12	12	12	16	20	24	28	32	36	40	40	40	44	44	44	44
Hawthorn	0	0	4	4	8	12	16	20	20	20	20	20	24	28	32	36	36	36	40	40	40	44
Sydney	0	4	4	8	10	14	14	14	14	14	14	14	18	18	18	18	22	22	26	30	34	38
Western Bulldogs	0	0	0	0	0	4	4	8	12	16	20	24	24	26	26	26	30	34	34	34	34	38
Fremantle	0	4	4	8	8	12	12	16	16	20	20	24	24	24	24	28	28	32	32	36	36	36
Richmond	4	4	8	8	8	8	12	16	16	16	16	16	16	16	16	16	16	20	24	28	28	28
St Kilda	4	4	4	4	6	6	6	6	10	14	14	14	14	14	14	18	22	22	22	22	22	22
Carlton	0	0	4	4	4	4	4	4	4	4	4	4	4	8	8	8	8	8	8	8	12	12

== Finals series ==
Qualifying and elimination finals
6 Sep, AAMI Stadium
1	Port Adelaide	14.11 (95)
4	Collingwood	16.12 (108)
7 Sep, Colonial Stadium
5	Essendon	17.9 (111)
8	West Coast	11.12 (78)
8 Sep, MCG
6	Melbourne	18.14 (122)
7	Kangaroos	11.18 (84)
7 Sep, The Gabba
2	Brisbane Lions	17.13 (115)
3	Adelaide	5.14 (44)

Semi-finals
13 Sep, AAMI Stadium
Port Adelaide	11.17 (83)
Essendon	8.11 (59)
14 Sep, MCG
Adelaide	20.10 (130)
Melbourne	17.16 (118)

Preliminary finals
21 Sep, MCG
Collingwood	13.13 (91)
Adelaide	9.9 (63)
21 Sep, The Gabba
Brisbane Lions	21.12 (138)
Port Adelaide	12.10 (82)

Grand final
28 Sep, MCG
Collingwood	9.12 (66)
Brisbane Lions	10.15 (75)

=== Week one ===
Home team	Score	Away team	Score	Venue	Attendance	Date
Port Adelaide	14.11 (95)	Collingwood	16.12 (108)	AAMI Stadium	33,131	Friday, 6 September
Essendon	17.9 (111)	West Coast	11.12 (78)	Colonial Stadium	37,475	Saturday, 7 September
Brisbane Lions	17.13 (115)	Adelaide	5.14 (44)	The Gabba	31,854	Saturday, 7 September
Melbourne	18.14 (122)	Kangaroos	11.18 (84)	MCG	53,967	Sunday, 8 September

=== Week two ===
Home Team	Score	Away team	Score	Venue	Attendance	Date
Port Adelaide	11.17 (83)	Essendon	8.11 (59)	AAMI Stadium	27,661	Friday, 13 September
Adelaide	20.10 (130)	Melbourne	17.16 (118)	MCG	51,533	Saturday, 14 September

Note: Adelaide played its "home" final at the MCG despite being ranked above Melbourne due to the agreement then in place with the Melbourne Cricket Club that at least one game each week of the finals be played at the MCG.

=== Week three ===
Home team	Score	Away team	Score	Venue	Attendance	Date
Collingwood	13.13 (91)	Adelaide	9.9 (63)	MCG	88,960	Saturday, 21 September
Brisbane Lions	21.12 (138)	Port Adelaide	12.10 (82)	The Gabba	33,047	Saturday, 21 September

=== Week four ===
Home team	Score	Away team	Score	Venue	Attendance	Date
Collingwood	9.12 (66)	Brisbane Lions	10.15 (75)	MCG	91,817	Saturday, 28 September

== Match attendance ==
Total match attendance for all games was 5,643,908 people. Attendance at the Grand Final was 91,817 people. The largest non-finals attendance was 84,894 people for the Collingwood v Essendon game in round 5.

== Awards ==
- The Brownlow Medal was awarded to Simon Black of the Brisbane Lions.
- The Leigh Matthews Trophy was awarded to Luke Darcy of the Western Bulldogs and Michael Voss of the Brisbane Lions.
  - This was the first year for this award under this name. Previously, it was the AFL Players Association MVP Award.
- The Coleman Medal was awarded to David Neitz of Melbourne.
- The Norm Smith Medal was awarded to Nathan Buckley of Collingwood.
- The AFL Rising Star award was awarded to Nick Riewoldt of St Kilda.

== Notable events ==
- For the first time since 1965, no player kicked ten goals or more in a match.
- Collingwood appeared in the finals for the first time since 1994, breaking an eight year drought, the longest in club history. They won their first final in twelve years since their last premiership in 1990, also the longest drought of finals wins in club history.
- Carlton won the wooden spoon for the first time. Carlton was the last of the twelve traditional Victorian clubs to win the wooden spoon in the VFL/AFL.
- Carlton played only four home games at Optus Oval, after arranging a deal to play four home games at Colonial Stadium. In order for the AFL to meet its contractual obligation to stage nine games per year at Optus Oval, six neutral games between a low-drawing Victorian team and an interstate team were staged at the venue. The unpopular venture was not repeated, as all of the home teams in these neutral games lost money due to poor crowds and, in many cases, conflicting sponsorship deals.
- Even though Adelaide was entitled to a home semi-final after losing its qualifying final to Brisbane, the game was played at the Melbourne Cricket Ground due to the agreement which required at least one game to be played at the ground during each week of the finals.
- At the end of the season, the Carlton Football Club was found to have systematically breached the salary cap in 2000 and 2001. The club was fined and stripped of draft picks in the following two drafts, hampering their on-field results and long-term playing list rebuild in subsequent seasons.
- Sydney coach Rodney Eade resigned following round 12, after the Swans slumped to 14th on the ladder. He was eventually replaced by Paul Roos on a full-time basis, despite the board pushing for Terry Wallace, who resigned as coach of the Western Bulldogs with one round to play in the regular season, to be appointed. Roos would later coach the side to the premiership in 2005 before stepping down at the end of the 2010 season.
