= Ron Castan =

Australian activist and lawyer (1939-1999)

Aaron Ronald Castan AM QC (29 October 1939 – 21 October 1999) was an Australian barrister and human rights advocate.

== Legal career ==
Castan played a leading role in some of Australia's more important cases, such as Koowarta v Bjelke-Petersen and the Franklin Dam case. One of his most celebrated roles was that of senior counsel in the Mabo case, which overruled the application of the enlarged doctrine of terra nullius in Australia, to recognize Aboriginal land rights in Australian common law for the first time. Castan spent 10 years preparing and arguing the case on behalf of Eddie Mabo, for which he received widespread acclaim.

In 1985 Castan, along with Uncle Jim Berg, and Ron Merkel, sued the University of Melbourne and the Museum of Victoria for the return of their collections of Indigenous cultural material and through this act created the Koorie Heritage Trust.

He also played a leading role in the legislative discussions on Australian native title law throughout the 1990s, having devised the solution to the standoff in the Australian Senate over the Wik settlement. Additionally, he was a founder of the Victorian Aboriginal Legal Service.

Although he is most famous for his work in constitutional and human rights law, Castan was an expert in many areas of law. The Castan Centre for Human Rights Law at Monash University is named after him, where his daughter, Melissa Castan (herself a human rights scholar), is the centre's director.

Castan also committed himself to human rights. For several years he worked as a Human Rights and Equal Opportunity Commissioner in Victoria.

== Personal life ==
Castan was a member of the Smorgon family and a child of Russian Jewish immigrants who migrated to Australia. He was considered a Jewish community leader.

Castan died suddenly at age 59 due to a complication following surgery. After his death, tributes flowed from the legal and political community, and he was described by Senator Aden Ridgeway as "the great white warrior against racism".

== See also ==
- Mabo v Queensland (1988)
- Eddie Mabo
