= Koorie Heritage Trust =

Indigenous cultural organisation in Melbourne, Australia

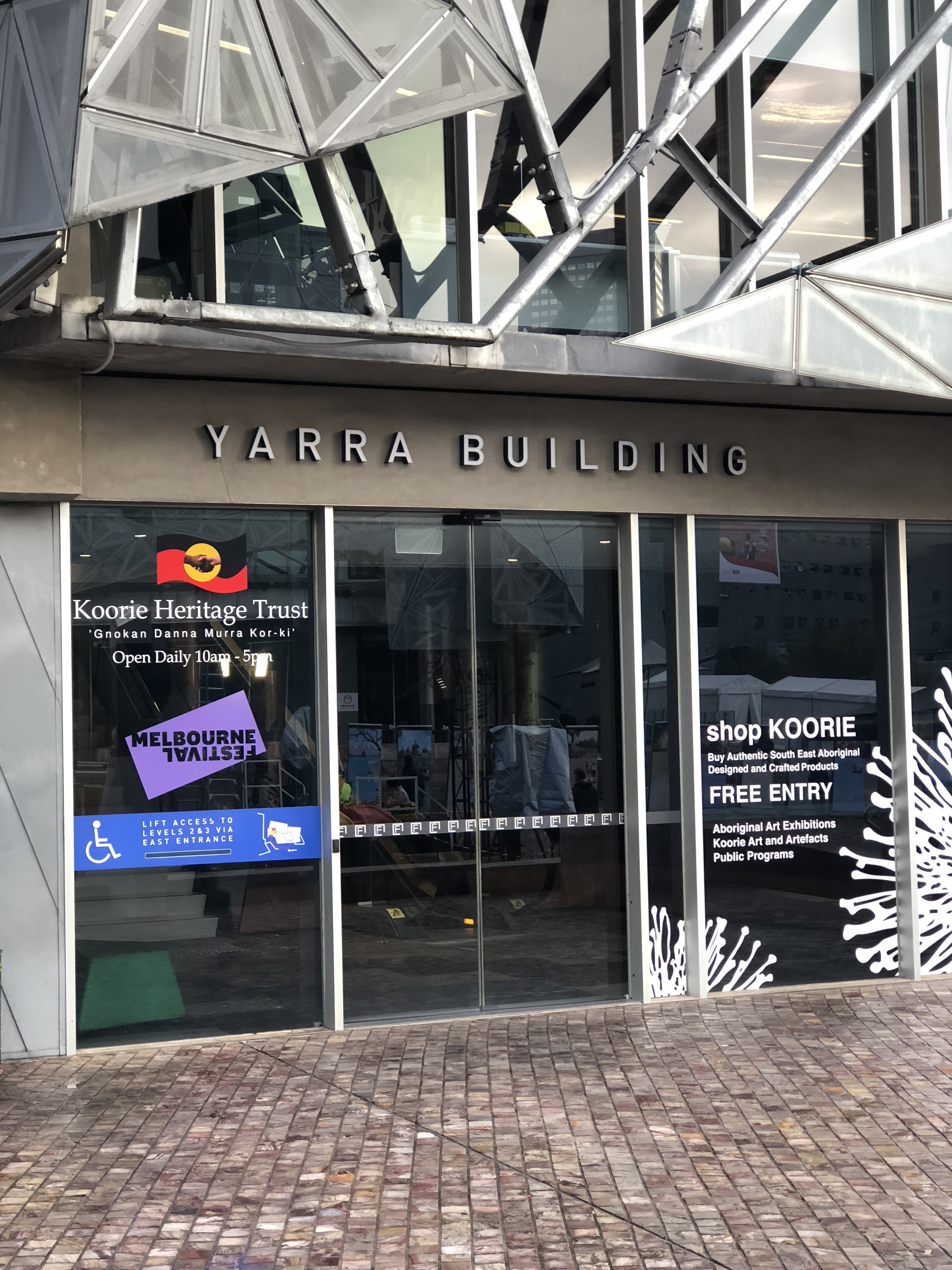
- Established: 1985
- Location: Federation Square Melbourne Australia
- Coordinates: 37.8183°S 144.9691°E
- Website: https://koorieheritagetrust.com.au/

The Koorie Heritage Trust is an Indigenous not-for-profit cultural organisation based in Melbourne. It holds over 100,000 items in its collection from paintings and artefacts through to books, videos and photographs. It has "...a commitment to protect, preserve and promote the living culture of the Indigenous people of south-east Australia." The Koorie Heritage Trust also runs a variety of cultural educational programs and a Koorie family history service.

== History ==
The Koorie Heritage Trust was established in 1985 when Uncle Jim Berg, Ron Castan, and Ron Merkel sued the University of Melbourne and the Museum of Victoria for the return of their collections of Indigenous cultural material. They wanted to ensure that the Indigenous community had access to their cultural heritage material.

== Location ==
The Koorie Heritage Trust is located in the Yarra Building in Federation Square, Melbourne, Australia.

In 2017, the management of Federation Square applied to demolish the Yarra Building, with the trust to be re-located elsewhere in the precinct, to build a proposed Apple Store on the site. The National Trust applied for Federation Square to be added to the Victorian Heritage Register, and in April 2019 Heritage Victoria refused the demolition application.
