= David Smorgon =

Australian businessman

David Smorgon is an Australian businessman and member of the Smorgon family.

== Business career ==
David joined the family business at the age of 23. David advanced to be a senior executive at Smorgon Consolidated Industries, which is the large family business that spanned meat, paper, glass, plastics and steel industries. David then spent 25 years as an executive and director with Smorgon Consolidated Industries.

After the sale of Smorgon Consolidated Industries in 1996, David, along with his three children; Dean (b. 1969–70), Ricky (b. 1971–72), and Dale (b. 1974–75), also built up their self-run stockholding organisation, Generation Investment Management focusing on business opportunities, equity and property investments. This corporation is known for providing loan-to-own transactions to assist global corporations with debt, with such clients as Bonds, and coin-operated entertainment business Ride On! Entertainment; the latter in which Ricky and Dale are executive directors.

David was also named the inaugural chairman of Family Business Australia in 1997, a position he held for six years.

In 2013, David accepted the role of Patron for SportsConnect, an organisation connecting business and sport.

In June 2014, David became Executive Chairman of PricewaterhouseCoopers of the Australian branch.

In January 2019, David founded his own company Pointmade and also became the CEO of the company, where he has continued his Family Advisory work under.

== Sports Administration career ==
=== Western Bulldogs Football Club President ===
He is most noted for holding the presidency of the Western Bulldogs, an Australian rules football club in the Australian Football League (AFL). He has held the position of president from 1996 to 2012. David stepped down as President in December 2012, ending a 16 year reign.

== Order of Australia ==
For his contributions to the community through health, social welfare and education, he was awarded the Medal of the Order of Australia in 2000.

== Personal life ==
Smorgon's wife Roslyn died from cancer on Sunday 27 January 2008 aged 58. As a member of the Smorgon family, his cousin is Graham Smorgon, former Smorgon Steel chairman and former president of the Carlton Football Club.

David was educated at Brighton Grammar. He studied law at Monash University.

Sporting positions
Preceded by Peter Gordon	Western Bulldogs president 1996—2012	Succeeded by Peter Gordon
