= Graham Smorgon =

Australian businessman

Graham Smorgon AM is a prominent Australian businessman and a member of the Smorgon family – one of Australia's wealthiest and most powerful and influential families.

== Business career ==
He was appointed as Chairman of Smorgon Consolidated in 1994, and was the chairman of the Smorgon Steel Group in 2006 when it was split and sold to OneSteel and BlueScope. Smorgon then went on to become Chairman of the GBM Group, Smorgon Consolidated Investment and Scental Pacific. Smorgon is also a director of Incitec Pivot Limited. Smorgon's other roles and positions included Director of Federation Square, Deputy Chairman of Melbourne Health, Director of The Walter and Eliza Hall Institute of Medical Research and Trustee of the Victorian Arts Centre Trust.

== Sports Administration career ==
=== Carlton Football Club ===
In 2002, Smorgon joined the Board of directors at the Carlton Football Club. In April 2006, Smorgon took over the Presidency of the Carlton Football Club after Ian Collins stood down. He held this position until he failed to win a board position in the February 2007 club election that elected Richard Pratt as President of the Carlton Football Club. Smorgon's tenure as President of the club was unstable because Carlton struggled to maintain off-field stability with club debt, as well as continuous poor on-field results. Also in Smorgon's tenure as president of Carlton, In September 2006, Smorgon was involved in a board of the club coup plot to push for the removal of senior coach Denis Pagan, Smorgon then reversed this position and declared his full board support for senior coach Pagan and extended Pagan's contract as senior coach until the 2008 season.

== Order of Australia ==
Smorgon was made a Member of the Order of Australia (AM) in the 2013 Australia Day Honours.

== Personal life ==
As a member of the Smorgon family, He is also the grandson of Moses Smorgon, who emigrated from the Russian empire in the 1920s with his brother Naum; Naum's son Victor Smorgon co-founded Smorgon Consolidated Industries. He is also the cousin of David Smorgon, the former executive and director of Smorgon Consolidated Industries and the former President of Western Bulldogs Football Club. .

Preceded by Ian Collins	Carlton Football Club president 2006–2007	Succeeded by Richard Pratt
