= Smorgon Steel =

Australian steel manufacturing business

- Industry: Steelmaking
- Founded: 1958
- Founder: Victor Smorgon
- Defunct: 2007
- Successor: OneSteel
- Headquarters: Port Melbourne, Australia
- Key people: Graham Smorgon (Chairman)
- Products: Steel products, reinforcing steel, structural steel
- Revenue: $3.2 billion (2006)
- Operating income: $782 million (2006)
- Net income: $264 million (2006)
- Number of employees: 5,800 (2006)
- Website: www.smorgonsteel.com.au

Smorgon Steel was an Australian steel manufacturing company. It was the last remaining part of Smorgon Consolidated Industries, founded in 1958 by Victor Smorgon, member of the Smorgon family.

In 1997, Smorgon purchased structural materials Welded Mesh from Leighton Holdings. In December 1998, Smorgon Steel took over Australian National Industries. It was floated on the Australian Securities Exchange in February 1999.

In December 2001, Bradken was sold to Castle Harlan Australian Mezzanine Partners. In 2007 Smorgon Steel merged with OneSteel, with its distribution operations sold to BlueScope.
