= Loti Smorgon =

Australian philanthropist

Loti Smorgon AO (née Kiffer; 1919 – 20 August 2013) was an Australian philanthropist. Along with her husband, Victor Smorgon, she donated an estimated $40 million in cash and artwork to the National Gallery of Victoria.

Loti married Victor in 1937, and they were married for 73 years until his death in 2009. They were both made Officers of the Order of Australia in the 1990 Queen's Birthday Honours (Victor was later elevated to Companion) and were both featured on the Australian Legends series of postage stamps in 2008.

She was also the subject of a 1981 portrait by Andy Warhol. Titled Loti Smorgon, it is in the National Gallery of Victoria.
