= Machine guidance =

The term Machine Guidance is used to describe a wide range of techniques which improve the productivity of agricultural, mining and construction equipment. It is most commonly used to describe systems which incorporate GPS, Motion Measuring Units (MMU) and other devices to provide on-board systems with information about the movement of the machine in either 3, 5 or 7 axis of rotation. Feedback to the operator is provided through audio and visual displays which allows improved control of the machine in relation to the intended or designed direction of travel.

== See also ==
- List of emerging technologies
