= Victor Smorgon =

Australian industrialist, arts patron and benefactor

Victor Smorgon AC
- Born: 2 January 1913; Heidelberg, Russian Empire
- Died: 3 July 2009 (aged 96); Melbourne, Victoria, Australia
- Occupation: Businessman
- Known for: Co-founder of Smorgon Consolidated Industries; Companion of the Order of Australia
- Spouse: Loti Smorgon
- Children: Sandra Smorgon Bardas; Ginny Smorgon Green; Vicki Smorgon Vidor; Bindy Smorgon Koadlow
- Parent: Naum Smorgon (father)

Victor Smorgon AC (2 January 1913 – 3 July 2009) was an Australian industrialist, arts patron and benefactor, who was founder and former head of the Victor Smorgon Group.

== Biography ==
Smorgon was born in 1913 in Heidelberg, a German settlement in Ukraine, then part of the Russian Empire. His father, Naum (Norman) Smorgon, ran a kosher butcher shop until the business was nationalized in 1927, with the Smorgon family emigrating to Australia later that year. Naum Smorgon and his brothers resumed the family's kosher butchery in the Melbourne suburb of Carlton North, and Victor entered the wholesale meat business. The success of Victor's meat importing business saw the entire family become involved in the company, and soon Smorgon Consolidated Industries expanded its business to cover plastics, glass, steel and recycling.

By 1995, the collective worth of Smorgon Consolidated Industries' interests in steel, paper, plastics, packaging and property had been estimated at between A$1.2 billion and $1.5 billion. In February of that year, the Smorgon family decided to divest the company (with the exception of the Smorgon Steel Group, Australia's second-largest steel producer, which was floated publicly). The proceeds of the SCI sale were distributed among the seven branches of the Smorgon family in Australia, and re-invested or used to purchase new holdings under the umbrella of the Victor Smorgon Group.

== Personal life ==
In 1937, he married Loti Smorgon in the East Melbourne Synagogue; they had four daughters: Sandra Smorgon Bardas, Ginny Smorgon Green, Vicki Smorgon Vidor and Bindy Smorgon Koadlow. Smorgon died in Melbourne, Australia, on 3 July 2009 aged 96.

== Honours ==
Victor Smorgon was appointed an Officer of the Order of Australia (AO) in 1990 for service to art as a benefactor. Smorgon was appointed a Companion of the Order of Australia (AC) in 2007 for service to the community as a benefactor and supporter of a wide range of organisations, particularly in the areas of art, education and medicine.
