= BRW Rich 200, 2013 =

Annual list of wealthiest Australians

The BRW Rich 200, 2013 is the 30th annual survey of the wealthiest people resident in Australia, published in hardcopy and online formats in the BRW magazine on 24 May 2013. This was the last list published in hardcopy format by the BRW as the final hardcopy issue of the BRW was published in November 2013.

In the 2013 list, the net worth of the wealthiest individual, Gina Rinehart, was A$22.02 billion.

The BRW Rich Families List was published annually since 2008. In the 2013 list, the Smorgon family headed the list with estimated wealth of A$2.64 billion. The Smorgon families headed the families list in every year of its publication. The families list was last published in 2015.

== List of individuals ==
2013		Name	Citizenship	Source of wealth	2012	
Rank	Net worth A$ bn	Name	Citizenship	Source of wealth	Rank	Net worth A$ bn
1	22.02 ▼	Gina Rinehart	Australia	Hancock Prospecting; investment	1	29.17 ▲
2 ▲	6.87 ▲	Frank Lowy AC	Australia	Westfield; property (shopping centres)	3 ▲	6.47 ▲
3 ▲	6.00 ▲	James Packer	Australia	Crown Resorts; Consolidated Media Holdings	6 ▲	5.21 ▲
4 ▲	5.95 ▲	Anthony Pratt	Australia	Visy; Pratt Industries	5 ▼	5.45 ▲
5 ▼	5.61 ▼	Ivan Glasenberg	Australia; South Africa; Switzerland	Glencore commodities trading	2	7.40 ▼
6 ▲	4.95 ▲	Harry Triguboff AO	Australia	Meriton	7	4.85 ▲
7 ▲	4.82 ▲	Hui Wing Mau	China; Australia	Shimao Property	n/a	not listed
8 ▲	3.70 ▲	John Gandel AO	Australia	Property (shopping centres)	10 ▼	3.35 ▼
9 ▼	3.66 ▼	Andrew Forrest	Australia	Fortescue	4 ▼	5.89 ▼
10			Australia			

Legend
Icon	Description
Steady	Has not changed from the previous year's list
▲	Has increased from the previous year's list
▼	Has decreased from the previous year's list

== List of families ==
2013		Name	Citizenship	Source of wealth	2012	
Rank	Net worth A$ bn	Name	Citizenship	Source of wealth	Rank	Net worth A$ bn
1	2.64 ▲	Smorgon family	Australia	Investment	1	2.63 ▼
2	2.10 ▼	Liberman family	Australia	Investment	2	2.20 ▼
2 ▲	2.10 ▼	Besen family	Australia	Property; retail	3	2.15 ▲
n/a	2.10 ▲	Buckeridge family	Australia	Manufacturing (building materials); construction	n/a	2.01 ▼
4 ▲	2.01 ▲	Myer family	Australia	Retail; property; investment	5 ▼	1.94 ▼
5 ▲	1.83 ▲	Wilson family	Australia	Retail (plumbing)	7 ▲	1.44 ▼
6	1.82 ▲	Roberts family	Australia	Investment; property	6	1.75 ▲
7			Australia			
8	1.21 ▼	Talbot family	Australia	Resources	8 ▼	1.29 ▼
9 ▲	1.17 ▲	Salteri family	Australia	Tenix; infrastructure investment (roads and services)	10 ▼	1.09 ▼
10 ▲	1.07 ▲	Tieck family	Australia	Investment; property	11 ▼	1.02 ▼

Legend
Icon	Description
Steady	Has not changed from the previous year's list
▲	Has increased from the previous year's list
▼	Has decreased from the previous year's list

== See also ==
- Financial Review Rich List
- Forbes Asia list of Australians by net worth
