= BRW Rich 200, 2015 =

Annual list of wealthiest Australians

The BRW Rich 200, 2015 is the 32nd annual survey of the wealthiest people resident in Australia, published online by the Australian Financial Review in June 2015.

In the 2015 list, the net worth of the wealthiest individual, Gina Rinehart, was A$14.02 billion.

The BRW Rich Families List was published annually between 2008 and 2015. In every year of its publication the Smorgon family headed the list, with estimated wealth of A$2.74 billion in 2015 spread across seven branches of the family. In 2015 the list comprised fifty families with an entry point of A$302 million. The families list was last published in 2015.

== List of individuals ==
2015		Name	Citizenship	Source of wealth	2014	
Rank	Net worth A$ bn	Name	Citizenship	Source of wealth	Rank	Net worth A$ bn
1	14.02 ▼	Gina Rinehart	Australia	Hancock Prospecting; investment	1	20.01 ▼
2	10.76 ▲	Anthony Pratt	Australia	Visy; Pratt Industries	2 ▲	7.64 ▲
3 ▲	10.23 ▲	Harry Triguboff	Australia	Meriton	8 ▼	5.50 ▲
4	7.84 ▲	Frank Lowy	Australia	Westfield; property (shopping centres)	4 ▼	7.16 ▲
5 ▲	6.89 ▲	Hui Wing Mau	China; Australia	Shimao Property	6 ▲	6.35 ▲
6 ▲	6.14 ▼	Ivan Glasenberg	Australia; South Africa; Switzerland	Glencore commodities trading	5	6.63 ▲
7 ▼	6.08 ▼	James Packer	Australia	Crown Resorts; Consolidated Media Holdings	3	7.19 ▲
8 ▼	4.40 ▲	John Gandel	Australia	Property (shopping centres)	9 ▼	4.08 ▲
9 ▼	2.83 ▼	Andrew Forrest	Australia	Fortescue	7 ▲	5.86 ▲
10 ▲	2.65 ▼	Stan Perron	Australia	Property	11 ▲	2.73 ▲

Legend
Icon	Description
Steady	Has not changed from the previous year's list
▲	Has increased from the previous year's list
▼	Has decreased from the previous year's list

== List of families ==
2015		Family name	Citizenship	Source of wealth	2014	
Rank	Net worth A$ bn	Family name	Citizenship	Source of wealth	Rank	Net worth A$ bn
1	2.74 ▼	Smorgon	Australia	Investment	1	2.77 ▲
2 ▲	2.60 ▲	Wilson	Australia	Retail (plumbing)	3 ▲	2.34 ▲
3 ▼	2.53 ▲	Liberman	Australia	Investment	2	2.45 ▲
4 ▲	2.46 ▲	Buckeridge	Australia	Manufacturing; construction	5	2.19
5 ▼	2.41 ▲	Besen	Australia	Property; retail	4 ▼	2.29 ▲
6	2.08 ▲	Myer	Australia	Retail; property; investment	6 ▼	2.05 ▲
7	1.89 ▲	Roberts	Australia	Investment; property	7 ▲	1.86 ▲
8 ▲	1.25 ▲	Barro	Australia	Building services	12 ▲	1.08 ▲
9	1.20 ▼	Salteri	Australia	Tenix; infrastructure investment	9	1.26 ▲
10	1.17 ▼	Talbot	Australia	Resources	10 ▼	1.18 ▼

Legend
Icon	Description
Steady	Has not changed from the previous year's list
▲	Has increased from the previous year's list
▼	Has decreased from the previous year's list

== See also ==
- Financial Review Rich List
- Forbes Asia list of Australians by net worth
