= BRW Rich 200, 2014 =

Annual list of wealthiest Australians

The BRW Rich 200, 2014 is the 31st annual survey of the wealthiest people resident in Australia, published online by the Australian Financial Review on 26 June 2014.

In the 2014 list, the net worth of the wealthiest individual, Gina Rinehart, was A$14.02 billion. Fourteen women and 186 men made the 2014 list.

The BRW Rich Families List was published annually since 2008. In the 2014 list, the Smorgon family headed the list with estimated wealth of A$2.77 billion. The Smorgon families headed the families list in every year of its publication. The families list was last published in 2015.

== List of individuals ==
2014		Name	Citizenship	Source of wealth	2013	
Rank	Net worth A$ bn	Name	Citizenship	Source of wealth	Rank	Net worth A$ bn
1	20.01 ▼	Gina Rinehart	Australia	Hancock Prospecting; investment	1	22.02 ▼
2 ▲	7.64 ▲	Anthony Pratt	Australia	Visy; Pratt Industries	4 ▲	5.95 ▲
3	7.19 ▲	James Packer	Australia	Crown Resorts; Consolidated Media Holdings	3 ▲	$6.00 ▲
4 ▼	7.16 ▲	Frank Lowy AC	Australia	Westfield; property (shopping centres)	2 ▲	6.87 ▲
5	6.63 ▲	Ivan Glasenberg	Australia; South Africa; Switzerland	Glencore commodities trading	5 ▼	5.61 ▼
6 ▲	6.35 ▲	Hui Wing Mau	China; Australia	Shimao Property	7 ▲	4.82 ▲
7 ▲	5.86 ▲	Andrew Forrest	Australia	Fortescue	9 ▼	3.66 ▼
8	4.40 ▲	John Gandel AO	Australia	Property (shopping centres)	8 ▲	3.70 ▲
9 ▼	4.08 ▲	Harry Triguboff AO	Australia	Meriton	6 ▲	4.95 ▲
10 ▲	3.35 ▲	Kerr Neilson	Australia	Financial services	13 ▲	2.43 ▲

Legend
Icon	Description
Steady	Has not changed from the previous year's list
▲	Has increased from the previous year's list
▼	Has decreased from the previous year's list

== List of families ==
2014		Name	Citizenship	Source of wealth	2013	
Rank	Net worth A$ bn	Name	Citizenship	Source of wealth	Rank	Net worth A$ bn
1	2.77 ▲	Smorgon family	Australia	Investment	1	2.64 ▲
2	2.45 ▲	Liberman family	Australia	Investment	2	2.10 ▼
3 ▲	2.34 ▲	Wilson family	Australia	Retail (plumbing)	5 ▲	1.83 ▲
4 ▼	2.29 ▲	Besen family	Australia	Property; retail	2 ▲	2.10 ▼
5	2.19	Buckeridge family	Australia	Manufacturing (building materials); construction	n/a	2.10 ▲
6 ▼	2.05 ▲	Myer family	Australia	Retail; property; investment	4 ▲	2.01 ▲
7 ▲	1.86 ▲	Roberts family	Australia	Investment; property	6	1.82 ▲
8			Australia			
9	1.26 ▲	Salteri family	Australia	Tenix; infrastructure investment (roads and services)	9 ▲	1.17 ▲
10 ▼	1.18 ▼	Talbot family	Australia	Resources	8	1.21 ▼

Legend
Icon	Description
Steady	Has not changed from the previous year's list
▲	Has increased from the previous year's list
▼	Has decreased from the previous year's list

== See also ==
- Financial Review Rich List
- Forbes Asia list of Australians by net worth
