= BRW Rich 200, 2012 =

Annual list of wealthiest Australians

The BRW Rich 200, 2012 is the 29th annual survey of the wealthiest people resident in Australia, published in hardcopy and online formats in the BRW magazine on 24 May 2012.

In the 2012 list, the net worth of the wealthiest individual, Gina Rinehart, was A$29.17 billion.

The BRW Rich Families List was published annually since 2008. In the 2012 list, the Smorgon family headed the list with estimated wealth of A$2.63 billion. The Smorgon families headed the families list in every year of its publication. The families list was last published in 2015.

== List of individuals ==
2012		Name	Citizenship	Source of wealth	2011	
Rank	Net worth A$ bn	Name	Citizenship	Source of wealth	Rank	Net worth A$ bn
1	29.17 ▲	Gina Rinehart	Australia	Hancock; resources; investment	1 ▲	10.31 ▲
2	7.40 ▼	Ivan Glasenberg	Australia; South Africa; Switzerland	Glencore; commodities trading	2 ▲	8.80 ▲
3 ▲	6.47 ▲	Frank Lowy	Australia	Westfield; property	6 ▼	4.98 ▼
4 ▼	5.89 ▼	Andrew Forrest	Australia	Fortescue; resources	3 ▲	6.18 ▲
5 ▼	5.45 ▲	Anthony Pratt	Australia	Visy; Pratt Industries; manufacturing	4 ▼	5.18 ▲
6 ▲	5.21 ▲	James Packer	Australia	Crown Resorts; Consolidated Media Holdings; gaming; media	8 ▼	4.16
7	4.85 ▲	Harry Triguboff	Australia	Meriton	7 ▼	4.30 ▲
8 ▼	3.85 ▼	Clive Palmer	Australia	Mineralogy; mining; hospitality	5 ▲	5.05 ▲
9						
10 ▼	3.35 ▼	John Gandel	Australia	Property	9 ▼	3.45 ▲

Legend
Icon	Description
Steady	Has not changed from the previous year's list
▲	Has increased from the previous year's list
▼	Has decreased from the previous year's list

== List of families ==
2012		Family name	Citizenship	Source of wealth	2011	
Rank	Net worth A$ bn	Family name	Citizenship	Source of wealth	Rank	Net worth A$ bn
1	2.63 ▼	Smorgon	Australia	Investment	1	2.69 ▲
2	2.20 ▼	Liberman	Australia	Investment	2	2.23 ▼
3	2.15 ▲	Besen	Australia	Property; retail	3	2.08 ▲
n/a	2.01 ▼	Buckeridge	Australia	Manufacturing; construction	n/a	2.60 ▲
5 ▼	1.94 ▼	Myer	Australia	Retail; property; investment	4	2.01 ▲
6	1.75 ▲	Roberts	Australia	Investment; property	6	1.35 ▲
7 ▲	1.44 ▼	Wilson	Australia	Retail (plumbing)	n/a	not listed
8 ▼	1.29 ▼	Talbot	Australia	Resources	5	1.42 ▲
9						
10 ▼	1.09 ▼	Salteri	Australia	Tenix; infrastructure investment	7	1.18 ▼

Legend
Icon	Description
Steady	Has not changed from the previous year's list
▲	Has increased from the previous year's list
▼	Has decreased from the previous year's list

== See also ==
- Financial Review Rich List
- Forbes Asia list of Australians by net worth
