= BRW Rich 200, 2011 =

Annual list of wealthiest Australians

The BRW Rich 200, 2011 is the 28th annual survey of the wealthiest people resident in Australia, published in hardcopy and online formats in the BRW magazine on 25 May 2011.

In the 2011 list, the net worth of the wealthiest individual, Gina Rinehart, was A$10.31 billion.

The BRW Rich Families List was published annually since 2008. In the 2011 list, the Smorgon family headed the list with estimated wealth of A$2.69 billion. The Smorgon families headed the families list in every year of its publication. The families list was last published in 2015.

== List of individuals ==
2011		Name	Citizenship	Source of wealth	2010	
Rank	Net worth A$ bn	Name	Citizenship	Source of wealth	Rank	Net worth A$ bn
1 ▲	10.31 ▲	Gina Rinehart	Australia	Hancock Prospecting; investment	5 ▼	4.75 ▲
2 ▲	8.80 ▲	Ivan Glasenberg	Australia; South Africa; Switzerland	Glencore commodities trading		
3 ▲	6.18 ▲	Andrew Forrest	Australia	Fortescue	4 ▲	4.24 ▲
4 ▼	5.18 ▲	Anthony Pratt	Australia	Visy; Pratt Industries	2 ▼	4.60 ▲
5 ▲	5.05 ▲	Clive Palmer	Australia	Mineralogy and other mining interests; hospitality	7	
6 ▼	4.98 ▼	Frank Lowy	Australia	Westfield; property (shopping centres)	1 ▲	5.04 ▲
7 ▼	4.30 ▲	Harry Triguboff	Australia	Meriton		
8 ▼	4.16	James Packer	Australia	Crown Resorts; Consolidated Media Holdings	6	4.10 ▼
9 ▼	3.45 ▲	John Gandel	Australia	Property (shopping centres)		
10			Australia			

Legend
Icon	Description
Steady	Has not changed from the previous year's list
▲	Has increased from the previous year's list
▼	Has decreased from the previous year's list

== List of families ==
2011		Family name	Citizenship	Source of wealth	2010	
Rank	Net worth A$ bn	Family name	Citizenship	Source of wealth	Rank	Net worth A$ bn
1	2.69 ▲	Smorgon	Australia	Investment		
n/a	2.60 ▲	Buckeridge	Australia	Manufacturing; construction		
2	2.23 ▼	Liberman	Australia	Investment		
3	2.08 ▲	Besen	Australia	Property; retail		
4 ▲	2.01 ▲	Myer	Australia	Retail; property; investment		
5 ▼	1.42 ▲	Talbot	Australia	Resources		
6	1.35 ▲	Roberts	Australia	Investment; property		
7 ▼	1.18 ▼	Salteri	Australia	Tenix; infrastructure investment		
8						
9						
10						

Legend
Icon	Description
Steady	Has not changed from the previous year's list
▲	Has increased from the previous year's list
▼	Has decreased from the previous year's list

== See also ==
- Financial Review Rich List
- Forbes Asia list of Australians by net worth
