= RewardsCentral =

- Type: Private company
- Industry: online marketing
- Founded: June 1999; 27 years ago in Australia
- Headquarters: Level 10, 201 Pacific Highway, St Leonards, Sydney, New South Wales, Australia
- Key people: Bob Cheng (founder and managing director)
- Revenue: revenue A$5.2 million (2005)
- Website: www.rewardscentral.com.au

RewardsCentral (formerly EmailCash Marketing, formerly TEMPNAME) is an Australian website run by PermissionCorp, with branches for residents of Australia, Taiwan, New Zealand (SmileCity), and United Kingdom (Rewards Central). The company was founded by Bob Cheng in Sydney, Australia, in 1999. EmailCash was ranked 40th in Business Review Weekly's Fast 100 index for 2004.

== Operation ==
The company was based on a reward program, the company rewards members with points when they perform certain tasks. These include participation in market research surveys, completion of promotional offers, a daily 'Quick Survey' and visiting specified websites.
