= MyNetFone =

Australian telecommunications company

- Type: Public
- Industry: Telecommunications; Internet service provider
- Founded: Sydney, Australia (2004)
- Headquarters: Sydney, Australia
- Area served: Australia
- Products: Residential VoIP phone plan Business Voice Communications; Residential DSL Internet Plans; Business Boardband; Phone Hardware; Virtual BPX; Business Phone Systems; NBN Plans; Virtual Fax; Digital lines (SIP Trunking); Enhanced Services-Special Service Numbers (13/1300/1800), Meet-Me Conferencing, MyText SMS, Number Porting (IP) Telecommunications
- Website: www.mynetfone.com.au

MyNetFone Australia Pty Ltd is part of the MNF Group, the company that owns and operates Australia's largest VoIP network, which is also the 3rd largest interconnected voice network in the country. MyNetFone provides broadband internet and cloud-based communication services to residential, business and government sectors.

The MNF Group encompasses multiple brands in the voice and data industries including the following: CallStream, Connexus, PennyTel, iBoss, TNZI, OCA (OpenCA) Softswitch, MyNetFone (retail) and Symbio Networks.

Foundation business of the MNF Group – MyNetFone was established in 2004 by co-founders Rene Sugo (CEO) and Andy Fung (NonExec. Director & former CEO), originally as a retail VoIP provider, and diversified into the corporate market in 2008. Today, MyNetFone provides a full suite of corporate voice, fax and data services – including the proprietary Virtual PBX phone system. The company was first listed on the Australian Securities Exchange (ASX:MNF) in May 2006.

The company was awarded Forbes 'Asia's Best Under a Billion' (2014), Australia's fastest growing ASX-listed telco (Business Review Weekly Fast 100 2014), Deloitte Technology Fast 500 Asia Pacific (2015, 2016), Australian Financial Review Fast 100 (2017).

== Company Background ==
The company was founded in 2004 and employs around 300 staff across four states of Australia. Its headquarter are located in Sydney, NSW. MyNetFone is a provider of cloud-based communication and Internet services to business, government and residential sectors. The company owns and operates the largest VoIP (voice over internet protocol) network in Australia and operates internationally as well, supplying services to Australia, New Zealand and Singapore. MNF Group is reported to carry more than 7 billion international voice minutes annually – accounting for 3% of global voice communications.

== Company history ==
In 2004 MyNetFone was co-founded by Rene Sugo and Andy Fung. In May 2006 it was listed on the Australian Securities Exchange. In August of the same year, MyNetFone expanded to provide services in New Zealand and Singapore.

MyNetFone also announced in 2006 that they would offer combined VoIP and internet solutions for SME and business enterprise market. In September 2006 MyNetFone acquired a new subsidiary, Broad IP Pty Limited. This was the MyNetFone's first acquisition.

In 2007 MyNetFone again announced new services. The first was a mobile VOIP service, called MNF On-the-Go, which expended to include smartphone apps and mobile VoIP software. The second service announced in 2007 was a call redirect feature called ‘Follow Me” which can redirect incoming calls to any landline or mobile number in the world.

In May 2008 MyNetFone launched the Virtual PBX, a hosted IP PBX services for the SME market. They also began offering a SIP (session Initiation Protocol) service and a VoIP only phone system.

In August 2011, MyNetFone acquired Symbio Networks, Australia's largest VoIP wholesale provider

In May 2012 MyNetFone was certified by Australia's National Broadband Network (NBN) to provide services to consumers and businesses and launched several NBN plans. The NBN is an Australian government internet initiative which aims to provide the nation with greater coverage and faster streaming internet through the development of fibre Optic cabling and satellite services.

In July 2012 MyNetFone was selected by the Tasmanian Government to provide its telephony services. At the time, no other Australian government had begun using VoIP services for their communications.

In November 2012, MyNetFone acquired CallStream, a company focused on inbound calls, as well as Connexus, a business Internet service provider. Also in 2012, MyNetFone entered an agreement to acquire the network and wholesale business of ‘GoTalk’, a Sydney-based voice carrier

‘PennyTel’ and ‘iVoiSys’, two Sydney-based VoIP resellers, were acquired by MyNetFone in October 2013, followed by iBoss, a billing, operations, provisioning and central management system acquired in 2014.

In 2015 the company expanded in New Zealand, acquiring TNZI for NZ$22.4 million. Later that year the company rebranded, as it had become a large and sophisticated group, trading under multiple brand names in a global market, and changed its name to MNF Group giving recognition to the original heritage of “My Net Fone.

For the first half of financial year 2016 MNF Group reported revenues of AU$83.98 million and net profits of AU$4 million.

In 2017, MNF Group acquired Conference Call International (CCI), the largest independent conferencing and collaboration provider in Australia for $18.0m.

In August 2021, MyNetFone's residential and small to medium business services were acquired by Vonex for $31 million.

== Awards ==
- Deloitte Technology Fast 500 Asia Pacific (2015, 2016)
- Australian Financial Review Fast 100 (2017)
- Forbes 'Asia's Best Under a Billion' (2014),
- Australia's fastest growing ASX-listed telco (Business Review Weekly Fast 100 2014)
- Cebit Award for Outstanding Project 2013 – Winner
- Deloitte Technology Fast 50 Australia Awards (2008, 2009, 2010, 2012, 2013)
- Deloitte Technology Fast 500 Asia Pacific Awards (2008, 2009, 2010, 2012, 2013)
- BRW Fast Starters (2008, 2009, 2010)
- City of Sydney Business Awards 2009 – Winner – Information & Communication Technology Category
- Money Magazine Best of the Best Awards 2007 – Gold Winner – Best VoIP Plan, Business User
- Money Magazine Best of the Best Awards 2007 – Silver Winner – Best VoIP Plan, Residential User
- PC User Product of the Year Awards 2005 – Winner – Communication Product of the Year
- PC User Product of the Year Awards 2005 – Winner – Overall Product of the Year
