= PHPA =

PHPA may refer to:

- Professional Hockey Players' Association
- Port Hedland Port Authority
