= Transfield =

Transfield may refer to:

- Broadspectrum, formerly Transfield Services, Australian company established in 2001
- Transfield Holdings, Australian company established in 1956
