= Port Hedland Harbour Tunnel =

Overview
- Location: Port Hedland, Western Australia
- Crosses: Port of Port Hedland
- Start: Nelson Point
- End: Finucane Island

Operation
- Owner: BHP

Technical
- Length: 1,030 metres (3,380 ft)
- Width: 5.1 metres (17 ft) external diameter

The Port Hedland Harbour Tunnel is a 1,030-metre-long (3,380 ft) bored tunnel in Port Hedland, Western Australia. Owned by BHP, the tunnel carries iron ore fines on a conveyor belt from the company's Nelson Point stockyards to a hot briquetted iron plant on Finucane Island, passing under the Port of Port Hedland. The tunnel was constructed by a tunnel boring machine by Transfield and Kumagai Gumi for A$23.19 million.

== Description ==
The Port Hedland Harbour Tunnel connects BHP's Nelson Point stockyards to a hot briquetted iron plant on Finucane Island, passing under the Port of Port Hedland. The tunnel carries a 1.8-metre-wide (5.9 ft) conveyor belt capable of carrying 10,000 tonnes (11,000 tons) of iron ore fines per hour, as well as a maintenance walkway. The tunnel is 1,030 metres (3,380 ft) long and has an external diameter of 5.1 metres (17 ft). It passes under the port's dredged channel with a clearance of 8 metres (26 ft), requiring extensive and steep gradients of 1:6 on each side.

== History ==
By 1994, BHP had identified the need for a conveyor belt crossing the harbour for its proposed hot briquetted iron plant. In early 1994, the company assessed four options: an above ground conveyor belt going around the harbour, a bridge over, a immersed tube tunnel, or a bored tunnel. The above ground conveyor was rejected because of the distance required and for its environmental impact; the bridge was rejected due to the height needed to surpass the bulk carriers using the port and due to the frequent cyclones that impact Port Hedland. The immersed tube was attractive because it had been previously used in Australia for the Sydney Harbour Tunnel, but because there had previously been difficulty in dredging Port Hedland's harbour, and because it would disrupt port operations during construction, the immersed tube tunnel was ruled out.

The Government of Western Australia approved the tunnel in August 1995. Later that month, BHP awarded the A$23.19 million construction contract to Transfield and Kumagai Gumi, with construction scheduled to commence in October 1995 and be finished in February 1997.

Construction began on 3 October 1997, delayed because the original drill bit was not abrasive enough. The tunnel was constructing using an earth pressure balance tunnel boring machine (TBM) between an in situ concrete portal structure at either end. The TBM was manufactured by Lovat Inc. The TBM was launched from the Finucane Island side.

== See also ==
- List of tunnels in Australia
