= Transfield Holdings =

Australian investment company

- Founded: 1956
- Founder: Franco Belgiorno-Nettis; Carlo Salteri
- Headquarters: Walsh Bay, New South Wales, Australia
- Owner: Guido Belgiorno-Nettis; Luca Belgiorno-Nettis
- Website: transfield.com.au

Transfield Holdings is a privately owned Australian investment company with experience in industrial services, infrastructure, and renewable energy.

== History ==
Transfield Holdings's origins can be traced to 1956 when an Italian-born immigrant electrical engineer, Franco Belgiorno-Nettis, who was joined soon after by Carlo Salteri, a former colleague from Electric Power Transmission, an offshoot of Milan based Societa' Anonima Elettrificazione, which was constructing powerlines. The logo, designed by Belgiorno-Nettis, reflected its electricity industry origins; it was intended to represent a high-voltage transmission tower, with an accompanying red electrical spark.

Transfield's first contract was for the fabrication and installation of a soaking pit and slab mill for Australian Iron & Steel at Port Kembla. In May 1957, sixteen hectares of land was purchased in the Western Sydney suburb of Seven Hills. In 1958 Transfield won its first major contract, to build of the powerline from Magill to Port Augusta in South Australia. Another early project was a chairlift at Thredbo, the longest in the world at the time.

In 1965, subsidiary Transavia Corporation commenced producing the Transavia PL-12 Airtruk agricultural aircraft.

Together Belgiorno-Nettis and Saltieri built Transfield into one of Australia's most successful companies focused on major engineering projects such as bridges, tunnels, dams, hydroelectric and coal power stations, oil rigs, concert halls, sugar mills and power lines. Included in Transfield's list of achievements are the construction of the Gateway Bridge in Brisbane and the Sydney Harbour Tunnel. By the early 1980s, Transfield had in excess of 3,000 employees and an annual turnover of $350 million. Within five years it grew to be the biggest engineering firm in southeast Asia. When visiting Australia in 1986 Pope John Paul II toured the Transfield factory located at Seven Hills.

Transfield established a naval shipbuilding capability in Australia with the acquisition of Williamstown Dockyard in Melbourne in 1989. In the early 1990s, it built two Oliver Hazard Perry class frigates for the Royal Australian Navy.

In 1989, Belgiorno-Nettis and Salteri stood down as joint managing directors in favour of their eldest sons, Marco Belgiorno-Zegna and Paul Salteri.

After a dispute between Belgiorno-Nettis and Salteri in 1995, the business was split, with the Belgiorno-Nettis family taking the construction and infrastructure side of the business, and the Salteris the defence and shipbuilding work under the name Tenix.

In May 2001, the operations and maintenance division was spun-off and listed on the Australian Securities Exchange as Transfield Services with Transfield Holdings having a 45% shareholding. In December 2002, the construction business was sold to John Holland.

In September 2014, Transfield Holdings sold its remaining shareholding in Transfield Services. In 2015, Transfield Holdings transformed from a private equity business into an investment holding company, managed by the respective family offices of Guido and Luca Belgiorno-Nettis.

== Major projects ==
Major projects undertaken included:

- Morwell Power Station, completed in 1956
- Barron Gorge Hydroelectric Power Station civil works, completed in 1963
- Muja Power Station, completed in 1966
- Munmorah Power Station, completed in 1967
- Liddell Power Station, completed in 1973
- Vales Point Power Station civil works, completed in 1978
- Eraring Power Station boiler structures & turbine houses, completed in 1982
- Loy Yang Power Station, completed in 1985
- Bayswater Power Station boiler structures & turbine houses, completed in 1986
- Gateway Bridge, completed in 1986
- Tarong Power Station cooling towers, completed in 1986
- Skitube, completed in 1988
- Sydney Harbour Tunnel, completed in 1992
- Mount Piper Power Station boiler structures & turbine houses, completed in 1993
- Taichung Power Plant coal loading system, completed in 1993
- Port Hedland Harbour Tunnel, completed in 1999
- CityLink, completed in 1999
- Townsville Power Station, completed in 1999
- Airport Link, Sydney, completed in 2000
- Eastern Gas Pipeline, completed in 2000
- Graham Farmer Freeway, completed in 2000
- Windan Bridge, completed in 2000

== Investments ==
- Sydney Harbour Tunnel
- Airport Link Company
- Airtrain Citylink
- Anzac-class frigate
- Blue Cow Mountain
- CityLink
- Perisher Ski Resort
- Skitube

== Sabemo ==
Sabemo was a subsidiary of Transfield Holdings that built Edgewater and Joondalup railway stations in Perth.

== Patronage of the Arts ==
During its first fifty years of operations Transfield's contribution to the arts has enriched and changed for good Australia's cultural landscape. It has always been Franco Belgiorno-Nettis' cherished belief that inventiveness in new art is encouraging innovation in business and industry. He often stated that "artists and engineers have a lot in common: they both have an idea and make it concrete". Franco also, as he put it, "felt I could be an unofficial ambassador, use Transfield to build a link between Italian and Australian culture".

=== The Transfield Art Prize ===
In 1961 the company launched the Transfield Art Prize, at that time the richest in Australia, at £1,000. The Prize made a significant contribution in developing the wealth of talent among Australian artists, launched some of them to international notoriety, such as Fred Williams, the 1964 winner, and gave Transfield the opportunity to establish close links with the Australian political, financial and business world. The Prize was discontinued in 1971, when Transfield realised that something else could be done in a more meaningful way.

The winners were:

1. 1961 - John Molvig, City Industrial
2. 1962 - Andrew Sibley, Bathers
3. 1963 - Maximillion Feuerring, Still Life
4. 1964 - Fred Williams, You Yangs
5. 1965 - Roger Kemp, Genesis
6. 1966 - Norma Redpath, Immortal Warrior
7. 1967 - William Rose, Painting
8. 1968 - John Peart, Bivuac
9. 1969 - Ron Robertson-Swann, Sydney Summer
10. 1970 - Bill Clements, Ready for 6th August
11. 1971 - Aleks Danko, Carnival

=== The Australian Book Review - Transfield Book Production Awards ===
in 1963, the company, in association with the Australian Book Review, launched the Australian Book Review-Transfield Book Production Awards, aimed at raising the standard of literary culture and design of quality books in Australia. The £350 Awards were made until 1968.

=== The Foundry ===
In June 1968, Transfield established, at a cost of $25,000, the first Australian foundry for sculpture at its Seven Hills factory, making these facilities available to artists at subsidised cost. Franco was particularly fond of his Sculpture Studio, where he cast his own works.

=== Biennale of Sydney ===
It was the establishment of the Biennale of Sydney, in November 1973, that constitutes the most important contribution to Australian and international arts by Transfield. From 1973, when Prime Minister Gough Whitlam officially opened the first Biennale at the newly opened Sydney Opera House until today, Transfield has been the major sponsor of this event. During the span of over 30 years, the company probably invested over $6 million in-kind and cash to the fifteen Biennales. Amongst other contributions, it refurbished the Biennale venues at Pier 2/3 and Bond Store 4, Walsh Bay for three Biennales. It has also provided three chairmen, including Franco, Guido and Luca Belgiorno-Nettis.
