= Finucane Island =

Island in Western Australia

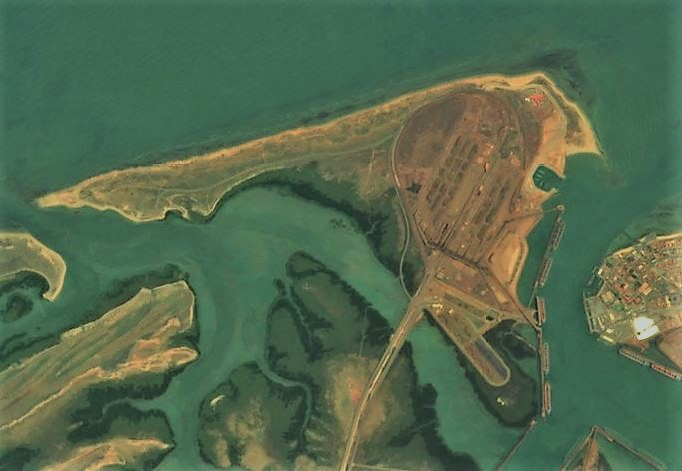
- Satellite image of Finucane Island
- Location of Finucane Island in Western Australia
- Location within Western Australia

Geography
- Location: Indian Ocean
- Coordinates: 20°18′16″S 118°33′04″E

Administration
- Australia
- State: Western Australia
- LGA: Town of Port Hedland

Finucane Island is located adjacent to Port Hedland in the Pilbara region of Western Australia. It is within the area that is governed by the Port Hedland Port Authority, and the location of the loading of the first shipments of iron ore from the region, and the port.

The work on the port commenced in February 1965.

Iron ore was first delivered to Finucane Island from Goldsworthy on 1 December 1965.

24,900 tonnes of ore was delivered to the Harvey S. Mudd on 26 June 1966.

In 1999, the Port Hedland Harbour Tunnel opened, connecting Finucane Island to Nelson Point by a conveyor belt.
