= Financial Review Rich List =

List of the 200 wealthiest individuals and families in Australia

(formerly known as the BRW Rich 200)
- List of 200 Australians, ranked in order of net worth

Publication details
- Publisher: Nine Entertainment
- Publication: Australian Financial Review
- First published: 1984 (as BRW Rich 100)
- Latest publication: 30 May 2025

Current list details (2025)
- Wealthiest Australian: Gina Rinehart
- Net worth (1st): ▼ A$38.11 billion
- Entry point (200th): ▲ A$747 million
- Total list net worth value: ▲ A$667 billion
- Average net worth: ▲ A$3.35 billion
- Gender bias: ▲42 women; ▼158 men

The Financial Review Rich List, formerly known as the BRW Rich 200, is a list of Australia's two hundred wealthiest individuals and families, ranked by personal net worth published annually in The Australian Financial Review Magazine, a supplement of the Australian Financial Review, published by Nine Entertainment. The list provides a short summary on some of the known business activities of the individuals and families, together with commentary on how their ranking has changed from the previous year, if listed.

The list was historically released annually in May or June in a special issue of the Business Review Weekly (BRW), published by Fairfax Media. The final hardcopy issue of BRW was published in November 2013, and between 2014 and March 2016, the list was published online only. In March 2016 the BRW Rich 200 was published in hardcopy in The Australian Financial Review Magazine (or AFR Magazine), and published online on the Financial Review website. In 2017, the list was renamed as the Financial Review Rich List, published in both print and online. The most recent list was published in May 2025.

In 2025, the entry mark for the 200th richest individual was A$747 million; and the wealthiest individual in the 2025 list was Gina Rinehart, estimated to have a personal net worth of A$38.11 billion. Rinehart held the mantle of Australia's wealthiest individual between 2011 and 2015; and was also the wealthiest individual in every year since 2020, when her net worth was assessed at A$28.89 bn. Rinehart succeeded Anthony Pratt and family, who held the mantle of Australia's wealthiest individual between 2017 and 2019, and also in 2009. Pratt succeeded Harry Triguboff who topped the list in 2016, when it was estimated he had a personal net worth of A$10.62 billion.

Seven individuals and/or families have made every list; including Lindsay Fox, John Gandel, Solomon Lew, Frank Lowy, Alan Rydge, Kerry Stokes, and Harry Triguboff.

In 2014 fourteen women and 186 men made the BRW Rich 200 list; and by 2017 the number of women had increased to fifteen women; increased to nineteen women (either jointly or severally) in the list published in 2018; in 2019, twenty-six women were included on the 2019 Rich List, representing 13 percent of the total list; in 2020, the number of women included on the list, either jointly or severally, increased to 30 women; and increased again to 39 women on the 2021 list; representing 19.5 percent of the total list. It 2023, the number of women decreased to 36, the first decrease in many years; and it has increased every year since, standing at 42 women in the 2025 list.

== Background and history ==
The Financial Review Rich List was first published in 1984 as the BRW Rich 100, with an entry point of A$10 million, that profiled 144 people and 20 families.

In 2008 it was the first time in more than 20 years that Kerry or James Packer had not headed the list. Andrew Forrest was listed as the richest person in Australia, with a net worth estimated at A$9.41 billion, with James Packer listed third with A$6.1 billion. In 2009 Pratt was top of the list with A$4.3 billion. In 2010, the founder of Westfield, Frank Lowy, who has appeared on the list every year, was Australia's richest individual with an assessed personal net worth of A$5.04 billion. Rinehart held the mantle between 2011 and 2015; and Triguboff in 2016. Pratt held the mantle again, between 2017 and 2019. Rinehart returned in 2020 as Australia's wealthiest individual, and retained the mantle in every year since.

The list has sometimes caught the ire of those profiled. In an essay celebrating the 25th anniversary of the BRW, Jefferson Penberthy, the founding editor of the BRW Rich 100 wrote that Australian entrepreneur Dick Smith, at one stage valued at A$50 million, did not want to appear on the list. When told that the cut off was A$35 million, Smith publicly divested A$20 million to charities.

The Financial Review Rich List excludes individuals who have renounced their Australian citizenship. For example, despite Rupert Murdoch being born in Australia and having a personal net worth of US$7.6 billion in 2011, due to Murdoch becoming a naturalised US citizen in 1985, he was excluded from the list.

The BRW Rich Families List was first published annually between 2008 and 2015. In every year of its publication the Smorgon family has headed the list, with estimated wealth of A$2.74 billion in 2015 spread across seven branches of the family. In 2015 the list comprised fifty families with an entry point of A$302 million. The families list has not been published in hard copy or online since 2015.

On 4 March 2016, Fairfax Media announced the closure of the BRW website, and redirected the site to a new section of the Australian Financial Review. Rich lists are now published in The Australian Financial Review Magazine and in 2017 were rebranded as the Financial Review Rich List.

The Financial Review Rich List is one list in a series of lists published by the Financial Review and/or were previously published by the BRW. Other lists included:

- the BRW Rich series; covering BRW Executive Rich, BRW Young Rich, and BRW Rich Summer
- the BRW Fast list series; covering BRW Fast Starters, BRW Fast Franchises, and BRW Fast 100
- the BRW Top list series; covering Top 1000 Companies, Top 50 Entertainers, and Top 500 Private Companies

== Lists by year ==
- BRW Rich 100, 1984
- BRW Rich 200, 1985
- BRW Rich 200, 1986
- BRW Rich 200, 1987
- BRW Rich 200, 1988
- BRW Rich 200, 1989
- BRW Rich 200, 1990
- BRW Rich 200, 1991
- BRW Rich 200, 1992
- BRW Rich 200, 1993
- BRW Rich 200, 1994
- BRW Rich 200, 1995
- BRW Rich 200, 1996
- BRW Rich 200, 1997
- BRW Rich 200, 1998
- BRW Rich 200, 1999
- BRW Rich 200, 2000
- BRW Rich 200, 2001
- BRW Rich 200, 2002
- BRW Rich 200, 2003
- BRW Rich 200, 2004
- BRW Rich 200, 2005
- BRW Rich 200, 2006
- BRW Rich 200, 2007
- BRW Rich 200, 2008
- BRW Rich 200, 2009
- BRW Rich 200, 2010
- BRW Rich 200, 2011
- BRW Rich 200, 2012
- BRW Rich 200, 2013
- BRW Rich 200, 2014
- BRW Rich 200, 2015
- BRW Rich 200, 2016
- Financial Review Rich List, 2017
- Financial Review Rich List, 2018
- Financial Review Rich List, 2019
- Financial Review Rich List, 2020
- Financial Review Rich List, 2021
- Financial Review Rich List, 2022
- Financial Review Rich List, 2023
- Financial Review Rich List, 2024
- Financial Review Rich List, 2025

== Past richest Australian ==
Year	Name	Net worth A$ billion	Sources of wealth
1984	Kerry Packer	0.20	Publishing & Broadcasting Limited; Consolidated Media Holdings
1985	Robert Holmes à Court	0.30	Bell Resources; diversified investment
1986	Khoo Teck Puat	0.60	Diversified investment
1987	Robert Holmes à Court	1.40	Bell Resources; diversified investment
1988	Kerry Packer	1.50	Publishing & Broadcasting Limited; Consolidated Media Holdings
1989	Kerry Packer	1.80 ▲	Publishing & Broadcasting Limited; Consolidated Media Holdings
1990	Kerry Packer	1.85 ▲	Publishing & Broadcasting Limited; Consolidated Media Holdings
1991	Kerry Packer	1.90 ▲	Publishing & Broadcasting Limited; Consolidated Media Holdings
1992	Kerry Packer	2.70 ▲	Publishing & Broadcasting Limited; Consolidated Media Holdings
1993	Kerry Packer	3.00 ▲	Publishing & Broadcasting Limited; Consolidated Media Holdings
1994	Kerry Packer	5.50 ▲	Publishing & Broadcasting Limited; Consolidated Media Holdings
1995	Kerry Packer	3.00 ▼	Publishing & Broadcasting Limited; Consolidated Media Holdings
1996	Kerry Packer	3.30 ▲	Publishing & Broadcasting Limited; Consolidated Media Holdings
1997	Kerry Packer	3.90 ▲	Publishing & Broadcasting Limited; Consolidated Media Holdings
1998	Kerry Packer	5.20 ▲	Publishing & Broadcasting Limited; Consolidated Media Holdings
1999	Kerry Packer	6.40 ▲	Publishing & Broadcasting Limited; Consolidated Media Holdings
2000	Kerry Packer	8.20 ▲	Publishing & Broadcasting Limited; Consolidated Media Holdings
2001	Kerry Packer	6.20 ▼	Publishing & Broadcasting Limited; Consolidated Media Holdings
2002	Kerry Packer	5.90 ▼	Publishing & Broadcasting Limited; Consolidated Media Holdings
2003	Kerry Packer	5.50 ▼	Publishing & Broadcasting Limited; Consolidated Media Holdings
2004	Kerry Packer	6.50 ▲	Publishing & Broadcasting Limited; Consolidated Media Holdings
2005	Kerry Packer	6.90 ▲	Publishing & Broadcasting Limited; Consolidated Media Holdings
2006	James Packer	7.10 ▲	Media; entertainment (gaming); investment
2007	James Packer	7.25 ▲	Media; entertainment (gaming); investment
2008	Andrew Forrest	9.41 ▲	Fortescue
2009	Anthony Pratt & family	4.30 ▼	Visy; investment
2010	Frank Lowy	5.04 ▲	Westfield; property (shopping centres)
2011	Gina Rinehart	10.31 ▲	Hancock Prospecting; media; investment
2012	Gina Rinehart	29.17 ▲	Hancock Prospecting; media; investment
2013	Gina Rinehart	22.02 ▼	Hancock Prospecting; media; investment
2014	Gina Rinehart	20.01 ▼	Hancock Prospecting; media; investment
2015	Gina Rinehart	14.02 ▼	Hancock Prospecting; media; investment
2016	Harry Triguboff	10.62 ▲	Meriton; construction
2017	Anthony Pratt & family	12.60 ▲	Visy; investment
2018	Anthony Pratt & family	12.90 ▲	Visy; investment
2019	Anthony Pratt & family	15.57 ▲	Visy; investment
2020	Gina Rinehart	28.89 ▲	Hancock Prospecting; resources; agriculture
2021	Gina Rinehart	31.06 ▲	Hancock Prospecting; resources; agriculture
2022	Gina Rinehart	34.00 ▲	Hancock Prospecting; resources; agriculture
2023	Gina Rinehart	37.41 ▲	Hancock Prospecting; resources; agriculture
2024	Gina Rinehart	40.61 ▲	Hancock Prospecting; resources; agriculture
2025	Gina Rinehart	38.11 ▼	Hancock Prospecting; resources; agriculture

Legend
Icon	Description
Steady	Has not changed from the previous year
▲	Has increased from the previous year
▼	Has decreased from the previous year

== See also ==
- Forbes Asia: Australia's 50 Richest, an annual published list of rich individuals in Australia, by Forbes Asia magazine
- Forbes China Rich List, the annual published list of rich individuals in China
- Challenges Les 500, the annual published list of rich individuals in France
- Forbes Korean Rich List, the annual published list of rich individuals in South Korea
- Sunday Times Rich List, the annual published list of rich individuals in the United Kingdom
- Forbes 400, the annual published list of rich individuals in the United States of America
- BRW Fast Starters
- Australian Financial Review
