= Pennytel =

Australian telecommunications company

- Type: Public
- Industry: Telecommunications
- Headquarters: Sydney, Australia
- Area served: Australia
- Products: Virtual PBX, Office phone systems, NBN, ADSL, Mobile
- Website: pennytel.com.au

Connexus was an Australian-owned and operated business telecommunications provider founded in 1989 and based in Sydney, Australia, which primarily catered to the business sector. Connexus specialised in business-grade phone, mobile and NBN. Connexus was acquired by Pennytel in 2021; the "Connexus" brand is no longer used, and the old website redirects to the Pennytel website.

Connexus was part of the MNF Group, one of Asia-Pacific's technology companies.

== History ==
Connexus was founded by Greg Holloway in 1989 when he established a network of bulletin boards (BBS). BBS's were the original means of online communication prior to the modern-day internet. Connexus was one of Australia's first ISPs. Over the forthcoming years, Connexus expanded to four phone lines and the user base grew to over 1,000.

In 1998 Connexus established local facilities in Sydney, Brisbane, Adelaide, Perth and the Gold Coast (Service, 2012). In 2003, Connexus diversified its internet offering to supply business broadband for small to medium-sized businesses. In 2012, Connexus was acquired by MNF Group and relaunched in 2019 as a telecommunications provider targeted at small businesses.

== Timeline ==
- 1989 - Connexus was founded.
- 1994 - Connexus followed Australia's universities in connecting permanently to the worldwide internet. Users were then able to connect to the internet, initially using a Unix-based text interface, and later through the Netscape browser.
- 1997 - Connexus required more capacity, and relocated its data centre to the Exchange Building on Collins Street, Melbourne.
- 1998 - Connexus established local facilities in Sydney, Brisbane, Adelaide, Perth and the Gold Coast.
- 1999 - Connexus introduced Website Hosting and Domain Name Registration, and set up an exclusive access line and support area for businesses.
- 2001 - Connexus launched ADSL services, one of the first providers in Australia to do so. Download speeds up to 1.5 Mbit/s were supported initially.
- 2003 - Connexus introduced SDSL and SHDSL services, with throughput of up to 4 Mbit/s in both directions simultaneously.
- 2004 - CUp-to-date Cisco routers were installed. Australia-wide VPN (Virtual Private Network) services were introduced.
- 2005 - Connexus signed contracts with fibre optic providers, eventually offering speeds up to 1 Gbit/s.
- 2006 - Connexus launched its CSN—Connexus Schools Network—service, providing content filtering, reporting and e-mail hosting for schools. Connexus is one of four providers approved by the Department of Education of Victoria.
- 2007 - Connexus offered 21 Mbit/s ADSL2+ nationwide.
- 2008 - High-speed wireless offered.
- 2009 - Connexus introduced Ethernet products offering links up to 1 Gbit/s for larger organisations.
- 2011 - Connexus launches hybrid products which offer multi-line redundancy against link failure, and up to 40 Mbit/s speed in both directions.
- 2012 - On 31 December, the ASX-listed MNF Group completed its acquisition of Connexus.
- 2019 - Connexus relaunched as telecommunications provider for small and medium businesses, specialising in Virtual PBX phone systems.

== See also ==
- BAI Communications
