= Financial Review Fast Starters =

The Financial Review Fast Starters, formerly BRW Fast Starters - is a list compiled annually of Australia's 100 fastest growing startup businesses.

The BRW Fast Starters is one list in a series of lists published by the BRW. Other lists include:

- The BRW Rich lists, including the Rich 200, Executive Rich and Young Rich lists
- The BRW Fast lists, including the Fast 100, Fast Starter and Fast Franchises lists
- The BRW Top lists, including the Top 1,000 Companies, Top 500 Private Companies and Top 50 Entertainers lists

Companies listed in BRW Fast Starters list have several things in common, including:

- They have been operating for less than four years
- They have made a turnover of at least A$500,000 in the last fiscal year
- They have higher revenue than the year previous to this
- They have fewer than 200 full-time employees
- They must have more than one main customer

Businesses that make the Fast Starters list are ranked by their revenue and by their growth percentage within the last year. The BRW Fast Starters list is released annually during May in a special issue of BRW, published by Fairfax Media. Other lists produced by BRW magazine include BRW Rich 200 and Australia's Best Places to Work.

The Fast Starters list provides a summary of figures and lists the industries growing fastest, as well as other relevant statistical data. Companies can be listed, if they have been listed in previous years, depending on turnover and growth. The Fastest growing company in 2012 is HiLife Health & Beauty - the fifth fastest growing company in last year’s list.

== See also ==
- Financial Review Rich List
- Forbes Asia list of Australians by net worth
