= Port of Port Hedland =

Seaport in Western Australia

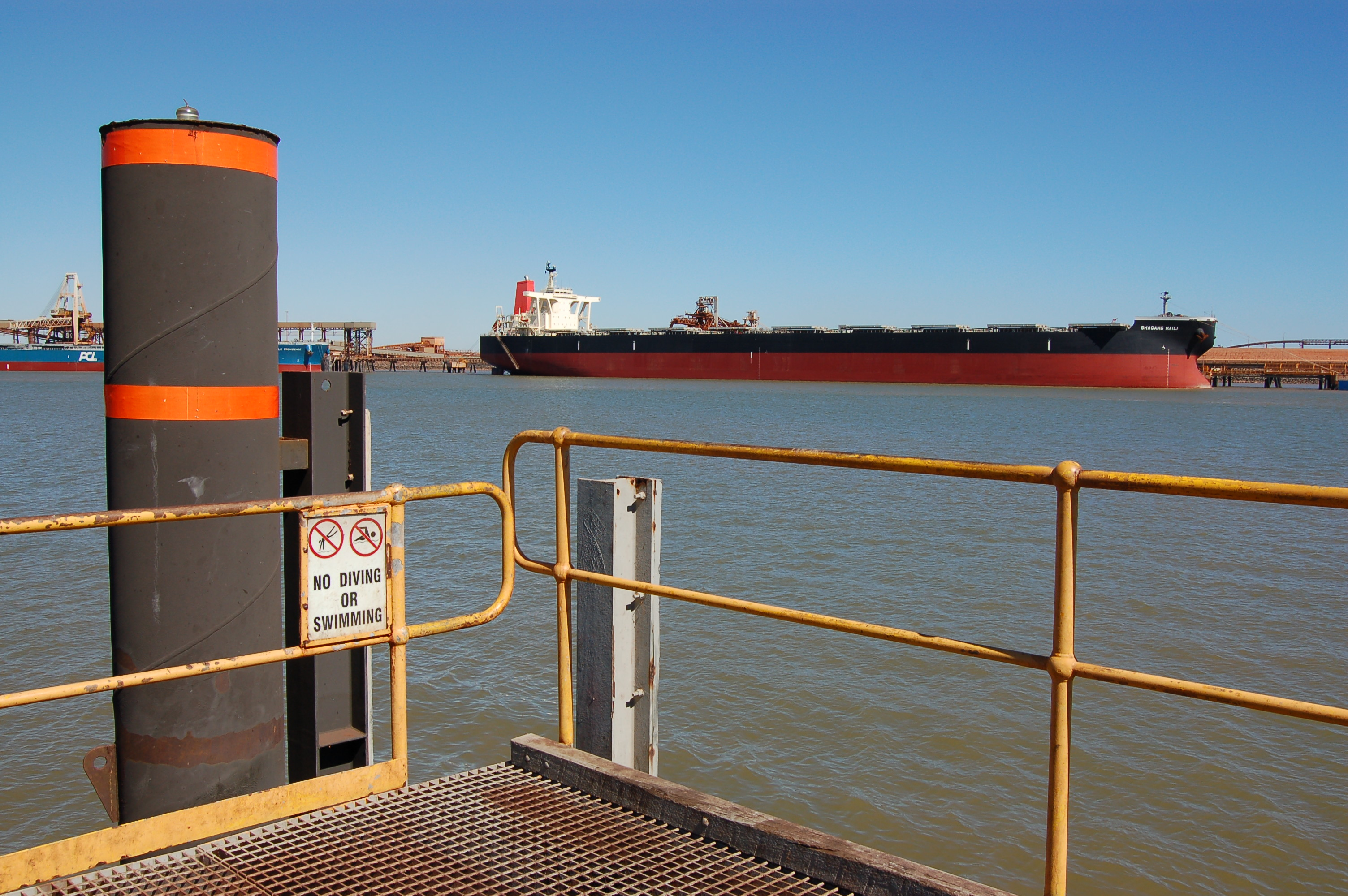
- View of the harbour at Port Hedland, looking west from the public jetty towards the bulk carrier Shagang Haili berthed at Finucane Island, April 2012
- Interactive map of Port of Port Hedland
- Location within Australia Location within Western Australia

Location
- Country: Australia
- Location: Port Hedland, Western Australia
- Coordinates: 20°19.0′S 118°34.5′E
- UN/LOCODE: AUPHE

Details
- Opened: 1896
- Operated by: Pilbara Ports Authority
- Type of Harbor: Seaport
- No. of berths: 19
- Draft depth: 19.8 m

Statistics
- Vessel arrivals: 3,281 (2021/22)
- Annual cargo tonnage: 561 million tonnes (2021/22)
- Website; Pilbara Ports Authority

Port Hedland is one of the largest iron ore loading ports in the world and the largest in Australia. In 2022, it had the largest bulk cargo throughput in Australia. With the neighbouring ports of Port Walcott and Dampier, Port Hedland is one of three major iron ore exporting ports in the Pilbara region of Western Australia.

== History ==
Named after Captain Hedland, the master of a ship that anchored there in 1863, Port Hedland was first developed in order to service the needs of the local pastoral industry in East Pilbara. The first jetty was built in 1896, this was extended in 1908 after the discovery of gold in the Marble Bar area.

Until the 1930s the port was predominantly used to import goods and stores for the local industries and to export pearl, shell, wool, livestock, gold, tin and copper. With the end of World War II, the port began exporting significant amounts of manganese.

The 1960s saw the development of the port by the iron ore and salt industries. Mount Goldsworthy Mining Associates, a company later absorbed by BHP, dredged an approach channel and turning basin for 65,000 DWT ships. Meanwhile, the Leslie Salt Company, from August 2001 Dampier Salt (part of Rio Tinto), built a land backed wharf and facilities to aid salt exports and fuel imports.

Further dredging was performed after the Mount Newman Mining Company, a subsidiary of BHP, chose Port Hedland as its export port. The new works allowed for ships up to 120,000 DWT.

Between the 1960s and today and extensive dredging and building has taken Port Hedland from a convenient anchorage to 15 berths capable of loading various ores and goods onto ships ranging from 25,000 DWT to 320,000 DWT.

From 1997 to 1999, the Port Hedland Harbour Tunnel was constructed under the Port of Port Hedland to convey iron ore fines to Finucane Island.

In 2005/06 Port Hedland became the first Australian port to export in excess of 100 million tonnes annually. In 2010/11 the port exported a record 199 million tonnes, making it the largest port by cargo tonnage in Australia.

In 2021/22, 561 million tonnes of cargo passed through the port. In 2023/24, over 7,000 bulk carrier vessels (about half of them iron ore) visit the ports in Pilbara.

== Port authority ==
Port Hedland's harbour is managed by the Pilbara Port Authority, a Government of Western Australia instrumentality. The port authority's headquarters, control tower and heliport are at Mangrove Point, just to the west of The Esplanade at the western end of Port Hedland.

The tugboat pen, customs office and public jetty are at nearby Laurentius Point. The harbour's wharves are located on both sides of the harbour – Finucane Island to the west and Port Hedland to the east.

== Geography ==
The points are key references to the port and its composition. Mangrove and Laurentius points are already mentioned, Utah Point, and Anderson Point are located in the inner part of the harbour and exist within the complex of current berths.

== Berths ==
Allocation of berths includes a commercial in confidence agreement between the PPA and BHP known as the Harriet Point agreement

- Finucane Island berths - BHP berths FIA, FIB, FIC & FID, PPA Wharf 4
- Anderson Point berths - Fortescue berths 1,2,3 and 4,5 (in South West Creek)
- South West Creek - Roy Hill Stanley Point SP 1 & SP 2
- Inner Harbour berths - PPA Wharves 1,2 & 3 and BHP berths Nelson Point NPA, NPB, NPC, NPD

== Gallery ==
Access by oceangoing vessels into and out of the harbour is via a narrow curved channel. The following series of images depicts a 225 m (246.1 yd) long bulk carrier, Darya Shanthi, using the channel to enter the harbour. Visible in the foreground of each image is part of the harbour's system of mangroves.

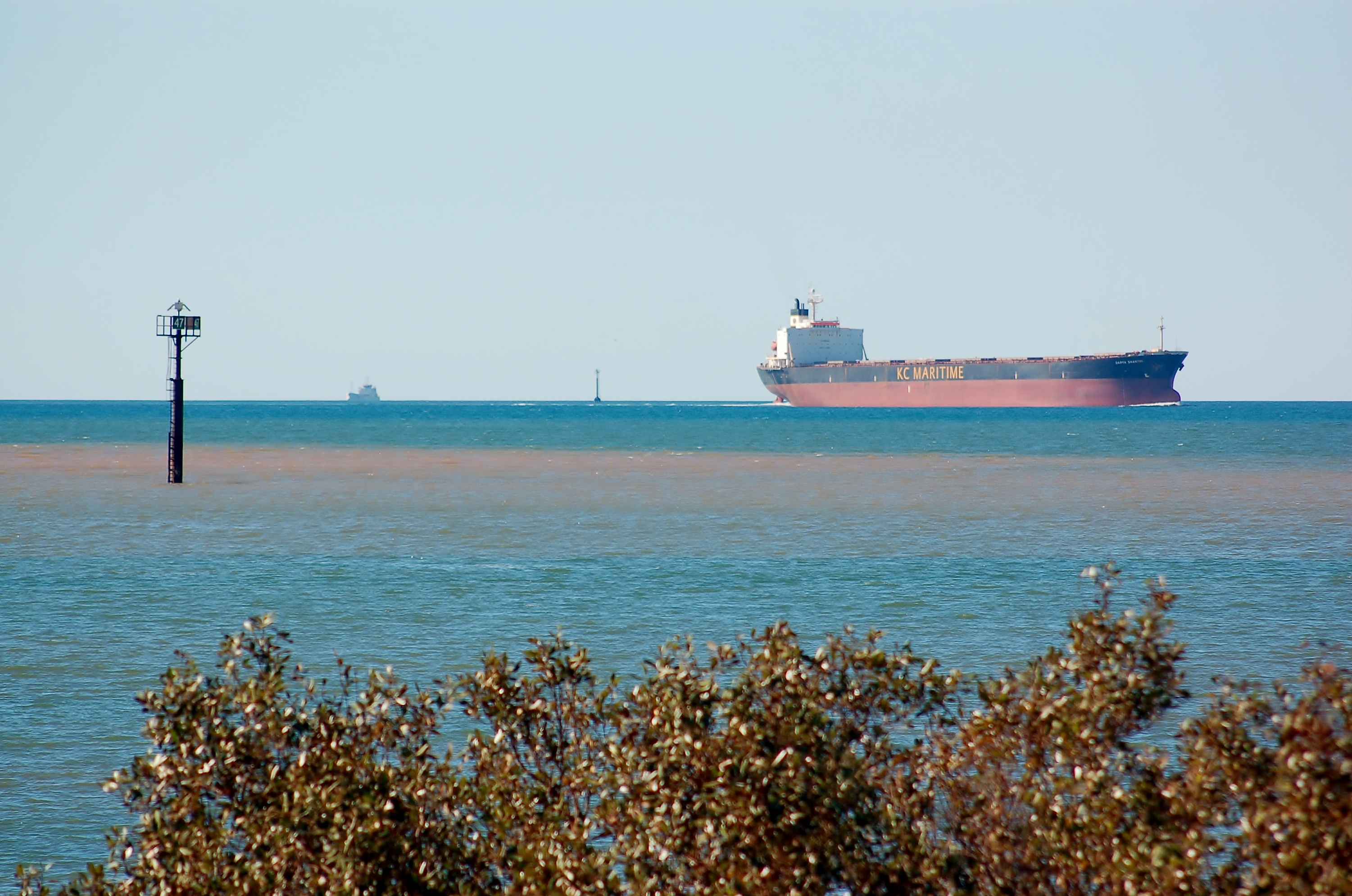

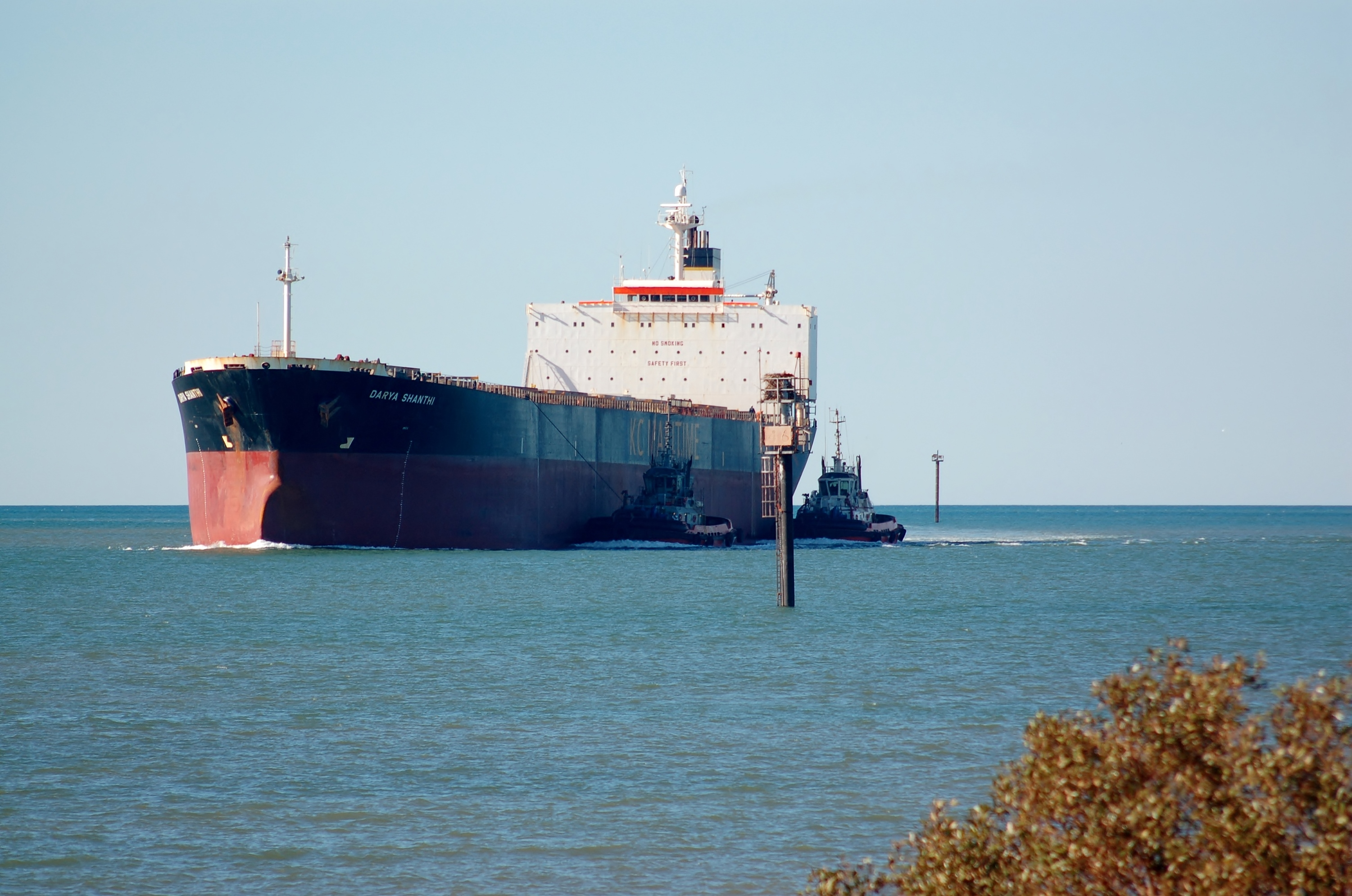

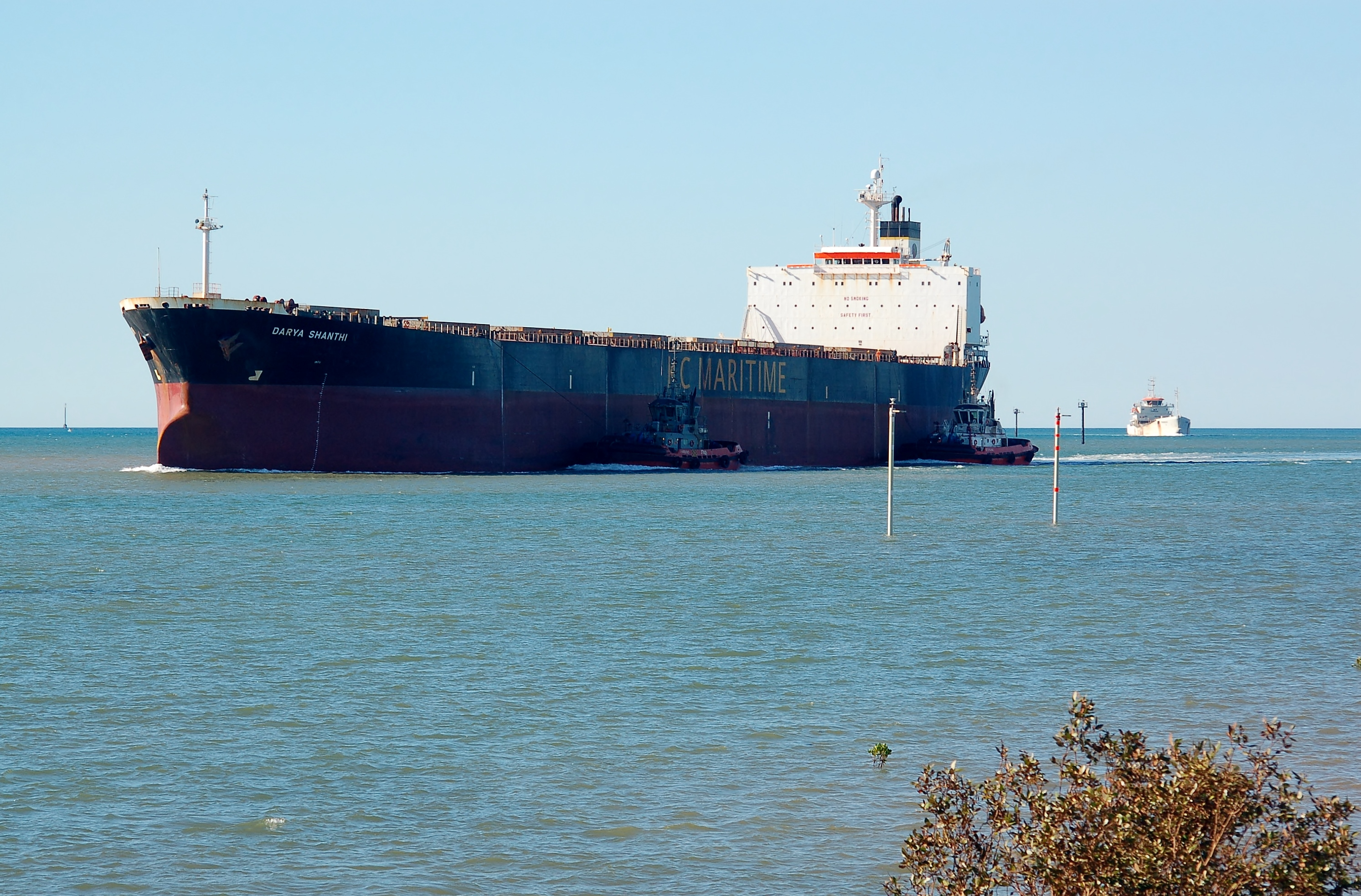

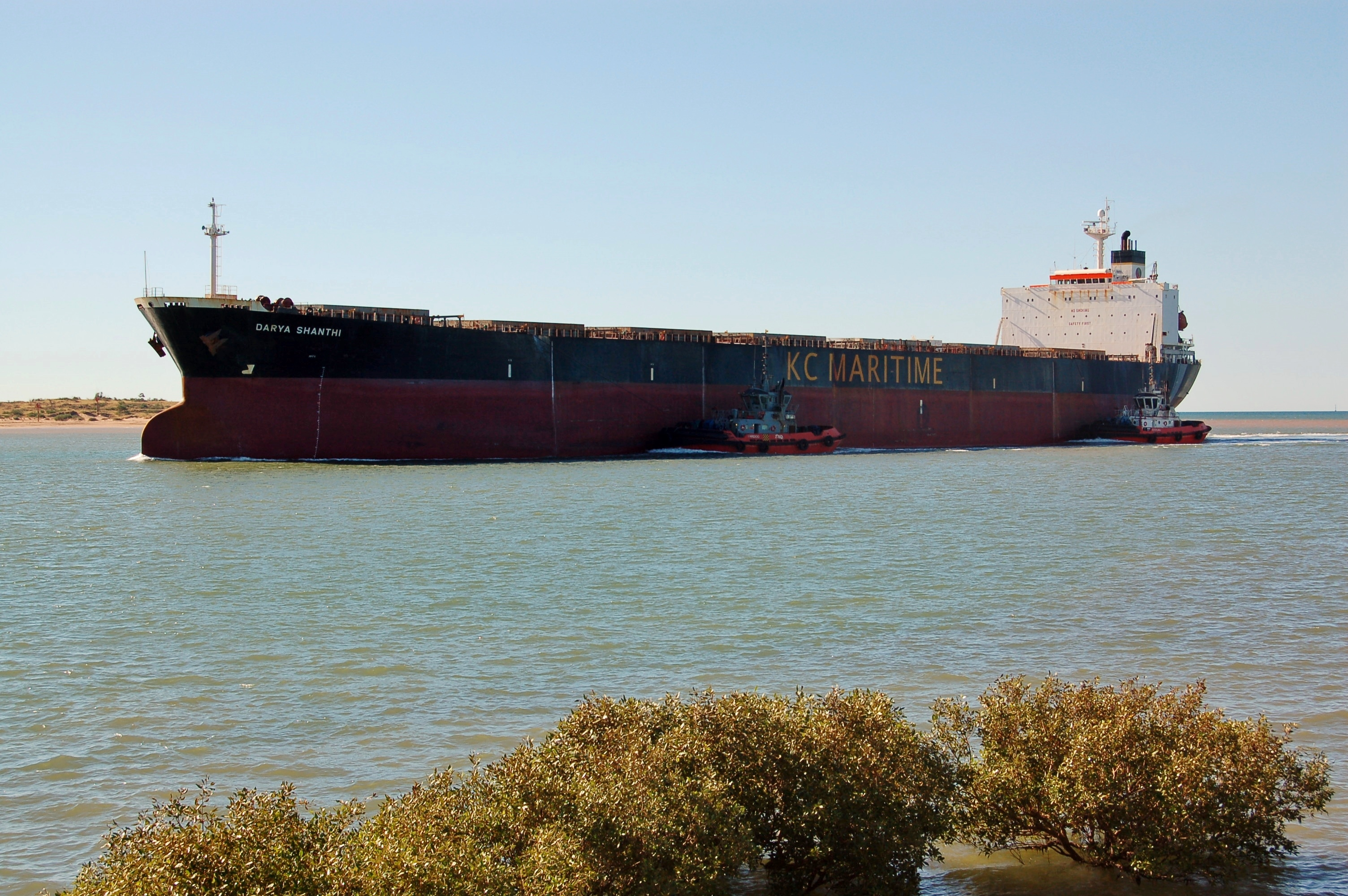

== Port statistics ==
Port Hedland ship and cargo statistics 2007-2012
	2012	2011	2010	2009	2008	2007
Total cargo (tonnes)	246,672,060	199,002,079	178,625,449	159,390,660	130,707,208	111,809,432
Imports
Sulphuric acid	10,003	6,011	–	73,577	69,649	145,336
Bitumen	–	–	–	3,185	1,284	3,825
Caustic soda	–	4,166	–	7,433	7,032	–
Ammonium nitrate	16,100	–	–	–	389	–
Cement	186,870	98,573	163,604	82,803	25,148	–
Fuel oils	1,216,044	988,990	822,794	713,226	619,957	527,256
General & containerised cargo	227,186	172,285	167,796	128,642	70,487	136,022
Total imports (tonnes)	1,656,203	1,270,025	1,154,194	1,008,866	793,946	812,439
Exports
Iron ore	238,932,735	192,548,683	173,957,507	153,895,882	125,267,292	106,616,567
Hot briquetted iron	–	–	–	–	–	–
Hot briquetted iron fines	–	–	44,576	324,389	321,702	–
Manganese	1,958,419	1,881,708	1,645,950	920,216	1,217,026	1,184,927
Chromite	411,647	173,236	143,421	180,128	209,792	219,337
Copper	433,904	461,383	479,545	423,050	417,075	249,824
Feldspar	–	–	–	–	–	–
Salt	3,197,203	2,623,412	1,165,401	2,609,954	2,409,527	2,669,441
Scrap	70,245	39,002	25,150	20,008	39,051	–
Livestock	–	–	7,817	5,825	7,951	6,335
General & containerised cargo	11,703	4,630	1,888	2,342	23,846	50,562
Total exports (tonnes)	245,015,856	197,732,054	177,471,255	158,381,794	129,913,262	110,996,993
Shipping
Gross registered tonnage	145,056,987	112,081,735	100,040,087	74,012,123	63,614,547	62,370,169
Deadweight tonnage	277,313,992	216,454,152	193,442,785	142,870,875	122,810,231	120,119,965
No. of vessels	1,843	1,474	1,303	1,027	888	925

In the 2025–26 season, Port Hedland handled 580 million tonnes of bulk materials, mostly iron ore.
