= Franco Belgiorno-Nettis =

Australian industrialist and patron of the arts

Franco Belgiorno-Nettis AC CBE
- Born: 20 June 1915; Cassano delle Murge, Italy
- Died: 8 July 2006 (aged 91); Porto Venere, Italy
- Occupation: Businessman
- Height: 1.57 m (5 ft 2 in)
- Partner: Amina Belgiorno-Nettis
- Children: 3

Franco Belgiorno-Nettis AC CBE (20 June 1915 – 8 July 2006) was an Australian industrialist and patron of the arts. He founded the construction and engineering company Transfield and also helped establish the Australian Biennale subsequently known as the Biennale of Sydney.

== Biography ==
Belgiorno-Nettis was born in Cassano delle Murge in the Province of Bari in Apulia, Italy in 1915 and attended the Turin Military Academy before joining the Italian army and serving in North Africa during World War II. He spent 3 years at an allied POW camp in India. After the war he returned to Italy to complete his studies in engineering at the University of Turin. In 1951 he came to Australia as the employee of Italian engineering firm Electric Power Transmission, (an offshoot of Milan-based Societa' Anonima Elettrificazione), which was constructing powerlines.

Franco Belgiorno-Nettis and Amina Cerino-Zegna wed by proxy in 1951 – Belgiorno-Nettis' brother represented him at the altar of Turin Cathedral for the marriage. Amina soon after joined her husband in Australia, and their three sons were born between 1953 and 1959.

In 1956 he and his professional partner, Carlo Salteri, set up Transfield which became the largest construction and engineering firm in the Southern Hemisphere.

He was also prominent as a patron of the arts. In 1961 he set up the Transfield Art Prize. He also helped to found the Biennale of Sydney in 1973.

Franco Belgiorno-Nettis died in 2006 aged 91, when he fell after suffering a stroke while attending to home maintenance in Italy.

== Recognition ==
- In 1976 he was appointed a Commander of the Order of the British Empire (CBE) for contributions to the arts.
- In 1985 he was appointed a Member of the Order of Australia (AM) for service to Secondary Industry and to the arts.
- In 1997 he was appointed a Companion of the Order of Australia (AC) in recognition of service to the arts, to Australian business through the engineering and construction industry and to the community.
- In 2001 he was awarded the Centenary Medal for service to Australian society in engineering and management.

His portrait was among the 2004 Archibald Prize finalists.
