= Xu Rongmao =

Chinese-Australian entrepreneur

Xu Rongmao GBM, GBS
- 许荣茂
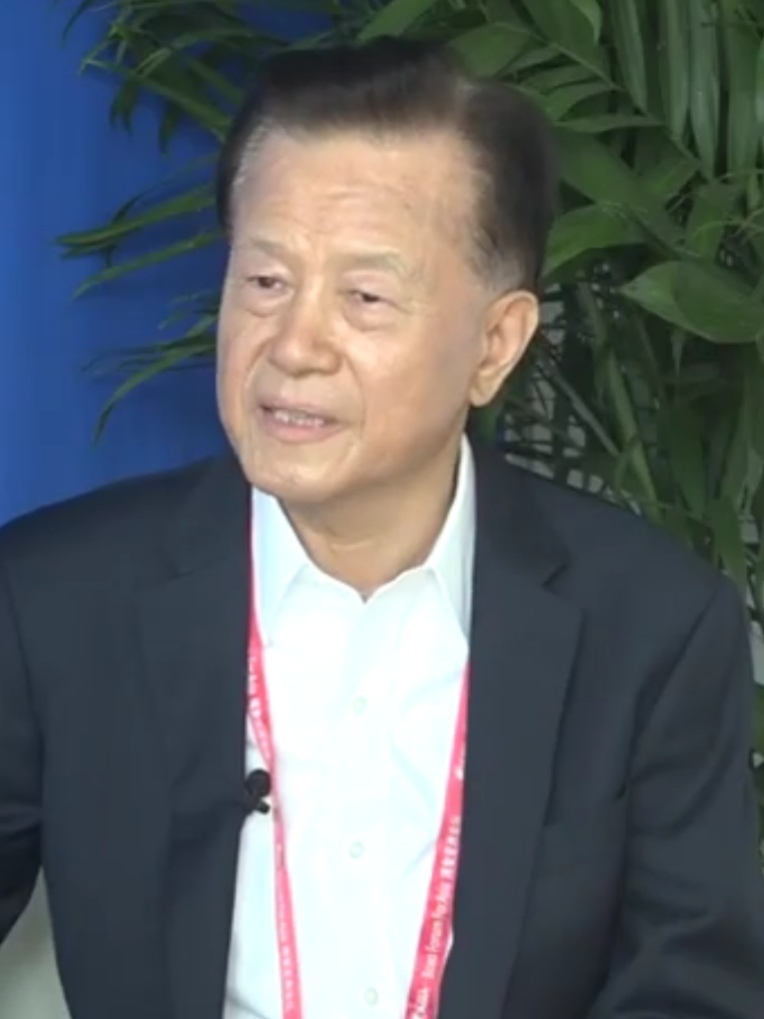
- Born: 1950 (age 75–76); Shishi, Fujian, China
- Citizenship: Australian
- Education: University of Adelaide
- Occupations: Founder & Chairman; property developer
- Organization: Shimao Property

Xu Rongmao GBM, GBS (simplified Chinese: 许荣茂; traditional Chinese: 許榮茂; born 1950), or Hui Wing Mau in Cantonese, is a Chinese-Australian entrepreneur and billionaire, and the founder and the chairman of Shimao Property. Xu is estimated to be one of the largest property developers in Shanghai.

== Career ==
In 1988, he claimed to invest US$0.19 million in a knitting factory in his hometown, but he intended to build a hotel instead, although investments in private hotels were forbidden at that time. However, as soon as the construction was completed, the government policy was changed to allow private owners to have their hotels. Then Xu became the owner of the first private three-star hotel in China. He then started to invest into developing residential complexes and resorts in Fujian.

In the 1990s, he expanded his real estate business into Beijing and Shanghai. He undertook several property ventures in Australia in the 1990s. In 2005, The New York Times reported he had moved his family to Darwin, Australia. He completed his Master of Business Administration via distance-learning from the University of Adelaide and invested in real estate in the early 1990s. In 2003-04, Xu was the largest individual donor to the NSW branch of the Australian Labor Party.

In the 2000s, he expanded his business by acquiring listed companies including Shimao Holdings (listed on the Shanghai Stock Exchange) and Shimao International (previously listed on the Hong Kong Stock Exchange), while the latter was privatized by him in 2007. Shimao Property was listed on the Hong Kong Stock Exchange in 2006.

== Personal life ==
In 2008, Xu was reported to be interested in buying Newcastle United F.C. from then owner Mike Ashley.

=== Net worth ===
Xu's net worth is compiled on the Financial Review Rich List, the Forbes China Rich List, and the Hurun Report China Rich List. According to Forbes, in 2021 his net worth was estimated at $10.3 billion. As of May 2025, Xu's net worth was assessed at A$3.89 billion on the Financial Review 2025 Rich List.

Year	Financial Review Rich List		Forbes China Rich List		Hurun Report China Rich List	
Year	Rank	Net worth (A$)	Rank	Net worth (US$)	Rank	Net worth (US$)
2011	n/a	not listed	29	$2.40 billion ▼		
2012	n/a	not listed	10 ▲	$4.00 billion ▼		
2013	7 ▲	$4.82 billion ▲	12 ▼		8 ▲	$6.90 billion ▲
2014	6 ▲	$6.35 billion ▲				
2015	5 ▲	$6.89 billion ▲	16 ▼	$5.40 billion	41 ▼	$5.43 billion ▼
2016	6 ▼	$5.39 billion ▼			21 ▲	$7.75 billion ▲
2017	8 ▼	$5.96 billion ▲	22 ▼	$7.22 billion ▲	33 ▼	$8.45 billion ▲
2018	4 ▲	$9.09 billion ▲			19 ▲	$13.18 billion ▲
2019	4	$10.39 billion ▲			20 ▼	$14.73 billion ▲
2020	4	$18.06 billion ▲	n/a	not listed	23 ▼	$19.10 billion ▲
2021	8 ▼	$11.70 billion ▼		$10.3 billion		
2022	22 ▼	$4.80 billion ▼				
2023	19 ▲	$4.90 billion ▲				
2024	40 ▼	$3.35 billion ▼				
2025	40	$3.89 billion ▲				

Legend
Icon	Description
Steady	Has not changed from the previous year
▲	Has increased from the previous year
▼	Has decreased from the previous year
