= Shimao Group =

Property development company in Shanghai

Shimao Group Holdings Ltd.
- Type: Public
- Industry: Real estate development
- Founded: 2001
- Headquarters: Cayman Islands (registered office); Hong Kong (headquarters); Mainland China (actual operations)
- Key people: Hui Wing Mau
- Services: Property Development, Property Investment, and Hotel Operations
- Website: www.shimaoproperty.com

Shimao Group Holdings Ltd. (SEHK: 813), formerly Shimao Property Holdings Ltd. (Chinese: 世茂集团控股有限公司), is a diversified real estate development company that specializes in property development, property investment, and hotel operations in the People's Republic of China. The group develops large-scale residential projects, hotels, and other commercial buildings in prime locations, and it is one of the largest property developers in the People's Republic of China. As of February 2013, Shimao Property Holdings Ltd. owned a bank of land totaling 36.2 million square meters, making it one of the top real estate developers in China in terms of land bank size.

In April 2024, China Construction Bank (Asia) filed a petition over Shimao's failure to repay loans of HK$1.58 billion (US$203.06 million). In January 2025, the company received another liquidation petition in Hong Kong high court regarding a 258 million yuan (US$35.19 million) cross-border loan.

The group's projects have been well received by property buyers and investors in China and internationally, and they have won several awards. The group is headquartered in Wan Chai, Hong Kong, and Shanghai.

== History ==
Shimao Property Holdings Ltd. was founded in 2001 by Chinese entrepreneur and billionaire, Hui Wing Mau. Hui Wing Mau's son Jason is the group's current Vice Chairman.

The company was listed on the Stock Exchange of Hong Kong (SEHK: 813) in 2006 with an IPO price of HK $6.25 per share and an initial public offering of HK $3.72 billion, or roughly $480 million.

In April 2022, Shimao was among stocks that were suspended from trading after missing the deadline to report annual results, due to the 2020–2022 Chinese property sector crisis.

In April 2024, China Construction Bank (Asia) filed a liquidation petition in Hong Kong over a financial obligation amounting to HK$1,579.5 million ($201.75 million).

== Residential properties ==
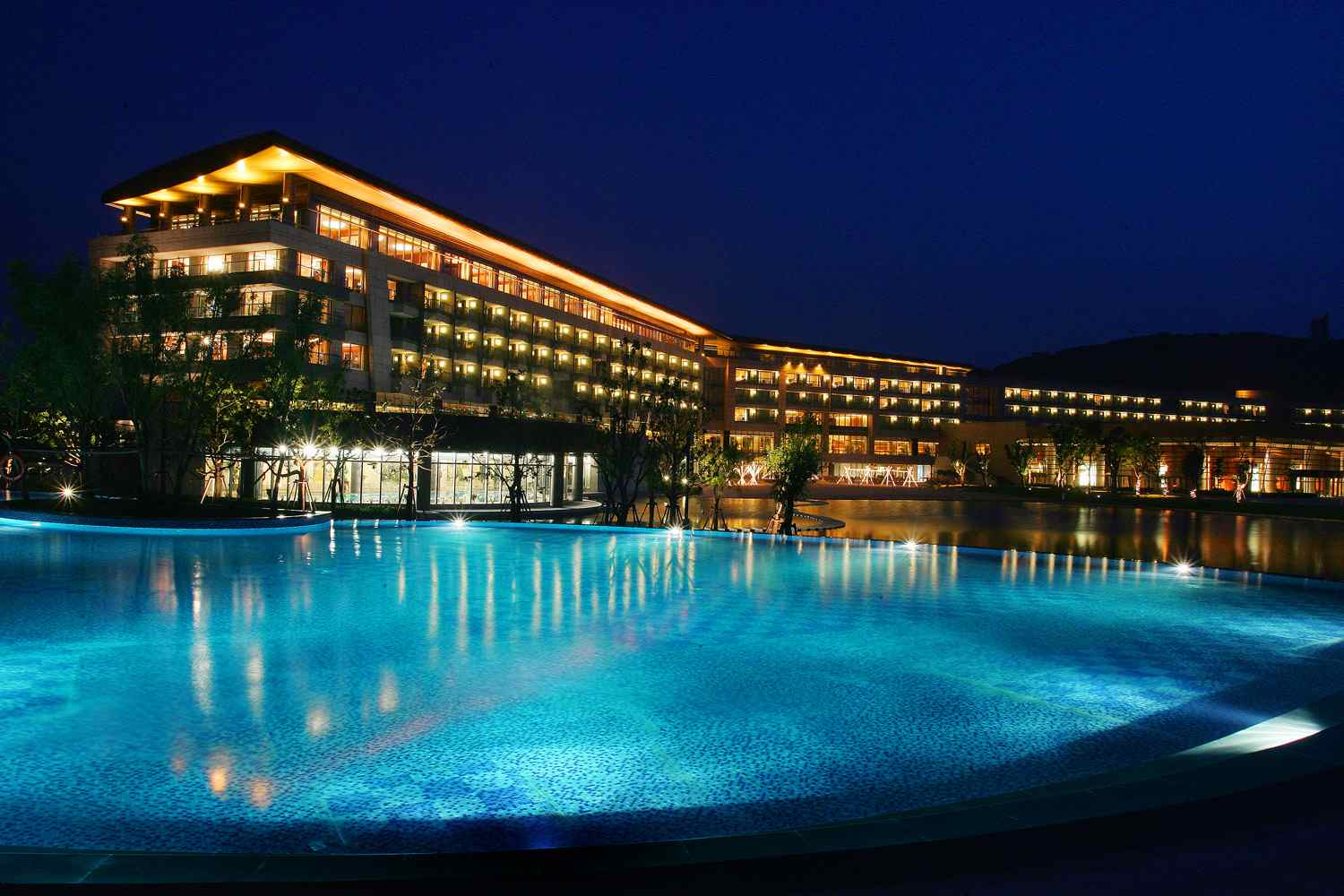
Meridien Sheshan

Shimao Property Holdings Ltd. has developed a range of residential properties in the Jiangsu and Shanghai Districts, including Shanghai, Nanjing, Suzhou, Kunshan, Hangzhou, Ningbo and Fujian province, including Xiamen, Jinjiang, and Fuzhou Minhou, which run along the eastern border of China.

The group completed 37 projects in 2012. Of those projects, 11 generated revenues of over ¥1.0 billion. Those projects were the Changshu Shimao Center, the Fuzhou Shimao Skyscrapers, Xiamen Shimao Lakeside Garden, Hangzhou Shimao Riviera Garden, Fuzhou Minhou Shimao Dragon Bay, Shanghai Shimao Riviera Garden, Nanjing Shimao Bund New City, Suzhou Shimao Canal Scene, Kunshan Shimao East No.1, and Kunshan Shimao International City.

== Hotel operations ==
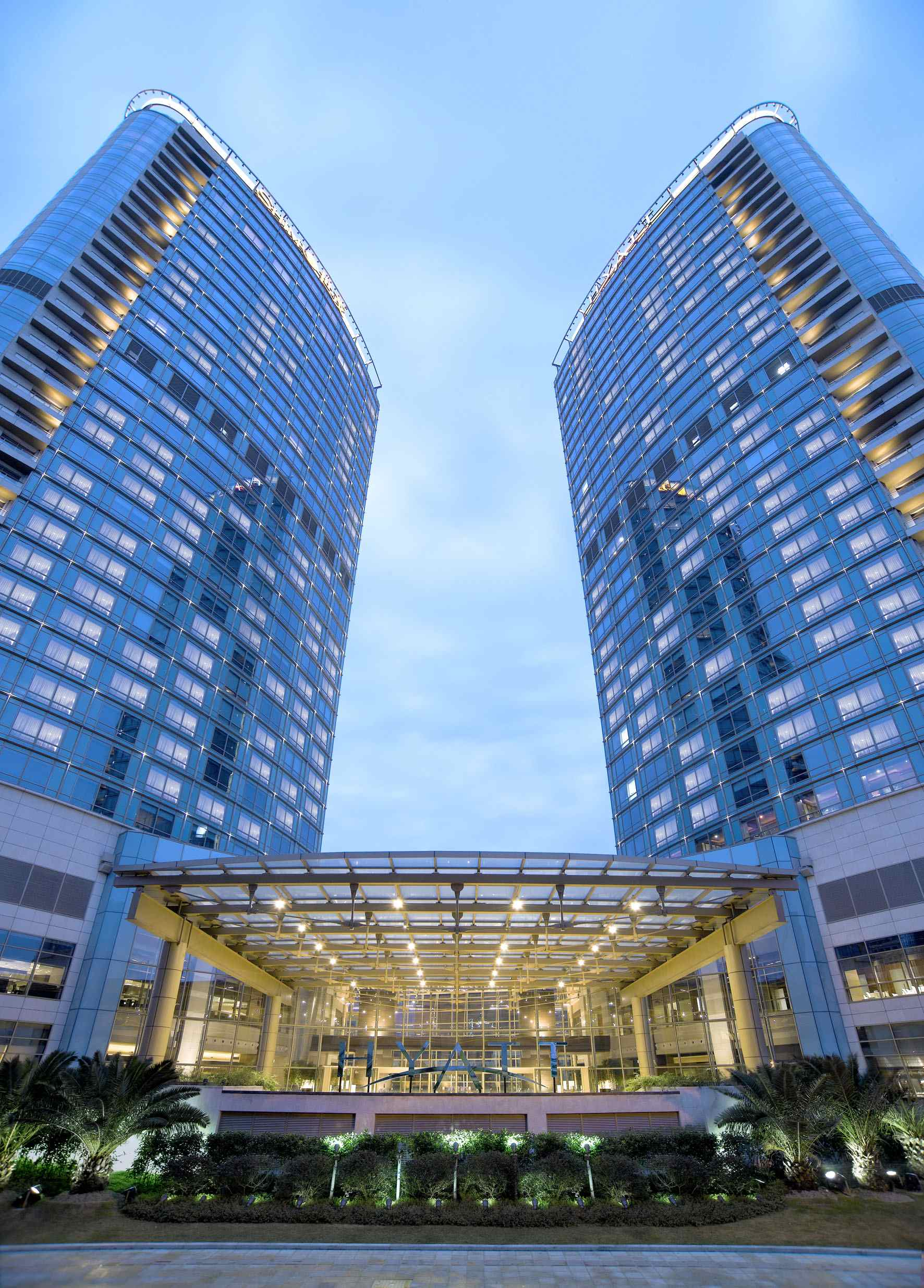
Hyatt on the Bund

Shimao Property Holdings Ltd. currently operates six hotels, which has a total of 2,679 guest rooms. These hotels are the Le Royal Méridien Shanghai, Hyatt on the Bund Shanghai, Le Méridien Sheshan Shanghai, Hilton Nanjiang Riverside, Mudanjiang Holiday Inn, and Shaoxing Shimao Holiday Inn. The Group's Le Royal Méridien Shanghai and Hyatt on the Bund Shanghai remained among the top hotels in Puxi in terms of revenue. The food and beverage revenue from Hyatt on the Bund Shanghai was the highest ranked among hotels in Puxi.

== Commercial buildings ==
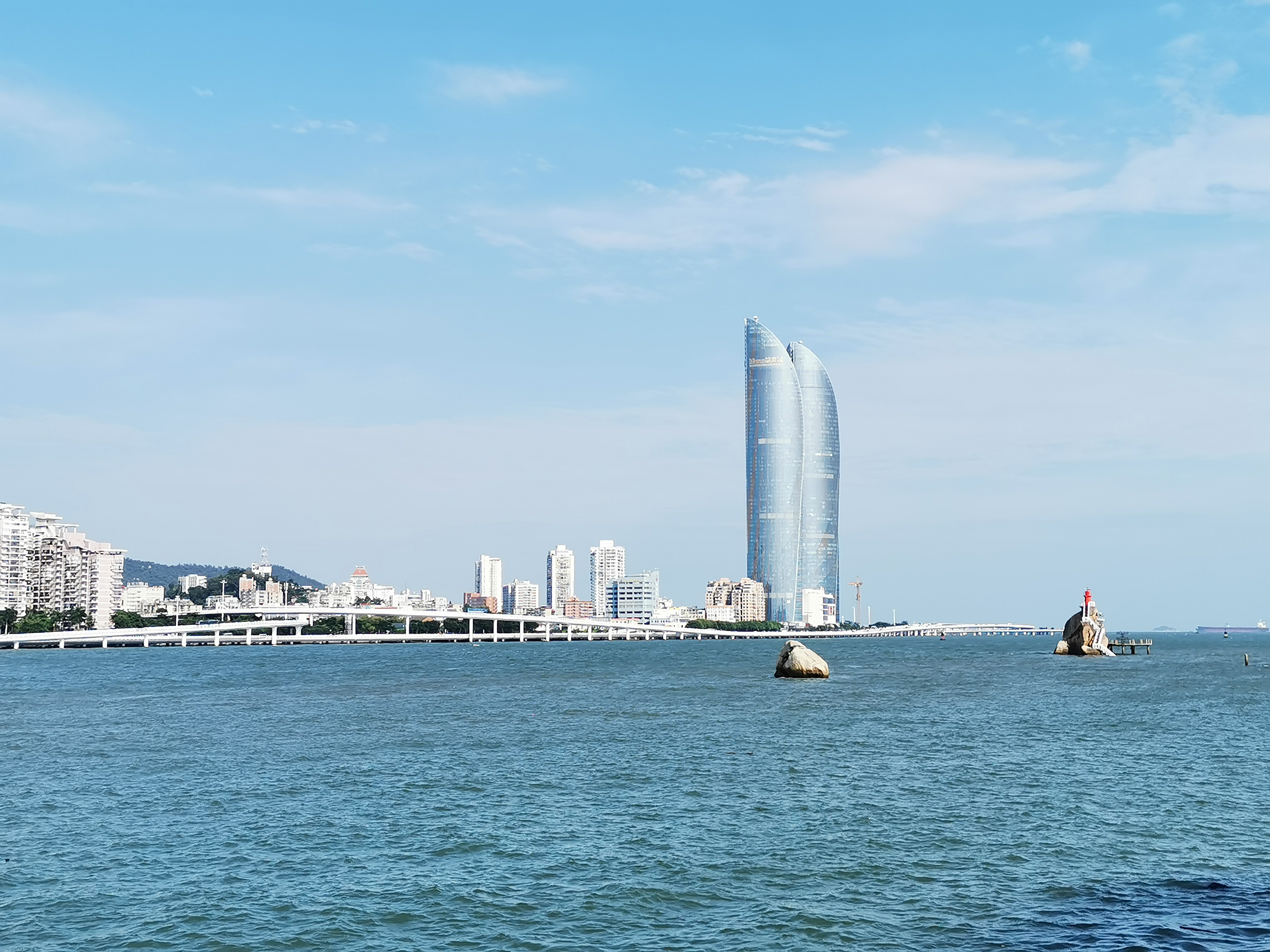
Xiamen MO Sky Mansion

The group develops commercial properties through its 64.22% owned subsidiary Shanghai Shimao Co., Ltd. Shanghai Shimao's plaza operations are based in prime locations including Shanghai, Shaoxing, Suzhou, Changshu, Kunshan and Xuzhou, and the company has a strong foothold in several core business districts.

While developing its department store operations, Shanghai Shimao followed market trends in Chinese cities such as Beijing, Yantai, and Fuzhou and introduced international brands that matched the local demand.

The company also developed several cinema properties in China, and currently owns 10 cinemas and 87 screens nationwide. Shimao cinemas carried out market research relating to cinema management, movie screenings, and non-box office sales which it then used to help generate growth. "Shimao International Cinema" holds the first full 3D IMAX cinema in Kunshan.
