= John Roberts (Australian businessman) =

Australian businessman

John Roberts AO
- Born: John Charles Roberts; 23 January 1934
- Died: 8 June 2006 (aged 72); Perth, Western Australia
- Occupations: Entrepreneur and company director
- Years active: 1962 – 2005
- Known for: Multiplex
- Spouse: Angela Egerton-Warburton (m. 1964; dissolved 1999)
- Children: Andrew Roberts; Tim Roberts; Denby Macgregor
- Awards: Officer of the Order of Australia (AO) (1988); Centenary Medal (2001)

John Charles Roberts AO (23 January 1934 - 8 June 2006) was an Australian businessman who was the founding chairman and an executive director of construction company Multiplex.

== Early life and career ==
On leaving school he worked in the construction industry in Broken Hill in New South Wales between 1951 and 1958. From 1959 to 1961 he worked on the Menindee irrigation system and the pumping station which brought water from the Darling River to Broken Hill.

== Multiplex ==
Roberts established Multiplex in 1962. He was Chief Executive between 1962 and 2003 and Chairman until 2005. As Perth boomed, Multiplex expanded nationally across Australia and then internationally.

Multiplex successfully bid for the A$1.2 billion project to rebuild Wembley Stadium. However, this project was plagued by cost overruns and missed deadlines leading to his resignation as Executive Chairman in 2005. In 2006, the BRW Rich List estimated his net worth at A$740 million, down from A$1.1 billion the previous year. A year after his death, the Roberts family sold out of Multiplex in 2007, with its controlling interest acquired by Brookfield Asset Management.

== Awards ==
In 1988, Roberts was appointed an Officer of the Order of Australia for service to the construction industry and to the sport of horse racing. Roberts was awarded the Centenary Medal in 2001.

Roberts was inducted into the Property Council of Australia Hall of Fame in August 2017; eleven years after he accepted the invitation, planned to be awarded in August 2006.

== Personal life ==
Roberts married Angela Egerton-Warburton in 1964 with the marriage being dissolved in 1999. His children are Andrew Roberts, Tim Roberts, and Denby Macgregor.

He was a keen supporter of horse racing serving as the Chairman of the Western Australian Turf Club between 1984 and 1987. He served on the committee between 1971 and 1987.

Roberts died at his home in Perth at the age of 72 after a long battle with diabetes.
