= Tenix =

Australian maintenance company

Tenix Group Pty Limited
- Type: Privately owned company
- Founded: 1997
- Founder: Carlo Salteri
- Headquarters: North Sydney, Australia
- Owner: Olbia (Salteri family)
- Website: www.tenix.com

Tenix is a privately owned Australian company involved in a range of infrastructure maintenance and engineering products and services to the utility, transport, mining and industrial sectors in Australia, New Zealand, the Pacific Islands, and the United States.

The antecedent company Transfield was established in 1956 by Carlo Salteri and Franco Belgiorno-Nettis. The company focused on engineering and infrastructure construction, and expanded into the naval shipbuilding industry in the 1980s (initially under the name AMECON, then Transfield Defence Systems). A 1995 dispute between the company's managing directors (the eldest sons of the two founders) led to Transfied being split in two; the Belgiorno-Nettis family kept the Transfield name and the construction side of the business, while the Salteri family retained the infrastructure, defence, and technology elements, which were relaunched in 1997 as several companies under the Tenix name.

Tenix Defence grew to become one of Australia's largest locally owned defence and technology contractor until 2008, when its defence assets were sold to BAE Systems Australia. On 20 October 2014 Downer EDI acquired the remaining assets of Tenix as the Salteri family auctioned the company to trade and private-equity buyers.

== History ==
Tenix's antecedent company Transfield was founded in 1956 by two Italian-born mechanical engineers, Carlo Salteri and Franco Belgiorno-Nettis. Together they built one of Australia's most successful companies focused on major engineering projects, such as bridges, tunnels, dams, hydro-electric and coal power stations, oil rigs, concert halls, sugar mills and power lines. Included in their list of major achievements are the construction of the Gateway Bridge in Brisbane and the Sydney Harbour Tunnel. By the early 1980s, Transfield had in excess of 3,000 employees and an annual turnover of A$350 million. Pope John Paul II toured the Transfield factory at Seven Hills in 1986.

Transfield acquired the Williamstown Dockyard in Melbourne through its acquisition of AMECON in August 1988 and, with it, the contract to complete construction of two Adelaide Class frigates for the Royal Australian Navy. In 1989 after winning a A$6 billion contract to build ten Anzac class frigates for the Australian and New Zealand governments, the largest defence company in Australia.

=== Growth of defence businesses ===
In 1989, Salteri and Belgiorno-Nettis stood down as joint managing directors in 1989 in favour of their eldest sons, Paul Salteri and Marco Belgiorno-Zegna. However, in a dispute between Salteri and Belgiorno-Nettis in 1995, the differences between the two families became irreconcilable and Transfield, then valued at A$733.2 million, was split in two. The Belgiorno-Nettis family kept the name Transfield and the construction side of the business, while the Salteri family got the company's North Sydney headquarters and the defence operations, which they renamed Tenix Defence Systems (later Tenix Defence) when Tenix was launched in November 1997. Tenix expanded with the acquisition of Hawker de Havilland (an aerostructures manufacturer) in 1998 and leading engineering and maintenance contractor Enetech in December 1999. Enetech was renamed Tenix Alliance in July 2001. In June 2000, Tenix finalised the purchase of Vision System's defence businesses, Vision Abell and LADS Corporation, which became part of Tenix Defence. Late in 2000, Tenix sold Hawker de Havilland to Boeing.

In 2002, Tenix bought out its partner, Lockheed Martin's, share in its LMT joint venture to form Tenix Solutions, its traffic and parking compliance business. In November 2005 the company was threatened with losing the contract for operating speed cameras in Victoria, when the Victorian Government had to withdraw fines due to incorrect calibration of equipment by Tenix Solutions employees. In August 2007, Tenix Solutions lost the A$150 million contract to operate Victoria's mobile speed cameras, but retained the contract for processing and managing the enforcement process. In September 2008 Tenix acquired a majority interest in Duncan Solutions, a parking compliance company with operations in the US and Australia.

From late 2004 Tenix pursued an acquisition strategy to extend the capabilities and geographic reach of its Tenix Alliance business. This included acquiring Powerco's field services businesses in New Zealand, Environmental Services International, and various power services companies in Western Australia. In October 2007 it extended into mechanical engineering services with the acquisition of Robt Stone in New Zealand. This was further extended with the acquisition of Western Australian-based SDR Australia in September 2010.

In January 2008, the Salteri family sold Tenix Defence to BAE Systems Australia for A$775 million. The sale required the approval of the Australian Government's Foreign Investment Review Board and Department of Defence. Despite the infrastructure arm of the group, Tenix Alliance, also being up for sale, the sale process was discontinued.

Tenix Aviation, formerly known as Rossair, a non-core business that offered a range of aircraft, propeller and component maintenance services to the aviation industry worldwide, was sold in December 2008 to TAE Australia. Tenix LADS Corporation, which undertook hydrographic projects for international oil and gas exploration companies and seismic survey organisations, was sold to Dutch multinational Fugro six months later.

=== Residual operations (2009-2014) ===
From 2009 to 2014 Tenix operated under the Tenix and Tenix Solution brands; and was also the majority shareholder of Duncan Solutions.

Its main areas of operations under the Tenix brand included infrastructure maintenance and engineering services to the power, gas, water, mining and minerals processing, oil and gas, and petrochemical industries in Australia, New Zealand and the South Pacific. Examples of recent contracts included the maintenance and construction of electricity networks (for SP AusNet and United energy), the design and construction of major electricity substations (for Ergon Energy in Queensland and ElectraNet in South Australia), the design and construction of wastewater treatment plants (for Water Corporation in Western Australia, for Unitywater and Whitsunday Regional Council in Queensland), the design and construction of water and wastewater network assets (for Logan City Council in Queensland and ACTEW Water in ACT), the operation of wastewater treatment plants, and the construction of mineral processing plants and associated assets (for Newcrest Mining in PNG and the Argyle Diamond Mine in Western Australia).

In July the Salteri family announced that they were prepared to auction to trade and private equity buyers part of the company or to sell shares via an initial public offering to reduce their stake in Tenix. In the end, the whole of Tenix was sold to Downer EDI for $300 million on 20 October 2014, where it has been absorbed within the Downer EDI brand.

Tenix was owned by the Salteri family through Olbia Pty Limited, the holding company for a number of investments including the company that operates the Sydney Harbour Tunnel, where it holds a 25% interest until the operating contract expires in August 2022.

=== Aftermath of sale ===
As of 2015 Tenix Solutions remains in the hands of the Salteri family, operating as a shareholder in Duncan Solutions. The company provides on-street, front-office and back-office compliance and infringement management services for local governments and institutions in Victoria, Queensland and New Zealand, as well as for the Victorian Government.

In 2017 Civica was awarded the Civic Compliance contract for the State Government of Victoria. Tenix therefore lost the Civic Compliance contract it had held since 2002.

== Philanthropy ==
Tenix supported the Sydney Symphony Orchestra's education program and Auckland Rescue Helicopter Trust.
