= BRW (magazine) =

Australian business magazine

BRW (formerly Business Review Weekly)
- Editor: James Thomson
- Categories: Business
- Frequency: weekly until 28 November 2013, then online only
- Total circulation: 34,000 (2013)
- Founded: 1981
- Final issue: 28 November 2013
- Company: Fairfax Media – Financial Review Group
- Country: Australia
- Based in: Melbourne
- Language: English
- Website: brw.com.au
- ISSN: 0727-7458

BRW (formerly Business Review Weekly) was an Australian business magazine published by the Fairfax Media group. The magazine was headquartered in Melbourne. It regularly compiled lists which rank corporations and individuals according to various criteria, similar to Fortune magazine in the United States. BRW provided news and commentary on the economy, business and investment in Australia. The magazine reported on successful business strategies, investments and entrepreneurialism. Cover stories and features concentrated on ways to make money and improve businesses. Each week BRW focused on a sector or topic relevant to business people or investors.

== Print edition axed ==
In October 2013, Fairfax announced that the print version of the magazine would be discontinued, with the 28 November 2013 magazine being the last edition.

== Online edition ==
From December 2013, BRW became an online-only publication and the paywall previously in place was removed. Some popular annual lists will also be published in Fairfax's The Australian Financial Review. On 4 March 2016, Fairfax announced the closure of the BRW website, with staff and the BRW website to be redirected to a new section of The Australian Financial Review. Rich lists, which would also be published by The AFR would continue to carry the BRW branding.

== BRW lists ==
Each year BRW named the 200 richest people in Australia and the magazine regularly published stories about how the wealthy made their money.

Other annual lists published by BRW included:

- Fast 100 list
- Young Rich list
- Top 50 Sports earners
- Top 50 Entertainers
- Executive Rich list
- Fast Franchises list
- Fast Starters list
- Australia's Best Places to Work
- Entrepreneur of the Year
- Private Business Awards
- The ''BRW/beaton'' Client Choice Awards
- The 30 Most Innovative Companies

== BRW Fast Club ==
In 2009, BRW launched the BRW Fast Club, which was developed to drive new business opportunities, forge partnerships and discuss current business issues for Australia's fastest growing businesses. The BRW Fast Club is a community of like-minded entrepreneurs that comprises members of the BRW Fast 100, BRW Fast Franchises and BRW Fast Starters lists from the past five years; members of the BRW Top 500 Private Companies List; and businesses who fit the criteria of the above and supply their company financials for verification. The BRW Fast Club meet throughout the year to network and discuss topics relating to cash flow management, strategic planning, business expansion, offshore expansion, finance (including managing capital and finding new sources), sales, how to sell your business, and IPOs.

== See also ==
- BRW Rich 200
- BRW Fast Starters
