= Ken Talbot =

Australian businessman (1950–2010)

- Born: 26 August 1950; Brisbane, Queensland, Australia
- Died: 19 June 2010 (aged 59); Djoum, Cameroon
- Education: Mitchelton State High School
- Occupation: Mining executive
- Years active: 1988–2010
- Organization: Talbot Group
- Board member of: Sundance Resources
- Website: www.talbotgroup.com.au

Ken Talbot (26 August 1950 – 19 June 2010) was an Australian mining executive, he was the principal shareholder and former CEO of the Macarthur Coal Ltd mining company. He was the only child of Norman and Nita Talbot (née McIntyre). Talbot temporarily stood down as the CEO of the Macarthur Group Companies when he became embroiled in a controversy involving loans to controversial Labor MP Gordon Nuttall, who was jailed for corruption in July 2009. At the time of his death, he was a shareholder in Western Australian mining company Sundance Resources.

On 19 January 2007, the Queensland Crime and Misconduct Commission charged Talbot with corruptly making payments totalling close to $360,000 to Nuttall. He was due to face court in Brisbane on 30 August 2010 on 35 charges relating to corruption.

== Death ==
On Saturday, 19 June 2010, Talbot was on a chartered flight between Yaoundé, Cameroon and Congo with his personal assistant, Natasha Flason as well as fellow Sundance Resources executives Geoff Wedlock, Don Lewis, John Carr-Gregg, John Jones and Craig Oliver, when the plane went missing. Rescuers found the wreckage of a missing plane carrying nine passengers and two crew, suspected to be Talbot's aircraft, in Congo on 21 June. There were no survivors.

Talbot's funeral was held on 14 July 2010. The corruption proceedings against Talbot were formally discharged on 12 August 2010.
