= Len Buckeridge =

Australian businessman

- Born: Leonard Walter Buckeridge; 15 June 1936
- Died: 11 March 2014 (aged 77); Mosman Park, Western Australia
- Education: Perth Modern School
- Alma mater: Perth Technical College
- Occupations: Architect; Property developer
- Years active: 1959–2014
- Organization: BGC
- Known for: Architecture, construction
- Spouse: Judith Lyon
- Partner(s): Siok Puay Koh (aka Tootsie Ambrose)
- Children: 6

Leonard Walter Buckeridge (15 June 1936 – 11 March 2014) was an Australian businessman known for founding BGC.

== Early life ==
Buckeridge attended Perth Modern School then trained as an architect at Perth Technical College. In his final year of studies Buckeridge won the James Hardie Prize for his thesis "The Economical House".

== Career ==
Buckeridge built high-rise buildings in Perth and elsewhere through his company, Buckeridge Group of Companies. He also owned James Point Pty Ltd.

In September 2012, Buckeridge sued a former fork-lift driver who allegedly posted defamatory comments on Facebook about him. The former employee was backed by United Voice.

In November 2012, he sued the Government of Western Australia for A$1 billion regarding a delay in construction on Cockburn Sound. Premier Colin Barnett counselled him to drop the lawsuit. Buckeridge also sued about a delay in the construction of the Perth Arena.

== Personal life ==
Buckeridge married Judith Lyon, and they had five children Lise, Rachel, Andrew, Sam, Joshua. His de facto partner for forty years was Siok Puay Koh, also known as Tootsie Ambrose, mother of Julian.

He lived in the Perth suburb of Mosman Park. Prior to his death, in January 2013, his net worth was estimated as US$1.4 billion. He died of a heart attack at his home on 11 March 2014, aged 77 years. In 2016, 22 family members initiated three separate proceedings in the Supreme Court of Western Australia to contest his A$2.5 billion estate. Under Buckeridge's 2008 will which vested in 2019, his empire was divided among 15 heirs — his six children, eight grandchildren and partner, Tootsie Ambrose.
