= Consolidated Media Holdings =

Australian media company

- Type: Public
- Traded as: ASX: CMJ
- Industry: Media
- Founded: 30 November 2007
- Defunct: 2 November 2012
- Fate: Acquired by News Corp Australia
- Headquarters: 54 Park Street, Sydney, Australia
- Key people: John Alexander (Executive Chairman)
- Revenue: $11.6 million (2012)
- Parent: Consolidated Press Holdings (50%); Seven Group Holdings (25%)
- Subsidiaries: Foxtel (25%); Fox Sports (50%)
- Website: www.cmh.com.au

Consolidated Media Holdings (CMH) was an Australian investment company focused on subscription television.

== History ==
Consolidated Media Holdings (CMH) was a publicly listed Australian company. Its two largest shareholders were Consolidated Press Holdings and the Seven Group Holdings.

CMH was formed following a name change by Publishing & Broadcasting Limited (PBL), and the PBL and Crown Schemes of Arrangement, in November 2007.

CMH had a 25 per cent interest in Foxtel. CMH's stake in Foxtel was held jointly with News Corp through the joint. The remaining 50% share of Foxtel was owned by Telstra.

CMH had a 50 per cent shareholding in Fox Sports, Speed, Fox Footy, Fox Sports News and Fuel TV), with the other 50 per cent held by News Corp.

CMH previously held a 50% interest in PBL Media, with assets including the Nine Network, NBN Television, Sky News Australia, Australian Consolidated Press, NineMSN, Carsales, Ticketek and the Sydney Super Dome. In September 2007 CMH sold down a further 25% of its interest in PBL Media to CVC Capital Partners. This was followed in December 2008 with CVC injecting over $300 million into PBL Media, which resulted in CMH's shareholding being diluted to less than 1% of the company.

== Investor history ==
The company was originally controlled by the Packer family. In July 2008 the Seven Network bought a $100 million stake in CMH, equal to 4.82% of the company.

On 16 December 2008, PBL Media issued a press release stating that the company's majority shareholder, CVC Asia Pacific, had refinanced debt facilities as well as injecting in excess of $300 million. CMH stated that they would not be investing any further funds, and as such, CMH's 25% interest became diluted to a stake less than 1%.

In July 2009, the Seven Network purchased a further 13% shareholding in CMH, bringing Seven's total shareholding to 18%. Within days CPH had increased its stake by 1.5% to 40%. On 15 July 2009 the Seven Network further increased its stake to 19.5%

In August 2009, CMH announced the sale of 54 Park Street, Sydney (the long time Packer family HQ) to AMP Capital Investors and the sale of all shareholdings in Seek to institutional investors.

News Corp submitted a bid for Consolidated Media Holdings in 2012. Seven Group Holdings also submitted a bid. The Australian Competition & Consumer Commission approved the takeover bid placed by News Corp, however, denied the bid placed by Seven Group Holdings.

The News Corporation takeover was approved by both the shareholders and the Federal Court, taking effect on 2 November 2012 and this ended the Packer family control of any large media company.

== Major shareholders ==
As at June 2012, CMH's major shareholders were Consolidated Press Holdings (50%) and Seven Group Holdings (25%).

== Assets ==
Consolidated Media Holdings had shares in the following companies:

- Foxtel (25%)
- Fox Sports (50%)
