= Carlo Salteri =

Australian businessman and mechanical engineer

Carlo Salteri AC
- Born: 23 October 1920; Milan, Italy
- Died: 12 October 2010 (aged 89); Sydney, Australia
- Education: Politecnico di Milano, Milan
- Known for: Co-founder of Transfield; Founder of Tenix
- Spouses: Renata Salteri (diss. 1981, dec'd 1991); Roslyn Cameron-Salteri (m. 1986)
- Children: Paul, Mary, Adriana and Robert

Carlo Salteri AC (23 October 1920 – 12 October 2010) was a prominent Australian businessman, mechanical engineer, founder of Tenix and co-founder of Transfield.

== Background and early years ==
The eldest child of Giuseppe and Flavia Salteri, Carlo Salteri was born on 23 October 1920 and raised in a well-heeled family in Milan, Italy. In 1940 he commenced an engineering degree at Politecnico before being called up by the Italian army a year later, where he served as a junior artillery officer. At the conclusion of World War II Salteri commenced work with Italian engineering company, Società Anonima Elettrificazione SpA (SAE), before the company was awarded a contract to build powerlines in Australia. Salteri was appointed in charge of the 25 workers travelling to Australia, together with Franco Belgiorno as his deputy. In 1951 Salteri migrated to Australia with his wife Renata and young family.

== Career ==
=== Transfield ===
After working in Australia for five years with SAE, in 1956 both Salteri and Belgiorno-Nettis (as he later became known) jointly decided to leave SAE and form Transfield, in a partnership that lasted 40 years. The company focused on major engineering projects, such as bridges, tunnels, dams, hydro-electric and coal power stations, oil rigs, concert halls, sugar mills and power lines. Included in their list of major achievements are the construction of the Gateway Bridge in Brisbane and the Sydney Harbour Tunnel. By the early 1980s, Transfield had in excess of 3,000 employees and an annual turnover of A$350 million; and within five years grew to the point of being the biggest engineering firm in south-east Asia. The company acquired the Williamstown Dockyard in Melbourne and, in 1989 after winning a A$6 billion contract to build ten Anzac-class frigates for the Australian and New Zealand governments, the largest defence company in Australia. When visiting Australia in 1986 Pope John Paul II toured the Transfield factory located at Seven Hills.

The pair stood down as joint managing directors in 1989 in favour of their eldest sons, Paul Salteri and Marco Belgiorno-Zegna. However, in a dispute between Salteri and Belgiorno-Nettis in 1995, the differences between the two families became irreconcilable and Transfield, then valued at A$733.2 million was split in two. The Belgiorno-Nettis family kept the name Transfield and the construction side of the business, while the Salteri family got the company's North Sydney headquarters and the defence operations, which they then renamed as Tenix.

=== Tenix ===
Tenix grew quickly on the back of the contracts to construct the Anzac-class frigates and completion of the Jindalee Operational Radar Network (JORN) project. The company expanded across the defence sector into engineering infrastructure and service businesses, such as gas, water, electricity, and the supply of speed cameras and traffic wardens. By the time that Salteri retired in 2007, Tenix had annual revenue of A$1.7 billion. Tenix sold its defence business to BAE Systems in June 2008, and its main business interests are in infrastructure and parking and traffic businesses across Australia, New Zealand, the Pacific and the US.

The name Tenix derives from tenacity, inspired by a comment made by Salteri's grandfather when Salteri was a young boy:

"...to make one million, one has to start from a 5 centime coin..."

Salteri reputably kept this coin from that day, until the day of his death.

== Personal ==
In 1999, Salteri was made a Grand Officer of the Order of Merit of the Italian Republic by the Italian government. In 2002, he was appointed a Companion (AC) of the Order of Australia for service as a leader in industrial and technological development in Australia, to the engineering, construction and manufacturing industries, and to the community through a range of artistic, cultural and health-related organisations.

Salteri established the Tenix Foundation to provide assistance for education, research and underprivileged children. Up until his death, Salteri was a patron of the Australian Indigenous Education Foundation and was a key supporter of education for Indigenous students.

Salteri died at the Mater Hospital in Sydney after a short illness on 10 October 2010, aged 89.

== See also ==
- Tenix
- Tenix Defence
- Transfield Services
