= Financial Review Rich List 2017 =

Annual list of wealthiest Australians

The Financial Review Rich List 2017 is the 34th annual survey of the wealthiest people resident in Australia, published by the Australian Financial Review on 25 May 2017. From its establishment in 1984 and up until the publication of the 2016 list, the survey had been published in either hardcopy and/or online format in the BRW, or formerly, the Business Review Weekly. On 4 March 2016, Fairfax Media announced the closure of the BRW website, and redirected the site to a new section of the Australian Financial Review. Rich lists are now published in The Australian Financial Review Magazine and in 2017 were rebranded as the Financial Review Rich List.

In the 2017 list, the net worth of the wealthiest individual, Anthony Pratt, was A$12.60 billion. The combined wealth of the 200 individuals was calculated as A$230 billion; compared with a combined wealth of A$6.4 billion in 1984 when the BRW Rich 200 commenced. Fifteen women and 185 men made the 2014 list.

== List of individuals ==
2017		Name	Citizenship	Source of wealth	2016	
Rank	Net worth A$ bn	Name	Citizenship	Source of wealth	Rank	Net worth A$ bn
1 ▲	12.60 ▲	Anthony Pratt	Australia	Visy; Pratt Industries	2 ▲	10.35 ▼
2 ▲	11.45 ▲	Harry Triguboff	Australia	Meriton	1 ▼	10.62 ▲
3 ▲	10.41 ▲	Gina Rinehart	Australia	Hancock Prospecting; investment	4 ▼	6.06 ▼
4 ▼	8.26	Frank Lowy	Australia	ex-Westfield; property (shopping centres)	3 ▼	8.26
5 ▲	6.85 ▲	Ivan Glasenberg	Australia; South Africa; Switzerland	Glencore commodities trading	9 ▼	3.33 ▼
6 ▲	6.84 ▲	Andrew Forrest	Australia	Fortescue	8 ▲	3.33 ▲
7 ▼	6.05 ▲	John Gandel	Australia	Property (shopping centres)	5 ▲	5.45 ▲
8 ▼	5.96 ▲	Hui Wing Mau	China; Australia	Shimao Property	6 ▼	5.39 ▼
9 ▼	4.79 ▼	James Packer	Australia	Crown Resorts; Consolidated Media Holdings	7	5.00 ▼
10 ▲	3.90 ▲	Stan Perron	Australia	Property	11 ▼	2.88 ▲
11	3.07 ▲	Len Ainsworth	Australia	Gaming; manufacturing		
12	3.00	Lang Walker	Australia	Walker Corporation (property)		
13	2.91 ▲	Lindsay Fox AC	Australia	Linfox; property	13 ▲	2.49 ▲
14	2.90 ▲	Kerry Stokes AC	Australia	Property; Seven West Media; resources		
15 ▲	2.74 ▼	Bianca Rinehart	Australia	Hancock Prospecting; investment		
16 ▼	2.55 ▲	David Hains and family	Australia	Investment	14 ▼	2.48 ▲
17 ▲	2.51 ▲	Mike Cannon-Brookes	Australia	Atlassian	18 ▲	2.00 ▲
18 ▲	2.51 ▲	Scott Farquhar	Australia	Atlassian	18 ▲	2.00 ▲
19	2.38 ▲	Solomon Lew	Australia	Premier Investments; retail		
20	2.38 ▲	Jack Cowin	Australia	Competitive Foods Australia; investment		
21	2.34 ▲	Gerry Harvey	Australia	Harvey Norman Holdings		
22	2.24	Marc Besen	Australia	Retail		
23	2.09 ▲	Alan Rydge	Australia	Rydges Hotels & Resorts; Event Cinemas		
24 ▲	1.98 ▲	Sir Michael Hintze	Australia; United Kingdom	Retail; investment	37 ▼	1.32 ▼
25	1.93	Huang Bingwen and family	Australia	Manufacturing		

Legend
Icon	Description
Steady	Has not changed from the previous year's list
▲	Has increased from the previous year's list
▼	Has decreased from the previous year's list

== See also ==
- Financial Review Rich List
- Forbes Asia list of Australians by net worth
