= Soleil (Brisbane) =

Luxury residential skyscraper located at 495 Adelaide Street, Brisbane, Queensland

Meriton Soleil
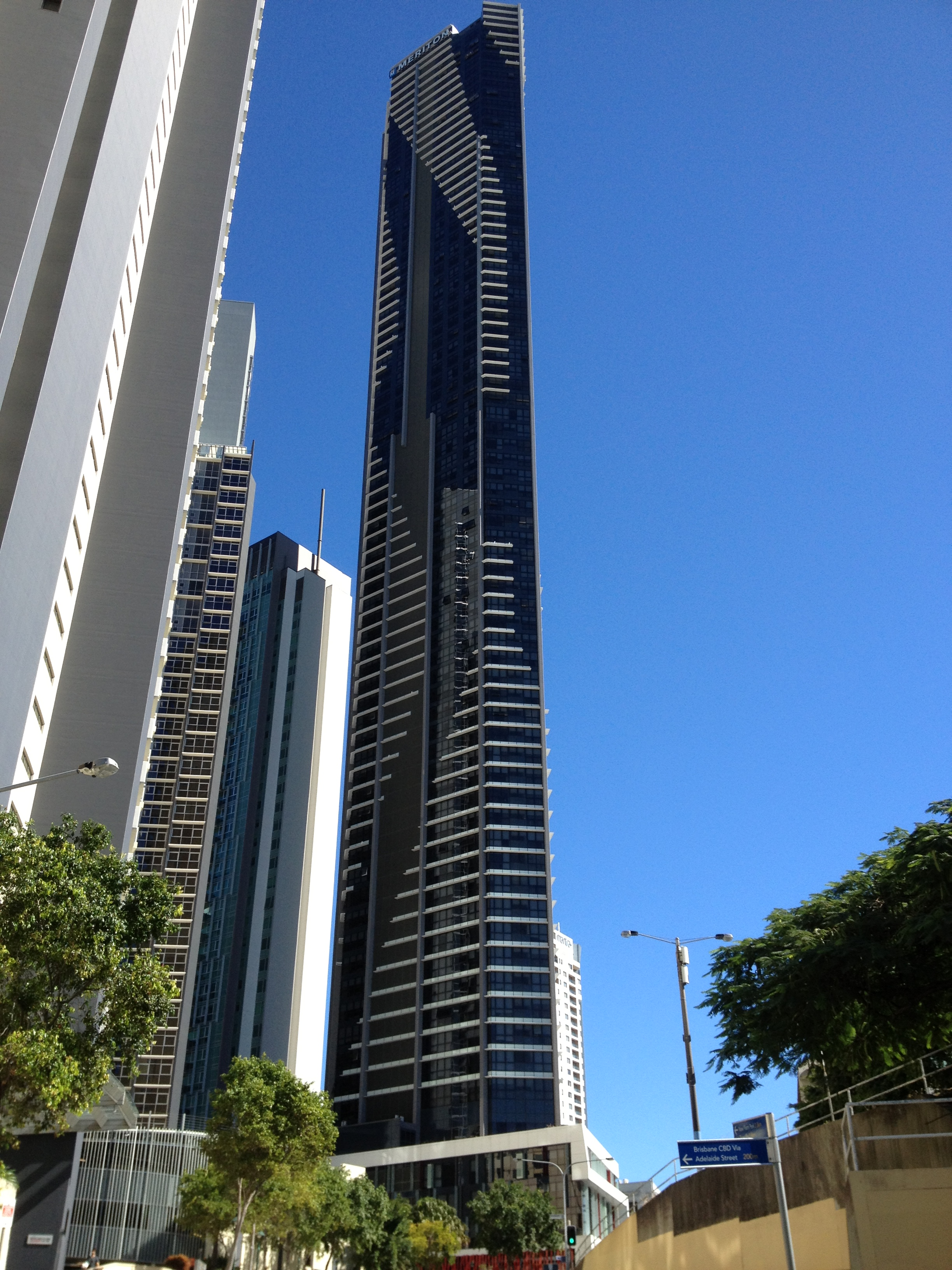

- Location within Queensland

General information
- Status: Completed
- Type: Residential
- Location: 495 Adelaide Street, Brisbane, Queensland
- Coordinates: 27°27′44.32″S 153°01′56.71″E
- Construction started: Early 2009
- Estimated completion: officially opened 20 November 2011
- Opening: Early 2012
- Cost: $900 million (AUD)

Height
- Roof: 251 m (823 ft)

Technical details
- Floor count: 74

Design and construction
- Architect: DBI Design
- Developer: Meriton
- Main contractor: Meriton

Soleil Meriton is a residential skyscraper located at 495 Adelaide Street, in Brisbane, Queensland, Queensland's capital city. Construction began in early 2009, with the building officially ready in 2011. At 251 metres (823 ft), it was Brisbane's tallest building until 2013 when Infinity Tower (262 metres (860 ft)) overtook it.

At 68 floors, Soleil contains 25 floors of serviced apartments and 43 floors of private residential apartments. In total there are 464 apartments. There is no penthouse in the building. The serviced apartments, which includes 50 apartments in the top nine levels, are owned by Meriton.

It is situated on a relatively small 1,500-square-metre (16,000 sq ft) corner site with rear access from Arch Lane. The slender building houses 10 levels of carpark which required one of the biggest excavations in Brisbane's history. Retail space for cafes and restaurants is provided across three levels.

The first building design for the site was rejected by the Brisbane City Council. This design was described as appalling and raised traffic congestion impacts. In late June 2008 a new design was submitted to the council and approved.

The building was officially opened by former Queensland Premier, Anna Bligh and Meriton boss, Harry Triguboff on 20 September 2011 but it was completed in early 2012. Starting at the first floor tenants began moving in as floors were completed.

== See also ==
- List of tallest buildings in Australia
