= Shorashim (disambiguation) =

Shorashim is a village in the Galilee.

Shorashim may also refer to:

- Shorashim (organization), a nonprofit organization devoted to building bridges between Jews in Israel and around the world.
- Roots – Judur – Shorashim, a non-profit peace organization of Palestinians and Israelis
- Shorashim, the fourteen criteria employed by Maimonides in Sefer Hamitzvot
- Shorashim, the principles of Jewish faith as enumerated by Albo in Sefer ha-Ikkarim

== See also ==
- Shoresh, a village in the Judean hills
- Semitic root
