= Efraim Halevy =

Israeli intelligence specialist

- אפרים הלוי
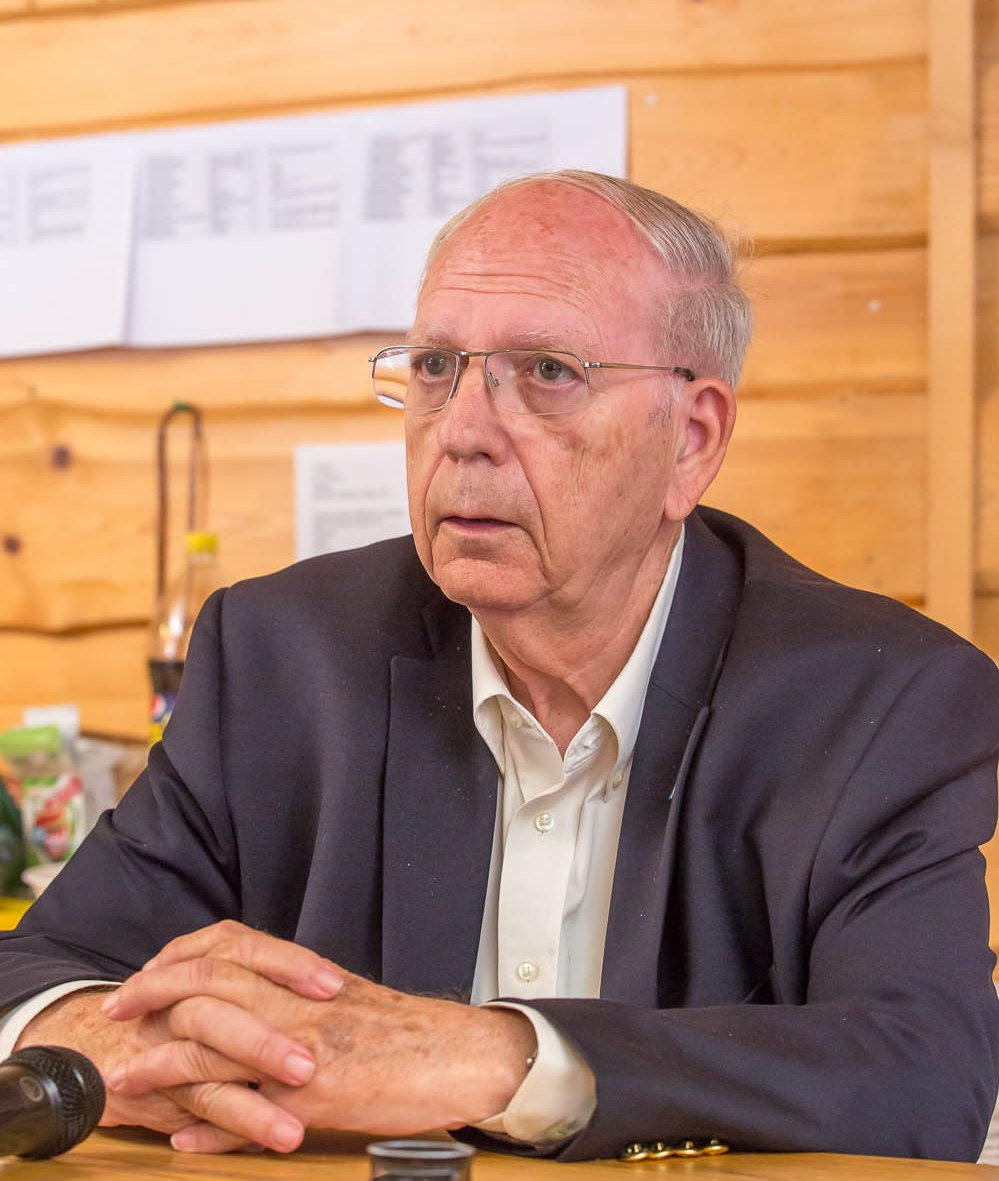
- Efraim Halevy in 2014

3rd National Security Advisor (Israel)
- In office September 2002 – August 2003
- Preceded by: Uzi Dayan
- Succeeded by: Israel Michaeli

9th Director of Mossad
- In office 1998–2002
- Preceded by: Danny Yatom
- Succeeded by: Meir Dagan

Personal details
- Born: 2 December 1934 (age 91) London, United Kingdom
- Education: Hebrew University of Jerusalem (Law)

Efraim Halevy (Hebrew: אפרים הלוי; born 2 December 1934) is an Israeli intelligence expert and diplomat. He was the 9th director of the Mossad and the 3rd head of the Israeli National Security Council.

He is known for his part in bringing about the Israel–Jordan peace treaty. The special relationship he developed with King Hussein of Jordan made it possible for Halevy to open Jordan to the awareness that only a peace agreement with Israel would extricate the Hashemite kingdom from the crisis after the Gulf War.

== Early life and education ==
Halevy was born in London, United Kingdom to an established Orthodox Jewish family on 2 December 1934. His uncle was Sir Isaiah Berlin. Halevy emigrated to Israel in 1948. He attended Ma'aleh, a religious high school in Jerusalem. He later graduated with commendation in law from the Hebrew University of Jerusalem.

== Government career ==
Between 1957 and 1961 he was the editor of the journal Monthly Survey (סקירה חודשית), published by the Chief Education Officer. In 1961, he began his work in the Mossad. In 1967, he was selected to the Chief Branches Forum.

Halevy remained in the Mossad for the next 28 years, heading three different branches throughout. Halevy had a working relationship with Hussein of Jordan which developed into a close personal friendship. Hussein trusted Halevy both with sensitive Jordanian internal issues and clandestine contact to act as a back channel with Israel whenever relations reached an impasse. As a result of his warm relations with Hussein, Halevy, along with Yitzhak Rabin, is credited with being a major force in movement towards the Israel–Jordan peace treaty

Between 1990 and 1995, under the directorship of Shabtai Shavit, he served as deputy director and as head of the headquarters branch. In 1996, he became the Israeli ambassador to the European Union in Brussels.

In March 1998, he became the director of Mossad following the resignation of Danny Yatom. He asked Aliza Magen-Halevy, the sitting deputy director, to stay on. Halevy served as the envoy and confidant of five Prime Ministers: Yitzhak Shamir, Yitzhak Rabin, Benjamin Netanyahu, Ehud Barak and Ariel Sharon. He took an active part in a special mission by Rabin in forging the Israel–Jordan Treaty of Peace.

After the failure of the Mossad operation to assassinate Hamas leader Khaled Mashal in 1997, he took an active part in Benjamin Netanyahu's mission to return the Mossad men captured in Jordan, and to settle the crisis with the King Hussein of Jordan. The King himself had specifically requested that Halevy not be involved because the former did not want the sordid affair to tarnish his personal relationship with Halevy, but ultimately Halevy responded to Netanyahu's pleas and traveled to Amman to break the deadlock.

In October 2002, he was appointed the second head of the National Security Council and an advisor to Prime Minister Ariel Sharon. In August 2003, he resigned from this position after Dov Weissglass, the bureau chief of Prime Minister Ariel Sharon, got too much power and he believed the Roadmap for peace was not favourable for Israel, and Prime Minister Sharon refrained from accepting his recommendations on a host of issues, and went to teach at Hebrew University of Jerusalem. He is the author of the book The role of the intelligence community in the age of strategic alternatives for Israel.

== Political views and activities ==
Halevy is known as a hard-headed pragmatist on issues involving the Israeli-Palestinian conflict, willing to ruffle feathers on the right and the left, unlike many others in the intelligence establishment who are known to take more extreme ideological positions on these issues. He believes that Israel should take up Hamas's offer of a long-term truce and try negotiating, because the Islamic movement is respected by Palestinians and generally keeps its word, he said. He pointed to the cease-fire in attacks on Israel that Hamas declared two years ago and has largely honoured. "They're not very pleasant people, but they are very, very credible," Halevy said. He believes in an aggressive approach, but at the same time in recognising the moderate leaders of Hamas as a partner in the Palestinian government.

In 2006 he published the book Man in the Shadows, covering Middle Eastern history since the late 1980s. Halevy was interviewed about his book on The Daily Show with Jon Stewart on 24 April 2006, and by guest host Brian Ross on the Charlie Rose Show.

In a January 2007 interview with the Portuguese newspaper Expresso, he stated that the world is "in the midst of a Third World War" with radical Islam, and predicted that it will take at least 25 years for the West to win.

In November 2011 Halevy said Iran should be prevented from becoming a nuclear power but expressed opposition to an attack which he said "could affect not only Israel, but the entire region for 100 years." He added "The growing haredi radicalization poses a bigger risk than Ahmadinejad". In 2015 he was one of the few public figures in Israel to support the Iran nuclear deal.

Halevy has written extensively on Israel's relationship with the United States, generally taking a moderate, pragmatic view of the Washington-Jerusalem alliance. He wrote, for example: "Never, but NEVER surprise the president of the United States is a dictum I learned very quickly when entering the Mossad in 1961."

For 23 October 2012, during the United States presidential campaign between Barack Obama and Mitt Romney, Halevy published an op-ed piece "Who Threw Israel Under the Bus?" in The New York Times countering Mitt Romney's assertions about Obama's stance toward Israel. In it Halevy cited several key instances over the years in which the "Republican White House acted in a cold and determined manner, with no regard for Israel's national pride, strategic interests or sensitivities" but that "no Democratic president has ever strong-armed Israel on any key national security issue." He concluded: "That's food for thought in October 2012."

In 2013, Halevy became chairman of the Shorashim program, a program that helps immigrants to Israel from the former Soviet Union verify their Jewish ancestry.

In December 2014 Halevy was interviewed by The Times of Israel. He claimed that Israel would never have peace unless Palestinians were treated with dignity as equals. He was critical of Benjamin Netanyahu and Naftali Bennett and their policies, especially regarding Jerusalem. He underscored the importance of the upcoming 17 March 2015 elections, which from his perspective "constitute an unprecedented opportunity to determine Israel's policy vis-à-vis the peace process."

Halevy is also an Advisory Editor at the British journal Fathom: For a deeper understanding of Israel and the region. In 2023, Halevy advocated for a rapprochement with Iran followings news of Iran and Saudi Arabia re-establishing diplomatic relations.

During 2005-2012 he was chairman of the Intelligence Heritage Center.

== See also ==
- Modern boundaries of the Arab world
