= Intelligence and Terrorism Information Center =

Israeli-based research group

- Formation: 2002; 24 years ago
- Founded at: Israel
- Purpose: Research on intelligence and terrorism
- Official language: Hebrew, English
- Head: Reuven Erlich

The Intelligence and Terrorism Information Center (ITIC), also known as the Meir Amit Intelligence and Terrorism Information Center in honor of Meir Amit, is an Israel-based research group. ITIC has close ties to the Israel Defense Forces. Its reports on the Israeli–Palestinian conflict and Israeli-Lebanese conflict have received media attention.

== Organization ==
The Intelligence and Terrorism Information Center was founded in 2001 as part of the Center for Special Studies, when the Israel Defense Forces wanted to analyze and publicize hundreds of Palestinian documents captured during Operation Defensive Shield. According to the Jerusalem Post, some of the documents directly implicated Yasser Arafat in terrorism.

ITIC's head, retired Israel Defense Forces Reuven Erlich, cited ITIC's advantage as its workforce with experience in the Israeli intelligence community, including counterterrorism experts.

The organization has had close ties with Israel's defense establishment and maintained an office at the Israeli Defense Ministry as of 2006. As of 2006, ITIC received some funding from the Israeli government, and in 2009 was receiving support from the American Jewish Congress. The institute's reports are mostly derived from open sources, but it is also well-networked with the Israeli intelligence community. The head of ITIC, IDF colonel Reuven Ehrlich, denied in 2018 that ITIC was a "public relations shop" for the Israeli military, but acknowledged that their reports "often happen to turn out to be very good material for public relations for Israel".

Several former members of the Israeli intelligence community (Mossad, Military Intelligence, the Shin Bet, and Nativ) have criticized the "symbiotic" relationship between the center and Israeli military intelligence and the center's establishment, arguing that the connection of military intelligence with a propaganda body would be detrimental to "objective" and "ideologically unbiased" analysis.

== Activities ==
During the 2006 Lebanon War, ITIC prepared a 300-page report for the American Jewish Congress containing a dossier of video and testimony accusing Hezbollah of using civilians as human shields during the conflict. The report was prepared by a team led by Reuven Ehrlich, a military intelligence expert according to the Associated Press.

During the 2008-2009 Gaza War, ITIC published a report about the use of human shields by Hamas. According to the report, Hamas methodically built its military infrastructure in the heart of population centers. The report included photographs of Hamas militants manufacturing and storing weapons inside houses and of Israeli soldiers finding weapons hidden in a mosque in northern Gaza during Operation Hot Winter in 2008. ITIC contends that Hamas not only hid among the population, but made a main component of its combat strategy "channeling" the Israeli military into the most densely populated areas to fight.

The institute reported in 2010 that the United Kingdom had become a strategically important hub for Hamas, especially for online and TV media. In response, Member of Parliament Louise Ellman noted that she had previously raised concerns to the UK Home Secretary. Then Minister of State for Security David Hanson said that the UK government was assessing whether to include the website on a list of sites to be blocked from school and college networks.

In 2011, McGill University professor Rex Brynen stated that the ITIC published a report praising UNRWA summer camps for teaching Palestinian children the values of "peace and coexistence", but later backtracked on that claim due to political pressure.

The Jerusalem Post covered an ITIC report that said top Iranian and Hamas officials had met at least four times in 2023 ahead of the 2023 Hamas attack on Israel. The report identified Hezbollah as Iran's "preferred strategic arm".

ITIC has criticized the verification methods of the left-wing human rights group B'Tselem for Gaza casualty numbers during conflicts, such as Operation Protective Edge.

The center's research staff, some of whom are former Military Intelligence officers, compile weekly reports that are published online at their website.

An ITIC report on Operation Cast Lead was found among training materials for US law enforcement in BlueLeaks files along with presentation documents from the IDF Strategic Division and The Dado Center.
