= Infinity Tower (Brisbane) =

Skyscraper in Brisbane, Australia

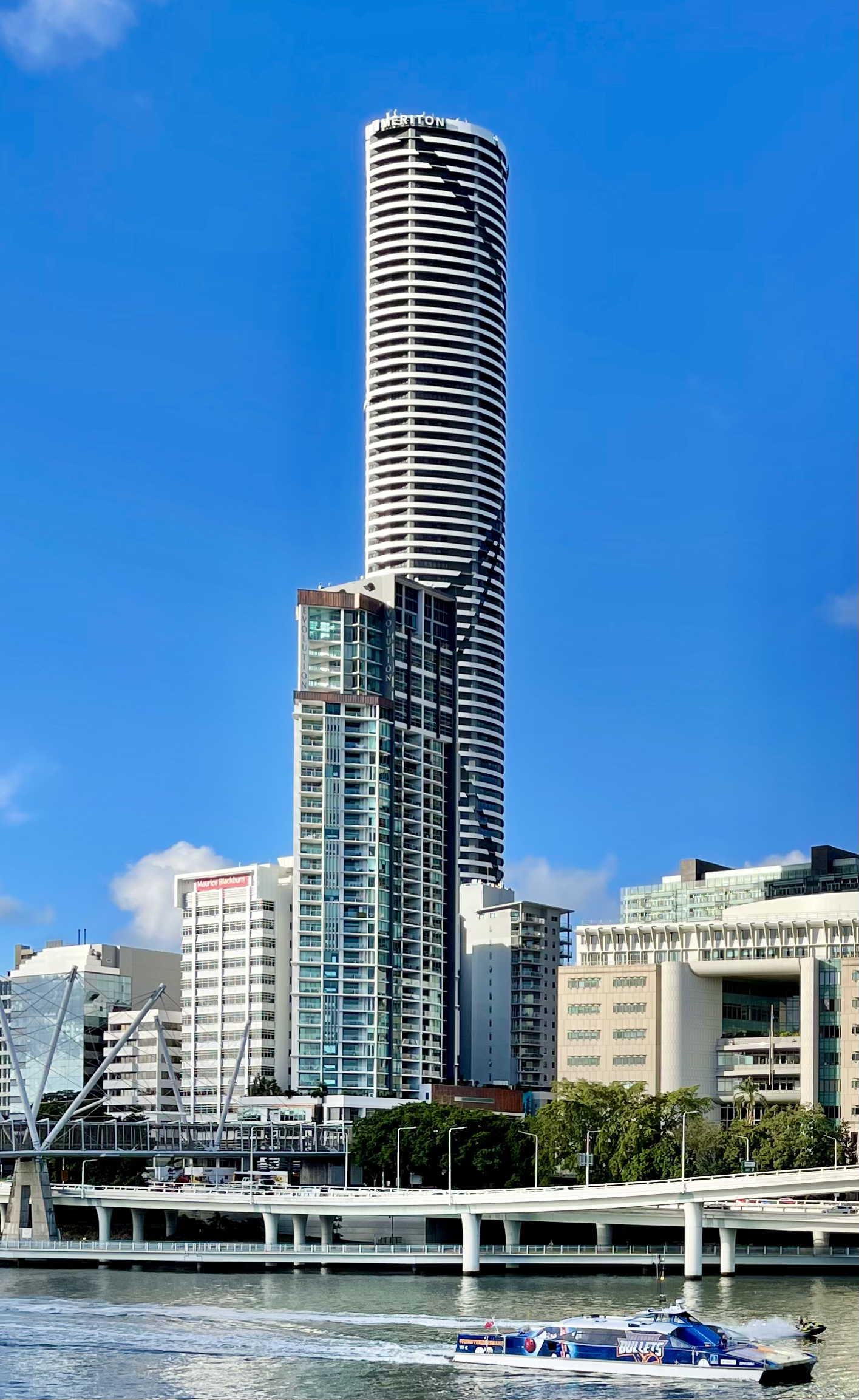
- Infinity Tower in July 2021

General information
- Status: Completed
- Type: Serviced Apartments
- Location: 43 Herschel Street, Brisbane, Australia
- Coordinates: 27°28′04.1″S 153°01′10.38″E
- Construction started: 2009
- Completed: early 2014

Height
- Roof: 262 m (860 ft)

Technical details
- Floor count: 81

Design and construction
- Developer: Meriton
- Main contractor: Meriton

Infinity Tower is a 262-metre (860 ft) skyscraper by Meriton completed in 2014 at 43 Herschel Street Brisbane, Australia. It was the tallest building in Brisbane until it was surpassed by 1 William Street in 2016.

It contains 81 levels of serviced apartments and residential apartments totalling 549 units. It is situated on a relatively small site and is part of the North Quarter district of the Brisbane CBD. It is close to Roma Street railway station, King George Square, Queen Street Mall and the Treasury District. It is also close to the Kurilpa Bridge which gives access to South Bank Parklands and the Queensland Cultural Centre.

Facilities available to tenants includes a spa, lap pool, private gym and sauna. The tower uses Schindler Miconic 10 efficient lift system.

Nearly two-thirds of the building's apartments had been sold as of February 2013.

== Construction ==
Excavation began in November 2009 after Meriton purchased the site, which was formerly a ground level carpark, for A$25 million.

In March 2012, Meriton applied for permission from the federal Department of Infrastructure and Transport to operate a crane at a height of 311 m after the Brisbane City Council approved the addition of four storeys to the design.

The building was officially opened by Queensland Premier, Campbell Newman and Meriton boss, Harry Triguboff on 24 July 2013. Levels 25 to 64 had been progressively completed from November 2013 and the overall construction was finished in early 2014.

== Design ==
The buildings structure is made almost entirely of Reinforced concrete. The vertical and horizontal streaks on the side of building are aluminum facades that are designed to make the building appear taller than it is.

== See also ==
- List of tallest buildings in Brisbane
- List of tallest buildings in Australia

== Construction Gallery ==
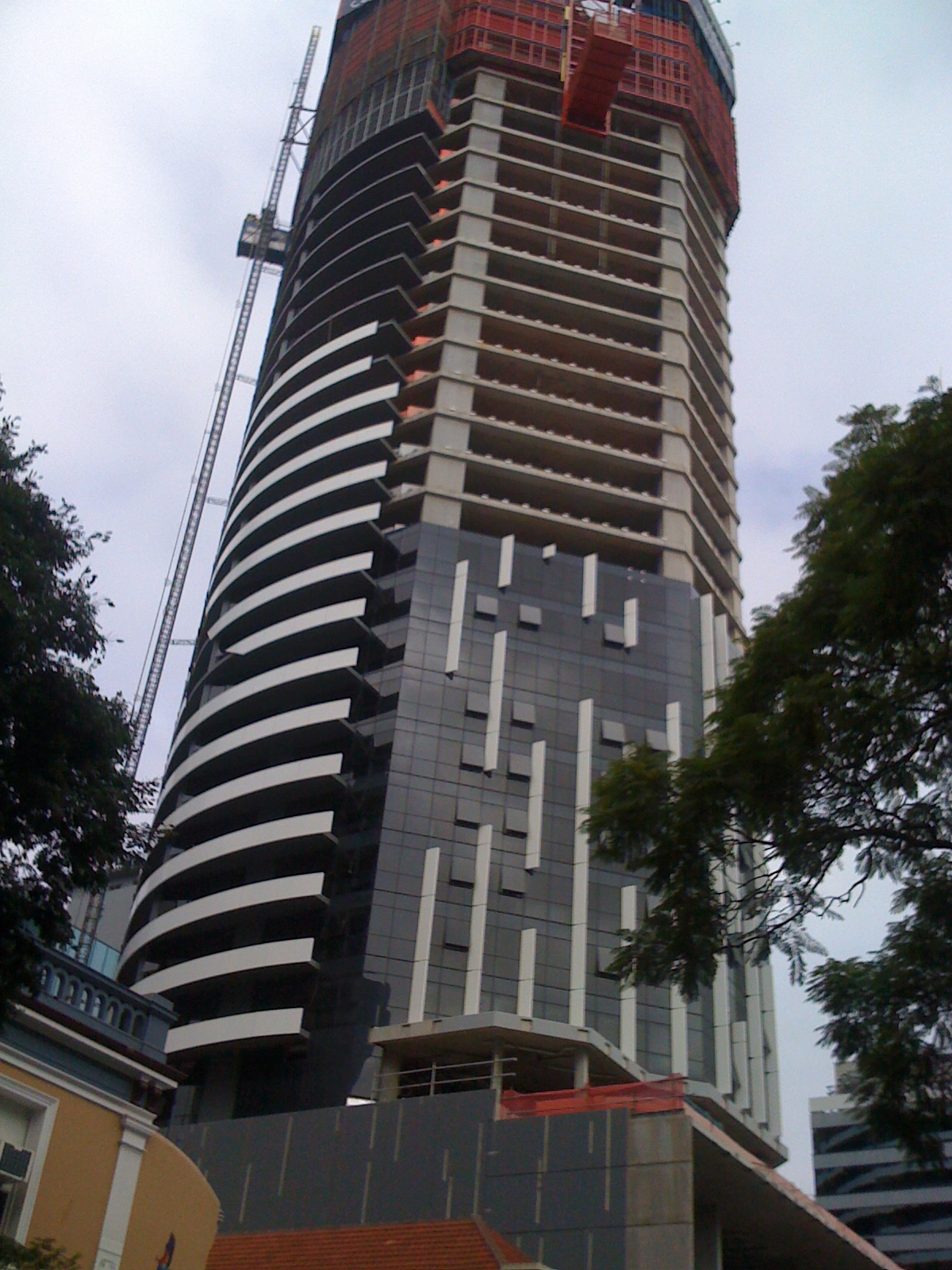
Infinity Tower under construction in July 2012

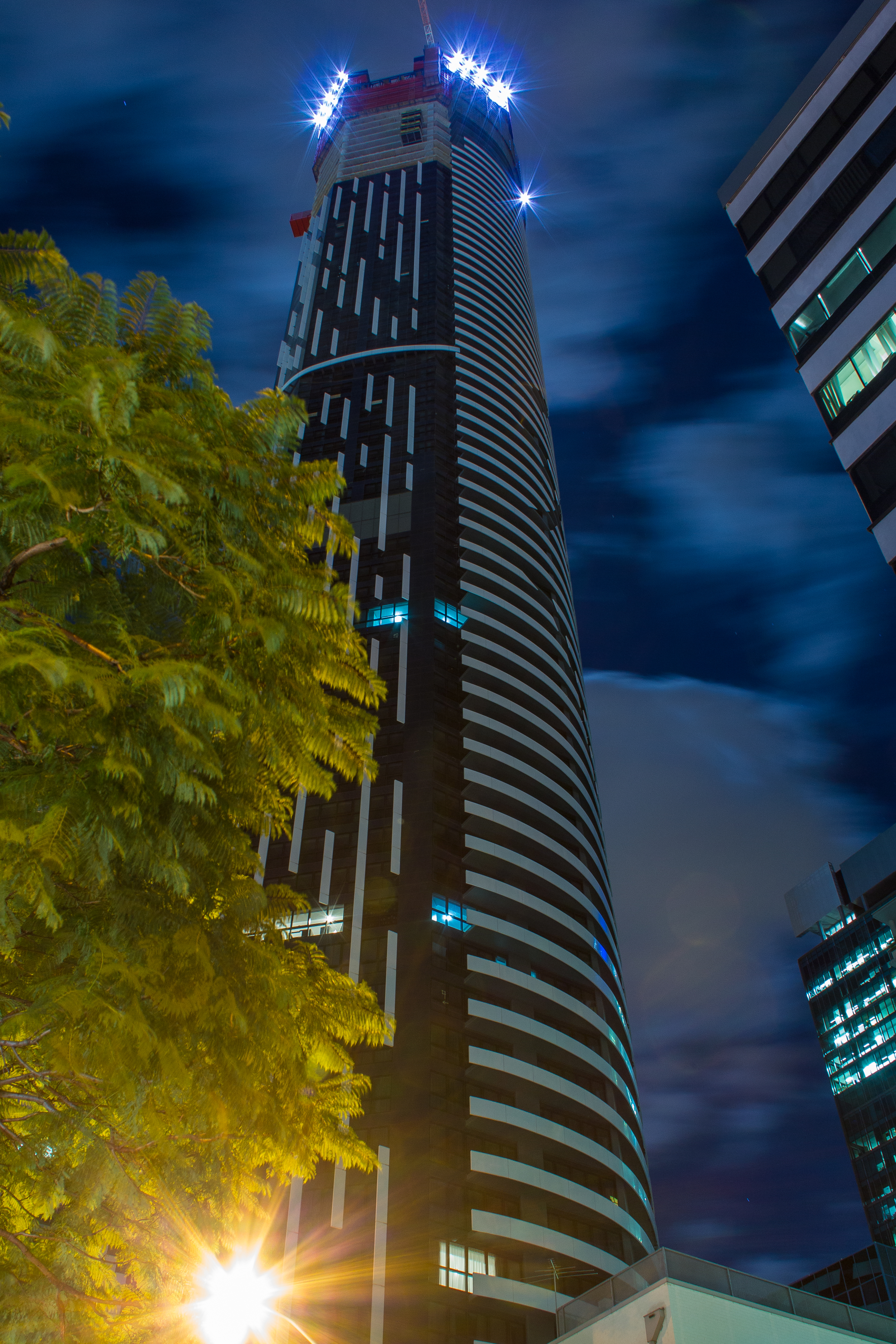
Infinity Tower under construction in April 2013

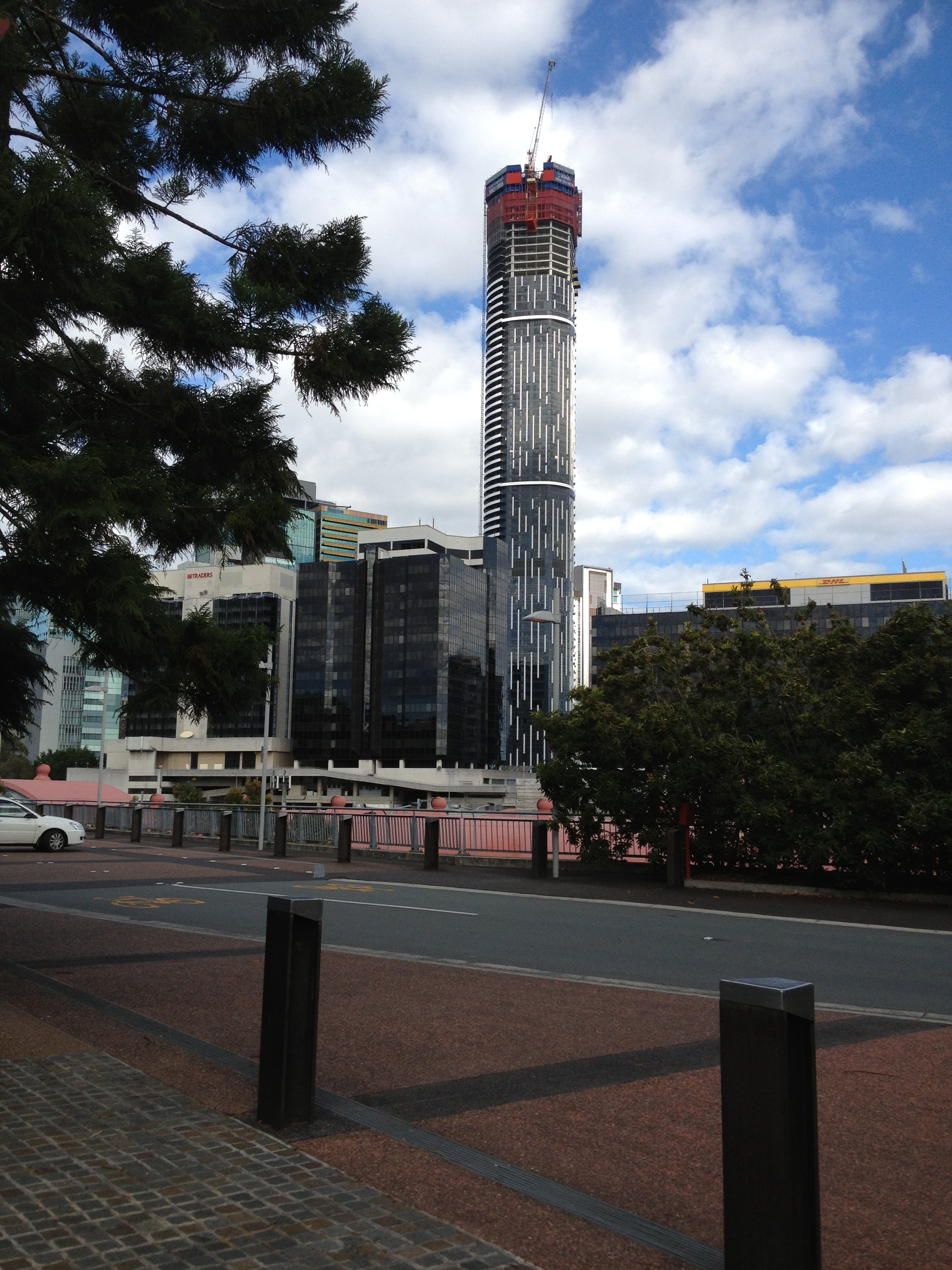
Infinity Tower under construction in May 2013
