= BRW Rich 200, 2016 =

Annual list of wealthiest Australians

The BRW Rich 200, 2016 was the 33rd annual survey of the wealthiest people resident in Australia, published in the Australian Financial Review on 27 May 2016. From its establishment in 1984 and up until the publication of the 2016 list, the survey had been published in either hardcopy and/or online format in the BRW, or formerly, the Business Review Weekly. On 4 March 2016, Fairfax Media announced the closure of the BRW website, and redirected the site to a new section of the Australian Financial Review. Rich lists are now published in The Australian Financial Review Magazine and in 2017 were rebranded as the Financial Review Rich List.

In the 2016 list, the net worth of the wealthiest individual, Harry Triguboff AO, was A$10.62 billion. The combined wealth of the 200 individuals was calculated as A$197.3 billion; compared with a combined wealth of A$6.4 billion in 1984 when the BRW Rich 200 commenced.

== List of individuals ==
2016		Name	Citizenship	Source of wealth	2015	
Rank	Net worth A$ bn	Name	Citizenship	Source of wealth	Rank	Net worth A$ bn
1 ▲	10.62 ▲	Harry Triguboff AO	Australia	Meriton	3 ▲	10.23 ▲
2 ▲	10.35 ▼	Anthony Pratt	Australia	Visy; Pratt Industries	2	10.76 ▲
3 ▼	8.26	Frank Lowy AC	Australia	Westfield; property (shopping centres)	4	7.84 ▲
4 ▼	6.06 ▼	Gina Rinehart	Australia	Hancock Prospecting; investment	1	14.02 ▼
5 ▲	5.45 ▲	John Gandel AO	Australia	Property (shopping centres)	8 ▼	4.40 ▲
6 ▼	5.39 ▼	Hui Wing Mau	People's Republic of China; Australia	Shimao Property	5 ▲	6.89 ▲
7	5.00 ▼	James Packer	Australia	Crown Resorts; Consolidated Media Holdings	7 ▼	6.08 ▼
8 ▲	3.33 ▲	Andrew Forrest	Australia	Fortescue	9 ▼	2.83 ▼
9 ▼	3.33 ▼	Ivan Glasenberg	Australia; South Africa; Switzerland	Glencore commodities trading	6 ▲	6.14 ▼
10						
11 ▼	2.88 ▲	Stan Perron AM	Australia	Property	10 ▲	2.65 ▼

Legend
Icon	Description
Steady	Has not changed from the previous year's list
▲	Has increased from the previous year's list
▼	Has decreased from the previous year's list

== See also ==
- Financial Review Rich List
- Forbes Asia list of Australians by net worth
