= Center for Special Studies =

Intelligence heritage center in Israel

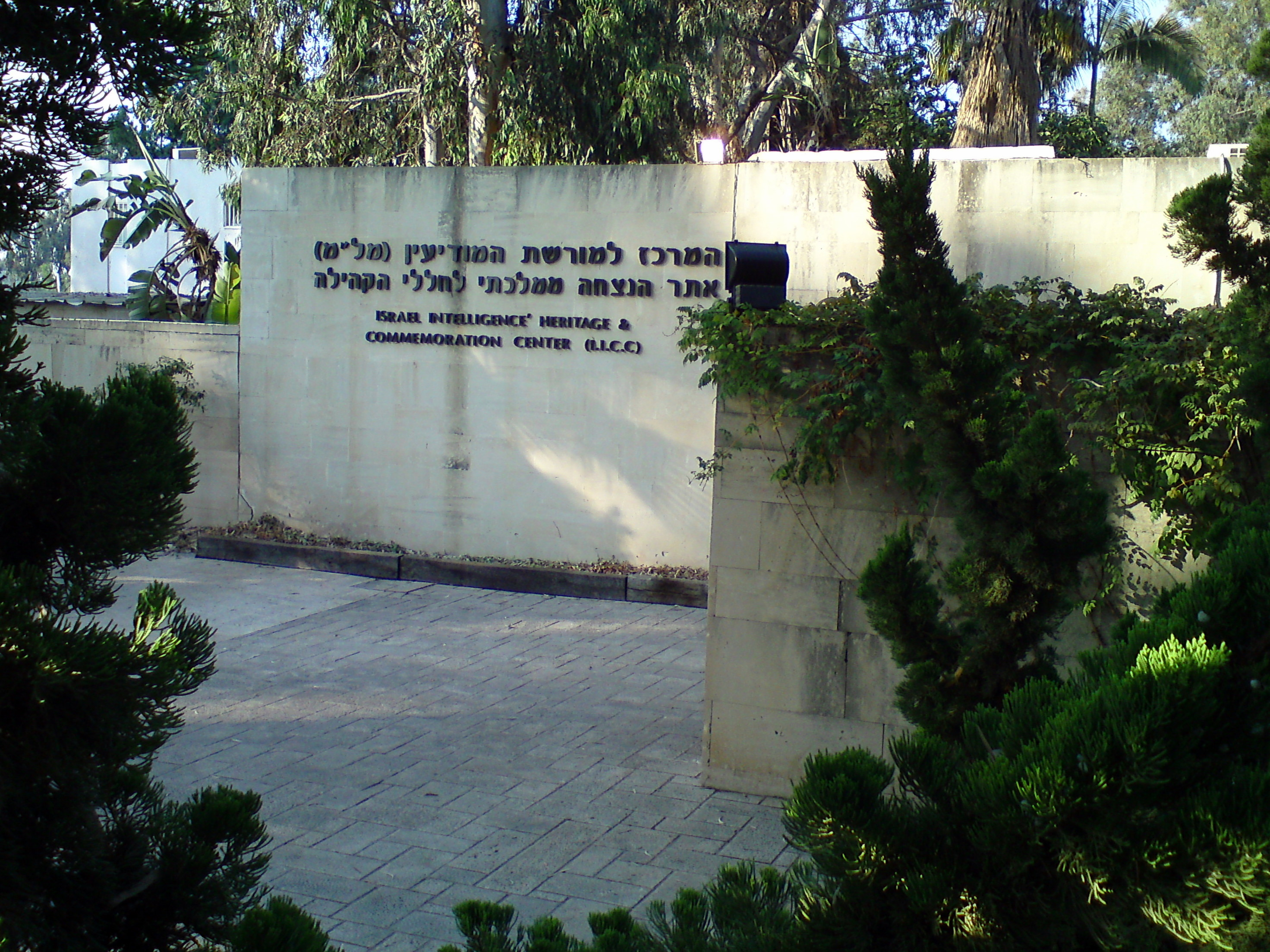
the memorial site for the fallen; Israel Intelligence Heritage & Commemoration Center

The Intelligence Heritage Center Hebrew: המרכז למורשת המודיעין, commonly known as the Center for Special Studies, CSS, also MLM, MLAM, MALAM (Hebrew abbreviation מל"מ of the official name) is an Israeli non-profit organization that aims to document and preserve the heritage of the Israeli Intelligence Community and commemorate its fallen. The idea of organization originated during 1979-1983, and it was formally inaugurated in 1985. It is located near the Glilot military base in Ramat HaSharon.

MALAM has three main bodies that correspond to the thee main branches of Israeli intelligence:Aman (military intelligence), Mossad (overseas intelligence) and Shin Bet (internal security). In addition, the organization Nativ had an association with MALAM, in its early days, because it was part of the Israeli intelligence.

Its part is the Meir Amit Intelligence and Terrorism Information Center, a research institute responsible for publications on intelligence and terrorism established in 2001. In 2016 the Institute for Research on Intelligence Methodology was established.

== Chairmen ==
For over 20 years it was headed by Meir Amit. In 2005 CSS held its first elections for management and Efraim Halevy was elected as its chairman. In 2013 Brigadier General Dr. Zvi Stauber assumed the post. Since 2022 the post is held by Major General Aharon Zeevi Farkash
