= World Tower =

Residential skyscrapter in Sydney, Australia

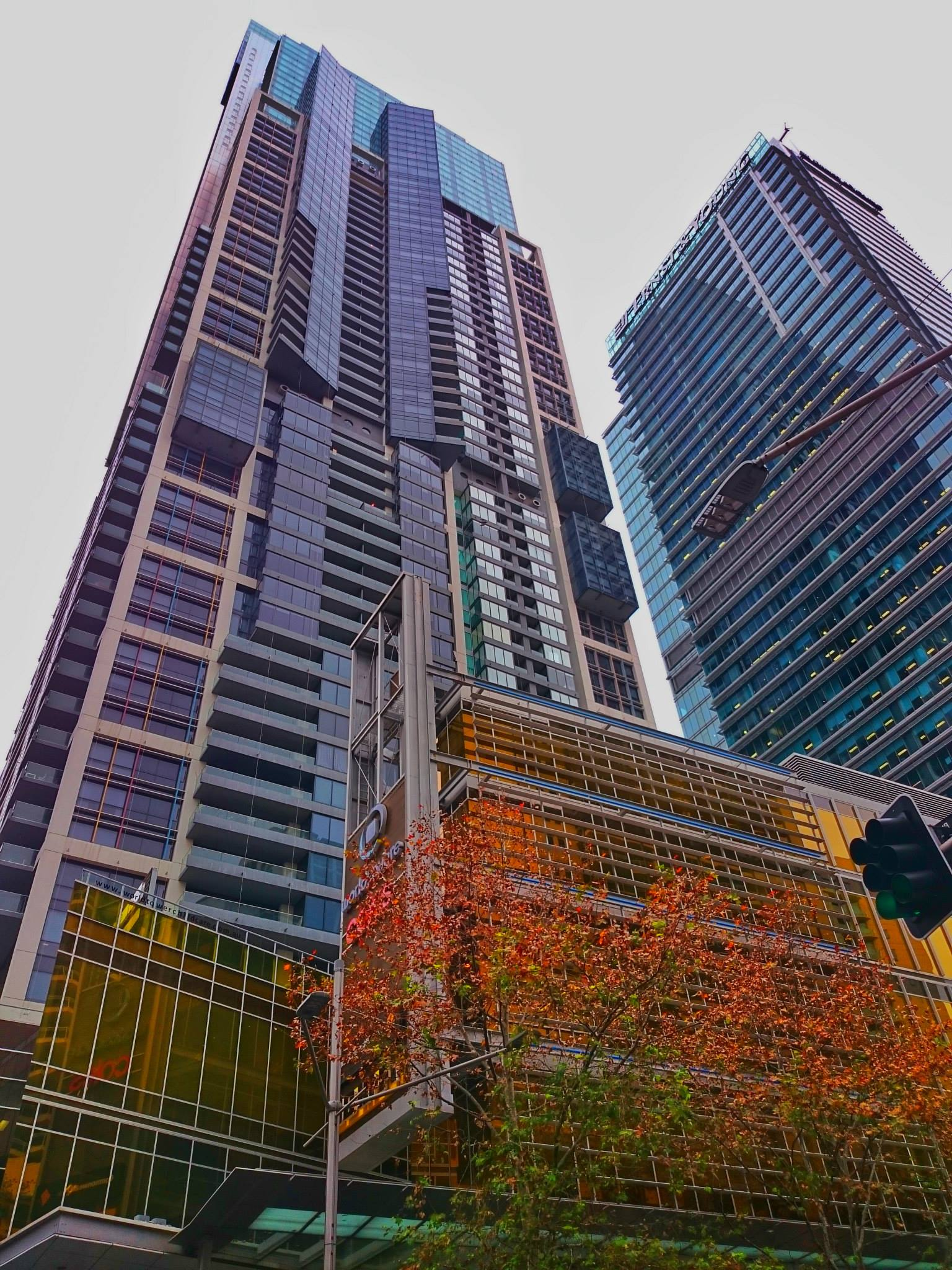
- Interactive map of the World Tower area

General information
- Type: Residential
- Location: 91 Liverpool Street, Sydney; New South Wales, Australia
- Coordinates: 33°52′35″S 151°12′23″E
- Construction started: 2001
- Completed: 2004

Height
- Architectural: 230 m (750 ft)
- Roof: 220 m (720 ft)

Technical details
- Floor count: 84
- Lifts/elevators: 14

Design and construction
- Architecture firm: Fender Katsalidis Architects
- Developer: Meriton

The World Tower is a residential skyscraper in Sydney, Australia. Designed by Fender Katsalidis, it stands at a height of 230 m (750 ft), making it the fourth tallest residential-only building in the city.

Construction began in 2001 and was completed in 2004. Developed by Meriton, The World Tower was the 2004 Bronze recipient of the Emporis Skyscraper Award, and was briefly Australia's tallest residential building from 2004 to 2006.

The World Tower consists of 75 above-ground levels, 10 basement levels, 15 lifts and 701 residential units. Each of the three residential sections of the building has a pool, spa, sauna, gymnasium, games room, and a private 24-seat theatrette. The pool and spa areas on levels 38 and 61 offer 180° views of Sydney. There is also a childcare centre located in the building.

Situated at the foot of World Tower is World Square, a shopping complex with a Coles supermarket, several food outlets, and other specialty stores. The building is a brief walk from light rail and bus stops, and metro and train stations including Town Hall and Museum railway stations.

Scenes for the 1995 film Mighty Morphin Power Rangers: The Movie were shot on the former property of Anthony Hordern & Sons and future site of World Square.

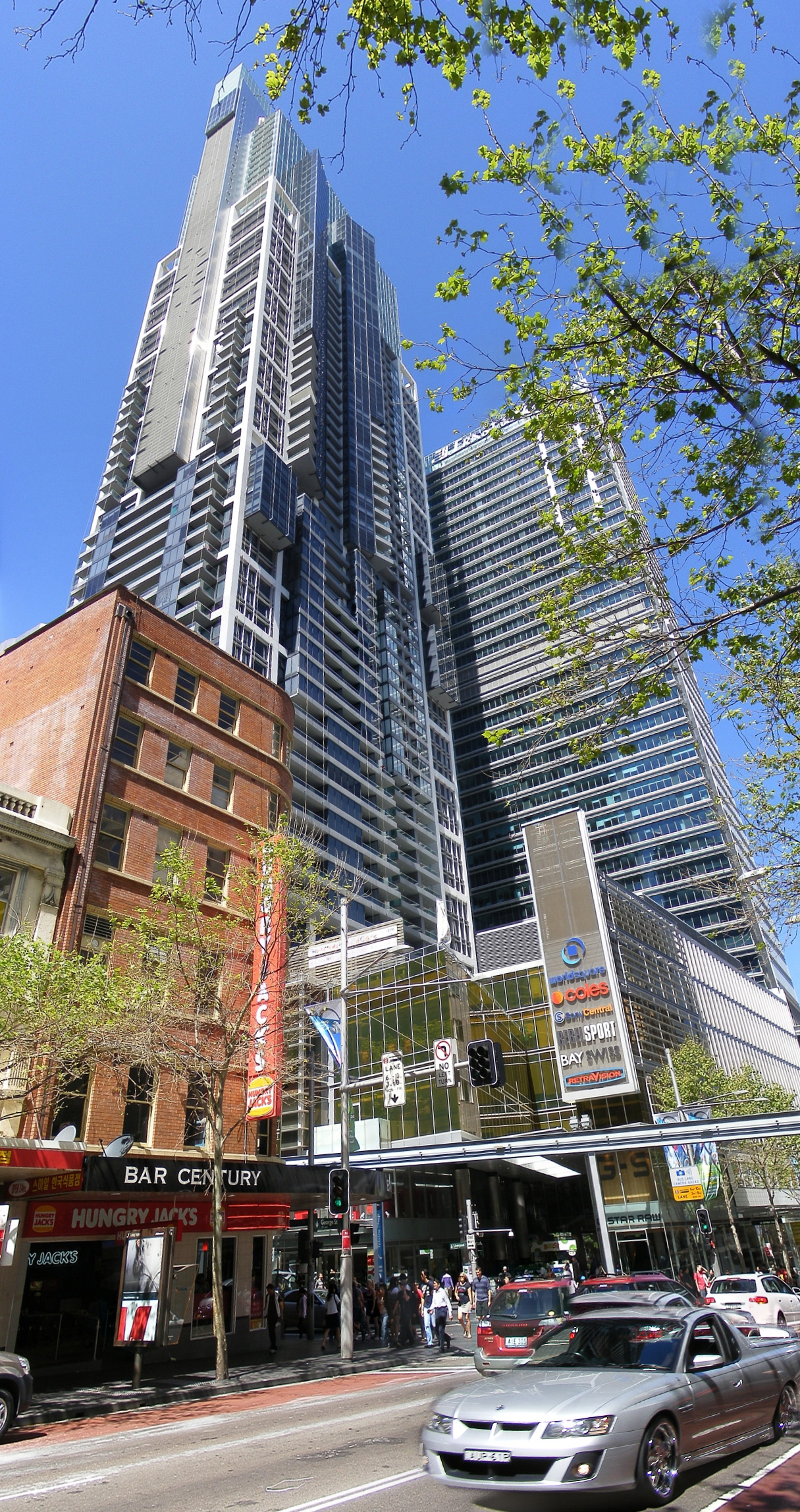
View from north on street level

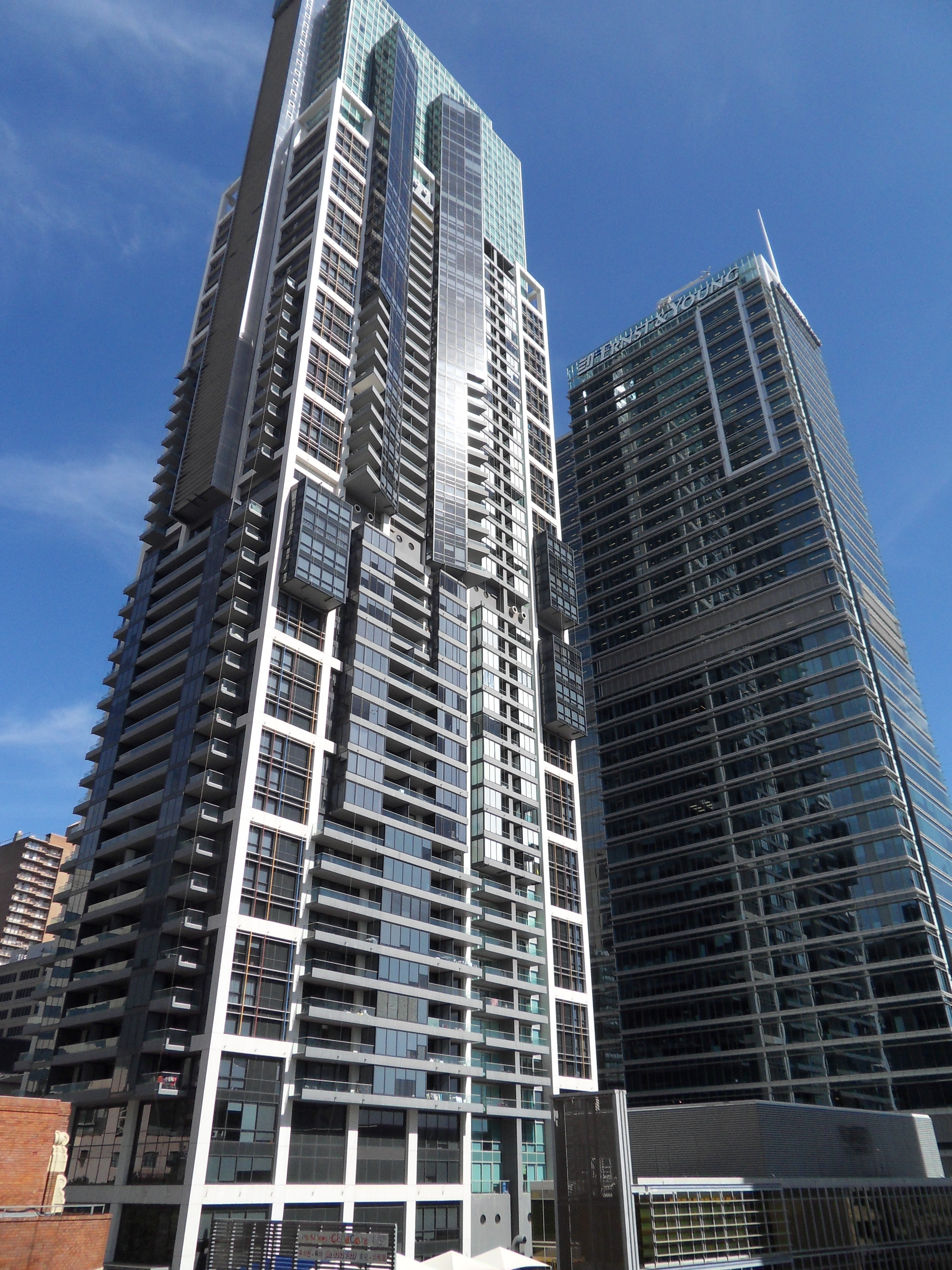
Close up of the tower

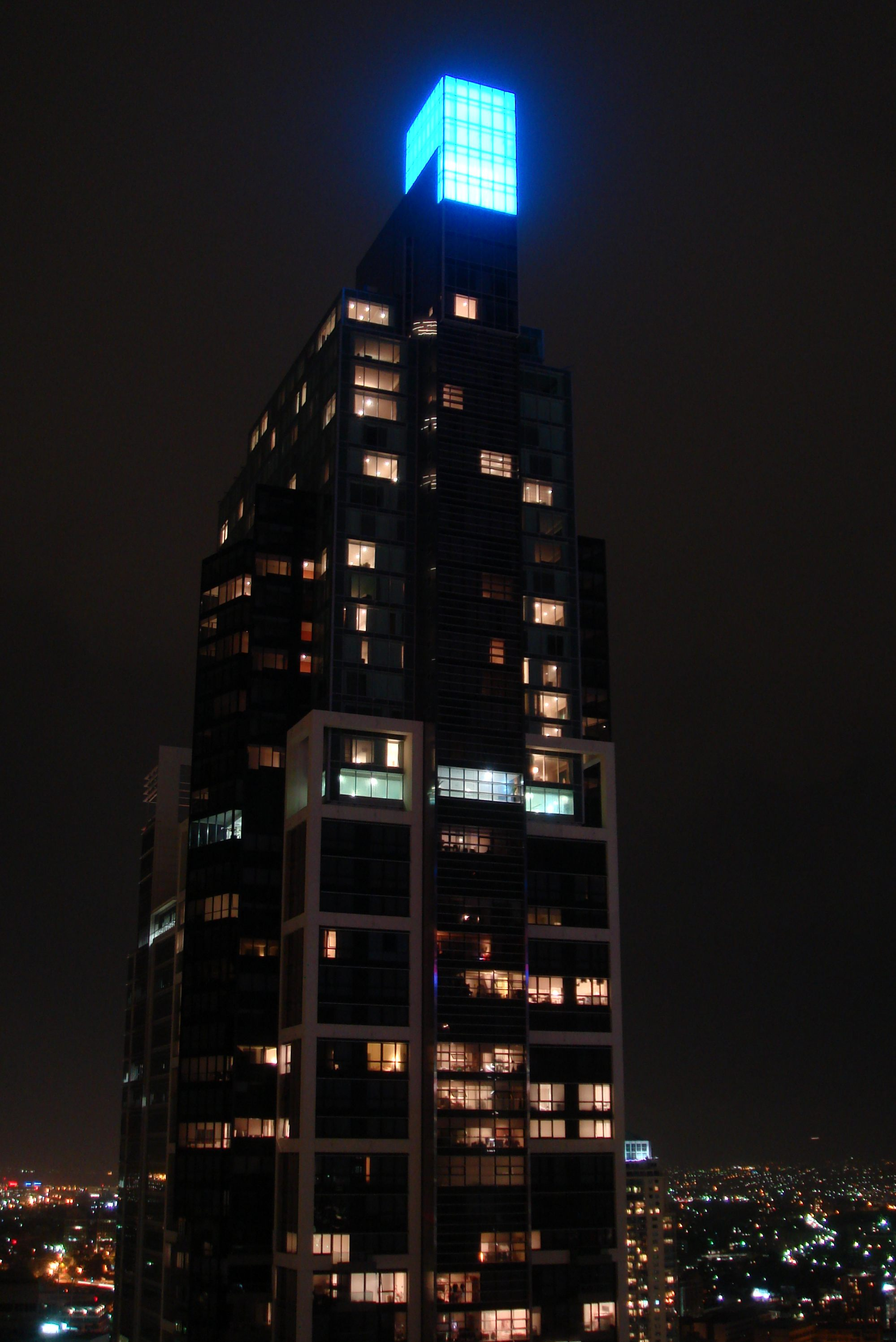
Illuminated roof feature at night

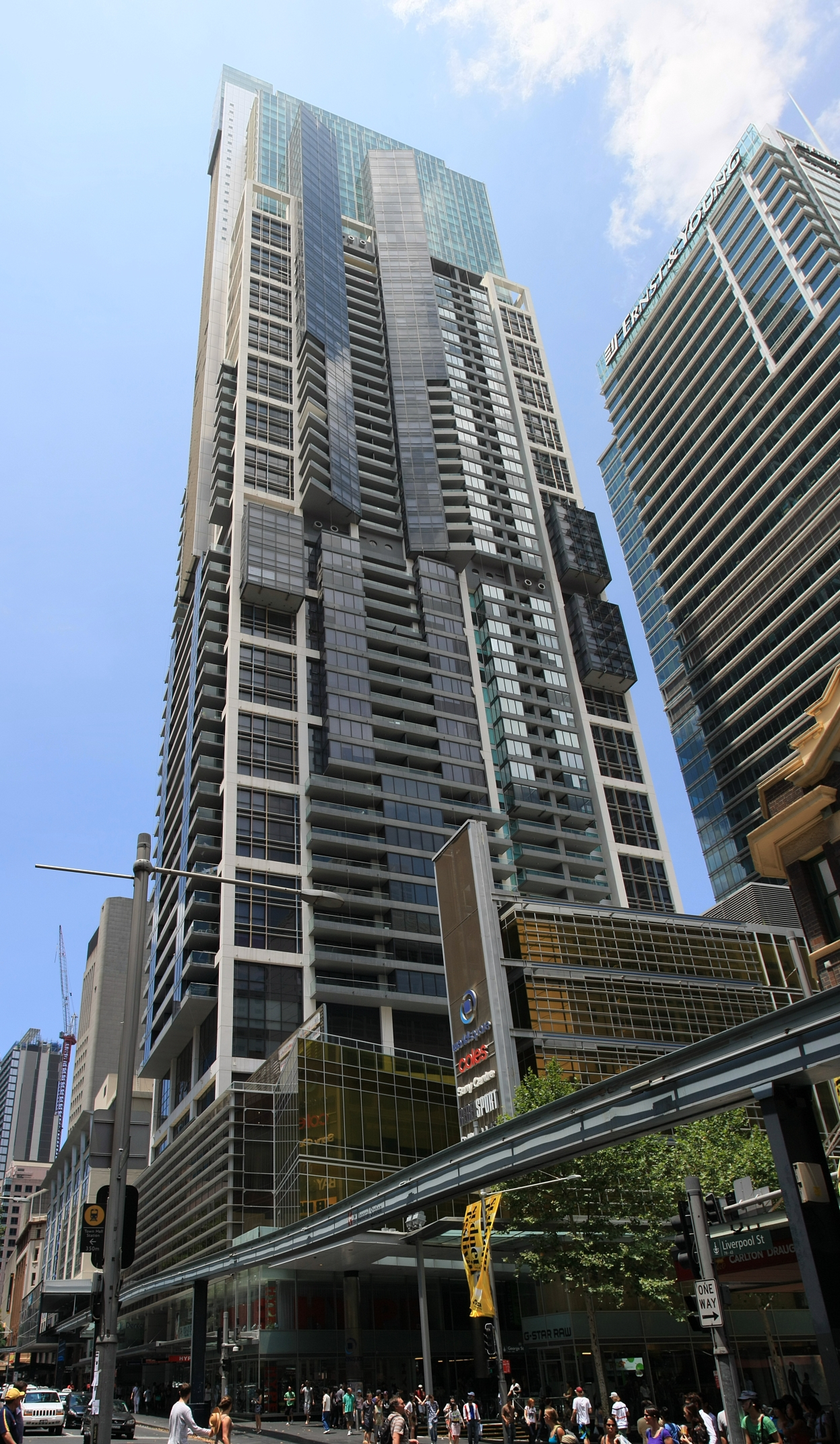
The tower from Liverpool Street

== See also ==
- List of tallest buildings in Australia
- List of tallest buildings in Sydney
