= Harry Triguboff =

Australian property developer and founder of Meriton (born 1933)

Harry Triguboff AO
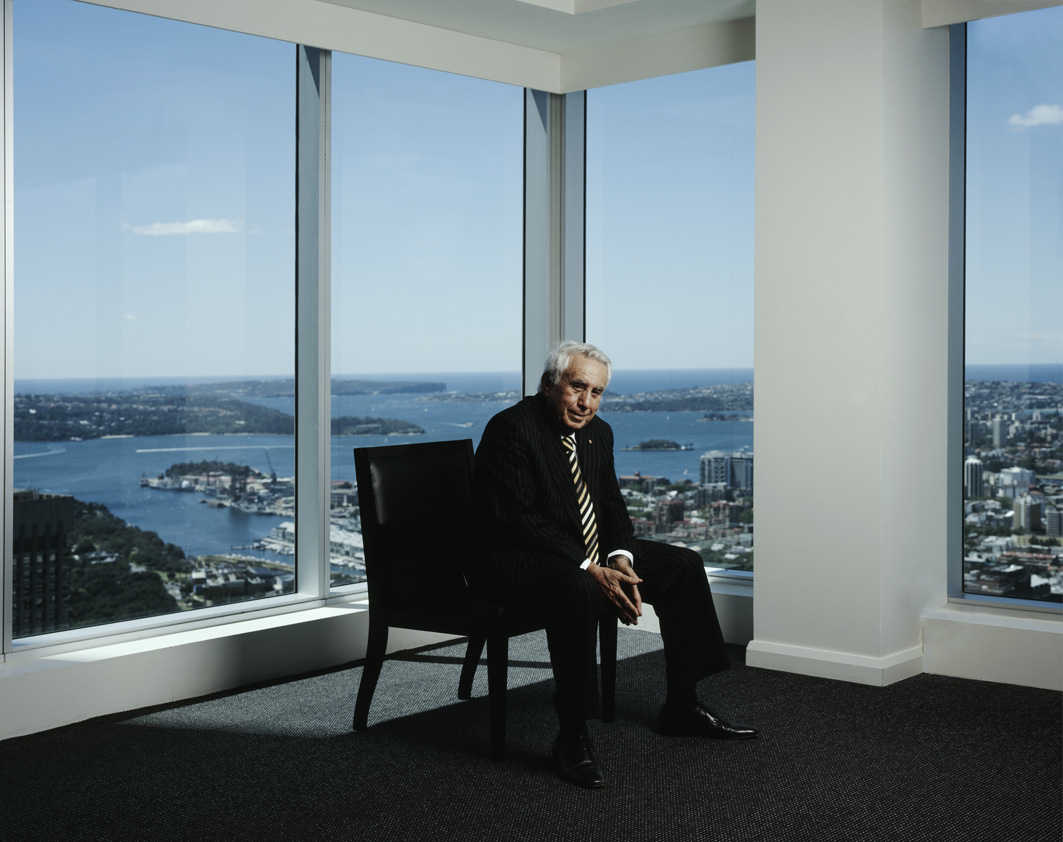
- Triguboff in his World Tower penthouse apartment
- Born: 3 March 1933 (age 93); Dalian, Kwantung Leased Territory
- Citizenship: Australian (since 1961)
- Education: Scots College, Sydney
- Alma mater: University of Leeds
- Occupation: Real estate property development
- Years active: 1963−present
- Known for: Meriton
- Spouses: Hana Triguboff (divorced); Rhonda Triguboff (m. 1980)
- Children: 2

Harry Oskar Triguboff (born 3 March 1933) is an Australian billionaire real estate developer and one of Australia's richest people. He is the founder and managing director of Meriton and is known as "high-rise Harry".

== Early life and education ==
Triguboff was born on 3 March 1933 in Dalian (Dairen at the time), Kwantung Leased Territory. He was the son of Russian Jewish parents, Moshe and Frida. His father moved to China in 1916 to escape antisemitism in the Russian Empire.

Triguboff grew up in the Jewish community in Tianjin, in the British and American concessions. His father established a store that traded wool, silk and leather. In 1937, during the Second Sino-Japanese War, the Imperial Japanese Army invaded the city. The foreign concessions were initially left untouched, but following the invasion of Pearl Harbor in 1941 the British and American residents were placed into internment camps. The Russian residents subsequently "seized the opportunity to take over trade in and out of China". Triguboff's father opened four more stores and acquired 20 apartments, as well as a summer residence in Beidaihe. He helped distribute the textiles that had been seized by the Japanese to buyers in northern China. In 1946, after the war's end, he was convicted of collaboration with the Japanese for allegedly selling leather goods and scrap metal to the Japanese government. However, the following year he was acquitted on appeal to the Supreme Court of the Republic of China.

In 1946, Triguboff's family obtained landing permission for Australia, after being refused visas to Canada and the United States. He and his brother were sent to Sydney in 1948, but the Australian government attempted to exclude them from the country over concerns about their father's war-time activities. Osmond Charles Fuhrman, the Australian consul in Shanghai at the time, estimated that their father had a net worth of up to US$4 million (equivalent to $54,000,000 in 2025). Triguboff was ultimately allowed into the country and was educated at the Scots College, Sydney. He later graduated with a degree in textiles from the University of Leeds in England, before working in textile businesses in Israel and South Africa.

He returned to Australia in 1950 and became an Australian citizen in 1961. He ran various businesses, including running a taxi fleet and owning a milk round in Chatswood. He tried selling real estate and worked as an assistant to a lecturer at university. He then bought some land in Roseville and hired a builder to begin building his house. The builder failed to complete the work and Triguboff finished the job himself, learning from his mistakes.

== Career ==
From the experience gained in his initial development, Triguboff bought his second block of land in 1963, this time in Smith Street, Tempe, and began building a block of eight units with a partner. He made a profit, which led to a second development in 1968 in Gladesville. At Meriton Street, Triguboff built a block of 18 units which provided the name of the company he registered as developers.

Triguboff is the managing director of Meriton Apartments Pty Ltd. As of 2015, Meriton had built more than 55,000 residential townhouses and apartments since its creation in 1963, making it Australia's biggest residential property developer. In 2010, Meriton was said to develop an average of 1,000 apartments per year. As of 2015, the average exceeds 3,000 per annum. In particular, Triguboff has concentrated on the Gold Coast and Brisbane in Queensland, and Sydney's central business district, building more apartments than any other Australian residential developer. He is a proponent that the population of Australia should grow to reach 100 million.

In 2004, Meriton completed the construction of World Tower, Sydney's tallest residential apartment building. During 2012, Meriton and the owners' corporation became embroiled in a long running court dispute over major building defects and alleged breaches of their contract, with maintenance issues worth more than A$1 million. Part of the issue related to Meriton, the original builder, being locked out of the development. By 2015, He had built approximately 55,000 residential townhouses and apartments.

The company has been a sponsor of the Wests Tigers (and their predecessor, Balmain Tigers) since 1998. Triguboff committed Meriton throughout the club's merger period of 2000 and into 2015.

In September 2023, Triguboff opened a new Meriton hotel, bringing the business to have an estimated value of $7.2 bn. It was also the largest Australian owned and operated hotel company.

In June 2023, under Triguboff, Meriton renewed plans to build up to 1,600 homes in Little Bay in Sydney, on land it had previously purchased for around $250 million. For years, the development proposal had faced "some public opposition" concerning how the area would be developed, while Triguboff had been lobbying local government.

In September 2023, Triguboff oversaw new hotels opening for the first time in Canberra and Melbourne, as well as a new hotel in Liverpool near Sydney, bringing Meriton Suites to 6204 apartment suites and 23 properties. Meriton Suites had invested $400 million in the three new hotel properties. A new three tower apartment complex was approved for Surfers Paradise in October 2023.

In December 2024, he appeared on the Straight Talk with Mark Bouris podcast and warned that Chinese migrants may take over Australia.

== Politics and lobbying ==
Triguboff donates heavily to political parties and uses his influence to seek policy changes and funding for Israel. In August 2010, he proposed that the federal government should insist on Reserve Bank interest rates being dropped to improve housing affordability.

Triguboff supports increasing immigration to Australia and supports Australia's population growing to 100 million .

Triguboff supports the declassification of national parks in Australia to allow Meriton to build housing on them.

== Controversies ==
=== Building defects ===
Meriton-developed buildings have been the subject of multiple disputes over construction defects. In 2002, owners at the 653-apartment Regis Towers in Sydney commenced legal action against Meriton in the NSW Supreme Court over building defects. Meriton agreed to co-operate and signed deeds to fix the problems; the case was dropped in late 2003.

At World Tower, completed in 2004, the owners' corporation served Meriton with at least 15 official breach notices between 2011 and 2013, alleging building defects and maintenance issues worth more than A$1 million. Complaints included fire safety defects, flooding from faulty work, malfunctioning lifts that trapped residents, and defective swipe-card systems. An independent review identified more than $1 million in serious defects.

In 2019, residents of Meriton's Altitude Tower in Parramatta were forced to vacate their apartments after a septic tank leak contaminated their belongings.

=== TripAdvisor review manipulation ===
In 2018, the Federal Court of Australia found that Meriton Property Services had engaged in misleading and deceptive conduct by manipulating guest reviews on TripAdvisor. Staff had been directed by management to "mask" the email addresses of guests likely to leave negative reviews, preventing them from receiving TripAdvisor's automated review invitation emails. Approximately 14,500 guest email addresses were masked over an eleven-month period in 2015 across 13 Meriton serviced apartment properties in New South Wales and Queensland.

The court ordered Meriton to pay a penalty of A$3 million. The Australian Competition and Consumer Commission had sought a penalty of $20 million, while Meriton argued it should be between $330,000 and $440,000. The court found that the practice was systemic, directed by senior management, and not the conduct of "rogue" employees. Meriton was also ordered to implement a consumer law compliance program and was banned for three years from filtering guest email addresses supplied to TripAdvisor.

== Personal life ==
Triguboff is Jewish and was born in China. He has been married twice and has two daughters from his first marriage, Orna and Sharon. His second wife, Rhonda, died in September 2024. He lives in Sydney and owns a collection of cars.

=== Net worth ===
As of May 2025, Triguboff's personal net worth was estimated by the Australian Financial Review at A$29.65 billion, as published in the 2025 Rich List. Triguboff was one of seven Australians who have appeared in every Financial Review Rich List, or its predecessor, the BRW Rich 200, since it was first published in 1984. Triguboff's net worth was assessed at A$10.62 billion in the 2016 Rich List, making him the richest Australian; and he held the mantle for one year.

In 2021, Forbes Asia estimated Triguboff's net worth at US$11.3 billion. In 2015, Forbes Asia magazine's annual billionaires list assessed Triguboff as the world's 262nd wealthiest billionaire. His earnings result from leasing most of his developments to short and long term tenants, with benefits from capital appreciation. His net worth was assessed as A$23.6 billion in 2023, on The Australian's Richest 250 list for that year.

Year	Financial Review Rich 200		Forbes Australia's 50 Richest	
Year	Rank	Net worth (A$)	Rank	Net worth (US$)
2011	7 ▼	$4.30 billion ▲	5	$3.40 billion ▲
2012	7	$4.85 billion ▲	5	$5.80 billion ▲
2013	6 ▲	$4.95 billion ▲	6 ▼	$4.60 billion ▼
2014	8 ▼	$5.50 billion ▲	7 ▼	$4.30 billion ▼
2015	3 ▲	$10.23 billion ▲	2 ▲	$5.6 billion ▲
2016	1 ▲	$10.62 billion ▲	3 ▼	$6.90 billion ▲
2017	2 ▼	$11.40 billion ▲	2 ▲	$9.90 billion ▲
2018	2	$12.77 billion ▲	2	
2019	3 ▼	$13.54 billion ▲	2	$9.00 billion ▲
2020	7 ▼	$14.42 billion ▲		
2021	6 ▲	$17.27 billion ▲		$11.30 billion ▲
2022	6	$21.20 billion ▲		
2023	4 ▲	$23.80 billion ▲		
2024	2 ▲	$26.49 billion ▲		
2025	2	$29.65 billion ▲		

Legend
Icon	Description
Steady	Has not changed from the previous year
▲	Has increased from the previous year
▼	Has decreased from the previous year

=== Honours ===
Triguboff was appointed a Member of the Order of Australia on 26 January 1990 "for service to building and construction and for philanthropy" and an Officer of the Order on 7 June 1999 "for service to the community as a philanthropist, and to the residential construction industry".

Triguboff was the first person to win Australia's Property Person of the Year award twice; he first won the award in 2003 and then again in 2009.

=== Philanthropy ===
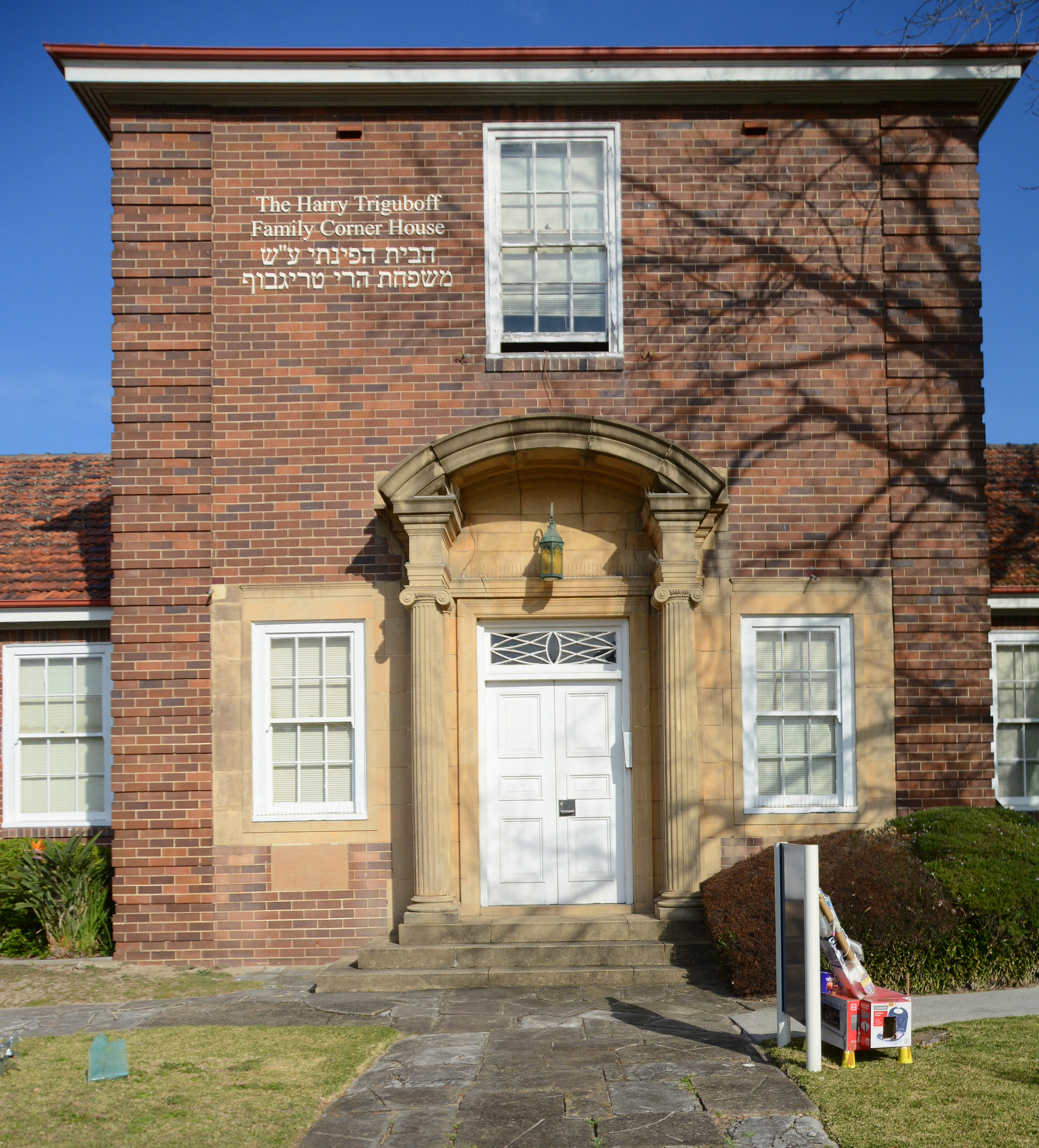
Harry Triguboff Family Corner House, Moriah College, Sydney

Triguboff, via The Harry Triguboff Foundation, funded a project at the Shorashim Center to assist immigrant applicants to Israel in proving their Jewishness.

Triguboff participated in a 2010 Business Review Weekly magazine contest to "Win a Week With a Billionaire". Three young finalists were flown to Sydney where they spent a week at Meriton being mentored by Triguboff.
