= Meir Amit =

Israeli politician (1921–2009)

- מאיר עמית
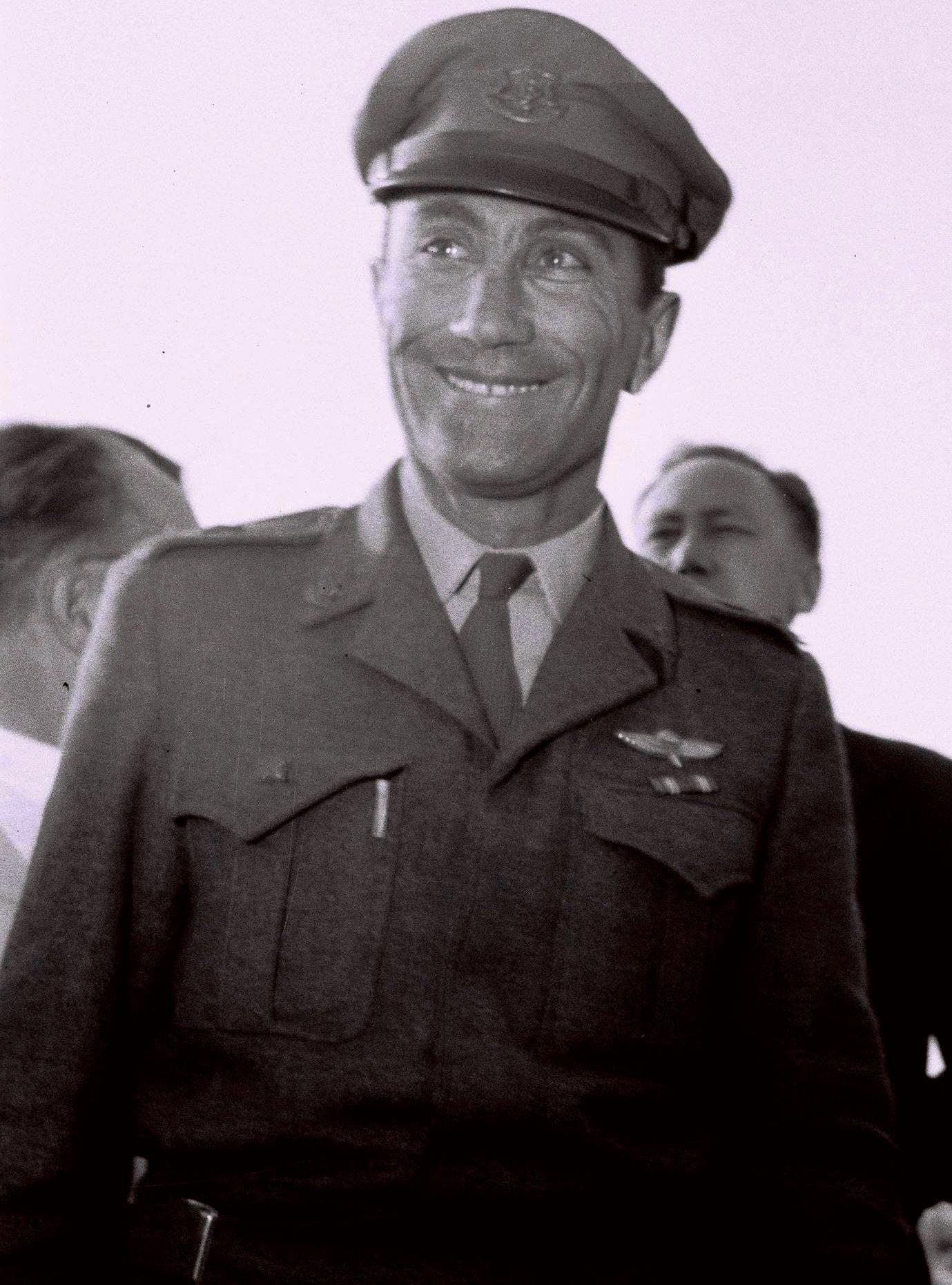
- Amit in 1957

Director of Mossad
- In office 1963–1968
- Prime Minister: David Ben-Gurion; Levi Eshkol
- Preceded by: Isser Harel
- Succeeded by: Zvi Zamir

Ministerial roles
- 1977–1978: Minister of Transportation
- 1977–1978: Minister of Communications

Faction represented in the Knesset
- 1977–1978: Democratic Movement for Change
- 1978–1980: Shinui
- 1980–1981: Alignment

Personal details
- Born: 17 March 1921 Tiberias, Mandatory Palestine
- Died: 17 July 2009 (aged 88) Tel Aviv, Israel
- Awards: Israel Prize (2003)
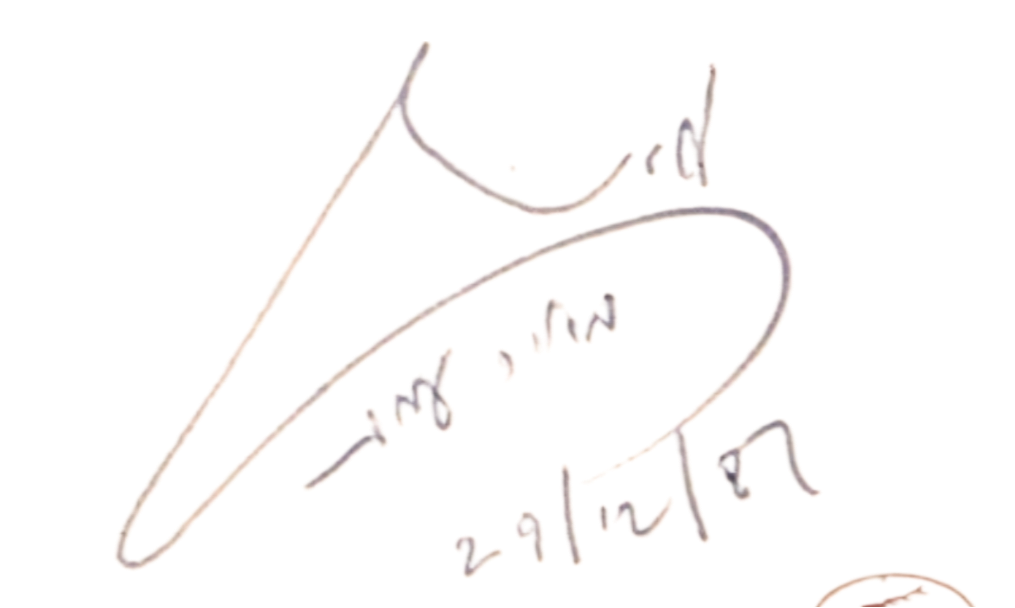
- Signature

Meir Amit (Hebrew: מאיר עמית; 17 March 1921 – 17 July 2009) was an Israeli politician and cabinet minister. He served as the Chief Director and the head of global operations for Mossad from 1963 to 1968, before entering into politics and holding two ministerial positions.

== Early life ==
Amit was born in Tiberias as Meir Slutsky during the Mandate era, cousin of the Russian-Jewish poet, Boris Slutsky. He later adopted the name Amit which means "colleague" in Hebrew and was called Meir Amit Slutsky. At a young age, he joined kibbutz Alonim in the lower Galilee and enlisted in the Haganah. He fought for the Haganah in the 1947–1948 civil war in Mandatory Palestine and then the Israel Defense Forces during the 1948 Arab–Israeli War. He remained in the military and rose through the ranks to become a major general. In the late 1950s, Amit studied at Columbia Business School in New York City, earning an MBA degree.

== Career ==
After returning to Israel, Amit entered the Israeli intelligence community, first as a major general at the head of IDF Intelligence in 1961, and then as Mossad Director in 1963.

As director, he orchestrated some of the Mossad's most important exploits, including sending Eli Cohen to penetrate the highest levels of the Syrian government, and Operation Diamond in which an Iraqi pilot flew a Mig-21 from Iraq to Israel. During the lead up to the Six-Day War in 1967, Amit operated a network of informants that permeated the Egyptian military and provided key details for Operation Focus, Israel's pre-emptive strike on Egyptian air bases and subsequent ground offensive.

== Later career ==
Following his retirement from the Mossad, he continued to be an active voice in the intelligence community and did work for the Israeli government. Following the lead of other former generals, Amit joined the Democratic Movement for Change party, and was elected to the Knesset in the 1977 elections. He was appointed Minister of Transportation and Minister of Communications in Menachem Begin's government, but resigned both posts on 15 September 1978 after the Democratic Movement for Change broke up. Amit subsequently joined Shinui, before defecting to the Alignment (The Israeli labor party) in 1980. He lost his seat in the 1981 elections.

He was later the chairman of Israel's Center for Special Studies, and in 2003, was awarded the Israel Prize for lifetime achievement and special contribution to society and the State.

== Death and commemoration ==
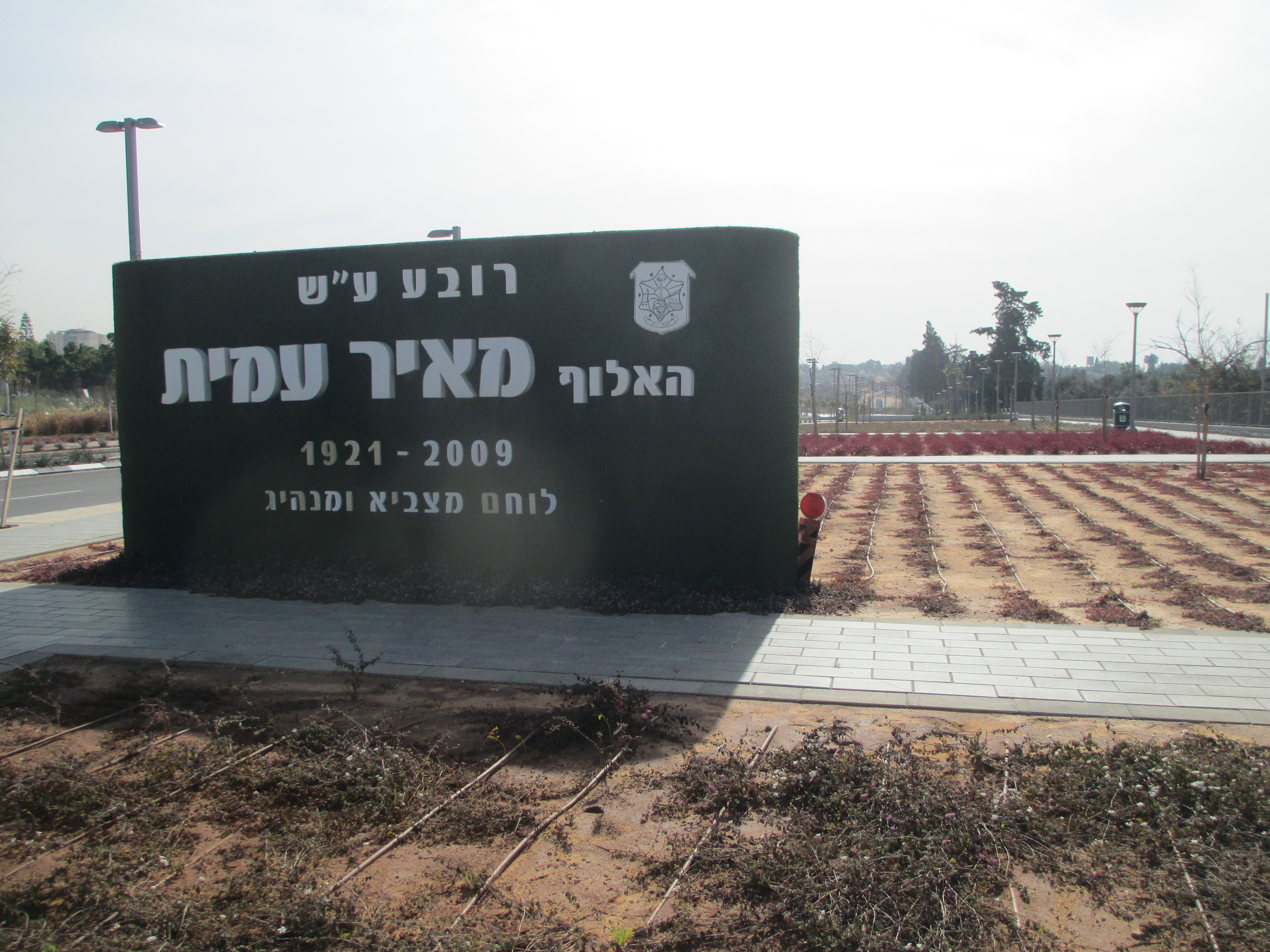
Meir Amit neighborhood in Ramat Gan

Upon news of his death in July 2009, Israeli President Shimon Peres stated:

"Entire Generations owe Meir Amit Slutsky a debt of gratitude for his immense contribution to Mossad and the defense community, a large part which remains secret now in building the strength and deterrence of Israel. He was a natural leader, whom people trusted, and at the same time he was a visionary for the state. We are proud to have a personality of his stature born in our country."
