= Meriton =

Australian residential developer

- Industry: Property development and serviced apartments
- Founded: 1963
- Founder: Harry Triguboff
- Products: Apartments
- Owner: Harry Triguboff
- Website: meriton.com.au

Meriton is an Australian property developer and construction company established in 1963. Meriton builds and sells apartments, and also operates serviced apartments as temporary and long-term accommodation under its Meriton Suites brand in Sydney, Brisbane and the Gold Coast.

In 2007, it was estimated the company was building about 1,200 apartments each year. By 2010 this figure had increased to 2,000 units. It is estimated that over the past 60 years, Meriton has built more than 79,000 residential apartments on the east coast of Australia. It also offers serviced accommodation in 23 locations.

On 13 November 2013, Meriton celebrated its 50th anniversary with a party on Sydney Harbour for more than 300 current and former employees, friends, family and dignitaries from the political and business world.

2014 was a record year for the apartment developer, with the company's annual turnover rising more than 50 per cent to $2 billion, bringing it to 11th place in IBISWorld's 2014 Top 500 Companies, up from 29th spot the previous year. The HIA-Colorbond steel Housing 100 named Meriton as Australia's largest residential home builder, up more than 5000 housing starts, from 2573 in FY2013–14 to 7929. Based on this figure, new homes by Meriton accounted for around 10 per cent of all multi-unit dwellings commenced in Australia, and 29.5 per cent of all multi-unit dwellings commenced in New South Wales. Meriton projects equated to approximately 0.05 per cent of Australia's GDP.

Meriton has about 15,000 apartments in its development pipeline. In recent years, Meriton has shifted focus to providing retail, recreational and childcare facilities alongside residential and serviced apartments.

In July 2018, Meriton was fined $3 million for manipulating TripAdvisor reviews.

In January 2022, the company was the victim of a data breach that is believed to have been orchestrated by cybercriminals. Staff and guests were contacted to notify them know that their personal information may have been accessed during the leak. It was believed that almost 2000 people were affected by the breach and were contacted by the company.

== History ==
Meriton had its start after a young Harry Triguboff built his first home in Roseville, Sydney, in 1960. Allegedly, the contractor Triguboff hired let him down, so he decided to complete the job himself and, as a result, he developed a taste for construction. A few years later, in 1963, he decided to take on an eight-block apartment project in Tempe with just three workers. The units sold for $9,750 each, and the car space was an extra $500.

In 1969, he completed a development of 18 apartments on Meriton Street, Gladesville, which gave rise to the company name.

Triguboff, or 'High-Rise Harry', as he became known, is claimed to have built his fortune by tapping into a perceived need for affordable apartments, particularly in the rush of post-war migrants from countries where inner-city apartment living was commonplace.

After floating Meriton on the Australian Securities Exchange in 1969, Triguboff bought back all the company's shares in 1973. Meriton has since remained a private company, shielded from the vicissitudes of the global financial markets.

A downturn in the property market in the 1970s saw Meriton withdraw some of its apartments for sale, and rent them out instead. Residential leasing now forms an important aspect of its business. The other arms of Meriton include strata property management and property financing.

In 1984, Meriton expanded interstate to Queensland, with a focus on Brisbane and the Gold Coast.

== Properties ==
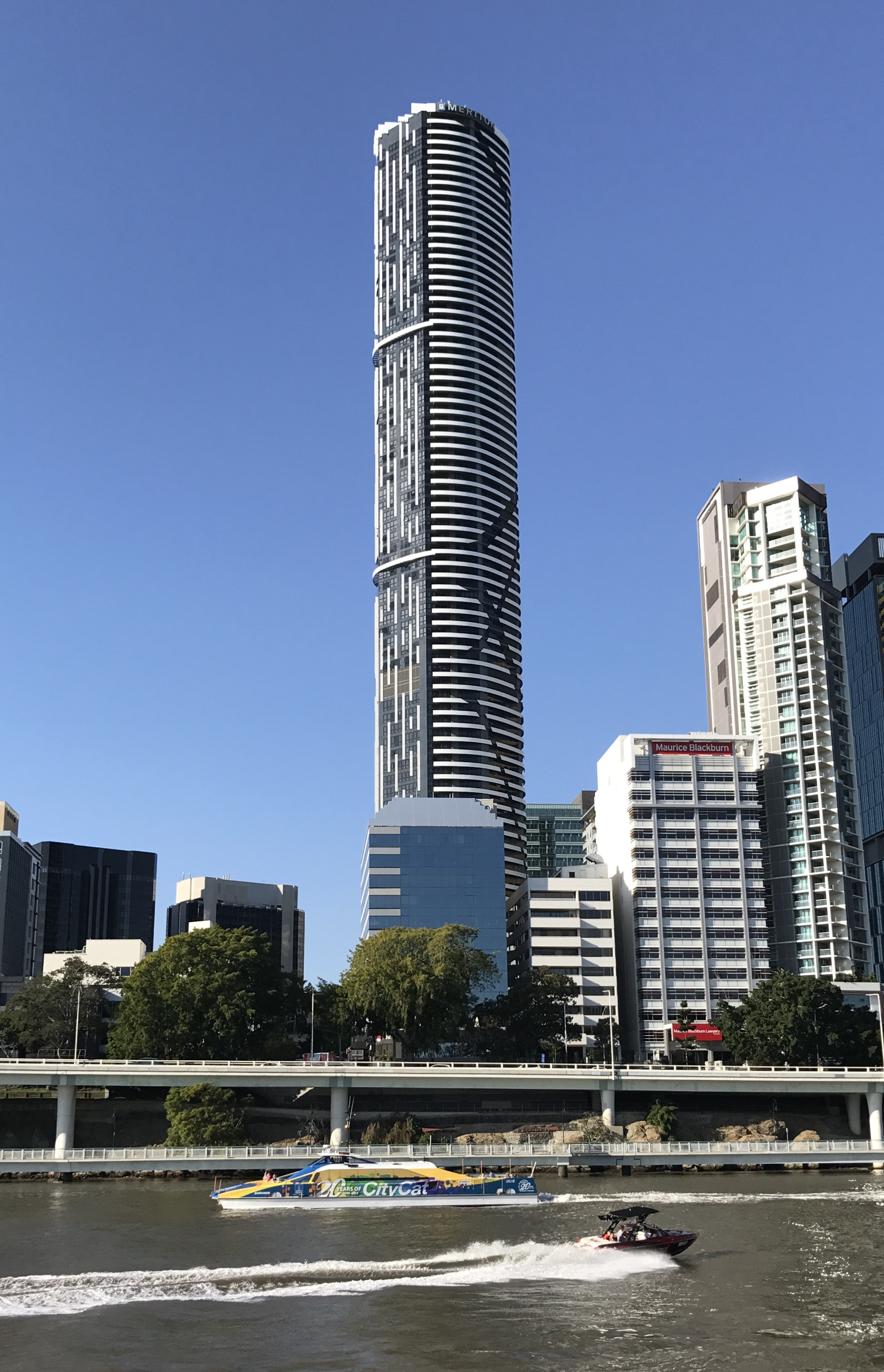
Infinity Tower in Brisbane

World Tower in Sydney, opened by Prime Minister John Howard, was completed in 2004 and is Sydney's tallest residential building.

The Soleil site in Adelaide Street was the company's first project in Brisbane. The initial design was rejected by the Brisbane City Council because of design and potential traffic issues. The revised design later won an International Property Award for the Best Residential High-Rise Development in Australia.

Infinity Tower on Herschel Street, Brisbane, was completed in 2014 and was Brisbane's tallest building from 2014 to 2016.

== Meriton Retail Precincts ==
Meriton has a total of 10 shopping centres known as Meriton Retail Precinct. The majority of the precincts have Woolworths and Coles supermarkets as anchor tenants.

=== List of shopping centres ===
==== New South Wales ====
- Bondi Junction
- Dee Why
- George Street (Sydney CBD)
- Mascot Central
- Parramatta (known as Dining Precinct)
- Waterloo
- Pagewood
- Liverpool

==== Queensland ====
- Sundale
- Surfers Paradise

== Awards ==
The company has received a number of awards.

- 2025 Asia Pacific Property Awards Best Mixed Use in Australia '180 George', Parramatta and 'The Retreat', Lidcombe NSW
- 2025 Urban Taskforce Development Excellence Awards Masterplanned Development 'The Retreat Masterplan', Lidcombe NSW
- 2025 Australian Institute of Building NSW Excellence in Building Awards in Residential Construction (>$60m) 'Uccello', Eastgardens NSW
- 2025 Australian Institute of Building NSW Excellence in Building Awards in Residential Construction (>$60m) 'Miro', Eastgardens NSW
- 2025 Australian Institute of Building NSW Excellence in Building Awards in Commercial Construction (>$60m) 'Meriton Suites', 180 George NSW
- 2024 HIA-COLORBOND® steel 'Housing 100 Report' Australia's Number One Apartment Builder
- 2024 Urban Development Institute of Australia NSW Developer of the Year
- 2024 International Property Awards Best High Rise in Australia 'Ocean', Surfers Paradise, QLD
- 2024 Urban Taskforce Development Excellence Awards Best High-Rise Residential Development 'Ocean', Surfers Paradise, QLD
- 2023 HIA-COLORBOND® steel 'Housing 100 Report' Australia's Number One Apartment Builder
- 2021 Australian Institute of Building NSW Excellence in Building Awards in Residential Construction (>$60m) 'Lighthouse', Dee Why NSW
- 2021 Urban Taskforce Development Excellence Award for Best Mixed Use Development 'Spectrum', Mascot NSW
- 2020 Property Council of Australia Best Mixed Use Development of the year for 'Lighthouse', Dee Why NSW
- 2018 Urban Taskforce Development Excellence Award Development of the year for 'Altitude', Parramatta NSW
- 2016 Urban Taskforce Development Excellence Award for Best Mixed Use Development 'Mascot Central', Mascot NSW
- 2015 Urban Taskforce Development Excellence Award for Best Master Planned Community Awarded to ‘Epping Park’, Epping Park, NSW
- 2015 Property Council of Australia Innovation & Excellence Award for Best Residential Development Awarded to ‘VSQ North’, Zetland, NSW
- 2014 HIA-CSR NSW Housing Award for Best Apartment Complex over 10 storeys Awarded to ‘VSQ North’, Zetland, NSW
- 2014 HIA-Colorbond steel ‘Housing 100 Report’ – Australia's Number One Home Builder
- 2014 Urban Taskforce Development Excellence Award for High-Density Residential Development Awarded for ‘Infinity’, Herschel Street, Brisbane central business district
- 2014 Property Council of Australia Awards for Best Residential High Rise in Australia Awarded for Soleil, Adelaide Street, Brisbane
- 2014 NSW Architecture Awards for Residential Architecture Multiple Housing Commendation Awarded for Imperial, Campbell Street, Sydney central business district
- International Property Awards 2013–2014 – Winner, Best Residential High Rise Development in Australia for Soleil on Adelaide Street.
- Urban Taskforce Residential Development Awards 2013 Winner – Residential Development Award for Soleil on Adelaide Street.
- 2012 HIA-CSR Award for Apartment Project 10 Storeys and Over, awarded for ‘Imperial', Haymarket, NSW
- 2011 Urban Taskforce Development Excellence Award for Residential Apartments, awarded for 'Portia', Southport, Qld
- 2009 Urban Taskforce Development Excellence Award for Affordable Housing
- 2009 National Trust's Energy Australia Heritage Award for Conservation of Built Heritage, awarded for 'Crown Square', Waterloo, NSW
- 2003 Best New Building by The Sydney Magazine Readers Poll, awarded for World Tower, Sydney, NSW
- 2002 HIA Award for Australia's Number 1 Homebuilder
- 1998 Master Builders Association Award for Housing Contributions
- 1995 Master Builders Association Award for Excellence in Housing
- 1992 Master Builders Association Award for Excellence in Housing
- 1990 HIA Award for Top Homes
