= Shorashim (organization) =

Shorashim (Hebrew: שָׁרָשִׁים, שורשים, lit. Roots) is a nonprofit organization devoted to building bridges between Israeli and North American Jews. The organization offer trips to Israel and Israel cultural programming in the United States.

The Jewish educational concept of mifgash (Hebrew: מפגש lit. Meeting or Encounter) – between Jews in Israel and around the world – is a foundation of Shorashim programs. The organization, and its founder Anne Lanski, are considered pioneers in this educational tool.

A provider of Taglit-Birthright Israel programs, Shorashim is differentiated as one of few providers that engages Israeli participants for the full ten-day program. Shorashim also offers a summer travel program for American and Israeli high school students, and Israel cultural programs for children and teens through its Club Israel program.

Shorashim emerged from a community-based Israel program known as CCP (the Chicago Community Project). Founders Anne Lanski and Yossi Nameri, were together staff members of the program in the early 1980s and together went on to form Shorashim in order to make mifgash the core component of the Israel travel program.

Anne Lanski is currently the executive director of the iCenter, an Israel Education initiative. Udi Krauss (an Israeli alum of Shorashim) is Shorashim's Director of Education in Israel. The current executive director of Shorashim is Michal Tamim.

Shorashim is a non-profit corporation in the United States and an amutah (Hebrew: עמותה lit: Non-Profit Organization) in Israel, operating as Shorashim Tochniot Mifgash.
