= University of Melbourne =

Public university in Melbourne, Australia

The University of Melbourne
- Coat of arms (Note: The brand logo is based on the current coat of arms used on parchments.)
- Latin: Universitas Melburniensis
- Other name: Melbourne University
- Motto: Latin: Postera Crescam Laude
- Motto in English: "I shall grow in the esteem of future generations"
- Type: Public research university
- Established: 22 January 1853; 173 years ago
- Accreditation: TEQSA
- Academic affiliations: Group of Eight; U21; APRU; ACU; AOTULE; CILECT; MISA
- Endowment: AU$1.445 billion (2024)
- Chancellor: Jane Hansen
- Vice-Chancellor: Carolyn Evans
- Academic staff: 5,731 (FTE, 2025)
- Administrative staff: 5,411 (FTE, 2025)
- Total staff: 11,142 (FTE, 2025)
- Students: 58,142 (EFTSL, 2025)
- Undergraduates: 29,308 (EFTSL, 2025)
- Postgraduates: 24,941 coursework (EFTSL, 2025); 3,893 research (EFTSL, 2025)
- Location: Melbourne, Victoria, Australia; 37.7963°S 144.9614°E
- Campus: Urban and regional with multiple sites 35.2 hectares (0.35 km^{2}) (Parkville Campus) 2,507 hectares (25.1 km^{2}) (Total)
- Colours: Traditional Heritage; Heritage Dark (Note: The exact shades are darker but difficult to distinguish on Wikipedia.)
- Sporting affiliations: UniSport; EAEN; UBL
- Mascot: Barry the Bear
- Website: unimelb.edu.au

The University of Melbourne (UniMelb) is a public research university located in Melbourne, Australia. Founded in 1853, it is Australia's second oldest university and the oldest in the state of Victoria. Its main campus is located in Parkville, an inner suburb north of Melbourne's central business district, with several other campuses located across the state of Victoria.

Incorporated in the 19th century by the colony of Victoria, the University of Melbourne is one of Australia's six sandstone universities and a member of the Group of Eight, Universitas 21, Washington University's McDonnell International Scholars Academy, and the Association of Pacific Rim Universities. Since 1872, many independent residential colleges have become affiliated with the university, providing accommodation for students and faculty, and academic, sporting and cultural programs. There are nine colleges and five university-owned halls of residence located on the main campus and in nearby suburbs.

The University of Melbourne's faculty, researchers, and alumni include ten Nobel Prize laureates, one Dan David Prize winner, four Australian prime ministers, and five governors-general, the most of any Australian university. The university comprises ten separate academic units and is associated with numerous institutes and research centres, including the Walter and Eliza Hall Institute of Medical Research, Florey Institute of Neuroscience and Mental Health, the Melbourne Institute of Applied Economic and Social Research and the Grattan Institute. The university has fifteen graduate schools, including the Melbourne Business School, the Melbourne Law School, the Melbourne Veterinary School, and the Melbourne Medical School.

== History ==
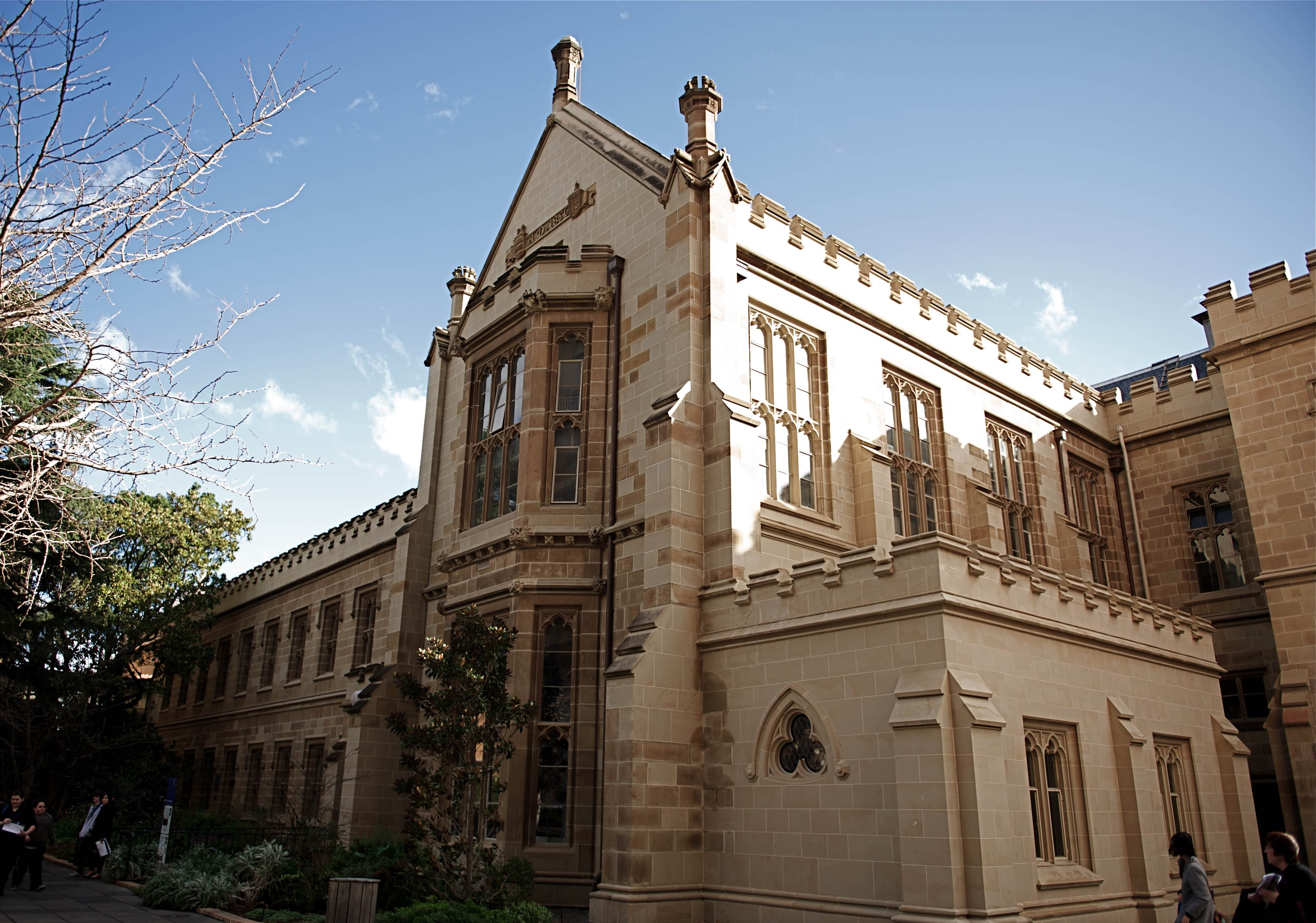
Old Quad, the original building of the University of Melbourne

=== Foundations of the university ===
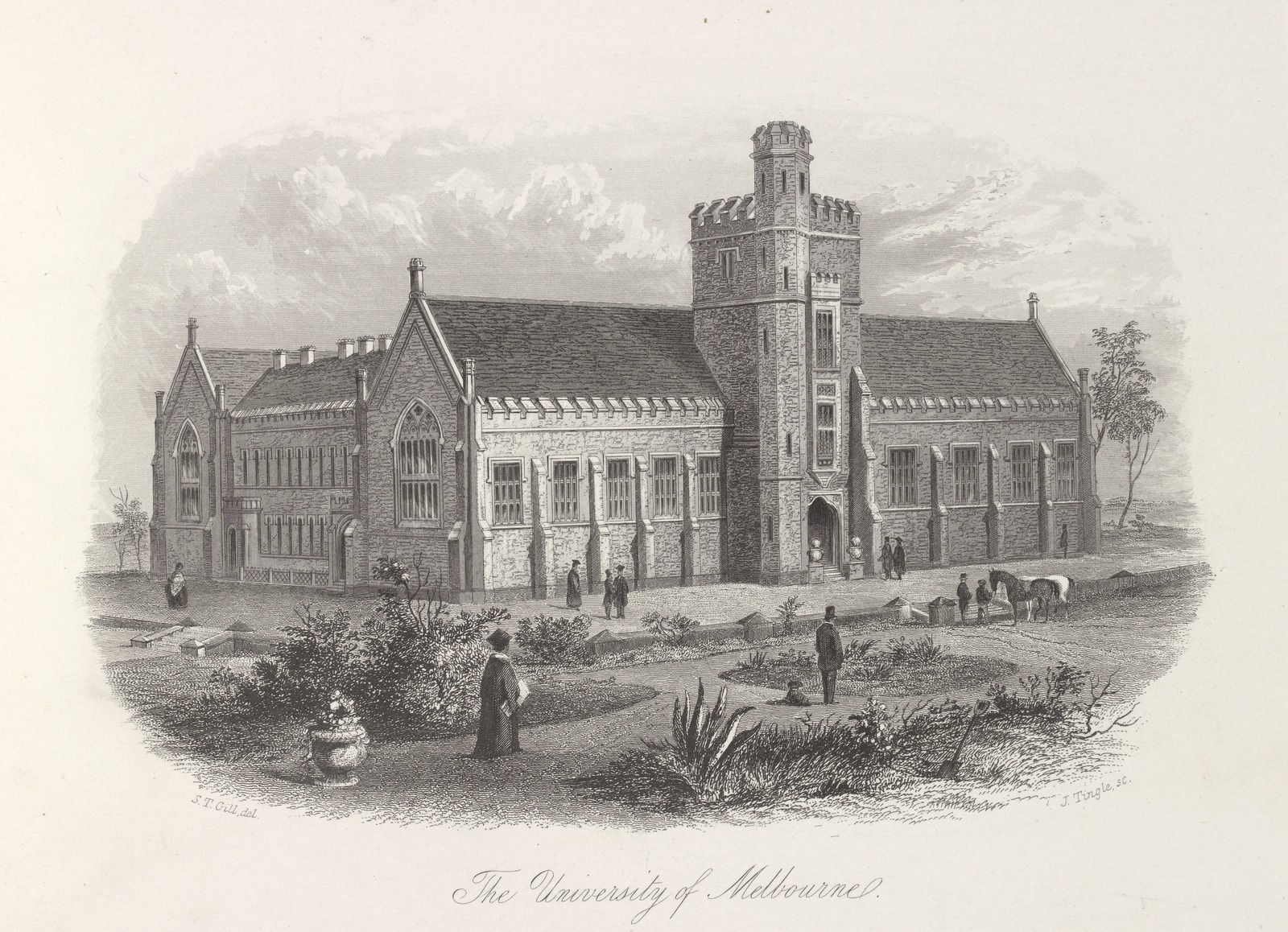
The original University of Melbourne building, 1857, Victoria Illustrated collection, State Library Victoria.

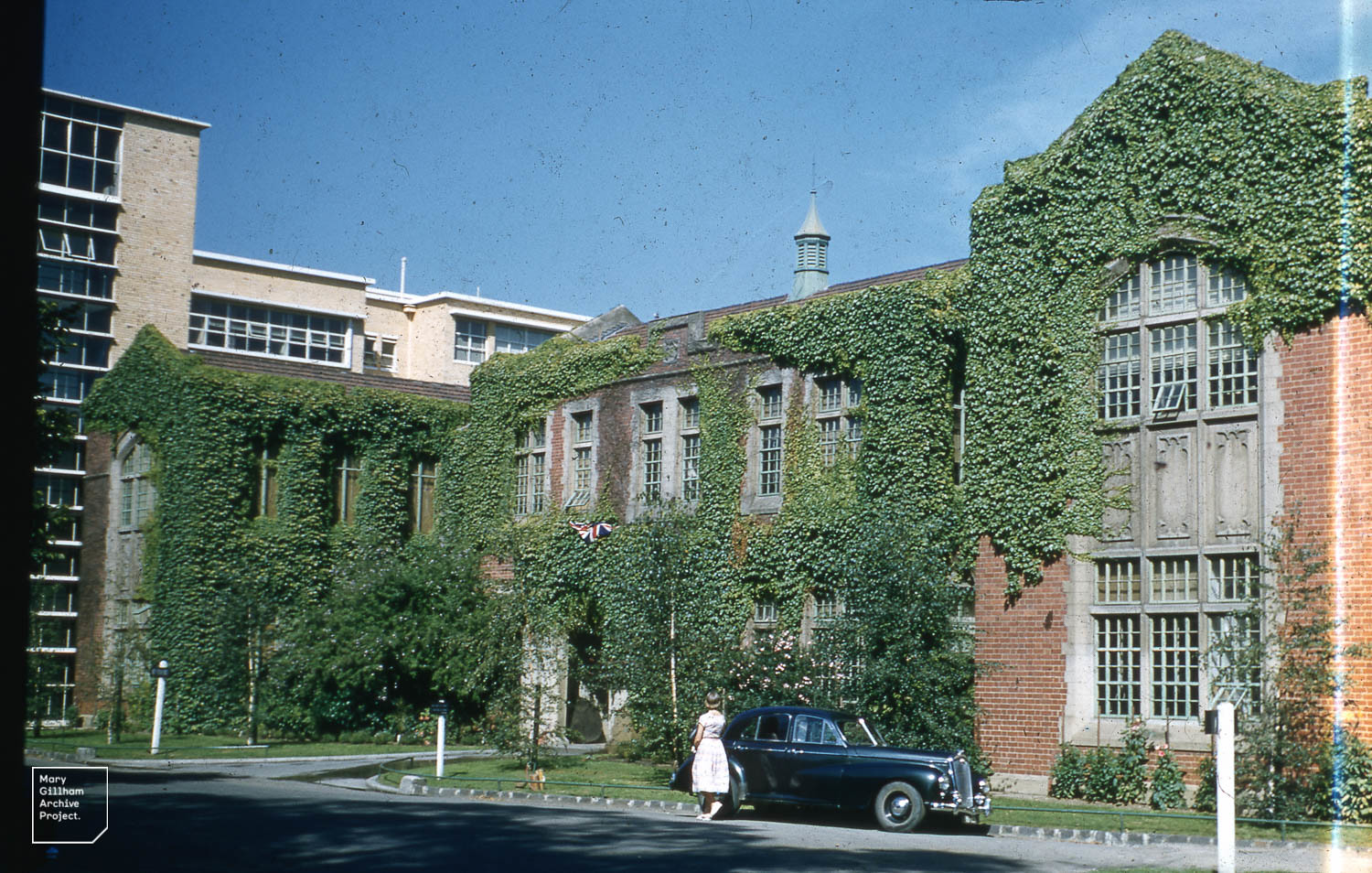
University of Melbourne Botany School in 1958.

The University of Melbourne was established following a proposal by the Hugh Childers, the Auditor-General and Finance Minister, in his first Budget Speech on 4 November 1852, who set aside a sum of £10,000 for the establishment of a university. The university was established by an act of the Parliament of Victoria (16 Vict. No. 34) on 22 January 1853, with power to confer degrees in arts, medicine, laws and music. The act provided for an annual endowment of £9,001, while a special grant of £20,000 was made for buildings that year. The foundation stone was laid on 3 July 1854, and on the same day the foundation stone for the State Library. Classes commenced in 1855 with three professors, all of whom, like the founding University Chancellor, Redmond Barry, were from Ireland. There were sixteen students; of this body of students only four graduated. The original buildings were officially opened by the Lieutenant Governor of the Colony of Victoria, Sir Charles Hotham, on 3 October 1855.

A law school was established in 1857 at the Parkville campus, following which a Faculty of Engineering and School of Medicine were established in 1861 and 1862 respectively. The university's residential colleges were first opened on the northern aspect of the campus in 1872, divided between the four main Christian denominations.

The first chancellor, Redmond Barry (later Sir Redmond), held the position until his death in 1880. The inauguration of the university was made possible by the wealth resulting from Victoria's gold rush. The institution was designed to be a "civilising influence" at a time of rapid settlement and commercial growth. In 1881, the admission of women was seen as a victory over the more conservative ruling council. Julia 'Bella' Guerin graduated with a Bachelor of Arts in 1883, and became the first woman to graduate from an Australian University.

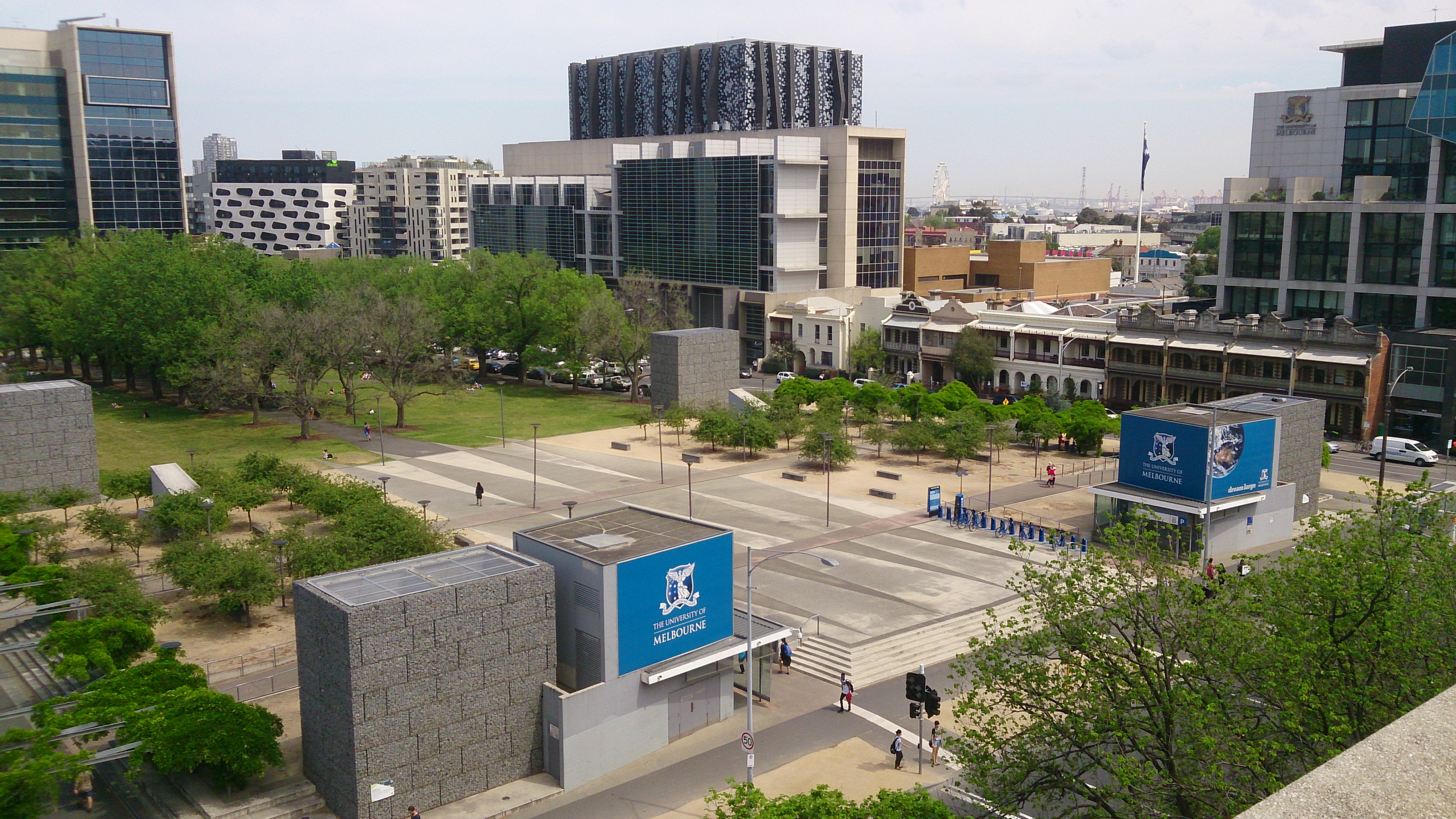
The view of the Melbourne Law School, Business and Economics, The Spot and Alan Gilbert Building.

=== 1900s – 1970s ===
Early in the 1900s, the university expanded its offerings to more utilitarian courses. In 1901 the number of students enrolled at the University of Melbourne exceeded 500 students for the first time. The university established the Diploma of Education in 1903, following negotiations with the Victorian Education Department.

Despite the economic depression of the 1890s and the discovery of a significant fraud by a university registrar in 1901, the university continued to expand during this period. This growth included the construction of several buildings between 1900 and 1906. Such growth was facilitated largely through an increased government funding allocation, and the coinciding university led funding campaign. To accompany the training dentists received by the Melbourne Dental Hospital, a School of Dentistry was established to teach the scientific basis of dentistry at the university. Agriculture was established in 1911 following the appointment of the State Director of Agriculture as the first professor. During this period the university became a notable site for research, emerging as a leader in Australia. Following World War II the demand for higher education increased rapidly, and as a result became a transformative period for the university.

In 1940, the first issue of Historical Studies: Australia and New Zealand, now Australian Historical Studies, was published by the Department of History.

=== 1980s – 2000s: Consolidation, expansion and the Melbourne Model ===
Expansion of the university increased significantly during the 1980s and 1990s, as the university amalgamated with a number of tertiary colleges. In 1988 the Melbourne Teachers' College was brought into the Faculty of Education, and the amalgamation lead to the formation of a distinctly new Faculty of Education. The College of Advanced Education was incorporated into the university in 1989. During this period, more students than ever before were attending the university. The university had expanded its student population to beyond 35,000 students. Such amalgamations continued into the 1990s, with the Victorian College of the Arts affiliation with the University of Melbourne in 1992. This increased the number of campuses for the University of Melbourne.

In 2001, the Melbourne School of Population Health was established, the first of its kind in Australia, and continued the growth of the university. Work at the centre involved contributions from many disciplines, ranging from the social sciences to epidemiology. Health fields such as Indigenous, women's, mental, sexual, and rural health have all been researched at the centre.

In 2008, Vice Chancellor Glyn Davis introduced a major restructure of the university's curriculum. The new structure, named the Melbourne Model, replaced traditional undergraduate specialist degrees with a two-degree undergraduate/graduate structure. Over 100 undergraduate degrees were replaced with six generalist degrees, with students taking a general bachelor's degree before specialising in either a professional or research graduate course. The introduction of the model, influenced by North American academia and the Bologna process, was controversial among students and staff. Various groups, including trade and student unions, academics, and some students criticised the introduction of the new structure, citing job and subject cuts, and a risk of "dumbing down" content. A group of students produced a satirical musical about the model's adoption. A dean from Monash University rejected the model and argued it led to a reduction in student applications to the University of Melbourne. The University of Western Australia is the only other Australian university to adopt the structure. Davis also introduced reforms to university governance, making faculty deans more responsible for producing a financial surplus.

=== 2010s: Further restructures and Davis' final term ===
Between 2013 and 2015 Davis introduced a wide-reaching restructure of the university's administration, labelled the Business Improvement Program, which led to the sacking of 500 administrative staff and some administrative responsibilities being transferred to academic staff. At the same time in the ten years to 2018 the university embarked on a large capital works program, spending $2 billion on new buildings across the university's campuses. The Melbourne School of Land and Environment was disestablished on 1 January 2015. Its agriculture and food systems department moved alongside veterinary science to form the Faculty of Veterinary and Agricultural Sciences, while other areas of study, including horticulture, forestry, geography and resource management, moved to the Faculty of Science in two new departments. In 2019, allegations of a toxic workplace culture within the Faculty of Arts were aired, with a number of senior staff leaving their positions. At the same time, there was controversy over the high salaries earned by the Vice Chancellor, with Davis earning $1.5 million in 2019, the most of any university head in Australia.

Like other Australian universities, an extraordinary growth in international students took place at the University of Melbourne and meant the university became increasingly reliant on revenue from its overseas student cohort.

Davis would finish his final term as Vice-Chancellor in 2018 with Duncan Maskell succeeding him on 1 October.

=== 2020 – 2023: COVID-19 impacts, further expansion plans and workforce tensions ===
In 2020, on-campus teaching was limited to selected clinical placements as a result of social distancing restrictions required by the Victorian State Government in response to the COVID-19 pandemic. The majority of teaching was moved to online delivery during the first semester. Like many other institutions and workplaces, university faculty members elected to use telecommunication platforms such as Zoom Video Communications, Microsoft Teams, or Skype to conduct live tutorials and provide interactive online learning experiences as a result of the suspension of face-to-face teaching during this time period.

In 2020 the university announced it was axing 450 staff in the institution's largest ever layoff of academic staff, despite a planned expenditure of $4.2 billion for capital works over the decade from 2020. Similarly, in semester two of 2021, the majority of teaching was once again moved to online delivery due to the outbreak of the Delta variant of COVID-19 and ensuing lockdowns in Victoria. In response the university announced further job losses, despite the university running an $8m surplus in 2020. Eleven subjects were cut as part of the savings measures including a number of specialist scientific subjects, a move criticised by Nobel Laureate Peter Doherty and others. The halting of international student arrivals as part of the Australian pandemic response was projected to cause a major loss in revenue for the university.

In 2019 and 2020, the university was also involved in wage theft and underpayment controversies towards its large teaching workforce of casual staff, and began repaying casual tutors for unpaid marking. The university was accused of owing Faculty of Arts teaching staff an estimated $6 million. In 2021 the Vice-Chancellor issued an apology for systematically underpaying staff, saying there was “a systemic failure of respect from this institution" towards casual staff that resulted in underpaying 1,000 staff members and requiring the university to pay back $9.5 million. This followed a campaign by the National Tertiary Education Union's University of Melbourne Casuals Branch, which engaged in a series of protests, including one outside the Vice Chancellor's residence. The university came under sustained criticism over the poor employment and financial conditions of its highly casualised academic workforce. During the 2010s, the university increasingly casualised its workforce, with reports that between 47 and 72 per cent of its 11,000 employees were on casual contracts by 2023.

In 2021 the State Government granted planning approval for a new campus for the university at the urban renewal precinct Fishermans Bend. The $2 billion campus, planned to open in 2026, will focus on engineering and forms part of a large capital works program by the university, which included the demolition of the Student Union Building and the creation of a new student precinct on the south-east corner of the Parkville campus.

In June 2021, a new speech policy was implemented with the stated purpose of protecting transgender individuals within the university while preserving freedom of speech principles for staff and students. In 2023, windows of the university's Sidney Myer Asia Centre Building were broken and the building was graffitied with a message accusing the university of contributing to an unsafe environment for transgender individuals.

In August 2023, all National Tertiary Education Union members who work in the Faculty of Arts, Melbourne Law School, the Victorian College of the Arts School of Art, student services, stagecraft and the library will start a-five to seven day strike. Union members are seeking a 15% increase in wages over the course of 3 years.

=== 2024 – present: Student occupations and conclusion of Maskell's tenure ===
On 24 April 2024, students occupied the South Lawn of Parkville campus in solidarity with international, grass-roots, student-lead pro-Palestine movements. Concerns arose as students sought to keep the university accountable in its investments. More specifically, to disclose research and investment ties with Israeli Government companies, stocks, or bonds benefiting from the occupation of Palestine and the Gaza humanitarian crisis since 7 October 2023. Students occupied the Arts West building, "renaming" it Mahmoud's hall after a Palestinian student who was expected to commence his studies at the university died in the Gaza war.

On 29 April 2024, it was announced that Vice-Chancellor Maskell would step down from his position, partway through his second term, by early 2025.

Despite student efforts to comply with university policies while exercising their right to protest, on 14 May the university issued a breach notice, warning students of potential expulsions and faculty of disciplinary actions if protest activities continued. The notice also referenced the possibility of state law enforcement involvement, though no intervention occurred as the protests remained peaceful.

On the evening of 22 May, University of Melbourne for Palestine representatives announced that an agreement had been made with the university administration to disband encampments in exchange for disclosure of endowment investments and research ties with weapons manufacturers. However, as of 23 May, protesters and the university are at a stalemate, citing a lack of correspondence from the latter, with encampments remaining in place.

The university became subject to an investigation by the Office of the Victorian Information Commissioner into whether it breached privacy laws by using surveillance technology to identify students who participated in the protests. The Victorian Information Commissioner found that the university had breached student privacy by using the location data of students connected to the university's internet network to identify those involved in the Gaza war protests in May 2024. The university had used the data in disciplinary hearings against the students.

On 30 September 2024, it was announced that Emma Johnston would be appointed the university's next Vice-Chancellor, succeeding Maskell. Johnston was the first woman to hold the position in the university's history.

== Campuses and buildings ==
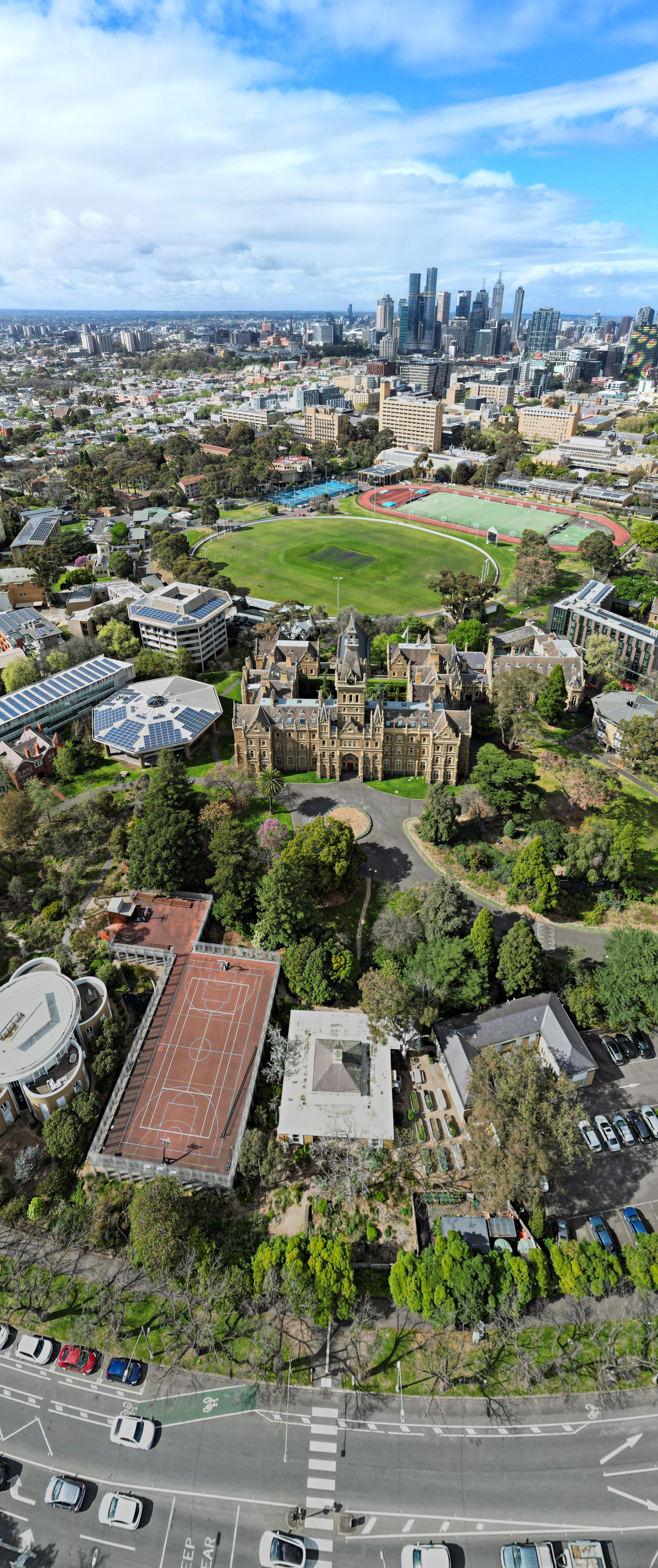
Vertical panorama of University of Melbourne, September 2023

Old Arts Building in Parkville Campus of University of Melbourne

University of Melbourne, archway at Old Quad

The university's original and main campus is the Parkville campus, which was established in 1853. The campus contains both historical and award-winning modern architectural buildings. The Parkville campus is located within walking distance of central Melbourne. The university also hosts other campuses in metropolitan Melbourne at Burnley, Victoria, Southbank, and Werribee. The Burnley campus is where horticultural courses are taught. Performing arts, visual arts, film and television, and music courses are taught at the Southbank campus. Veterinary science is taught at the Werribee campus.

In regional Victoria, the Creswick and Dookie campuses are used for forestry and agriculture courses respectively. They previously housed several hundred residential students, but are now largely used for short courses and research. The Shepparton campus is home to the Rural Health Academic Centre for the Faculty of Medicine, Dentistry and Health Sciences.

The university is a part-owner of the Melbourne Business School, based at Parkville campus, which ranked 46th in the 2012 Financial Times global rankings.

A new campus located in Fishermans Bend is currently under planning, and construction may commence 2026. It will be used by the Faculty of Engineering and Information Technology (FEIT) and the Faculty of Architecture, Building and Planning (ABP).

=== Parkville ===
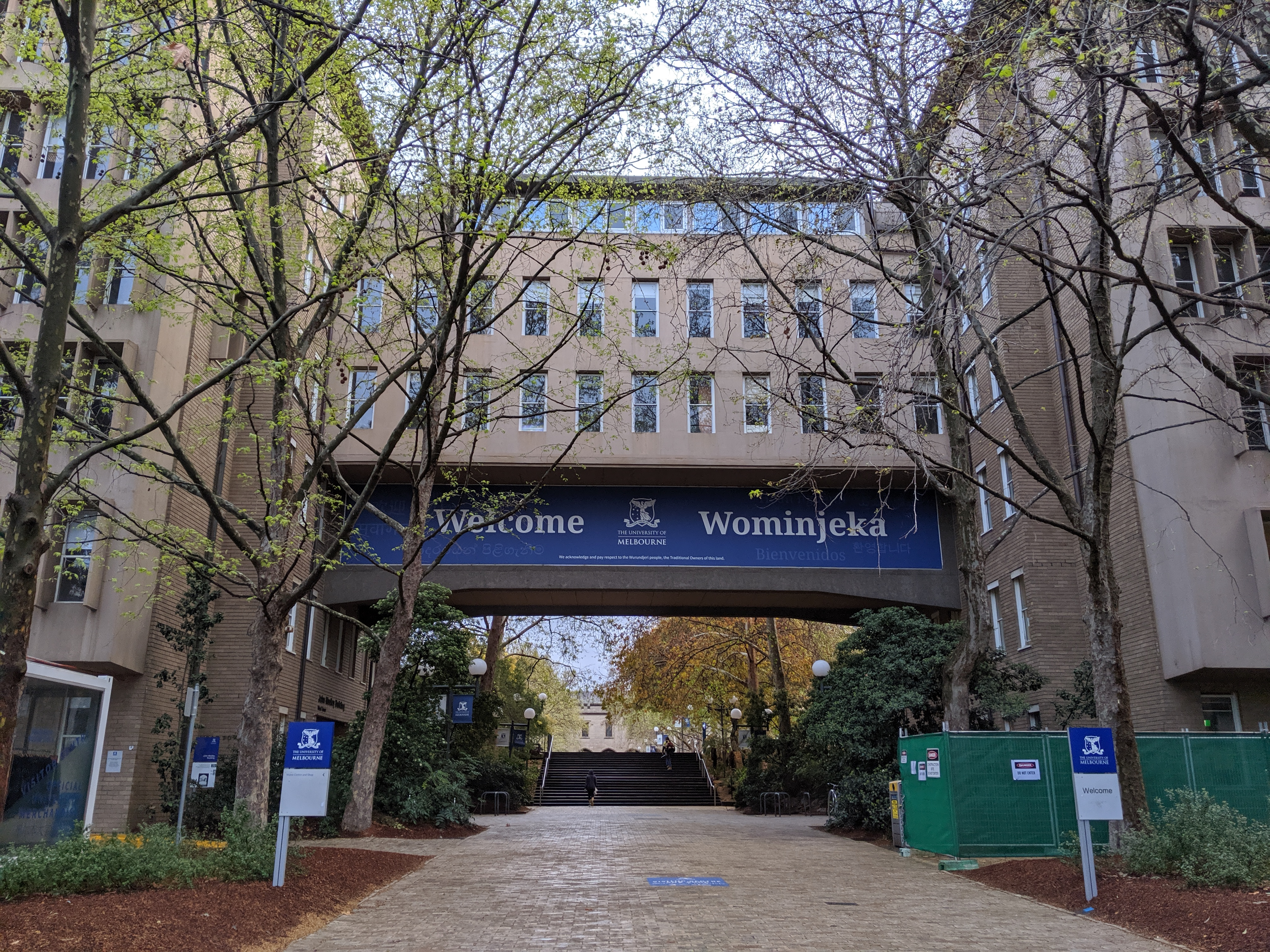
Main entrance (Gate 10) to Parkville Campus of the University of Melbourne from Grattan Street

The Parkville campus is the primary campus of the university. Originally established in a large area north of Grattan Street in Parkville, the campus has expanded well beyond its boundaries, with many of its newly acquired buildings located in the nearby suburb of Carlton. The university is undertaking an "ambitious infrastructure program" to reshape campuses. The campus was founded in 1853, and is located just north of Melbourne's central business district. There is a diverse range of cafés, two gyms, five university libraries, a bank branch, Australia Post parcel lockers, a bike shop, a boutique supermarket and a small pharmacy located on the Parkville campus. The campus is located within a broader knowledge precinct, which encompasses eight hospitals, and many other leading research institutes.

Several of the earliest campus buildings, such as the Old Quad and Baldwin Spencer buildings, feature period architecture in a Gothic revival style. The Old Quadrangle underwent extensive restoration in 2019 to return to elements of the original design, including a dedicated temporary exhibition space in the Treasury Gallery. The new Wilson Hall replaced the original Gothic Revival building which was destroyed by fire.

Recipients of the University of Melbourne Award (see below) are acknowledged by bronze commemorative plaques along Professors Walk on this campus.

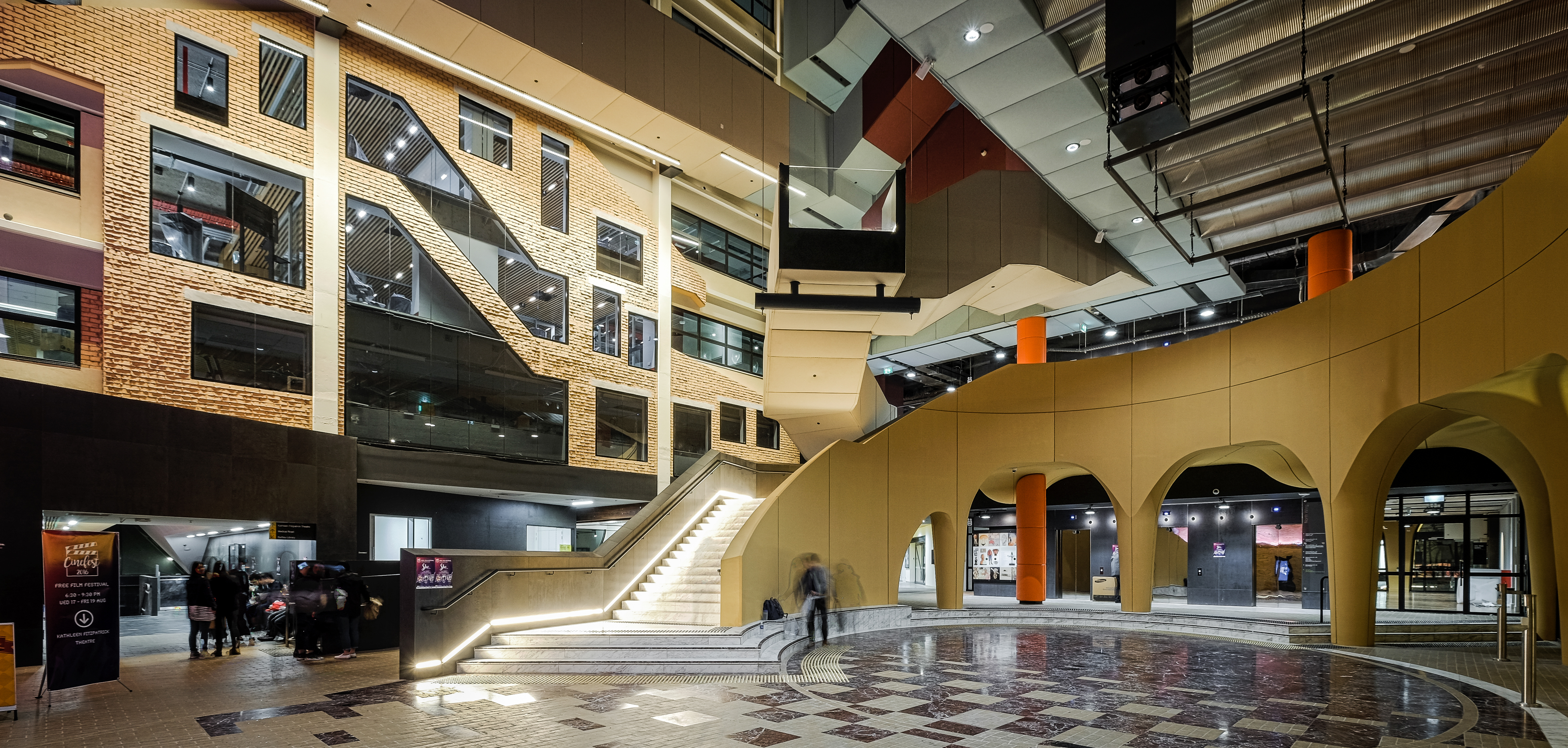
Arts West Building, University of Melbourne on the main Parkville campus.

The Parkville campus was used extensively to shoot interior and exterior scenes in the MIFF-funded The Death and Life of Otto Bloom starring Twilight actor Xavier Samuel and Golden Globe nominee Rachel Ward.

The new Union and Guild Theatres are located within the University of Melbourne Arts & Cultural Building, while Open Stage is in the 757 Swanston Street building, both on the Parkville campus.

As of 2025, the Parkville Campus is accessible via Parkville railway station, as part of the Metro Tunnel project.

=== Southbank ===
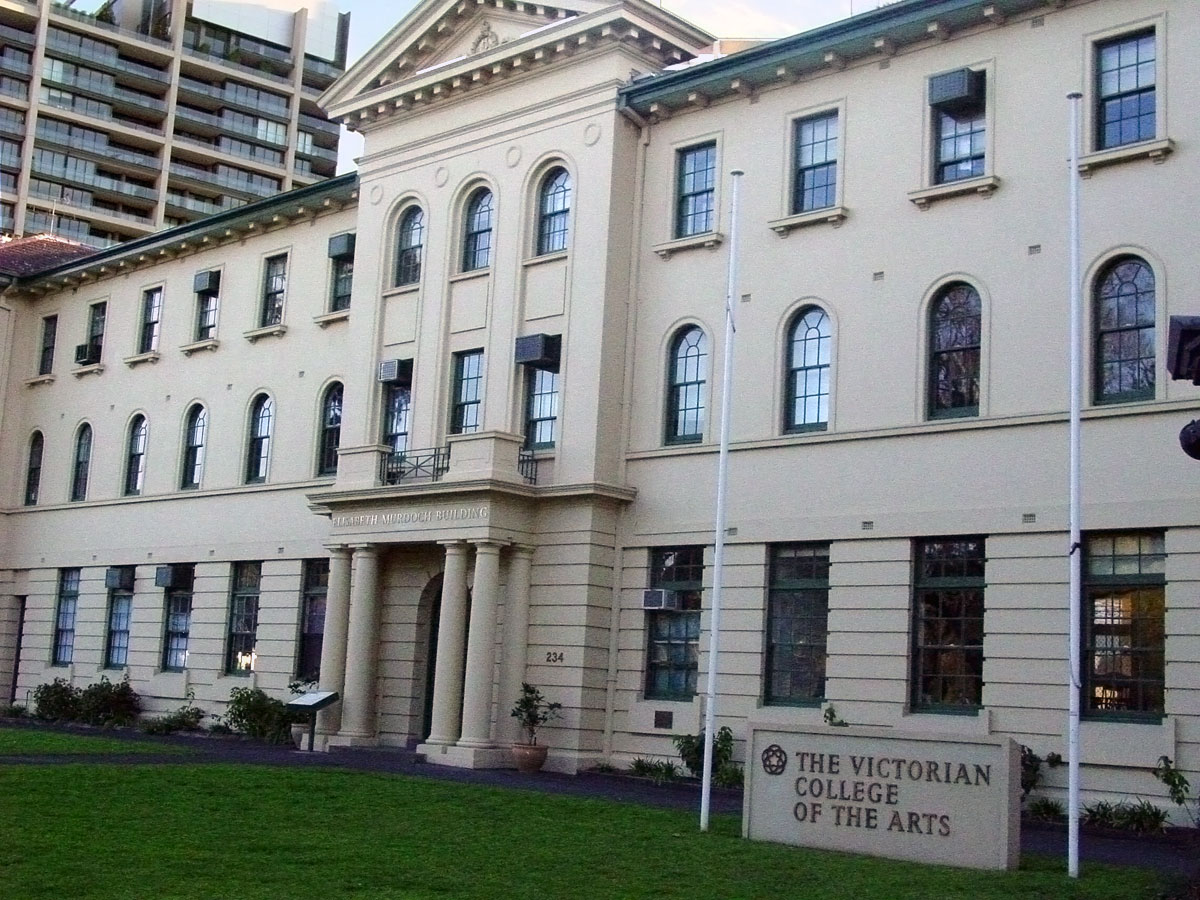
The Elisabeth Murdoch Building at the Victorian College of the Arts on St Kilda Road

The Southbank campus is home to the Victorian College of the Arts and the Melbourne Conservatorium of Music, and is situated within Melbourne's creative arts precinct. Theatre and dance stages, film and television studios, visual arts studios, and concert halls are all located at the university's purpose-built creative arts home.

A$200 million major capital works project at the campus was completed in 2019. The project includes the construction of a new state-of-the-art conservatorium for music and the conversion of historically important buildings for use as education and research facilities.

In 2011, the Victorian State Government allocated $24 million to support arts education at the VCA. This was due in part to it coming together with the Conservatorium to form the then Faculty of the Victorian College of the Arts and the Melbourne Conservatorium of Music.

=== Burnley ===
The Burnley campus is located within the suburb of Burnley in Melbourne, around 5 km east of the Melbourne CBD. The campus is dedicated to both ornamental and environmental horticulture, and is surrounded by nine hectares of heritage-listed gardens. The campus began operating as a learning precinct in horticultural education in 1891. At the campus, students are offered short courses, associate degrees, post-graduate studies, and research. Specifically, training for urban landscape management, landscape design and production, park management, turf management, nursery and cut flower production, and arboriculture are all specialisations of the campus.

=== Creswick ===
The Creswick campus is located within the township of Creswick, 120 km north-west of Melbourne. It is situated on 15 hectares of land, which is also connected to native and plantation forests. Accommodation is available at the campus to members of the University of Melbourne's student cohorts and teaching staff when engaged at Creswick. Creswick campus has been offering forest science education since 1910, and is Australia's only dedicated forest ecosystem science campus, which focuses on forest industry, conservation, and molecular biology research. Scientists based at the campus include hydrologists, soil scientists, plant geneticists, geomorphologists, fire scientists, ecologists, engineers, and mathematicians.

=== Dookie ===
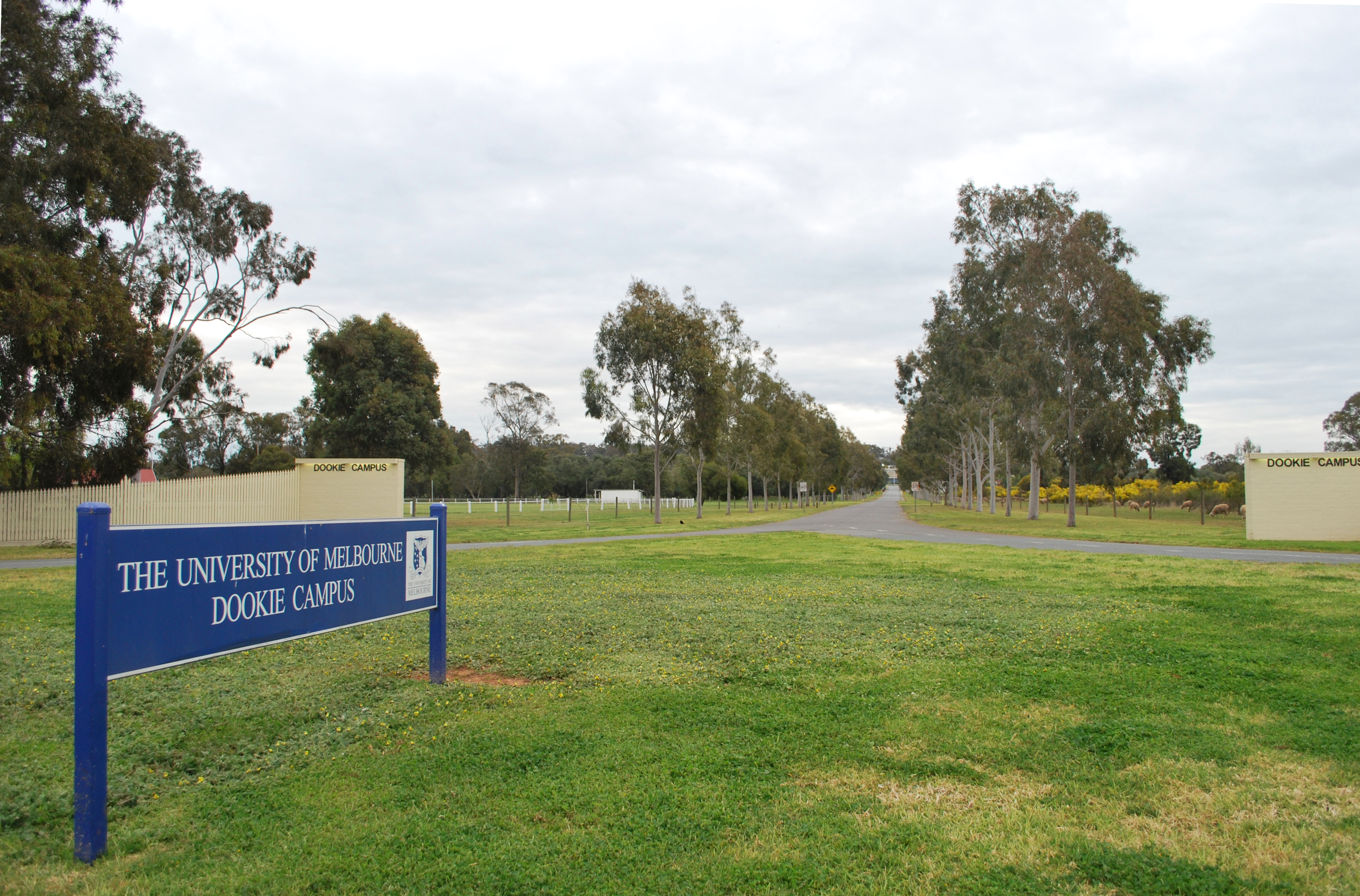
Entrance of Dookie Campus

The Dookie campus has been the university's rural home to agriculture and agricultural teaching and learning since its inception in 1886. It is based between Shepparton and Benalla, about 220 km north east of Melbourne. Dookie campus is situated on 2440 hectares of land that houses student and staff accommodation, an orchard, winery, merino sheep, robotic dairy, and a natural bush reserve. Agriculture students are able to access the city campus in addition to a semester at the Dookie campus. Subjects in agriculture, science, commerce and environments are available at the campus.

=== Shepparton ===
The Shepparton Medical Centre campus is located in Shepparton, nearly 200 km north of Melbourne. The campus is part of the Melbourne Medical School, and the Shepparton base is home to the Shepparton Rural Clinical School. It provides fully furnished, subsidized, self-catered student accommodation on site at the Clinical School. The University of Melbourne Shepparton Medical Centre was the first purpose-built teaching clinic in Australia, and services Shepparton and surrounds with comprehensive primary healthcare.

=== Werribee ===
The Werribee campus, located about 30 km south west of the city, is home to the Melbourne Veterinary School and hosts the final years of study in Victoria's only accredited veterinary course. In the late 2010s, the campus underwent an AU$63 million redevelopment to enhance facilities for pet treatment and the training of future veterinarians.

=== Fishermans Bend ===
A new engineering campus at Fishermans Bend is currently in the design phase. Construction was planned to begin in the mid-2020s, but in 2025, work was postponed for at least five years. The 7.2 hectare site, located in a renewal area set aside for industry and technology by the Victorian Government, will be used by the Faculty of Engineering and Information Technology (FEIT) and the Faculty of Architecture, Building and Planning (ABP).

=== Former campuses ===
The university had a number of former campuses. These included numerous agricultural campuses that were part of VCAH upon its merger with the university in 1997. When the university ceased offering vocational education (TAFE) courses in agriculture in the mid-2000s, most of these sites were transferred to TAFE providers. These included the two Western District campuses, Glenormiston (transferred to South West TAFE) and Longerenong (transferred to SkillInvest); the McMillan campuses in Gippsland; and the Werribee-based Gilbert Chandler campus. In 2024, the university sold its Hawthorn campus, which had not been used for some time, in order to fund the construction of Australian Institute for Infectious Disease.

== Governance and structure ==
=== University Council ===
Governance of the university is grounded in an act of parliament, the University of Melbourne Act 2009. The peak governing body is the "Council" the key responsibilities of which include appointing the vice-chancellor and principal, approving the strategic direction and annual budget, establishing operational policies and procedures and overseeing academic and commercial activities as well as risk management. The chair of the council is the "chancellor". The "academic board" oversees learning, teaching and research activities and provides advice to the council on these matters. The "committee of convocation" represents graduates and its members are elected in proportion to the number of graduates in each faculty.

The University of Melbourne's operations are governed through a hierarchy of delegations framework. A 13-member council is the university's governing body. It establishes the university's council, determines its core functions, and allows the university to enact subordinate legislation through statutes and regulations. Under legislative elements associated with the council, university policies exist as a formal statement of principle to regulate university operations. Under university policies, university processes exist to support workplace agreements, policy, and relevant legislation by noting day-to-day operation tasks and activities to be performed by staff.

==== Academic Board ====
The academic board is held responsible to the council for quality assurance in activities such as the maintenance of high standards in teaching, research and learning. The University of Melbourne Executive is the university's principal management committee. The university consists of academic and administrative structures. University leadership encompasses the chancellor, vice-chancellor and senior executives, who are responsible for the strategic vision of the university.

=== Faculties and departments ===
As of 2019, the University of Melbourne is divided into nine faculties, which encompass all major departments of both research and teaching, as follows:

- Faculty of Architecture, Building and Planning: Julie Willis
- Faculty of Arts: Russell Goulbourne
- Faculty of Business and Economics: Serge da Motta Veiga
- Faculty of Education: Marek Tesar
- Faculty of Engineering and Information Technology: Mark Cassidy
- Faculty of Fine Arts and Music: Marie Sierra
- Melbourne Law School: Matthew Harding
- Faculty of Medicine, Dentistry and Health Sciences: Jane Gunn
- Faculty of Science: Moira O'Bryan

==== Faculty of Arts ====
The arts faculty comprises five schools:

- Asia Institute, for studies in Asian languages and cultures
- School of Culture and Communication, including literary and cultural studies, art history and art curatorship, cinema and performance, media and communication, and Indigenous Australian studies
- School of Historical and Philosophical Studies, which includes programs in Classics and Archaeology, Cultural Materials Conservation, History, History and Philosophy of Science, Jewish Culture and Society and Philosophy
- School of Languages and Linguistics, which includes programs in European Studies
- School of Social and Political Sciences
- Graduate School of Humanities and Social Sciences

=== Finances and endowment ===
The University of Melbourne has an endowment of approximately $1.335 billion. The university's endowments recovered after hardship following the 2008 Great Recession, which shrank its investments by 22%. This required restructuring of the university, including cutting 220 full-time positions. A further round of cuts, driven by lingering concerns about finances and declining Federal contributions to the tertiary sector, took place under the "Business Improvement Program" from 2014 to 2016 and resulted in the cutting of 500 jobs.

Under former vice-chancellor Glyn Davis, the university publicly launched a fundraising campaign titled Believe in 2013. The campaign raised $500 million by 2016 and sought to raise a further $1 billion by 2021.

== Academic profile ==
=== Academic reputation ===
Ranking graphical summary of the University of Melbourne View source data.

University rankings

Global – Overall
- ARWU World: 37 (2026)
- CWTS World: 38 (Note: The CWTS Leiden Ranking is based on P (top 10%).) (2025)
- QS World: 22 (2026)
- QS Employability: 8 (2022)
- THE World: 34 (2027)
- THE Reputation: 47 (2025)
- USNWR Global: 28 (26/27)

National – Overall
- ARWU National: 1 (2026)
- CWTS National: 1 (2025)
- ERA National: 1 (2018)
- QS National: 2 (2027)
- THE National: 1 (2026)
- USNWR National: 1 (26/27)
- AFR National: 1 (2025)

Globally, the University of Melbourne is routinely ranked among the top 40 universities worldwide by independent ranking assessments. In the latest rankings, the University of Melbourne was ranked #22 by QS World University Rankings (2nd nationally), #34 by Times Higher Education World University Rankings (1st nationally), #37 by Academic Ranking of World Universities, (1st nationally) and #28 by U.S. News & World Report Best Global Universities (1st nationally). On average, the University of Melbourne ranked #23 globally, just behind the University of Toronto (#22) and ahead of the University of Michigan (#24).

In 2022 Academic Ranking of World Universities, the university attained a position of #32 globally (1st nationally) and in the CWTS Leiden Ranking 2018, the university attained a position of #28 globally (1st nationally). In the 2024 Aggregate Ranking of Top Universities, the university was ranked #23 globally (1st nationally). UniMelb was also ranked #40 (1st nationally) by MOUIR 2025 and #41 (1st nationally) by EduRank 2026.

Nationally, the University of Melbourne has consistently been ranked the best university in Australia, as reflected in the Australian Financial Review Best Universities Ranking, and the Excellence in Research for Australia National Ranking.

=== Research and publications ===
The University of Melbourne had $900 million in research income in 2025 and has research expenditure second only to that of the Commonwealth Scientific and Industrial Research Organisation (CSIRO). The university is a leading Australian research university, with the largest cohort of research students in Australia. Each year the university releases a Research Integrity Report for transparency in research integrity, concerns, training, and policy work to support responsible research conduct, including any research complaints lodged over the last year and responses.

The Performance Ranking of Scientific Papers for World Universities is released by National Taiwan University (NTU Ranking), and placed the University of Melbourne #17 internationally and #1 domestically in 2026. It evaluates the performance of scientific papers, and the indicators used are designed to compare both the quantity and quality of published scientific works by each university.

Similarly, the Center for World University Rankings (CWUR) ranks universities on variables, including both research output and citations. For the 2023 edition, it ranked the University of Melbourne at #57 in the world and #1 in Australia.

The university is connected to more than 100 research centres and institutes. In 2010 the university spent $813 million on research. In the same year the university had the highest numbers of federal government Australian Postgraduate Awards (APA) and International Postgraduate Research Scholarships (IPRS), as well as the largest totals of Research Higher Degree (RHD) student load (3,222 students) and RHD completions (715).

=== Teaching structure ===
The University of Melbourne differs from other Australian universities in its course structure, as it offers nine generalised three-year degrees instead of more traditional specialised undergraduate degrees. This system, described as the "Melbourne Model", was implemented in 2008 by then Vice-Chancellor Glyn Davis, the university having previously offered many single and joint undergraduate degrees. The university also offers postgraduate courses (including professional-entry master's degrees) that follow undergraduate courses with greater specialisation.

Several professional degrees are available only for graduate entry. These degrees are at a masters level according to the Australian Qualification Framework, but are named "masters" or "doctorate" following the practice in North America. The university's faculties often have a corresponding graduate school to offer these degrees.

=== Entrepreneurship ===
The university has an entrepreneurship arm, named the Melbourne Entrepreneurial Centre (MEC). The university also has an accelerator program for start-ups, which has produced a number of small companies. The university also has an entrepreneurial training centre called the Wade Institute of Entrepreneurship based at Ormond College, one of the university's residential colleges.

=== Libraries and collections ===
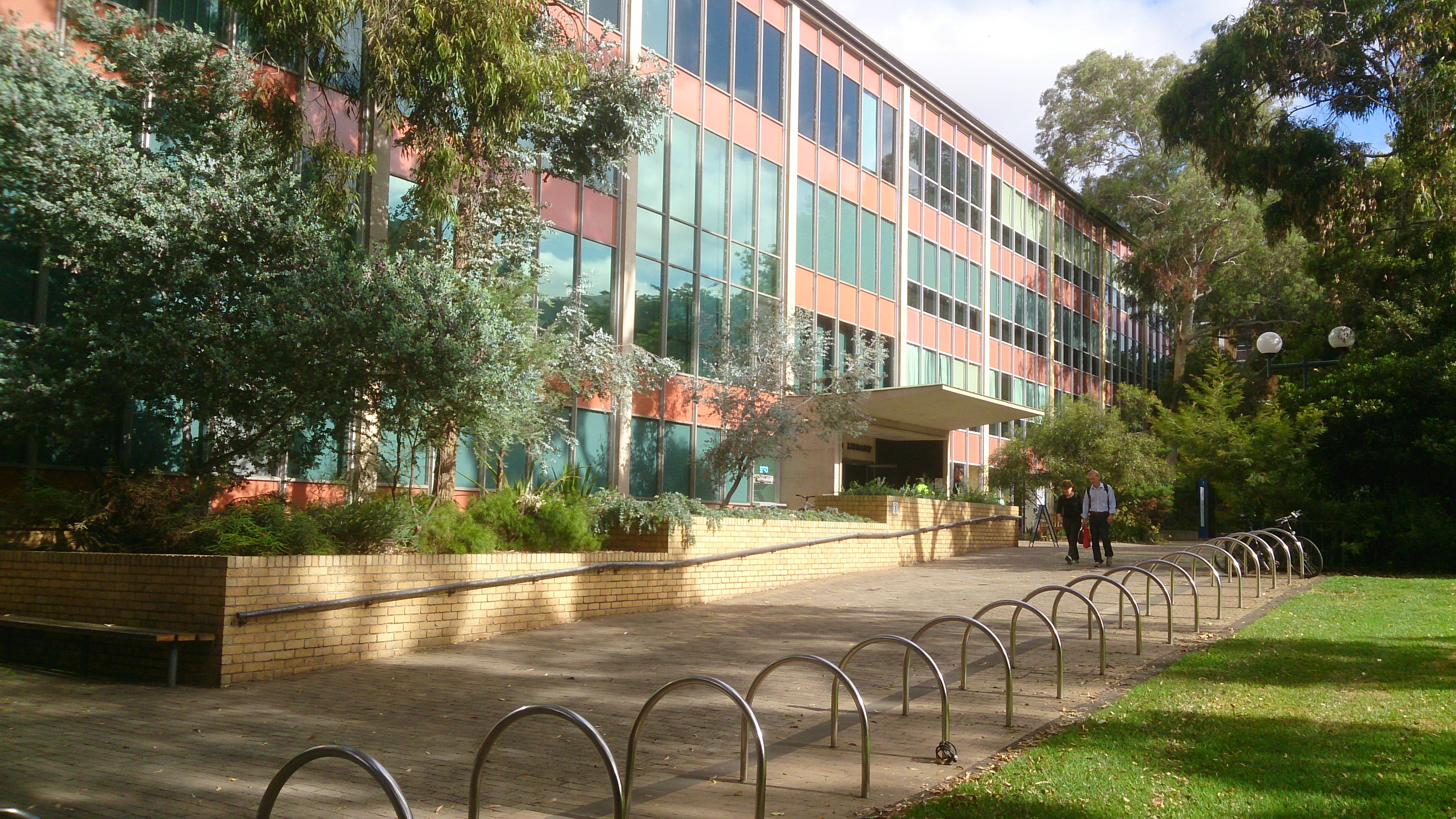
Baillieu Library, at the Parkville Campus

The University of Melbourne's libraries have over three million visitors performing 42 million loan transactions every year. The general collection comprises over 3.5 million items including books, DVDs, photographic slides, music scores and periodicals as well as rare maps, prints and other published materials. The library also holds over 32,000 e-books, hundreds of databases and 63,000 general and specialist journals in digital form.

The university has ten libraries spread across its campuses:

- ABP (Architecture, Building and Planning) Library
- Baillieu Library

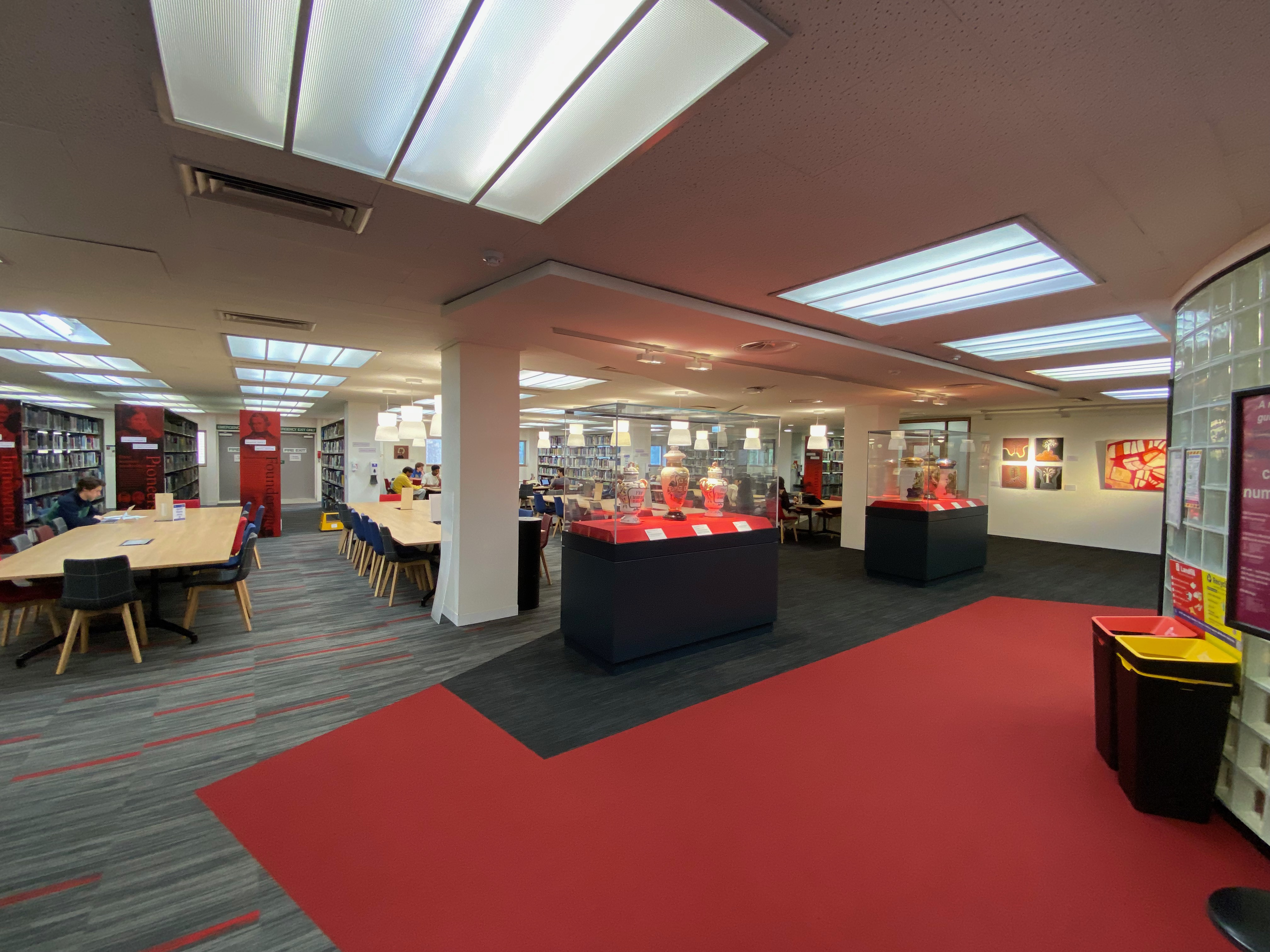
Inside the former Brownless Library

- Burnley, Creswick and Dookie Libraries
- ERC (Eastern Resource Centre) Library
- Giblin Eunson Library
- Law Library
- Southbank Library
- Veterinary and Agricultural Science Libraries

With the exception of the Baillieu and ERC libraries, most of the university's libraries have a subject focus. In addition to the study libraries, the Student Union runs a recreational library named the Rowden White Library in the Student Pavilion.

=== Museums and archives ===
==== Grainger Museum ====
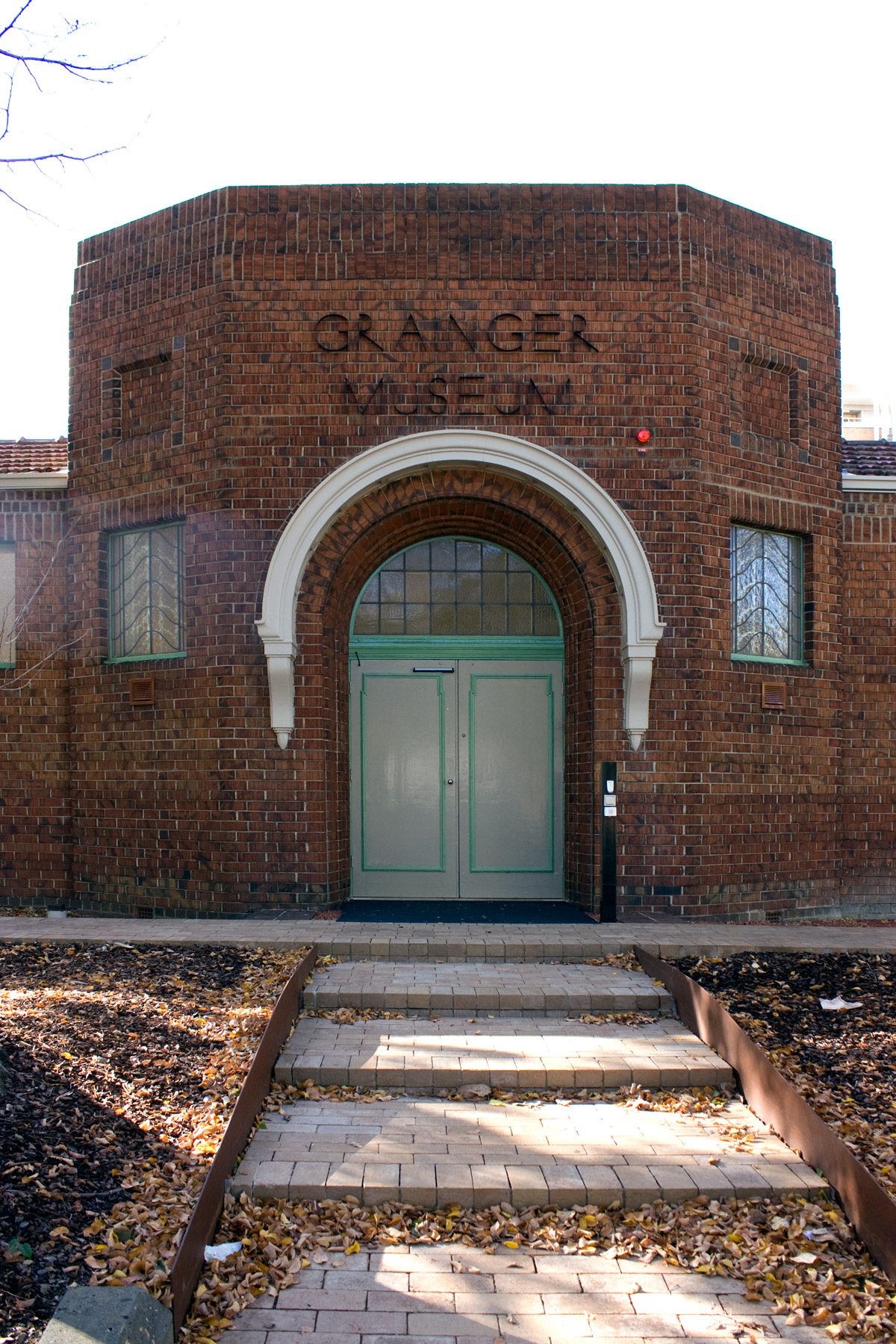
The Grainger Museum on Royal Parade.

The Grainger Museum is located at the university's Parkville campus, and is the only purpose built autobiographical museum in Australia. It is home to a diverse collection of over 100,000 items including photographs, costumes, art, music scores and instruments. The items were collected by Percy Grainger and span his life and career. Grainger was an eccentric and famous composer, arranger and pianist whose career played a prominent role in the revival of interest in British folk music in the early years of the 20th century.

==== Harry Brookes Allen Museum of Anatomy and Pathology ====
The Harry Brookes Allen Museum of Anatomy and Pathology, located at the Parkville campus, is one of Australia's largest collections of both historical anatomical models and real human tissue specimens. It provides students at The University of Melbourne educational resources for the medical and related anatomical disciplines. The museum is not normally open to the public, though tours of the museum are available for medical students and health professionals.

==== Henry Forman Atkinson Dental Museum ====
The Henry Forman Atkinson Dental Museum is located at the Melbourne Dental School on the Parkville campus. It is the oldest dental collection in Australia, with over 3,500 objects, photographs, documents, and catalogues.

==== Ian Potter Museum of Art ====
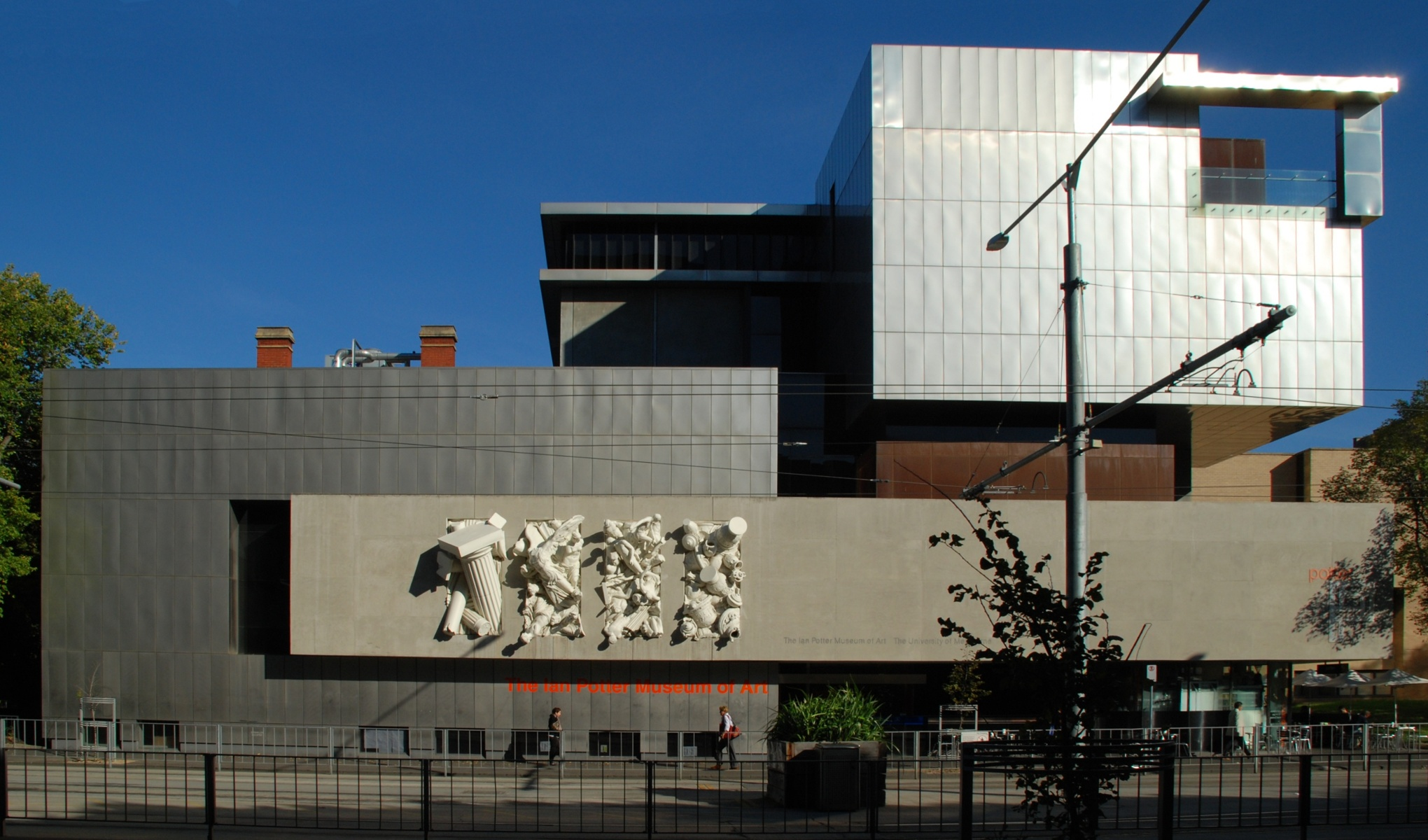
The Ian Potter Museum of Art in 2010.

The Ian Potter Museum of Art is located at the university's Parkville campus, and is the university's main art museum. Since being founded in 1972, the museum has hosted more than 500 exhibitions. The Potter's collection exceeds 18,000 objects, with works ranging from antiquity to contemporary art.

==== Medical History Museum ====
The Medical History Museum is located within the Brownless Biomedical Library at the university's Parkville campus. Exhibitions and educational programs are offered by the museum.

==== Ed Muirhead Physics Museum ====
The Ed Muirhead Physics Museum is located at the university's Parkville campus in the School of Physics building. The museum is named in honour of Ed Muirhead, who was the Chairman of the School of Physics from 1980 to 1986, and initiated the museum during that time. The collection comprises items that are of historical and scientific interest, predominantly scientific apparatus constructed by former professors and staff for research purposes.

==== Tiegs Museum ====
The Tiegs Museum is located at the university's Parkville campus in the BioSciences building. The museum hosts a collection of zoological specimens accumulated over 120 years, and is named after the former professor and faculty dean Oscar Tiegs. Specimens included in the collection range from small invertebrates to the whole mounts and skeletons of vertebrates including an African Lion and a moa (an extinct emu-like bird from New Zealand).

=== Galleries and exhibitions ===
==== Fiona & Sidney Myer Gallery ====
The Fiona & Sidney Myer Gallery is located at the university's Southbank campus in the heart of Melbourne's Arts Precinct. It provides a space for members of the Victorian College of the Arts community to showcase new work, playing an educational role for the institution. The gallery opened in 2001 (as the Margaret Lawrence Gallery) to link the Victorian College of the Arts with the University of Melbourne, and to the wider communities of Victorian and national arts. The space facilitates and encourages connections between professional artists, academics, students, and the wider public.

==== Noel Shaw Gallery ====
The Noel Shaw Gallery is located within the Baillieu Library at the university's Parkville campus. It opened in 2014, following a bequest by university alumna, Noel Shaw. Each year two exhibitions are presented in the Noel Shaw Gallery, which focus on the opportunities for curriculum engagement.

==== Buxton Contemporary ====
Buxton Contemporary is an art museum located at the university's Southbank campus, in Melbourne's Arts precinct. The museum was opened in 2018 and comprises four public exhibition galleries, teaching facilities and an outdoor screen for moving image art. The museum was the result of a gift to the university by the art collector and property developer Michael Buxton.

==== Science Gallery ====
Science Gallery Melbourne opened in 2021 at the university's Parkville campus. The 3,500 square metre gallery is in the university's new Melbourne Connect building and presents exhibitions that seek to combine art and science. The gallery forms part of the Global Science Gallery Network, based on the Science Gallery at Trinity College Dublin.

=== Other collections ===
==== Dax Centre ====
The Dax Centre is located at the university's Parkville campus in the Kenneth Myer Building. The centre is named after Eric Cunningham Dax, who pioneered the use of art to promote clinical insights and mental health improvements. Exhibitions and educational programs hosted by the centre seek to promote mental health. The Dax Centre consists of educational programs and a gallery space and also houses the Cunningham Dax Collection.

==== Herbarium ====
The University of Melbourne Herbarium is a teaching and research herbarium within the School of Biosciences.

=== Student outcomes ===
The Australian Government's QILT (Note: Abbreviation for Quality Indicators for Learning and Teaching.) conducts national surveys documenting the student life cycle from enrolment through to employment. These surveys place more emphasis on criteria such as student experience, graduate outcomes and employer satisfaction than perceived reputation, research output and citation counts.

In the 2023 Employer Satisfaction Survey, graduates of the university had an overall employer satisfaction rate of 85.4%.

In the 2023 Graduate Outcomes Survey, graduates of the university had a full-time employment rate of 67.7% for undergraduates and 88.3% for postgraduates. The initial full-time salary was A$65,300 for undergraduates and A$88,000 for postgraduates.

In the 2023 Student Experience Survey, undergraduates at the university rated the quality of their entire educational experience at 73.8% meanwhile postgraduates rated their overall education experience at 73.9%.

=== Admissions ===
The university has 11 academic units, some of which incorporate a graduate school. The overall attrition and retention rates at the university are the lowest and highest respectively in Australia. The university has one of the highest admission requirements in the country, with the median ATAR of its undergraduates being 94.05 (2009). Of the Premier's VCE Top All-Round High Achievers, 50% enrolled at the University of Melbourne.

For domestic applications, an Australian Tertiary Admission Rank (ATAR) is generally required for bachelor's degrees. For undergraduate degrees in 2019, guaranteed entry scores into degrees were: Agriculture 70, Arts 85, Biomedicine 96, Commerce 94, Design 85, Science 85 and Oral Health 85 (indicative only), while Fine Arts and Music were not applicable.

Domestic applicants who have a disadvantaged financial background, are from rural or isolated areas, are from underrepresented schools, experienced difficult circumstances, have a disability or medical condition, are from a non-English speaking background, identify as an Indigenous Australian, or are applying through a non-school leaver entry pathway may be eligible for the Access Melbourne program. The program offered guaranteed entry in 2023 for students with ATARs of: Agriculture 72, Arts 88, Biomedicine 95, Commerce 93, Design 88 and Science 88. Minimum International Baccalaureate Diploma scores for undergraduate guaranteed entry in 2019 were: Agriculture 25, Arts 31, Biomedicine 38, Commerce 36, design 31, Science 31 and Oral Health 31 (indicative only), while Fine arts and Music were not applicable.

International students compose 44% of the university's student body.

== Student life ==
=== Student unions and associations ===
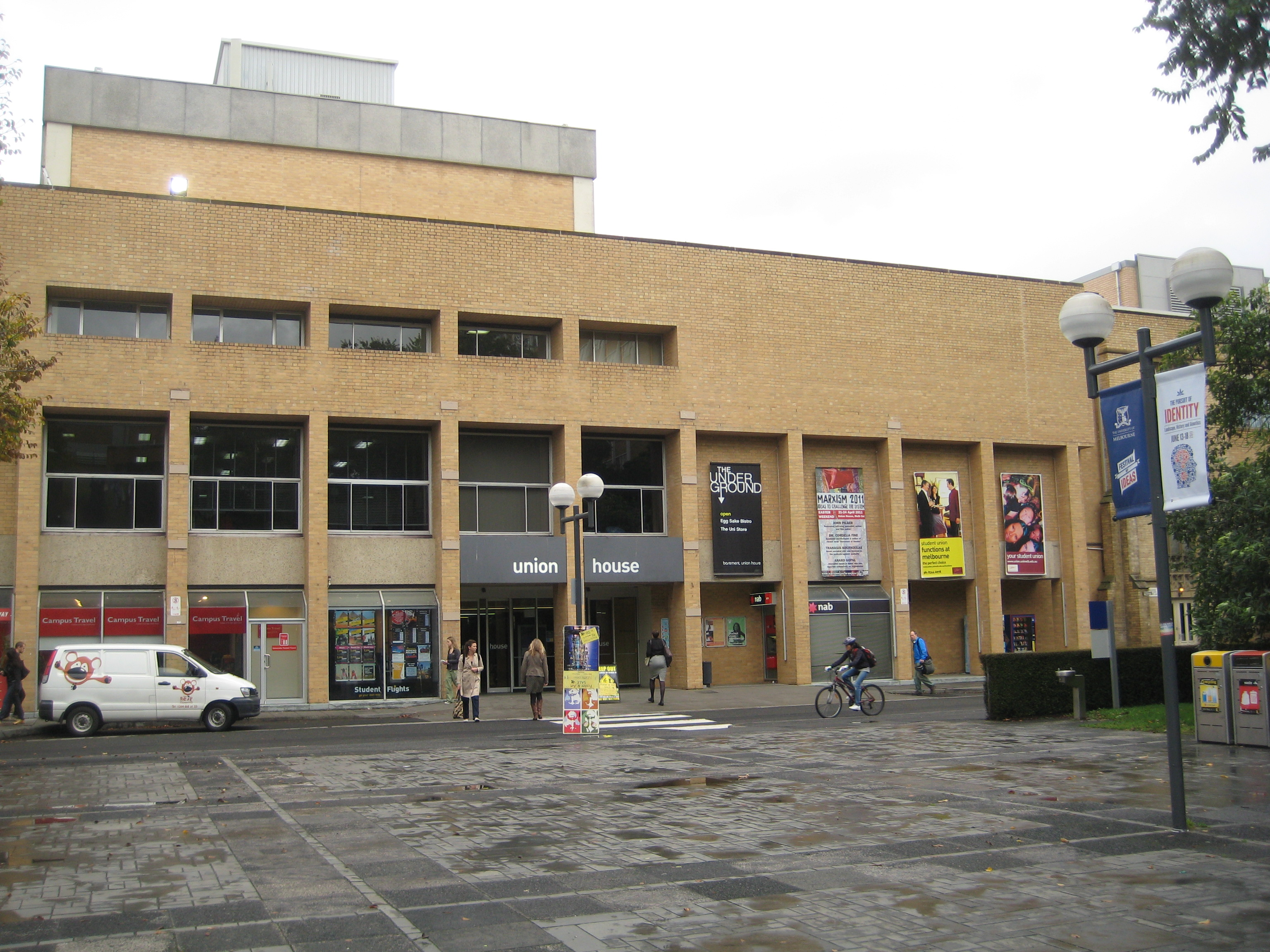
Union House, previous central hub of student activity and student union office

There are two student organisations within the University of Melbourne, the University of Melbourne Student Union (UMSU), and the Graduate Student Association. The University of Melbourne Student Union, formerly known as the Student Union was founded in 1884. Originally, it was formed to promote common interests of students, to assist social interactions between members, and provide resources for pursuing public life. The union's mission is to create a quality experience on campus by establishing a community for students, staff and visitors from a range of backgrounds and experiences. The Graduate Student Association (GSA) is an independent association that automatically provides all enrolled graduate students at the university with support, representation, events, and training. Some features of the GSA include welcoming students to the graduate school with orientation events, hosting an Annual Art Prize, and a formal Graduate Ball.

Clubs and societies offered by the university range from cultural, course-related, political, language exchange, spiritual and community focuses. There are currently over 200 clubs affiliated to the University of Melbourne Student Union, with the total membership exceeding 25,000. There are currently more than 100 groups affiliated with the GSA, with the total membership exceeding 36,000 students. Specific faculty-based clubs and societies are also offered at the university.

UMSU runs the student magazine Farrago. The UMSU Theatre Department relocated to the new Arts and Culture Building in 2022, which contains two theatres, the 398-seat Union Theatre and 102-seat Guild Theatre.

=== Sports and athletics ===
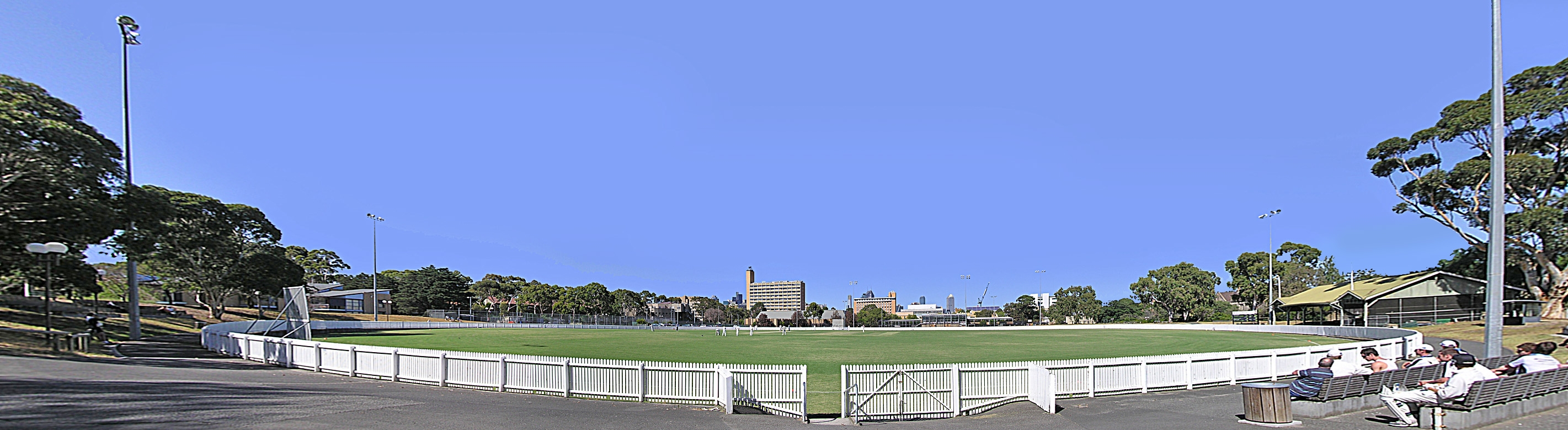
Ground of Melbourne University Cricket Club in Parkville

Sport at The University of Melbourne is overseen by Melbourne University Sport (MU Sport), which is a department of the university. The department provides the management of all sports, fitness and recreation facilities, programs and activities of the university. MU Sport also manages the university's designated entry scheme for elite athletes. Membership to the Melbourne University Sport Fitness Centre is open to University of Melbourne students, staff, alumni, and the greater community at large for those above the age of 17.

Melbourne University Sport offers access to a range of sporting clubs: aikido, athletics, badminton, baseball, basketball, cheerleading, cricket, cycling, dancesport, dragon boat, fencing, men's football, women's football, futsal, gridiron, hockey, inline, karate, kendo, lacrosse, mountaineering, netball, quidditch, rowing, rugby union, skiing, snowboarding, soccer, softball, squash, surf riding, swimming, table tennis, taekwondo-rhee, taekwondo-wtf, tai chi and wushu, tennis, touch football, underwater (SCUBA), ultimate frisbee, volleyball, water polo, waterski and wakeboard, and weightlifting and powerlifting.

The Melbourne University Football Club was established in 1859, and is the world's second oldest Australian rules football club and the second oldest football club in Australia. It achieved prominence by being admitted to what is now the Australian Football League competition in 1908, and in 1914 becoming the first in the league's history to depart the competition, due to the club's strict stance on amateurism. The Melbourne University Lacrosse Club (MULC) was established in 1883 and is the oldest continually operational lacrosse club in the world. The Melbourne University Cycling Club (MUCyc) is associated with Cycling Australia and competes regularly at local and national races. In 2008 MUCyc won its seventh consecutive AUG championship (2002–2008). The Melbourne University Tennis Club was one of the original five clubs established for the students and staff of the university, with various tennis competitions and social tennis events held on campus as early as 1882. The Melbourne University Boat Club was established in 1859 and is cited as "the oldest rowing club in Australia", a team from the Boat Club set the fastest time record for a Men's eight during the 2015 Head of the Yarra rowing regatta.

Melbourne University's men's basketball team made the Big V Championship Men's competition for the first time in 2023. In 2024, Melbourne University won the Big V Division Two women's title. Men's and women's teams also compete in the University Basketball League (UBL). The men's team won the 2023 UBL title. In 2026, the University of Melbourne won both the men's and women's UBL championships.

The facilities that The University of Melbourne offers include a gym, fitness programs, group fitness classes, cardio theatre, strength zone, group cycling studio, MindBody studio, Cardio Box studio, two multipurpose stadiums, indoor heated 25m lap pool, personal training studio, group fitness room, squash courts, and change rooms.

=== Affiliated colleges ===
Melbourne University currently has nine independent residential colleges affiliated with the university in total, seven of which are located in an arc around the cricket oval at the northern edge of the campus, known as College Crescent. The other two are located outside of university grounds.

University of Melbourne residential colleges
Trinity College 1872–present (Anglican)	Ormond College 1881–present (Presbyterian, now Uniting Church)	Janet Clarke Hall 1886–present (Anglican)	Queen's College 1887–present (Methodist, now Uniting Church)	St Mary's College 1918–present (Roman Catholic)
Newman College 1918–present (Roman Catholic)	University College; 1937–present (formerly University Women's College)	Graduate House 1971–present (Graduate Union)	St Hilda's College 1964–present (Presbyterian and Methodist, now Uniting Church)	

Most of the university's residential colleges also admit students from RMIT University and Monash University, Parkville campus, with selected colleges also accepting students from the Australian Catholic University and Victoria University.

Graduate House (since 1972) is a residential college for graduates located in Parkville's graduate precinct, which began its affiliation with the university in 1972. Whitley College (1965–2017) was a former college of the university, though it was sold to a redeveloper in 2016. Ridley College (1965–2005) was an affiliated residential college of the University of Melbourne and was the first college of the university to be co-residential for men and women.

=== Halls of residence ===
There are six University of Melbourne halls of residence owned by the university, five of them International House, Wilam Hall (formerly Medley Hall), Little Hall, Lisa Bellear House and The Lofts providing living and other facilities to students of any course, and one (W.T. Kendall Hall), which is associated with Veterinary Science, providing accommodation for students who are required to do some of their training at a university outstation.

For marketing purposes, International House and Wilam Hall are branded as 'residential colleges'. Since 2017 when the University Council revoked university regulations, both halls no longer have independent governing councils and are directly operated by the university.

University of Melbourne halls of residence
Wilam Hall (formerly Medley Hall) 1954–present	International House 1957–present	Kendall Hall; 1967–present	Lisa Bellear House; 2019–present	Little Hall 2020–present	The Lofts; 2022–present

== Notable people ==
=== Chancellors ===
The following have chaired the University Council and acted as ceremonial heads of the university as its chancellor:

- The Hon. Sir Redmond Barry, KCMG, BA LLD Dub. Melb & Penn. MA. From 17 May 1853, to 23 November 1880. Died 1880
- The Hon. Sir William Foster Stawell, KCMG, BA Dub. LLD Dub. & Melb. MA. From 2 May 1881, to 8 May 1882. Died 1889
- The Rt. Rev. Dr James Moorhouse, DD Camb. MA Camb. & Melb. From 7 July 1884, to 1 February 1886. Died 1915
- The Hon. Dr William Edward Hearn, QC, AM LLD Dub. From 3 May to 4 October 1886. Died 1888
- Sir Anthony Colling Brownless, CMG, MD St. And. & Melb. LLD FRCS. From 4 April 1887 to 3 December 1897. Died 1897
- The Hon. Sir John Madden, GCMG, BA LLB LLD. From 20 December 1897, to 10 March 1918. Died 1918
- Sir John Henry MacFarland, Kt, MA Belf. & Camb. LLD. From 8 April 1918, to 22 July 1935. Died 1935
- Sir James William Barrett, KBE CB CMG, LLD Manit. MD MS Hon. LLD FRCS FRACS. From 30 August 1935, to 6 March 1939. Died 1945
- The Rt. Hon. Sir John Greig Latham, PC GCMG KC, MA LLM Hon. LLD. From 6 March 1939, to 3 March 1941. Died 1964
- The Hon. Sir Charles John Lowe, KCMG, MA Adel. & Melb. LLB Hon. LLD. From 3 March 1941, to 15 March 1954. Died 1969
- The Hon. Sir Arthur Dean, Kt QC, LLM Hon. LLD. From 15 March 1954, to 7 March 1966. Died 1970.
- Sir William George Dismore Upjohn, Kt OBE, MD MS Hon. LLD FRCS FRACS. From 7 March 1966, to 6 March 1967. Died 1979
- Robert Menzies, KT AK CH QC Constable of Dover Castle, Lord Warden of Cinque Ports, LLM Hon. LLD (Brist. Belf. Melb. Br. Col. Syd. McGill Malta Laval Tas. Camb. Harv. Leeds Adel. Q'ld Edin. Birm. A.N.U. Sus. Drury College and Calif.), Hon. DCL Oxf. Kent Hon. D.Litt. W.Aust. Hon. DSc N.S.W. Hon. FAHA Hon. MAustMM FRS Hon. FRCS Barrister-at-Law. From 6 March 1967 to 6 March 1972. Died 1978
- Leonard William Weickhardt, CBE, Hon. DASc V.I.C. MSc Hon. LLD FIChemE FRACI. From 6 March 1972 to 18 March 1978. Died July 2000
- The Hon. Sir Oliver James Gillard, Kt, BA LLB. From 18 March 1978 to 3 March 1980. Died 1984.
- Professor Emeritus Sir Roy Douglas Wright, AK, DSc A.N.U. & Melb. Hon.LLD A.N.U. & Melb. MB MS FRACP. From 3 March 1980 to 31 December 1989. Died 1990
- The Hon Sir (Albert) Edward Woodward, AC Kt OBE QC, LLM Melb. HonLLD NSW HonDLitt Ballarat. From 1 January 1990 to 2 February 2001. Died April 2010
- Fay Surtees Marles, AM MA Melb. DipSocSt Melb. From 3 February 2001 to 31 December 2004
- Ian Andrew Renard, AM BA Melb. LLM Melb. From 1 January 2005 to 9 January 2009
- The Hon. Mr Alex Chernov, AO QC AC BCom LLB (Hons) Melb. From 10 January 2009 to 7 April 2011
- Elizabeth Alexander, AO. From 8 April 2011 to 31 December 2016
- Allan Myers, AC KC. From 1 January 2017 to 31 December 2022
- Jane Hansen, AO. From 1 January 2023 to Present

=== Vice-chancellors ===
The following have led the university as its vice-chancellor:

- Carolyn Evans: From 5 October 2026
- Glyn Davis: Acting from 2 February 2026 until 4 October 2026
- Michael Wesley: Acting from 29 December 2025 – 2 February 2026
- Emma Johnston: 10 February 2025 – 28 December 2025
- Duncan Maskell: 1 October 2018 – 9 February 2025
- Glyn Davis: 10 January 2005 – 30 September 2018
- Kwong Lee Dow: 1 February 2004 – 9 January 2005
- Alan Gilbert: 1 January 1996 – 31 January 2004
- David Penington: 1 January 1988 – 31 December 1995
- David Caro: 1 June 1982 – 31 December 1987
- Sir David Derham: 1 March 1968 – 31 May 1982
- Sir George Paton: 1 July 1951 – 29 February 1968
- Sir John Medley: 1 July 1938 – 1 July 1951
- Sir Raymond Priestley: 1 January 1935 – 30 June 1938
- Sir James Barrett: 7 December 1931 – 17 December 1934
- Sir John Monash: 2 July 1923 – 8 October 1931
- Sir John Grice: 6 May 1918 – 18 June 1923
- Sir John MacFarland: 7 March 1910 – 8 April 1918
- Sir Henry Wrixon: 20 December 1897 – 7 March 1910
- Sir John Madden: 3 June 1889 – 20 December 1897
- Martin Irving: 2 May 1887 – 27 May 1889
- Sir Anthony Brownless: 31 May 1858 – 4 April 1887
- William Haines: 15 May 1857 – 31 May 1858
- Hugh Childers: 17 May 1853 – 12 March 1857

=== Nobel laureates ===
Some Nobel laureates have/had taught, studied and researched at the University of Melbourne, including:

- Richard Robson, Nobel Prize in Chemistry (2025)
- James Alan Robinson, Nobel Memorial Prize in Economic Sciences (2024)
- Tilman Ruff, International Campaign to Abolish Nuclear Weapons (ICAN), Nobel Peace Prize (2017)
- Elizabeth Blackburn, Nobel Prize in Physiology or Medicine (2009)
- Intergovernmental Panel on Climate Change (IPCC), Nobel Peace Prize (2007)
- Sir James Mirrlees, Nobel Memorial Prize in Economic Sciences (1996)
- Peter Doherty, Nobel Prize in Physiology or Medicine (1996)
- Bert Sakmann, Nobel Prize in Physiology or Medicine (1991)
- Sir John Eccles, Nobel Prize in Physiology or Medicine (1963)
- Sir Frank Macfarlane Burnet, Nobel Prize in Physiology or Medicine (1960)
- Joshua Lederberg, Nobel Prize in Physiology or Medicine (1958)
- Howard Florey, Nobel Prize in Physiology or Medicine (1945)

=== Dan David Prize winner ===
- Matthew Champion, historian of medieval and early modern societies (2026)

=== Notable alumni ===
The University of Melbourne has produced many notable alumni, with graduates having been Governor-General of Australia, Governor of Victoria, Prime Minister of Australia, justices of the High, Federal, Family and Victorian Supreme courts, Premiers of Victoria and elected leaders of other states and territories, Nobel laureates, a First Lady of East Timor, ministers of foreign countries, lord mayors, academics, architects, historians, poets, philosophers, politicians, scientists, physicists, authors, industry leaders, defence force personnel, corporate leaders, community leaders, as well as numerous artists. Frances Dorothy Gray became Australia's first female Bachelor of Dental Science graduate, when she graduated from the Australian College of Dentistry at the University of Melbourne in 1907.

Notable University of Melbourne alumni include:

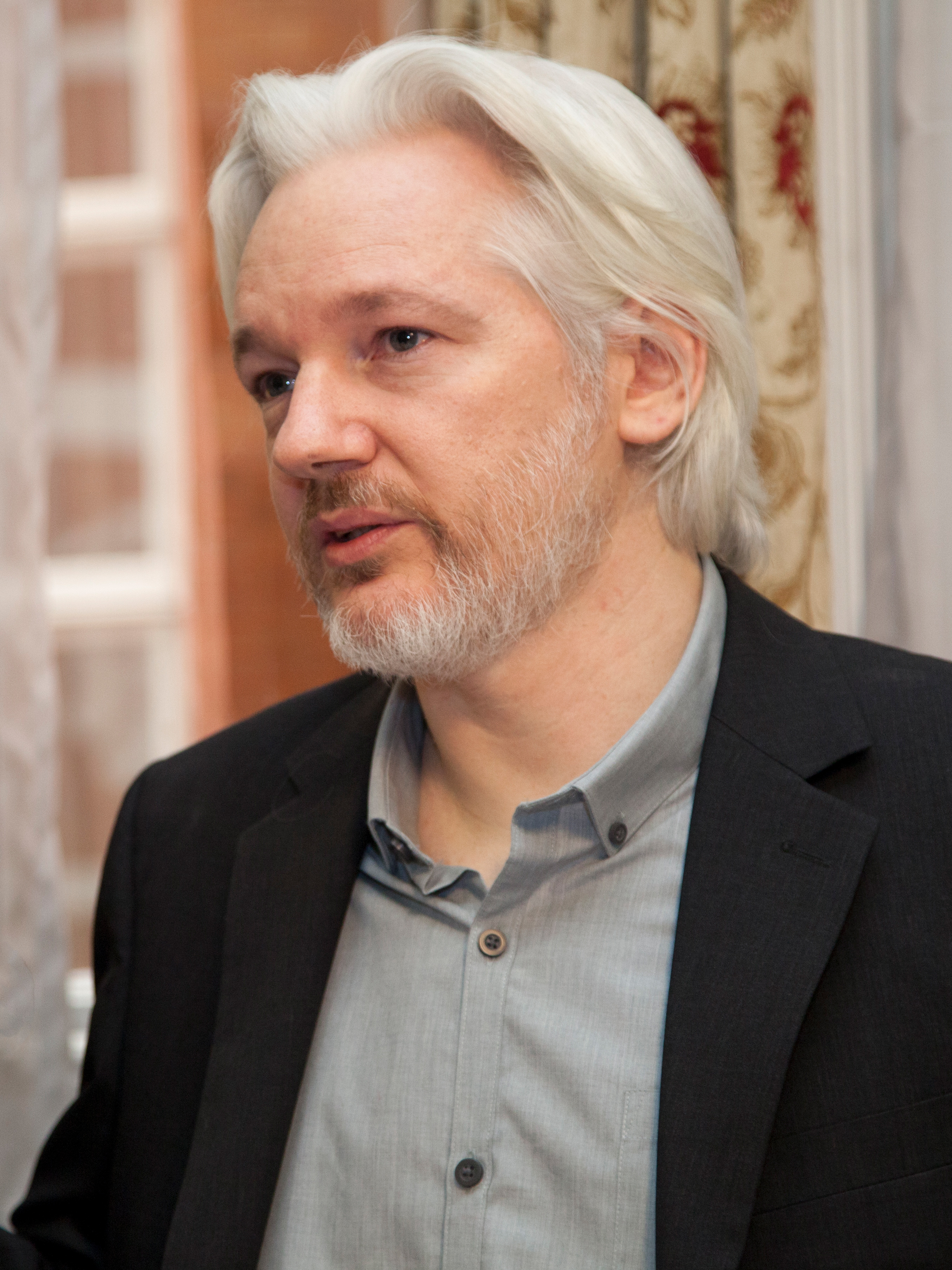
Julian Assange, activist

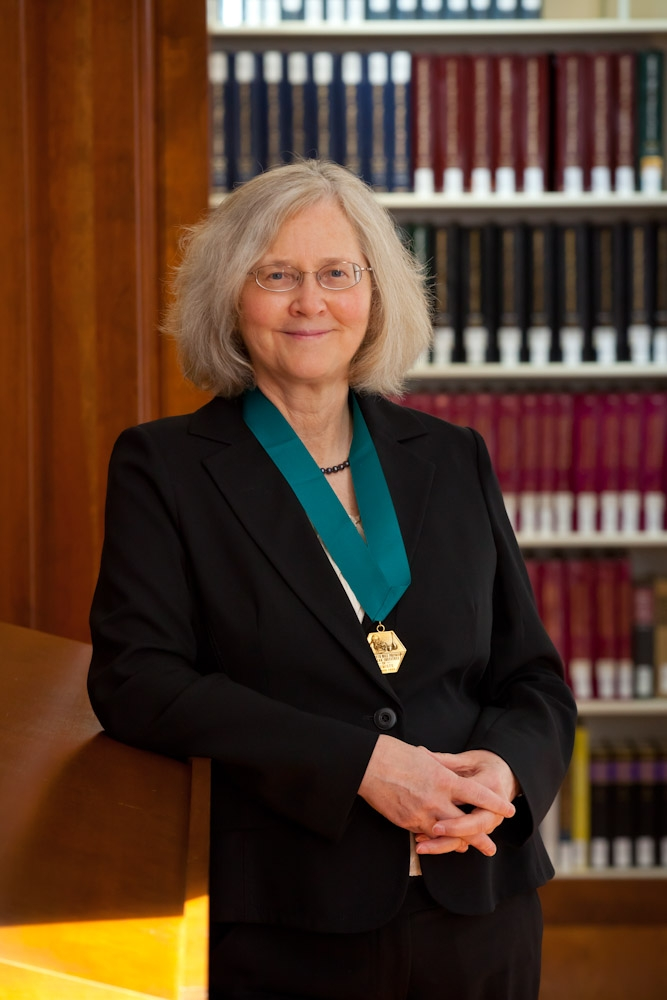
Elizabeth Blackburn, biologist

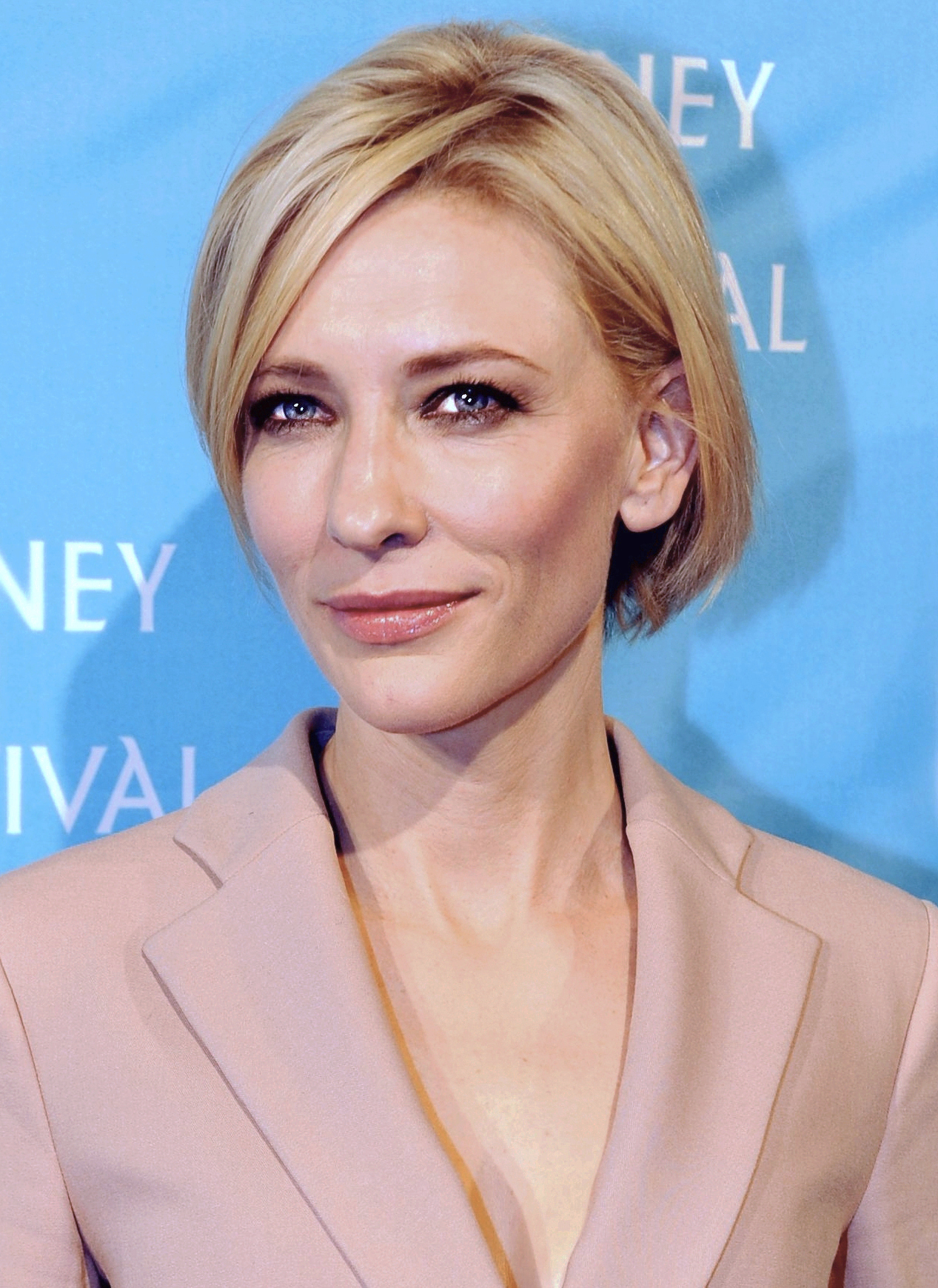
Cate Blanchett, actress

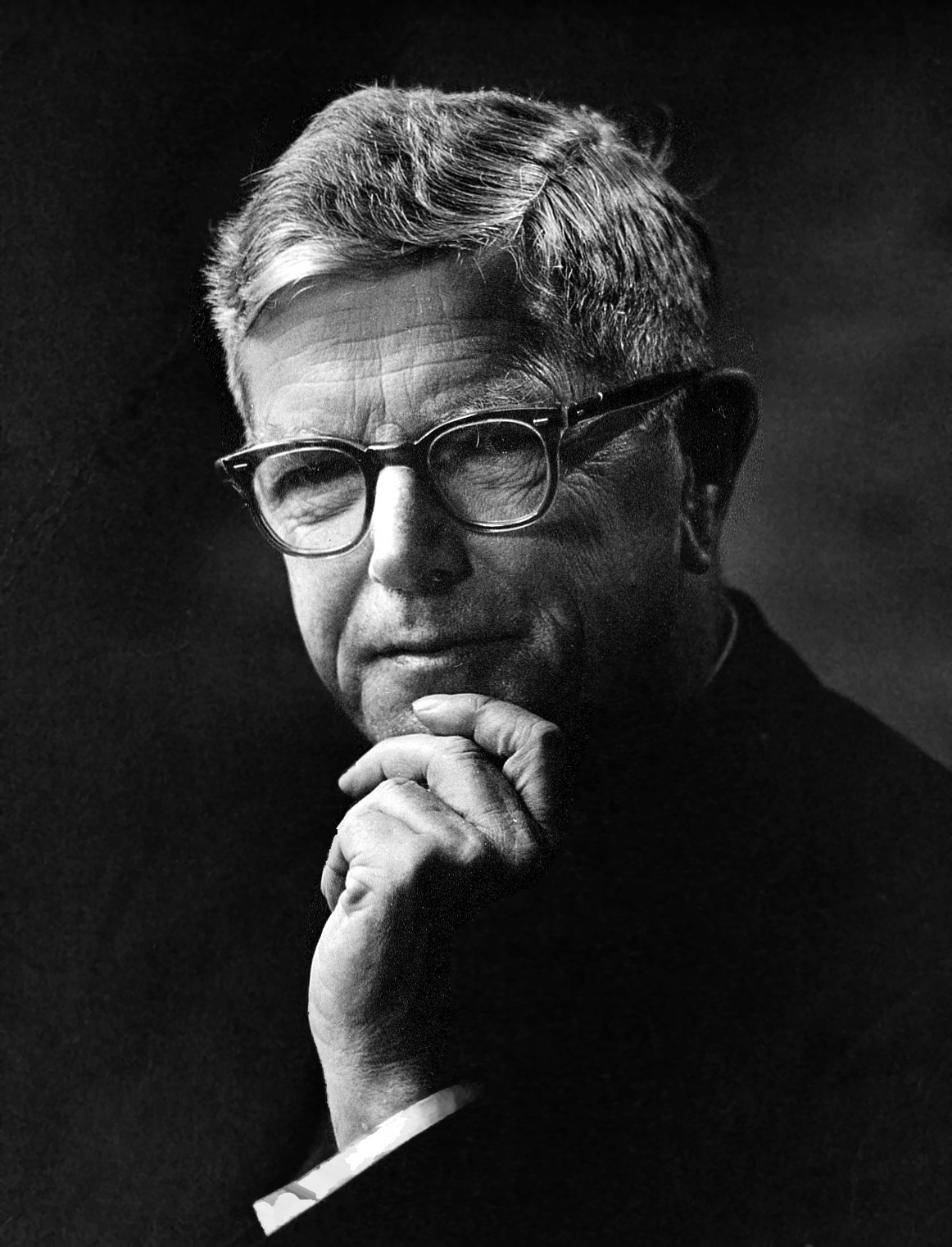
Frank Macfarlane Burnet, virologist

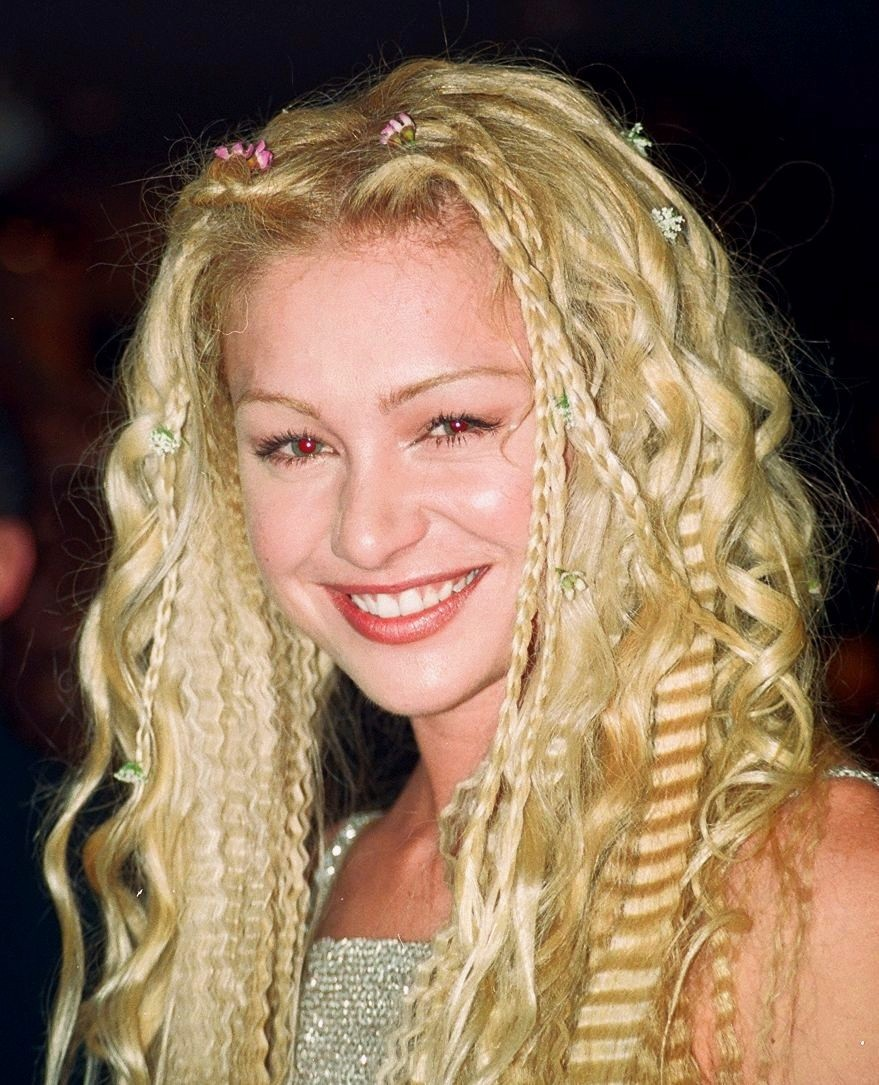
Portia de Rossi, actress

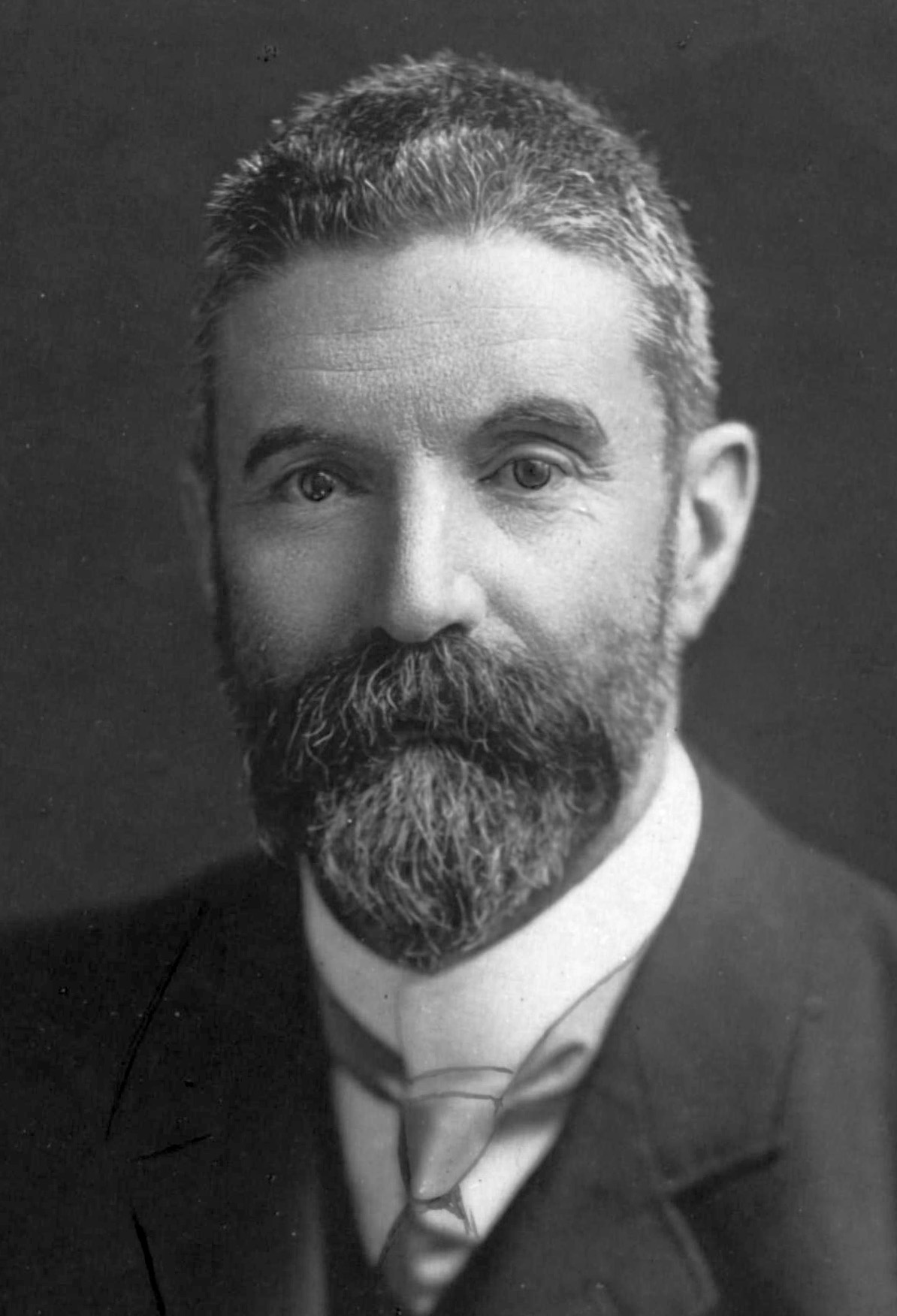
Alfred Deakin, Prime Minister of Australia

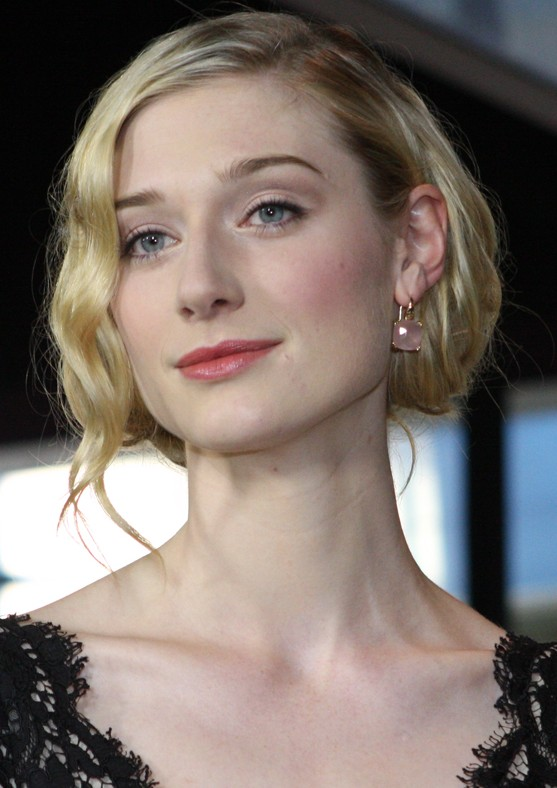
Elizabeth Debicki, actress

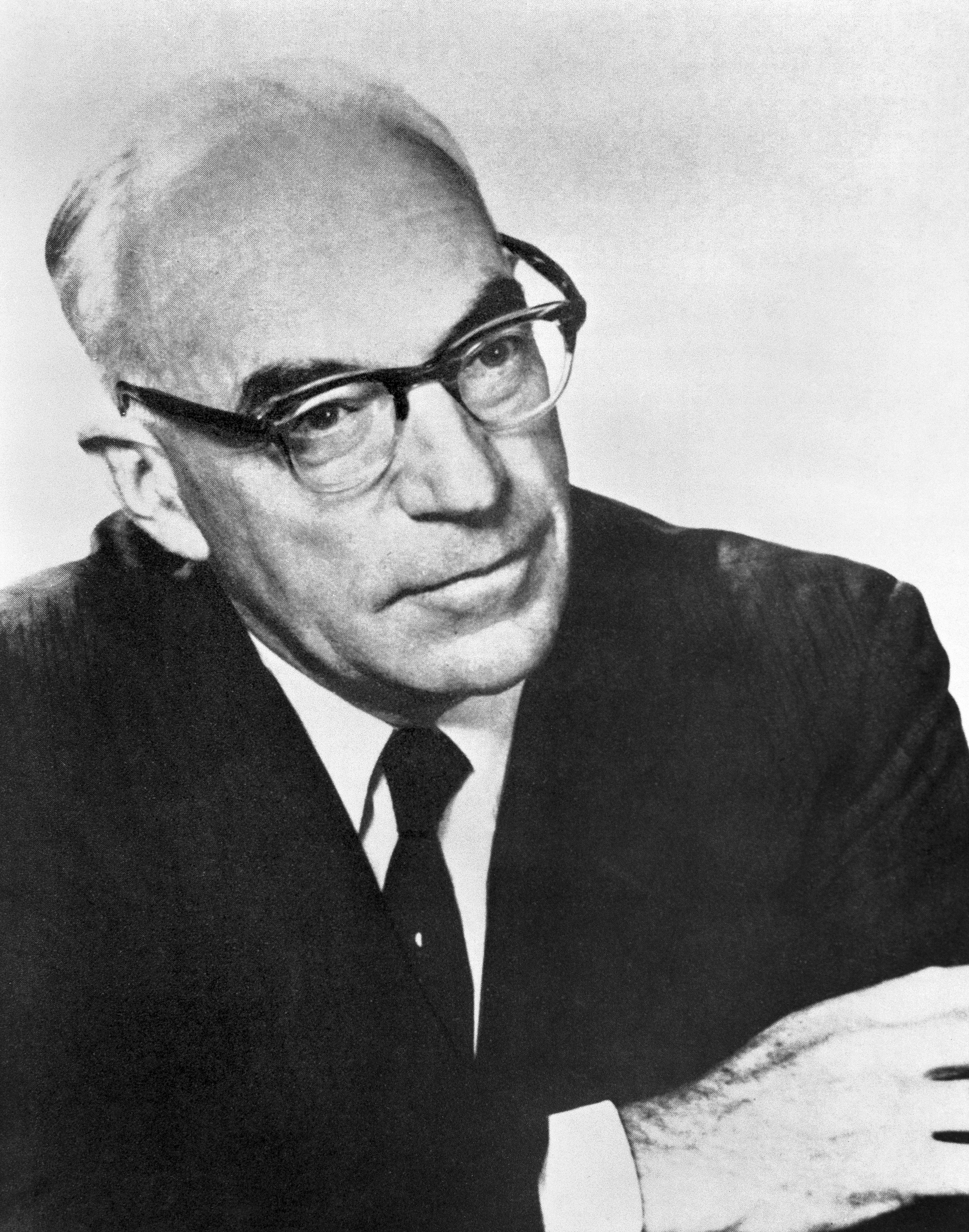
John Eccles, neurophysiologist

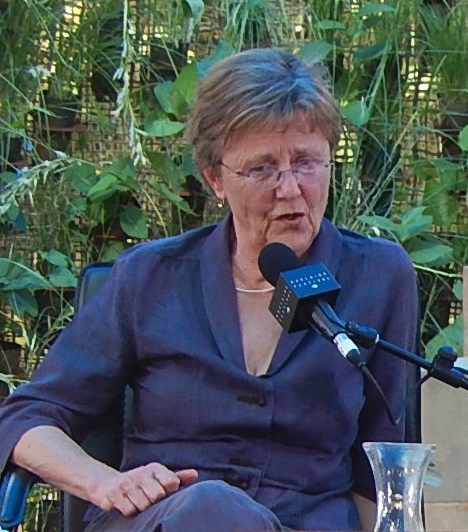
Helen Garner, writer

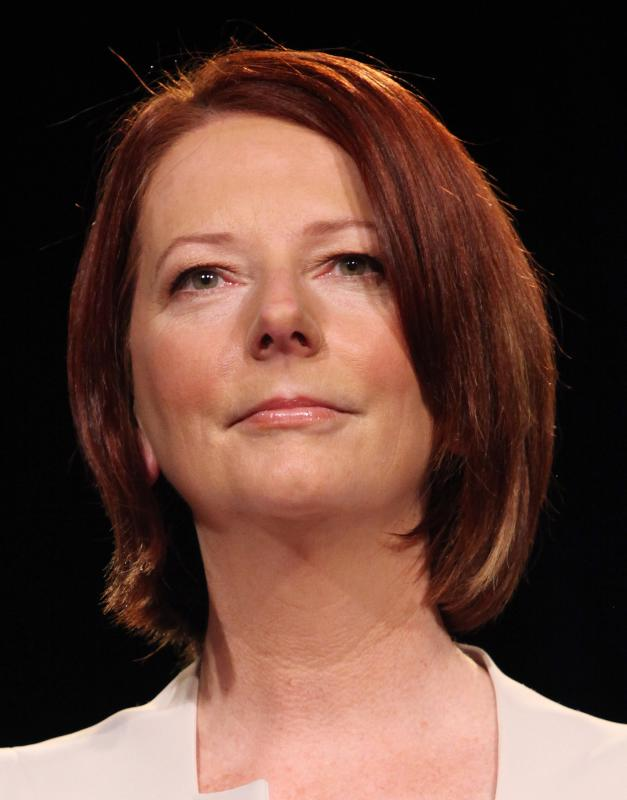
Julia Gillard, Prime Minister of Australia

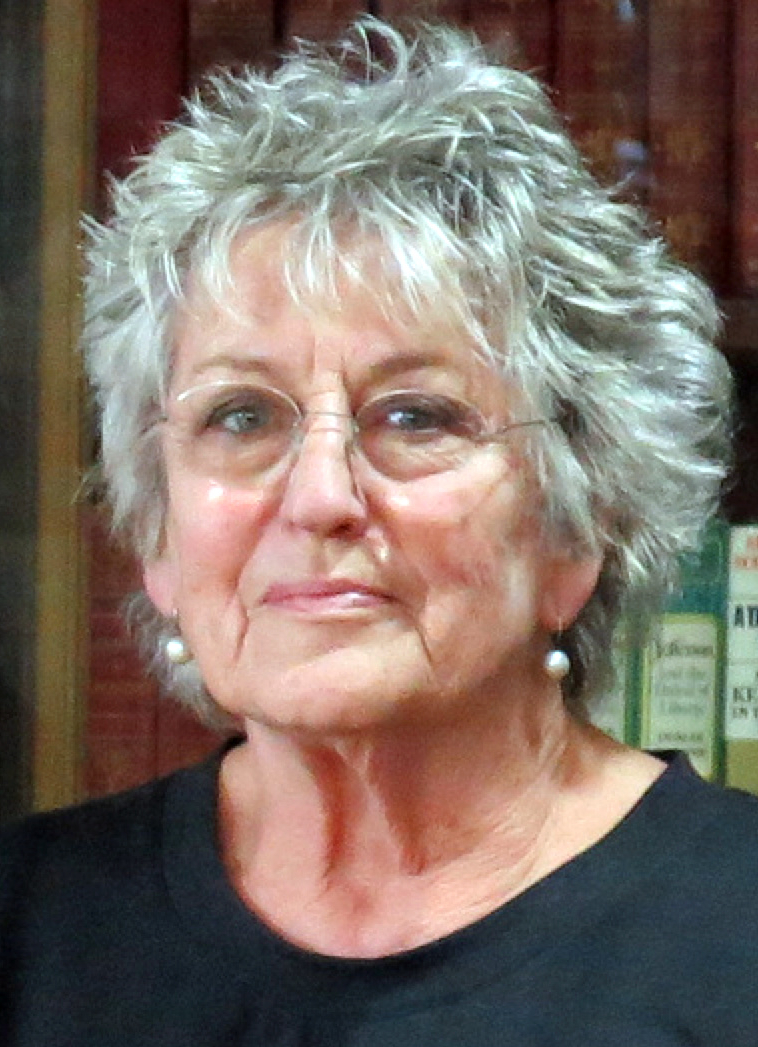
Germaine Greer, public intellectual

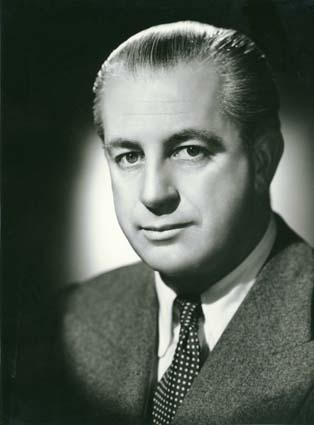
Harold Holt, Prime Minister of Australia

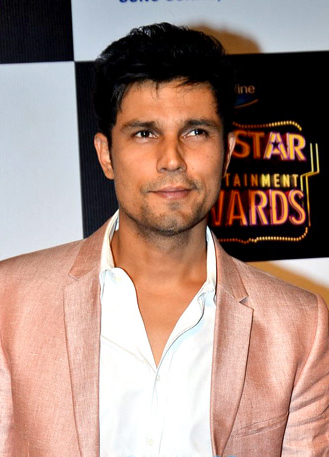
Randeep Hooda, actor

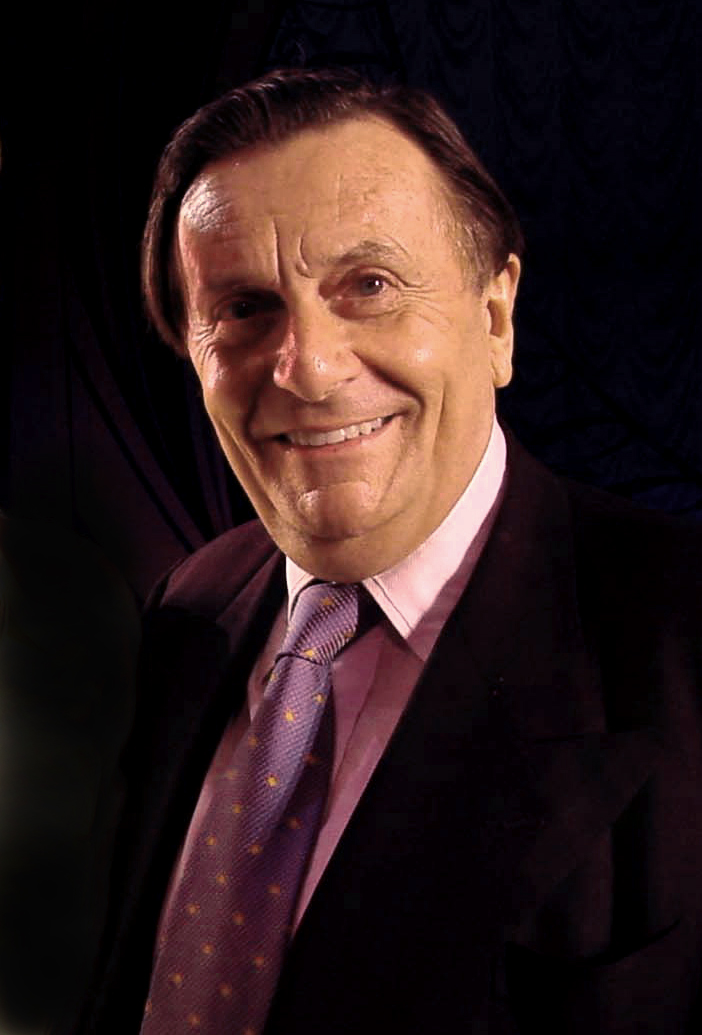
Barry Humphries, comedian

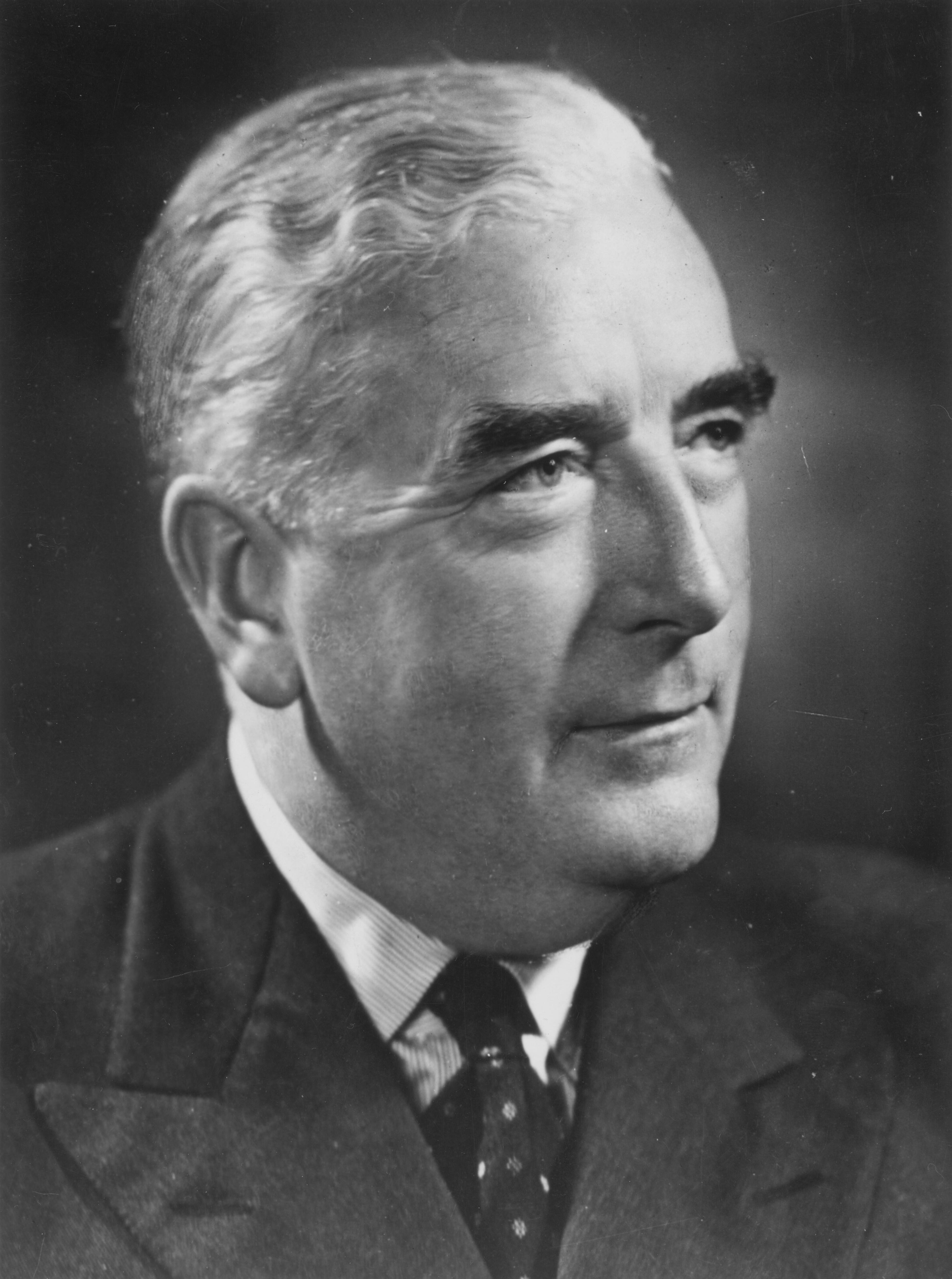
Robert Menzies, Prime Minister of Australia

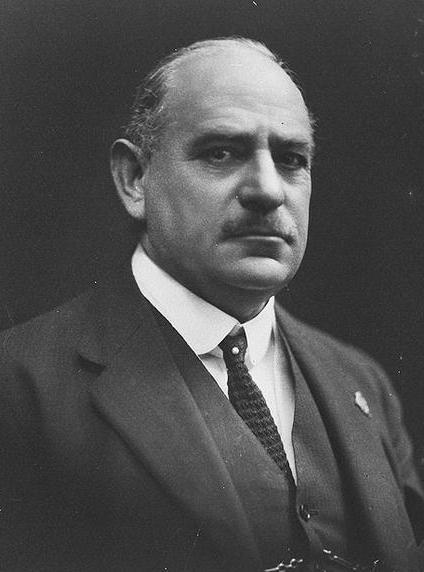
John Monash, military commander

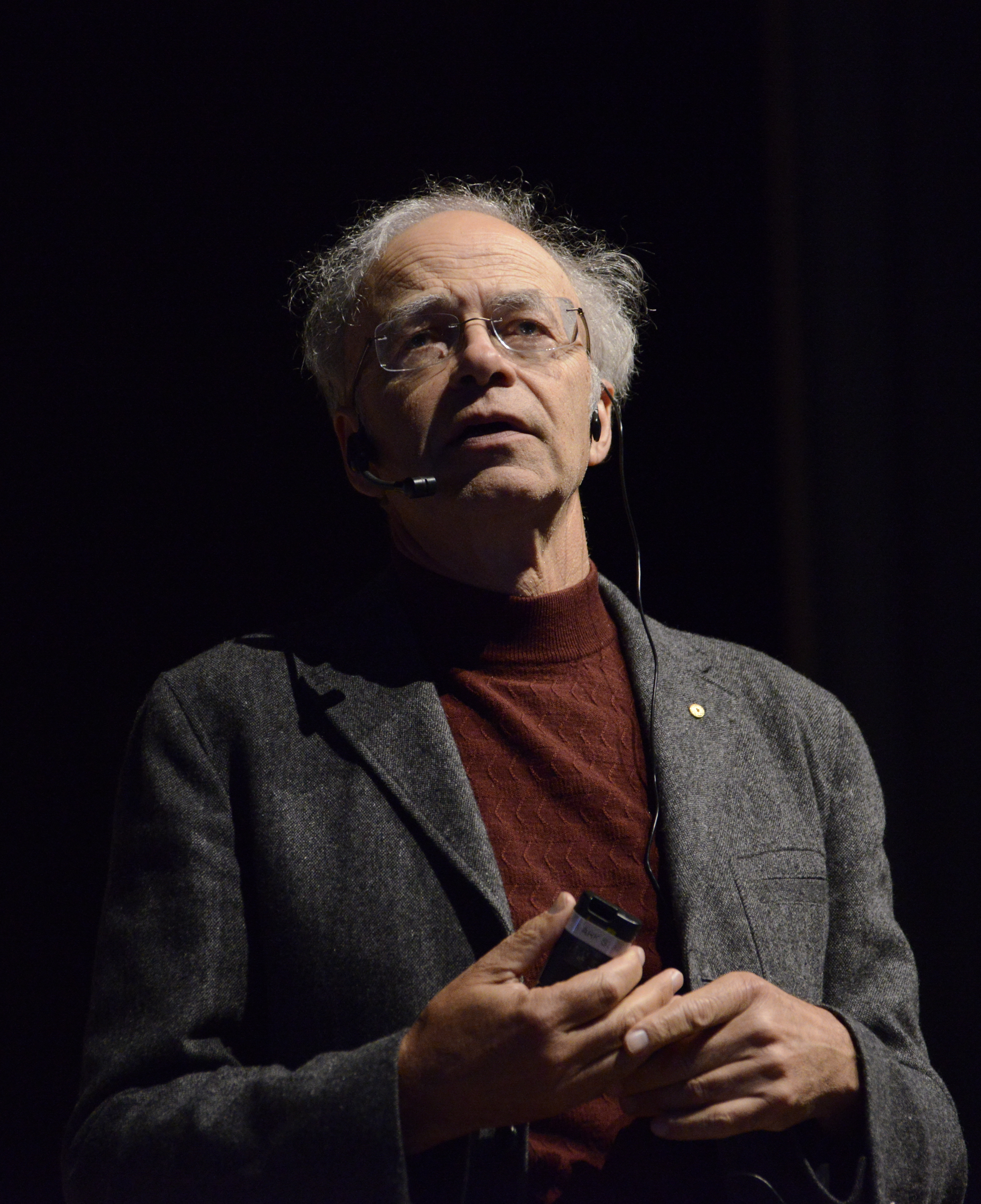
Peter Singer, philosopher

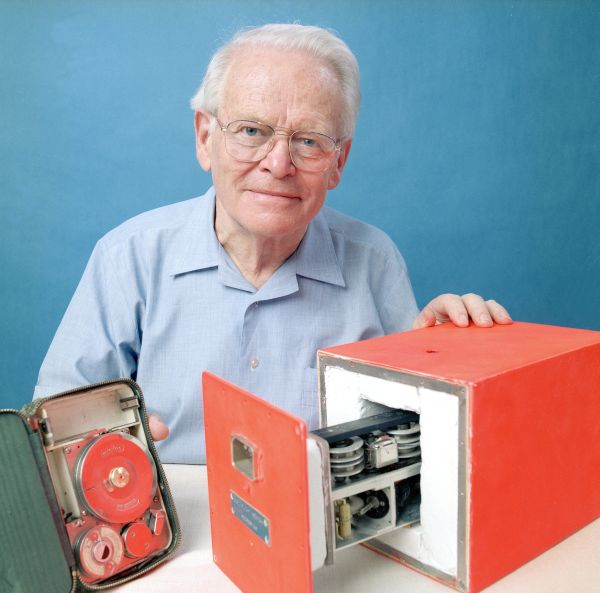
David Warren, inventor

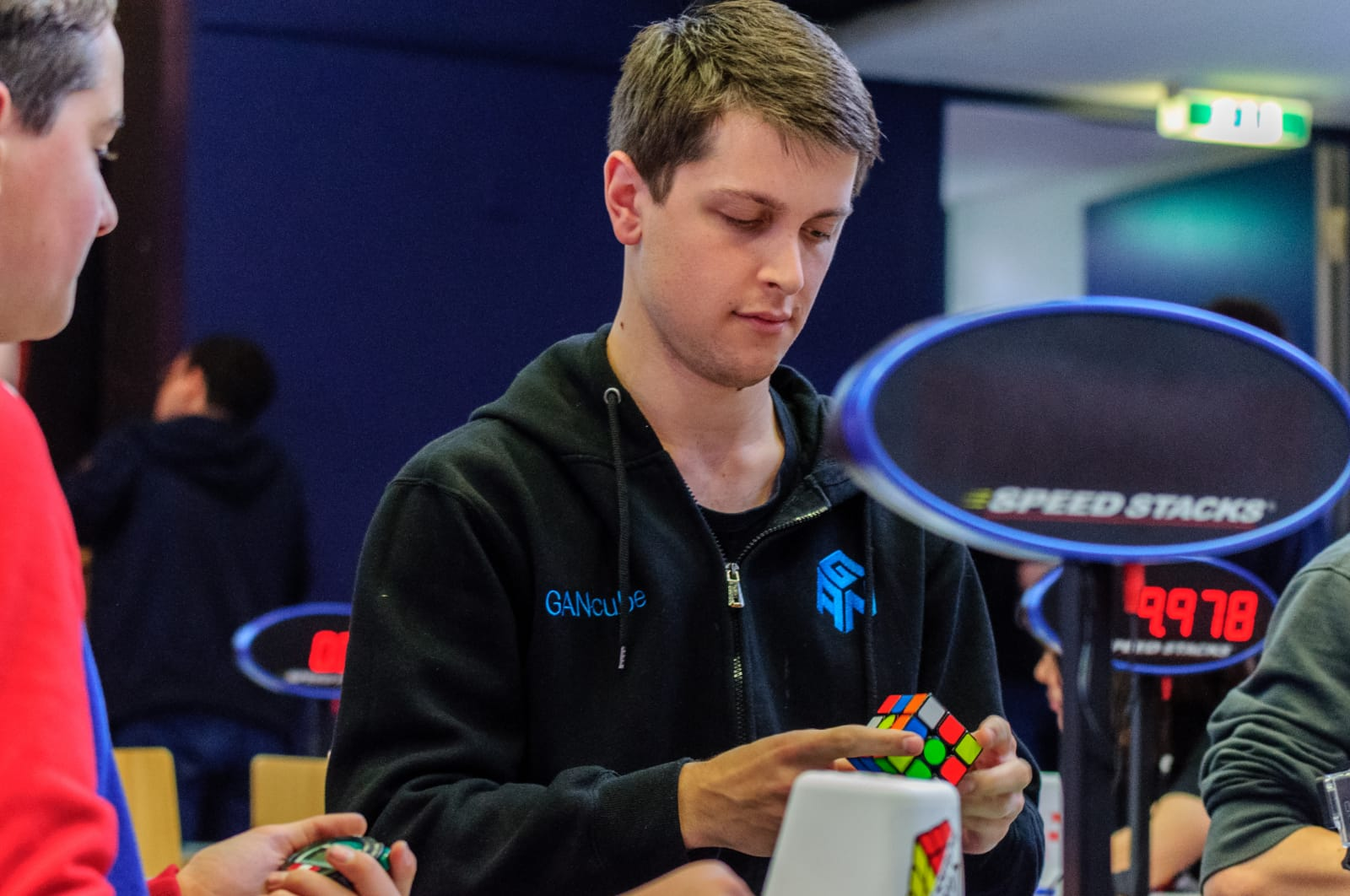
Feliks Zemdegs, speedcuber

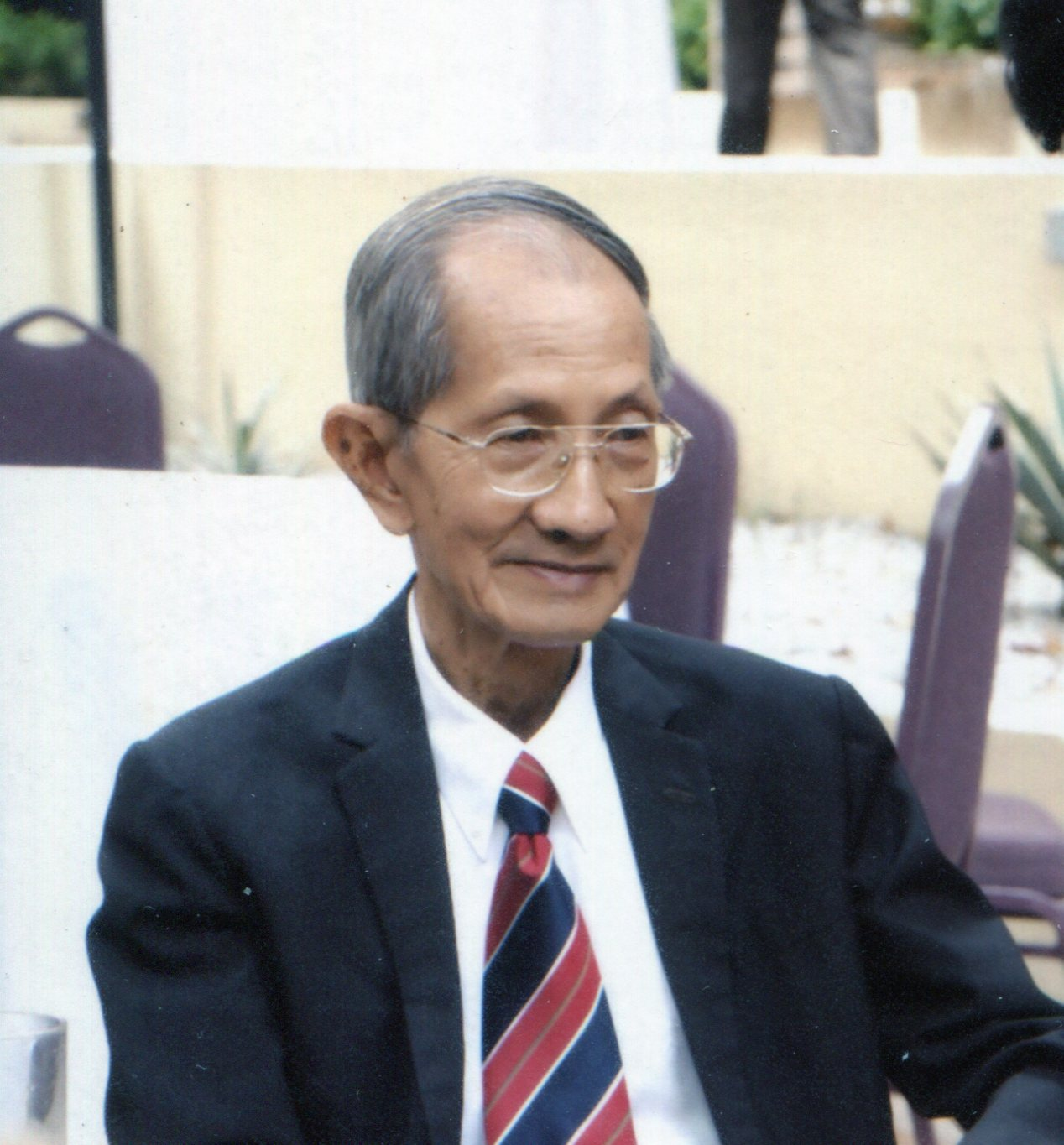
Chin Hoong Fong, seed scientist

=== Awards and prizes ===
- The University of Melbourne Award "recognises individuals who have made an outstanding and enduring contribution to the University and its scholarly community". Recipients of the award are acknowledged by bronze commemorative plaques along Professors Walk on the Parkville campus.
- The Patricia Grimshaw Awards for Mentor Excellence are awarded annually to staff at the University of Melbourne to recognise mentoring skills and behaviours. The award was launched by the university in March 2008 to honour historian Patricia Grimshaw's "contribution as a mentor of postgraduate students and younger colleagues".
- The Dublin Prize was instituted by graduates of Trinity College Dublin in 1910 to recognise students or past students who, in the previous year, "made the most important original contribution to literature, science or art". Recipients include J. McKellar Stewart (1912), Bernard O'Dowd (1913), Arthur Sherwin (1914), Rev. Kenneth T. Henderson (1920), W. H. Downing (1921), N. H. Fairley (1922), Edward Sweetman (1923), C. W. W. Webster (1924), Stephen H. Roberts (1925), Donald H. Rankin (1927), Charles Daley (1929) and Brian C. Fitzpatrick (1941).

== Gallery ==
Buildings of the Parkville Campus
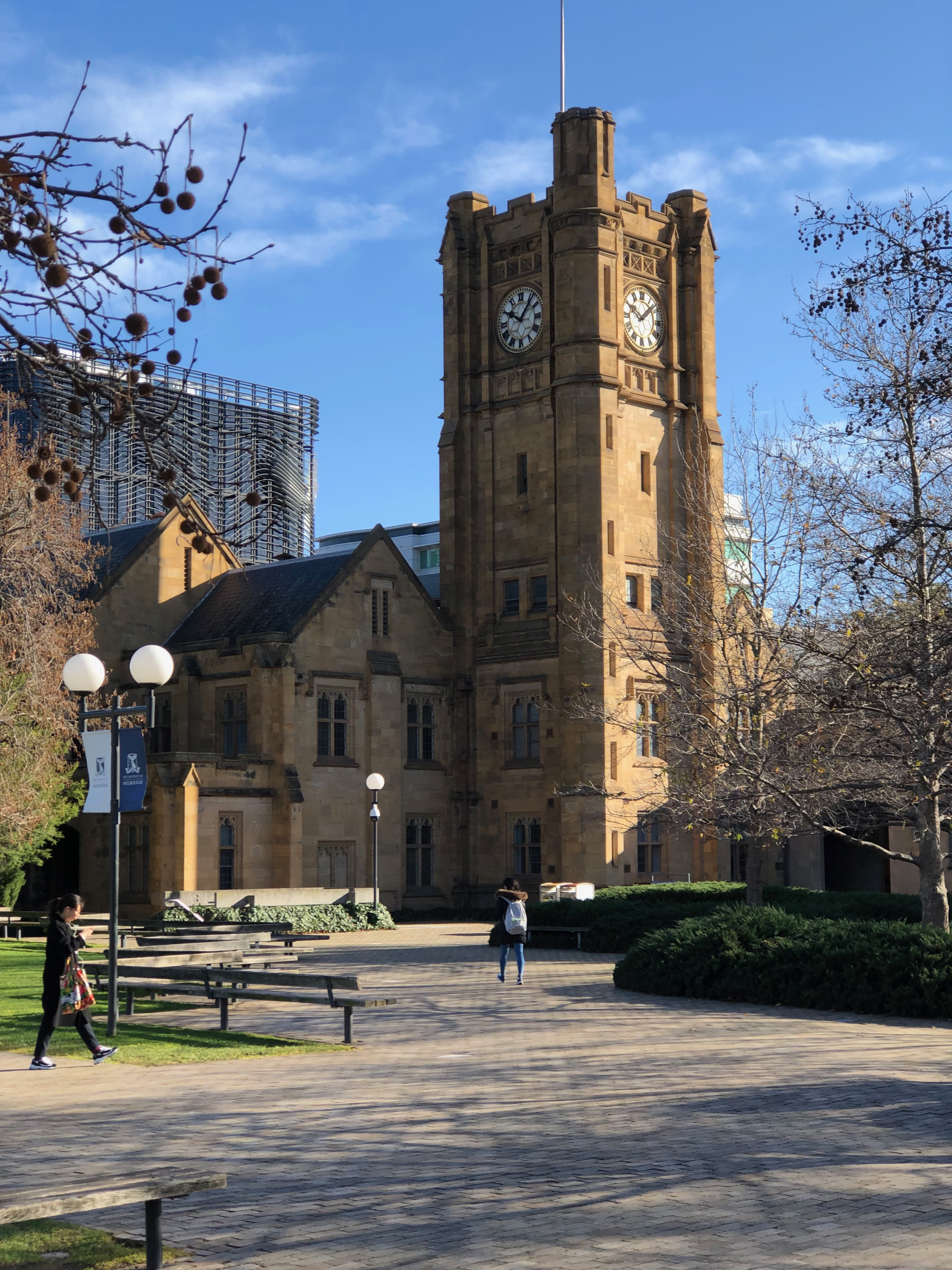
Clocktower at the Old Arts Building, viewed from South Lawn

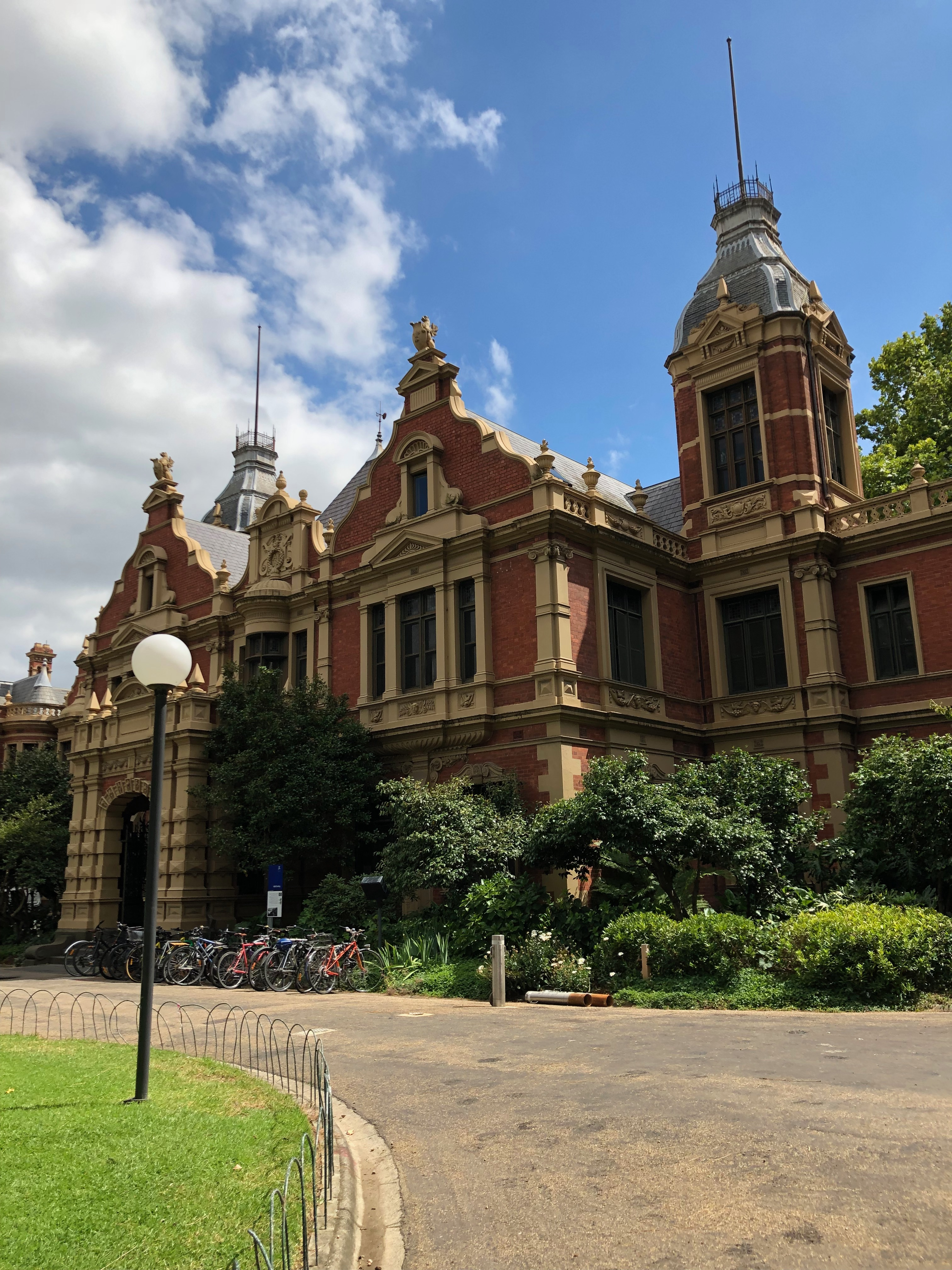
1888 Building, home to the Graduate Student Association

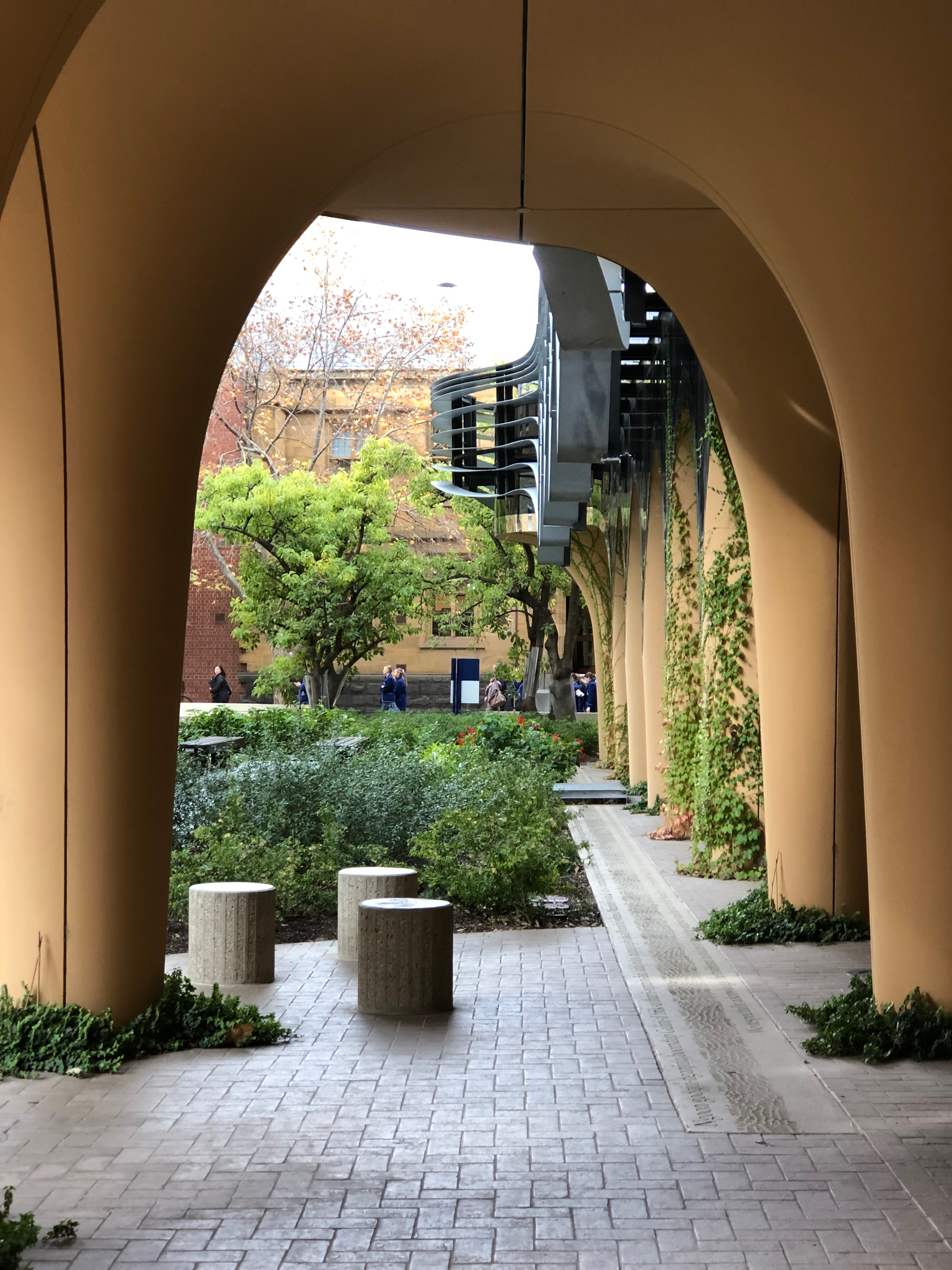
Arts West colonnade, 2018

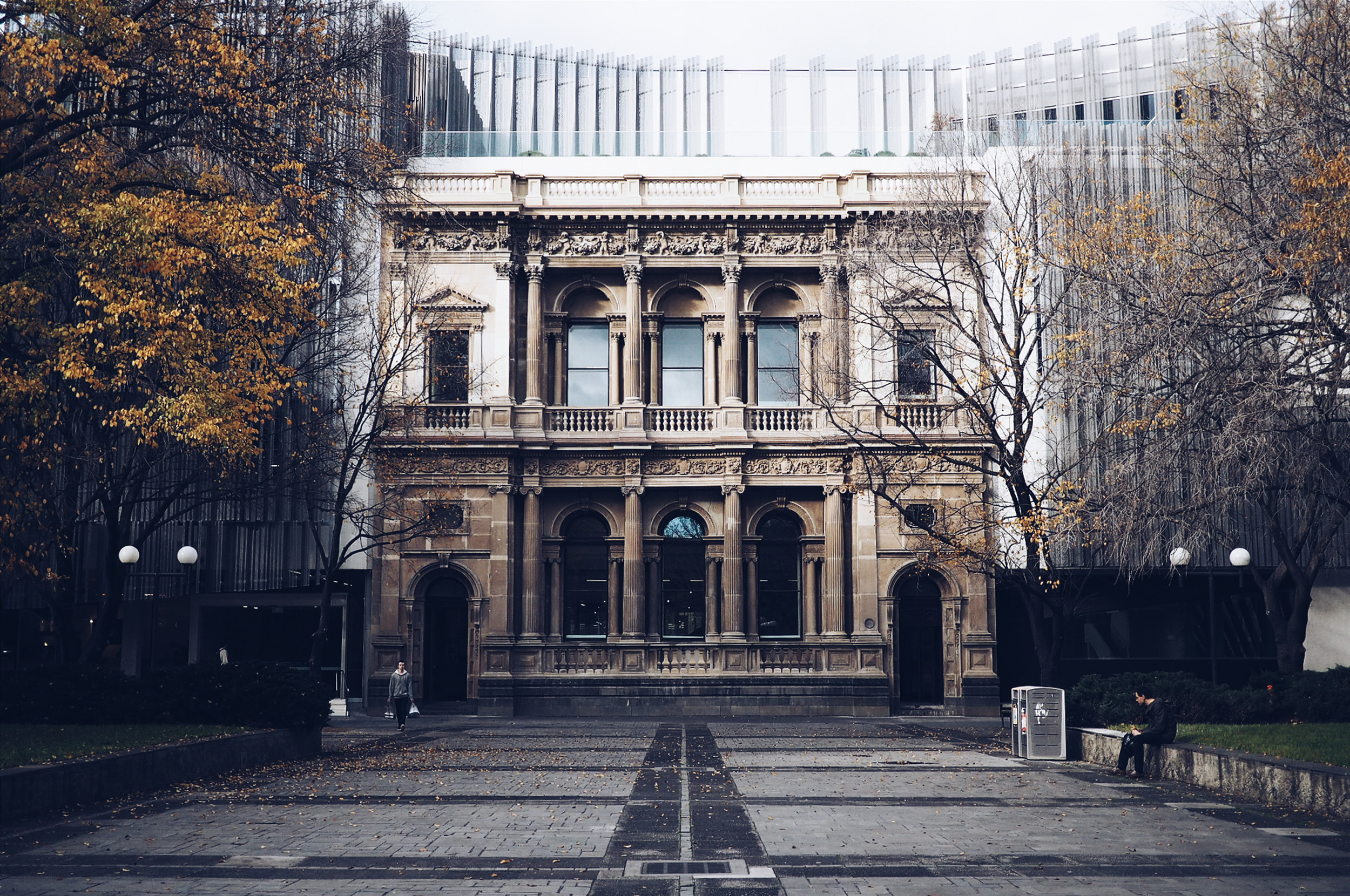
Glyn Davis Building, home to the Melbourne School of Design, which incorporates the relocated facade of a Collins Street bank

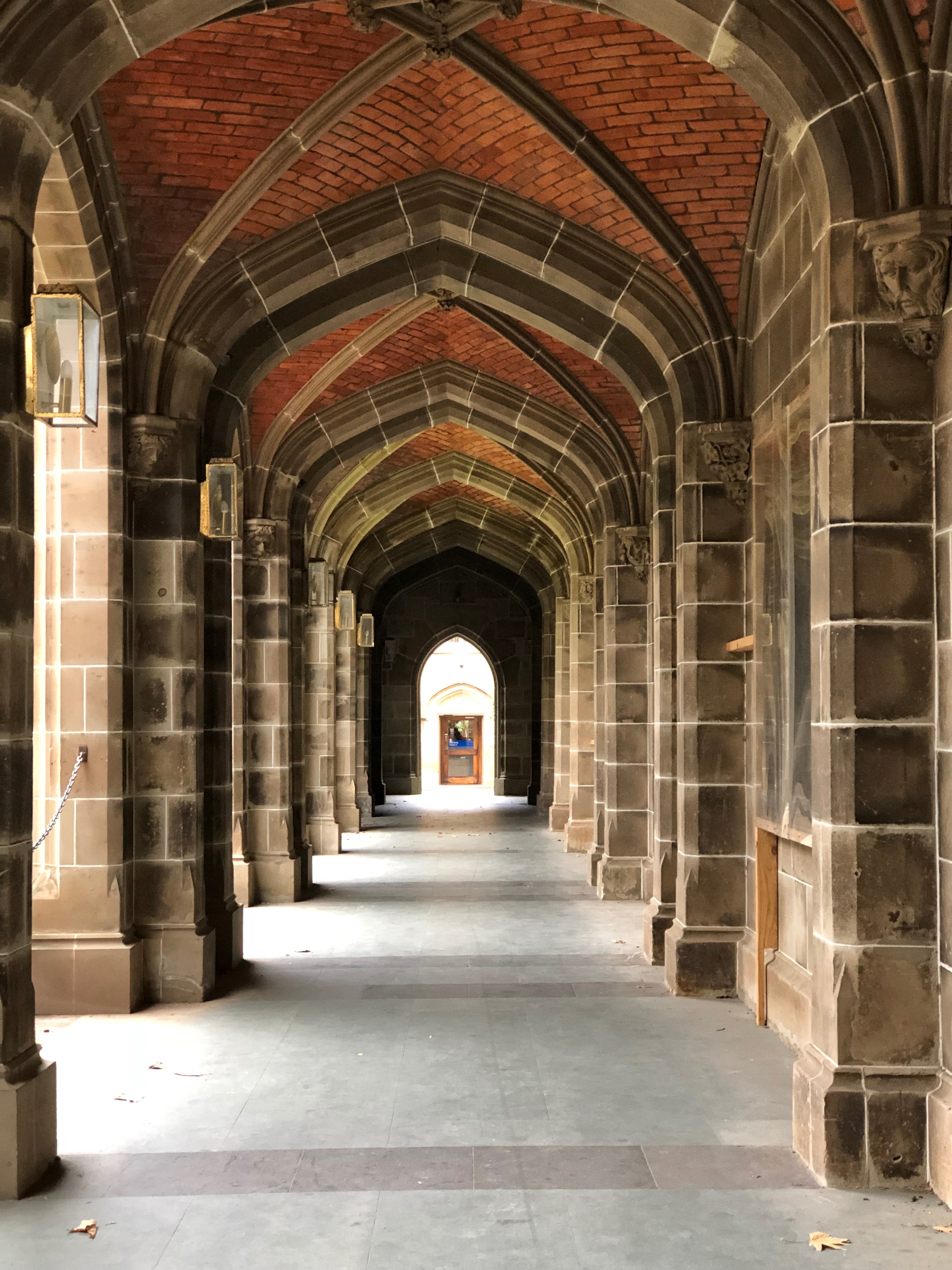
View down the colonnade on the Northern section of the Old Quad, the first building at the University of Melbourne

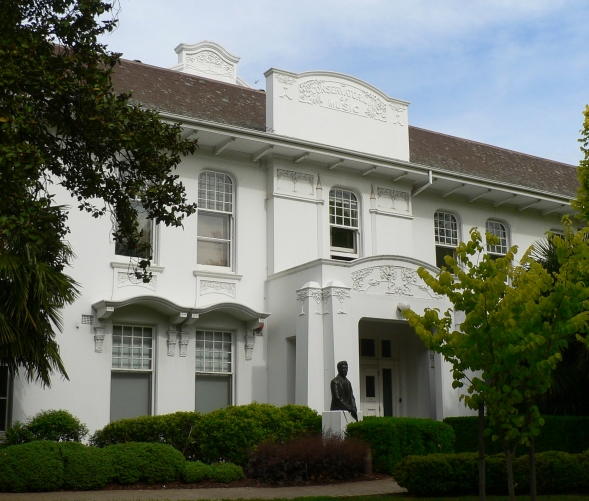
Conservatorium Building

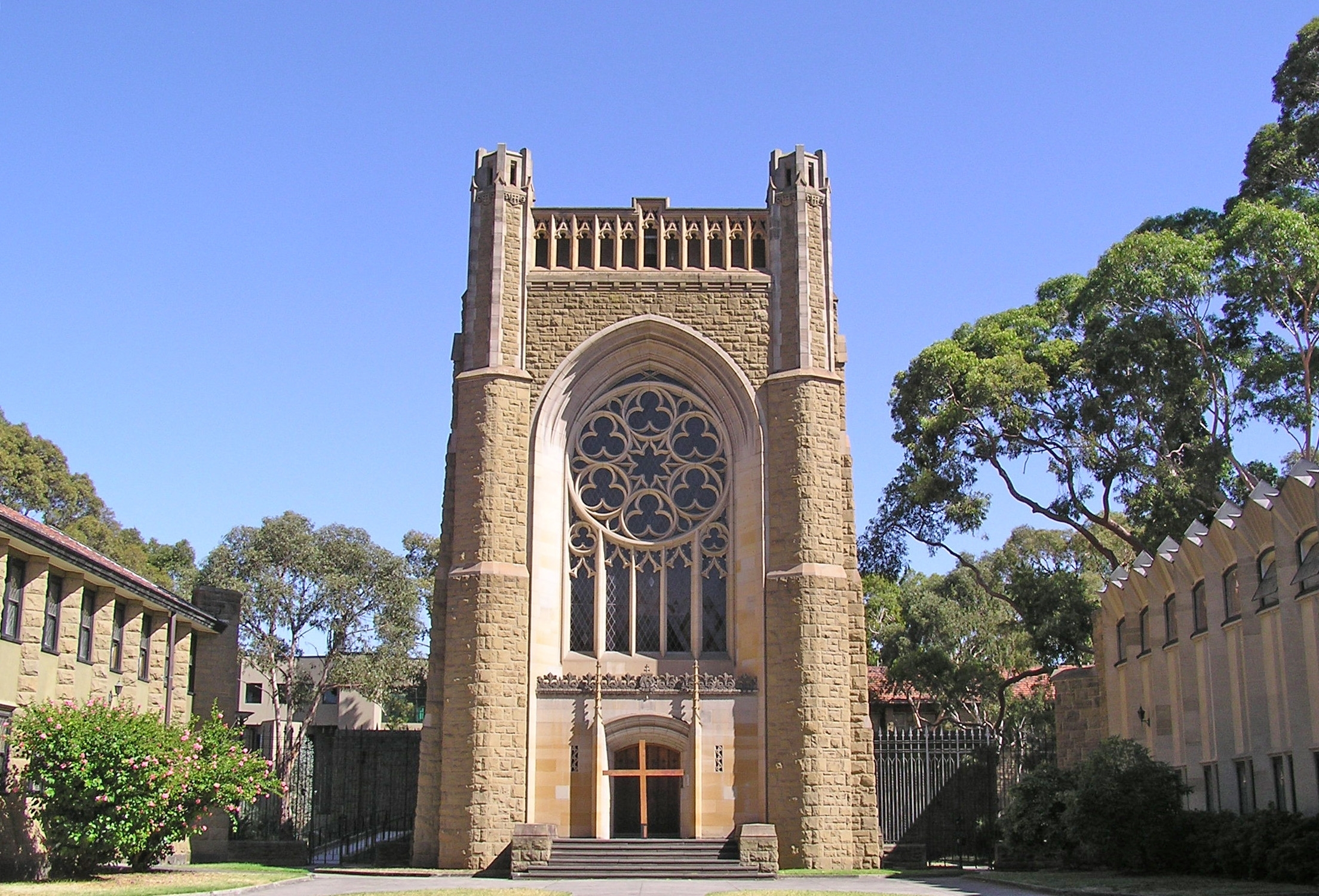
Newman College Chapel

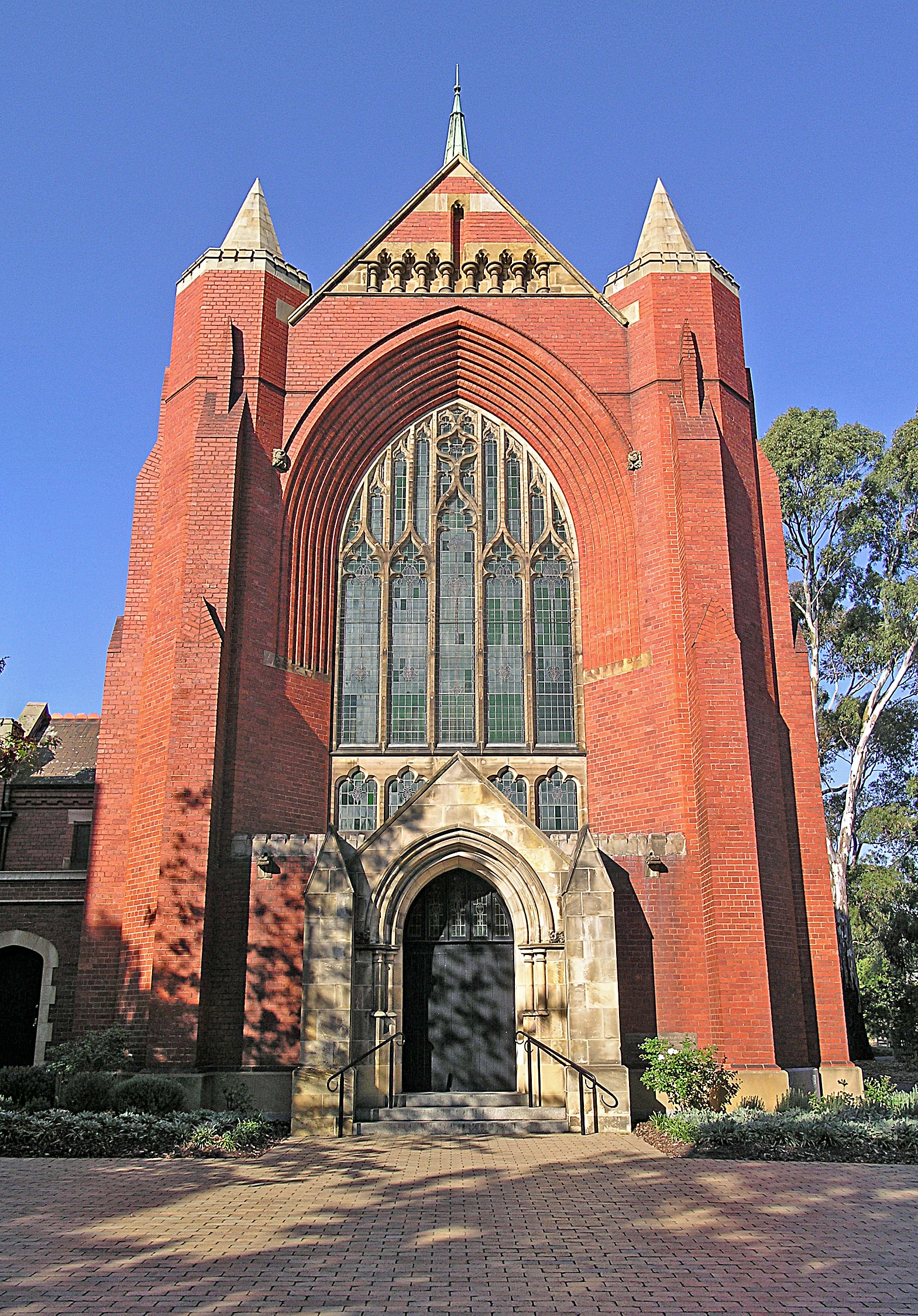
Trinity College Chapel

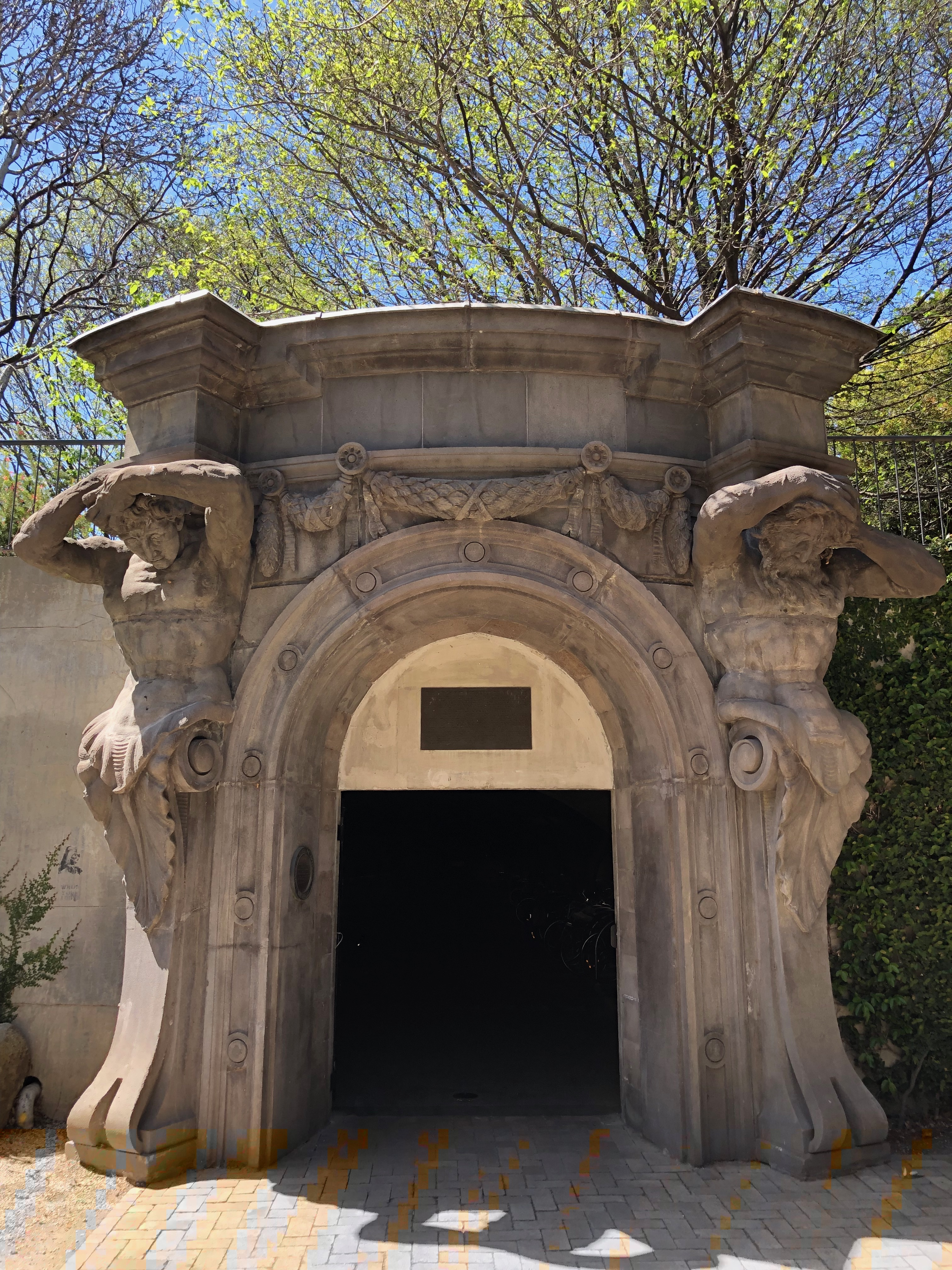
Entrance to South Lawn car park, originally from the Colonial Bank of Australasia headquarters in Melbourne city centre

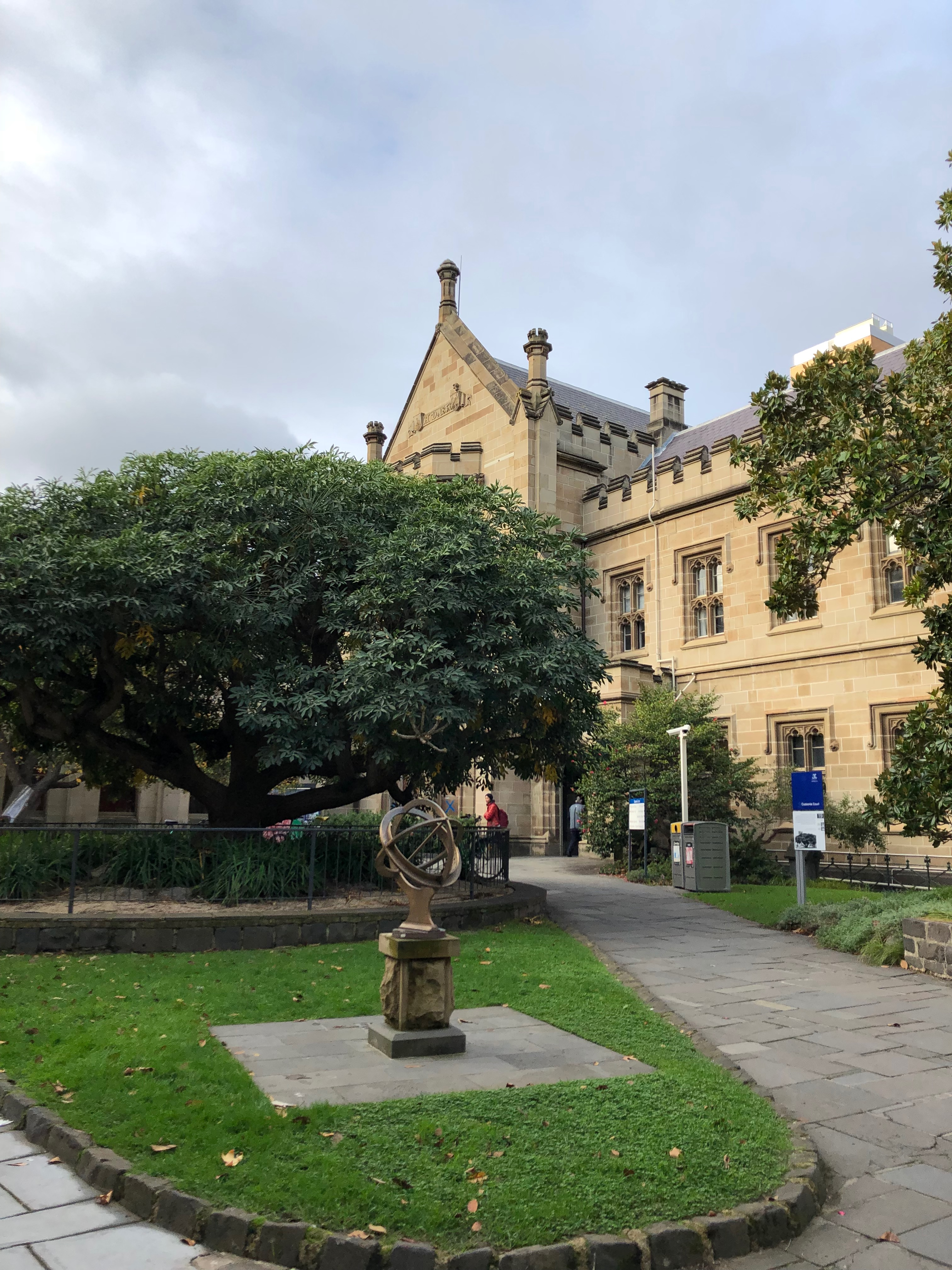
Cussonia Court

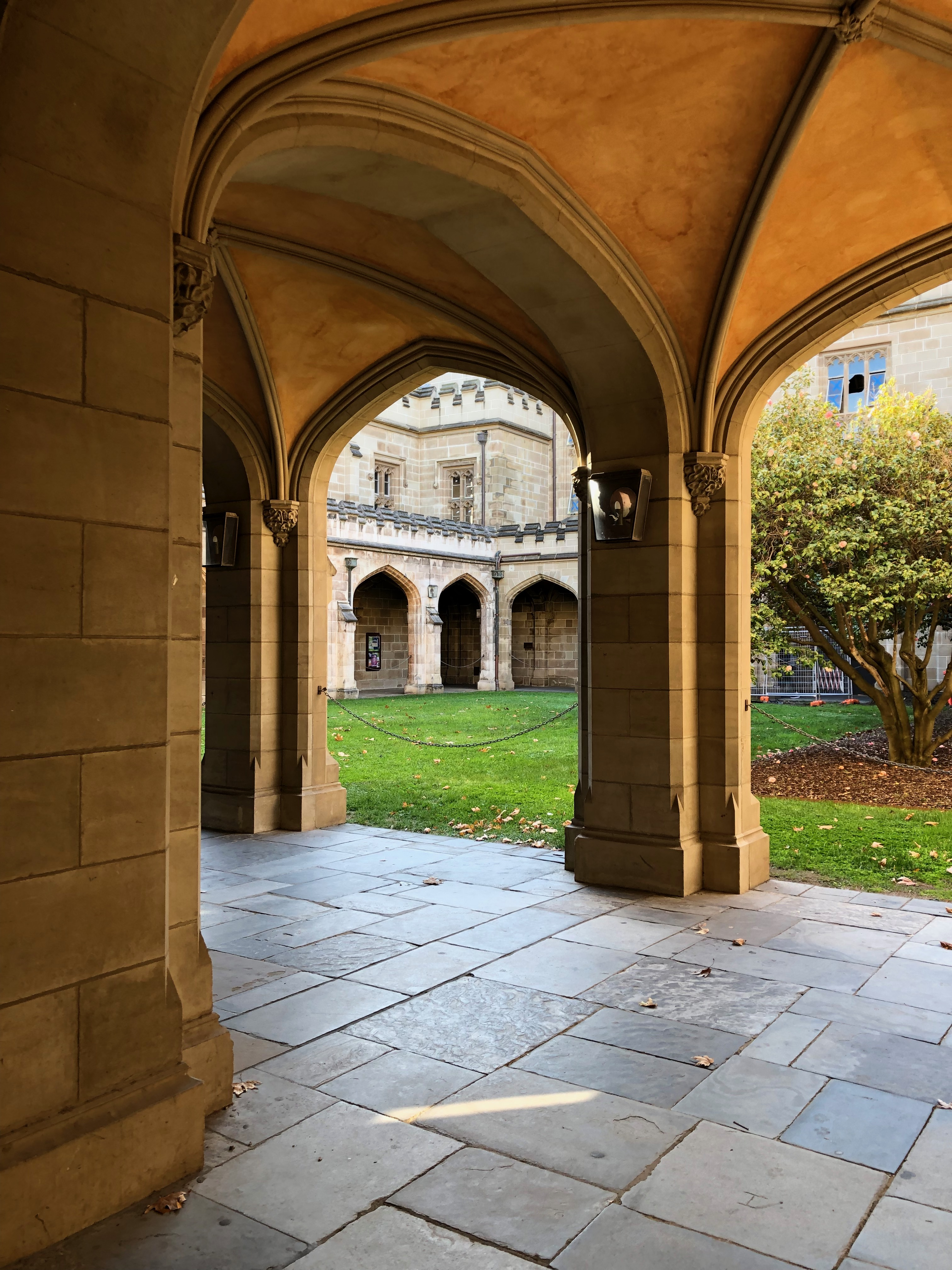
Southern colonnade, Old Quadrangle Building

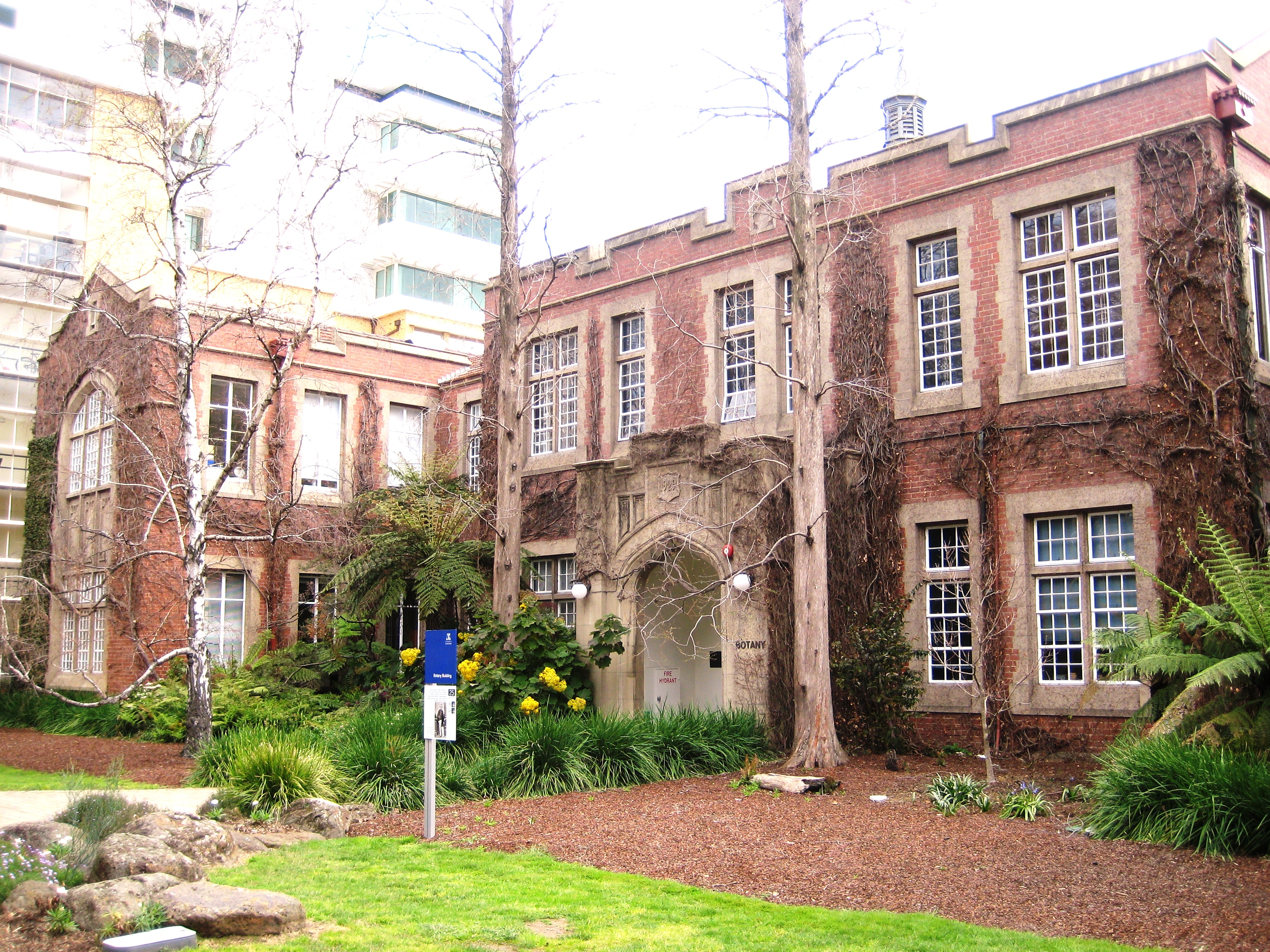
Biosciences 2 Building, originally called Botany Building (opened c. 1928). Parkville Campus of The University of Melbourne

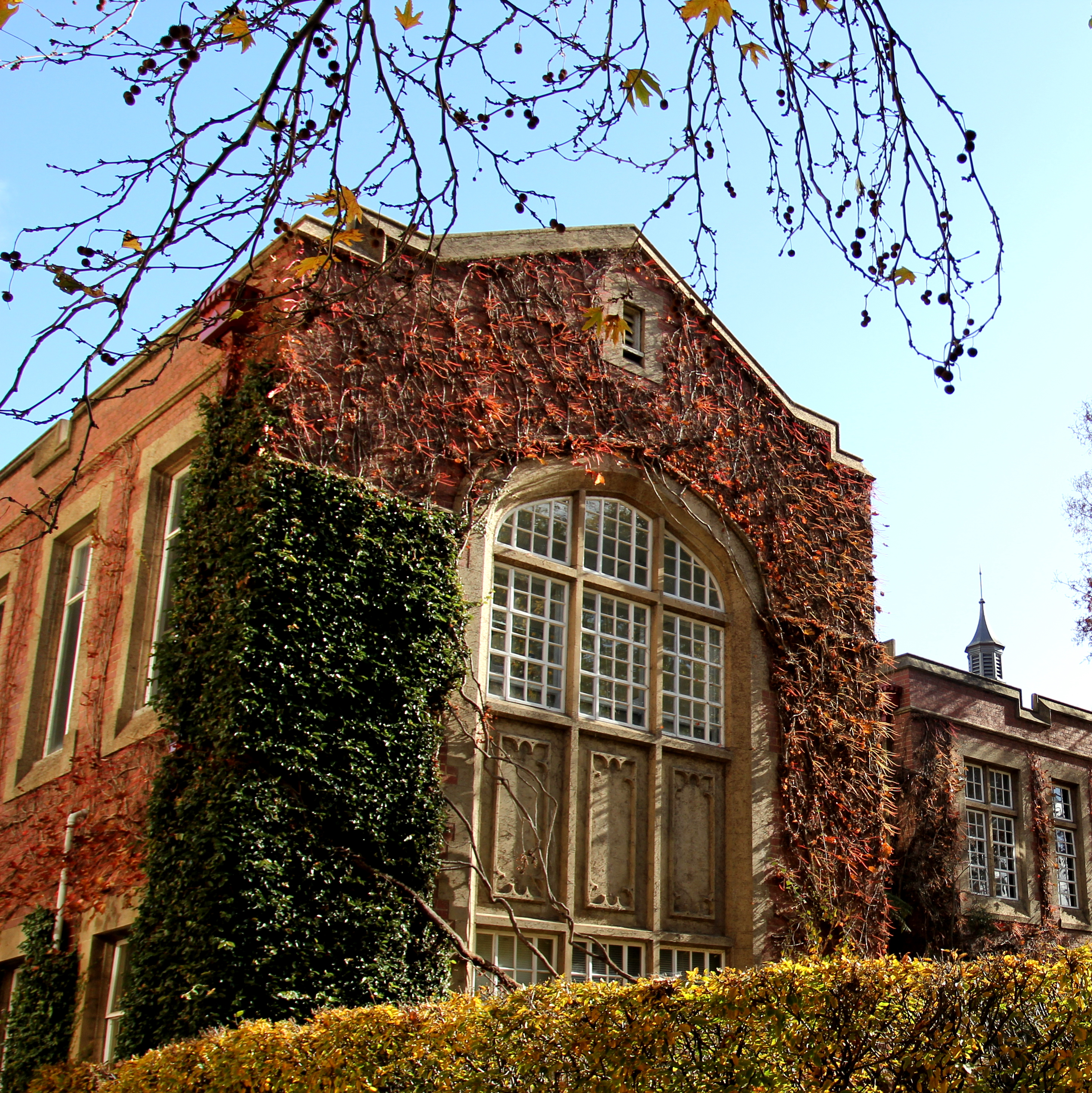
University of Melbourne ivy-covered exterior in autumn

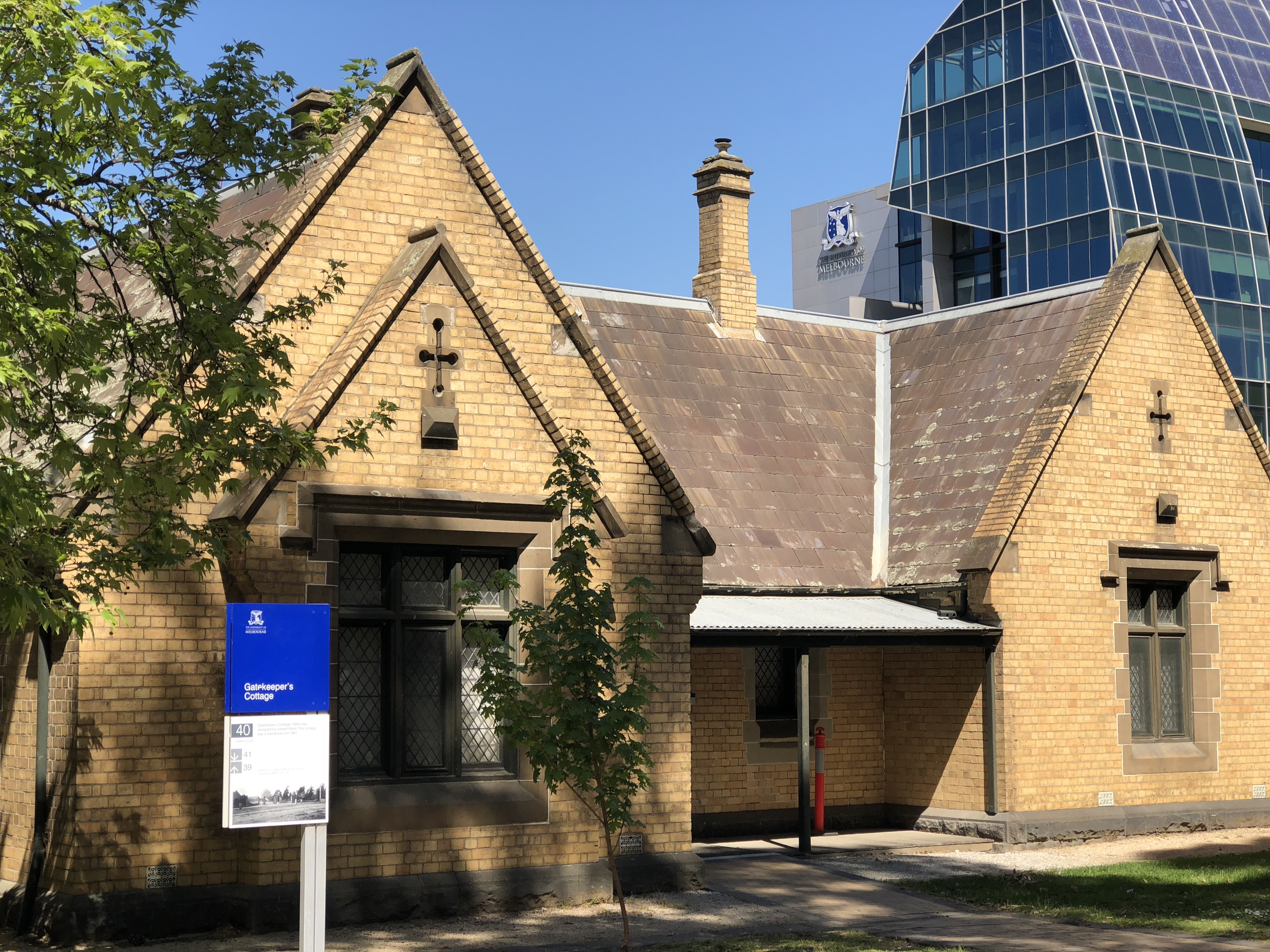
Gatekeeper's Cottage on Grattan Street

== See also ==
- Centre of Excellence for Biosecurity Risk Analysis (CEBRA) – within the School of Biosciences
- George Paton Gallery
- List of universities in Australia
- NICTA – national information and communication technology research centre, co-supported by Melbourne University
- Redmond Barry Distinguished Professor, which recognises outstanding professors
- University of Melbourne Academic Dress
- University of Melbourne Student Union
- Victorian School of Forestry
