= List of Australian businesspeople =

The economy of Australia is one of the most developed, modern market economies in the world and the most productive in South Pacific, with a GDP of approximately US$1.6 trillion. Australia's total wealth is 6.4 trillion dollars. In 2011, it was the 13th-largest national economy by nominal GDP. Businesspersons involved in different activities, whether commercial or industrial, for the purpose of generating revenue from a combination of human, financial, and physical capital are listed here.

== A ==
- Peter Abeles
- Stefan Ackerie
- George Adams
- Rodney Adler
- Ross Adler
- James Ainslie
- Karen Andrews
- Don Argus
- Geoffrey H. Arnott
- Halse Rogers Arnott

== B ==
- Reg Bartley
- Jean Battersby
- Maggie Beer
- Kevin Bermeister
- James Boag I
- James Boag II
- Shaun Bonett
- Richard Bowker
- Benjamin Boyd
- Andrew Brown
- Walter Bugno
- Peter Bush
- Charles Sinclair Butt
- Rod Butterss
- Nathan Buzza

== C ==
- David James Campbell
- Robert Campbell
- James Cavill
- Michael Chaney
- David S. Clarke
- Leigh Clifford
- George Coles
- Ian Collins
- John Connor
- Garrie Cooper
- Roger Corbett
- Chris Corrigan
- Owen Cox
- David Crawford
- Simon Currant

== D ==
- Douglas Daft
- John Davies
- Damien De Bohun
- William Detmold
- Geoff Dixon
- Ian Duffell
- Dick Dusseldorp

== E ==
- Rick Ellis

== F ==
- Rick Farley
- John Fletcher
- Andrew Forrest
- Lindsay Fox

== G ==
- John Gagliardi
- Lyall Gorman
- Ainsley Gotto
- John Grill
- Bruno Grollo
- Tim Gurner

== H ==
- Simon Hackett
- Walter Russell Hall
- Lang Hancock
- Arthur Hardy
- Wilhelm Harnisch
- Rick Hart
- Gerry Harvey
- David Hill
- Fred Hilmer
- Samuel Hordern
- Sean Howard
- Peter Hurley

== I ==
- Ronald Irish
- Clive Isenberg
- Peter Ivany

== J ==
- Kevin Jacobsen
- Neville Jeffress
- Graeme John
- Ian Johnson
- Barry Jones
- Charles Lloyd Jones

== K ==
- Con Kafataris
- Michael Kailis
- Kevin Kalkhoven
- Ben Keighran
- Steve Killelea
- Grant King
- Wallace King
- David Kingston
- Marius Kloppers
- Ron Knapp
- Ian Knop

== L ==
- Eve Laron
- John Lawes
- John Lazarou
- George Leake
- David Leckie
- Andrew Lindberg
- Paul Little
- Andrew Locke
- Geoff Lord
- James Robinson Love

== M ==
- Alexander MacRae
- Michael Malouf
- Gary March
- Henry Marcus Clark
- John Marlay
- George McCulloch
- John McFarlane
- Simon McKeon
- Kevin McQuay
- Rod Menzies
- Glen Milliner
- Rob Moodie
- Allan Moss
- John Mulcahy
- Ken Myer
- Sidney Myer

== N ==
- Charbel Nader

== O ==
- Trevor O'Hoy

== P ==
- Kerry Packer
- Clyde Packer
- Clive Palmer
- Rocco Pantaleo
- John Pascoe
- Nev Pask
- Jim Petrich
- Cillín Perera
- Gordon Pickard
- Harvie Picken
- JT Picken
- Andrew Plympton
- Nick Politis
- William Porteous
- Ian Potter

== R ==
- Cathie Reid
- Gina Rinehart
- Bill and Imelda Roche
- Edmund Rouse
- Trevor Rowe
- Mark Rowsthorn
- Peter Rowsthorn

== S ==
- Graeme Samuel
- George Sargent
- Ines Scotland
- Allan Scott
- Mark Selway
- John Singleton
- Maha Sinnathamby
- Steven Skala
- David Smorgon
- Graham Smorgon
- Victor Smorgon
- Robert Somervaille
- Malcolm Speed
- Kerry Stokes
- John Story
- Greg Swann
- Rudie Sypkes

== T ==
- Ken Talbot
- Tan Chin Nam
- Nick Tana
- Scott Taunton
- David Thodey
- Albert Toll
- Tina Tower
- Robert Towns
- Jim Truscott

== U ==
- James Underwood
- Joseph Underwood

== V ==
- Roelf Vos

== W ==
- Henry Waymouth
- Tony Wheeler
- Nicholas Whitlam
- Walter Worboys
- Charles William Wren

== Y ==
- Arthur Yates
- Edward Lowenstern Yencken
- William Younghusband

== Z ==
- Shi Zhengrong

== See also ==
- List of Australians by net worth
