= Rowsthorn =

Rowsthorn is a surname. Notable people with the surname include:

- Mark Rowsthorn, Australian businessman
- Peter Rowsthorn (actor) (born 1963), Australian stand-up comedian and actor
- Peter Rowsthorn (businessman) (born 1930), Australian businessman
