= Greenhouse Mafia =

Episode of Four Corners

"Greenhouse Mafia" is the title of a TV program aired by Australian network ABC on the 13 February 2006 episode of its weekly current affairs program Four Corners. The program says the term greenhouse mafia is the "in house" name used by Australia’s carbon lobby for itself. The program featured former Liberal Party member Guy Pearse and Four Corners host Janine Cohen, while others concerned about the influence exerted by the fossil fuel lobby also participated. The report was based on a thesis Pearse wrote at the Australian National University between 1999 and 2005 regarding the response of Australian business to global warming. According to the program, lobby groups representing the coal, car, oil, and aluminium industries have wielded their power to prevent Australia from reducing its greenhouse gas emissions, which were already among the highest per capita in the world in 1990.

== Research by Pearse ==
According to the research of Pearse, lobby groups representing the largest fossil fuel producing or consuming industries referred to themselves as the 'Greenhouse Mafia.' These groups are represented in Canberra by the Australian Industry Greenhouse Network (AIGN). AIGN members told Pearse in recorded interviews how they routinely gained access to what should be confidential information concerning government policy on energy and transport. Pearse cited recorded interviews with AIGN members and said that lobbyists had written cabinet submissions, ministerial briefings, and costings in two departments on at least half a dozen occasions over a decade.

According to Pearse, the consequence of the "Greenhouse Mafia" having this access is that those within groups lobbying for unrestricted greenhouse gas emissions have been able to ensure that government ministers hear mostly matching advice from their own departmental officials. Pearse says that this influence is entrenched to such an extent that fossil fuel industry lobby groups have actually been writing Australia's greenhouse policy at least since the Kyoto Protocol in 1998, and probably even before John Howard became Prime Minister in 1996.

== Four Corners program ==
The "Greenhouse Mafia" episode of Four Corners begins by reviewing the evidence Pearse assembled during his PhD research, and questions a political science academic, a senior federal bureaucrat, the Federal Environment Minister and a representative of the industry peak body, the Australian Industry Greenhouse Network, about their responses to Pearse's allegations.

The episode then moves onto a series of interviews with climate scientists who currently or formerly worked for CSIRO. One of these scientists, the former CSIRO Climate Director and Chief of Atmospheric Research, Dr Graeme Pearman, alleges that scientists at CSIRO were instructed by management that they were not permitted to speak publicly on the policy implications of climate change, and that he had been repeatedly censored in the years immediately preceding his forced redundancy from CSIRO in 2004.

Another former CSIRO scientist, Barney Foran, recounts an incident in August 2005, when, after giving a few radio interviews about ethanol, he received a phone call from a staff member in CSIRO's corporate centre who claimed to be passing on a direct request from the Prime Minister's Department that "They'd really appreciate it if you didn't say anything about ethanol." Dr Foran and Dr Pearman argue that the Howard Federal Government was sensitive to CSIRO scientists placing government policies on climate change in an unfavorable light. They also claim that the censorship of their views in recent years was completely unlike anything they had experienced in over thirty years working for the organisation.

== Clive Hamilton's perspective ==
Following the "Greenhouse Mafia" report by Four Corners, a talk was given on 20 February 2006 by Clive Hamilton, the director of the Australia Institute and one of Guy Pearse's PhD supervisors, elaborating more on the "Greenhouse Mafia". The talk described a "dirty dozen", a group of climate change deniers with considerable influence over Australian policy. The members of this dirty dozen included Hugh Morgan, John Eyles, Ron Knapp, Alan Oxley, Peter Walsh, Meg McDonald, Barry Jones, Chris Mitchell, Ian Macfarlane, Alan Moran, Malcolm Broomhead and John Howard. The talk said that the "Greenhouse Mafia" is predominantly representative of the coal, oil, cement, aluminium, mining and electricity industries

== Later publications ==
In July 2007, Pearse released his own book on the subject, High & Dry: John Howard, Climate Change and the Selling of Australia’s Future. In early 2007 Hamilton expanded on his own views in his book titled Scorcher: The Dirty Politics of Climate Change, drawing heavily on Pearse’s research.

Pearse and Hamilton have cited various examples of "Greenhouse Mafia" influence on the Howard government's response to Climate Change. One of the best documented examples involved a group called the Lower Emissions Technology Advisory Group (LETAG). Reports of a secret meeting of the group with John Howard and representatives of the Government of Australia in May 2004 appeared in The Age in October 2004. LETAG consists of the leaders of some fossil fuel companies and energy intensive industries, including Rio Tinto, Edison Mission Energy, BHP Billiton, Alcoa and Orica. The minutes of the meeting were leaked and described how both groups worried that Australia's mandatory renewable energy target (MRET) was "work[ing] too well" and were "market skewed" towards wind power.

== Media references ==
- Geoffrey Barker, journalist and author, made mention of the Four Corners "Greenhouse Mafia" program in relation to a discussion on the politicisation of the Australian public service.

== See also ==
- Requiem for a Species
- Mark Diesendorf
- Lonie Report
