= Peter Rowsthorn =

Peter Rowsthorn may refer to:

- Peter Rowsthorn (actor) (born 1963), Australian actor and comedian
- Peter Rowsthorn (businessman) (1930–2021), Australian businessman
