= Barry Jones (executive) =

Barry Jones is the former chief executive of the Australian Petroleum Production and Exploration Association (APPEA).

== Dirty Dozen ==
In a speech given in Adelaide on 20 February 2006, Clive Hamilton (director of The Australia Institute) identified Jones as one of Australia's climate change "dirty dozen" (or Greenhouse Mafia), a group of climate change deniers with considerable influence over Australian Government policy (others are : Hugh Morgan, John Eyles (AIGN), Ron Knapp, Alan Oxley, Peter Walsh, Chris Mitchell, Meg McDonald, Barry Jones (former head APPEA), Ian MacFarlane, Alan Moran, Malcolm Broomhead, and John Howard).
