= John Mulcahy =

John Mulcahy may refer to:

- John Mulcahy (businessman), former Australian CEO of various listed companies
- John Mulcahy (journalist), Irish founder of The Phoenix magazine.
- John Mulcahy (rower), American gold-medal Olympic rower.
- John Mulcahy (industrialist), 19th century Irish woollen manufacturer.
