= John Picken =

John Picken may refer to:

- Jack Picken, Scottish footballer
- John Picken (tennis), Canadian tennis player
- John Harvie Picken, Australian businessman
