= International Aluminium Institute =

Organization in London, United Kingdom

- Formation: 1972
- Type: trade association
- Headquarters: London, UK
- Region served: Worldwide
- Website: international-aluminium.org

The International Aluminum Institute (IAI) is the global trade association for the primary aluminum industry, including bauxite, alumina, and aluminum producers, recyclers, and processors. Its main tasks are to collect and publish comprehensive industry data, to serve as the authoritative source for industry statistics, promote collaboration on sustainability initiatives, and represent the industry's role in a circular economy. The IAI also serves as a focus for promoting the aluminum industry worldwide and sharing best industry practices. The organization works closely with national aluminum associations and lobbies, but these are not members of the IAI itself.

The members of the IAI represent 60% of global bauxite, alumina, and aluminium production. The Organization was founded in 1972 as the International Primary Aluminium Institute. The IAI is headquartered in London, United Kingdom.

== Members ==
As of August 2025, the IAI had the following members:

- Alcoa
- Aluar
- Aluminerie Alouette
- Aluminium Bahrain
- Aluminum Corporation of China
- Companhia Brasileira de Alumínio
- DADCO Alumina & Chemicals
- Emirates Global Aluminium
- Hindalco Industries
- Norsk Hydro
- Mitsubishi Corporation
- Mitsui Bussan
- METLEN Energy and Metals
- Nippon Light Metal
- Qatalum
- Rio Tinto Group
- Maʿaden
- Shandong Innovation Group
- Sohar Aluminium
- South32
- State Power Investment Corporation
- Rusal
- Vedanta Resources

== See also ==
- List of largest aluminum producers by output
