= Peko-Wallsend =

Australian mining company

- Industry: Mining
- Founded: 1961
- Defunct: 1988

Peko-Wallsend was an Australian mining company.

== History ==
Peko-Wallsend was founded in 1961 when Peko Mines merged with Wallsend Investments. In 1962 Peko-Wallsend purchased Toll Transport. In January 1968, Peko-Wallsend acquired a majority shareholding in the Mount Morgan Mine.

In May 1979, Sims Metal was acquired. In December 1979, Peko-Wallsend acquired a 25% stake in the Ranger Uranium Mine.

In 1986, Toll Transport was sold in a management buyout to Paul Little and Peter Rowsthorn. In 1988 Peko Wallsend was taken over by North Limited.
