= Global Express =

Global Express may refer to:

- Bombardier Global Express, a business jet
- Global Xpress, a satellite internet service by Inmarsat
- Team Global Express, formerly Toll Global Express
