= Malcolm Broomhead =

Australian businessman (born 1952)

Malcolm William Broomhead AO (born 11 September 1952) is an Australian businessman who has held various directorships and senior positions in the Australian engineering, industrial and resources sectors. As of 2018, he is a director of BHP and Chairman of Orica. Journalist Andrew Crook wrote of Broomhead in 2012 that "nobody is more connected in Australian business".

== Career ==
Broomhead attained a BE and an MBA at the University of Queensland in the 1980s.

During his career in the engineering, industrial and resources sectors, Broomhead held senior management positions with Halcrow (UK), MIM Holdings, Peko-Wallsend, Industrial Equity and North Limited. At North Limited, he acted as managing director and chief executive officer.

Broomhead was appointed managing director and Chief Executive of Orica Limited in 2001; a position he held until September 2005.

He left Orica in 2005 to undertake treatment for cancer.

In the late 2000s, he acted as Chairman of Asciano Limited (2009–2016) and a Director of Coates Group Holdings Pty. Ltd. (2008–2013) .

Broomhead joined BHP Billiton as a non-executive director in 2010, and was appointed chairman of the company's sustainability committee in 2017.

In December 2015 he returned to Orica as a non-executive director and in 2016 was appointed chairman.

=== Other roles ===
Broomhead was appointed Director of the Walter and Eliza Hall Institute of Medical Research in July 2014, Chairman of the Australia China One Belt One Road Advisory Board in August 2016, and is a council member of Opportunity International Australia.

Broomhead made a $3 million philanthropic contribution to the University of Queensland to establish its first Chair of Finance.

He is a member of Australia's "Greenhouse Mafia".

=== Awards and recognition ===
In the 2019 Australia Day Honours Broomhead was made an Officer of the Order of Australia (AO) for "distinguished service to business and mining, and through financial support for education and medical research".

== Personal life ==
Broomhead is a cancer survivor.
