= Let the Blood Run Free =

Australian TV comedy series (1990–1994)

- Genre: Soap opera
- Created by: The Blood Group
- Written by: The Blood Group
- Directed by: John Thomson
- Country of origin: Australia
- Original language: English
- No. of series: 2
- No. of episodes: 26

Production
- Executive producer: Ian McFadyen
- Producer: Bobbie Waterman
- Running time: 30 minutes
- Production company: A Media Arts Production

Original release
- Network: Ten Network
- Release: 20 August 1990 – 15 January 1994

Let the Blood Run Free was an anarchic Australian spoof television soap opera set in the fictional St Christopher's Hospital and created by comedy collective The Blood Group, based on their theatrical comedy revue. Directed by John Thomson, the show ran for two series on Network Ten, August 1990 – January 1994.

It was one of the first interactive TV programs, where the audience could vote on The Young Doctors -style skits. One episode included a parody of the cult series Prisoner (aka Prisoner: Cell Block H ).

== Conception ==
The show was originally conceived as a live weekly event for the upstairs venue Le Joke of the Melbourne comedy venue The Last Laugh. Tory McBride, then the associate producer of comedy at the venue, came up with the concept and the title and in association with comedy director John Thomson, put together the team which was to become The Blood Group. The show was very loosely scripted and then improvised on stage, with two planned storylines depending on live audience voting.

The live Le Joke version, which had a continuous weekly run for about a year, was a success with audience members returning every Thursday evening to see the next episode. Before long, it had become too big for the 100-seat Le Joke theatre, and was moved downstairs for several seasons on the main stage of the Last Laugh.

There was also a radio version of the show.

== Television ==
Let The Blood Run Free was subsequently picked up for television and 26 episodes were produced using a number of the storylines developed during the stage shows. They aired in Australia from 20 August 1990 to 15 January 1994 and in the UK on Channel 4 from 29 August 1992 to 7 January 1995. The show featured the original cast including Kath & Kim actor Peter Rowsthorn in the early role of hospital orderly Warren Cronkshonk.

The series was sold to broadcast in 70 countries. It was particularly popular in Germany, who financed the second season.

It is thought to be one of the first interactive television series ever made – in keeping with the live version, at the end of each episode the viewers could vote by telephone to decide the direction the storylines would take. It was also unusual in its lack of respect for television conventions, breaking the fourth wall by turning to the camera and directly addressing the viewers.

== Cast ==
In keeping with the spoof nature of the series each character had a name that was either a pun or extreme.

- Jean Kittson as Nurse Pam Sandwich, who became Pam Good-Sandwich on marrying Ray and Pam Good-Lovechild-Sandwich on marrying Richard
- Helen Knight as Nurse Effie Shunt, who also played Dr Angie Travers and Matron's long-lost daughter Moon Unit.
- Brian Nankervis as Dr. Ray Good
- David Swann as Dr. Richard Lovechild
- Lynda Gibson as Matron Dorothy Conniving-Bitch
- Peter Rowsthorn as Warren Cronkshonk, who also played axe-murderer Bill Schwarzenhameneggenberger.
- Mark Cutler as Inspector George Slabb – pronounced Slab-ub, because of the double "b". Cutler originally played Richard in the stage version, but was unavailable for the start of the TV series, hence the casting of Swann in the role.

== Stories ==
The stories were as over-the-top as the acting; Pam and Ray discovering they are brother and sister – just after they get married and Pam announces her pregnancy; Effie being run over by St Christopher in a VW campervan and squashed flat, only to be brought back from the dead in Series 2 by Ray and her boyfriend Warren; Matron Dorothy Conniving-Bitch teaming up with her long-lost axe-murdering lover Bill Schwarzenhameneggenberger to destroy Pam and Ray's relationship; the vampire Carla Laboumdier falling for Ray, meanwhile stalking the staff, until her eventual staking by Ray.
