= Shandong Innovation Group =

- Type: Private
- Industry: Metals
- Founded: 2002; 24 years ago
- Headquarters: Binzhou, China
- Products: Aluminum
- Revenue: CN¥120 billion (2024)
- Website: www.siginnovation.com

Shandong Innovation Group Co., Ltd. (SIG) is one of the world's largest fully integrated aluminum alloy manufacturers, with over 20,000 employees and a total annual production capacity of more than 5 million tons. The company is located in Zouping City, Binzhou, Shandong Province, China.

== History ==
The company was founded in 2002 and now has more than 20 subsidiaries worldwide, including Innovation New Material Technology Co., Ltd. (SH.600361), which is listed on the Shanghai Stock Exchange. It is one of the 500 largest companies in China. Its product portfolio includes aluminum oxide, electrolytic aluminum, flat-rolled products, extruded profiles, cables and wires, and light alloy wheels, which are used in industries such as electronics, automotive, renewable energy, construction, and power supply.

Shandong Innovation Sheet Materials Co., Ltd. was established in June 2008 as a holding subsidiary of Innovation New Materials Technology Co., Ltd. with a registered capital of 300 million yuan. The company has two subsidiaries, Shandong Innovation Foil Technology Co., Ltd. and Shandong Innovation Precision Aluminum Metal Manufacturing Co., Ltd., with a total of over 2,400 employees. The company is primarily engaged in the research and development, production, and sales of high-precision aluminum plates and foils.

As one of the largest manufacturers of aluminum alloys, Shandong Innovation Group currently consists of over 10 industrial parks, which house the group's subsidiaries.

In 2023, the company signed contracts to supply technology, combustion and control systems for 27 tilting melting furnaces with a capacity of 70 tons to Gautschi.

Since 2024, the Swedish group Gränges has been cooperating with the Chinese Shandong Innovation Group on the construction of an aluminum recycling and casting plant in Yunnan.

== See also ==
- List of largest aluminum producers by output
