= Guy Pearse =

Australian whistleblower

Guy Pearse is an Australian author and former Research Fellow at the Global Change Institute at the University of Queensland. His first book titled High & Dry: John Howard, climate change and the selling of Australia's future was published in 2007. In 2009, Pearse published a critique of the Rudd government's response to climate change in Quarterly Essay 33: Quarry Vision: Coal, Climate Change and the End of the Resources Boom. In 2012, he published Greenwash: Big Brands and Carbon Scams – an analysis of whether the climate-friendly revolution being advertised by large multinationals is real.

== Biography ==
Guy Pearse worked for various Liberal politicians, as a lobbyist for numerous industries, and as a consultant to the Australian Greenhouse Office. He was speechwriter for Australian Prime Minister John Howard's first environment minister, Robert Hill. While studying at Harvard Kennedy School at Harvard University in the mid-1990s, Pearse worked on the advance staff of then U.S. Vice President Al Gore.

Pearse's doctoral research at the Australian National University focussed on the influence of the carbon lobby on the Howard government. This thesis became the basis for the "Greenhouse Mafia" episode of ABC's Four Corners in February 2006.

== See also ==
- Greenhouse Mafia
