= Australian Greenhouse Office =

Former environmental agency in Australia

The Australian Greenhouse Office (AGO) was formed in 1998 within the Government of Australia as a stand-alone agency within the environment portfolio to provide a whole of government approach to greenhouse matters. It was the world's first government agency dedicated to cutting greenhouse gas emissions, managed Australia's response to climate change, and provided government-sanctioned information to the public.

Writer Guy Pearse was employed by the agency as a consultant. David Evans was employed by the office from 1999 to 2005 to conduct carbon accounting and to build models.

== History ==
The agency was responsible for administering the Energy Star program in Australia and provided funds for a fuel cell bus trial in Perth. An auditing method was developed to assist local councils to improve the energy efficiency of their lighting, heating, ventilation and air-conditioning.

In 2001, the Australian Greenhouse Office introduced the Australian Minimum Energy Performance Standards (MEPS), which were revised in 2006 to a more stringent level.

In 2004, it became part of the Department of the Environment and Heritage. Following the 2007 federal election, the functions of AGO were split between the new Department of Climate Change and the Department of the Environment, Water, Heritage and the Arts. In March 2010, the remainder of the AGO functions- the (Renewable Energy Efficiency Division) was moved to DCC, creating the new Department of Climate Change and Energy Efficiency.

== See also ==
- Climate change in Australia
- Effects of global warming on Australia
- Renewable energy in Australia
