= Jane Hansen (businesswoman) =

Australian business executive

Jane Hansen AO

23rd Chancellor of the University of Melbourne
- Incumbent
- Assumed office 1 January 2023
- Preceded by: Allan Myers

Personal details
- Born: Jane Caroline Hansen
- Spouse: Paul Little
- Education: Monash University; Columbia University; University of Melbourne
- Occupation: Chancellor, business executive, philanthropist
- Website: www.little.com.au

Jane Hansen AO is an Australian investment banker, business executive and philanthropist. She was appointed the 23rd chancellor of the University of Melbourne on 1 January 2023.

== Education ==
Jane Hansen graduated from Monash University with a Bachelor of Economics and then studied for a Master of Finance and Business Administration at Columbia University in New York. After working for some time in corporate finance, she completed a Bachelor of Arts (History) at the University of Melbourne.

== Career ==
After completing her business degrees, Hansen worked for more than 20 years as a corporate finance expert with Macquarie Bank and First Boston/Credit Suisse.

== Other roles ==
Hansen was initially appointed to the University of Melbourne Council on 1 January 2016 and was deputy chancellor of the University of Melbourne since 2017. She was appointed the 23rd Chancellor of the University of Melbourne on 1 January 2023.

As of 2024 she is CEO and chair of the Hansen Little Foundation, Chair of the Melbourne Theatre Company, chair of the University of Melbourne Campaign Advisory Board, member of the advisory board for the Melbourne Humanities Foundation, and board member of Opera Australia.

She was appointed to the board of The Lord Mayor's Charitable Foundation in 2017, and is on the board as of April 2024.

She is also a member of Chief Executive Women and the Australian Institute of Company Directors.

== Philanthropy ==
In 2014, Hansen joined the board of the Melbourne Theatre Company. The following year she established the Melbourne Theatre Company Foundation, as its first chair. In 2016, she and her husband, Paul Little, donated AU$1million to the Foundation. In December 2019, she became chair of the Melbourne Theatre Company.

In 2022 Hansen partnered with Chief Executive Women to create two new scholarships for women who lead in the arts community: the Hansen Executive Leader CEW Scholarship and the Hansen CEW Leaders Program for the Arts Scholarships. The former is for one recipient, to study a leadership course of their choice anywhere in the world, while the latter offers five recipients to participate in the CEW Leaders Program.

In 2023, in a philanthropic partnership with the University of Melbourne, Hansen and husband Paul Little established the Hansen Scholarship, worth A$108,000. The annual scholarship, which will run for an initial 40 years, welcomed its inaugural cohort in 2020.

== Honours and awards ==
In the 2020 Australia Day Honours, Hansen was appointed an Officer of the Order of Australia for "distinguished service to the community, to education and cultural institutions, and through philanthropic support for charitable foundations".

In 2020, Hansen made a donation to the History Council of Victoria who, in recognition, has inaugurated the Jane Hansen Prize for History Advocacy awarded annually since 2021.

Academic offices
Preceded by Allan Myers	Chancellor of the University of Melbourne; 2023–present	Incumbent
