= Shandong Xinfa Aluminium Group =

- Company type: Private
- Industry: Metals
- Founded: 1972; 54 years ago
- Headquarters: Jining, China
- Website: xinfaalum.com

The Xinfa Group, also known as Shandong Xinfa Aluminum Group (or just Xinfa), was the world's fourth-largest aluminum producer in terms of production in 2024 and the third-largest in China. Thanks to an extensive supply chain, the Xinfa Group has a capacity of 3.6 million tons, more than half of which, around 1.9 million tons, is produced in the Xinjiang region.

== History ==
Founded in 1972 and headquartered in Shandong Province, Xinfa Group now has 73 subsidiaries specializing in power generation, aluminum oxide, refining, carbon production, and the manufacture of aluminum products. Its most important assets include companies such as Chipping Huaxin Aluminum Industry, Shandong Xinfa Hope Aluminum (under the East Hope Group), and Guangxi Xinfa Aluminum.

With 3.7 million tons of the light metal aluminum, Xinfa ranked fourth among the world's largest aluminum producers in 2024.

== Criticism ==
Xinfa has been criticized as a low-cost producer that pays little attention to environmental standards, particularly with regard to the toxic by-products produced during the processing of the raw material bauxite (red mud).

== See also ==
- List of largest aluminum producers by output
