= Paul Little (businessman) =

Australian businessman and philanthropist

Paul Alexander Little AO
- Occupations: Businessman (retired); Philanthropist
- Known for: Toll Holdings (1985-2011); Paul Little Racing (1998-2005)
- Board member of: Chairman, Essendon FC (2013-2015)
- Spouses: Shirley Little (1978-1992); Jane Hansen (m. 1994)

Paul Alexander Little AO is an Australian businessman and philanthropist. Little served as the managing director of Toll Holdings, an Australasian integrated logistics provider from 1985 until 2011 and retired from that position after 26 years service.

== Career ==
Little has been in the transport industry for nearly all his business life, first as an employee at Mayne Nickless, where he progressed to become national operations manager of the Seapak Transport Services division, and then at Peko-Wallsend as a consultant where he assessed the desirability of purchasing the Toll business and then led the takeover which went on to become a prominent Australian transport services provider.

=== Toll Holdings ===
In 1985, Little, along with businessmen Peter Rowsthorn as well as Rowsthorn's son, Mark Rowsthorn, and Lyall McLachlan, led a management buyout team which purchased Toll Holdings which in 1993 listed on the Australian Securities Exchange.

Little and his team developed Toll from an 18-truck operation worth $1.5 million, into a $3.8 billion international organisation with 45,000 employees and operations in 50 countries. As a result of his involvement in Toll Holdings, Little has become one of Australia's richest men. Little subsequently further developed his ability to acquire new businesses, buying many between 1989 and 2000. He then began taking over two companies a year until 1997, when Toll paid $145 million for eight TNT businesses. In 2000, it paid $120 million for rival Finemore Holdings.

Little also oversaw Toll's investments in technology, wine, rail freight and cargo shipping.

=== Little Projects ===
In 2011, Little founded Little Projects, a residential and commercial property projects group. His business philosophy is to provide a 'one-stop shop' approach, where clients deal with the one entity for all their real estate requirements encompassing buying, selling and comprehensive property management. To this end Little has purchased a range of complementary businesses including three LJ Hooker real estate franchises. He has a large number of projects underway in Melbourne with a value of over $1 billion.

=== Other business interests ===
Little also owns an aviation charter business, Little Aviation, which, as of 2013, owned an A$65 million Gulfstream G650ER jet. Little Aviation employs three pilots.

=== Sports management ===
Little has been prominently involved in Australian professional sport. Initially in motor racing, Little sponsored John Sidney Racing and Anthony Tratt's Porsche racing team. In 1998 Tratt's team moved into V8 Supercars under Little's ownership as Paul Little Racing. The team folded in 2005 after eight seasons of racing. Little also personally raced competitively but was discouraged by his fellow board members at Toll Holdings due to the danger.

On 29 July 2013, Little became the chairman of the Essendon Football Club in the AFL, replacing David Evans. He served in the role for almost two and a half years, presiding over a turbulent time in the club's history as it faced allegations of running a program of illegal supplements during David Evans' tenure. Little stepped down on 14 December 2015, shortly before the final guilty verdict was returned in the supplements investigation, and was replaced by Lindsay Tanner.

=== Awards and honours ===
- Winner of the CA/Zurich Business Leader Award in 2002
- Winner of the inaugural Trans-Tasman Business Leader Award in 2005
- Awarded a Doctor of Business honoris causa by RMIT University in 2008
- Appointed Officer of the Order of Australia (AO) in 2010 for service to the development of the transport and logistics industries through strategic leadership and promotion of corporate social and environmental responsibility, and to the community through philanthropic support of sporting and medical research organisations.

Little is also a Fellow of the Australian Institute of Company Directors and a Fellow of the Chartered Institute of Logistics and Transport (FCILT).

== Personal life ==
Little is married to former investment banker, Jane Hansen, his second wife. In 2002, they paid a then record price for a Melbourne home when they bought the Toorak mansion Coonac for nearly A$15 million. Little's first wife, Shirley, died of cancer in 1992. Little has three children.

Little and Hansen's philanthropic interests are directed towards education, theatre, and addiction rehabilitation. In 2015 Little and Hansen established The Hansen Trust via an A$10 million gift from the Hansen Little Foundation to the University of Melbourne to further the teaching of history studies. In 2018 the Hansen Little Foundation gifted a further A$30 million to the university.

=== Net worth ===
Year	Financial Review Rich List		Forbes Australia's 50 Richest	
Year	Rank	Net worth (AUD)	Rank	Net worth (USD)
2013		$0.88 billion		
2014			37	
2015			37	$0.82 billion ▲
2016			31 ▲	$0.83 billion ▲
2017		$0.927 billion		
2018	50 ▲	$1.54 billion ▲		
2019	45 ▲	$1.77 billion ▲	40 ▼	$0.95 billion ▲
2020	59 ▼	$1.67 billion ▼		
2021	67 ▼	$1.71 billion ▲		
2022	69 ▼	$1.80 billion ▼		
2023	76 ▼	$1.83 billion ▲		
2024	63 ▲	$2.25 billion ▲		
2025	70 ▼	$2.34 billion ▲		

Legend
Icon	Description
Steady	Has not changed from the previous year
▲	Has increased from the previous year
▼	Has decreased from the previous year
