= Ron Finemore Transport =

- Formerly: Lewington's Transport
- Industry: Logistics
- Founded: 1949; 77 years ago
- Founder: Jack Lewington
- Headquarters: Wodonga, Australia
- Owner: Ron Finemore
- Number of employees: 900 (2025)
- Website: www.ronfinemoretransport.com.au

Ron Finemore Transport, formerly Lewington's Transport, is a major Australian logistics company.

== History ==
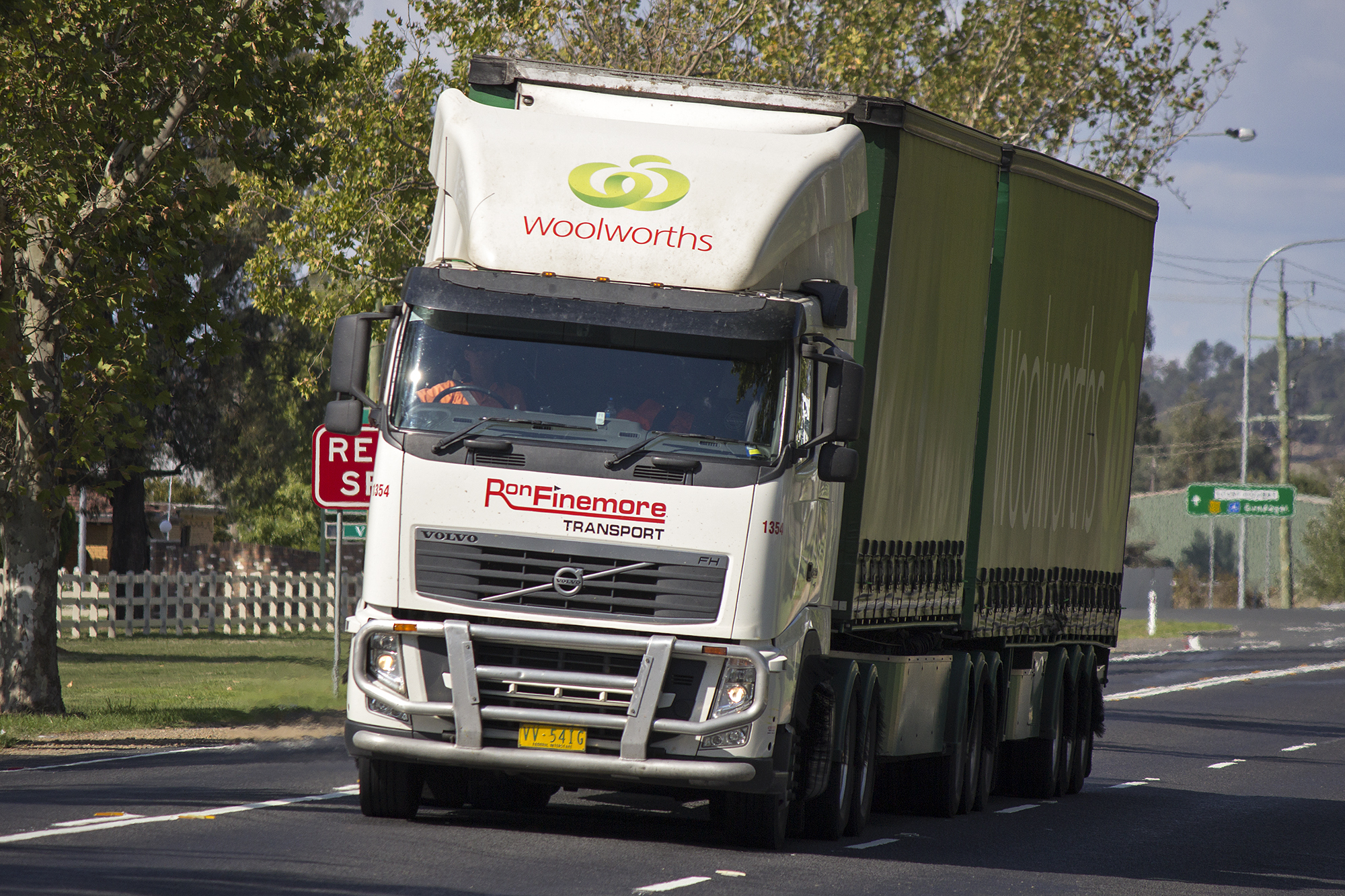
Ron Finemore Transport Volvo FH12 in Wagga Wagga in April 2013

In 1949 Jack Lewington founded Lewington's Transport with a single Leyland Comet 75 carting stock feed, phosphate and fuel. Lewington's were the largest livestock carrying business in Australia. Headquartered in Wodonga, depots were operated in Casino, Cootamundra and Goulburn.

In 2004 the company experienced financial difficulties due to a severe drought and was placed in voluntary administration with KordaMentha appointed administrator. The business was sold and rebranded as Ron Finemore Transport (RFT). Lewington’s had a fleet of around 140 trucks and operated in the livestock, fuel, bulk and general freight sectors. Finemore Holdings founder Ron Finemore and CVC Group each held 50% in RFT.

In 2005, the livestock business was sold to StockTrans. RFT was awarded a contract by Woolworths to move goods between its Melbourne and Sydney distribution centres. Smith's Transport of Orange was purchased in 2005 adding a second Woolworths distribution contract for its Central West of New South Wales stores and for the Manildra Group. Additional contracts with Woolworths were won in Barnawartha and the Riverina. In June 2014, CVC Group sold its 50% shareholding to Ron Finemore.

Regional hubs are located in Eagle Farm and Wagga Wagga.
