= Coopers Brewery =

Australian brewery

Coordinates: 34.8726°S 138.5731°E

Coopers Brewery Limited
- Type: Unlisted public
- Industry: Alcoholic beverage
- Founded: 1862; 164 years ago
- Founder: Thomas Cooper
- Headquarters: Adelaide, South Australia
- Products: Beer, homebrew
- Owner: The Cooper Family
- Website: www.coopers.com.au

Coopers Pale Ale

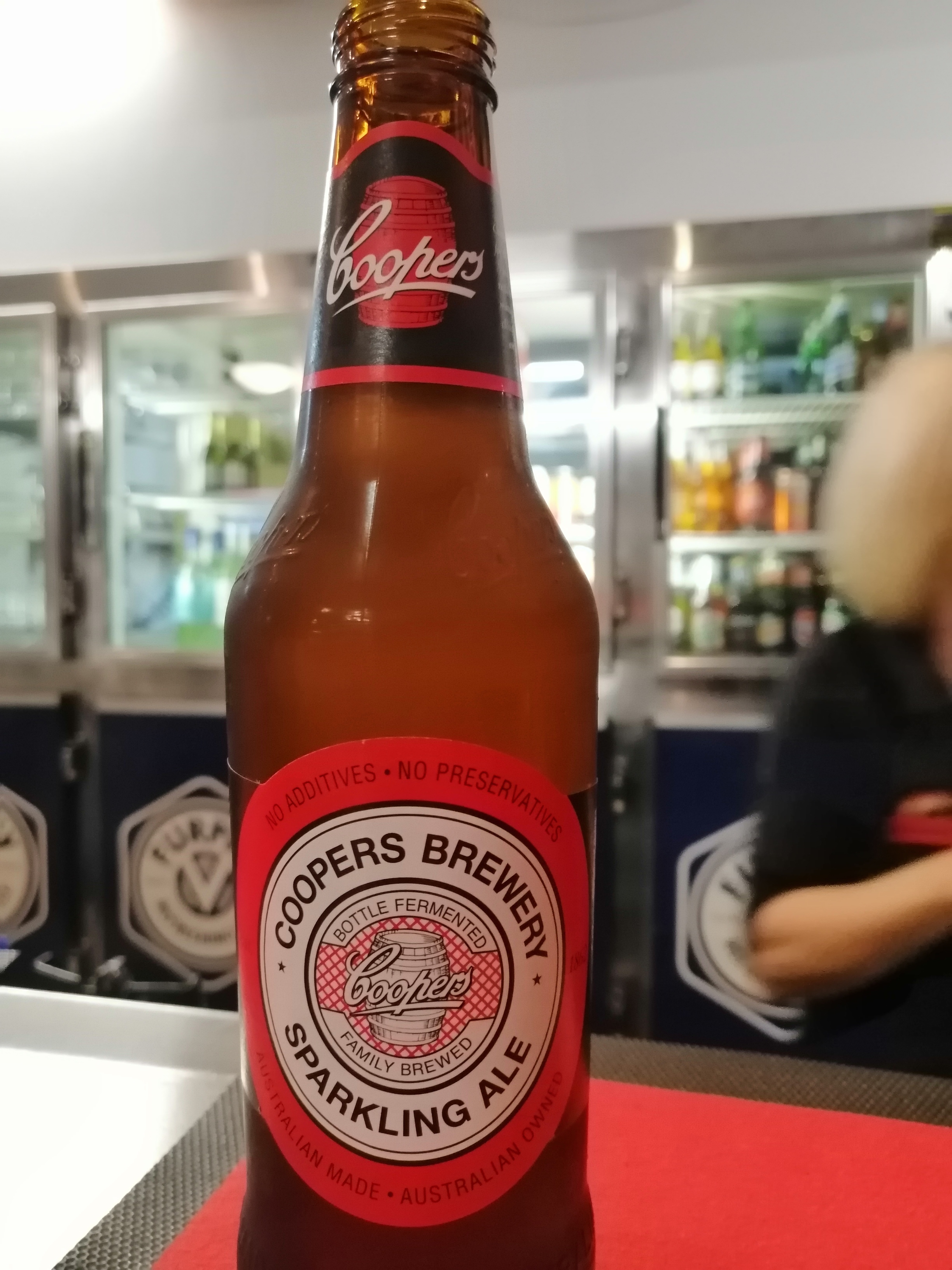
Coopers Sparkling Ale bottle (stubbie) 5.8% ABV

Coopers Brewery Limited, known simply as Coopers, is an Australian brewery based in the Adelaide suburb of Regency Park. Established by Thomas Cooper in 1862 and still owned by the Cooper Family, it is the largest Australian-owned brewery. Coopers is known for making a variety of beers, primarily their pale and sparkling ales, as well as being the world's largest producer of canned beer concentrate, used in homebrewing. Originally based in the eastern-suburb of Norwood, the brewery moved to nearby Leabrook in 1881, where it remained until its relocation to Regency Park in 2001.

== History ==
=== 19th century ===
The brewery was established by Thomas Cooper in 1862 at his home in the Adelaide suburb of Norwood. He brewed his first recorded batch on 13 May 1862.

In 1881 the brewery relocated to larger, commercial facilities at Leabrook.

Thomas died in 1897. In his will, after bequests to his wife, daughters and youngest sons, he left all his property to his four eldest surviving sons, John, Christopher, Samuel and Stanley, under instructions to "carry on my business as Brewers under the form of 'Thomas Cooper & Sons' as partners".

=== 20th century ===
Each time one of the partners retired or died, a new partnership agreement needed to be drawn up. This became unwieldy, so in 1923, the partners decided to incorporate with limited liability. An agreement was drawn up where the capital of the company was declared as £39,000, and 39,000 £1 shares were distributed. 15,953 of the shares were designated as class "A", and 15,953 as class "B". Directors were to be appointed equally by holders of "A" and "B" shares.

The company went through the doldrums during the recession of the late 1880s, a boom time in the 1920s, the doldrums during the Great Depression, and mixed fortunes through World War II and the 1950s. By the 1960s, the brewery was still producing much the same products as in the 1880s, but the brewing environment, and consumer demand, had changed.

==== 1962: South Australian Brewery share swap ====
There had been much consolidation of breweries in South Australia since Coopers was established, and the South Australian Brewing Company and Coopers & Sons were the only breweries remaining in Adelaide. As both were attractive takeover targets, in 1962 (after 100 years of Cooper family sole ownership), the two companies decided to do a mutually beneficial share swap in order to reduce the risk of takeover. The traditional South Australian market leader had been the South Australian Brewing Company. The share swap gave SA Brewing a 25% interest in Coopers ("C" and "D" class shares), and Coopers received 291,404 SA Brewing shares (2.65%). The Coopers board of directors was increased from four to five, with SA Brewing's "D" shares having the right to elect the fifth director. After consulting the SA Brewing board and receiving their support, Coopers sold their SA Brewing shares in 1984, (at a substantial profit). SA Brewing continued to hold their 25% interest in Coopers.

In the early 1960s, demand for Coopers Ales was flat, had been for years in the past, and looked like it would be for years into the future. The company strongly considered adding a Lager to their range. The older members of the board were highly resistant to such change, and, as this would be in competition with SA Brewing, the new board member was also resistant. It was not until 1967 that the board voted to go ahead with the new plant, with the SA Brewing representative not voting. After 105 years of only brewing ale and stout, "Gold Crown", Coopers first Lager, was available for sale in 1968.

In 1970, the retail price of a bottle of Coopers ale was 41 cents:

- 11.82 cents (28.8%) was brewery costs
- 19.55 cents (47.7%) was excise and taxes
- 8.75 cents (21.34%) went to the retailer
- 0.88 cents (2.16%) was the brewery profit.

==== 1987: 125th anniversary ====
To celebrate the 125th anniversary, the board commissioned Adelaide historian Alison Painter, (wife of John Painter, an engineer employed by Coopers in 1968 to oversee the upgrading of the brewery plant and the reduction in plant maintenance costs), to write "Jolly Good Ale and Old : The history of the Coopers Brewery 1862–1987".

==== 1993–1995: Lion Nathan takeover of SA Brewing ====
SA Brewing Holdings subsequently diversified into manufacturing and wine, and then refocused to form Southcorp, Southcorp Wines, and SA Brewing. SA Brewing was acquired by trans-Tasman Lion Nathan in 1993. After two years of negotiations, in 1995 family members purchased all of the "D" class shares (with their right to elect a director), and some of the "C" class shares, and Coopers Brewery Ltd purchased the remainder of the "C" class shares.

Thus, SA Brewing had a seat on the Cooper's board of directors from 1962 to 1995, but in 1995 the Cooper family once again became sole owners of the company.

=== 21st century ===
==== 2001: Regency Park ====
Coopers Brewery
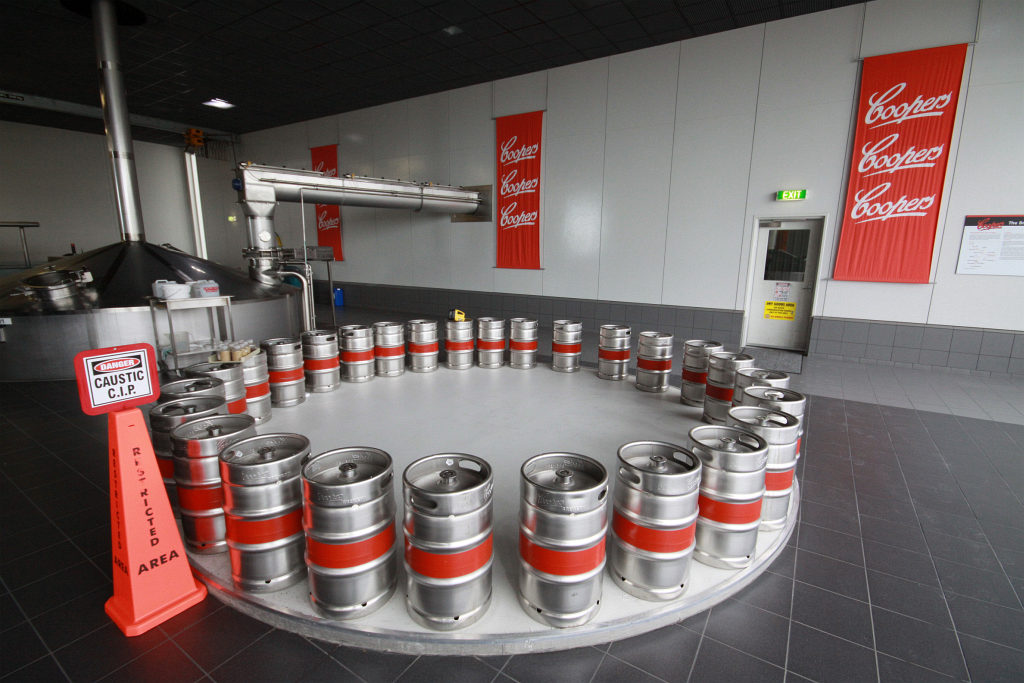
- Country: Australia
- Location: Regency Park, South Australia
- Status: Operational
- Commission date: March 2003
- Construction cost: A$7 million (2003)
- Owner: Coopers Brewery
- Operator: AGL Energy

Thermal power station
- Primary fuel: Natural gas
- Turbine technology: gas turbine
- Cogeneration?: Yes

Power generation
- Make and model: Solar Centaur 50S
- Nameplate capacity: 4.4 MW

External links
- Website: www.coopers.com.au
- Commons: Related media on Commons

In 2001, the brewery relocated to much larger premises at Regency Park.

Since 2003, the Regency Park brewery has used a gas turbine based cogeneration plant to supply steam and electric power requirements. Fired with natural gas with a thermal efficiency of 80%, the $6.2 million plant produces power with a 90% reduction in greenhouse gas emissions compared to a separate electricity generation and steam production plant. The plant is operated by AGL Energy and is rated at 4.4 MW. Generation above the brewery's electrical load of 1.2 MW is fed back into the grid.

==== 2005: Lion Nathan takeover bid ====
In late 2005, Lion Nathan made an unsolicited takeover bid for Coopers, which was strongly opposed by the board and by the Cooper family. It was ultimately rejected at an Extraordinary General Meeting when the holders of 93.4% of the shares voted in favour of permanently removing the 3rd tier purchasing rights of Lion Nathan, effectively preventing any current or future takeover bid.

Prince Alfred College held 70,000 shares (5%) in Coopers Brewery, which had been received in a bequest. At the time of the unsolicited takeover bid by Lion Nathan, these shares were valued at between $18 million and $22 million and considered to be a possible blocking stake.

With Lion Nathan wholly owned by Kirin Brewing Company since 2009, and Fosters owned by SABMiller since 2011, Coopers is the only wholly Australian-owned major brewery, and the largest.

Coopers released a limited-edition "Celebration Ale" to celebrate the 150th anniversary, as well as celebratory labels on their other beers.

==== 2017: Bible Society / same-sex marriage issue ====
On 9 March 2017 Coopers Brewery launched a limited edition premium beer (in both can and carton) to commemorate the bicentenary of the Bible Society. Public outcry arose over the use of the Coopers Brewery branded beer in a video of the Bible Society debate over the issue of same-sex marriage. Coopers Brewery issued two statements on 12 March 2017 in response to the backlash and also posted a tweet saying they were not trying to push a religious message. Various venues in Melbourne and Sydney subsequently announced they would no longer be stocking Coopers beers. On 14 March Coopers issued a further statement declaring they were cancelling the release of the Bible Society commemorative cans and joining Australian Marriage Equality.

==== 2022–2024: new visitor centre ====
In 2021, Coopers announced an expansion of its warehousing facilities at Regency Park. In April 2022, it announced a major expansion of the Regency Park site, creating a visitor centre, microbrewery, whisky distillery, and outdoor dining area. The estimated cost of the upgrade was A$50 million, but it grew to A$70 million, and took longer than expected to reach completion. The new visitors' centre, designed by Studio Nine Architects, opened on 28 August 2024, but the first whisky will not be ready for sale before 2028.

== Beers ==
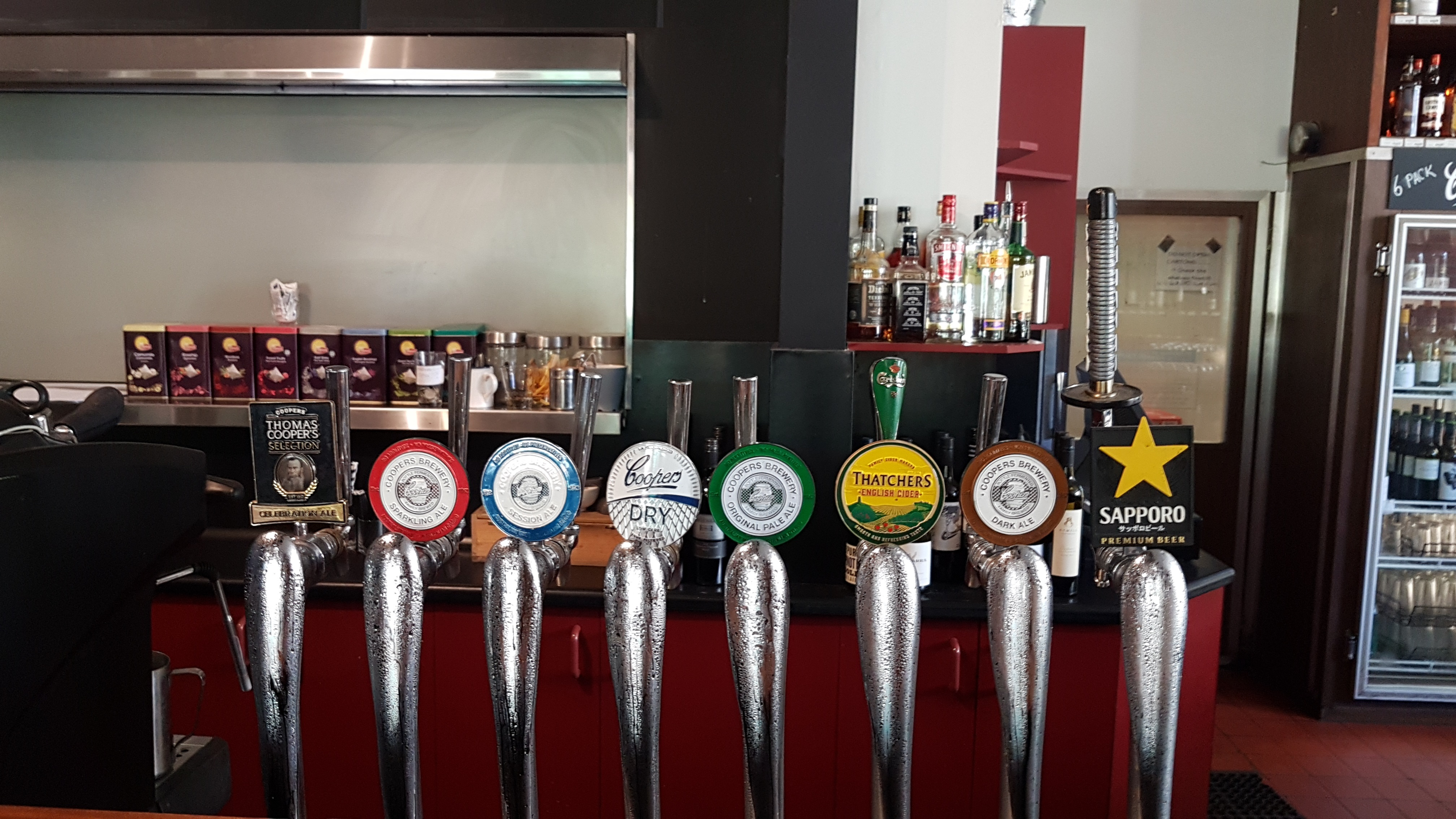
Beers at the Earl

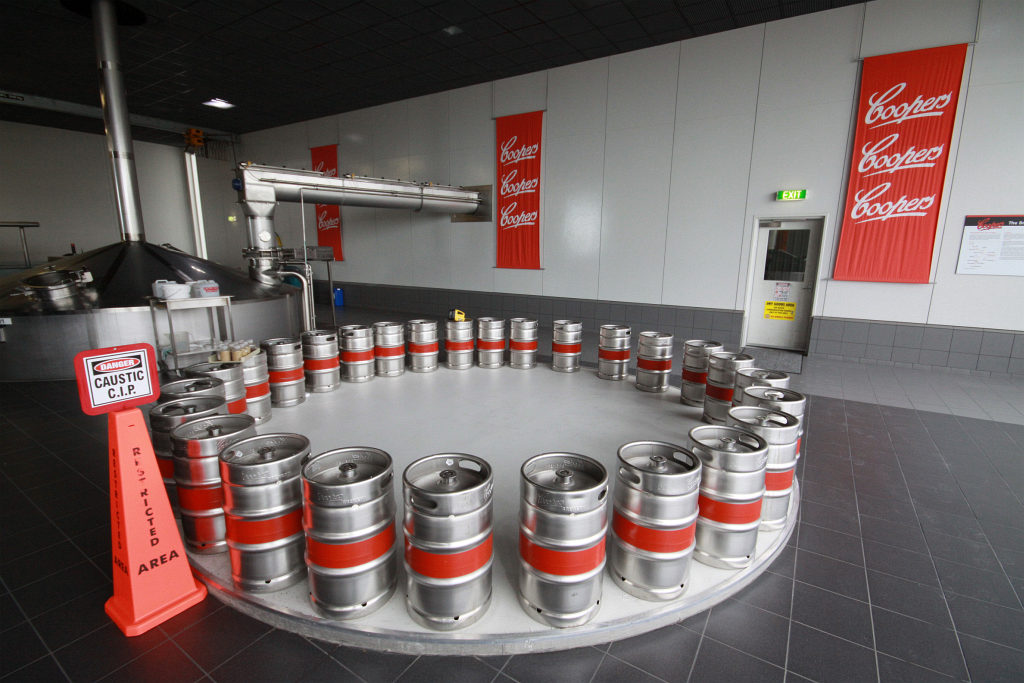
Part of Regency Pk brewery

Coopers beers are widely available on tap in South Australia, Victoria and New South Wales, and in some bars in the rest of Australia as speciality beers. They are widely available in bottles and (to a lesser extent) cans around Australia and New Zealand, and occasionally at specialist importers in other countries. The distribution of the beers outside of South Australia has been largely promoted since 2003 by the subsidiary Premium Beverages Pty Ltd.

Coopers bottled beers are characterised by their secondary fermentation technique – some yeast remains in the bottle after bottling – thus the bottled beer contains some sediment. There are three schools of thought with regard to the sediment – some drinkers like to mix the sediment throughout the beer by tipping or rolling the beer before drinking, while others prefer to decant the beer into a glass leaving (most of) the sediment at the base of the bottle. Coopers have made such choice a strong element in their marketing strategy. Some find that mixing the sediment results in a shaken beer and prefer not to mix the sediment at all, simply opening the bottle and drinking. The action of drinking from the bottle serves to distribute the sediment anyway without shaking one's beer up.

Coopers also produce a large range of homebrew kits. Among these are, English Bitter, Dark Ale, Real Ale and Lager, as well as several others.

Current Coopers Beers
| Beer | ABV | Available | | | Label colour | Details |
|---|---|---|---|---|---|---|
| Beer | ABV | Tap | Bottle | Can | Label colour | Details |
| Australian lager | 4.2% | Y | Y | Y | Turquoise | An Australian lager. |
| Sparkling Ale | 5.8% | Y | Y | Y | Red | An English style golden ale. It has a distinctive cloudy appearance due to the sediment being left in the bottle. The Sparkling Ale has a slightly different flavour and higher alcoholic content than the Pale Ale. |
| Pale Ale | 4.5% | Y | Y | Y | Green | A pale ale. |
| Best Extra Stout | 6.3% | Y | Y | – | Yellow | A stout. |
| Dark Ale | 4.5% | Y | Y | – | Brown | A dark ale, which in other parts of the world is called a brown ale. |
| Mild Ale | 3.5% | Y | Y | Y | Orange | A Midstrength Ale. Coopers entry into the lager dominated mid-strength market. |
| Premium Light | 2.9% | Y | Y | Y | Blue | A low-alcohol beer by Australian standards. In Australia, any beer with less than 3% alcohol is called "light". |
| Pacific Pale Ale | 4.2% | Y | Y | Y | Blue | A blonde ale, labelled as Session Ale until 2020. |
| Extra Pale Ale (XPA) | 5.2% | Y | – | Y | Purple | A more crispier, fruiter flavoured Pale Ale. |
| Hazy IPA | 6.2% | Y | – | Y | Pink | Limited edition, seasonal IPA. |
| Ultra Light Birell | 0.5% | – | Y | Y | White | A non-alcoholic lager style beer. |
| Dry | 4.2% | – | Y | Y | White | A low-carb, fine filtered lager style beer. |

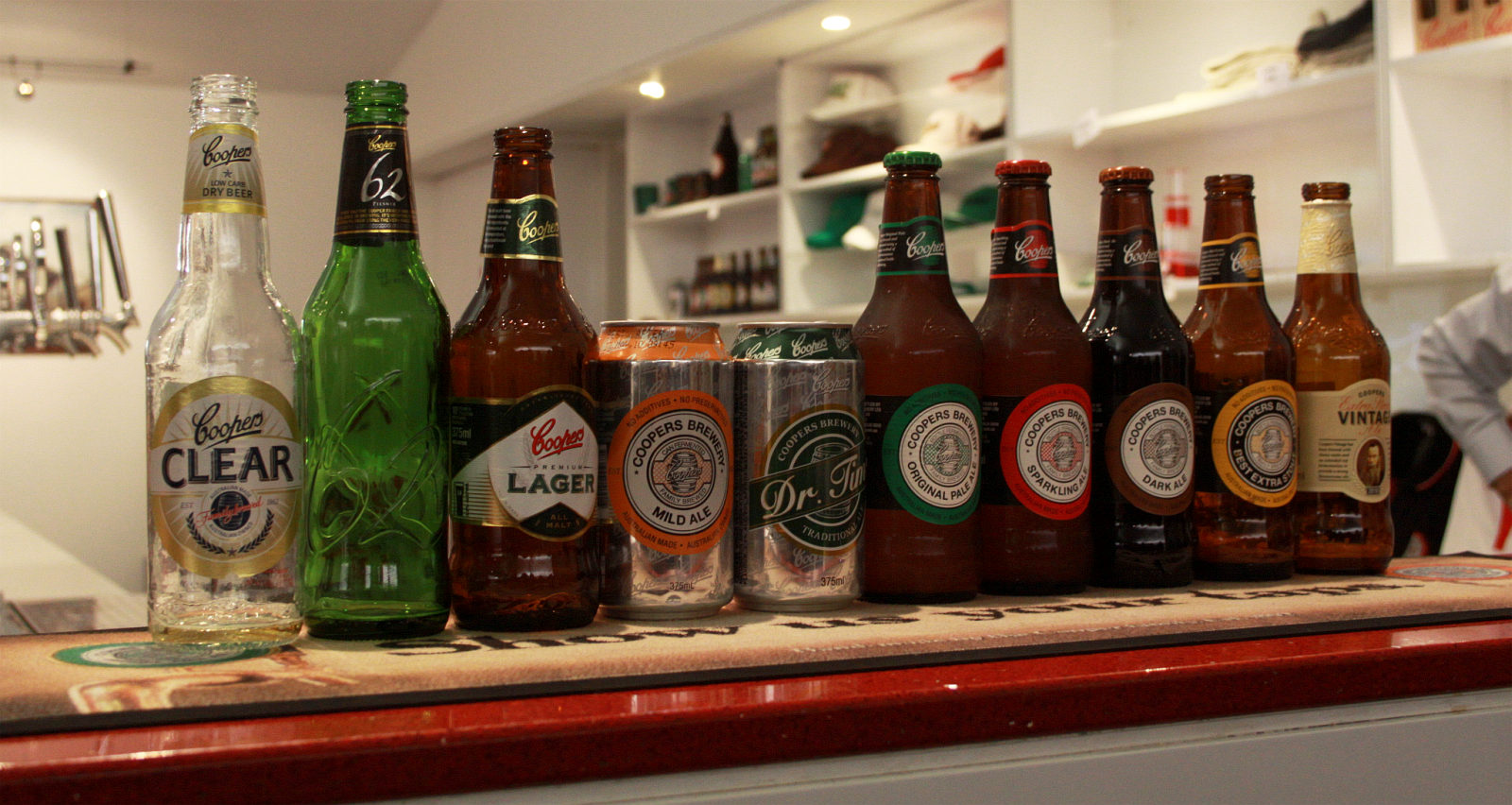
Part of the Coopers range of beers: Clear, 62 Pilsner, Premium Lager, Mild Ale, Dr. Tim's Traditional Ale, Pale Ale, Sparkling Ale, Dark Ale, Best Extra Stout, Extra Strong Vintage Ale.

Previous Coopers Beers (discontinued, renamed, seasonal, limited edition, replaced)
| Beer | ABV | Available | | Label Colour | Details |
|---|---|---|---|---|---|
| Beer | ABV | From | To | Label Colour | Details |
| Light Dinner Ale | – | – | – | Light Green | A precursor of Pale Ale. |
| Light Brew Sparkling Ale | - | – | – | Light Brown | A precursor of Pale Ale. |
| Scotch Ale | - | – | – | – | . |
| Broken Hill Real Ale | - | – | – | – | A bitter. |
| Family Secrets Amber Ale | 5.2% | – | – | – | A limited seasonal release red ale. |
| Brew-A | 6.0% | – | – | – | A limited seasonal release IPA. |
| Vintage Ale | 7.5% | 2019 | 2020 | – | A limited seasonal release traditional Ale. Each release is year named |
| LC Light Ale | - | – | – | – | . |
| Special Old Stout | 6.8% | – | – | – | . |
| Heritage | 5.2% | – | – | – | . |
| Adelaide Bitter | - | – | – | – | . |
| Adelaide Lager | - | – | – | – | . |
| Black Crow | 3.6% | – | – | – | A mild ale. |
| Clear Ale | - | – | – | – | . |
| Premium Ale | 4.9% | – | – | – | . |
| Thomas Coopers Finest Export Ale | 4.9% | – | – | – | . |
| DB | 4.4% | – | – | – | For Diet Beer; a carbohydrate-modified beer. |
| Regency Light | 2.9% | – | – | – | . |
| Regency Draught | 4.9% | – | – | – | . |
| Big Barrel Lager | - | – | – | – | . |
| Gold Crown Lager | - | – | – | – | . |
| Premium Lager | 4.8% | Y | Y | Green | A lager. |
| 62 Pilsner | 5.0% | Y | Y | Black | A pilsner. |
| Clear | 4.5% | Y | Y | Gold | A full strength low carbohydrate dry beer. |
| Extra Strong Vintage Ale | 7.5% | Y | Y | Cream | An English strong ale, also known as real ale. Seasonal limited edition. |
| Dr. Tim's Traditional Ale | 4.5% | – | – | Green | A pale ale naturally conditioned in an Aluminium Can. This was essentially Pale Ale rebranded to overcome any comments about differences in taste due to the can. Eventually the product was named consistently with bottle and keg Pale Ale. |

The company also produces a range of malt extracts and concentrate for homebrewers.

=== Pale Ale ===
In the twenty-first century Pale Ale is Coopers' most heavily marketed, most recognised, and most successful beer. Although it has only been produced under this name since 1989, it did have a number of similar predecessors from which it can claim a pedigree, with names including "Light Brew Sparkling Ale" (brewed in the late nineteenth century and early twentieth century before being discontinued due to poor sales), and "Light Dinner Ale" (brewed from the 1960s with some changes to the recipe). The beer occupies a unique place in the local market – it is seen as being somewhere between a 'craft beer' and the traditional mass-produced lagers.

=== Distribution ===
Coopers distributes Carlsberg, Kronenbourg, Mythos, and Sapporo in Australia.

In 2022, it was announced that Coopers had been awarded the brewing rights to Miller Genuine Draft in Australia, which includes Miller Chill (Lime, and Blood Orange flavours). Distribution rights for the Miller range were awarded to Perth-based Good Drinks Australia. In addition the partnership secured the licensed brewing rights to Coors Light.

== The Cooper family ==
As of 2009, six generations of the family had been involved in the brewery.

=== Thomas Cooper ===
Thomas Cooper (1826–1897) was born in Carleton, North Yorkshire, and is the originator of the Adelaide Cooper family. Thomas married twice, leading to two branches of the family, known as the "A side" and "B side" of the family. This has led to the company having multiple classes of shares with different voting rights.

In 1849 he married Ann Laycock Brown (1827–1872) in the Wesleyan Chapel in Skipton, and they had three living children when they arrived in Port Adelaide on 24 August 1852. Their first home was a rented two-room cottage near the Rising Sun Inn on Bridge Street in the then village of Kensington, about three miles east of the city. Thomas worked initially as a shoemaker, then as a mason, and then as a dairyman, and Ann bore four more children. In 1856 he purchased land and built a house in George Street, Norwood.

On 13 May 1862, Thomas brewed his first recorded batch. He did all the work himself (purchasing, calling for orders, brewing, washing, filling, corking and wiring the bottles, delivering the finished product), while continuing to attend the cows, run the dairy, and do the daily milk deliveries. He mortgaged his property to Frederick Scarfe, the Mayor of Norwood, a butcher, for £300, and built a new brewhouse. In January 1863 he sold his cows and the milk delivery run. Although with half-a-dozen breweries in Adelaide, there was a lot of competition, Thomas's ale was unique in that he used no sugar, "consequently, ours being pure, the doctors recommend it to their patients". Although one of the smaller South Australian brewers, Thomas gained a reputation for quality. By 1867 he had over 120 customers, some quite notable (such as Samuel Davenport, John Barton Hack, George Hawker, and Dr Penfold), but he did not supply public houses, "apparently because it was against his principles".

Ann bore four more children before dying suddenly in 1872. She was survived by all five of her sons, and two of her six daughters. Thomas remarried in 1874, and Sarah Louisa Perry bore eight children. When he died in 1897, Thomas was survived by his wife, and nine of his nineteen children – seven of his sons, and two of his daughters.

=== Tim Cooper ===
Dr Tim Cooper AM, who entered the family business in 1990 after training as a medical doctor and working as a cardiologist in the UK for some years, became managing director and chief brewer, taking over from his father Bill.

In 2004 the company introduced a traditional pale ale in an aluminum can, Dr Tim's Traditional Ale, based on an experiment by him, and it proved very popular.

In January 2025 it was announced that Tim Cooper would be stepping down as managing director on 1 March. General manager Michael Shearer, who has been with the company since 2004, would be assuming the role of managing director. The company continues to be family-owned and run, with the majority of the board being members of the Cooper family. Tim remains a director and chief brewer.

=== Glenn Cooper ===
Glenn Cooper AM, is a fifth-generation family member. He entered the business in 1990, having previously worked in IT and marketing roles for both Anderson Digital Equipment and his own Adelaide-based business. He retired from his executive position at the company in 2014, but remained chair until December 2023.

=== Melanie Cooper ===
Melanie Cooper AM, an accountant, was appointed chair of Coopers Brewery in December 2023, taking over from Glenn. Mel is the first female chair of the company, and is also director of Corporate Affairs and chair of the Coopers Brewery Foundation.

== Company structure ==
=== Cooper & Sons – 1862-1897 ===
Thomas started recording his brews in 1862, and by the late 1860s he was employing one man, and his teenage son William. After initial success and expansion, in the late 1860s Thomas had many problems with the quality of the brews, and the business did not fare well for the next decade. In 1870 he sold all his property to meet his debts, and moved to rented premises in High Street, Kensington. By 1877, Thomas had resolved many of the quality problems, and in 1878 sales were back up to the level of the good years of the 1860s. In 1878, second son John went to work in the brewery full-time.

Although Thomas continued to refuse to sell to public houses, and the licensing laws required his minimum sale to be five gallons, his customer base continued to expand, and on 23 July 1881, the first ale was brewed at the much larger newly purchased and built premises in Statenborough Street, Leabrook. Although eldest son William died in 1882 (aged 32), by this time second and third sons Thomas and Christopher were working in the brewery, and fourth son Joseph joined them when he finished his schooling. Under John's influence and monitoring, there was greater uniformity of the materials used, and the quality of the products steadily improved. In 1882, production increased to 30,000 gallons, and in the mid-1880s, 48,000 gallons, with the brewery employing seven men. The South Australian economic depression of the 1880s and 1890s suppressed demand, and for the next 10 years, production was level at around 30,000 gallons per year. Thomas retired from general work in the early 1890s, with John running the business with Christopher. Joseph died in 1888 (aged 25). Fifth son Samuel and sixth son Stanley (the eldest of second wife Sarah's children) came to the brewery when they finished school, as did William's son, Will, and younger sons Frederic, Charles and Walter.

=== Thos Cooper & Sons – Partnership – 1897–1923 ===
Thomas died on 30 December 1897. After bequests to his wife, daughters and youngest sons, his will left all of his property to his four eldest surviving sons, (John, Christopher, Samuel and Stanley), under instructions to "carry on my business as Brewers under the form of 'Thos Cooper & Sons' as partners". Younger sons Frederic, (who spent all of his working life at the brewery), and Charles, (who worked at the brewery for many years), received no interest in the business. Nor did grandson Will, who also worked at the brewery. Youngest son Walter was bequeathed an interest in the business when he reached age 25, but died of malaria aged 26.

=== Cooper & Sons Ltd – 1923–1988 ===
Each time one of the partners retired or died, a new partnership agreement needed to be drawn up. This became unwieldy, so in 1923, the partners decided to incorporate with limited liability. An agreement was drawn up where the capital of the company was declared as £39,000, and the 39,000 £1 shares were distributed:

| John Thomas Cooper | 15,953 shares | 41% | "A" |
| Executors of Samuel's widow's estate (on direction of J.T. Cooper) | 7,092 shares | 18% | "C" |
| Stanley Reasey Cooper | 15,953 shares | 41% | "B" |
| Francis Thomas Cooper | 1 share | | "C" |
| Wilfred Frank Cooper | 1 share | | "C" |

Directors were to be appointed equally by holders of "A" and "B" shares.

In 1962, when the two remaining Adelaide brewers were fearing takeover, SA Brewing and Coopers did a share swap. This gave SA Brewing a 25% interest in Coopers ("C" and "D" class shares) and Coopers received 291,404 SA Brewing shares (2.65%). The Coopers board of directors was increased from four to five, with SA Brewing's "D" shares having the right to elect the fifth director. At the time, a total of 486,750 new shares were issued, being made up of 87,751 "D" class shares and the remainder, along with other unclassified shares, becoming "C" class shares.

After discussions with, and receiving support from, SA Brewing, Coopers sold their SA Brewing shares in 1984, at a substantial profit.

==== Directors ====
The directors of Cooper & Sons Ltd were:

| | Chairman | Family board members | Other board members | seats | Managing director |
|---|---|---|---|---|---|
| 1923 | J.T. Cooper (A) | S.R. Cooper (B) | | 2 | |
| 1935 | S.R. Cooper (B) | F.T. Cooper (A); T.E. Cooper (B); A.A. Cooper (A) | | 4 | |
| 1938 | F.T. Cooper (A) | T.E. Cooper (B); A.A. Cooper (A); R.S. Cooper (B) | | 4 | |
| 1944 | T.E. Cooper (B) | A.A. Cooper (A); R.S. Cooper (B); vacant (A) | | 4 | |
| 1945 | T.E. Cooper (B) | A.A. Cooper (A); R.S. Cooper (B); G.D.T. Cooper (A) | | 4 | |
| 1959 | T.E. Cooper (B) | R.S. Cooper (B); G.D.T. Cooper (A); K.A. Cooper (A) | (Fifth seat created 1962) | 4 | |
| 1962 | T.E. Cooper (B) | R.S. Cooper (B); G.D.T. Cooper (A); K.A. Cooper (A) | Sir Roland Jacobs (SA Brewing) (D) | 5 | |
| 1967 | T.E. Cooper (B) | R.S. Cooper (B); G.D.T. Cooper (A); K.A. Cooper (A) | Sir Norman Young (SA Brewing) (D) | 5 | |
| 1969 | Geoff Cooper (A) | Ken Cooper (A); Max Cooper (B); Bill Cooper (B) | Sir Norman Young (SA Brewing) (D) | 5 | Geoff Cooper |
| 1977 | Geoff Cooper (A) | Ken Cooper (A); Max Cooper (B); Bill Cooper (B) | Sir Norman Young (SA Brewing) (D) | 5 | Bill Cooper |
| 1983 | Geoff Cooper (A) | Ken Cooper (A); Max Cooper (B); Bill Cooper (B) | J.I.N. Winter (SA Brewing) (D) | 5 | Bill Cooper |

=== Coopers Brewery Ltd – since 1988 ===
With Melanie joining the company in 1985, (and subsequently becoming Company Secretary, and a Director), the name "Cooper & Sons" was no longer appropriate. She lobbied for a change in the company's name, and was eventually successful.

SA Brewing was acquired by trans-Tasman Lion Nathan in 1993. After two years of negotiations, in 1995 Cooper family members purchased all of the "D" class shares (with their right to elect a director), and some of the "C" class shares, and Coopers Brewery Ltd purchased the remainder of the "C" class shares held by SA Brewing. In return the Coopers constitution was amended to give Lion Nathan "third tier" rights to buy Coopers shares.

This resulted in Max and Bill owning more than 50% of the "D" class shares. They agreed that Bill would sell Max his "D" class shares, and Max would sell Bill his "B" class shares, resulting in Max owning the majority of the "D"s, and Bill owning the majority of the "B"s.

In 2005, Lion Nathan launched a hostile takeover of Coopers, offering to buy Coopers shares at five times the price at which they had last traded. Although the 1995 negotiations resulted in Lion Nathan owning no Coopers shares, the section of the Coopers constitution, (which stated the circumstances under which shares could be sold), appeared to give Lion Nathan the avenue to buy Coopers shares. The constitution stated three tiers of purchasing rights:

The shares must first be offered to an existing shareholder. ("first rights agreement");
If existing shareholders choose not to buy, the shares must then be offered to the Coopers Superannuation Fund. ("second rights agreement");
If the Fund chooses not to buy, the shares must then be offered to Lion Nathan. ("third rights agreement")

Lots of legal activity, injunctions, claims and counter-claims followed. Eventually the Coopers Board gained a ruling that allowed them to call an Extraordinary General Meeting to decide a motion which would remove the "third rights agreement" from the constitution. At the meeting, the holders of 93.4% of the shares voted to remove the "third rights agreement" from the constitution.

At the time (November 2005), Coopers had 117 Shareholders, and 4 classes of shares. The Coopers Constitution and the 2005 Buy-Back Offer stated:

(a) the holders of (the 15,553) A Class shares may elect two directors to the board of Coopers (A Class directors);
(b) the holders of (the 15,953) B Class shares may elect two directors to the board of Coopers (B Class directors);
(c) the holders of (the 1,234,761) C Class shares, with the holders of Classes A, B and D Class shares, may elect one director to the board of Coopers if that director is nominated by a unanimous resolution of all directors appointed by the holders of A, B and D shares (C Class director); and
(d) the holders of (the 87,091) D Class shares may elect one director to the board of Coopers (D Class director).

The total number of shares, of all classes, was 1,353,358. If the Buy-Back was fully subscribed, 203,003 shares would be cancelled, and the total number of shares would be reduced to 1,150,335.

The Takeovers Panel stated that the directors' holdings were:

- Glenn and James (or interests closely associated with them) controlled 4,834 A Class shares or approximately 31% of the A Class shares
- Bill, (or interests closely associated with him), controlled 9,456 B Class shares or approximately 59% of the B Class shares.
- M. Cooper Nominees Pty. Ltd., a company associated with Max, controlled 49,271 D Class shares or approximately 57% of the D Class shares.
- The other Coopers directors (or persons closely associated with them) owned 10,420 or approximately 11.7% of the D Class shares.
- The Coopers directors' voting power was 28.2%.

In the chairman's address to the 2006 AGM, Glenn noted that the costs incurred by Coopers in addressing the offer were $8 million.

In 2009, Coopers Brewery Ltd appointed its first female director.

==== Directors ====
The directors of Coopers Brewery Ltd have been:

| | Chairman | Family Board members | | | Other board members | Seats | Managing Director |
| | Chairman | A | B | | D | Seats | Managing Director |
|---|---|---|---|---|---|---|---|
| 1988 | Geoff (A) | *Glenn | *Max & *Bill | | J.I.N. Winter (SA Brewing) (D) | 5 | Bill |
| 1990 | *Max (B) | *Glenn & James | *Bill | | J.I.N. Winter (SA Brewing) (D) | 5 | Bill |
| 1995 | *Max (D) | *Glenn & James | *Bill & N.C. Shierlaw | (1995: Fifth seat in family control) | C | 5 | Bill |
| 1996 | *Max (D) | *Glenn & James | *Bill & N.C. Shierlaw | (1995: Fifth seat in family control) | (Sixth seat 1996–2006); D.R. Kingston (Rothschild) (C) | 6 | Bill |
| 1997 | *Max (D) | *Glenn & James | *Bill & *Tim | D | (Sixth seat 1996–2006); D.R. Kingston (Rothschild) (C) | 6 | Bill |
| 2002 | *Glenn (A) | James | Bill & *Tim | Cameron Pearce | (Sixth seat 1996–2006); D.R. Kingston (Rothschild) (C) | 6 | Tim |
| 2007 | *Glenn (A) | James | Bill & *Tim | Cameron Pearce | (No external directors) | 5 | Tim |
| 2009 | *Glenn (A) | James | *Tim & *Melanie | Cameron Pearce | (No external directors) | 5 | Tim |
| 2010 | *Glenn (A) | James | *Tim & *Melanie | *Cam Pearce | (No external directors) | 5 | Tim |
| now | *Glenn (A) | James | *Tim & *Melanie | *Cam Pearce | (No external directors) | 5 | Tim |
| | * = executive chairman/director | | | | | | |

== See also ==
- Australian pub
- Beer in Australia
- List of breweries in Australia
- South Australian food and drink
