= Ines Scotland =

Australian businesswoman

Inés Scotland is an Australian businesswoman. She is considered to be the most successful self-made female mining executives.

Scotland is the Chair of ASX listed minerals project development company Metal Bank (ASX:MBK). She was appointed as chair on 13 August 2013.

Her previous role was as the CEO of ASX listed company Citadel Resource Group, Limited. Citadel had a portfolio of gold and base metals projects in Saudi Arabia, with its operations headquarters located in Jeddah. Citadel was one of only a handful of western mining companies operating in Saudi Arabia, and Scotland was in a unique position as the only one headed by a woman.

Scotland was included on the BRW Rich Executive List with a debut position at No.60 out of 300. She was one of only 5 women to be included in 2009.

In 2010 Citadel was taken over by Equinox Minerals, which was then taken over by Barrick Gold in 2011, Scotland has sat on a number of Company Boards and spent time as the CEO of Ivanhoe.
