= Peter Rowsthorn (actor) =

Australian comedian (born 1963)

- Born: 9 February 1963 (age 63); Melbourne, Australia
- Education: Trinity Grammar School; Rusden College
- Occupations: Comedian; actor; presenter; MC; host; theatre
- Years active: 1983–present
- Known for: Kath and Kim, Let the Blood Run Free
- Spouse: Gabrielle Rowsthorn
- Children: 4

Peter Rowsthorn (born 9 February 1963) is an Australian stand-up comedian, actor, writer, producer, MC, host and theatre.

== Early life and education ==
Rowsthorn attended Trinity Grammar School in Kew, before pursuing tertiary education at Rusden College (now part of Deakin University), where he obtained a teaching degree. He worked as a drama teacher, prior to his show business career. He grew up in the Melbourne suburb of Mount Waverley.

== Career ==
Rowsthorn started performing as half of the comedy and singing duo The Cactus Brothers in 1983 while studying for his degree.

He first came to prominence locally as a stand-up comic and as a writer and performer on the sketch comedy series The Comedy Company (1989). Rowsthorn appeared with Warren Mitchell in the film Crackers (1998), was a lead in the Australian children's television show The Gift (1997), had small roles in Bad Eggs and Take Away (both 2003) and played an outrageous hairdresser called 'Miss Kafka' in the Sigrid Thornton telemovie Little Oberon (2005).

Rowsthorn played Warren Cronkshonk in the comedy hospital spoof Let the Blood Run Free from 1990 to 1992.

== Kath and Kim and others ==
He is probably best known for his TV work, particularly as Brett Craig in the hit series Kath & Kim (2002–2007) and 2012 movie, Kath & Kimderella. In 2022, Rowsthorn reprised the character of Brett for the Kath and Kim special that aired on channel 7.

Rowsthorn was the host of factual show, Can We Help?, on ABC TV between 2006 and 2011.

Rowsthorn has also appeared on Thank God You're Here, Celebrity Name Game, Talkin' 'Bout Your Generation, Studio 10, Show Me the Movie! and Hughesy, We Have a Problem.

In 2018, Rowsthorn appeared on the fourth season of the Australian version of I'm a Celebrity...Get Me Out of Here!. On 7 March 2018, Rowsthorn was evicted after 40 days in the jungle, coming 6th place.

In 2023, Rowsthorn competed on the celebrity edition of The Amazing Race Australia with his daughter, Frankie. In December 2023, Rowsthorn played the character Amos in the theatrical production of Chicago.

== Personal life ==
Rowsthorn supports various charity and community groups including Oxfam.

Rowsthorn is a featured guest on SBS genealogy series Who Do You Think You Are?.

As of 2013, he resides in Perth, Western Australia.

His older brother is prominent Melbourne businessman Mark Rowsthorn. His father is Peter Rowsthorn Snr.

He is a keen follower of AFL club Hawthorn.

== Filmography ==
=== Film ===
Year	Title	Role	Notes
1989	Bonza	Terry	Short film
1998	Crackers	Bruno	
2003	Roy Hollsdotter Live	Comic	Television film
2003	Bad Eggs	Wacka	
2003	Take Away	Barry Burgie	
2005	Little Oberon	Miss Kafka	Television film
2005	Da Kath & Kim Code	Brett Craig	Television film
2011	The Applicant	Applicant	Short film
2012	Kath & Kimderella	Brett Craig	
2012	Exchange Student Zero	Denmead (voice)	Television film
2014	Paper Planes	Mr. Hickenlooper	
2014	Timothy	Colin Garrett	Television film
2014	Welcome to Dookie	Ray	Short film
2015	Looking for Grace	Steve	
2017	Crumbs	Courier	Short film
2017	Three Summers	Tony	
2020	I Met A Girl	Mr. Rocket	Television Film
2020	Cadet	Dad	Short film

=== Television ===
Year	Title	Role	Notes
1988–90	The Comedy Company	Newsplanet Frontman	
1990	Catalyst	Himself	
1990–93	Let the Blood Run Free	Warren Cronkshonk	26 episodes
1991	Tuesday Night Live: The Big Gig	Himself	
1994	Australia's Funniest People	Himself	1 episode
1995	Something Hot Before Bed	Himself	
1997	The Gift	Ralf	26 episodes
1998	Hessie's Shed	Himself	1 episode
1999	All Star Squares	Panelist	
1999	Law of the Land	Scott	1 episode
2000	Introducing Gary Petty	Dylan	1 episode
2000	Chuck Finn	Drake	1 episode
2001–05	Rove Live	Himself	2 episodes
2002–07	Kath & Kim	Brett Craig	32 episodes
2003	Show Us Your Roots	Himself	TV special
2004	All Saints	John Morton	1 episode
2005	Australia Unites: Reach Out to Asia	Himself	TV special
2005	Telethon	Himself	1 episode
2005–06	The Footy Show	Himself	3 episodes
2006	Bert's Family Feud	Himself	3 episodes
2006–07	Get This	Himself	Podcast Series, 9 episodes
2006–09	Thank God You're Here	Himself	7 episodes
2006–12	Can We Help?	Himself	
2006–16	20 to 1	Actor & Comedian	12 episodes
2007	The Nation	Himself	1 episode
2008	Spicks and Specks	Himself	1 episode
2009	Snake Tales	Jake Johnson	13 episodes
2009	Celebrity MasterChef Australia	Contestant	10 episodes
2009–19	Talkin' Bout Your Generation	Himself	4 episodes
2010	The Bounce	Himself	1 episode
2010–11	Statesmen of Comedy Himself	Himself	2 episodes
2011	The Jesters	Kenny Ford	1 episode
2011	Adam Hills in Gordon St Tonight	Himself	1 episode
2011	Between the Lines	Himself	
2011	Henry & Aaron's 7 Steps to Superstardom	Magnus	1 episode
2011	Mal.com	Franky	1 episode
2013	Underbelly	Eric Harrison	1 episode
2013	The Silic & Lee Show	Himself, Brett Craig	1 episode
2013	It's a Date	Michael	1 episode
2015	Open Slather	Special Guest	5 episodes
2015	Who Do You Think You Are?	Actor & comedian	1 episode
2018	I'm a Celebrity...Get Me Out of Here!	Contestant	31 episodes
2018	Hughesy, We Have a Problem	Himself	1 episode
2019	Show Me the Movie!	Himself	1 episode
2020	Funny in Failure	Himself	Podcast series
2022	Kath and Kim: Our Effluent Life	Brett Craig	2 episodes
2023	Would I Lie to You?	Himself	1 episode
2023	The Project	Himself	1 episode
2023	The Amazing Race Australia	Contestant	12 episodes
2024	Thrash 'n Treasure	Himself	1 episode
2025	Ghosts Australia	Richard Larkin	1 Episode
