= David Kingston =

Australian banker

David R Kingston (born in London, England) is a Sydney merchant banker. He is chairman of Brisbane tourism group Club Crocodile, owns the Palace Group of hotels, including The Roxy Hotel, The Elk Hotel and Beachcomber Hotel.

Kingston was formerly a Non-Executive Managing Director of N M Rothschild & Sons Australia. He is a director of Southern Cross Broadcasting, and a former independent director of Coopers Brewery.

According to the Crikey website in 2006, Kingston was estimated by colleagues to be worth about $150 million.
