= J. T. Picken =

Scottish-Australian businessman

James Thomson Picken Sr. was a Scottish-Australian businessman.

Picken was born in Glasgow, Scotland in 1856. He later emigrated to Australia and settled in Melbourne about 1875.

In 1896, he established the privately-owned publishers, J.T. Picken Ltd Printers, of which he was chairman. His sons, James Jr and J. Harvie Picken would join the family business.

The family also operated canning and packaging businesses. They amalgamated 5 companies into the one, Containers Ltd, which was incorporated in 1949. In 1952, the company went public. In 1981, it was taken over by Australian Paper Mills (APM), which would later become. Amcor Limited.

In 1923, Picken was president of the Royal Caledonian Society. Picken also had a large Robert Burns collection which he donated to Scotch College.

Picken died on 22 December 1925.

== Bibliography ==
- E.K. Sinclair, "The Spreading Tree, A history of APM and Amcor 1844-1989", Allen and Unwin, 1990
