= Cillín Perera =

Cillín Johann Perera
- Born: London
- Education: Harvard University
- Known for: Photography
- Notable work: Homeless CEO
- Website: instagram.com/homelessCEO/

Cillín Johann Perera is an Australian technologist, photographer and patron of the arts who is known for his "HomelessCEO" project. Between 2013 and 2017, Perera documented his travels by uploading a photo of every flight and each day on Instagram. The project encompassed more than 1000 images from dozens of countries and hundreds of flights and was the subject of a touring exhibition.

Perera is currently the chief executive officer (CEO) of Avilinga, founder of nthspace and a Fellow at the NYU Marron Institute. He is a collector and patron of Australian Aboriginal art.

== Early life ==
Perera was born in London to an Irish mother and a Sri Lankan father, and grew up in Melbourne, Australia.

In 1995, he went to the United States to study visual arts and cinema under scholarship at Harvard University. As a freshman, he started a non-profit company and a late-night show, Wide Awake with Cillin Perera. In 1997, Perera was assistant director of Joshua Oppenheimer's The Entire History of the Louisiana Purchase, an experimental documentary that won several festival awards.

== Photography ==
In July 2013, Perera started the "HomelessCEO" project, as a way to express the nomadic lifestyle of the modern CEO. Not spending more than four or five days in any one place, Perera took 168 flights and traveled more than 200,000 miles in 2014.

=== Technique ===
HomelessCEO was shot entirely on Apple iPod and iPhone. Perera's style puts a strong emphasis on composition and perspective, partly as a result of equipment limitations. For flights, Perera frequently shoots the view from the passenger window; the project contains possibly the world's largest collection of "airplane porthole" shots. Perera's other photographs show "haunting images of architecture, landscapes and urban settings mostly devoid of the human form." He very rarely features people in his photos unless they contribute to the composition of the shot.

== Other activities ==
Perera was the founder of Switzerland-based Language Direct, an online language teaching company established in 2004.

He is currently the CEO of Avilinga, a company offering translation solutions for the aviation industry, and the founder of nthspace, an artist's residency program with properties in Adelaide, Torino & Grímsey, Iceland (under construction).

Perera is involved in the support of Australian Aboriginal art through his private collection as well as philanthropic activities in the field.
