= Tina Tower =

Australian entrepreneur

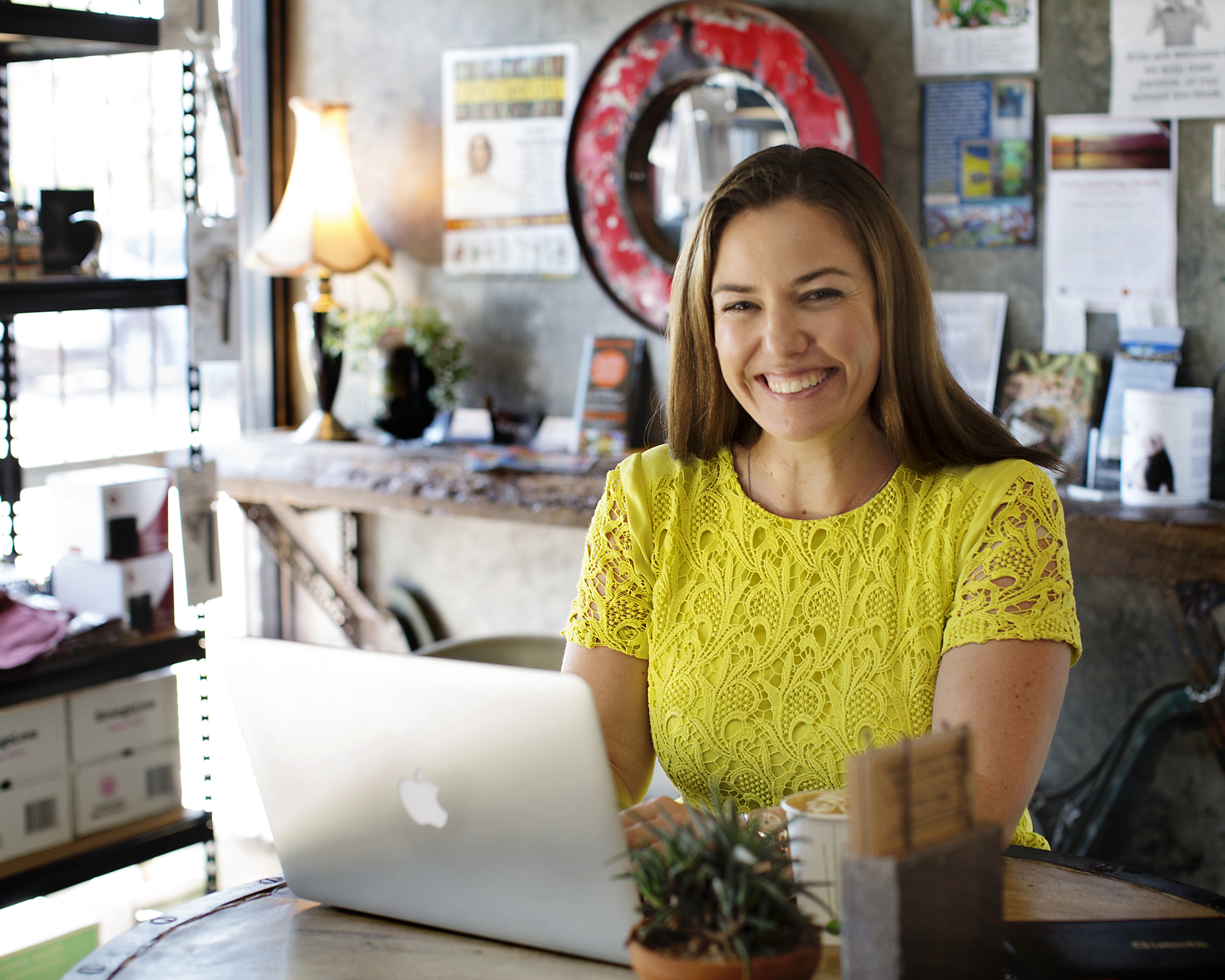
- Born: 9 January 1984 (age 42)
- Occupation: Entrepreneur
- Website: https://www.tinatower.com/

Tina Tower is an Australian businesswoman, entrepreneur, author, and high performance business consultant. She is the founder of the Begin Bright franchise, a school readiness and primary tutoring centre franchise. In 2014, Tina was the winner of the Australian Telstra Young Business Woman of the Year award. Tower was named by The Huffington Post as one of the Top 10 Aussie Women to watch in business.

== Career ==
Tower attended Robert Kiyosaki and Tony Robbins seminars as a teenager. She started her first business at age 20. The business, Reach Education Centre, was an educational toy store, birthday party place and tutoring centre. She gained a Bachelor in Primary Education from University of Sydney, and then founded Begin Bright, a school readiness and primary tutoring curriculum in 2008 within her own centres. In 2011, at the age of 27, Tower franchised Begin Bright, which has franchised centres across New South Wales, Victoria, Western Australia and Queensland. Tower built the franchise to 33 Begin Bright centres across Australia before Cognition Education acquired Begin Bright in 2016. Tower is a member of the Begin Bright Board.

Tower was named in The Educator Magazine Hotlist in 2016 as one of the Top 20 people shaping education in Australia. Tower has also been featured in The Australian Financial Review and Sky News Business Channel.

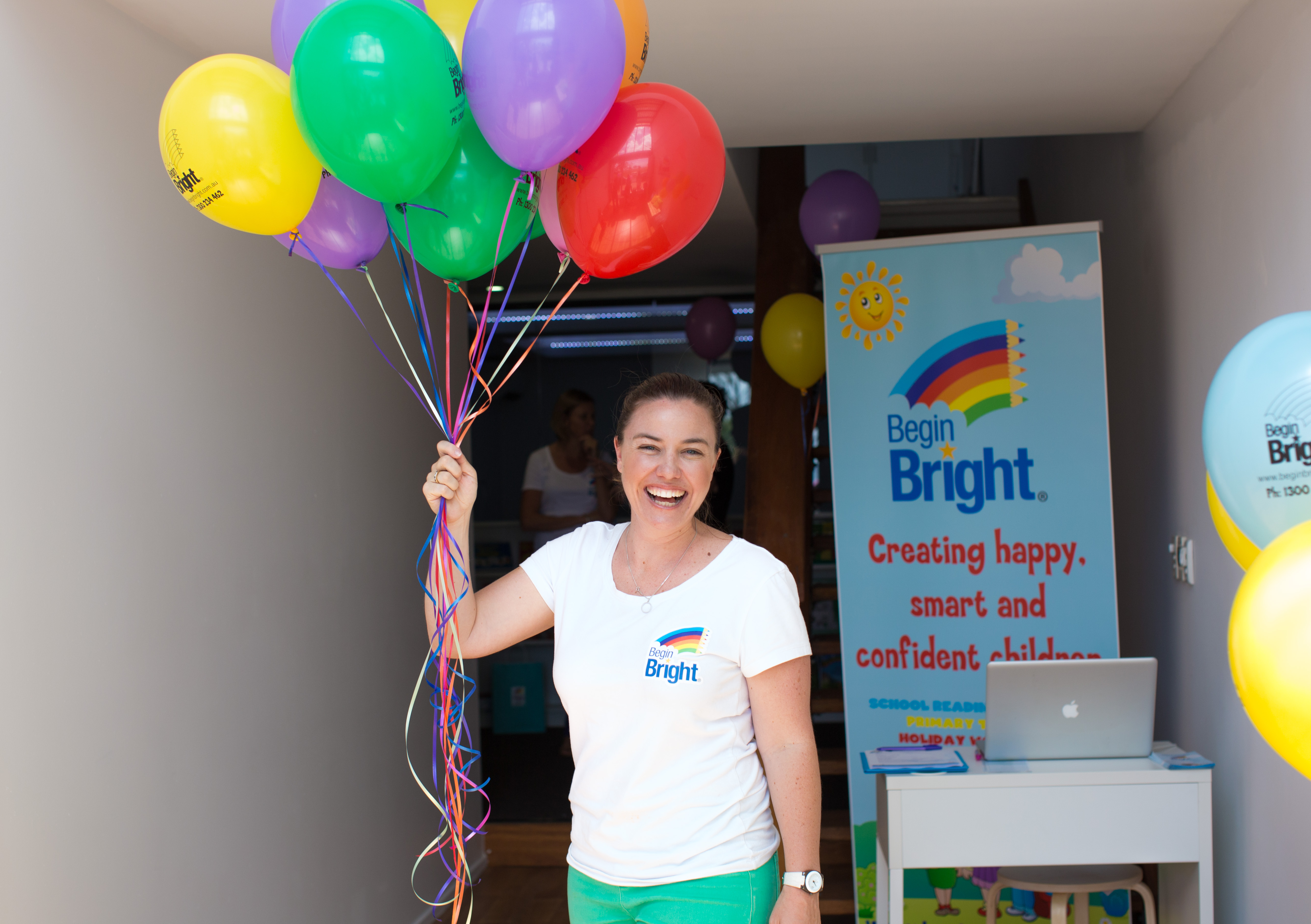

In 2017, Tower became Entrepreneur in Residence for Business Chicks, Australia's largest and most influential community for women. Tower is also a business consultant working with business owners to grow their businesses.

In 2017, Tower launched film production company Nikhedonia Productions with the film option rights to book titles.

== Controversy ==
In 2016 Tina Tower entered mediation with seven franchise owners over allegations she misled investors. An investor named Ms Yu, who holds a masters in teaching, says she abandoned the program because she was too embarrassed to give the worksheets to students because of the many spelling and mathematical errors. “I’ve been able to do better than other franchise owners because I didn’t use the resources, but I’m still paying for a program that’s full of mistakes,” Ms Yu said.

== Awards and recognition ==
- 2012 - Winner of My Business Magazine 'Woman in Business' and 'Overall business' winner
- 2013 - Winner of Australian Small Business Champions Award for Educational Services
- 2014 - Winner of Australian Telstra Young Business Woman of the Year
