= Finemore Holdings =

Australian logistics company

- Formerly: Finemores Transport; Finemore Haulage Contractors
- Traded as: ASX: FMH
- Industry: Logistics
- Founded: 1966; 60 years ago
- Founder: Ron Finemore
- Defunct: 2001; 25 years ago
- Fate: Taken over by Toll Holdings
- Headquarters: Wagga Wagga, Australia

Finemore Holdings, formerly Finemores Transport and Finemores Haulage Contractors, was an Australian logistics company.

== History ==
Initially trading as Finemores Haulage Contractors, the company was established in November 1966 by Ron Finemore in Wagga Wagga with an International hauling fuel to farms. It expanded into grain, fertilizer, livestock and processed meat haulage, securing a contract with meat processor RJ Gilbertson in Melbourne. It later began hauling sheep from western New South Wales to Melbourne. and diversified into general and refrigerated freight.

The businesses of Bruce Dickenson Transport, Dubbo, Bruce Marks Transport with depots in Hamilton, Mount Gambier and Wodonga, Clive Brothers Transport of Melbourne and Gills Transport with depots in Casino and Moree were purchased expanding the fleet to 160 trucks. In December 1979 it was placed in voluntary administration with Arthur Young & Co appointed as administrator.

The business was restructured with the fleet reduced to 70 trucks. Ron Finemore retained a 20% shareholding. It entered the car carrying business and would go onto become the largest national carrier with contracts with Ford and Holden. It came out of administration in September 1983 after a scheme of arrangement was agreed. In 1985 Wodger Corporation of Queanbeyan purchased a majority shareholding.

In 1986, Wodger Corporation was purchased by Ron Finemore and renamed Finemore Holdings in a reverse takeover. It moved into the interstate freight express market with purchase of AEI Group Transport Services, Sydney. In 1987 South Australian based Friendly Transport and Power Transport Group were purchased with over 100 vehicles.

It entered the fuel sector, winning Ampol’s distribution contract in Sydney and later Woolworths petrol business and in the 1990s, was awarded a contract by ExxonMobil in Thailand.

In June 2000 Toll Holdings launched a takeover offer. The bid was not successful with Toll only gaining a 68% acceptance when 90% was required, with Lindsay Fox using his 10.1% shareholding to veto the deal. A scheme of arrangement, that only required 75% acceptance, was accepted with the transaction completed in March 2001.

In 2004, after completing a non complete clause, Ron Finemore returned to the industry, purchasing Lewington's Transport and renaming it Ron Finemore Transport.
