= Con Kafataris =

Australian bookmaker

Con Kafataris is an Australian bookmaker. Having operated as a bookmaker in Sydney's betting ring for over 25 years, he is one of the city's leading rails bookmaker. He is a member and Director of the NSW Bookmakers' Co-operative Limited and is licensed by the Racing NSW the Australian Jockey Club Harness Racing NSW and the Greyhound Racing Association. Kafataris is also a licensed bookmaker in the Australian Capital Territory and South Australia.

Kafataris is CEO of Australia's second largest private sports betting company (Sportsbet is the largest), the Centrebet Group, which is the integration of Centrebet, SportOdds.com, and SuperOdds UK. Centrebet was the first sports book to be licensed in Australia and the first online in the southern hemisphere. The Group currently holds licences in the Northern Territory, Australian Capital Territory; Western Australia and the United Kingdom. The company was publicly listed in 2006 with Kafataris as managing director.

Kafataris started Sports Odds in the Australian Capital Territory in 1995 and started offering Internet sports betting in 1999. The company acquired Centrebet in 2003 for $46.5 million from Tabcorp and merged it with Sports Odds. The company is forecast to have a turnover of a billion Australian dollars during 2006–07.
