= Mark Selway =

Mark Wayne Selway (born June 1959) is an Australian businessman, CEO of IMI plc from 1 January 2014 to 9 March 2019. He replaced Martin Lamb.

Mark Wayne Selway was born in Australia in June 1959.

Selway is the former CEO of Weir Group, and before his appointment at IMI, had been CEO of Boral in Australia.
