= Harvie Picken =

Australian businessman

John Harvie Picken
- Born: 1888; Melbourne, Australia
- Died: 11 October 1974; Melbourne, Australia
- Occupation: Entrepreneur businessman

John Harvie Picken (born March 1888, Melbourne, Australia) was a prominent Australian businessman and member of the Picken family.

== Early life ==
Picken was born about 1888 in Melbourne. He was the son of Eleanor Dunkley and James Thompson Picken. Picken attended Armadale state school.

== Career ==
In 1936, Picken and his brother registered the new company Domino Polishes Pty Ltd.

In 1947, the printing business, J T Picken & Sons, was dissolved by Picken, his brother John, his son, James Douglas Picken and his nephew, Robert Bruce Picken and sold to the new company J T Pickens & Sons Proprietary Ltd. The family also owned the canning and packaging business, Containers Ltd, which would be bought Australian Paper Mills (APM) which would later become. Amcor Limited.

In 1952, Picken ran for election to the committee of the Melbourne Racing Club. Picken was part owner, with Norman Russell, of the horses, Boondale and Tarboon.

He was the Deputy President of the Victorian Chamber of Manufactures in 1963, and President of the Victorian Chamber of Manufactures in 1964. Picken retired in 1965. He was succeeded by L. H. Waite.

== Awards and honours ==
The Menzies Picken trophy is named for him and Robert Menzies, former Prime Minister of Australia.

The horse race, the Harvie Picken Handicap, is also named for him.

== Personal life and death ==
Picken married Veronica Barker in 1917.

He died in Melbourne on 11 October 1974. He was 86.

== Bibliography ==
- E.K. Sinclair, "The Spreading Tree, A history of APM and Amcor 1844–1989", Allen and Unwin, 1990. ISBN 978-0-04-442355-3.

== See also ==
- Amcor Limited
- John Thompson Picken
