= Alan Oxley =

Australian diplomat

Alan Oxley is an Australian diplomat.

== Biography ==
Oxley worked for the Australian Department of Foreign Affairs and Trade and sometimes in the United Nations in both New York City and Geneva. He became an ambassador to the General Agreement on Tariffs and Trade in 1985 and served there till 1989 until he got a job as a chairman of its contracting parties and of Asia-Pacific Economic Cooperation. He is also a founder of a non-profit organization called World Growth and appeared in various newspapers and news networks. On October 27, 2010, he was accused by many scientists of misrepresentation.
