= Ron Knapp =

Australian businessman

Ron Knapp was the CEO of the Australian Aluminium Council from 2002 to 2008, having previously led the World Coal Institute. In December 2008 he became Secretary-General of the International Aluminium Institute.
