= List of largest aluminum producers by output =

Below is a list of the largest aluminum-producing companies by output (in 1,000,000 metric tons), accurate as of 2022 according to Statista.

| No. | Company | Output | Headquarters |
|---|---|---|---|
| 1 | Chinalco | 7.1 | China |
| 2 | Hongqiao Group | 6 | China |
| 3 | Rusal | 3.8 | Russia |
| 4 | Xinfa Group | 3.6 | China |
| 5 | Rio Tinto | 3 | UK |
| 6 | EGA | 2.7 | UAE |
| 7 | SPIC | 2.5 | China |
| 8 | Vedanta | 2.3 | India |
| 9 | East Hope | 2.2 | China |
| 10 | Norsk Hydro | 2.1 | Norway |

== See also ==
- List of largest manufacturing companies by revenue
- List of public corporations by market capitalization
- List of largest financial services companies by revenue
- List of largest European manufacturing companies by revenue
- List of largest companies by revenue
