= John Mulcahy (businessman) =

Australian businessman

John Mulcahy is an Australian businessman who has held various chief executive roles.

== Career ==
Mulcahy has held a number of non-executive positions, including:

- Guardian of the Future Fund
- Non-executive director of Mirvac
- Non-executive director and chairman of Coffey International
- Non-executive director of GWA Group
- Non-executive director of the Great Barrier Reef Foundation\
- Chairman of the advisory board of Pottinger
- Managing Director and Chief Executive Officer of Suncorp
- Group Executive of Investment and Insurance Services division at the Commonwealth Bank
- held a number of senior roles during his 14 years at Lendlease, including Chief Executive Officer of Lend Lease Property Investment and Chief Executive Officer of Civil & Civic.
- Non-executive chairman of Orix Australia

Mulcahy graduated with a Doctor of Philosophy in Engineering (University of Sydney) and is a Fellow of the Institute of Engineers.
