= Mark Rowsthorn =

Australian businessman

Mark Rowsthorn is an Australian businessman in the transport industry. He was an executive director of Toll Group. From its creation in 2007 until February 2011 he was CEO of one of Australia's largest transport companies, Asciano, and he became CEO of the transport firm McAleese in 2014.

== Career ==
Mark Rowsthorn's father, Peter Rowsthorn, was formerly chairman of Toll Group. Along with Paul Little, Peter Rowsthorn bought the company in 1986. Mark Rowsthorn had an estimated net worth of US$325M in 2006, when he was executive director of Toll, and Forbes magazine named him as the 36th-richest person in Australia and New Zealand in 2006.

When Asciano was separated from Toll in June 2007, Rowsthorn became CEO and managing director of Asciano. He had to relinquish his interests in Toll Group as part of the break-up. In February 2011 Asciano's chairman announced the surprise replacement of Rowsthorn by John Mullen, saying that the company needed a different leader for its next phase of growth.

In March 2014 it was announced that Rowsthorn would replace Paul Garaty as CEO of the transport firm McAleese. Rowsthorn was reported to own almost 30 per cent of McAleese, which had been the subject of criticism about its poor safety record. A number of trucks owned by the company were defected after one of them lost control and caused a fatal accident.

He was later chairman of Rivet Mining Services that was formed after the collapse of McAleese in 2017.

=== Savoy Tavern ===
As of 2014 Rowsthorn owned the Savoy Tavern on the corner of Spencer and Bourke streets in Melbourne. It was closed for 20 years and becoming increasingly derelict, at one time being described by Melbourne Lord Mayor Robert Doyle as a "scab" on the city. Rowsthorn originally refused to do anything to improve the property, so Doyle said he would resort to a personal appeal to Rowsthorn to allow Melbourne City Council to demolish the building and install a park. However, it was reported in May 2013 that the tavern would be renovated and reopened as a bar, with a café attached. The reopening took place in March 2014.
