= Toll Group =

Australian-based logistics company

- Type: Subsidiary
- Industry: Freight Forwarding; Logistics; Transportation
- Founded: 1888
- Founder: Albert Toll
- Headquarters: Melbourne, Australia
- Key people: Alan Beacham (Managing Director); Thomas Knudsen (Chairman)
- Revenue: $5.8 billion (2023)
- Number of employees: 16,000 (October 2023)
- Parent: Japan Post Holdings
- Website: tollgroup.com

Toll Group is an Australian freight company that operates a logistics and global freight forwarding network spanning 150 countries, with over 20,000 customers. Toll has more than 16,000 workers across 500 sites. It is a subsidiary of Japan Post Service.

== History ==
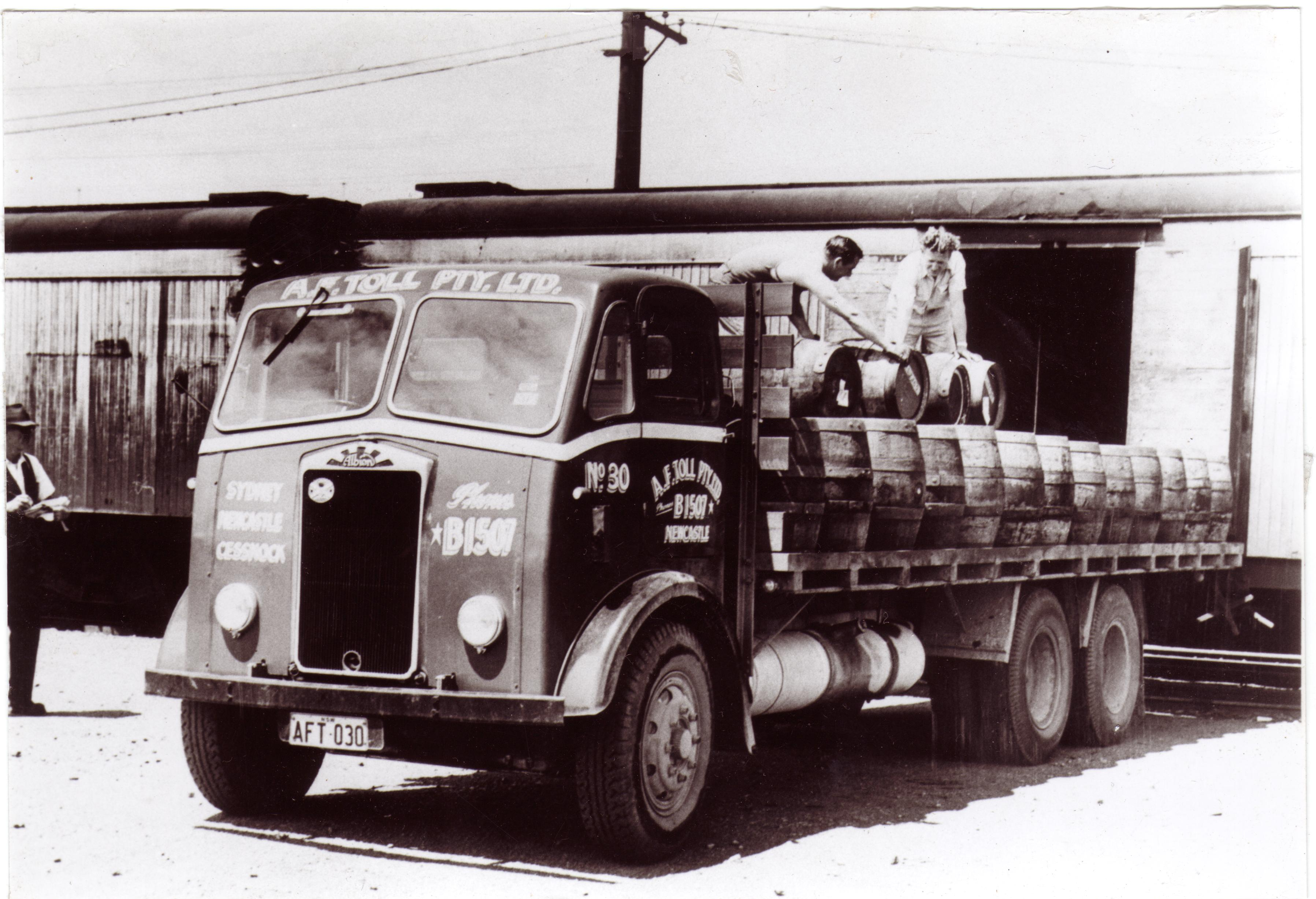
An AF Toll Albion flatbed truck

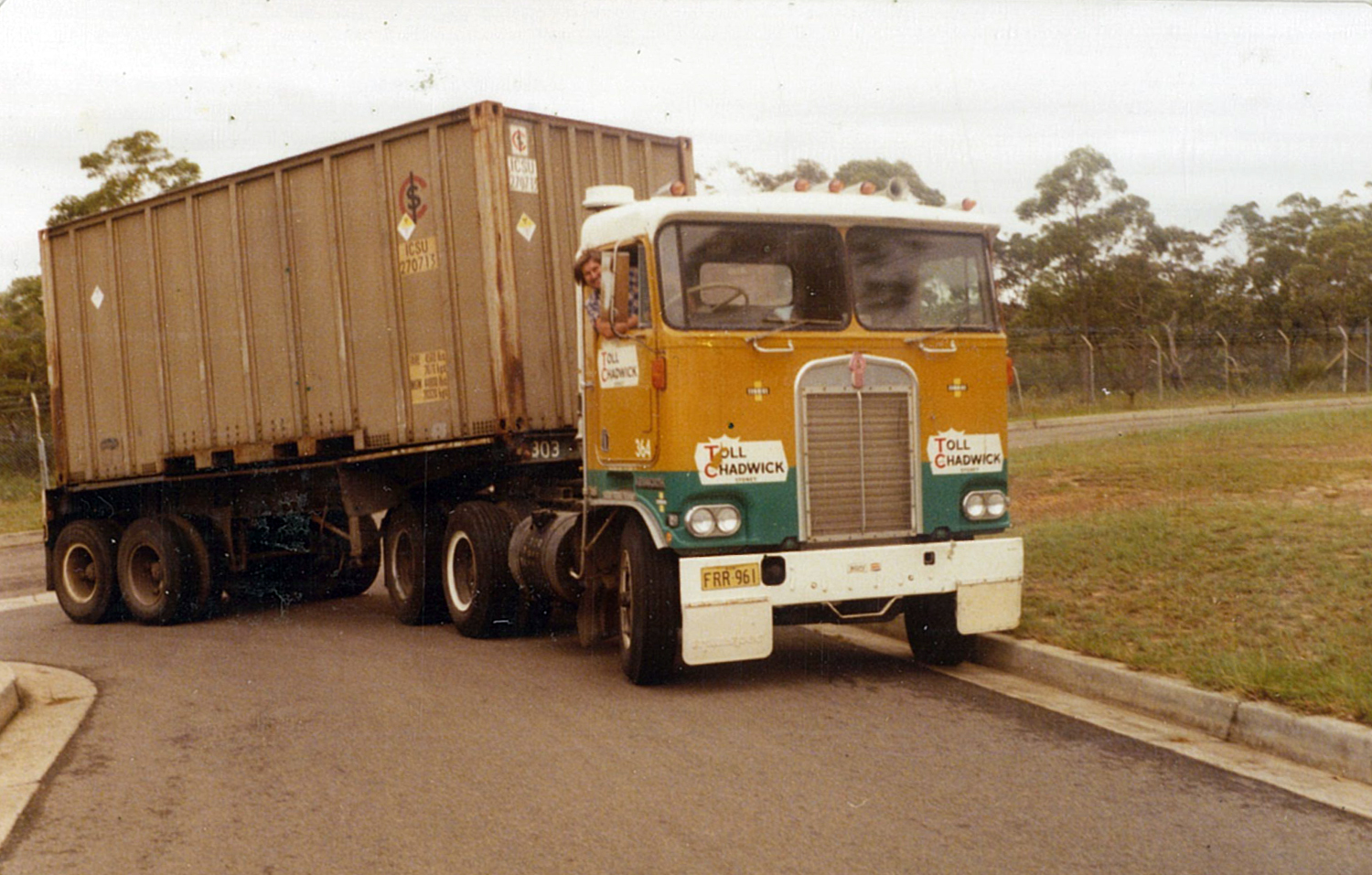
A Toll-Chadwick Kenworth K series

Albert Toll established Toll in Newcastle, New South Wales, in 1888. The business began by moving coal with horse and cart, and by the time of Albert's death at 95 in 1958, Toll was running a range of fleet trucks from five different locations.

National Minerals purchased the business in 1959. It then became a part of mining conglomerate Peko Wallsend a decade later. Peko Wallsend utilised the Toll transport business for all its transporting needs, making Toll a popular domestic carrier across the country.

The business changed name to Toll-Chadwick when its new owners wanted to blend their businesses and start using containerised shipping. By the mid-1980s, Toll-Chadwick had evolved into one of Australia’s most significant transport companies, operating beyond the nation’s capital cities.

Toll was purchased by its management team in 1986 by Toll’s first Chairman, Peter Rowsthorn and Toll’s Managing Director at the time, Paul Little. The duo developed the business through acquiring modest, strategically located transport companies.

=== Public company ===
In 1993, Toll was listed on the Australian Securities Exchange (ASX).

After its listing on the ASX, Toll progressively built its reach and service capabilities via a program of strategic acquisitions. In the process, Toll expanded its operations in logistics and freight forwarding across the Asia-Pacific region.

In June 2000 Toll Holdings launched a takeover offer for Finemore Holdings. The bid was not successful with Toll only gaining a 68% acceptance when 90% was required, with Lindsay Fox using his 10.1% shareholding to veto the deal. A scheme of arrangement, that only required 75% acceptance, was accepted with the transaction completed in March 2001.

In 2003, Toll acquired New Zealand rail, road and ferry operator Tranz Rail, while selling the rail network to the New Zealand Government. Tranz Rail was later renamed Toll Rail. Toll then sold Toll Rail, without its trucking operation, to the government in 2008.

Toll’s acquisition of SembCorp Logistics (SembLog) in 2006 significantly increased Toll’s market presence and reach across South East Asia, Greater China and the Indian Sub-Continent. In this period, Toll acquired ST Logistics, a standalone subsidiary business in Singapore, which supports the Singapore Government with logistics in healthcare, defence, and homeland security.

In 2008 Toll acquired BALtrans Logistics. In 2009 Toll acquired Express Logistics Group, one of New Zealand's largest freight forwarding companies. In the same year Toll acquired Logistic Distribution Systems, a Dubai-based international freight forwarding company.

In 2010 Toll acquired United States freight forwarder Summit Logistics. In 2010 they acquired WT SeaAir and Genesis Forwarding. The acquisitions added significant scale to the Toll Global Forwarding division in Europe.

In 2011 Toll acquired SAT Albatros, a Dubai-based provider of sea-air services.

By 2014, Toll had 40,000 team members across 1,200 locations in more than 50 countries, and annual revenue of $6.5 billion.

=== Japan Post acquisition ===
On 18 February 2015, Toll's Board announced that it had accepted a proposal from Japan Post to acquire all of Toll's shares. Japan Post was looking to Toll to grow its global logistics operations and expansion across Asia.

On 13 May 2015, Toll shareholders voted in favour of the acquisition. On 28 May 2015, Toll formally became a division of Japan Post. Toll remained headquartered in Melbourne and retained the Toll brand in Australia and around the world.

Toll continued to grow in Asia, investing AU$228 million in Toll City, a multi-story logistics facility in Singapore in 2017.

In 2020, Toll divested its logistics business in the United States, maintaining its freight forwarding operations; and on 1 September 2021, the Toll Global Express business in Australia and New Zealand was sold to Allegro Funds and rebranded Team Global Express.

In 2023, Toll acquired a business in Australia, ASQ, an operator of uncrewed aircraft systems (drone), and became the majority shareholder in its joint venture in Dubai, CWT-SML.

Today, Toll has dual headquarters in Melbourne and Singapore, with contract logistics operations across the Asia Pacific and a global freight forwarding business. In 2023, the company had 10,00 team members globally, 20,000 customers, and revenue of AU5.6 billion.

In October 2024, Pel-Air was purchased from Regional Express Holdings.

== Toll's service offering ==
=== Freight forwarding ===
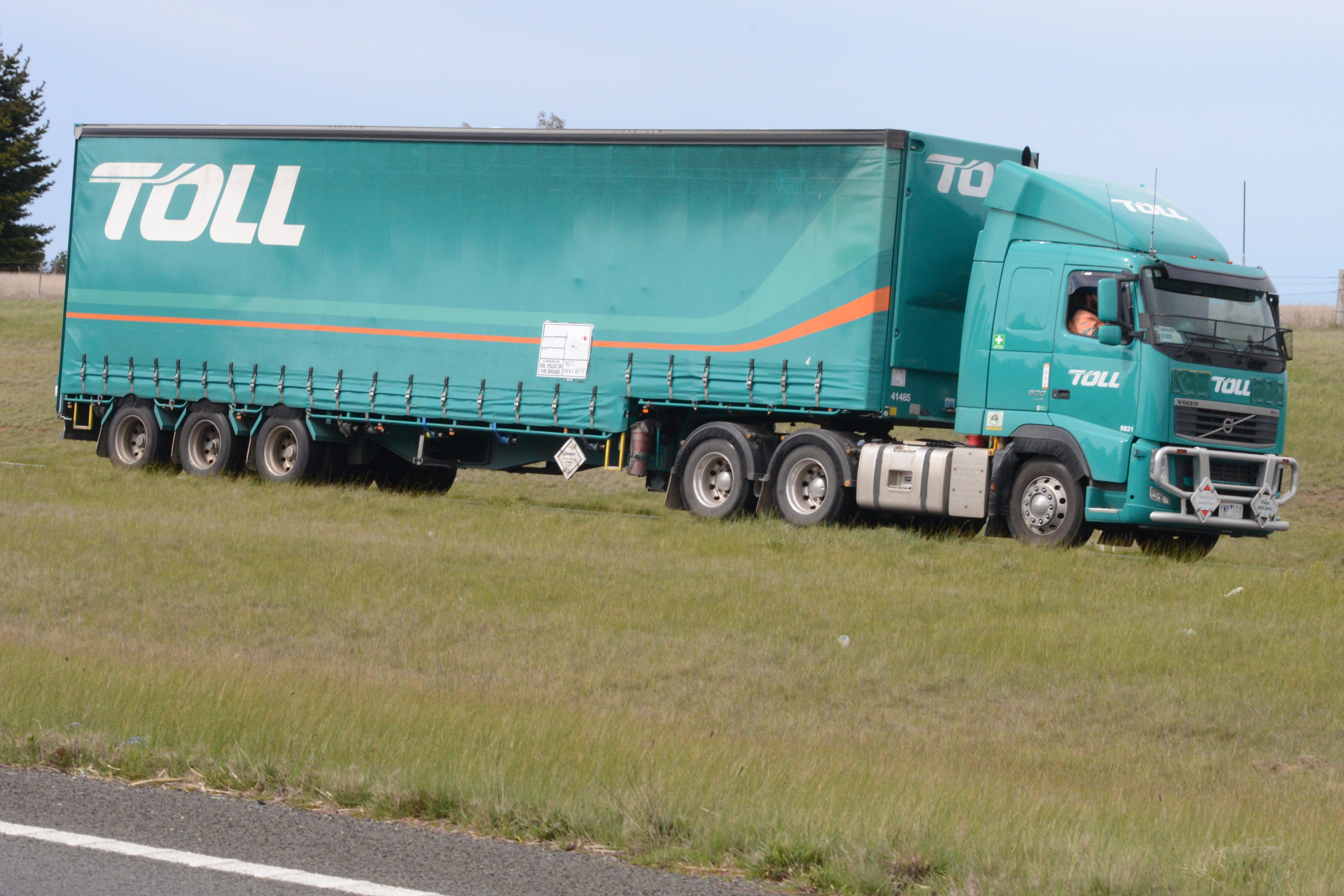
A Toll Volvo FH semi-trailer truck in Ballarat in August 2013

Toll provides international freight forwarding and supply chain management services that range from airport-to-(air)port and door-to-door freight forwarding movements to complex supply chain services and project movements involving over-dimensional, out-of-gauge, and heavy haulage cargo.

Headquartered in Singapore, Toll Global Forwarding operates in four regions: Australia and New Zealand; Asia; Europe, Middle East, and Africa; and North America. It has 90 sites in 28 markets which, combined with an agent network, services more than 150 markets. It is one of the largest freight forwarders on the Asia to Australia, New Zealand, and USA corridors.

In 2023, Toll Global Forwarding managed around 500,000 air and ocean freight shipments.

=== Contract logistics ===
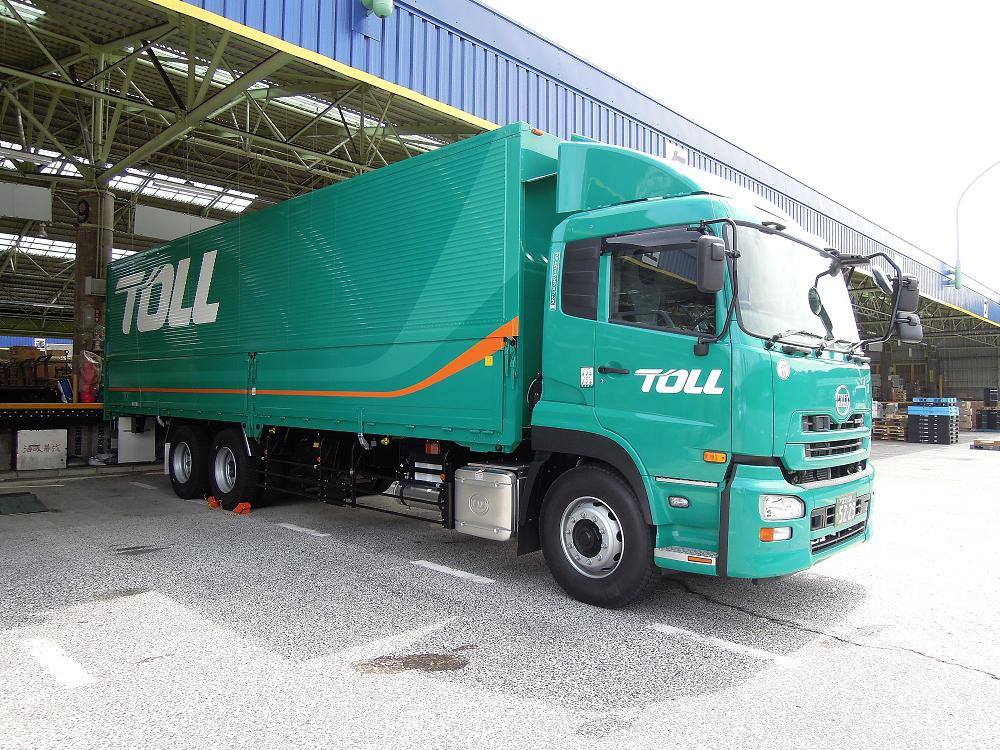
A Toll UD delivery truck in Japan

Toll provides warehousing and transportation contract logistics across the Asia Pacific region, including Australia, Singapore, Malaysia, Indonesia, Vietnam, Thailand, India, China, Taiwan and Korea.

Toll provides end-to-end supply chain services for a range of industries including retail and consumer, grocery, healthcare, automotive, industrial, energy, government and defence.

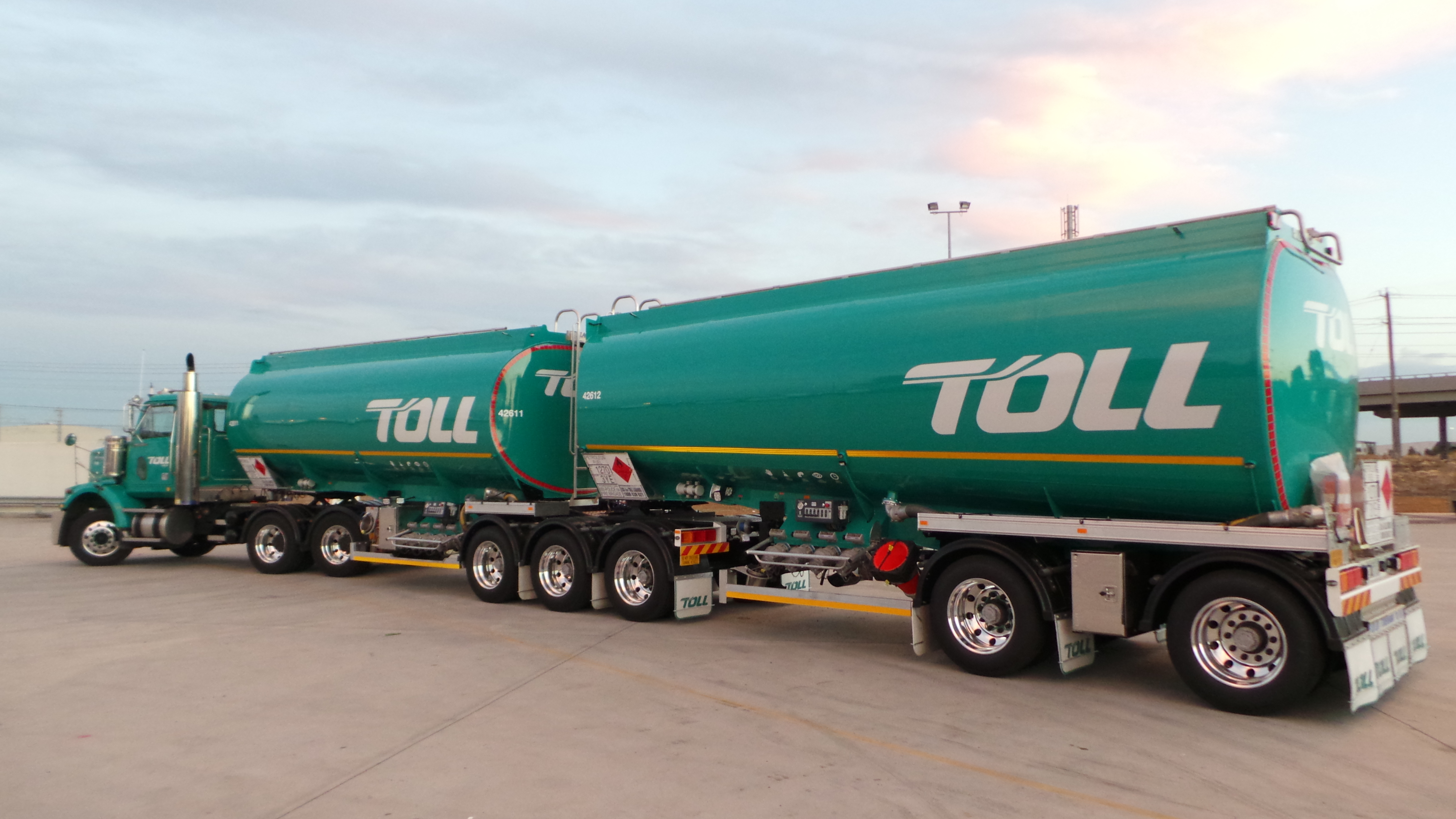
A Toll fuel tanker

The company operates 500 plus warehouse facilities and a transportation fleet of more than 44,000 vehicles, vessels, plant and equipment.

Toll provides logistics, transport and warehouse distribution including:

- Automated warehousing design
- Omni-channel and ecommerce
- Dedicated, specialised higher capacity transport
- Advanced, integrated telematics for bulk transport.

Toll is the first and only service provider to operate a fleet of Super B-doubles on a fixed route in Singapore and operates the Toll Helicopter ambulance rescue services in Australia.

== Former divisions ==
- Toll Domestic Forwarding apparently disappeared in a restructuring in 2017.
- Toll Resources & Government Logistics, assumed restructured.

=== IPEC ===
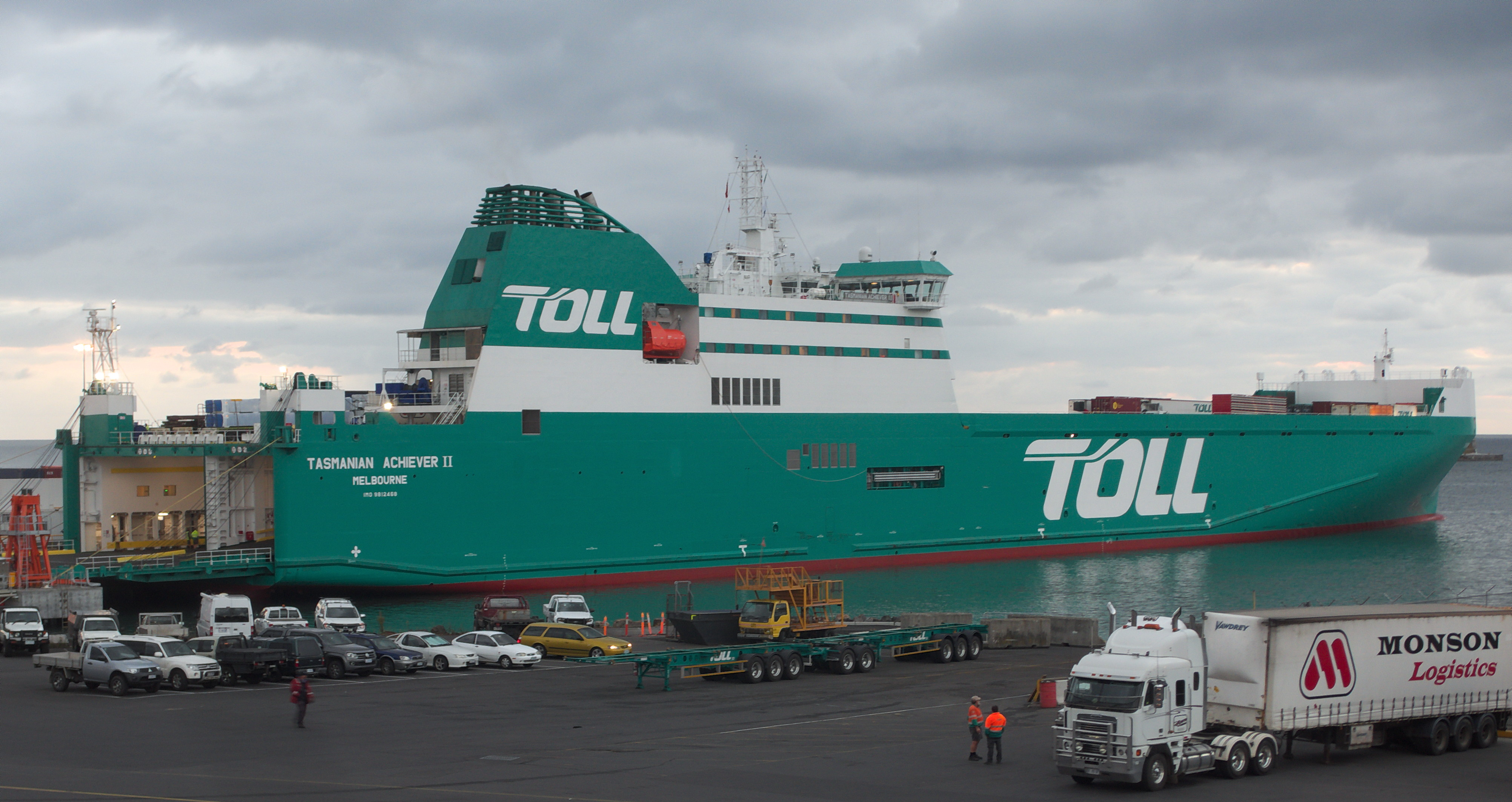
Tasmanian Achiever II at the Port of Burnie in March 2019

The Interstate Parcel Express Company (IPEC) was established in January 1954 and operated two Peugeot utility vehicles on express parcel services from Adelaide to Melbourne. It was later taken over by university friends Greg Farrell (of the Federal Group) and Gordon Barton. By 1968 it was operating in all Australian capital cities.

In 1963, IPEC commenced operating interstate air freight services from Melbourne to Launceston service commencing with Douglas DC-3s chartered from Brain & Brown operating three services per night.In 1966 IPEC began operating another interstate air freight service between Brisbane and Cowra that contravened the Two Airlines Policy using a chartered Air Express Holdings Bristol Freighter, where it connected with trucks to Melbourne. IPEC had already purchased a Douglas DC-4 in England, however the federal government would not allow it into Australia. The Cowra service ceased in 1967.

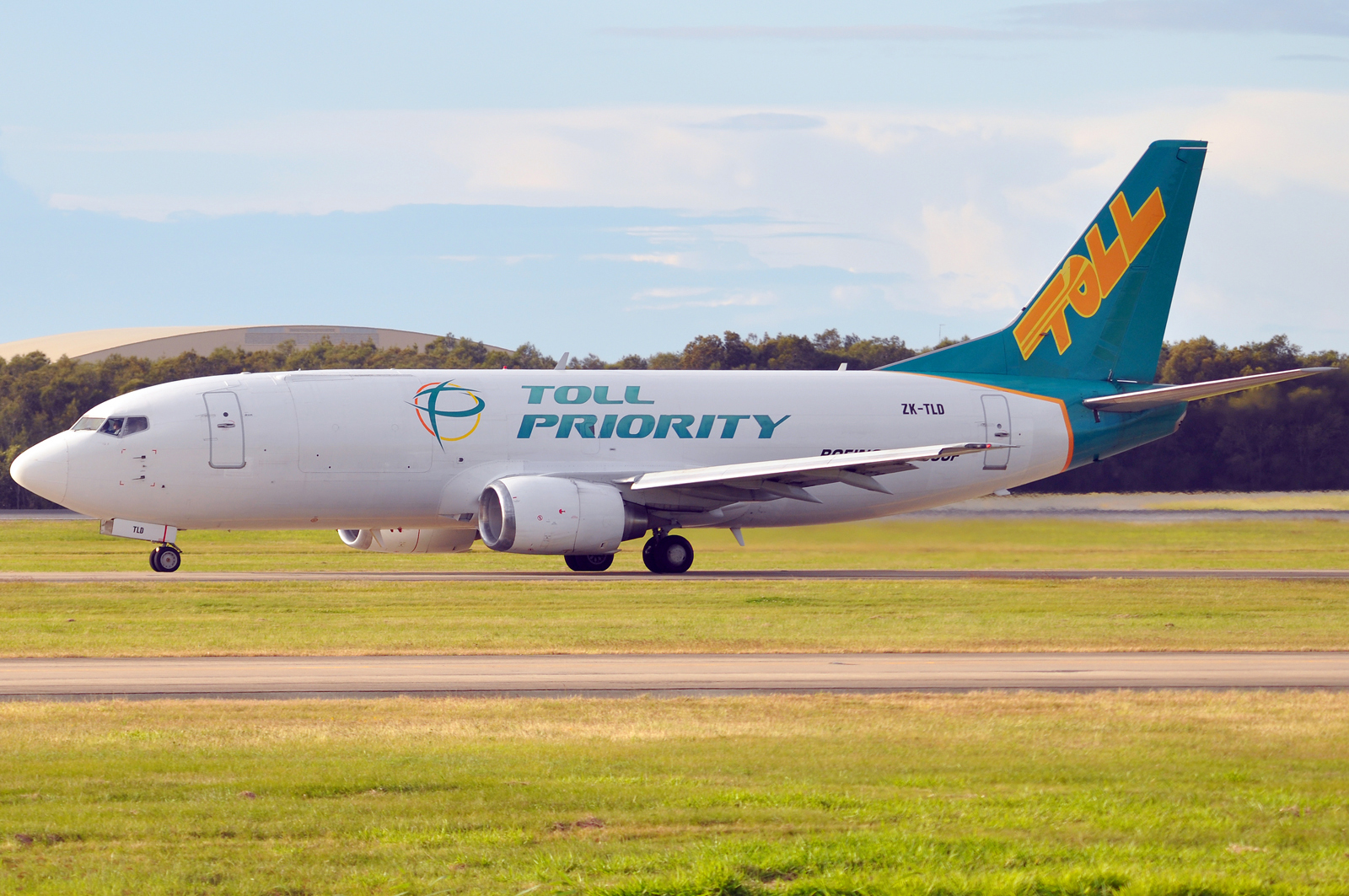
Toll Priority Boeing 737 at Brisbane Airport in 2011

In 1977 IPEC imported two Argosys followed by a further two in 1978. In 1979, IPEC commenced operating services between Melbourne, Sydney and Brisbane using chartered East-West Airlines Fokker F27 Friendships. A Douglas DC-9 was purchased in 1982.

In October 1979, IPEC purchased British freight company Sayer Transport Group. In December 1980 it purchased Skypack International with operations in 26 countries. IPEC owned the Angus & Robertson publishing business until selling it to News Corporation in May 1981. In 1983 Skypack International was sold to Thomas Nationwide Transport.

In 1983 Mayne Nickless purchased a 50% shareholding. In 1998 IPEC was purchased by Toll and rebranded Toll IPEC.

In July 2007, Toll Holdings Limited acquired Victorian Express Pty Ltd which provided intrastate express freight services within Victoria.

=== Global Express ===
Toll Global Express was a logistics and transportation division of the group. In 2012 it had plans to extend its compressed natural gas-powered fleet to more than 70 trucks. In 2014 it announced a $150-million, 71,000-square-metre, parcel-sorting centre near Melbourne Airport, to be built in partnership with Australia Pacific Airports.

Toll agreed to sell the division to Allegro Funds in April 2021. In 2022 it was rebranded Team Global Express. The Toll Shipping business was rebranded Strait Link.

Texel Air Australasia also won a contract in March 2024 for Team Global Express, operating with B737-800 converted freighters under the call sign "Team Air".

== See also ==
- List of oldest companies in Australia
