= Peter Rowsthorn (businessman) =

Australian businessman (1930–2021)

- Born: 12 June 1930; Kew, Victoria, Australia
- Died: 12 December 2021 (aged 91); Melbourne, Australia
- Occupation: Businessman
- Family: Mark Rowsthorn (son) Peter Rowsthorn Jr. (son)

Peter Rowsthorn (12 June 1930 – 12 December 2021) was an Australian businessman.

Rowsthorn was born in Kew, Victoria on 12 June 1930. He was the chairman of Toll Holdings, Australia's largest transport company, having bought the company with Paul Little in 1986. He was later the owner of Wadham Park and Woodside, a horse training facility and a stud farm respectively. Rowsthorn died in Melbourne on 12 December 2021, at the age of 91.
