= Toll Domestic Forwarding =

- Type: Division
- Industry: Transportation; Logistics; Courier
- Founded: 1888
- Founder: Albert Toll
- Headquarters: Melbourne and Auckland
- Area served: Australia/New Zealand
- Services: Integrated Service Provider
- Revenue: A$1.1541 billion (2014)
- Net income: A$66.5 million (2014)
- Number of employees: 5,660 (2014)
- Parent: Japan Post Holdings
- Divisions: Toll NQX; Toll Express; Toll Intermodal; Toll Shipping; Toll New Zealand; Toll Tasmania
- Website: http://www.tollgroup.com

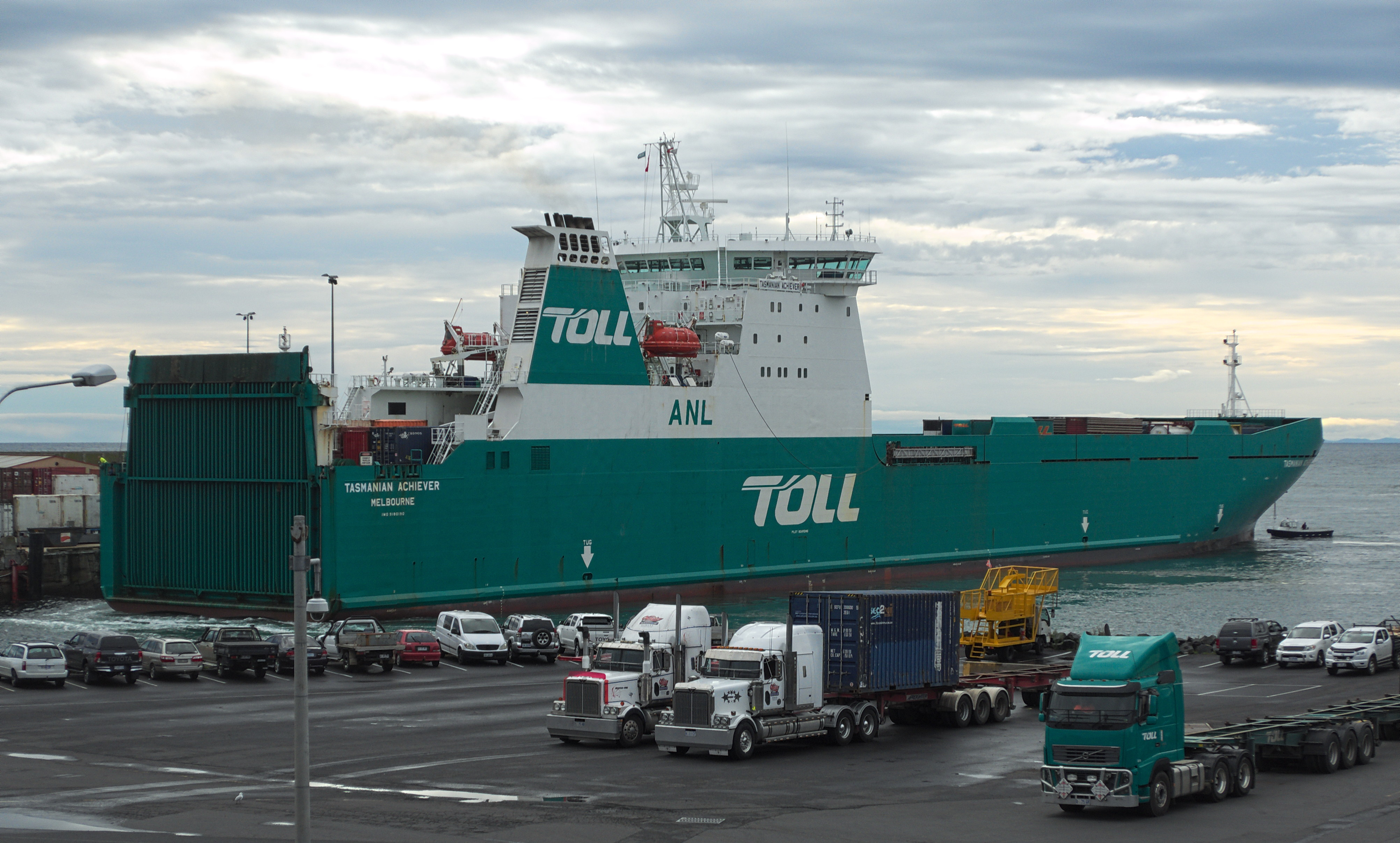
Tasmanian Achiever in 2017

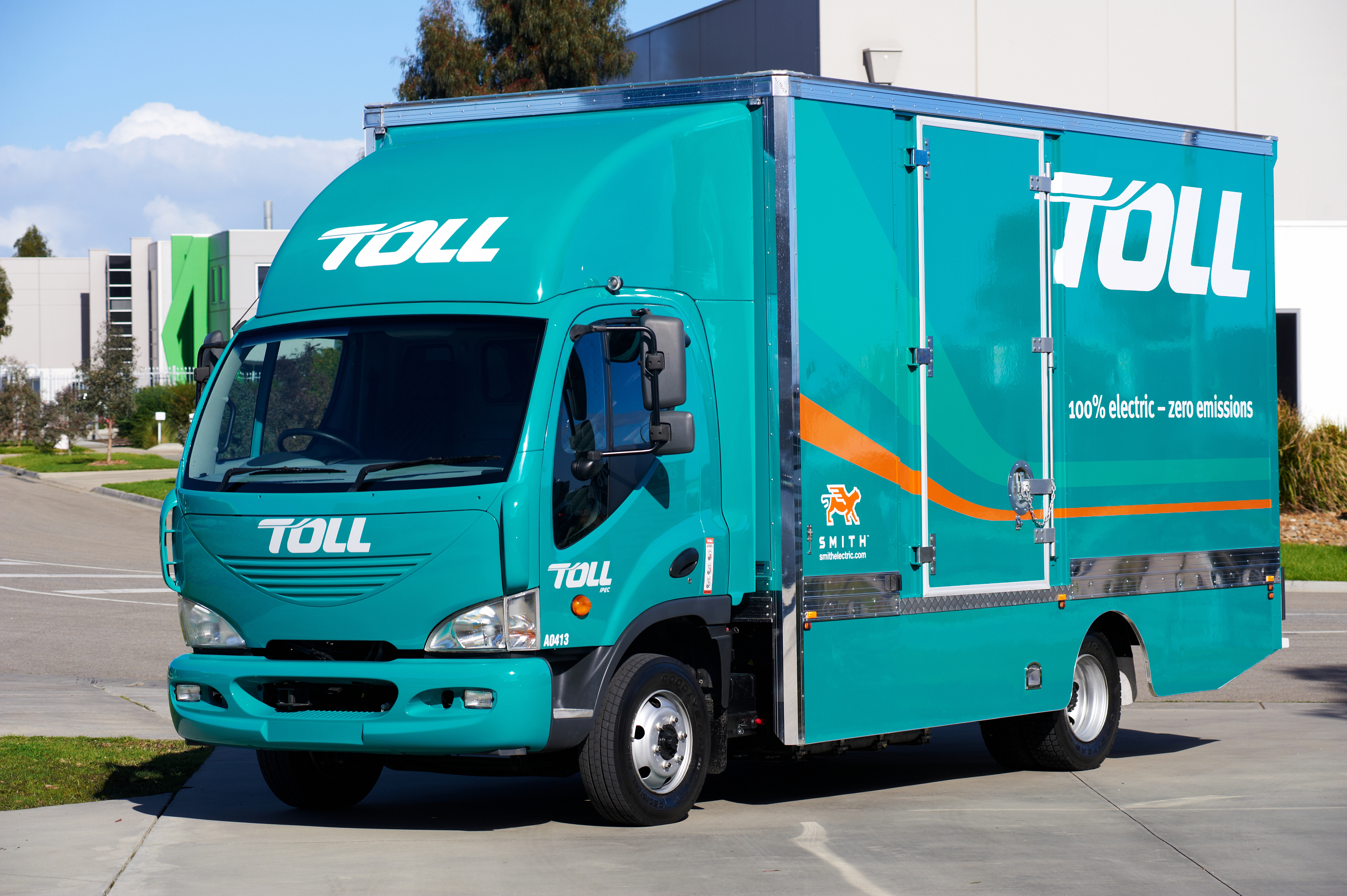
Toll's 10-tonne electric truck by Smith Electric. It has a range of up to 200km and a top speed 95km/h. It runs on a lithium-ion 80kW battery, requires 5-6 hours overnight charge, and is zero-emission.

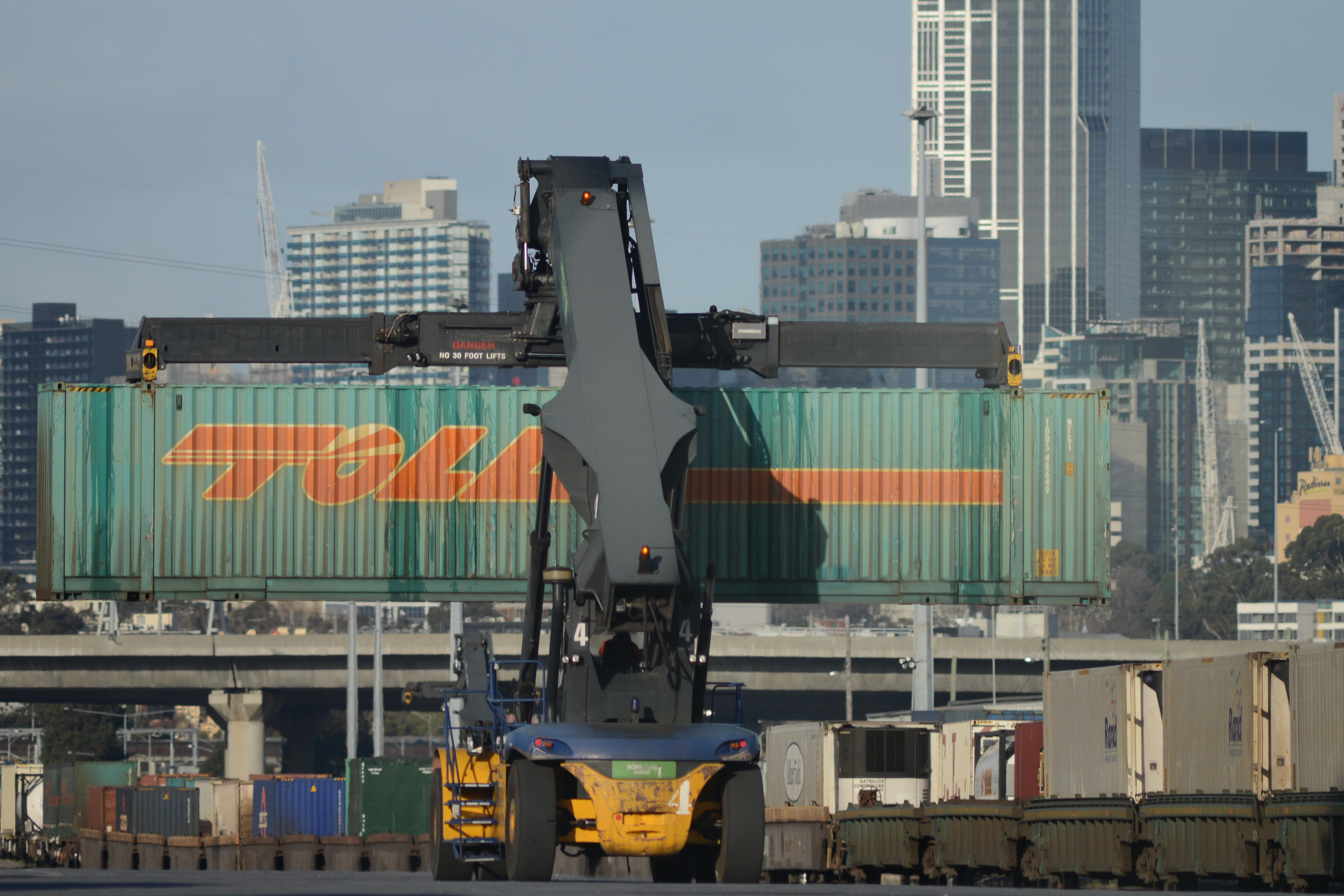
Toll Intermodal - Melbourne CBD

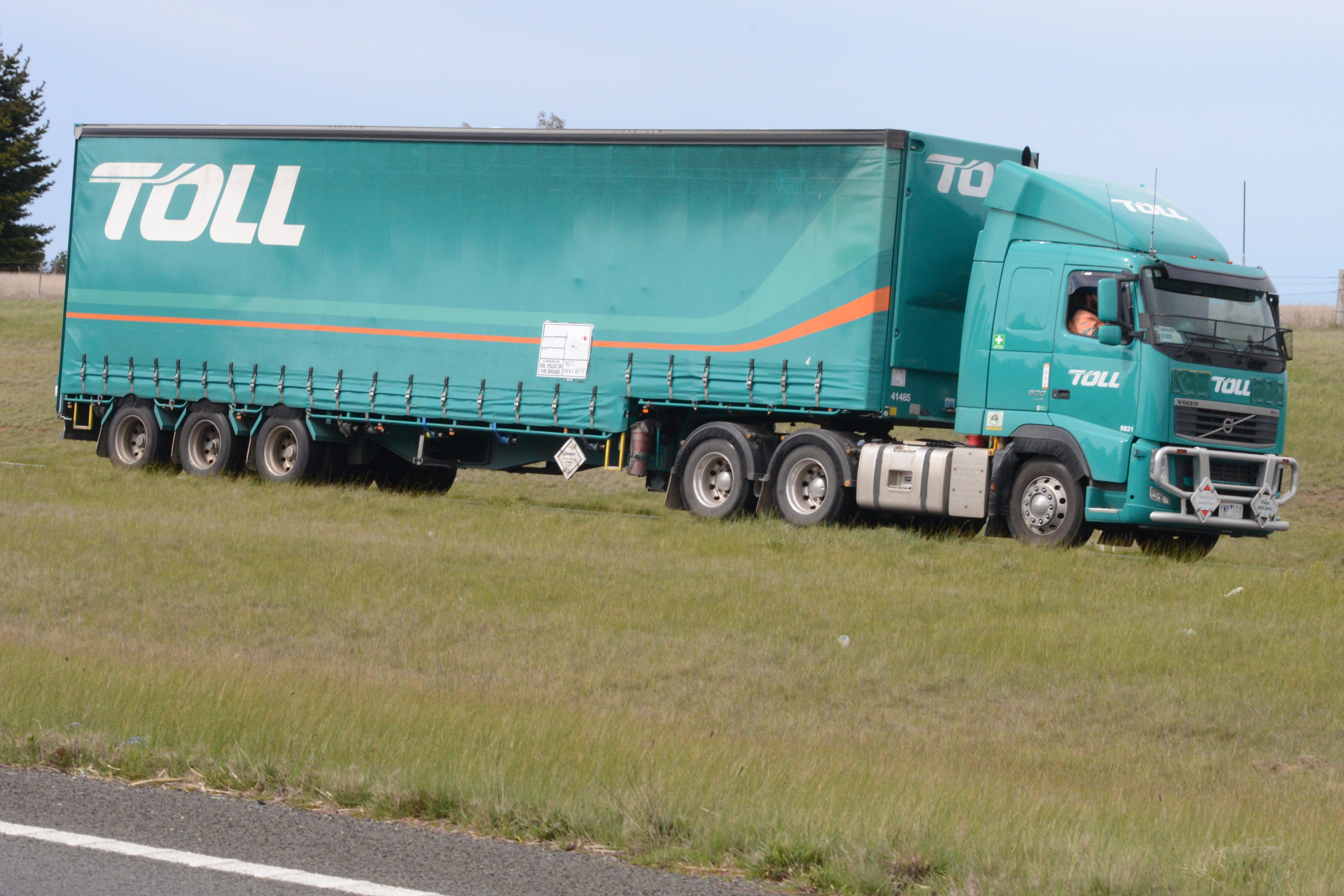
Toll Volvo FH

Toll Domestic Forwarding (TDF) is a division of the Toll Group specialising in freight forwarding by road, rail and sea within and between Australia and New Zealand.

Toll is Australia’s largest mover of freight. Toll New Zealand is New Zealand’s second largest freight mover. In March 2012, Toll New Zealand reported they moved more than 2.9 million consignments and in excess of 4.2 million tonnes of freight per annum. They also reported they served more than 4,000 customers.

== Services ==
Toll Domestic Forwarding offers full and part container and truck load freight transport services including: road freight forwarding; rail freight forwarding; coastal shipping; multimodal forwarding; temperature controlled freight forwarding; cross-docking; warehouse and storage services (such as bonded warehousing and temperature controlled storage); and vehicle transportation.

== Fleet ==
Toll Intermodal has extensive domestic freight forwarding coverage in Australia, providing end-to-end multimodal road, rail and sea service. Toll Intermodal is part of the Bowmans Rail joint venture that operates Australia's largest inland container terminal at Bowmans, South Australia.

Toll New Zealand is New Zealand's largest transport and logistics company, offering a range of services including nationwide rail, road and sea multimodal transport services, complete logistics services, vehicle transportation, and office and household relocations. The company started in July 2003 when Toll Holdings purchased an 85% stake in Tranz Rail. Toll New Zealand operates a fleet of more than 950 owner driver and company owned vehicles ranging from small courier vans to heavy 50 tonne truck rigs. When transporting vehicles Toll New Zealand uses specially-constructed, fully enclosed rail wagons. Toll Shipping operates roll on / roll off vessels on Bass Strait, offering two-way shipping services between Tasmania and mainland Australia six days a week. Toll Shipping has two dedicated terminals one at Webb Dock in Melbourne and the other at McGaw Wharf in Burnie. Toll Tasmania is the largest freight forwarder to and from Tasmania specialising in palletised and bulk transport. Toll moves the equivalent of 150,000, (20 foot long) containers and approximately 10,000 cars across Bass Strait each year.

In 2013 Toll purchased the Trans-Bass freight forwarding service from Linfox.

Toll Express is Australia's largest express pallet carrier and focuses on time-sensitive part load and pallet movements.

Toll NQX focuses on the mining, metal and resources sectors in Queensland and the Northern Territory. In 2014 Toll NQX acquired Deeson Heavylift, a specialist heavy haulage, based at Bowen Basin in Queensland.

=== Ships ===
- Tasmanian Achiever (1999–2019)
- Victorian Reliance (1999–2019)
- Tasmanian Achiever II (2019–present)
- Victorian Reliance II (2019–present)

== Reach ==
Toll Intermodal employs over 1,000 people and operates 22 depots across Australia. Toll New Zealand has 19 branches throughout the country.

Toll Express employs over 2,000 people, has 30 company-owned branches and a turnover of over $400 million.

Toll NQX employs 1,500 people and has 24 branches Australia-wide. Each week Toll NQX delivers 43,000 consignments through 2,000 scheduled road services.

== Warehousing and storage ==
TDF has considerable warehousing and storage space. Specifically in Auckland, Wellington and Christchurch in New Zealand Toll has 120,000 square metres of warehousing space.

Toll Intermodal has a 55,000 sq metre facility at Kewdale in Western Australia.

The Toll Group operates strategically located warehousing facilities in major locations around the world, including key trade gateways in Australia, New Zealand, Asia, America, South Africa, Europe, and the Middle East.

== Certification and accreditations ==
- ISO 9001 — Quality Management Systems
- HACCP — Hazard analysis and critical control points

== See also ==
- Toll Group
- Toll Global Forwarding
- Toll Global Logistics
- Toll Resources & Government Logistics
- Toll Global Express
