= Jolly Blue =

Cargo ship

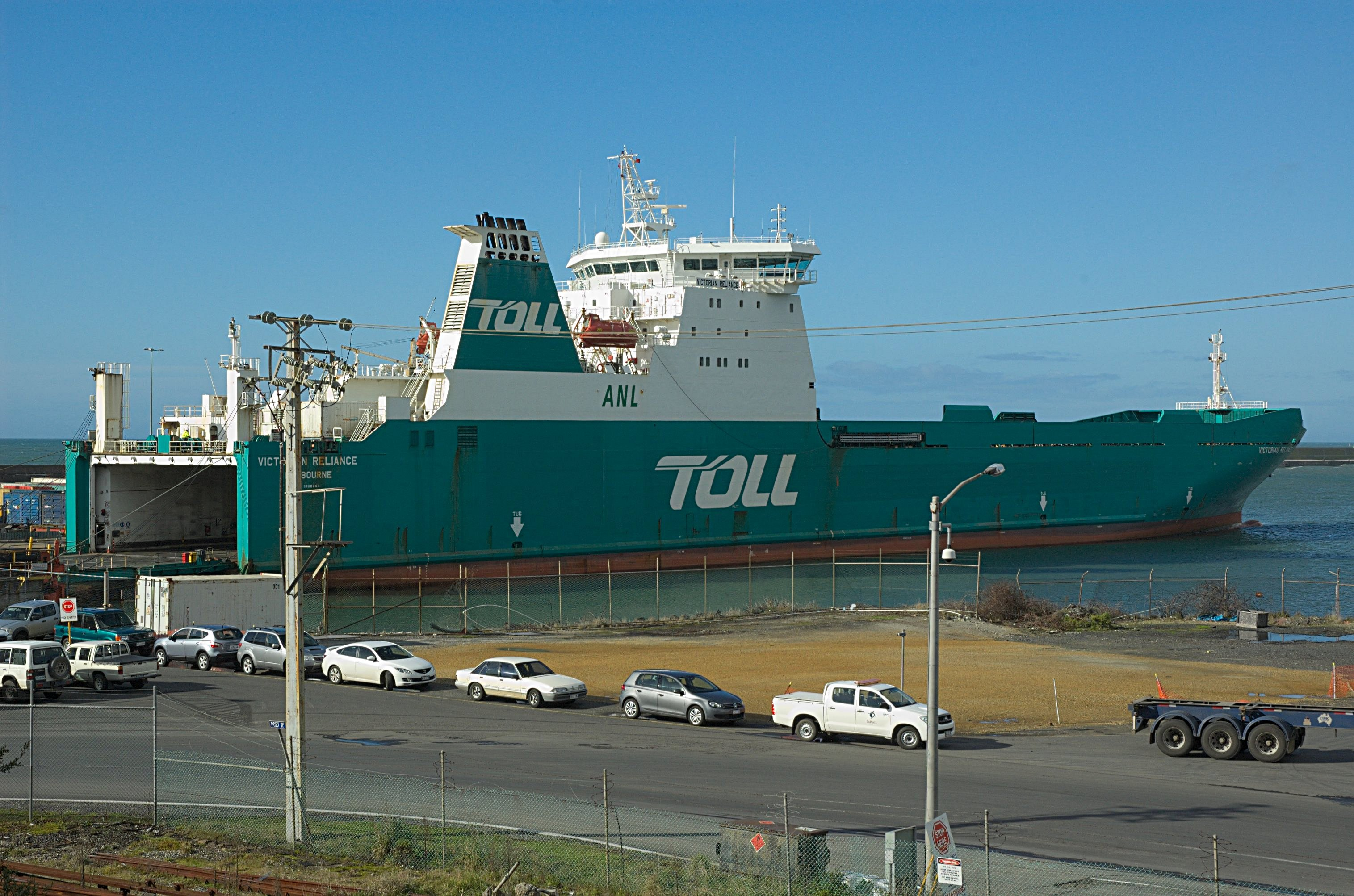
- Victorian Reliance at Burnie in 2012

History
- Name: Jolly Blue
- Owner: Messina Line
- Operator: Brambles Shipping (1999–2002); Toll Shipping (2002–2019); Messina Line (2019–current)
- Port of registry: Madeira (Portugal)
- Builder: Samsung Heavy Industries, Geoje, South Korea
- Launched: 31 December 1998
- Completed: 20 May 1999
- In service: 1999
- Renamed: Victorian Reliance (1999–2019); Jolly Blue (2019–)
- Identification: IMO number: 9180205; MMSI number: 503086000; Call sign: CQIS6

General characteristics
- Type: Container and Roll-on/roll-off
- Tonnage: 20,343 GT, 11,000 DWT
- Length: 192 m (629 ft 11 in)
- Beam: 23.64 m (77 ft 7 in)
- Draught: 6.34 m (20 ft 10 in)
- Installed power: 14,720 kW (19,740 hp) at 750 rpm
- Propulsion: 4 × Wärtsilä 8L32
- Speed: 20.5 knots (38.0 km/h; 23.6 mph)
- Capacity: 592 TEU, 2,524 lane metres

Jolly Blue is a cargo ship operated by Messina Line between Tunis, Gioia Tauro, and Naples. It was previously operated by Toll Shipping and Brambles Shipping in Australia as Victorian Reliance.

== History ==
The Jolly Blue was built by Samsung Heavy Industries as the Victorian Reliance for Brambles Shipping for use on Bass Strait services between Melbourne and Burnie, along with sister ship Tasmanian Achiever. The ship was acquired by Toll Shipping with the Brambles shipping business in 2002.

It was extended by 32 metres to 184 metres in Singapore in 2004. When CMA CGM, parent company of Australian National Line, withdrew the Bass Trader from the Melbourne to Bell Bay route in 2009, it entered into a joint venture to transfer cargo to the Toll ships. As such it carried both Toll and ANL logos.

In March 2019, it was replaced by the larger Victorian Reliance II. It briefly returned to service while repairs were performed on Victorian Reliance II. It was sold in 2020 to Messina Line, renamed Jolly Blue and began operating on the Mediterranean Sea between Tunis, Gioia, Tauro and Naples.
