= Sea Highway =

Shipping route across the Bass Strait

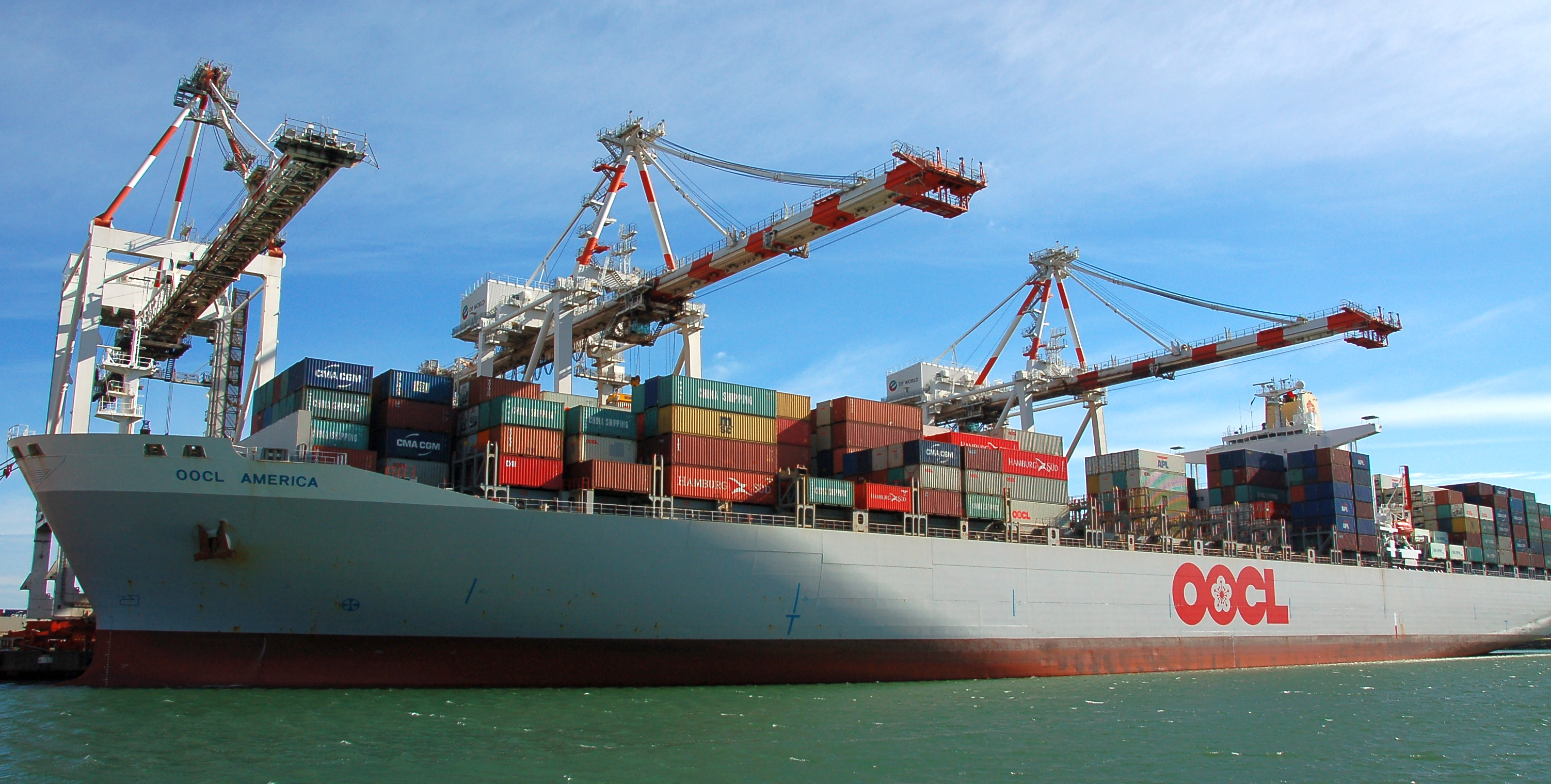
A container ship in the Port of Melbourne

The Sea Highway is an Australian colloquialism and figurative shipping route used to describe the sea lines of communication between the state of Victoria on the Australian mainland and island state of Tasmania across the Bass Strait.

Since the mid-1970s, there have been measures taken by the Australian Government to formalise and integrate the Sea Highway into the nation's National Highway network as a means to ensure equal transport opportunities and economic integration across the entire country.

== Background ==
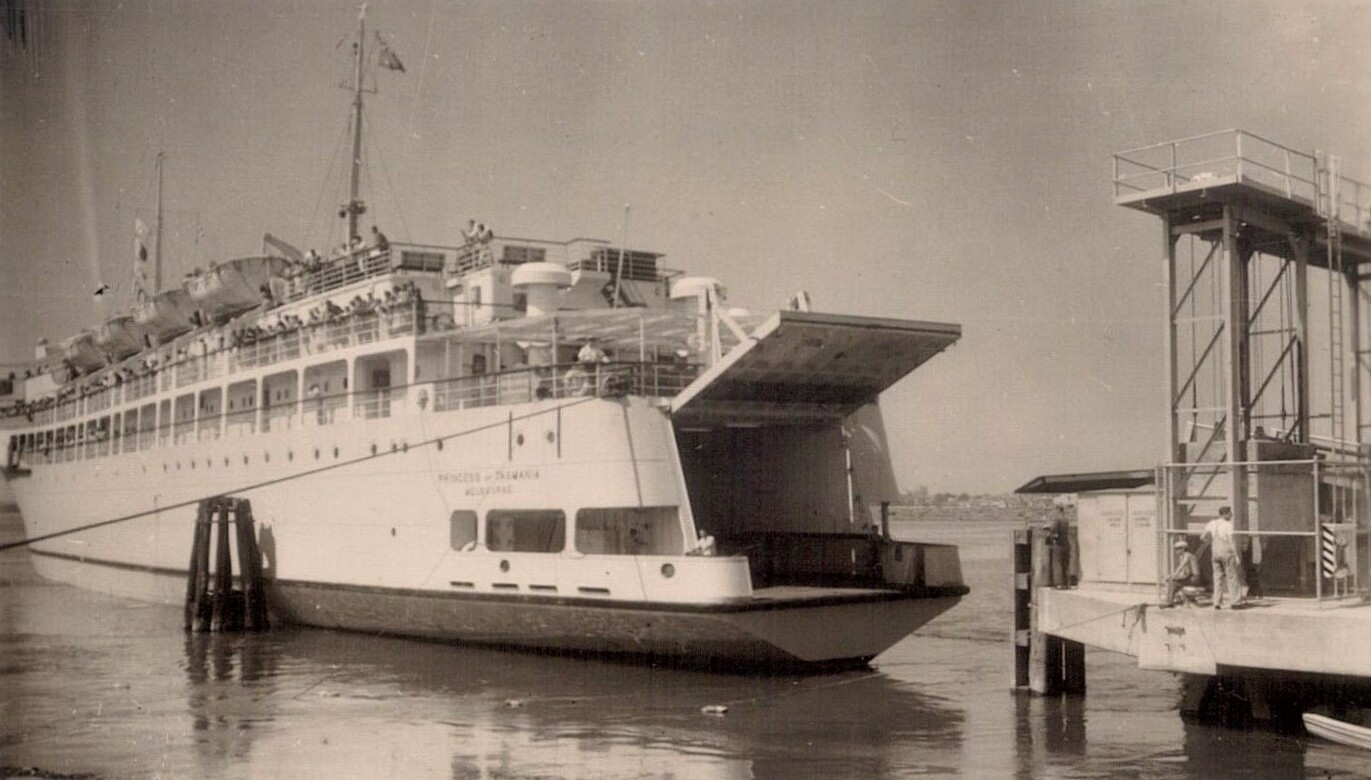
The Princess of Tasmania in 1958

As an island, Tasmania heavily relies on maritime trade to sustain its communities and economy, with a dependency on interstate shipping that is two and a half times greater than any other Australian state.

Before federation, the Colony of Tasmania depended on intercolonial tariffs for revenue. However, post-federation, only the Commonwealth could impose tariffs, and only on overseas goods. During the 1898 referendum, Tasmania's Premier, Edward Braddon, fought to ensure continued tariff revenue for the colony. The referendum failed in the Colony of New South Wales, leading to a 'secret' Premiers' conference where amendments were agreed upon. These amendments, known as the "Braddon Clause," became Section 87 of the Constitution of Australia, enabling the return of revenue from customs and excise to the states.

The term "Sea Highway" was being used colloquially to describe the merchant shipping route by the early 20th century. The premise of the "Sea Highway" became popularised following the advent of the Princess of Tasmania ferry services departing the Port of Melbourne. The Princess of Tasmania was the largest roll-on/roll-off passenger ship in the Southern Hemisphere at its launch in the 1950s and greatly enhanced Tasmania's popularity as a tourism destination.

With over 99% of Tasmania's freight by volume moved by sea, the federal government introduced the Tasmanian Freight Equalisation Scheme in 1976 to assist subsiding shipping costs. The Bass Strait Passenger Vehicle Equalisation Scheme was implemented in 1996 to further subsidise passenger shipping costs.

== National Highway subsidy rationale ==
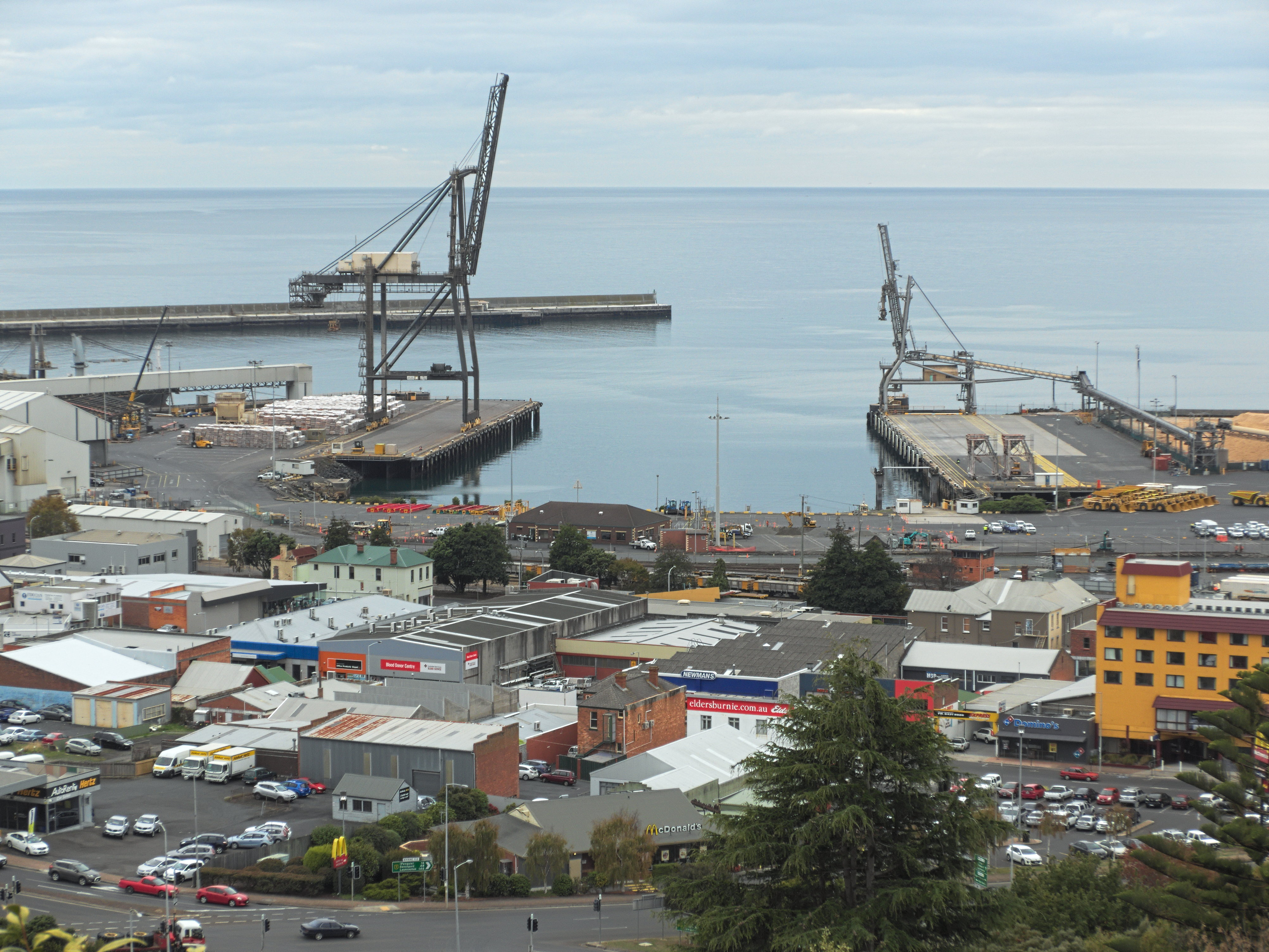
Port of Burnie in 2008

Shipping goods to and from Tasmania involves additional costs compared to road or rail transport on the mainland. These costs include fuel, freight charges, and the need for specialised transport infrastructure like sea ports and ferries. Additionally, Tasmania's smaller population and economy mean there is less demand for goods and services compared to larger states. This lower demand can lead to higher per-unit costs for goods and services due to less bulk purchasing and production.

As Australia's National Highway System is federally funded, except for the sea route to Tasmania, advocates for the Sea Highway seek for its formal recognition as part of the National Highway based on transport equity, aiming to enhance sea connections between Tasmania and mainland Australia. Similar to land highways that connect Australian regions, such as the Eyre Highway or Hume Highway, the Sea Highway requires considerable federal support to provide reliable, affordable services crucial for Tasmania's economic activities and smooth Bass Strait transportation.

== Sea Highway operators ==
The Sea Highway is routinely traversed by several shipping and ferry companies that provide vital transport and logistics services to Tasmania and its Bass Strait islands. Major Tasmanian ports include Devonport, Burnie, Bell Bay and Launceston. These shipping companies play a primary role in Tasmania’s economy, handling both passenger and freight services, supporting industries such as agriculture, retail, and manufacturing, while also maintaining the flow of essential goods and services. These companies collectively ensure connectivity between Tasmania and the Australian mainland.

=== Spirit of Tasmania ===
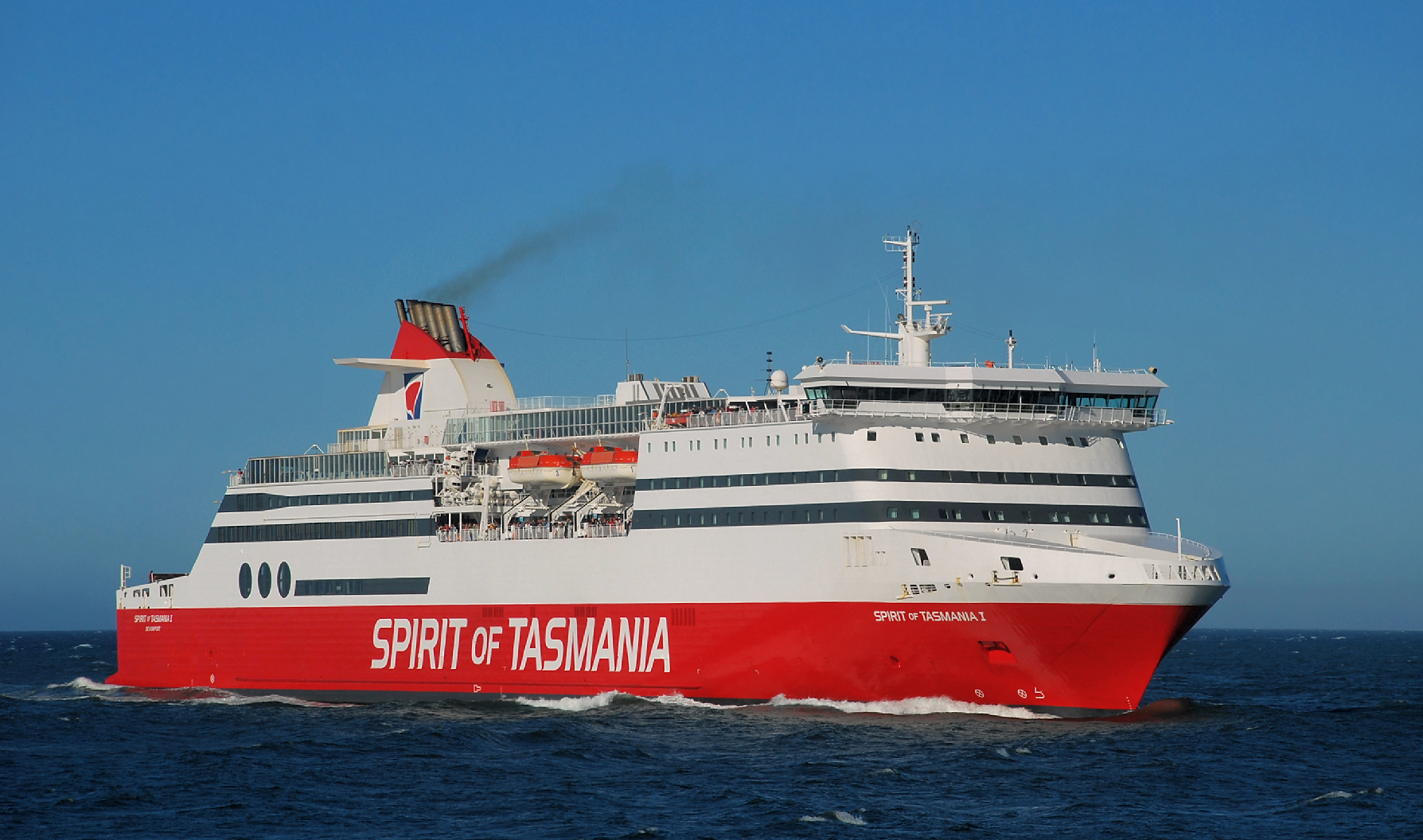
Spirit of Tasmania I in December 2007

Spirit of Tasmania ferries MVs Spirit of Tasmania I and Spirit of Tasmania II, operate between Geelong, Victoria and Devonport, Tasmania. The vessels also transport freight, including commercial vehicles, trailers, and other large cargo.

=== SeaRoad ===
SeaRoad specialises in freight services across the Bass Strait. SeaRoad ships cargo between Melbourne and Devonport, including a variety of goods such as containers, heavy machinery, and refrigerated cargo on Searoad Mersey II and Liekut, both modern roll-on/roll-off vessels.

=== Strait Link ===
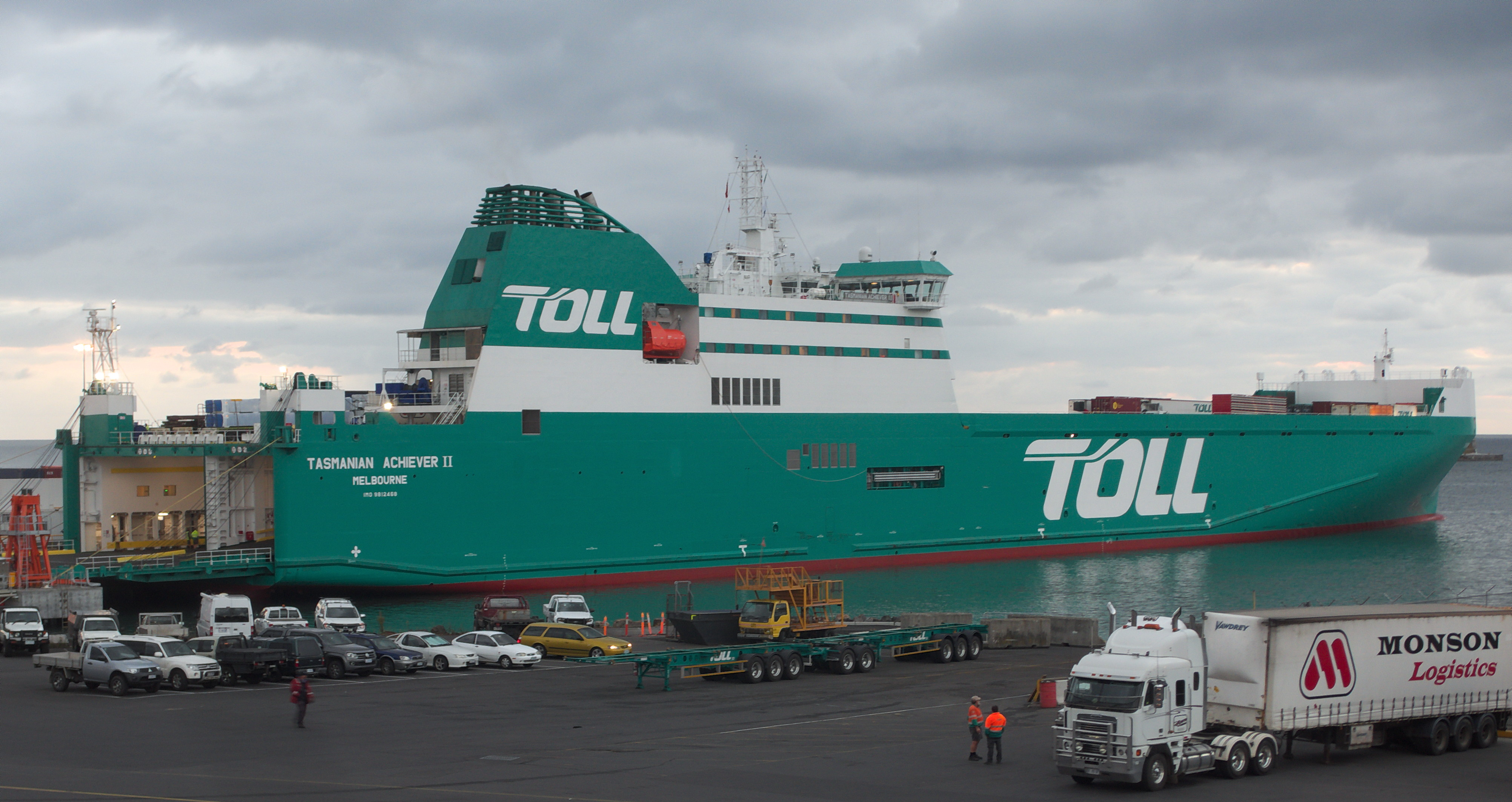
Tasmanian Achiever II in March 2019

Formally part of Toll Group, Strait Link provides extensive freight services with regular sailings between Melbourne and Burnie. Toll's vessels cater to a wide range of industries, including retail, agriculture, and manufacturing. Toll operates several specialised ships, including flagship Tasmanian Achiever II and Victorian Reliance II, which are among the largest RoRo vessels in Australia.

=== Bass Island Line ===
Operated by TasPorts, Bass Island Line (BIL) focuses on freight services, particularly between King Island and mainland Australia. Bass Island Line provides an essential service to the King Island community, shipping goods such as livestock, agricultural products, and general cargo. BIL currently operates the John Duigan, a multi-purpose vessel suited for both general and refrigerated cargo.

=== Swire Shipping ===
Swire Shipping is involved in international shipping, offering containerised cargo services across the Bass Strait. Although not primarily a domestic operator, Swire Shipping connects Tasmania to international markets, with services linking Melbourne, Tasmania and beyond.

== Sources ==
- "Call made for Tasmanian sea highway". Australasian Business Intelligence. Comtex. 12 February 2008. ISSN 1320-6680.
- "Sea highway lobby steps up campaign". Australasian Business Intelligence. Comtex: 1008232i5704. 20 August 2001. ISSN 1320-6680.
- BTE Monitoring Report Number 3 – 1998/99 (PDF) (Report). Bureau of Infrastructure & Transport Research Economics. 1 April 2000. Archived from the original (PDF) on 30 June 2024.
- National Sea Highway Committee (30 June 1999), Tasmanian State Government has an unprecedented opportunity to cost a national highway connection to Tasmania
- Plowman, Peter (2004). Ferry to Tasmania: A Short History. Dural: Rosenberg Publishing. ISBN 1-877058-27-0.
