= Jolly Express =

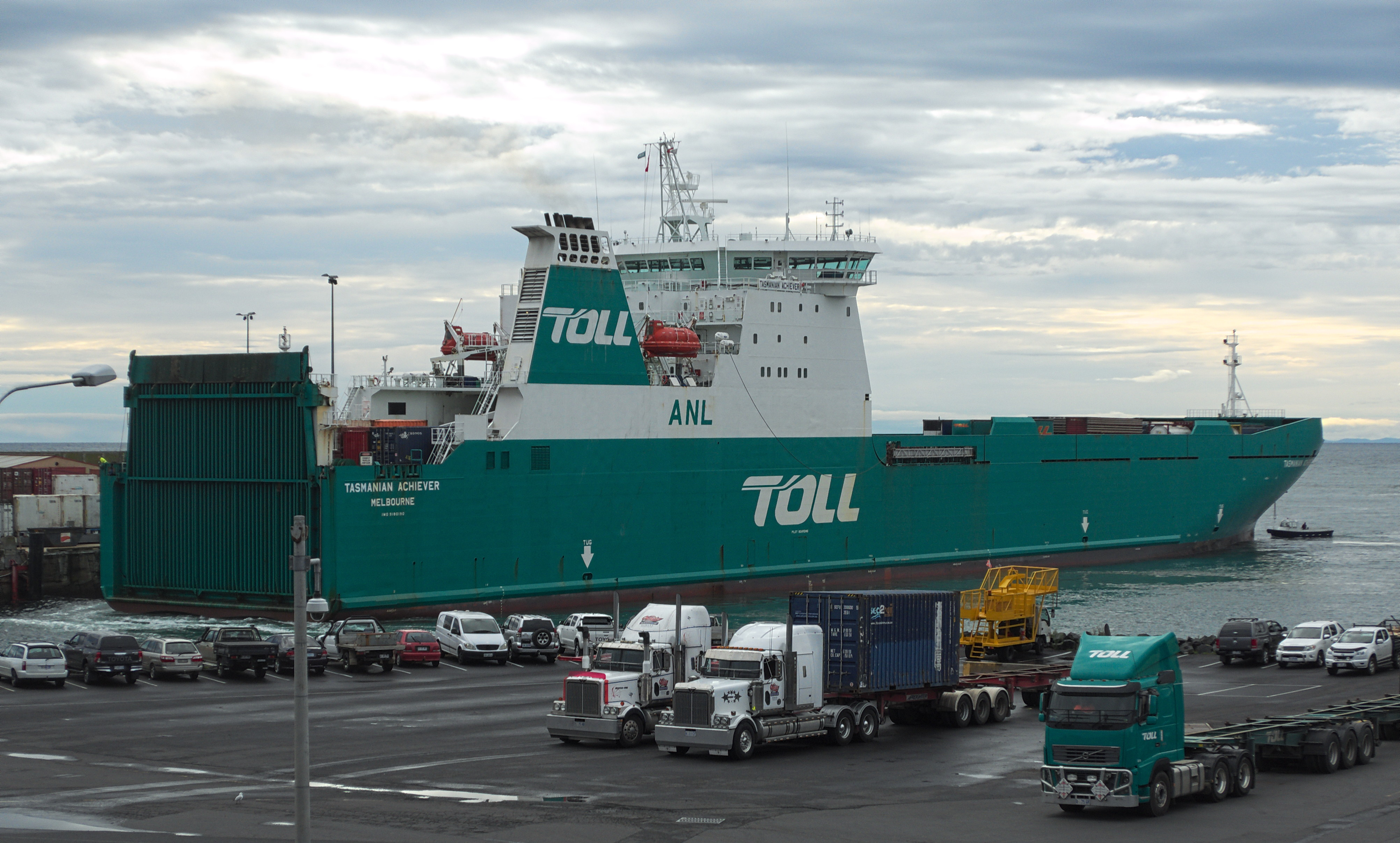
- Tasmanian Achiever in Burnie in 2017

History
- Name: Jolly Express
- Owner: Mediterranean Shipping Company
- Operator: Brambles Shipping (1999–2002); Toll Shipping (2002-2019); Messina Line (2019-)
- Port of registry: Madeira (Portugal)
- Builder: Samsung Heavy Industries, Geoje, South Korea
- Yard number: 1249
- In service: 1999
- Renamed: Tasmanian Achiever (1999–2019); Jolly Express (2019-)
- Identification: IMO number: 9180190; MMSI number: 503087000; Call sign: CQAT4

General characteristics
- Type: Container and Roll-on/roll-off
- Tonnage: 20,343 GT, 11,000 DWT
- Length: 183 m (600 ft 5 in)
- Beam: 22 m (72 ft 2 in)
- Draught: 6.35 m (20 ft 10 in)
- Installed power: 14,720 kW (19,740 hp) at 750 rpm
- Propulsion: 4 x Wärtsilä 8L32
- Speed: 20.5 knots (38.0 km/h; 23.6 mph)
- Capacity: 592 TEU, 2,524 lane-metres

Jolly Express is a cargo ship operated by Messina Line between Tunis, Naples, and Genoa. It was previously operated by Toll Shipping and Brambles Shipping in Australia as the Tasmanian Achiever.

== History ==
The Jolly Express was built by Samsung Heavy Industries as the Tasmanian Achiever for Brambles Shipping for use on Bass Strait services between Melbourne and Burnie, along with sister ship Victorian Reliance. The ship was acquired by Toll Shipping with the Brambles shipping business in 2002.

It was extended by 32 metres to 184 metres in Singapore in 2004. When CMA CGM, parent company of Australian National Line, withdrew the Bass Trader from the Melbourne to Bell Bay route in 2009, it entered into a joint venture to transfer cargo to the Toll ships. As such it carried both Toll and ANL logos.

In March 2019 it was replaced by the larger Tasmanian Achiever II. It was sold to Messina Line, renamed Jolly Express and began operating on the Mediterranean Sea between Tunis, Naples and Genoa.
