= Toll Resources & Government Logistics =

- Industry: Logistics
- Headquarters: Melbourne, Australia
- Area served: Australia; Asia; Africa
- Services: Integrated Service Provider
- Revenue: A$1.122.7 billion (2014)
- Net income: A$102.7 million (2014)
- Number of employees: 3,150 (2014)
- Parent: Toll Group
- Divisions: Toll Offshore Petroleum Services; Toll Marine Logistics; Toll Energy; Toll Mining Services; Toll Remote Logistics; Toll Liquids; Toll Transitions
- Website: www.tollgroup.com

Toll Resources & Government Logistics (TRGL) is a division of the Toll Group. Predominantly, the division offers integrated logistics solutions to the oil and gas, mining, chemicals and coal industries in over 10 countries.

== Divisions ==
Toll Offshore Petroleum Services is the owner-operator of offshore supply bases at Loyang in Singapore, Sihanoukville in Cambodia and Sattahip in Thailand. Toll Offshore Petroleum Services supports oil and gas development activities in the Asia–Pacific region, ranging from Australia to the Caspian Sea region.

Toll Marine Logistics (Australia) services include remote area stevedoring, shipping and marine logistics linking northern Australia to the Asia–Pacific region. It also provides integrated supply chain management, including intermodal services. It employs about 300 people. Toll Marine Logistics (Asia) services include bulk handling and transportation of coal, steel scrap, billets, sand and aggregates. Its service extends to ASEAN entities (except Laos and Brunei). Toll Energy is a provider of logistics services to the Australian oil and gas production industry. It has a network of supply bases located on the North West Shelf, Timor Sea, Bass Strait, Adelaide, Browse Basin, Cooper Basin, Brisbane, Singapore, Cambodia and Thailand.

Toll Mining Services provides supply chain services. They specialise in inbound and outbound dangerous goods and chemical logistics for the coal mining industries. Its services include bulk haulage of commodities; on-and-off haulage services; transport of specialised bulk such as security-sensitive ammonium nitrate; logistics for explosives; and inbound industrial chemical logistics.

Toll Remote Logistics provides services to military, naval and peacekeeping forces, entities within the mining sector and other commercial and not-for-profit organisations situated in remote locations. Toll Liquids specialises in transporting bulk liquids and industrial gases by road for both dangerous goods and non-dangerous goods, including food. Toll Transitions provides removal and relocation services to about 300 Australian organisations and government departments. On average, Toll Transitions manages about 30,000 relocations each year.

== Services ==
The $325 million upgrade of the Toll Offshore Petroleum Services facility in Loyang, Singapore, means that the firm owns one of the world's three major oil and gas hubs. The facility has a length of 1,000 metres and a water depth of 8.5 metres. It has a multi-storey ramp-up warehouse. Toll Mining Services has security-sensitive ammonium nitrate storage facilities.

As of June 2012, Toll Marine Logistics (Australia) had a fleet of 10 vessels including landing craft and container vessels. Toll Marine Logistics (Asia) had a fleet of over 80 vessels including tugs, dumb, self-propelled and discharging barges; landing craft; floating cranes; a floating terminal and a floating workshop and maintenance facility; and container vessels. Toll Marine Logistics operates six terminals in Australia and two facilities in Singapore and Indonesia. Toll Mining Services has a fleet that can take payload tasks of up to 360 tonnes.

On average, Toll Transitions manages about 30,000 relocations each year. In July 2010, Toll Transitions commenced its contract with the Australian Defence Force to provide removal and relocation services, which was reported to be more than $1 billion for the first five years. The Minister indicated in January 2012 that Defence usually relocates around 23,000 members and their families each year as part of the military posting cycle.

In April 2014, Toll Energy announced that they would be constructing and operating a base in Darwin to support INPEX's liquefied natural gas offshore facilities in Ichthys Field in the Browse Basin.

== See also ==
- Toll Group
- Toll Domestic Forwarding
