= New Zealand Railways =

New Zealand Railways may refer to KiwiRail which is the current rail services owner/operator and infrastructure owner/maintainer.

New Zealand Railways may also refer to the following companies:

- New Zealand Railways Department (also known as New Zealand Government Railways) – New Zealand national rail owner/operator until 1982
- New Zealand Railways Corporation – New Zealand national rail owner/operator (1982–1990), railway landowner (1990–2003), rail network owner trading as ONTRACK (2003–2008), railway landowner (2008–present)
- New Zealand Rail Limited – national rail owner/operator (1990–1995; privatised 1993)
- Tranz Rail – national rail owner/operator (1995–2003)
- Toll Rail, a division of Toll NZ – rail services operator (2003–2008)
- KiwiRail – national rail owner/operator (2008–present)

== See also ==
- Rail transport in New Zealand
