= CHEP =

Australian pallet and container company

- Industry: Equipment pooling
- Founded: 1946
- Founder: Government of Australia
- Headquarters: Sydney, Australia
- Products: Automotive containers Chemical catalyst containers Intermediate bulk containers Pallets; Returnable plastic containers
- Owner: Brambles Limited
- Website: chep.com

CHEP (Commonwealth Handling Equipment Pool) is an Australian company dealing in pallet and container pooling services, serving customers in a range of industrial and retail supply chains. It is a subsidiary of Brambles.

CHEP offers wooden and plastic pallets, small display pallets, crates and IBC containers. These products can generally be recognised by their blue color and CHEP logo.

== History ==
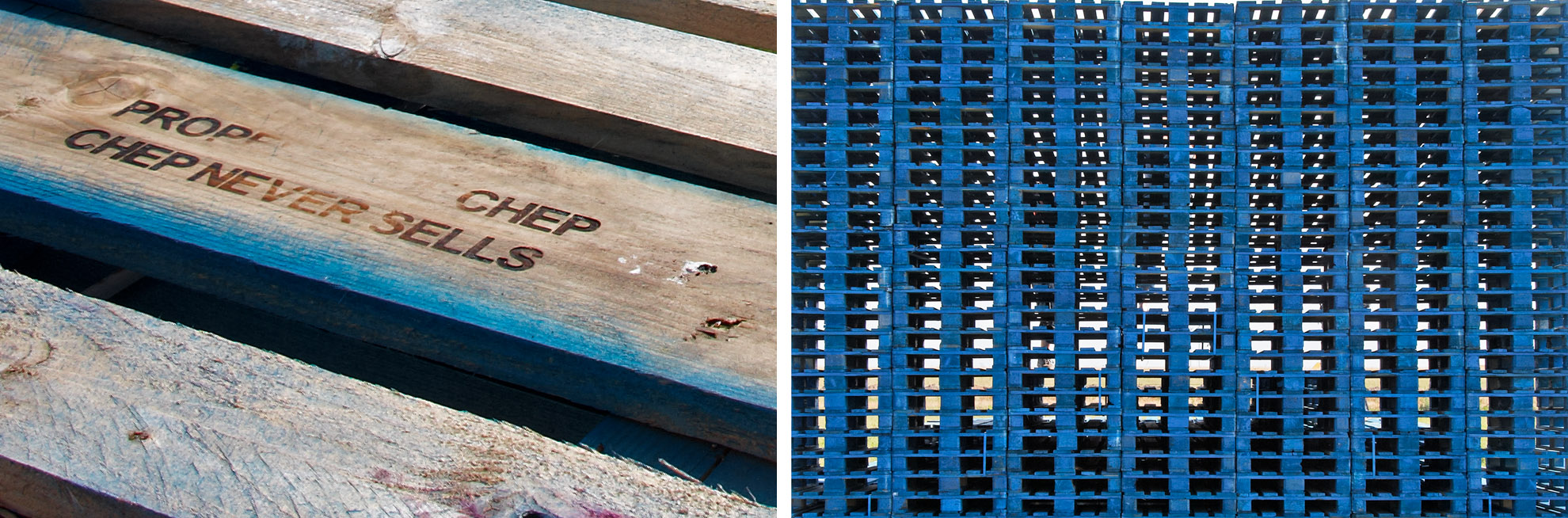
Chep pallets

CHEP evolved from the Allied Materials Handling Standing Committee, an organisation developed by the Australian Government to provide efficient handling of defence supplies during World War II.

When the war ended in 1945, the United States Army returned home, leaving behind at least 60,000 wooden pallets at its military bases in Australia. With this asset base and established infrastructure, the Australian Government continued to endorse the organisation after the war to support the national economy. In 1958, CHEP was sold to Brambles.

Brambles operates primarily through the CHEP brand across approximately 60 countries and manages a pool of approximately 348 million pallets, crates and containers through a network of more than 750 service centres.

In 2014, Radio National reported that CHEP's dominance of pallet hire and supply had become a challenge to "pallet recyclers in America, where approximately twelve to fifteen percent of all lumber produced is used in its own pallet manufacturing."
