= Dora Birtles =

Australian writer

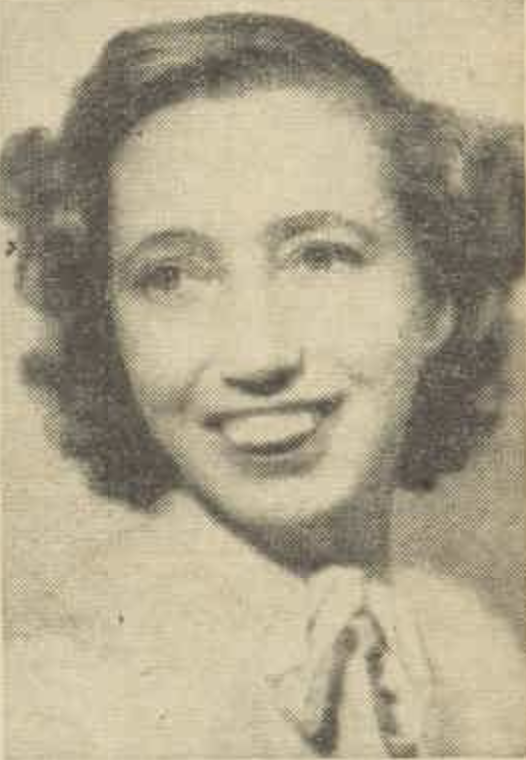
- Dora Birtles, c.1946
- Born: Dora Eileen Toll; 2 April 1903; Wickham, New South Wales, Australia
- Died: 27 January 1992 (aged 88); Cobar, New South Wales, Australia
- Education: University of Sydney
- Occupations: novelist, short-story writer, poet and travel writer
- Partner: Bert Birtles
- Children: 2 sons

Dora Birtles (née Toll; 1904–1992), was an Australian novelist, short-story writer, poet and travel writer.

== Life ==
Dora Toll was born in 1903 in Wickham, New South Wales, a suburb of Newcastle, the sixth daughter of Albert Frederick Toll and Hannah (née Roberts). She was ahead of her time in studying at the University of Sydney in a period when few women received a tertiary education. However, she was suspended in 1923 for a poem appearing in the literary magazine Hermes, which describes post-coital bliss. Her future husband, poet and journalist Bert Birtles, was expelled for a still more explicit poem in the same issue of Hermes describing their tryst on the roof of the university quadrangle.

Dora Birtles returned to Sydney University to take a degree in Oriental history and a diploma of education, and then taught in Newcastle, New South Wales for a short time before travelling to Europe. Before the Second World War, she was a member of the International Women's League Against War and Fascism and reported for the Newcastle Sun.

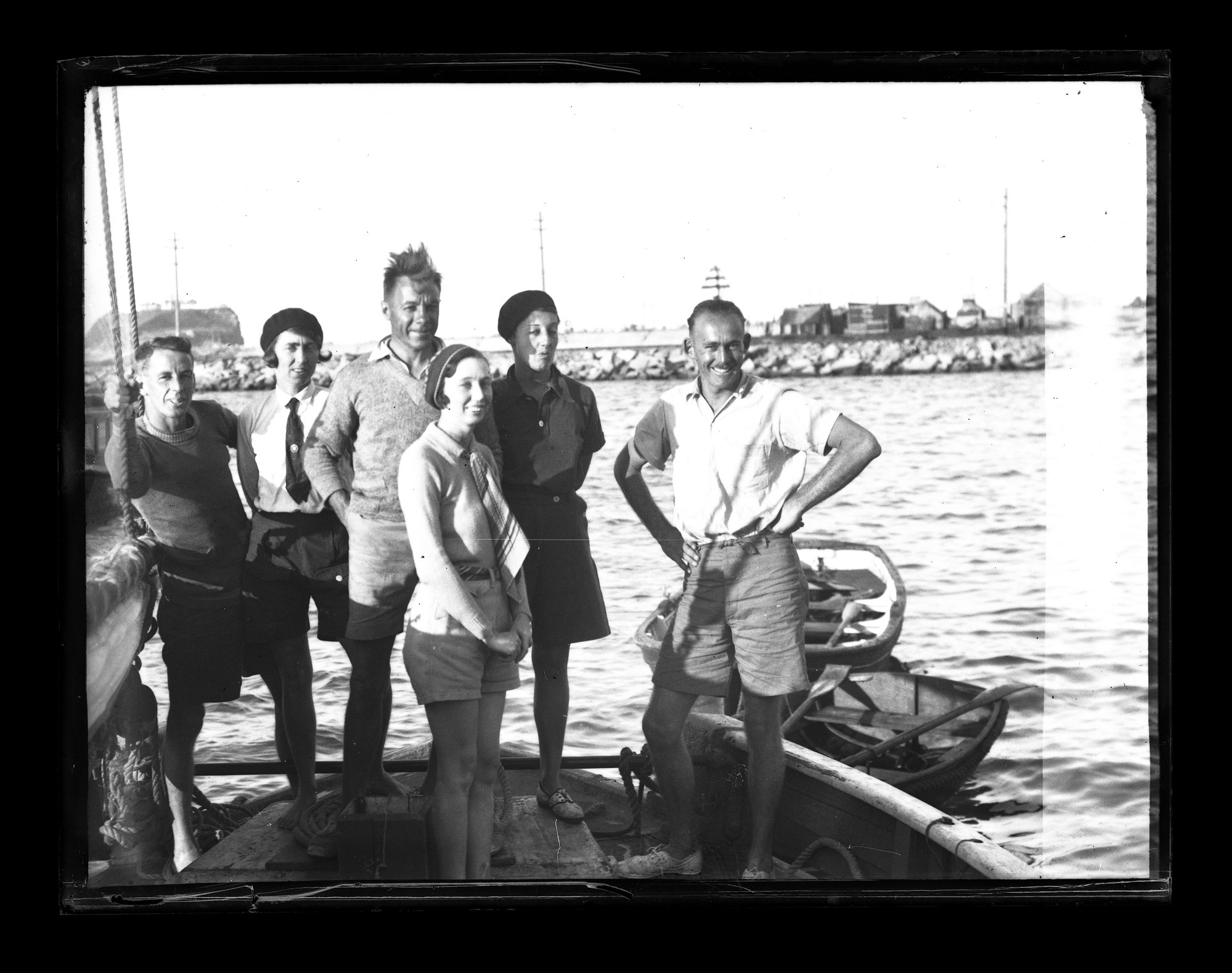
Crew of the "Gullmarn", King's Wharf, Newcastle, NSW, 29 April 1932. From left to right - Hedley Metcalf (captain), Miss Saxby, Mr. Nicholson (navigator), Mrs. Bert Birtles, Mrs. Metcalf and Mr. Moore.

Birtles was the subject of a finalist portrait for the Archibald Prize of 1947, by Dora Toovey.

Dora Birtles died in Cobar, New South Wales, on 27 January 1992 aged 88.

== Works ==
Birtles' first novel, Pioneer Shack was for children. It had been written in the 1930s but did not appear until 1947, after the publication of a novel for adults, The Overlanders (1946), which was based on the 1946 film of the same name for which she had been a researcher. Birtles wrote an account of a sea voyage from Newcastle to Singapore, North-West by North (1935) which became one of her most popular works. She also wrote another children's novel, Bonza the Bull (1949). Her work has been the subject of feminist literary criticism.

== Bibliography ==
- North-West by North (1935)
- The Overlanders (1946)
- Australia in Colour (1947)
- Bonza the Bull (1949)

== Works on Dora Birtles ==
- Moore, Deirdre (1996) Survivors of Beauty: memoirs of Dora and Bert Birtles (Croydon, NSW : Book Collectors' Society of Australia).
- Birtles, Bert (1938) Exiles in the Aegean (London: Victor Gollancz). Experiences in pre-war Greece.
