= Webb Dock railway line =

Railway line in Melbourne, Australia

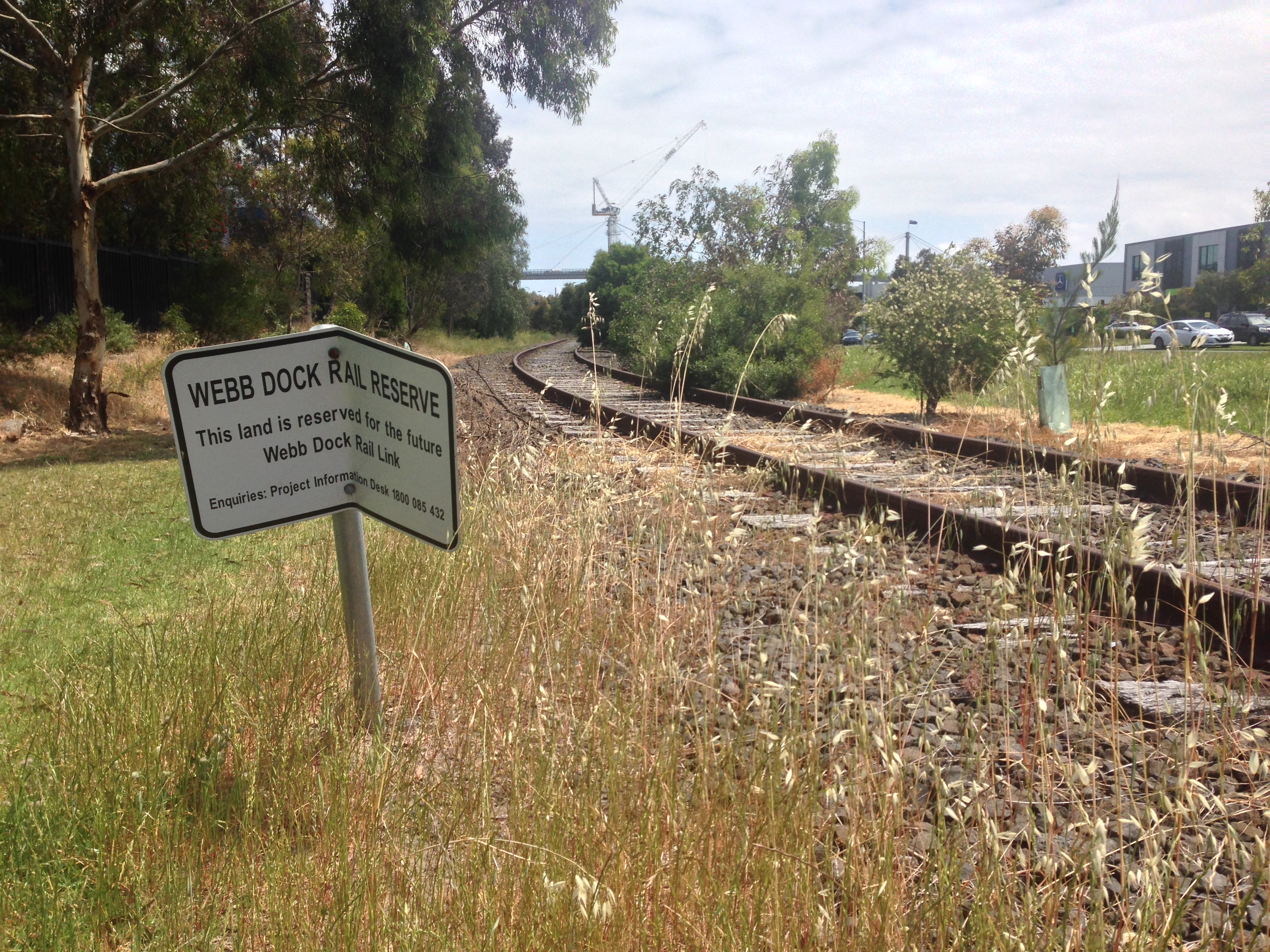

Overview
- Status: Closed
- Owner: V/Line
- Locale: Melbourne
- Termini: Spencer Street station; Webb Dock

Service
- Operator: V/Line

History
- Opened: 27 February 1986
- Closed: 14 June 1996

Technical
- Line length: 7.8 kilometres
- Track gauge: 1,600 mm (5 ft 3 in)

The Webb Dock railway line is a former railway line in Melbourne, Victoria, Australia.

== History ==
On 27 February 1986, the Webb Dock line was opened by Minister for Transport Tom Roper. It was built as a freight line to service the Webb Dock container port in Melbourne, with provision for the line to be converted to dual gauge. This attracted some controversy, as the line used 1,600 mm broad gauge, which was criticised by ANL, claiming that it was costing the shipping industry millions of dollars per year (ANL contributed to the building of the line, and used dual gauge within its area of the dock).

The first train to run on the line operated on Thursday 12 September 1985, worked by engine G514, hauling about 12-15 75 ft (23 m) flat wagons each loaded with two 20 ft (6.1 m) containers, and a CP van.

The line commenced near Spencer Street station, passing through what is now Docklands Stadium, before crossing the Yarra River via a bridge and then running west, parallel to Lorimer Street. It turned south at Todd Road, before turning west, parallel to Wharf Road, and beneath the West Gate Bridge, to Webb Dock. The line passed through thirteen level crossings, about half fitted with flashing lights and the rest with hand gates on one the port side of the line. Only one signal, dwarf H, was provided to allow trains from Webb Dock to cross the combined intersection of Johnson Street North, Footscray Road and Piggott Street, and enter the Melbourne Yard area. Based on the alignment of Piggott Street, the Webb Dock line appears to have cut directly through the former West Melbourne Gasworks plant. The alignment may have clipped the north-east corner of the former Gasworks coal shed site, but it was on a different bearing, slightly more anticlockwise, to the 2 ft 6 in (762 mm) gauge elevated gasworks railway's central spine.

After being opened, the line spent months with few (if any) trains using it, reportedly due to a clerk's dispute and shunters strike. By July 1986, trains were running on a regular schedule most nights.

It was last used in 1992 and formally closed on 14 June 1996 as part of the construction of the Docklands Stadium. The bridge over the Yarra River was converted to a footbridge. Much of the line west of the Bolte Bridge remains in situ.

Earlier plans for the line included running it via the Port Melbourne beachfront. However, after opposition from local residents, the plans were dropped.

The Victorian Freight Plan calls for a freight link to Webb Dock.
