= Bass Strait Passenger Vehicle Equalisation Scheme =

Scheme between mainland Australia and Tasmania

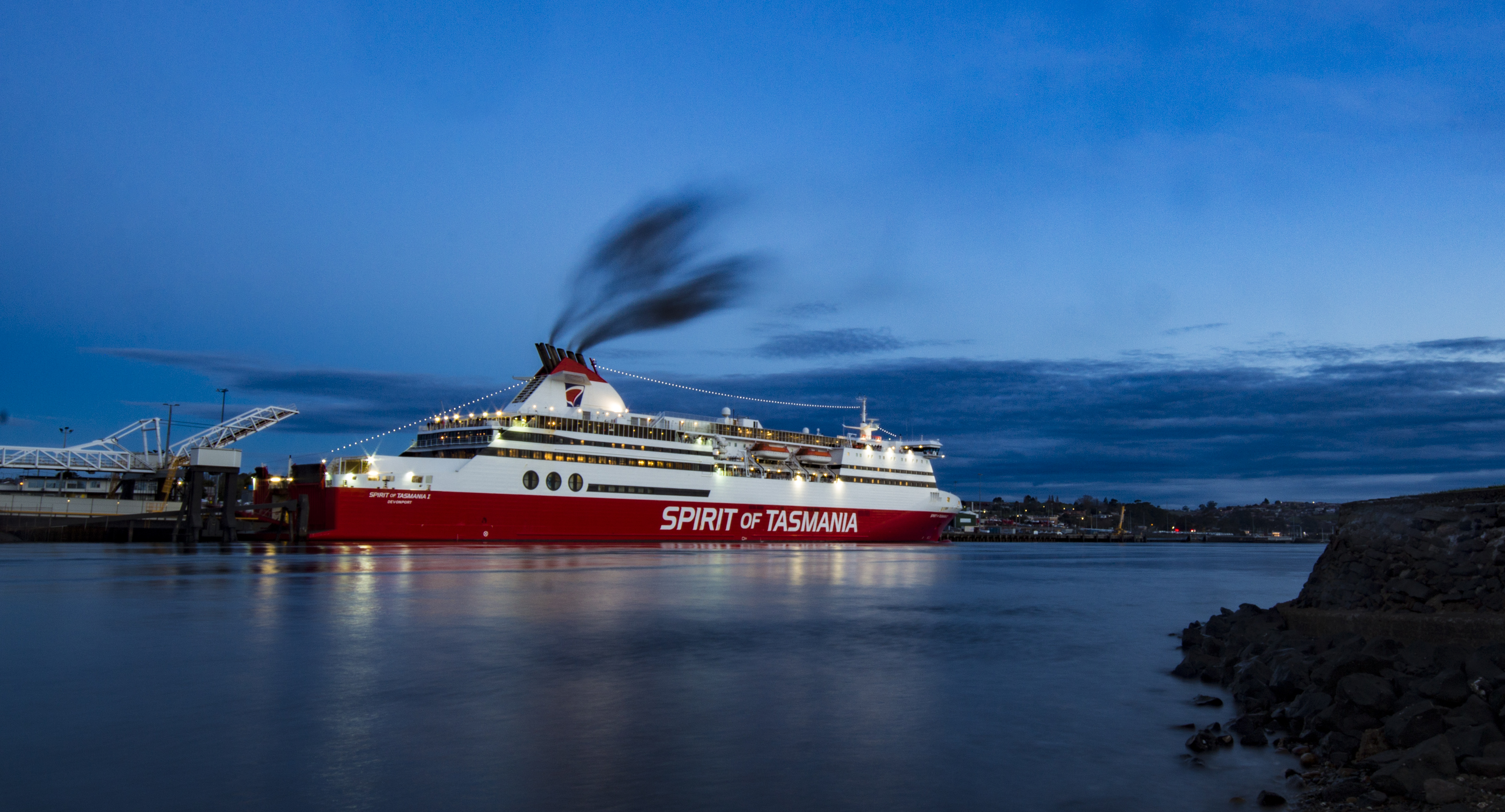
Spirit of Tasmania I berthed in Devonport, Tasmania

The Bass Strait Passenger Vehicle Equalisation Scheme (BSPVES) is an Australian Government initiative that offers uncapped federal funding to subsidise the cost of ferry travel across Bass Strait. This scheme primarily supports services operated by the Tasmanian Government owned Spirit of Tasmania, linking the Port of Geelong on the Australian mainland with the island state of Tasmania. The BSPVES also includes provisions for commuters who must fly between mainland Australia and King Island or the Furneaux Group due to the absence of ferry services.

In 2023/24, the BSPVES expended a total of $58.2 million covering 201,000 vehicle crossings.

== History ==
Introduced by the Commonwealth Minister for Transport and Regional Development in September 1996, the BSPVES aimed to bridge the gap in transport costs, making sea travel as equitable as road travel. The scheme's implementation is seen as the first step in formalising the Sea Highway, a figurative highway linking Tasmania to the Australian mainland's National Highway.

The Bureau of Infrastructure & Transport Research Economics released its third monitoring report in April 2000, which evaluated the scheme's impact for the 1998/99 period. The report noted that the scheme significantly increased demand for sea travel, resulting in a 12% rise in vehicle numbers and a 9.3% increase in total passenger numbers for Spirit of Tasmania, the primary ferry operator.

As a result of the Australian Government temporarily increasing the BSPVES, passengers on the Spirit of Tasmania ferry between Melbourne and Devonport were able to bring their vehicle at no extra charge from 1 March 2021 to 30 June 2021. The free vehicle fares also applied to motorbikes and bicycles, while caravans and camper vans received a discount equivalent to a standard vehicle fare. The initiative was part of the government's efforts to boost Tasmanian tourism, and encourage Tasmanians to travel interstate and stimulate the Australian economy post-COVID-19.

== Rebates ==
Administered by Services Australia on behalf of the Department of Infrastructure, Transport, Regional Development, Communications & the Arts, the scheme operates under Ministerial Directions. Rebates are calculated to match the cost of driving the equivalent distance by highway and are adjusted seasonally. Rebates are generally provided to drivers in the form of reduced fares charged by service operators. If the fare charged by the operator is below the applicable rebate, the rebate amount is capped at the fare charged.

== Scheme criticism ==
Over the years, the BSPVES has faced criticism for its inability to achieve its original transport equity aim fully.

Introduced to make the cost of sea travel across Bass Strait comparable to road travel on the mainland, the scheme has been criticised for primarily benefiting passenger vehicles while excluding other forms of transport, such as foot passengers and certain types of freight, including southbound consumables and international exports.

Critics have argued that the scheme’s focus has shifted toward promoting tourism, particularly by subsidising "driving holidays for mainlanders," rather than addressing broader economic and transport needs. Unlike mainland highways, the Sea Highway has not received equivalent funding, leading to concerns over its reliability and accessibility.

Additionally, reports have highlighted administrative inefficiencies and inconsistencies in the scheme’s implementation, which have compounded challenges in achieving equitable transport links and hindered Tasmania's economic integration with the mainland.

== Sources ==
- BTE Monitoring Report Number 3 – 1998/99 (PDF) (Report). Bureau of Infrastructure & Transport Research Economics. 1 April 2000. Archived from the original (PDF) on 30 June 2024.
- Monitoring Report (PDF) (Report). Vol. 18. Department of Infrastructure, Transport, Regional Development, Communications & the Arts. 1 October 2022. Archived from the original (PDF) on 13 August 2023.
