= Albert Toll =

Founder of an Australian delivery company and former mayor (1865–1960)

- Born: Albert Frederick Toll; 1865
- Died: 1960 (aged 94–95)
- Occupations: Transport and logistics provider, Politician
- Children: Dora Birtles

Albert Frederick Toll (1865–1960) was an English-born Australian businessman and politician who founded Australia and New Zealand's largest transport company, Toll Group (along with its subdivision, Toll NZ). He also served as mayor of Wickham, New South Wales.

He founded Toll in 1888, when he hauled coal with a horse and cart.

He was the father of Australian novelist Dora Birtles, and founding president of Lake Macquarie Yacht Club, Victor Toll. A street in the Lake Macquarie suburb Valentine, Albert Street, was named after him.

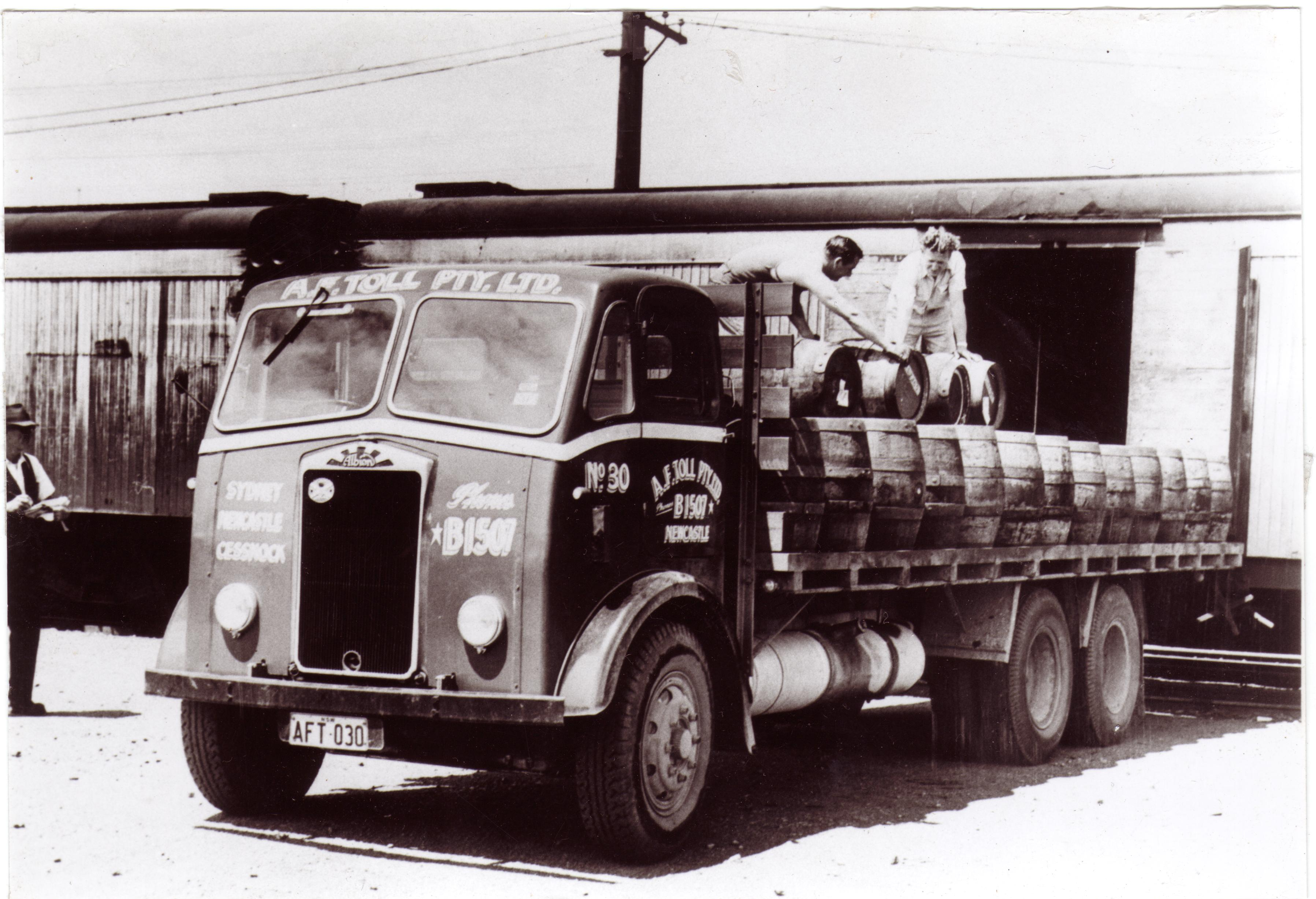
An A.F. Toll marked Albion vehicle, when the business operated out of Sydney, Newcastle and Cessnock

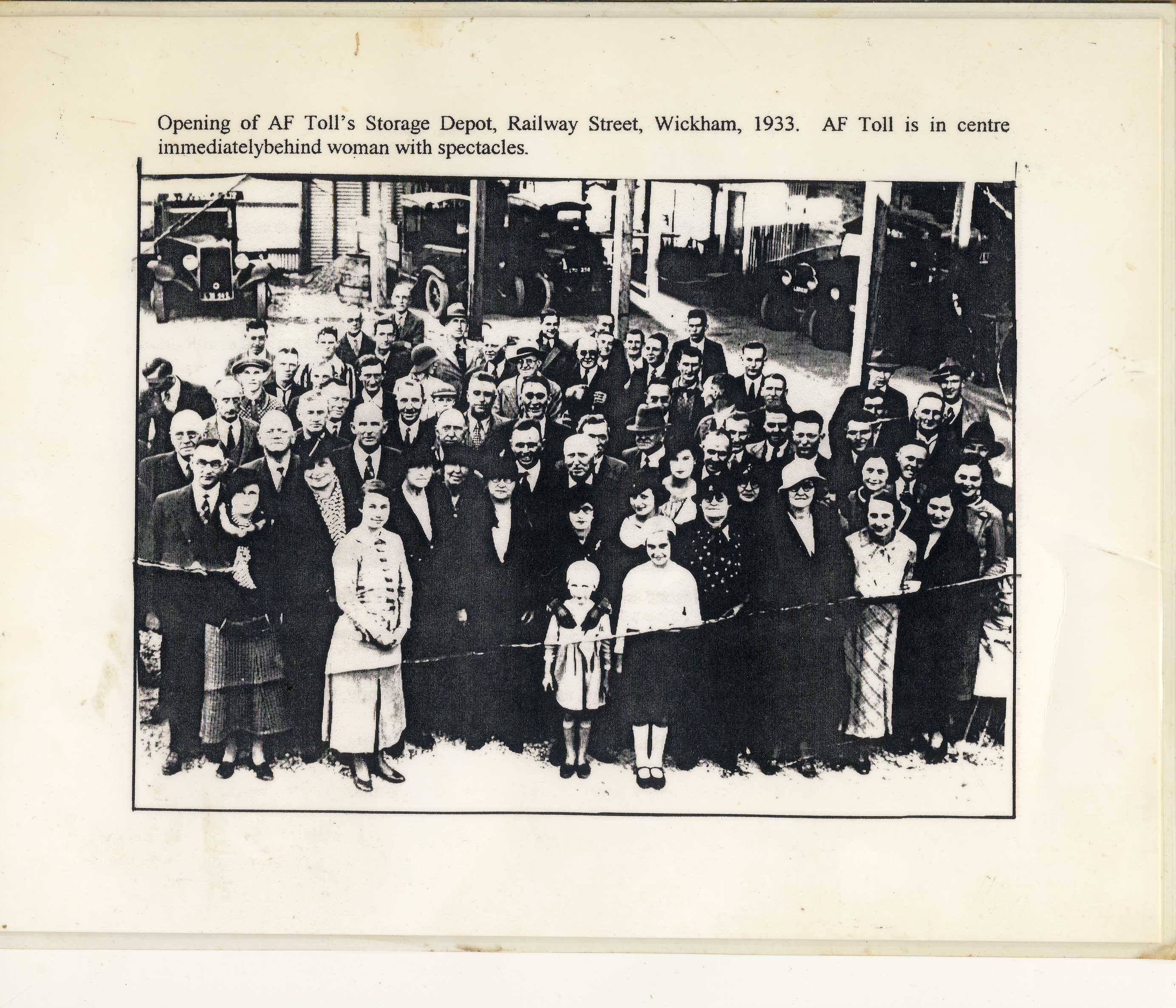
Opening of A.F. Toll's Storage Depot. 1933
