= Brambles Limited =

Australian company

- Type: Public
- Traded as: ASX: BXB formerly ASX: BIL
- Industry: Commercial & Professional Services
- Founded: 1875; 151 years ago
- Headquarters: Sydney, Australia
- Products: Pallets, reusable produce crates, containers
- Revenue: US$5.7 billion (2023)
- Operating income: US$1.072 billion (2023)
- Net income: US$703.3 million (2023)
- Number of employees: 12,000 (2023)
- Website: www.brambles.com

Brambles Limited is an Australian company that specialises in the pooling of unit-load equipment, pallets, crates and containers. It is listed on the Australian Securities Exchange.

== History ==
Brambles traces its history to 1875, when Walter Bramble established a butchery business in Newcastle, the operations of which he gradually expanded into transport and logistics. Brambles was listed on the Australian Securities Exchange in 1954, as W E Bramble & Sons Limited and entered the pallet pooling business in 1958 through the purchase of the Commonwealth Handling Equipment Pool (CHEP), from the Australian Government. This same year the company changed its name to Brambles Industries Limited and moved its head office from Newcastle to Sydney.

In 1970, Brambles entered the waste disposal market with the purchase of the Australian subsidiary of Purle Brothers Holdings. In 1972, Brambles entered the armoured car market in partnership with Brink's. In 1972, Brambles purchased the Port Jackson & Manly Steamship Company. Brambles main interest in the business, was a 50% shareholding in Tidewater Port Jackson Marine, which operated six platform supply vessels. Following a threat by Brambles to withdraw the loss-making Manly ferry service, the Public Transport Commission took over the service in December 1974. In 1975, Brambles formed an 80:20 joint venture with UK company Guest Keen & Nettlefold (GKN) to bring CHEP to the United Kingdom.

In July 1984, Grace Removals was purchased. In 1988, Brambles became the largest private rail wagon operator in Europe acquiring Groupe CAIB of Brussels and Procor's United Kingdom business. In December 1989 equipment hire business Wreckair was purchased.

In 1990 Brambles acquired Econofrieght a Thornaby based heavy haulage company, which was one of the biggest heavy haulage companies. Later the business was sold in two different parts: the light heavy transport to GE Curtis heavy haulage a Cleveland based subsidiary owned by Sarens in 1997 and the rest of the business to ALE in 1999 a Hixon based heavy haulage company which was later acquired by Mammoet in 2020. In 1996, Brambles Transport Services was sold to Toll Holdings.

In June 2000, Brambles sold its Eurotainer container business to Ermewa and Brinks Brambles armoured car unit to Chubb Security.

In August 2001, the support services activities of GKN (which included interest in CHEP and Cleanaway) were merged into a separate company, Brambles Industries plc (listed on the London Stock Exchange) which then entered became a dual-listed company with Brambles Industries Limited. In December 2001, the Wreckair equipment hire business was sold to Coates Hire.

In March 2002, the United Transport and Brambles Project Services businesses were sold to Patrick Corporation. In October 2002, the railway leasing business was sold to VTG-Lehnkering. In November 2002 the Brambles Shipping business, including the ships Tasmanian Achiever and Victorian Reliance, was sold to Toll Holdings.

In 2006, the company's Australian waste management business, Cleanaway Australia and its Brambles Industrial Services business were sold to Kohlberg Kravis Roberts. Cleanaway UK was sold to Veolia. Following these divestments, Brambles unified its Australian and British-listed entities into a single entity, Brambles Limited, that was listed on the Australian Securities Exchange in November 2006. Brambles maintained a secondary listing on the London Stock Exchange until March 2010.

In 2008, Brambles acquired LeanLogistics.

In April 2011 it acquired IFCO. In December 2012 it acquired Pallecon. In December 2013, the Recall storage business was spun-off. In February 2016 it acquired BXB Digital.
