= Tasmanian Achiever II =

Australian cargo ship

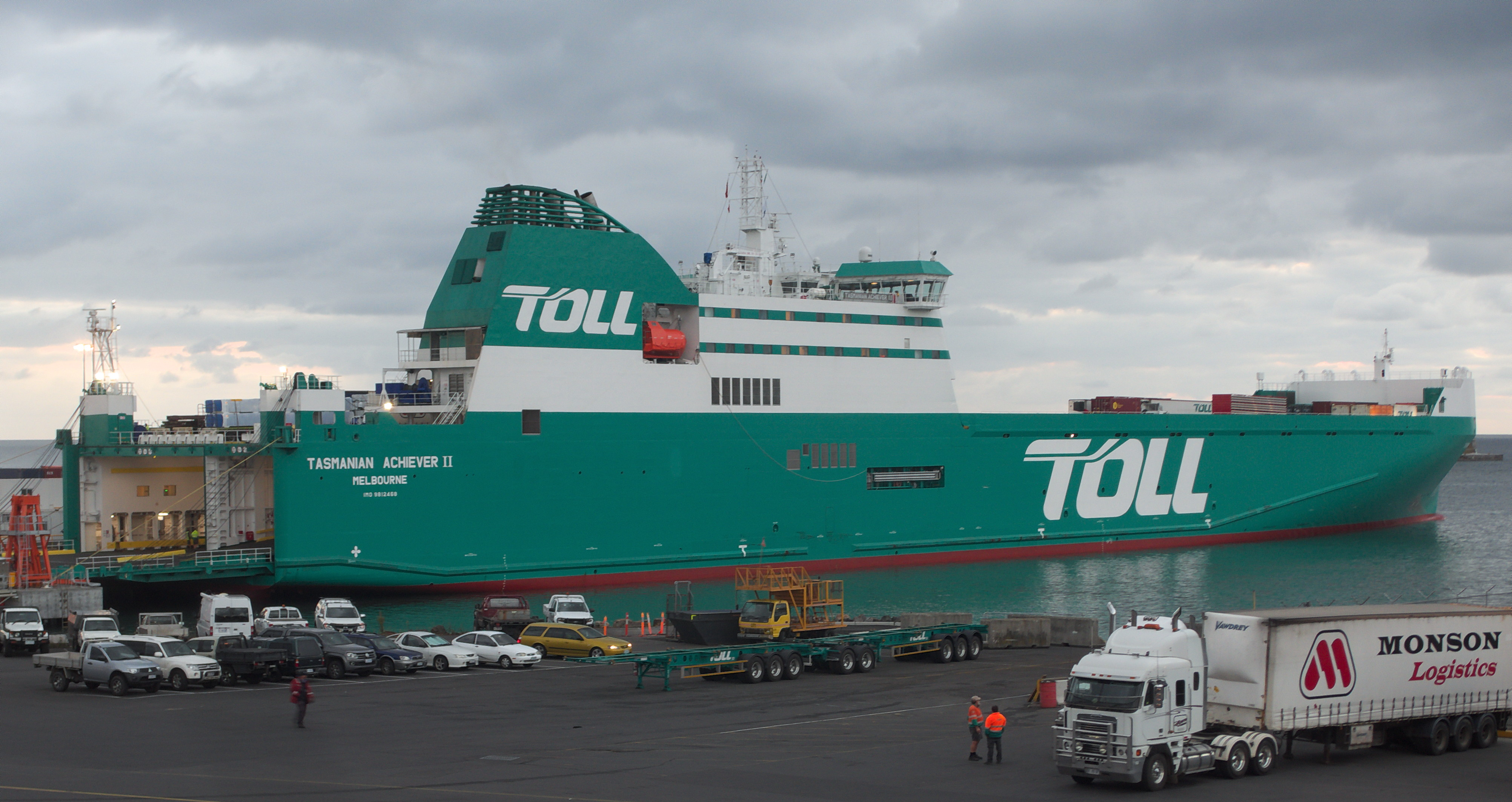
- Tasmanian Achiever II in Burnie in 2019

History
- Name: Tasmanian Achiever II
- Owner: Strait Link
- Operator: Strait Link
- Port of registry: Melbourne, Australia
- Route: Melbourne - Burnie
- Builder: CSC Jinling, Nanjing, China
- Cost: $172 million
- Christened: 17 February 2019
- Completed: 28 November 2018
- In service: 1 March 2019
- Identification: IMO number: 9812468; MMSI number: 503542000; Call sign: VMDG

General characteristics
- Type: Container and Roll-on/roll-off
- Tonnage: 20,000 GT, 12,000 DWT
- Length: 210.74 m (691.4 ft)
- Beam: 28 m (92 ft)
- Draught: 6.2 m (20 ft)
- Capacity: 700 TEU, 3,000 lane-metres

Tasmanian Achiever II is a cargo ship owned by Strait Link in Australia. It is primarily used on Bass Strait between Melbourne and Burnie. It replaced the Tasmanian Achiever. Along with its sister ship Victorian Reliance II, it was the largest cargo ship registered in Australia when introduced in March 2019.
