= Victorian Reliance II =

Cargo ship owner by Toll Shipping

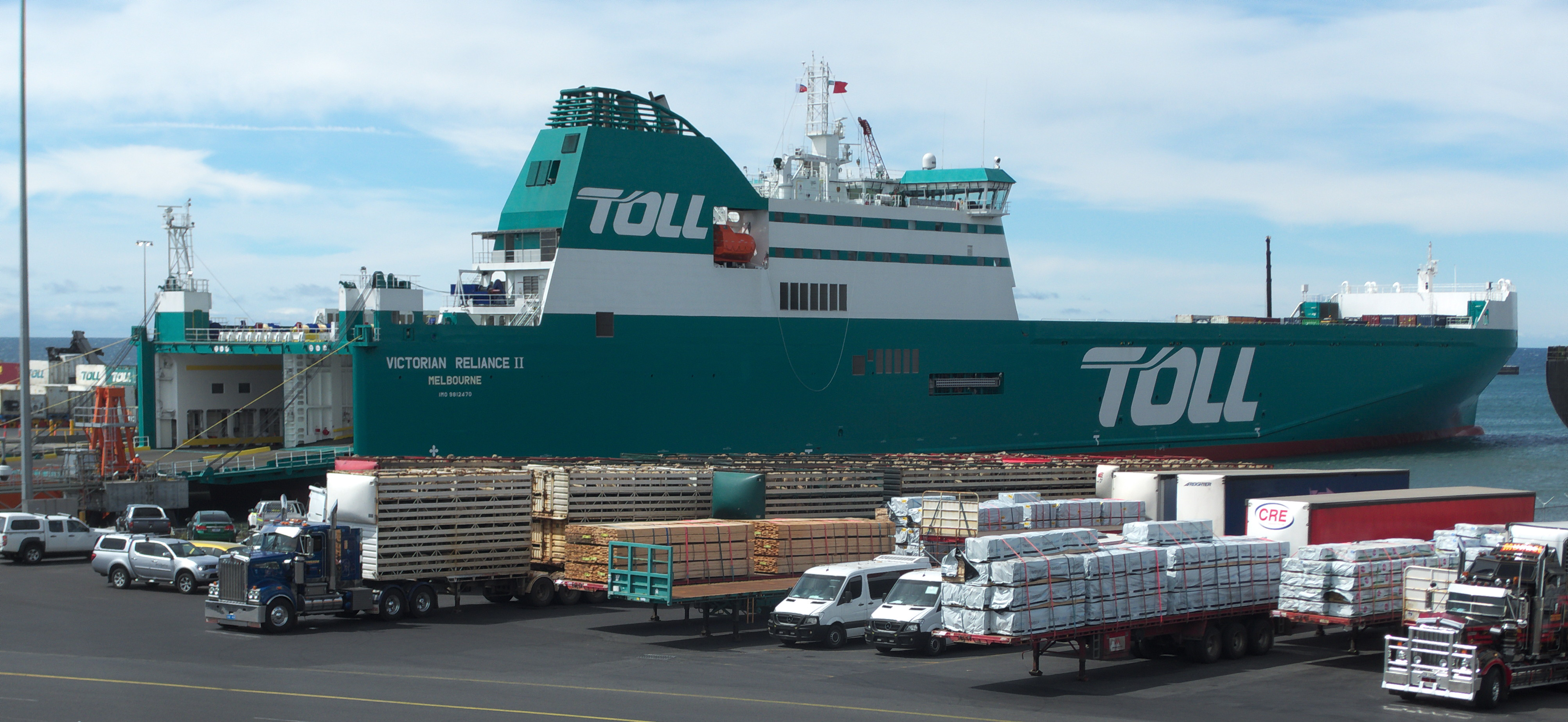
- Victorian Reliance II in Burnie in March 2019

History
- Name: Victorian Reliance II
- Owner: Strait Link
- Operator: Strait Link
- Port of registry: Melbourne, Australia
- Route: Melbourne - Burnie
- Builder: CSC Jinling, Nanjing, China
- In service: 1 March 2019
- Identification: IMO number: 9812470; MMSI number: 503795000; Call sign: VMYH

General characteristics
- Type: Container and Roll-on/roll-off
- Tonnage: 20,000 GT, 12,000 DWT
- Length: 210.74 m (691.4 ft)
- Beam: 28 m (92 ft)
- Draught: 6.2 m (20 ft)
- Capacity: 700 TEU, 3,000 lane-metres

The Victorian Reliance II is a cargo ship owned by Strait Link in Australia. It is primarily used on Bass Strait services between Melbourne and Burnie. It replaced the Victorian Reliance.

Along with its sister ship Tasmanian Achiever II, it was the largest cargo ship registered in Australia when introduced in March 2019.
