= Messina Line =

Italian shipping line

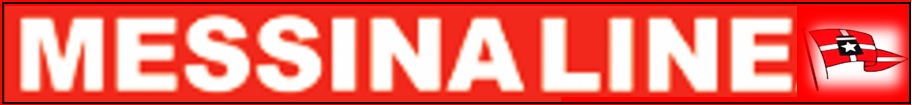

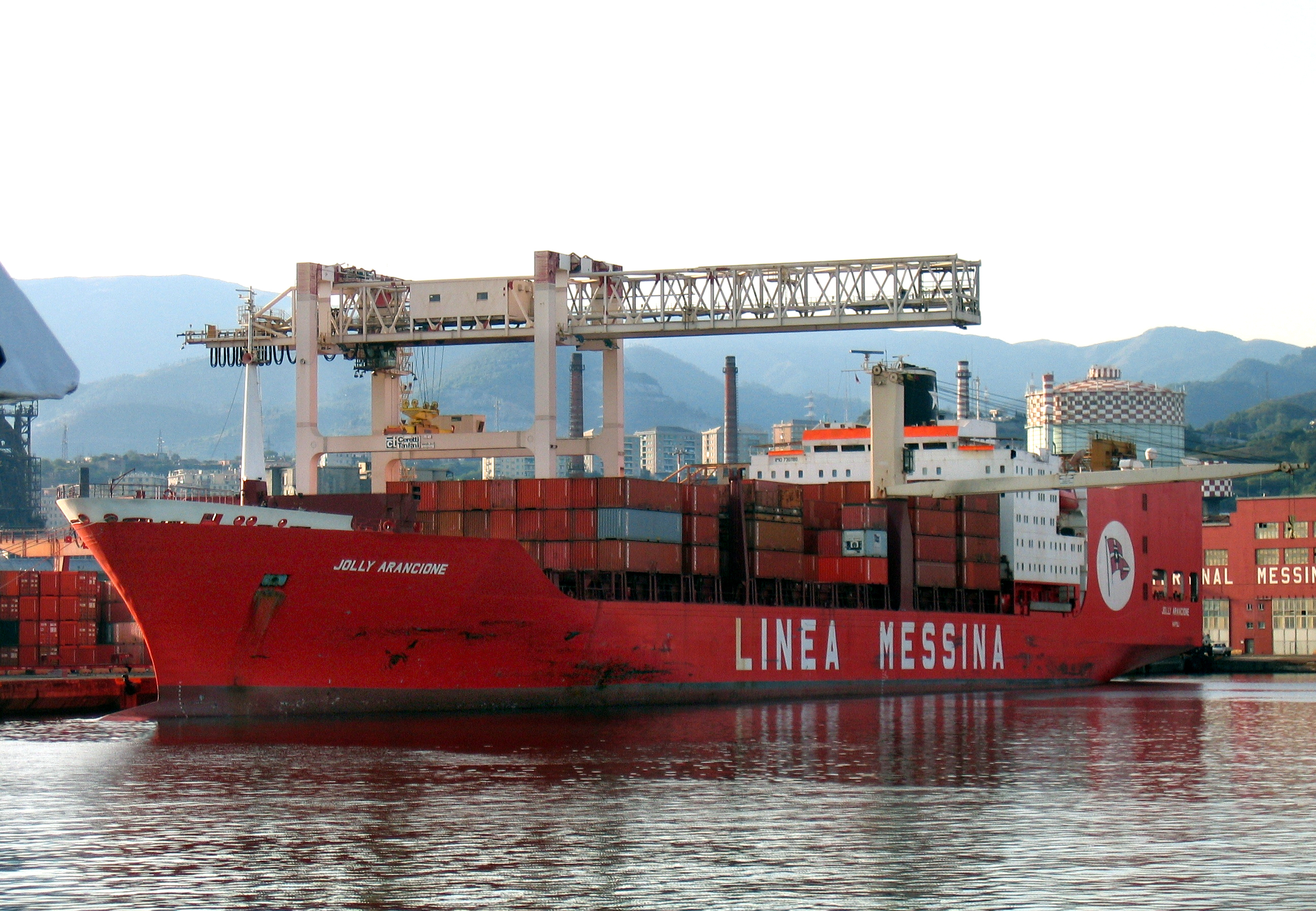
- Industry: Shipping, Logistics
- Founded: 1921
- Headquarters: Genoa, Italy
- Number of employees: 1100
- Website: https://www.messinaline.it

Messina Line is the maritime shipping division of Ignazio Messina & C., one of Italy's most historical shipping lines, operating 21 ships in between owned and chartered, and a total fleet of 41,000 TEU containers.

== Company overview ==
Messina Line's fleet mainly includes ConRO vessels, able to carry containers on weather deck, and roll-on/roll-off cargo under deck, loaded via quarter stern ramp.

The main services offered are intra Mediterranean, and Europe to East, South and West Africa and Middle East, plus a number of further destinations reached via transhipment. The company also owns a Container Terminal inside the port of Genoa, Italy.

The company started trading in 1921 as "Giuseppe Messina Tabuso", a small shipping line specialising in the distribution of perishables, carried from Sicily to Northern Italy ports. Once the office was moved to Genoa, new trade lanes were opened, including towards Libya. In 1929 the company changed name to "Ignazio Messina & C.", and is awarded the carriage of some postal services on behalf of the Italian Post Office towards North Africa and Libya. From 1935 additional services are added, towards Red Sea, including Port Sudan, Saudi Arabia and East Africa, and later towards Algeria, Lebanon and West Africa.

After the Second War World, the fleet suffered a number of losses, but was slowly rebuilt and enlarged.

In February 2017, Mediterranean Shipping Company purchased a 49% stake into Ignazio Messina & C., becoming the minority owner. Since 2018 some cooperative activities in between the two companies have started, including vessel chartering.

All Messina Line owned ships are named Jolly and include a colour spelled in Italian, in their names.

As of today, the company specializes in the maritime transport and distribution of shipping containers, automobiles, trucks, trailers, Mafi roll trailers, heavy construction machineries and further types of static and rolling freight.

== Facts and accidents ==
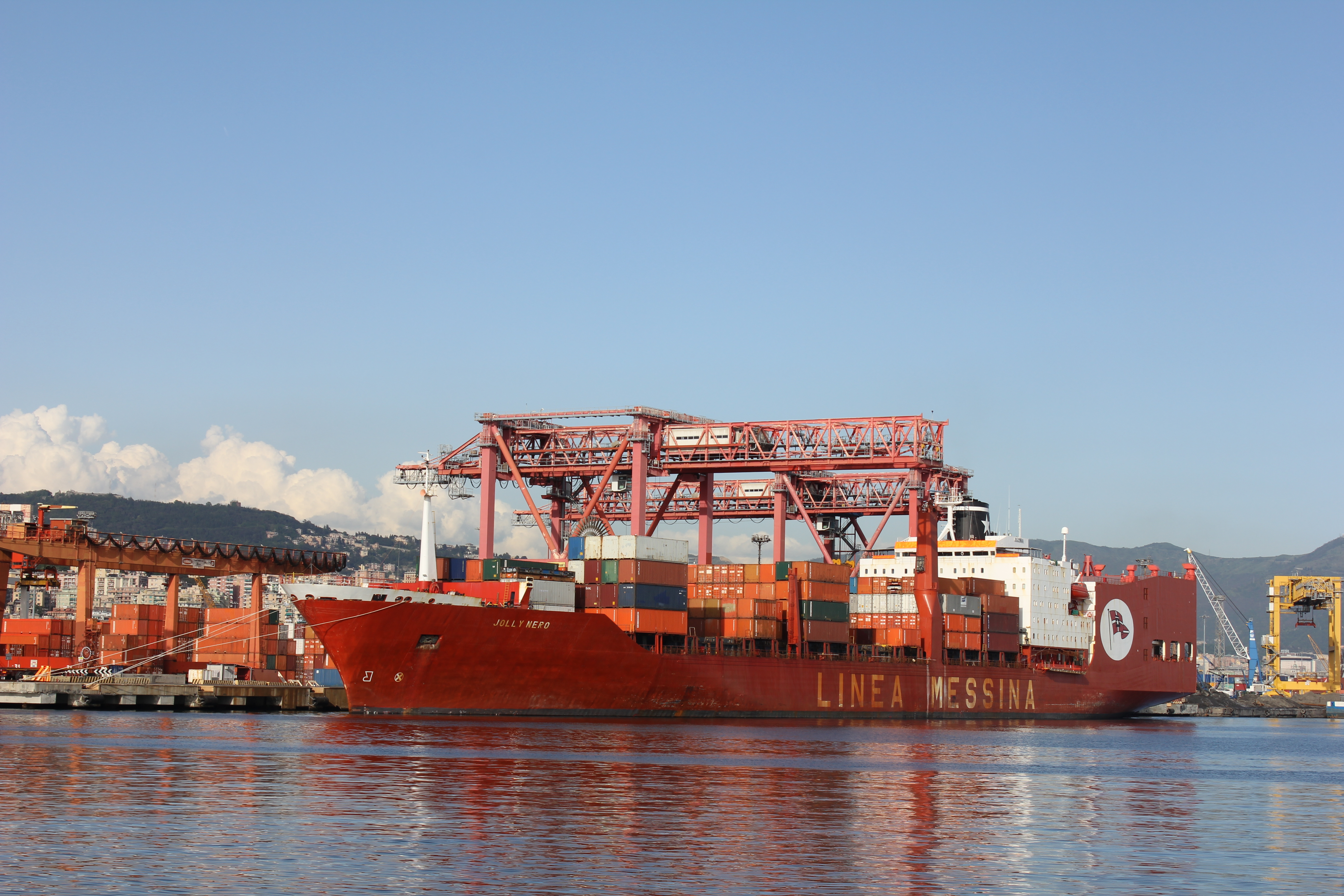
MV Jolly Nero, before the accident

In September 1987, MV Jolly Rubino was assaulted in Iran and several crew members were injured, requiring intervention of the Italian Navy.

In 1990, MV Jolly Rosso was investigated for toxic materials smuggling, after being found abandoned close to Cosenza shores.

In 2002, MV Jolly Rubino was lost at sea close to South Africa, due to a fire that broke out in the engine room.

In December 2010, MV Jolly Amaranto sunk in shallow water near the port of Alexandria in Egypt. The vessel faced a severe storm, developing serious listing. The 21 crew members were rescued, while the ship was lost along with her cargo (over 300 containers and several trucks and cars).

In August 2011, MV Jolly Grigio while sailing towards Marseille, collided with a fishing boat within Naples harbour. The collision caused the death of two fishermen, and the sinking of their boat.

In May 2013, MV Jolly Nero while manoeuvring within Genoa port basin, lost control hitting and tiering down the pilot corporation tower, killing 9 people and injuring 4.

In May 2023, three vessels were sold to US Department of Transportation Maritime Administration. The 6,300 lane metre capacity MV Jolly Cristallo (renamed MV Cape San Juan, IMO: 9578971), Jolly Perla (renamed MV Cape Starr, IMO: 9578969) and Jolly Quarzo (renamed MV Cape Sable, IMO: 9578983) for circa $90m each. A fourth, Jolly Diamante (renamed MV Liberty Power, IMO: 9578957), was sold months earlier. These vessels are intended to be replaced, to retain the same fleet capacity size.

== See also ==
House flag of the Messina Line

- Ignazio Messina & C.
- List of roll-on/roll-off vessel accidents
- Mediterranean Shipping Company
- Grimaldi Group
- Nippon Yusen Kaisha
- List of largest container shipping companies
