= Integrated Service Provider =

Type of logistics services firm

An Integrated Service Provider (ISP) is a for-hire firm that performs a variety of logistics service activities such as warehousing, transportation, and other functional activities that constitute a total service package. Additionally, other categories of spend may fall under the ISP's scope such as maintenance, repair, and operations (MRO) services. Firms providing such services typically have a good understanding of their customers' needs, and are responsible for executing services in accordance with contract documents. Normally the scope of work (SOW) and the ISP contract are finalized only after an extensive due diligence period.

== As a Service ==
The ISP provider may be contracted to perform a function or consolidate any number of activities required to support the customer's needs. In any case, normally the primary goal of the ISP is to achieve an overall cost savings for the customer. ISP providers normally work closely with the customer's management team within a facility to provide strategic sourcing to cut costs. In addition, the ISP and the customer normally will use key performance indicators that provide constant feedback on the performance of the ISP program. ISP firms can manage single or multiple categories of spend, such as facility management services, as part of a total integrated scope of work.

Management of an ISP contract is typically a joint effort with both sides designating an ISP Manager. These managers will normally have quarterly review meetings to review performance and feedback with the customer's facility management team. Managers will also develop and review strategies related to spend management.

ISP firms may be required to hold certain permits or licenses in order to perform services. To obtain information on state requirements, a firm may check with the Contractor's License Reference website as well as the National Contractor's website.

== Use Case ==
An organization would start an ISP program in order to achieve a specific cost savings for its manufacturing facility. An ISP provider is selected at the owner's facility to conduct due diligence and analyze prior year spend data. After a thorough analysis by both parties, a contract is developed to meet mutually agreed objectives. Typically a go-live date is set to begin services. At this point, the ISP provider has made all the appropriate preparations to provide agreed services.
