= Webb Dock =

Coordinates: 37°50′35″S 144°54′21″E

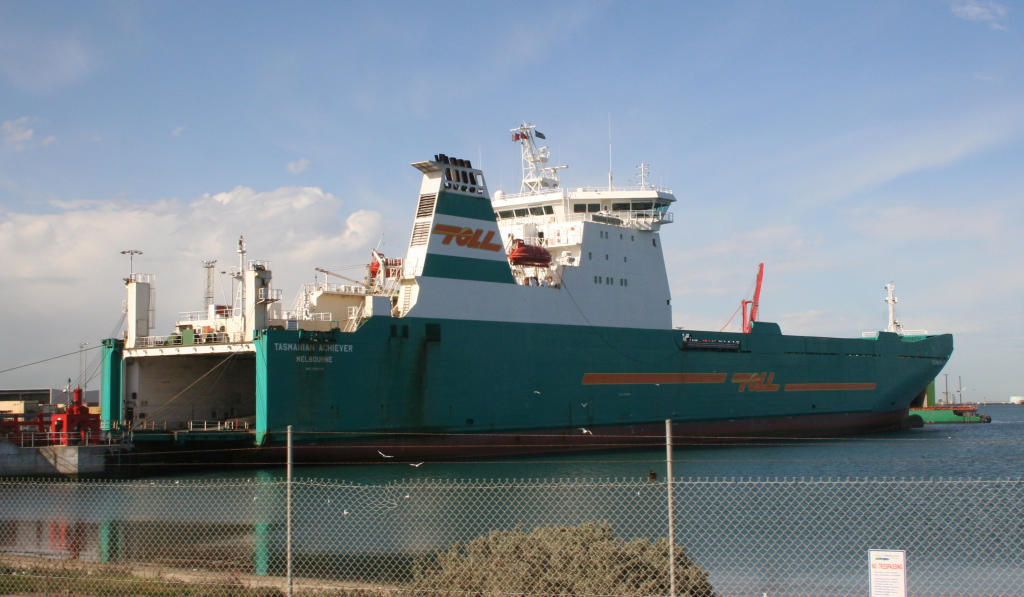
Roll-on/roll-off ship at Webb Dock

Webb Dock is a port facility at Fishermans Bend in Melbourne, Victoria constructed progressively from 1960, by dredging and land fill at the mouth of the Yarra River. It includes roll-on/roll-off facilities handling motor vehicle import and export and break bulk commodities and a container terminal. The dock is named after John Percival Webb OBE, a former Melbourne Harbor Trust commissioner.

== History ==
Shipping in Melbourne was initially accommodated at wharves on the Yarra River downstream of Queen Street, and for ships of deeper draught, at anchorages in Port Phillip. The Melbourne Harbor Trust acted on plans that had been developed in the immediate post war period, to construct a new dock at the mouth of the Yarra, which would reduce the turn-around time for shipping by avoiding the difficult route up to the river wharves. The shore at the head of Port Phillip Bay once accommodated fishermen's shacks, the last of which was demolished in the 1970s to expand the dock.

No.1 "roll‐on roll‐off" berth was completed and opened in 1959 with a road ramp and land area for the Princess of Tasmania passenger and vehicle ferry service. The Princess of Tasmania used Webb Dock from about 1959. This was the first berth of its type in Australia. No. 2 berth was completed in 1961 to accommodate the roll‐on roll‐off cargo vessel Bass Trader. No. 3 berth was built between 1967 and 1969, while No. 4 Berth was opened in 1975, and No. 5 in 1982.

The Webb Dock railway line and a rail terminal north of the dock were constructed in 1984-86 to link the dock with the West Melbourne rail yards but decommissioned in 1992 due to its impractically sharp bends and to enable the development of Docklands. The Yarra River crossing on the rail link was reused as a pedestrian bridge as part of Docklands precinct.

== Operation ==
The dock comprises 8 berths including a dedicated roll-on roll-off cargo terminal operated by Strait Link. It handles both container traffic and automobile imports. The Philippine company International Container Terminal Services "won a 40 year concession to operate the Webb Dock container terminal in May 2014, amidst opposition from unions."

Webb Dock East has five berths and 40 hectares of container stacking area. Berths 1 and 2 serve the Tasmanian coastal trade and three multi‐purpose general cargo berths and an automotive terminal accommodate cars, trucks, buses and other wheeled machinery, as well as bulk break commodities such as timber, wood pulp and newsprint. The ship loading installed in the 1980s were removed in mid 2014. Webb Dock West is Australia’s main terminal for motor vehicle imports and exports with over 370,000 new vehicles pass shipped in 2012‐13. It comprises “roll‐on roll‐off” ramps with a 19‐hectare automotive terminal with storage for 7000 vehicles.

== Redevelopment ==
Expansion of the container facilities was undertaken from 2014, to accommodate increased import trade and increase capacity to one million standard containers per year. This included reinstating container cranes, land fill north of the dock for container storage, expanded automotive terminal and new access roads.
