= Burger King legal issues =

Legal disputes and lawsuits concerning Burger King

The legal issues of Burger King include several legal disputes and lawsuits involving the international fast food restaurant chain Burger King (BK) as both plaintiff and defendant in the years since its founding in 1954. These have involved almost every aspect of the company's operations. Depending on the ownership and executive staff at the time of these incidents, the company's responses to these challenges have ranged from a conciliatory dialog with its critics and litigants to a more aggressive opposition with questionable tactics and negative consequences. The company's response to these various issues has drawn praise, scorn, and accusations of political appeasement from different parties over the years.

A diverse range of groups have raised issues, such as People for the Ethical Treatment of Animals (PETA), over the welfare of animals, governmental and social agencies over health issues and compliance with nutritional labeling laws, and unions and trade groups over labor relations and laws. These situations have touched on the concepts of animal rights, corporate responsibility and ethics, as well as social justice. While the majority of the disputes did not result in lawsuits, in many of the cases the situations raised legal questions, dealt with statutory compliance, or resulted in legal remedies such as changes in contractual procedure or binding agreements between parties. The resolutions to these legal matters have often altered the way the company interacts and negotiates contracts with its suppliers and franchisees or how it does business with the public.

Further controversies have occurred because of the company's involvement in the Middle East. The opening of a Burger King location in the Israeli-occupied territories led to a breach of contract dispute between Burger King and its Israeli franchise; the dispute eventually erupted into a geopolitical conflagration involving Muslim and Jewish groups on multiple continents over the application of and adherence to international law. The case eventually elicited reactions from the members of the 22-nation Arab League; the Islamic countries within the League made a joint threat to the company of legal sanctions including the revocation of Burger King's business licenses within the member states' territories. A second issue involving members of the Islamic faith over the interpretation of the Muslim version of Canon Law, Shariah, regarding the promotional artwork on a dessert package in the United Kingdom raised issues of cultural sensitivity, and, with the former example, posed a larger question about the lengths to which companies must go to ensure the smooth operation of their businesses in the communities they serve.

A trademark dispute involving the owners of the identically named Burger King in Mattoon, Illinois led to a federal lawsuit; the case's outcome helped define the scope of the Lanham act and trademark law in the United States. An existing trademark held by a shop of the same name in South Australia forced the company to change its name in Australia, while another state trademark in Texas forced the company to abandon its signature product, the Whopper, in several counties around San Antonio. The company was only able to enter northern Alberta, in Canada, in 1995, after it paid the founders of another chain named Burger King.

Legal decisions from other suits have set contractual law precedents in regards to long-arm statutes, the limitations of franchise agreements, and ethical business practices; many of these decisions have helped define general business dealings that continue to shape the entire marketplace.

== Legal disputes and agreements ==
=== Animal welfare ===
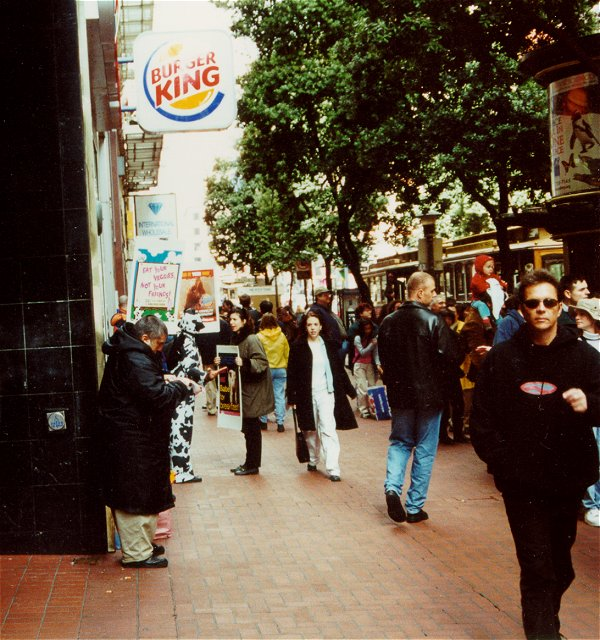
2001 protest by veganism proponents outside a Burger King restaurant in San Francisco, California

In 2001, the animal rights group PETA began targeting fast food chains in the United States regarding the treatment of chickens by suppliers such as Tyson Foods. Using parodies of corporate logos and slogans, the group sought to publicly embarrass the companies into changing their corporate policies in dealing with their poultry suppliers. After winning concessions from McDonald's with its "McCruelty" campaign, the group targeted Burger King with a six-month campaign it called Murder King. The group and its supporters, with the backing of celebrities including Alec Baldwin, James Cromwell, and Richard Pryor, staged protests outside Burger King restaurants across the United States, calling on the company to establish these new compliance guidelines. On June 28, 2001, Burger King entered into an agreement with the group and established a contractual framework that defined procedures to ensure that its suppliers were conforming to the agreed-upon standards of animal welfare. These changes, along with the company's new vegetarian offering, the BK Veggie sandwich, drew praise from the group.

In 2006, PETA went before Burger King's board of directors during its parent company's annual corporate meeting to request that poultry suppliers switched to a more-humane method of slaughter called controlled atmosphere killing (CAK). Instead of using its previous tactic of stating that the procedure is more humane, the group claimed that CAK was economically more feasible as it reduces the chances of injury to workers in poultry factories and it produces better products by preventing injury to the animal. Responding to the proposal in March 2007, Burger King announced it would make further changes to its animal-welfare policies. The new policies favor suppliers of chickens that utilize CAK rather than electric shock to knock birds unconscious before slaughter, and require its pork and poultry suppliers to upgrade the living conditions of pigs and chickens. Under the agreement, 2% of BK's North American egg suppliers are to use cage-free-produced eggs and 10% of pork suppliers are to use crate-free pigs for its pork products. PETA and the Humane Society of the United States were quoted as saying that Burger King's initiatives put it ahead of its competitors in terms of animal rights and welfare and that they were hopeful that the new initiatives would trigger reform throughout the fast food industry as a whole.

=== Nutrition ===
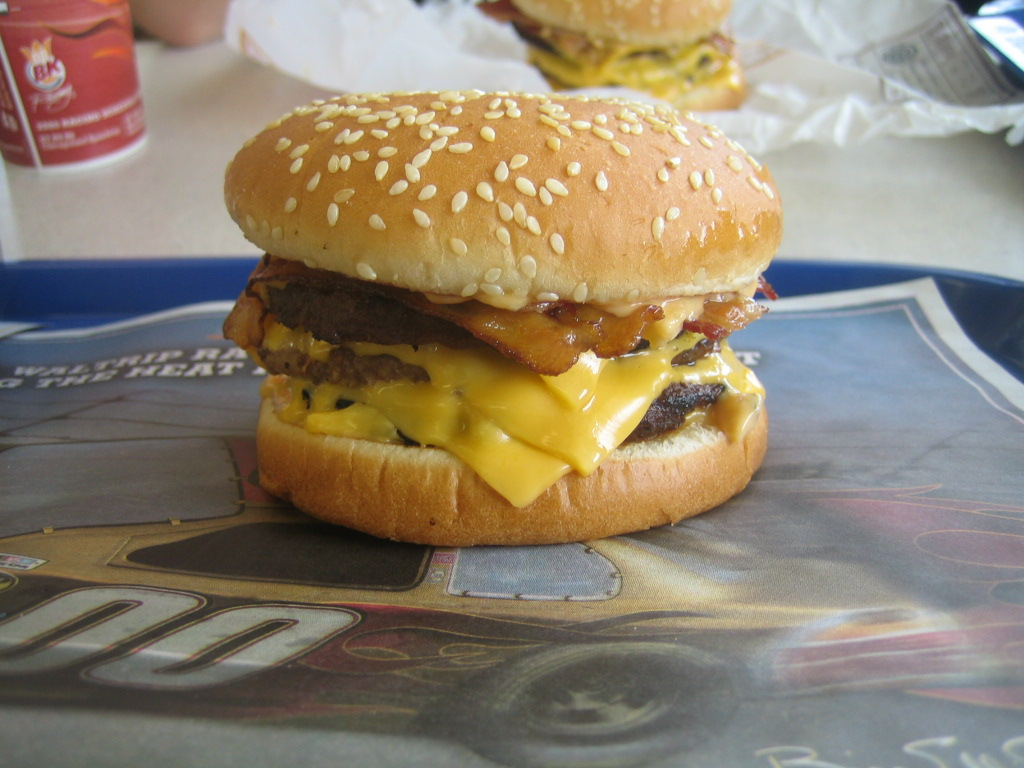
The Burger King Quad Stacker sandwich. At 1,000 calories and 68 g (2.4 oz) of fat per serving, it is half the daily caloric intake and 3 g more than the daily fat intake for an adult as recommended by the USDA.

Since the 1980s, several parties, including the Center for Science in the Public Interest (CSPI), the City of New York, and the Spanish government, have argued that Burger King has contributed to obesity and unhealthy eating behaviors in Western nations by producing products that contain large amounts of salt, fat, trans-fat and calories. After its purchase by TPG Capital from former parent company Diageo in 2002, the company introduced several large, oversized products including its European BK XXL line, the Enormous Omelet Sandwich line and the BK Stacker line. These new offerings, and others like them, have resulted in further international scorn and negative attention due to the large portion size and increased amounts of unhealthy fats and trans-fats in these items. Many consumer groups have accused Burger King and other fast food restaurant chains of failing to provide healthier alternatives.

A 1985 agreement with the New York city public health commissioner's office, over publication of nutritional data regarding the food it sells, helped define guidelines used by the city for the dissemination of nutritional information. In a five-month negotiation with Burger King and its then parent Grand Metropolitan PLC (now part of Diageo), the company agreed to post complete nutritional information that complied with the Federal Government's guidelines for the maximum daily recommended intake of fat and sodium. Additionally the data was to be presented in a format easy for the general public to understand and use. On the basis of this agreement, New York public health commissioner Mark Green, with support of Mayor David Dinkins, proposed legislation that would require all fast food restaurants to display nutritional data as well.

In response to the 2006 introduction of the BK XXL product line in Spain, the Spanish Health Ministry publicly claimed that the company had violated a voluntary agreement between the company and the Spanish Federation of Hoteliers and Restaurateurs, a group to which Burger King belongs, that called on its members to refrain from advertising large portions of food. The Minister of Health, Elena Salgado, claimed that the new promotion and the new sandwiches, averaging over 970 calories each, violated the accord. The head of Spain's food regulatory body, Felix Lobo, stated a legal case could be made against Burger King for "illegally failing to comply with a contract". In a response to the Government's allegations, the European offices of Burger King released this statement: "In this campaign, we are simply promoting a line of burgers that has formed part of our menu in recent years. Our philosophy can be summed up with the motto 'As you like it,' in which our customers' taste trumps all." The company also explained that it had always worked "to reduce the risk of illness provoked by an inadequate diet and to promote a balanced ... diet." A spokesperson for the company stated that customers have the choice of salads versus a Whopper, that they have the option to modify their sandwiches as they please, and that the company was going to continue to advertising the products.

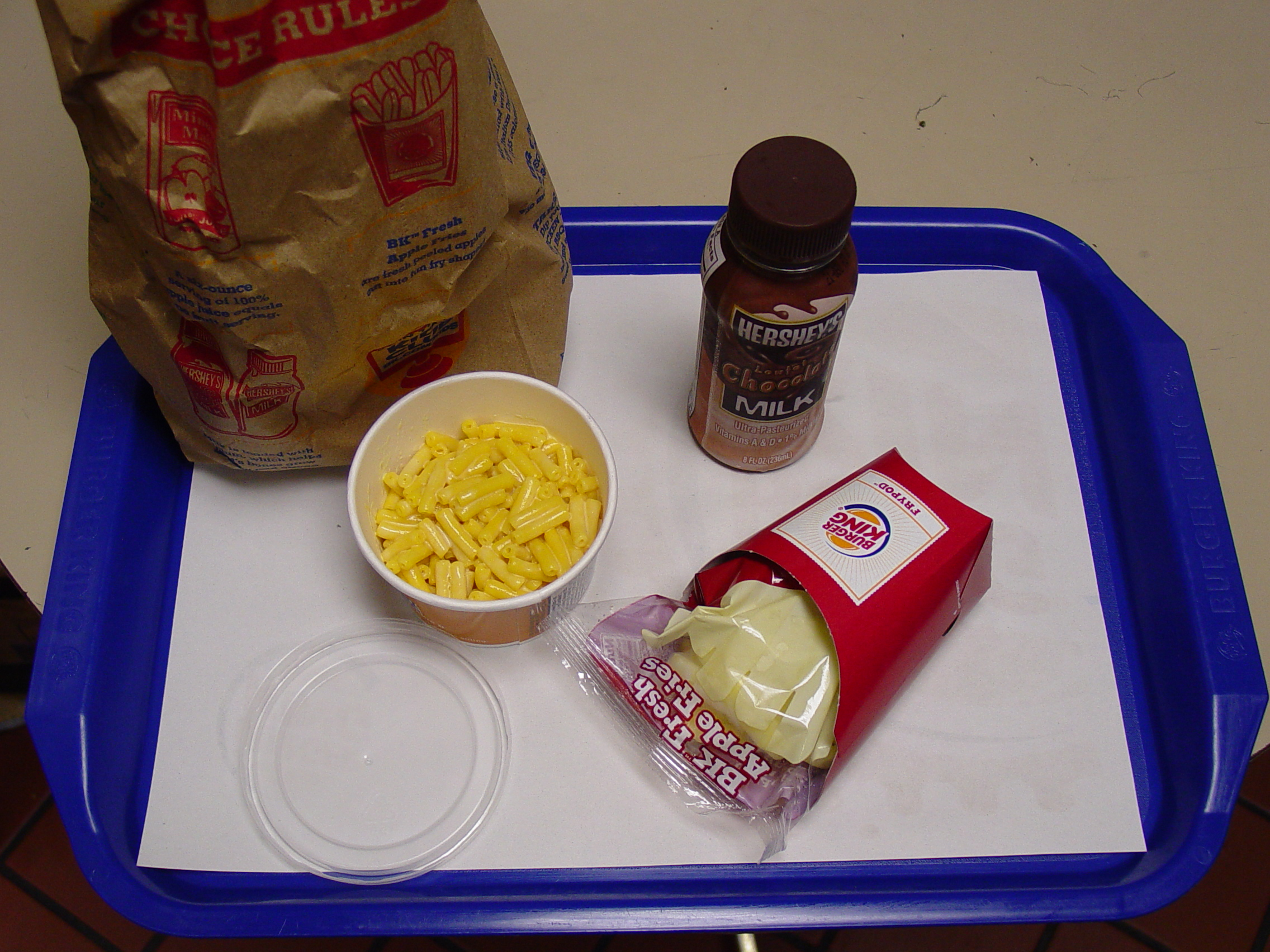
Burger King's lower fat kids' meal with apples, macaroni and cheese, and low-fat chocolate milk

In May 2007, the Center for Science in the Public Interest (CSPI) sought a state-level class action lawsuit against Burger King in the Superior Court for the District of Columbia over the inclusion of trans-fats in foods served by Burger King and Burger King's failure to set a definitive time line for their elimination from the company's menu. The CSPI suit sought to require the company to place large health warnings on Burger King's food packaging that explained the dangers of trans-fat and the levels of trans-fat contained in its products. Burger King sought to move the case to the Federal courts and have the suit dismissed. The Federal Court denied the company's motion for dismissal and sent the case back to the Superior Court for trial. To address the CSPI's legal challenge, as well as several laws passed in New York City, Philadelphia and other cities regarding the issue of trans-fats in its food, BK announced a plan in July 2007 to phase out all trans-fats from its products by the end of 2008.

In response to the issue of childhood obesity, Burger King announced in October 2007 that it was joining The Council of Better Business Bureau's Children's Food and Beverage Advertising Initiative. The program is a voluntary self-regulation program designed to modify advertising messages aimed at children so as to encourage healthier eating habits and lifestyles. As part of its participation in the program, Burger King announced a series of steps in its advertising and children's product lines to which it was committing itself:

- Restricting advertising to children under 12 that uses third-party licensed characters to Kids Meals that meet its Nutrition Guidelines
- Refraining from advertising in elementary schools and from product placement in media primarily aimed at children under 12
- Promoting Kids Meals that meet its Nutrition Guidelines on its Web site
- Promoting healthy lifestyles and healthy dietary choices in advertising

The modified Kid's Meal line will include new products, such as broiled Chicken Tenders, apple "fries" (French cut, raw apples served in a fry box), and Kraft macaroni and cheese. According to the statement by the company's corporate parent, Burger King Brands, the meals will contain no more than 560 calories per meal, with less than 30 percent of the calories derived from fat, less than 10 percent of the calories from saturated fat, no added trans fats and no more than 10 percent of calories derived from added sugars. As of August 1, 2008, Burger King has introduced the product line in the United States, but not the broiled Chicken Tenders product available in the United Kingdom and Ireland.

=== Labor ===
Map showing the Immokalee region of South Florida

A protracted South Florida labor dispute between the Coalition of Immokalee Workers (CIW) and growers of tomatoes in the region expanded to include Burger King and other major fast food companies, including McDonald's and Yum! Brands. In 2001, the CIW sought a pay raise for tomato pickers in the region and, starting with its Boot the Bell campaign aimed at Yum! subsidiary Taco Bell, began to target the chains with protests, letter writing campaigns, and petitions demanding that the companies purchase tomatoes only from suppliers who agree to the pay increase. The campaign, which eventually attracted the support of religious groups, labor organizations, student groups and anti-slavery activists, became known as the Campaign for Fair Food with a stated goal to increase the wages of the pickers by 1¢ per pound picked above the 45¢ paid per bucket at the time, or about 77¢ for each 32-pound (14.5 kg) bucket in 2005 US dollars. In 2005, McDonald's Corporation and Yum! signed agreements acquiescing to the group's purchasing demands, although implementation was put on hold due to threats by the Florida Tomato Growers Exchange to fine its members $100,000 if they complied; however, Burger King corporate parent Burger King Brands declined to enter into a similar agreement with the group.

A December 2007 QSR Magazine article about the conflict claimed that Burger King Brands had devised a contingency plan to remove itself from the dispute. Citing internal company documents, the Associated Press stated BK had concerns that such agreements might prove to be a possible violation of anti-trust laws, had possible tax implications, and that there were issues with third-party oversight for the agreements. As part of the company's plan, QSR Magazine claimed that the company was going to cease purchasing product from suppliers with whom the CIW was in disagreement. In response, the company issued a press release in February 2007 claiming that while it is a large purchaser, it is not responsible for the pay rates of it suppliers' workers as wage disputes are the province of the producer. BK also pointed out that it has an open offer of employment for any dissatisfied CIW members and scholarships (through its Have it Your Way Foundation) for family members of CIW workers.

In the release, Steven Grover, BK Vice President of Global Food Safety, Quality Assurance, and Regulatory Compliance, confirmed the factuality of the QSR report and that if the dispute between the growers and the CIW continues, the company would go forward with its plans to stop purchasing tomatoes from farms in the Immokalee region. The company stated it would purchase only one percent of its tomatoes from that area and other suppliers could easily make up the difference. Speaking on the dispute, Grover stated, "We’re being asked to do something that we have legal questions about. We want to find a way to make sure that workers are protected and receive a decent wage." CIW spokesperson Julia Perkins faulted this move, stating, "... farm workers across the country and world face the same problems as those in the Immokalee region, but many do not have a human rights organization, such as the CIW, to stand up for their interests. Running away from the scene of the crime, does that make you any more innocent? Are they really willing to pay an exorbitantly higher transportation cost[s] to bring in tomatoes from overseas or Mexico and pass that on to their customers rather than pay a penny more per pound?"

In an April 2008 Senate hearing chaired by U.S. Sen. Bernie Sanders (I-VT) regarding farm conditions, Eric Schlosser, author of the best-selling Fast Food Nation, commented on Burger King's recalcitrance to sign an agreement with the CIW while Yum! and McDonald's had. Schlosser stated, "The admirable behavior of these two industry giants makes the behavior or Burger King ... seem completely unjustifiable."

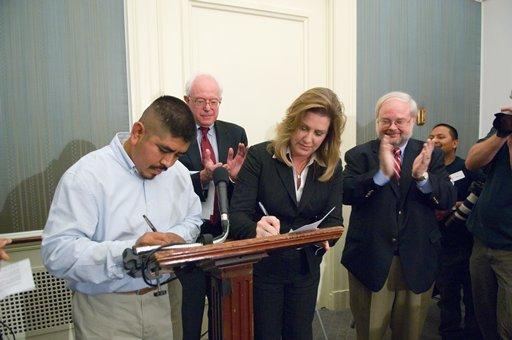
Sen. Sanders overseeing the signing of the agreement between the CIW and Burger King

In May 2008, several issues came to the fore that damaged the credibility of Burger King and its position on the topic. Steven Grover was found to be trolling websites that have posted pro-CIW positions and opinions; under an assumed screen name, Grover posted several comments disparaging the ethics and honesty of the leadership of the group. Besides the trolling incident, Grover was tied to several terse, stridently worded e-mails sent from a possibly fictitious employee name at the BK global headquarters in Miami to supporters and media groups; the company labeled these communications as unsanctioned and not reflecting official corporate positions. Additionally, Burger King was found to have hired an outside security company, Pembroke Pines, Florida based Diplomatic Tactical Services, to infiltrate the CIW and its supporting groups and spy on their members. After these issues came to light, BK terminated Grover and company spokesman Keva Silversmith, as well as its relationship with Diplomatic Tactical Services. Critics of the personnel action, such as PR Watch editor Sheldon Rampton, noted that it appeared that the two terminated employees were being made scapegoats by the company. Rampton went on to note that Silversmith had been, up to a few weeks before the story came to light, employed by the PR firm Edelman, which had been contracted by company parent Burger King Brands to provide PR services; Edelman has employed tactics on the behalf of its other clients, Wal-Mart and Microsoft, which Rampton and his organization termed "sleazy". Sen. Sanders agreed with Rampton's claim of scapegoating, and called for hearings into the incidents to investigate the company's behaviors to see if other Burger King officers had instigated the attacks on the labor group as company policy. Sanders stated that he wished to "make sure that we find out how high up the corporate ladder this scheme went".

The issue was resolved on May 23, 2008 when BK CEO John Chidsey announced an agreement with the CIW granting the requested 1¢ pay increase to the workers. Chidsey also apologized on behalf of the company for the comments made about the pickers and the behavior of Grover and Silversmith. Additionally, the company agreed to provide a ½¢ per pound payment to the CIW to cover payroll taxes and administrative costs for the tomato growers.

=== Israel, Palestine, and the occupied territories ===
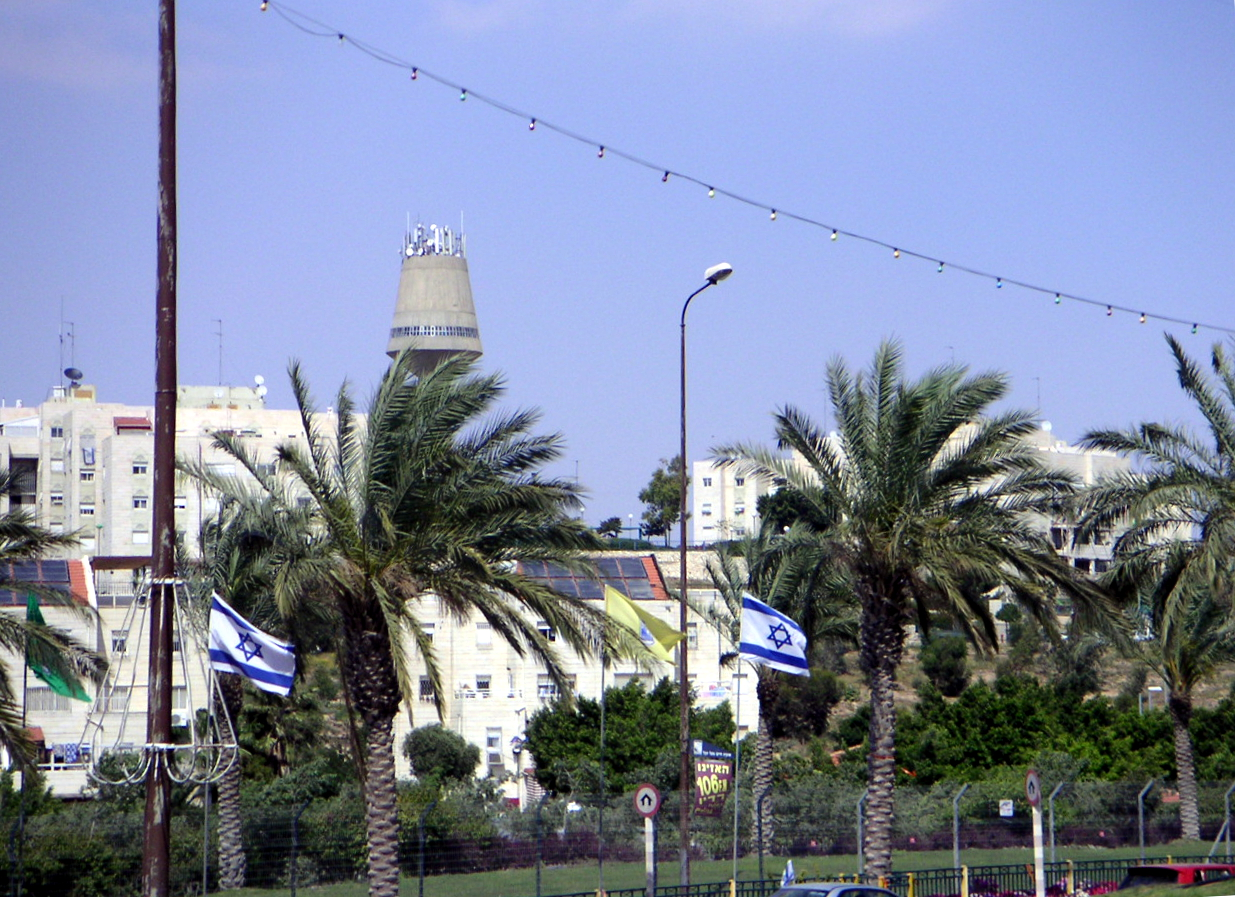
A view of the Ma'aleh Adumim settlement

In the summer of 1999, a geopolitical dispute with the global Islamic community and Jewish groups in the United States and Israel arose over an Israeli franchisee opening stores in the Israeli-occupied territories. When Burger King franchisee in Israel, Rikamor, Ltd., opened a store in the West Bank settlement of Ma'aleh Adumim in August of that year, Islamic groups, including the Arab League and American Muslims for Jerusalem, argued that international Burger King parent Burger King Corporation's licensing of the store helped legitimize the disputed Israeli settlement. Beyond the called-for Islamic boycott of the company, the Arab League also threatened the revocation of the business licenses of Burger King's primary Middle Eastern franchise in the 22 countries that are part of the League's membership.

Burger King Corporation quickly pulled the franchise license for that location and had the store shuttered explaining that Rikamor, Ltd. had violated its contract by opening the location in the West Bank. Several American-based Jewish groups issued statements that denounced the decision as acceding to threats of boycotts by Islamic groups. Burger King Corporation issued a statement that it "made this decision purely on a commercial basis and in the best interests of thousands of people who depend on the Burger King reputation for their livelihood".

=== Islamic relations ===
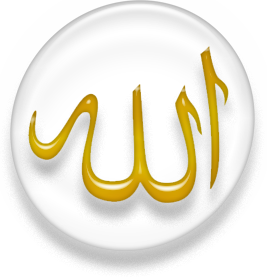
The Islamic symbol for Allah (simplified)

An issue of a religious nature arose in 2005 in the United Kingdom when Burger King introduced a new prepackaged ice cream product; the label of the product included a silhouette of the ice cream that when rotated on its side bore a resemblance to the Islamic inscription for God, Allah (الله). When a British Muslim named Rashad Akhtar, a resident of the community of High Wycombe, was presented with the ice cream cone in a Park Royal Burger King restaurant, he noticed the resemblance and became angered at what he felt was an offense to the Islamic faith. After being informed of the likeness, the local Islamic group Muslim Council of Britain pointed out the issue of the possible interpretation to Burger King and its relevance to Shariah, the Muslim version of canon law which governs the lives of members of the Islamic faith and carries the same weight as civil law in their belief structure. The company responded by voluntarily recalling the product and reissuing it with a new label. Akhtar was not satisfied with the company's withdrawal of the product.

In response to the perceived blasphemy, Akhtar declared it was his personal jihad to find those responsible for the packaging and destroy their professional status, personal life and the UK as a whole for having a culture allowing the insult to occur. This event, Akhtar's reaction and other similar issues with companies such as Nike and Unilever have been used by conservative political critics, such as James Joyner, claiming that western nations and organizations are kowtowing in too easily to Muslims' claims or threats and by commentators, including author Daniel C. Dennett, highlighting how factions of the Islamic faith gravitate towards iconoclasm.

== Cases of note ==
=== Burger King Corporation v. Hungry Jack's Pty Limited ===
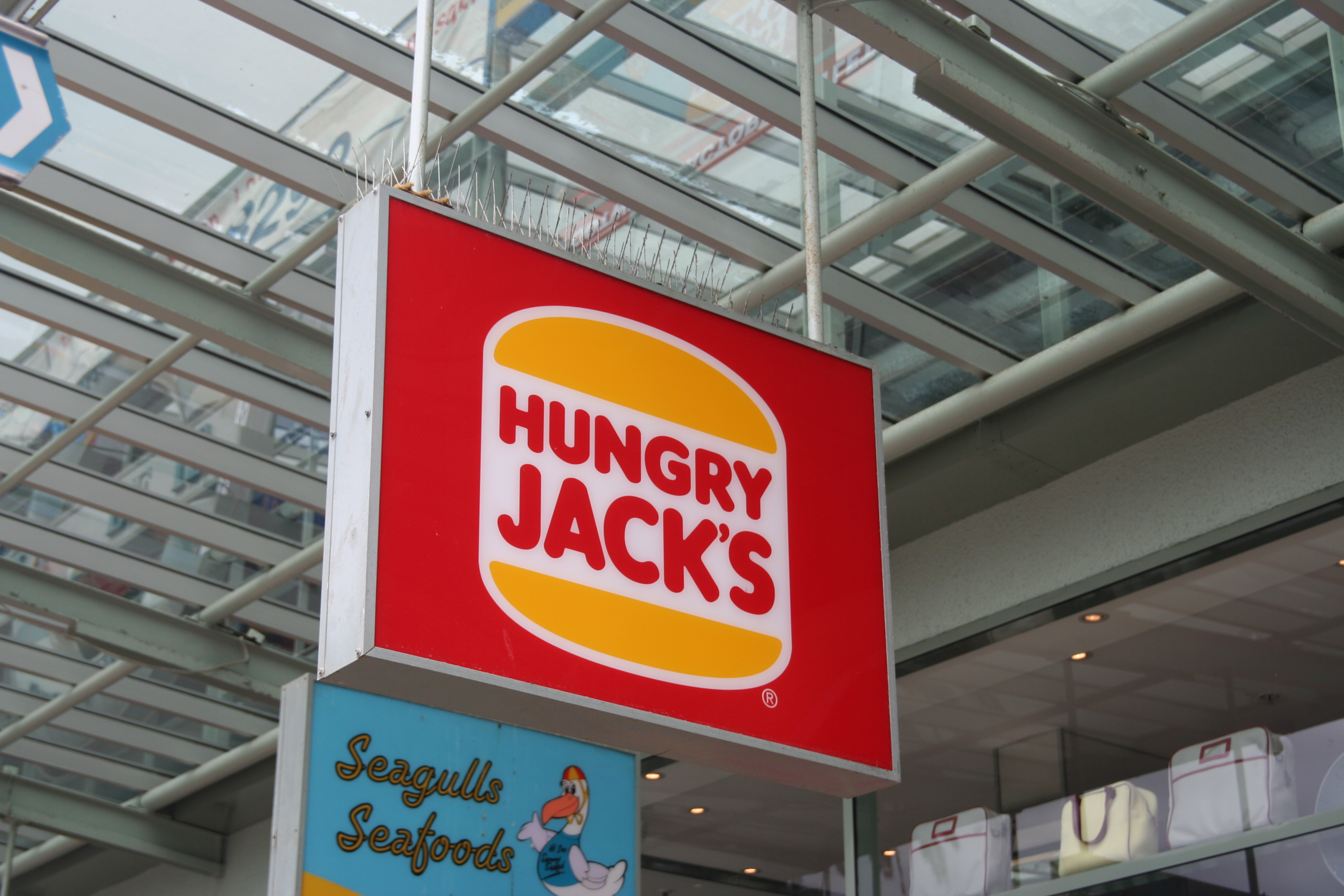
A sign outside a Hungry Jack's location in Sydney, Australia

When Burger King moved to expand its operations into Australia in the early 1970s, its business name was already trademarked by a takeaway food shop in Adelaide. As a result, Burger King provided the Australian franchisee, Jack Cowin, with a list of possible alternative names derived from pre-existing trademarks already registered by Burger King and its then corporate parent Pillsbury that could be used to name the Australian restaurants. Cowin selected the Hungry Jack brand name, one of Pillsbury's US pancake mixture products, and slightly changed the name to the possessive form, Hungry Jack's. The first Australian franchise of Burger King Corporation was established in Perth in 1971, under the auspices of Cowin's new company Hungry Jack's Pty, Limited.

In 1990, Hungry Jack's renewed its franchise agreement with then BK parent Burger King Corporation, which allowed Hungry Jack's to license third party franchisee. One of the terms and conditions of the renewed agreement required Hungry Jack's to open a minimum number of new locations each year for the duration of the contract. Shortly after the Australian trademark on the Burger King name lapsed in 1996, Burger King requested that Cowin rebrand the Hungry Jack's locations to Burger King, which Cowin declined. Burger King Corporation accused Hungry Jack's of violating the conditions of the renewed franchise agreement by failing to expand the chain at the rate defined and sought to terminate the agreement. Under the aegis of this claim, Burger King Corporation, in partnership with Royal Dutch Shell's Australian division Shell Company of Australia Ltd., began to open its own stores in 1997 beginning in Sydney and extending throughout the regions of New South Wales, Australian Capital Territory and Victoria. In addition, BK sought to limit HJ's ability to open new locations in the country, whether they were corporate locations or third-party licensees.

As a result of Burger King's actions, Hungry Jack's owner Jack Cowin and his private holding company Competitive Foods Australia began legal proceedings in 2001 against Burger King's parent Burger King Corporation with a counter-claim that the company had violated the conditions of the master franchising agreement and was in breach of the contract. In a decision handed down by the Supreme Court of New South Wales that affirmed Cowin's claims, Burger King was determined to have violated the terms of the contract and as a result was required to pay Cowin and Hungry Jack's a A$46.9 million (US$41.6 million 2001) award. (Note: Burger King Corporation v Hungry Jack's Pty Ltd [2001] NSWCA 187) The court's decision was one of the first major cases in Australia that implied that the American legal concept of good faith negotiations existed with the framework of the Australian legal system, which until that verdict, had rarely been seen in the country's courts. In its decision, the Court stated that Burger King had failed to act in good faith during contract negotiations by seeking to include standards and clauses that would engineer a default of the franchise agreement, allowing the company to limit the number of new Hungry Jack's branded restaurants and ultimately claim the Australian market as its own, a purpose that was extraneous to the agreement. (Note: Burger King obtained special leave to appeal to the High Court:[2002] HCATrans 180 (19 April 2002), however the appeal was later dismissed by consent: [2002] HCATrans 578 (14 November 2002).)

After Burger King Corporation lost the case, it decided to terminate its operations in the country, and in July 2002, the company transferred its assets to its New Zealand franchise group, Trans-Pacific Foods (TPF). The terms of the sale had TPF assume oversight of the Burger King franchises in the region as the Burger King brand's master franchisee. Trans-Pacific Foods administered the chain's 81 locations until September 2003 when the new management team of Burger King Corporation reached an agreement with Hungry Jack's Pty Ltd to re-brand the existing Burger King locations to Hungry Jack's and make HJP the sole master franchisee of both brands. An additional part of the agreement required Burger King Corporation to provide administrative and advertising support as to insure a common marketing scheme for the company and its products. Trans-Pacific Foods transferred its control of the Burger King franchises to Hungry Jack's Pty Ltd, which subsequently renamed the remaining Burger King locations as Hungry Jack's.

=== Burger King v. Rudzewicz ===
In 1979, two Michigan businessmen, John Rudzewicz and Brian MacShara, entered into a franchise agreement with Burger King to run a restaurant in Detroit, Michigan. After MacShara attended four months of training courses at the regional Burger King training facilities in Michigan and in the Florida headquarters on how to operate and administer a Burger King franchise, it was agreed that the partners would take over operation of an existing Burger King location in Drayton Plains, Michigan. However, during this time disagreements arose between the partners and Burger King over issues of rent, construction fees, building designs and the assignment of legal liabilities. MacShara and Ruzewicz finally signed their franchise agreement after gaining limited concessions over the issues, with Rudzewicz assuming a 20-year, $1,000,000 financial obligation over the life of the contract.

Due to a recessionary period in the United States beginning with the energy crisis in late 1979, sales began to decline at the location and the partnership failed to pay their required franchise fees and rent service to Burger King Corporation. After attempts over the intervening months to negotiate a compromise with MacShara and Ruzewicz failed, (Note: Teply, p. 246 – Burger King's policy was to have the corporate home office negotiate directly with franchises that were in financial distress in order to come to a solution mutually resolving the issue.) Burger King terminated the franchise agreement and ordered the pair to vacate the property. Rudzewicz and MacShara refused to comply and continued operation of their restaurant even after they were served the notice. Burger King response was to file a lawsuit in May 1981 in the United States District Court for the Southern District of Florida claiming breach of contract and trademark infringement. Burger King sought an injunction against the pair preventing them from operating the restaurant and seeking damages because MacShara and Ruzewicz were "... tortiously infringing its [Burger King] trademarks and service marks through their continued, unauthorized operation as a Burger King restaurant". The company also sought reimbursement of all legal fees and costs associated with the filing.

The defendants, MacShara and Rudzewicz, filed a motion to dismiss the case on the argument as Michigan residents, the District Court of Southern Florida did not have jurisdiction. After a hearing, the Court ruled that Florida has personal jurisdiction under State of Florida's long-arm statute, (Note: § 48.193(1)(g) (Supp. 1984) of the Florida Statutes) stating that "... a non-resident Burger King franchise is subject to the personal jurisdiction of this Court in actions arising out of its franchise agreements". The partners filed a counter claim and alleged Burger King had violated Michigan's Franchise Investment Law and sought damages and fees. (Note: § 445.1501 et se. (1979) of the Michigan Statutes) After a short trial, the Court found for Burger King and ordered Rudzewicz and MacShara to close the restaurant and awarded Burger King damages, fees, and costs.

After the loss, MacShara withdrew from the case but Rudzewicz appealed the decision to the United States Court of Appeals for the Eleventh Circuit. (Note: Teply, p. 247 – MacShara did not appeal his judgement ...) In the filing, Rudzewicz claimed that since they were residents of Michigan, and because the claims did not arise within the Southern District of Florida, that District Court lacked personal jurisdiction over them. Additionally Rudzewicz argued that the long-arm statute violated the 14th Amendment and was unconstitutional. Citing a similar case, World-Wide Volkswagen Corp. v. Woodson, the Appeals court agreed with the defendants and overturned the lower court's decision. The court also agreed with Rudzewicz's assertion of the constitutionality of Florida's long arm statute in its application to the case.

In turn, Burger King Corporation asked for a rehearing, which was denied. Burger King then filed an appeal to the US Supreme Court, which agreed to hear the case on its merits, after which it would decide if it had jurisdiction to grant a writ of certiorari. (Note: 105 S.Ct. 77, (US FL OCT 1, 1984) (Mem)) In its decision, the Supreme Court overturned the Appellate Court and found that Florida does have jurisdiction in the case. The Court concluded that the defendants, Rudzewicz and MacShara, sought out their franchise in the state of Florida and were availed of the protections of that state and were, therefore, subject to jurisdiction there. Additionally, the Court reasoned that the defendants had a "substantial and continuing" relationship with Burger King in Florida and that due process would not be violated because the defendants should have reasonably anticipated being summoned into court in Florida for breach of contract.

The decision in Burger King Corp. v. Rudzewicz, has been criticized as complicating "personal jurisdiction jurisprudence by creating, in dicta, a new bifurcated test" that duplicates a venue analysis, adds little to the minimum contacts inquiry, hinders predictability, is a burdensome process, and potentially allows a plaintiff to manipulate a defendant's constitutional rights.

=== Burger King of Florida, Inc. v. Hoots ===
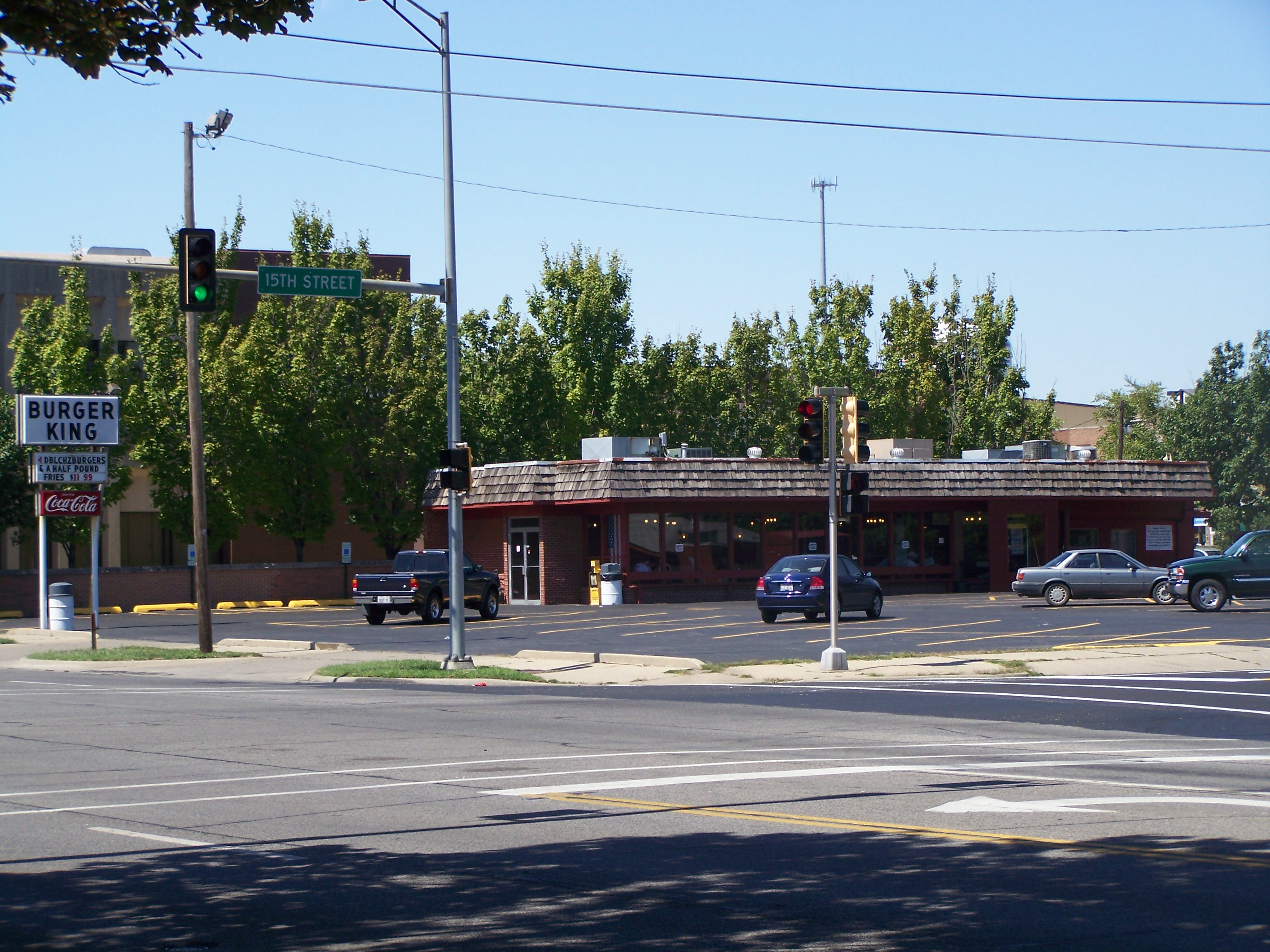
The Hoots' family Burger King restaurant on the corner of Charleston Ave. and Fifteenth St. in Mattoon, Illinois

As the company expanded, it was subject to several legal issues regarding trademarks. Because of its use as a case study in American law schools, one of the most prominent incidents of infringement in the United States occurred with the similarly named Burger King located in Mattoon, Illinois. Eugene and Elizabeth Hoots owned an ice cream shop in the city of Mattoon; due to the success of the store, in 1957 they expanded it with an additional shop in a former garage next to the original operation. Keeping with theme related to the name of the ice cream shop, Frigid Queen, they named their burger stand Burger King and registered their trademark with the state of Illinois in 1959. In 1962 The Hootses, with knowledge of the Federal trademark held by Burger King Corporation, added a second location in Charleston, Illinois.

In 1961, with its first location in Skokie, Illinois, Burger King Corporation and its franchises began opening stores and by 1967 had over 20 locations spread throughout the state. The Hootses, claiming that their trademark gave them exclusive rights to the name in Illinois sued BK in the state, and later federal, courts under the case Burger King of Florida, Inc. v. Hoots 403 F.2d 904 (7th Cir. 1968). The decision issued by United States District Court for the Central District of Illinois, and upheld by the United States Court of Appeals for the Seventh Circuit, stated that the BK federal trademark, applied for in 1961 and granted in 1963, took precedence over the Hootses' older, state trademark; The Court granted the Hootses exclusive rights to the Burger King trademark within a circular area defined with a 20-mile (32 km) radius centered on their original location. (Note: 403 F.2d 904 – The district court defined the Mattoon market area as a circle having a radius of twenty miles and a center located at the defendants' place of business in Mattoon, Illinois) (Note: 403 F.2d 904 – The court cited numerous examples where the federal law explicitly gave federal trademarks stronger weight than other kinds. See, for example, 15 U.S.C. § 1127: "The intent of this chapter is ... to protect registered marks used in such commerce from interference by State, or territorial legislation.")

The Burger King v. Hoots trademark dispute and its resulting decision went beyond the original case, it established a major legal precedent in the United States in regards to the Lanham Act. The ruling states that while the senior user of the state service mark or trademark has prior usage of the common law marks, federal statute overrides the earlier, state service mark and prohibits the senior user from preventing the junior user from exercising the use of the federally registered mark outside a defined geographic reach of the senior user.

The Hoots decision would again affect Burger King as it moved into the state of Texas. (Note: Barkoff – p. 23, footnote 85) When Burger King expanded into the San Antonio area, it was prevented from utilizing the name of its signature product, the Whopper, in its local advertising and stores due to a prior state registered service mark owned by a local chain known as Whopper Burger. The chain, owned by Frank and Barbara Bates, prevented the company from using the name in Bexar County for several years until Mrs. Bates, the CEO of Whopper Burger after the death of her husband in 1983, retired and sold the chain with its related trademarks to then-corporate parent Pillsbury in the mid-1980s.

== See also ==
- Scheck v. Burger King Corp.
- Burger King franchises
- Hungry Jack's
- McDonald's legal cases
