= Burger King (disambiguation) =

Burger King is a major international fast food restaurant chain and corporation.

Burger King may also refer to:

- Burger King (mascot), mascot of the major fast food restaurant chain
- Burger King (Mattoon, Illinois), a single location fast food restaurant unaffiliated with the major corporation
- Burger King (Alberta), a defunct fast food chain unaffiliated with the major corporation

== See also ==
- Burger Kings
- Burger Queen
