= McDonald's legal cases =

Lawsuits involving the fast food chain

McDonald's has been involved in a number of lawsuits and other legal cases in the course of the fast food chain's 70-year history. Many of these have involved trademark issues, most of which involving the "Mc" prefix, but McDonald's has also launched a defamation suit which has been described as "the biggest corporate PR disaster in history".

== Partnership suits ==
=== El Salvador ===
In 1996, McDonald's revoked businessman Roberto Bukele's franchise for his restaurants in El Salvador. McDonald's told Bukele the franchise he had operated for 24 years had expired and wouldn't be renewed. Bukele, who had a 1994 agreement that he believed extended the franchise to 2014, refused to close or rebrand his restaurants.

McDonald's won in the lower courts, but appellate courts sided with Bukele and eventually in 2012 McDonald's was ordered to pay a $23.9 million judgment to Bukele.

Bukele alleged that he never received the $23.9 million judgment and has filed a new demand in court for $21 million in interest on the award.

=== McDonald's India – Vikram Bakshi partnership case ===
On 30 August 2013, McDonald's published a public notice in select newspapers, declaring that McDonald's India partner Vikram Bakshi had ceased to be the managing director of Connaught Plaza Restaurants (CPRL) pursuant to the expiration of his term on July 17, 2013. CPRL was a joint venture between McDonald's and Vikram Bakshi, and was responsible for managing the over 150 McDonald's outlets in North and East regions of India. Bakshi had been the face of the company in India for almost two decades. After being ousted abruptly, Bakshi sought to fight for his stake and rights before the Company Law Board (CLB). Bakshi said he brought over ₹490 crore (US$83.62 million) worth of revenue for the American food chain. McDonald's sought to buy the 50% share in CPRL held by Bakshi and his wife for ₹120 crore (US$20.48 million), whereas Bakshi sought ₹1,800 crore (US$307.18 million) for the same. Bakshi accused Amit Jatia, who manages the chain in West and South India under Hardcastle Restaurants, of instigating McDonald's. McDonald's had sold their 50% share of the Hardcastle Restaurants joint venture to Jatia at a reported loss of 99% in 2011, making it a master franchisee.

The court is under the ambit of CLB with hearing beginning in early October 2013. In 2017, the National Company Law Tribunal (the successor of the CLB) reinstated Bakshi as managing director of Connaught Plaza Restaurants. In 2019, Bakshi and McDonald's reached a settlement where McDonald's would buy Bakshi share in CPRL for an undisclosed amount and become the sole owner.

== Defamation ==
=== McLibel (UK) ===
In 1990, McDonald's took environmental campaigners Helen Steel and Dave Morris to court after they distributed leaflets entitled What's Wrong with McDonald's? on the streets of London. The high-profile trial, which came to be known as the McLibel Case, lasted nearly ten years, the longest in English legal history.

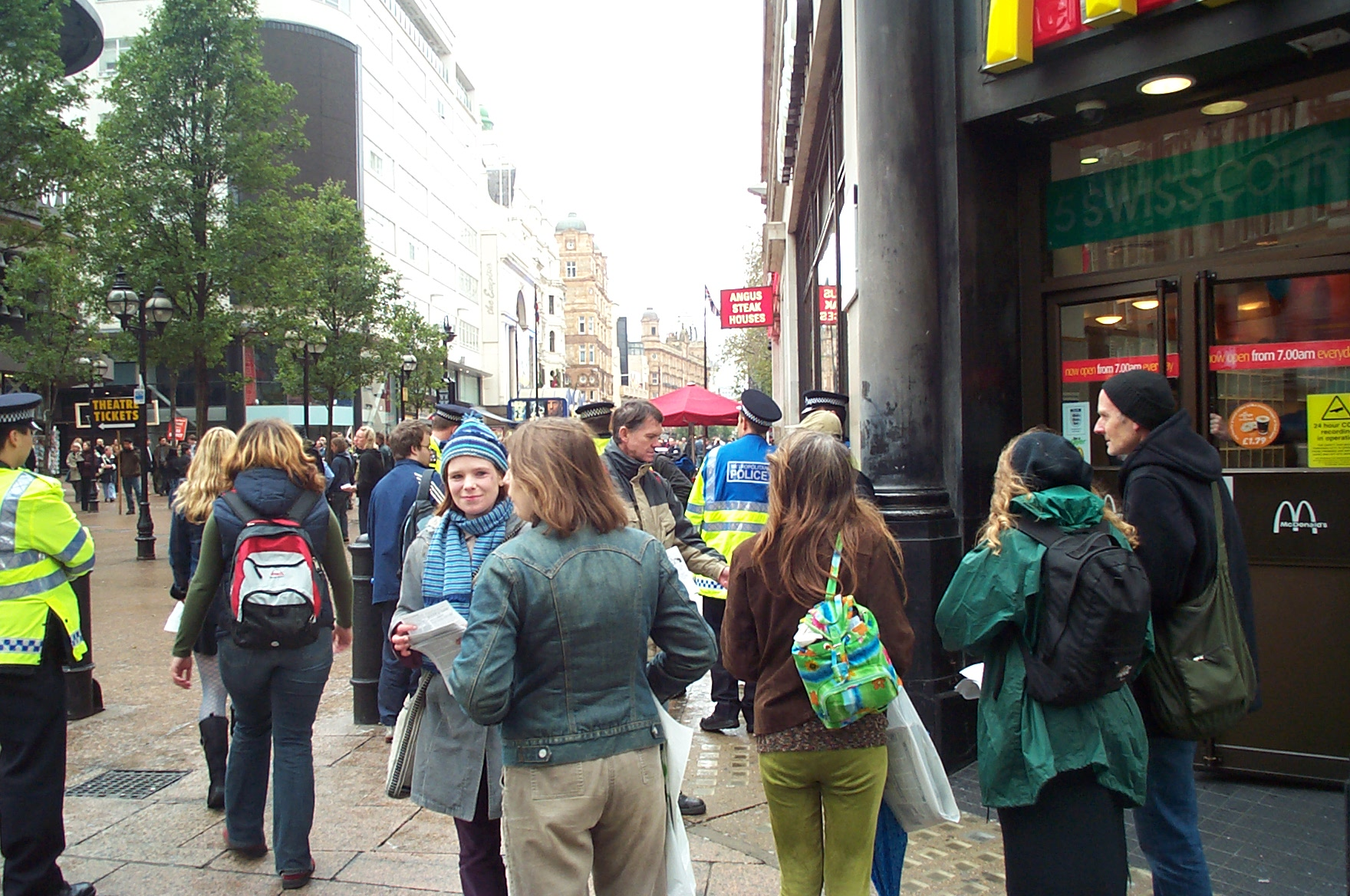
An anti-McDonald's leafletting campaign in front of the McDonald's restaurant in Leicester Square, London, during the European Social Forum season, 2004-10-16

Though a High Court judge eventually ruled in favour of McDonald's on some counts, The Guardian environmental editor John Vidal called it a Pyrrhic victory. The extended legal battle was a PR disaster, with every aspect of the company's working practices being scrutinised and the media presenting the case as a David and Goliath battle. Additionally, the damages received were negligible compared to the company's estimated £10 million legal costs because the court ruled in favour of a number of the defendants' claims, including that McDonald's exploited children in its advertising, was anti-trade union and indirectly exploited and caused suffering to animals. McDonald's was awarded £60,000 damages, which was later reduced to £40,000 by the Court of Appeal. Steel and Morris announced they had no intention of ever paying, and the company later confirmed it would not be pursuing the money. Steel and Morris went on to challenge UK libel laws in the European Court of Human Rights, claiming that the lack of access to legal aid and the heavy burden of proof that lay with them, as the defendants' requirement to prove their claims under UK law was a breach of the right to a fair trial and freedom of expression. The court ruled in their favour.

== Intellectual property ==
=== MacJoy (Philippines) ===
In 2004, McDonald's sued Cebu-based fast food restaurant MacJoy for using a very similar trade name. In its defense, MacJoy insisted that it was the first user of the mark under the title "MACJOY & DEVICE" for its business in Cebu City which started in 1987, whereas McDonald's only opened its first outlet in the same city in 1992, although it had used the name in Manila since 1971. MacJoy stated that the requirement of "actual use" in commerce in the Philippines before one may register a trademark pertains to the territorial jurisdiction on a national scale and is not merely confined to a certain locality or region. It added that "MacJoy" is a term of endearment for the owner's niece whose name is Scarlett Yu Carcel. In response, McDonald's claimed that there was no connection with the name Scarlett Yu Carcel to merit the coinage of the word "MacJoy" and that the only logical conclusion over the name is to help the Cebu restaurant ride high on their (McDonald's) established reputation.

In February 2007, the Philippine Supreme Court upheld the right of McDonald's over its registered and internationally recognized trademarks. As a result, the owners of MacJoy, the Espina family, was forced to change its trademark into MyJoy, which went into effect with the re-opening of its two branches in Cebu City in August that year.

=== McCoffee (US) ===
In 1994, McDonald's successfully forced Elizabeth McCaughey of the San Francisco Bay Area to change the trading name of her coffee shop McCoffee, which had operated under that name for 17 years. "This is the moment I surrendered the little 'c' to corporate America," said Ms. McCaughey, who had named it as an adaptation of her surname.

=== Norman McDonald's Country Drive-Inn (US) ===
From the early 1960s to the mid-1980s, Norman McDonald ran a small "Country Drive-Inn" restaurant in Philpot, Kentucky, called simply "McDonald's Hamburgers; Country Drive-Inn", which at the time also had a gas station and convenience store. McDonald's the restaurant chain tried to get the removal of McDonalds from Norman but Norman fought and won the right to keep his last name on his front sign but had to add the full Norman McDonald's name to its sign so customers would not be confused into thinking the restaurant was affiliated with the McDonald's restaurant chain. The restaurant is still open to this day (though it no longer has the gas station).

=== McChina Wok Away (UK) ===
In 2001, McDonald's lost a nine-year legal action against Frank Yuen, owner of McChina Wok Away, a small chain of Chinese takeaway outlets in London. Justice David Neuberger ruled the McChina name would not cause any confusion among customers and that McDonald's had no right to the prefix Mc.

=== McMunchies (UK) ===
In 1996, McDonald's forced Scottish sandwich shop owner Mary Blair of Fenny Stratford, Buckinghamshire to drop McMunchies as her trading name. Mrs. Blair did not sell burgers or chips. She said she chose the name because she liked the word munchies and wanted the cafe to have a Scottish feel. The cafe's sign reflected this, featuring a Scottish thistle and a St Andrew's flag. But in a statement to Mrs. Blair's solicitors, McDonald's said if someone used the Mc prefix, even unintentionally, they were using something that does not belong to them.

=== MacDonald's (Cayman Islands) ===
An often reported urban legend maintains that McDonald's filed a lawsuit against MacDonald's Family Restaurant, an actual fast food establishment located in the Cayman Islands. This false claim alleges that McDonald's lost the case, and in addition, was banned from ever opening a McDonald's location in the country. While it is true that no McDonald's locations exist on the island, the reason is not due to any lawsuit against MacDonald's Family Restaurant.

=== McAllan (Denmark) ===
In 1996, McDonald's lost a legal battle at the Danish Supreme Court to force Allan Pedersen, a hotdog vendor, to drop his shop name McAllan. Pedersen had previously visited Scotland on whisky tasting tours. He named his business after his favorite brand of whisky, MacAllan's, after contacting the distillery to see if they would object. They did not, but McDonald's did. However, the court ruled customers could tell the difference between a one-man vendor and a multi-national chain and ordered McDonald's to pay 40,000 kroner ($6,900) in court costs. The verdict cannot be appealed.

=== McCurry (Malaysia) ===
In 2001, McDonald's sued a small restaurant named McCurry, a popular eatery serving Indian food in Jalan Ipoh, Kuala Lumpur, Malaysia. McDonald's claimed that the use of the "Mc" prefix infringed its trademark, while the defendant claimed that McCurry stood for Malaysian Chicken Curry.

In 2006, McDonald's won an initial judgment in the High Court. The judge ruled that the prefix Mc and the use of colours distinctive of the McDonald's brand could confuse and deceive customers. In April 2009, however, a three-member Appeal Court panel overturned the verdict, saying that there was no evidence to show that McCurry was passing off its own product as that of McDonald's. The Appeals Court also said that McDonald's cannot claim an exclusive right to the "Mc" prefix in the country. McDonald's appealed the decision to the Federal Court, the highest court in Malaysia. In September 2009, the Federal Court upheld the Appeal Court's decision. McDonald's appeal was dismissed with costs, and the company was ordered to pay RM 10,000 to McCurry.

=== South African trademark law ===
Apartheid politics had prevented earlier expansion into South Africa, but as the apartheid regime came to an end in the early 1990s, McDonald's decided to expand there. The company had already recognized South Africa as a potentially significant market and had registered its name as a trademark there in 1968.

Under South African law, trademarks cease to be the property of a company if they are not used for a certain amount of time. McDonald's had renewed the 1968 registration several times, but missed a renewal deadline. The registration expired and McDonald's discovered two fast food restaurants in South Africa were trading under the name MacDonalds. Moreover, a businessman had applied to register the McDonald's name.

Multiple lawsuits were filed. The fast food chain was stunned when the court ruled it had lost the rights to its world-famous name in South Africa. However, the company eventually won on appeal.

=== McDonald's Family Restaurant (US) ===
The company first wrote to McDonald's Family Restaurant, which opened in 1956 in Fairbury, Illinois and is run by a man whose real name is Ronald McDonald in 1970 to warn against the restaurant "ever using arches or going to a drive-in format". Over the next 26-years, the company would send 33 more letters and make several phone calls. After unspecified "legal wranglings" the restaurant entered into a settlement agreement and non-disclosure agreement, allegedly in exchange for enough money to purchase a "top-of-the-line luxury car--and they threw in a new sign to boot".

=== The McBrat case (Australia) ===
In 2005, McDonald's tried to stop a Queensland lawyer, Malcolm McBratney, from using the name 'McBrat' on the shorts of the Brisbane Irish Rugby team. McDonald's claimed the McBrat name should not be registered because it was too similar to its McKids trade mark, since the word 'brat' is another term for 'kid'. McBratney argued that his family name had been used in Ireland since the 1600s, and that he had a right to use an abbreviation of that name. In 2006, the Delegate of the Register of Trade Marks held that McBratney could register 'McBrat' as a trademark and that McDonald's had no intellectual property rights over 'Mc' and 'Mac' prefixed words.

=== Big Jack (Australia) ===
In 2020, McDonald's sued Australian Burger King franchise Hungry Jack's over their new "Big Jack" burger, which was a slightly altered version of Burger King's Big King and similar to McDonald's own Big Mac. The close similarities in the name, appearance and the marketing of the Big Jack led to McDonald's suing Hungry Jack's in the Federal Court of Australia in August 2020 over trademark infringement, and they sought to cancel Hungry Jack's Big Jack trademark which was filed the previous year. They also accused the company of deliberately copying the ingredients and appearance of the Big Mac in bad faith. In its defence, Hungry Jack's argued that the burger's name is simply a play on the company's name and that of its founder Jack Cowin, and that a burger's appearance and composition cannot be protected by a trademark, noting that their product features "common characteristics of hamburgers" sold everywhere. However the company also admitted there was an "element of cheekiness" in the name, and that it was positioned as a direct competitor to the Big Mac. In November 2023, the Federal Court ruled against McDonald's, finding that "Big Jack is not deceptively similar to Big Mac", and that the company had not established that Hungry Jack's trademarks had infringed on McDonald's existing trademarks. The Big Jack and all its variants had been previously removed from Hungry Jack's menu in late 2021, though it later returned as a limited time item after the suit was resolved.

=== Cases brought against McDonald's ===
==== H.R. Pufnstuf / Mcdonaldland ====
In 1973, Sid and Marty Krofft, the creators of H.R. Pufnstuf, successfully sued McDonald's in Sid & Marty Krofft Television Productions Inc. v. McDonald's Corp., arguing that the entire McDonaldland premise was essentially a ripoff of their television show. In specific, the Kroffts claimed that the character Mayor McCheese was a direct copy of their character, "H.R. Pufnstuf" (being a mayor himself). McDonald's initially was ordered to pay $50,000. The case was later remanded as to damages, and McDonald's was ordered to pay the Kroffts more than $1 million.

McDonaldland itself, as it was depicted in the commercials, was a magical place where plants, foods, and inanimate objects were living, speaking characters. In addition to being the home to Ronald and the other core characters, McDonaldland boasted "Thick shake volcanoes", anthropomorphized "Apple pie trees", "The Hamburger Patch" (where McDonald's hamburgers grew out of the ground like plants), "Filet-O-Fish Lake", and many other fanciful features based around various McDonald's menu items. In the commercials, the various beings are played by puppets or costumed performers, very similar to the popular H.R. Pufnstuf program.

McDonald's had originally hoped the Kroffts would agree to license its characters for commercial promotions. When they declined, McDonaldland was created, purposely based on the H.R. Pufnstuf show in an attempt to duplicate the appeal.

After the lawsuit, the concept of the "magical place" was all but phased out of the commercials, as were many of the original characters. Those that remained would be Ronald, Grimace, Birdie, The Hamburglar, and the Fry Kids.

==== McSleep (Quality Inns International) ====
In 1988, Quality Inns (now Choice Hotels) was planning to open a new chain of economy hotels under the name "McSleep." After McDonald's demanded that Quality Inns not use the name because it infringed, the hotel company filed a suit in federal court seeking a declaratory judgment that "McSleep" did not infringe. McDonald's counterclaimed, alleging trademark infringement and unfair competition. Linguist Roger Shuy testified for Quality Inn, that "the Mc prefix had become part of everyday English"; David Lightfoot argued for McDonald's that in all those cases these meanings "were characteristics of McDonald's and its reputation". Eventually, McDonald's prevailed. The court's opinion noted that the prefix "Mc" added to a generic word has acquired secondary meaning, so that in the eyes of the public it means McDonald's, and therefore the name "McSleep" would infringe on McDonald's trademarks.

==== Viz top tips (UK) ====
In 1996, British adult comic Viz accused McDonald's of plagiarizing the name and format of its longstanding Top Tips feature, in which readers offer sarcastic tips. McDonald's had created an advertising campaign of the same name, which showcased the Top Tips (and then suggested the money-saving alternative – going to McDonald's). Some of the similarities were almost word-for-word:

"Save a fortune on laundry bills. Give your dirty shirts to Oxfam. They will wash and iron them, and then you can buy them back for 50p." – Viz Top Tip, published May 1989.

"Save a fortune on laundry bills. Give your dirty shirts to a second-hand shop. They will wash and iron them, and then you can buy them back for 50p." – McDonald's advert, 1996

The case was settled out of court for an undisclosed sum, which was donated to the charity appeal Comic Relief. However, many Viz readers believed that the comic had given permission for their use, leading to Top Tips submissions such as: "Geordie magazine editors. Continue paying your mortgage and buying expensive train sets ... by simply licensing the Top Tips concept to a multinational burger corporation."

== Labor ==
=== Coalition of Immokalee workers (US) ===
In March 2001, the Coalition of Immokalee Workers, a group of South Florida farmworkers, began a campaign demanding better wages for the people who pick the tomatoes used by McDonald's and other fast food companies. McDonald's was the second target after the group succeeded against Taco Bell.

=== Strip search suit (US) ===
McDonald's is one of several businesses where someone claiming to be a police officer telephoned the business, and convinced the manager to conduct a strip search of an employee.

== Advertisements ==
=== Happy Meals and Toys (Quebec, Canada) ===
On November 14, 2018, the Superior Court of Quebec certified Bramante v. McDonald Restaurants as a class action on behalf of all consumers worldwide who purchased Happy Meals and Toys in the province of Quebec. The plaintiffs alleged—and the Court agreed at certification—that McDonald's violated section 248 of the Quebec Consumer Protection Act by unlawfully advertising Happy Meals using displays with toys (often related to the newest cinematic release) at children's eye-level inside McDonald's restaurants. Section 248 provides that: "Subject to what is provided in the regulations, no person may make use of commercial advertising directed at persons under thirteen years of age". The Court certified the case on behalf of the following class: "Every consumer pursuant to the Québec Consumer Protection Act who, since November 15, 2013 purchased in Québec for a child under 13 years of age then present inside a McDonald's restaurant, a toy or Happy Meal, during an advertising campaign directed at children taking place inside the restaurant". The class action seeks injunctive relief ordering McDonald's to cease marketing to children under 13 years old with its Happy Meal displays, reimbursement of Happy Meal and individual toy sales, as well as punitive damages in amounts to be determined. The case was initially filed on November 15, 2013, by Quebec class action attorney Joey Zukran of LPC Avocat Inc.

=== Fries advertisement (UK) ===
In 2003, a ruling by the UK Advertising Standards Authority determined that the corporation had acted in breach of the codes of practice in describing how its French fries were prepared. A McDonald's print ad stated that "after selecting certain potatoes", "we peel them, slice them, fry them and that's it." It showed a picture of a potato in a McDonald's fries box. In fact, the product was sliced, pre-fried, sometimes had dextrose added, was then frozen, shipped, and re-fried and then had salt added.

=== Beef content in hamburgers ===
Lawsuits were brought against the McDonald's Corporation in the early 1990s for including beef in its US French fries despite claims that the fries were vegetarian. In fact, beef flavoring is added to the fries during the production phase. The case revolved around a 1990 McDonald's press release stating that the company's French fries would be cooked in 100% vegetable oil and a 1993 letter to a customer that claimed their French fries are vegetarian. McDonald's denied this. The lawsuits ended in 2002 when McDonald's announced it would issue another apology and pay $10M to vegetarians and religious groups. Subsequent oversight by the courts was required to ensure that the money that was paid by McDonald's: "to use the funds for programs serving the interests of people following vegetarian dietary practices in the broadest sense." There was some controversy in this ruling, as it benefited non-vegetarian groups such as research institutions that research vegetarian diets but do not benefit vegetarians. In 2005, the appeal filed by vegetarians against the list of recipients, in this case, was denied, and the recipients of the $10M chosen by McDonald's was upheld.

Further ingredient-related lawsuits have been brought against McDonald's since 2006. McDonald's had included its French fries on its website in a list of gluten-free products; these lawsuits claim children suffered severe intestinal damage as a result of unpublicized changes to McDonald's French fry recipe. McDonald's has provided a more complete ingredient list for its French fries more recently. Over 20 lawsuits have been brought against McDonald's regarding this issue, which the McDonald's Corporation has attempted to consolidate.

=== "McMatch and Win Monopoly" promotion (Australia) ===
In 2001, 34 claimants (representing some 7,000 claimants) filed a class action lawsuit against McDonald's for false and misleading conduct arising from the "McMatch & Win Monopoly" promotion before Justice John Dowsett of the Federal Court of Australia. The claimants had attempted to claim prizes from the 1999 promotion using game tokens from the 1998 promotion, arguing unsuccessfully that the remaining 1998 tokens may have been distributed accidentally by McDonald's in 1999.

=== Halal food lawsuit (Dearborn, Michigan) ===
In 2013, McDonald's stopped serving halal food, which is consistent with Islamic dietary laws, at the only two locations in the US that served halal food, both located in Dearborn, Michigan after a $700,000 lawsuit filed in 2001 where a customer alleged the menu items were not consistently halal. The case was brought to court by Michael Jaafar, a Detroit lawyer of Fairmax Law who filed a consumer protection class action lawsuit against McDonald's for advertising halal foods.

=== Byron Allen non-purchase lawsuit (United States) ===
In 2025, McDonald's settled a years-old lawsuit from Allen Media Group in which owner Byron Allen had accused McDonald's of illegally refusing to buy airtime on Allen's Entertainment Studios Networks programming. The settlement involves McDonald's being required to purchase airtime on Allen's programs.

== Health and safety ==
=== United States ===
Also known as the "McDonald's coffee case", Liebeck v. McDonald's is a well-known product liability lawsuit that became a flash point in the debate in the U.S. over tort reform after a jury awarded $2.9 million to Stella Liebeck, a 79-year-old woman from Albuquerque, New Mexico, who sued McDonald's after she suffered third-degree burns from hot coffee that was spilled on her at one of the company's drive-thrus in 1992. The trial judge reduced the total award to $640,000, and the parties settled for a confidential amount before an appeal was decided.

The case entered popular understanding as an example of frivolous litigation; ABC News calls the case "the poster child of excessive lawsuits." Trial-lawyer groups such as the Association of Trial Lawyers of America and other opponents of tort reform sometimes argue that the suit was justified because of the extent of Liebeck's injuries, as the coffee in question was at a temperature too hot for human consumption which McDonald's failed to provide proper warning. Warning consumers of possible dangers of their products is strictly enforced by the FDA. Furthermore, McDonald's should not be serving substances that are potentially harmful to their consumers.

On May 10, 2023, a verdict rendered by a jury found that McDonald's and a franchise holder were held responsible for the injuries sustained by Olivia Carballo, a four-year-old who suffered second-degree burns from a McNugget. A jury awarded the family $800,000.

=== China ===
In July 2014, a reporter was able to secretly capture film from inside the Shanghai Husi Food factory (a subsidiary of the American OSI group) which showed factory workers violating various safety policies. These included: handling meat with bare hands, picking meat up off the floor and returning it to the processing machine, processing expired meats, and repeatedly reprocessing products that failed inspection until the said products passed inspection. After the video surfaced, Yum Brands (operator of KFC and Pizza Hut in China) discontinued its operations with Husi Foods (and thus OSI Group). However, McDonald's merely switched factories, preferring to continue their association with OSI Group as they believe the quality of meat is higher and this was an isolated incident.

=== Peru ===
On December 15, 2019, two teenage employees died when they were doing cleaning chores in a McDonald's restaurant in Pueblo Libre district, Lima. They, who were working at dawn outside the hours indicated in their contract, had contact with a beverage vending machine in poor condition, which produced an electric shock that, added to the wet floor and the lack of adequate cleaning implements, caused their death. Arcos Dorados Holdings, McDonald's parent company in Peru and Latin America, was sued by the families of both young people for labor exploitation, safety deficiencies and negligence, as it became known that the workers had reported the machine's failures, but managers ignored that, in addition to that employees had not been trained to face an event such as an electric shock. All Peruvian restaurantes closed for some days in memory of two employees. After a fine imposed by the National Superintendency of Labor Inspection (SUNAFIL) and an out-of-court settlement with the bereaved families, which amounts exceeding $300,000, the case was archived in September 2020, although three months later the investigation was resumed. The restaurant where the events occurred closed permanently in November 2020, although it had been closed since the incident.

== Discrimination ==
=== Accessibility ===
Magee v. McDonald's is a United States federal class action lawsuit begun in May 2016 in the Illinois Northern District Court, case number 1:16-cv-05652, in which Scott Magee of Metairie, Louisiana is pursuing action against McDonald's due to the company being unwilling to serve people who are visually impaired when only the drive thru lane is open. Because the drive thru lane is sometimes the only method of ordering food once the dining room is closed, this creates a situation in which people who are legally blind, and unable to operate a motor vehicle can not order food from the restaurant while other people are able to do so.

Magee has limited vision, because of macular degeneration, which started at age 16, and has become progressively worse. He can walk without a cane, but his central vision is insufficient for driving.

McDonald's attempted to get the case dismissed, but in February 2017, a federal court ruled that Magee's lawsuit could proceed. On May 8, 2018, the class was certified.

In August 2018, McDonald's argued that the restaurant was operated by a franchisee, and that the McDonald's corporation did not control the locking of doors. In October 2018, McDonald's argued that the restaurant was accessible, because a blind person could obtain food "through the same UberEats delivery service that everyone else uses," even though it would cost $5.00 extra.

On October 31, 2018, McDonald's filed a document with the court, arguing that because the restaurants forbid any pedestrian access to their drive-up window, they are not discriminating against the blind. McDonald's says a blind person has "the same access as the 13 million adults who are not visually impaired and do not have a car, and that therefore the ADA does not apply." In March 2019, arguments in court papers continued about the definition of "meaningful access."

Meanwhile, on May 24, 2018, a law came into effect in Portland, Oregon requiring multi-modal access to drive-throughs.

The McDonald's case was mentioned in a June 2019 article about a similar problem with Wendy's evening service.

On October 5, 2021, United States District Judge John F. Kness granted a summary judgement dismissing the action against McDonald's. Judge Kness found that individual franchisees operate the restaurants, not McDonald's USA. Also discrimination was against pedestrians, not against the disabled.

=== Racial harassment ===
On 1 September 2020, McDonald's was sued by 50 black owners for racial discrimination. According to the lawsuit, McDonald's steered black franchisees to stores which had lower revenue and higher security expenses than stores in more affluent areas.

On 16 February 2021, franchise owner and former professional athlete Herbert Washington filed a lawsuit in Youngstown, Ohio alleging the McDonald's discriminatory practices prevented Black franchisees from buying franchises in affluent areas. The lawsuit read in part:

"By relegating Black owners to the oldest stores in the toughest neighborhoods, McDonald's ensured that Black franchisees would never achieve the levels of success that White franchisees could expect. Black franchisees must spend more to operate their stores while White franchisees get to realize the full benefit of their labors."

Washington's lawsuit asserts that the number of Black McDonald's franchise owners in 2020 is 186, compared with 377 in 1998.

=== Sexual harassment ===
On January 25, 2023, the Delaware Court of Chancery ruled that McDonald's former global chief people officer could be sued by shareholders who accused him of allowing a "culture of sexual misconduct and harassment to develop" at the company, clarifying that "corporate officers owe a duty of oversight". This landmark decision represented the first time that Delaware courts had explicitly recognized an officer-level fiduciary duty of oversight. The stockholders in this derivative lawsuit are represented by lawyers from Grant & Eisenhofer P.A., Scott + Scott Attorneys at Law LLP, and Newman Ferrara LLP.

In 2024, a supervisor at Taiwan McDonald's was alleged to have sexually assaulted a teenager since 2023. The teenager later committed suicide. In December 2024, Taipei's Department of Labor imposed an NT$1 million fine for the incident. McDonald's issued a "sincerest apology" and stated that they have been investigating the case since March 2024, when the teenager reported. The incident is under criminal investigation in 2025. Some people boycotted McDonald's for the incident have caused backlash among some Taiwanese students, who went to McDonald's to celebrate "a world without feminists". Zhuang Fu-Tai (莊福泰), the principal of Kaohsiung Municipal Kaohsiung Senior High School, criticised the backlash as the result of understanding society by reading short-form content merely.

== See also ==
- Burger King legal issues
