= CollegeSource, Inc. v. AcademyOne, Inc. =

American legal proceeding

- Court: United States Court of Appeals for the Ninth Circuit
- Full case name: CollegeSource, Inc. v. AcademyOne, Inc.
- Argued: October 8, 2010
- Citation: 653 F.3d 1066

Court membership
- Judges sitting: Kim McLane Wardlaw, William A. Fletcher, and Barbara M. Lynn

CollegeSource, Inc. v. AcademyOne, Inc., 653 F.3d 1066 (9th Cir. 2011), was a United States legal case in which CollegeSource sued AcademyOne for a number of claims including the Computer Fraud and Abuse Act (CFAA).

The case was dismissed by Judge Gonzalo P. Curiel on September 24, 2015, clearing AcademyOne of any wrongdoing. CollegeSource appealed the 9th Circuit District Court's dismissal to the United States Court of Appeals for the Ninth Circuit, which unanimously affirmed the lower Court's decision on September 15, 2017.

Prior to summary judgement and its affirmation, the United States Court of Appeals for the Ninth Circuit ruled that AcademyOne was subject to specific personal jurisdiction in California, but not general personal jurisdiction. The court then remanded the case to the District Court for the Southern District of California for further proceedings.

== Background ==
CollegeSource and AcademyOne are competitors in the market that helps prospective students with the college transfer process. CollegeSource maintain its principal place of business in California, while AcademyOne maintained its principal place of business in Pennsylvania. However, both companies seek to serve the transfer market online not bound by state or region. Important to the appeal, AcademyOne targeted prospective transfer students by state through use of Google AdWords, solicited California colleges and state educational agencies through phone and email, and sponsored the keynote speaker at a conference held for the benefit of higher education executive officers meeting in San Diego.

CollegeSource claimed to own and copyright a digital collection of 44,000 course catalogs from 3,000 colleges, worth allegedly $10 million. The complete digital collection was available through subscription as .pdf files on CollegeSource's websites. Known to CollegeSource, many of the .pdf files were also individually distributed across thousands of institutional websites. AcademyOne, a few months after its founding, made several attempts to inquire about CollegeSource's collection of course catalogs as it researched how to compile a nationwide database of college and university level courses to support its college transfer websites. At least three employees registered for trial membership with CollegeSource that allowed them to download three sample catalogs each. CollegeSource declined AcademyOne's early attempts to partner to keep its competitive advantage in the market place.

Therefore, AcademyOne decided to collect and build its own collection of college and university catalogs to harvest the course information. AcademyOne hired a China-based contractor to collect the catalogs and mine the course descriptions from the files or web pages. The contractor collected over 18,000 .pdf files and thousands of html pages containing course descriptions from a list of schools' websites that AcademyOne had provided. During this process, the contractor collected roughly 680 .pdf files that contained CollegeSource's splash page and copyright page. CollegeSource also claimed some courses descriptions displayed on AcademyOne's websites were mined and traceable to CollegeSource's electronic catalog versions because they supposedly contained typographical errors and "seeds" introduced by the digitization and conversion effort from years prior. Moreover, some of the course catalog pdf files included a page terms prohibiting redistribution, modification, or commercial use of the catalogs without consent of CollegeSource) on the second page of the .pdf.

In April 2007, CollegeSource sent AcademyOne a cease-and-desist letter to stop using CollegeSource's college catalogs and the mined course descriptions based upon copyright and ownership claims. AcademyOne removed public access to the catalog files and course descriptions after they received the letter. However, CollegeSource later refuted this claim. CollegeSource submitted that AcademyOne left copies of CollegeSource's catalogs on AcademyOne's server for weeks and continued to keep copies of the course description on AcademyOne's website while they researched CollegeSource's claims.

== Holding ==
The court held that AcademyOne was not subject to general personal jurisdiction. Instead, the court held that AcademyOne was subject to specific personal jurisdiction in California and remanded the case to the District Court for the Southern District of California for further proceedings.

== Personal jurisdiction ==
In the inquiry for a dismissal for lack personal jurisdiction, CollegeSource bore the burden of establishing that jurisdiction by making a primae facie showing that the facts established that AcademyOne was subject to personal jurisdiction in California. Therefore, CollegeSource must show that AcademyOne was subject to either general personal jurisdiction or specific personal jurisdiction. For general personal jurisdiction to exist, CollegeSource must have shown that AcademyOne engaged in "continuous and systematic general business contacts". On the other hand, specific personal jurisdiction is analyzed under a three-part test: (1) AcademyOne must have purposefully availed itself, (2) the claim must be one which relates to the related activities, (3) the exercise of jurisdiction must comport with fair play and substantial justice.

=== General jurisdiction ===
The court ruled that AcademyOne was not subject to general personal jurisdiction in California. The court noted that AcademyOne was not registered to do business in California and did not pay state taxes. Furthermore, the court reasoned that AcademyOne's alleged misappropriation of CollegeSource's intellectual property "was not a 'continuous and systematic' forum activity, but rather, a few discrete acts over a relatively short period of time". Lastly, the court reasoned that AcademyOne's relationships with three hundred California registered users, from which the company allegedly makes no profit; AcademyOne's single business trip to a trade show in San Diego; and AcademyOne's interconnectivity of its website fell below the threshold required to establish general personal jurisdiction.

=== Specific jurisdiction ===
The court held that AcademyOne was subject to specific personal jurisdiction in California. Accordingly, the court reasoned that AcademyOne (1) directed its activities to California, (2) the claim of misappropriation to the related activities, and (3) AcademyOne did not prove that exercise of jurisdiction would not comport with fair play and substantial justice.

First, the Court reasoned that since CollegeSource claims alleged misappropriation, it would be fitting to use the purposeful direction analysis. Using this analysis - the Court found that AcademyOne intentionally downloading the CollegeSource's catalogues and placing CollegeSource's catalogue and course descriptions on its website; reasonably knowing that CollegeSource was a direct competitor regardless of hiring contractors; and allegedly causing CollegeSource to suffer economic loss - satisfied the purposeful direction analysis.

Second, the court found that AcademyOne downloading and republishing CollegeSource's catalogues satisfied a claim arising out of or related to forum activities. The facts that AcademyOne may not have known the state in which CollegeSource was registered and the AcademyOne may have not have known that it was downloading CollegeSource's material were not material.

Last, the court found that AcademyOne's reasons such as being a small company with little means and that CollegeSource could easily litigate in Pennsylvania were unpersuasive. Therefore, the court reasoned that the exercise of jurisdiction comported with fair play and substantial justice.

== Conclusion ==
The Court ruled that AcademyOne was subject to specific personal jurisdiction in California with respect to CollegeSource's misappropriation claims, but not subject to general personal jurisdiction. With respect to CollegeSource's other claims, the court ruled that AcademyOne would be subject to personal jurisdiction under the doctrine of pendant personal jurisdiction (or supplemental jurisdiction). Eventually, after delays waiting on the related case in the third circuit, this case was dismissed in September 2015 by Judge Curiel.

== See also ==
- Personal jurisdiction
- Burger King Corp. v. Rudzewicz
- J. McIntyre Machinery, Ltd. v. Nicastro
