= Burger Baron =

Canadian fast-food restaurant name

- Type: Independent
- Industry: Restaurants
- Founded: Calgary or Lethbridge, Alberta, 1957; 69 years ago
- Products: Fast food (hamburgers, donairs, pizza)

The Burger Baron name is used by several fast-food restaurants in western Canada.

== History ==
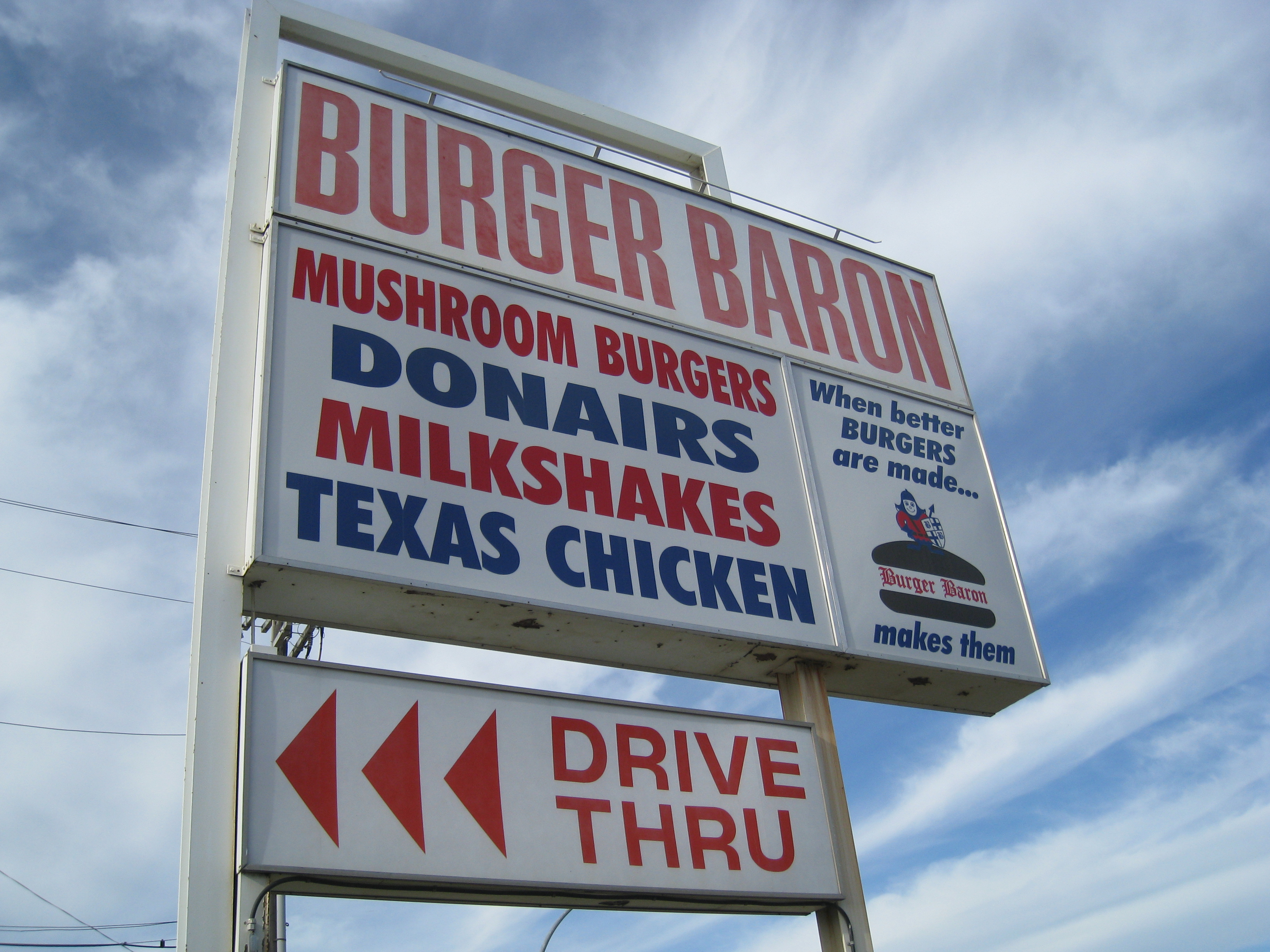
Burger Baron sign

Burger Baron was founded in 1957 by Jack McDonnell. It was founded in either Calgary or Lethbridge, Alberta (the location and ownership of the first site is disputed), Burger Baron was the first drive-in chain in Western Canada. The company expanded quickly throughout the region, but suffered when the big American chains began to move into the area. The original franchise operation collapsed into bankruptcy, and current restaurants are independently operated, with different menus, recipes, signage and advertising. Today, there are still dozens of Burger Baron restaurants operating throughout Western Canada, but they are mostly concentrated around Edmonton, and in small towns in Alberta. There is one lone exception to this rule, however: as of April 2026, there is still a Burger Baron location that is operating in Kelowna, British Columbia, located at 140 Rutland Rd N. It is the only Burger Baron that is not located in Alberta.

Today, the oldest Burger Baron location that is still in operation is located at 5020 50th Ave in the City of Leduc, Alberta; having first opened its doors in 1971. It is owned and operated by Rudy's son, Jamal Kemaldean.

Many of the owners are Lebanese Canadians, connected to Riad "Rudy" Kemaldean of Edmonton, who bought the first of his seven restaurants in 1965, hired family and friends, and encouraged them to open their own operations under the Burger Baron name.

Among other things, Burger Baron is famous for being endorsed by former Edmonton Oilers hockey coach Glen Sather and other former members of the Edmonton Oilers.

Several Burger Baron buildings formerly belonged to other chains. Five of them were part of the local Burger King chain, once Burger Baron's main rival, which became defunct when the worldwide Burger King company acquired the rights to the name for northern Alberta in 1995. The local Burger King chain had previously held franchising rights to Kentucky Fried Chicken, and had buildings in the then-standard KFC design. The Burger Baron on 111 Avenue 95 Street which used to be owned by Wes Kemaldean, formerly housed the Burger King headquarters; along with a Burger King/Kentucky Fried Chicken outlet.

An attempt in the 1980s to return to a franchise system ended when independent owners were unable to reach an agreement. A legal dispute over the trademark between family members of early owners was settled in the 1990s.

== Products ==
Burger Barons typically provide multiple variations of burgers, such as a "Salisbury Burger", and the "Pizza Burger". The mushroom burger is Burger Baron's most popular. In recent years, one of the chain's main features has been Halifax-style donairs, available only in certain locations. Many locations also serve pizza, fried chicken, and fish & chips.

== See also ==
- List of hamburger restaurants
- Burger King (Alberta)
- Burger King
