= Krispy Kream Drive-In =

Restaurant in Belsano, Pennsylvania

- Interactive map of Krispy Kream Drive-In

Restaurant information
- Established: 1968
- Location: Belsano, Cambria County, Pennsylvania, United States
- Coordinates: 40.5178°N 78.8653°W

Krispy Kream Drive-In is a drive-in restaurant and ice cream parlor located in Belsano, Pennsylvania, United States. From 2004 to 2009, the establishment's owners were involved in litigation with doughnut chain restaurant Krispy Kreme over the use of a similar name. The case was settled in 2009 on the condition that Krispy Kream would not sell doughnuts and that they would keep "Drive-In" in their name.

== Restaurant ==
Krispy Kream Drive-In is located in Belsano, Pennsylvania, United States, off of Route 422. It serves ice cream and soft serve alongside hot dogs, hamburgers, french fries and other basic American-style fare. The restaurant serves eight rotating varieties of hard ice cream and thirty varieties of soft serve. It has a carport to protect customers from precipitation. Customers park, and then place their order at one of three walk-up ordering windows. WTAJ-TV noted they have one of the highest Yelp scores of ice cream stores in Cambria County.

== History ==
The restaurant first opened in 1968. Jack Hoover, originally a milkman who serviced the shop, bought the shop in 1983 alongside his wife Chrissy.

=== Lawsuit with Krispy Kreme ===
The name of the restaurant bears a strong resemblance to doughnut chain Krispy Kreme. Though the founding of Krispy Kreme Doughnuts predates the Krispy Kream Drive-In, the doughnut chain did not expand into Western Pennsylvania, where the Drive-In is located, until 2001. In 2004, a Krispy Kreme Doughnuts employee visiting the chain's locations in Western Pennsylvania spotted the restaurant as he drove along Route 422. In September 2004, the drive-in received a letter from the doughnut chain asking them to cease using the name. The owners had been aware of the possibility that Krispy Kreme Doughnuts could object to their name; when Crissy Hoover read the letter, her reaction was, "Oh, boy, Krispy Kreme found us."

Krispy Kream Drive-In offered to place a sign on their property to clarify that they were not affiliated with the larger chain, but said that changing their name would cost them the branding and reputation they had built up in their community. In 2005, Krispy Kreme Doughnuts offered an agreement in which the drive-in would continue to use the name for five years in a limited capacity, after which they would change their name. John Metz, a local owner of Krispy Kreme Doughnuts franchises, objected to the legal threats, saying, "This is ridiculous. How much could they [Krispy Kream Drive-In] hurt us?" Krispy Kream Drive-In declined to change their name and retained an attorney, who quipped that, "If I have to work for ice cream, that's how it's going to be." In 2009, Krispy Kreme Doughnuts ended the lawsuit, allowing Krispy Kream Drive-In to continue using the name as long as they do not sell doughnuts and continued to use "Drive-In" as part of their name.

== See also ==
- Burger King, a restaurant in Mattoon, Illinois, unaffiliated with the Burger King chain
