= Burger King Corporation v Hungry Jack's Pty Ltd =

Australian court case between Burger King and Hungry Jack's

Burger King Corporation v Hungry Jack's
- Court: New South Wales Court of Appeal
- Full case name: Burger King Corporation v Hungry Jack's Pty Ltd
- Decided: 21 June 2001
- Citations: [2001] NSWCA 187, (2001) 69 NSWLR 558

Case history
- Subsequent actions: Application for special leave to appeal to the High Court: [2002] HCATrans 180; appeal dismissed by consent: [2002] HCATrans 578

Court membership
- Judges sitting: Sheller, Beazley & Stein JJA

Case opinions
- Hungry Jack's breach of clause 2.1 did not give Burger King a right to terminate the contract, because clause 2.1 was not an essential term (per curiam); clause 15.1 did not give Burger King a right to terminate the contract (per curiam); Burger King was in breach of an implied term of good faith (per curiam)

Burger King Corporation v Hungry Jack's (2001) 69 NSWLR 558 was an Australian court case decided in the New South Wales Court of Appeal on 21 June 2001, concerning a dispute between United States–based fast food chain Burger King, and its Australian franchisee Hungry Jack's. It related to the breach of a business development agreement between the two companies, and the resulting attempts of Burger King to terminate the contract. The Court of Appeal decided that Burger King could not terminate the contract, for several reasons, one of which was that it was in breach of an implied term of good faith, having taken steps to engineer the breach of the contract.

The case is significant in Australian contract law as one of the most expansive characterisations yet of an implied term of good faith, particularly as it operates to limit parties exercising their contractual rights.

== Background to the case ==
Hungry Jack's became the Australian franchisee of Burger King in 1971, and by 1996 it was the largest franchisee outside the United States, operating 150 restaurants directly and a further 18 through third-party franchisees. From the 1980s onwards, Burger King had increased its interest in the operations of Hungry Jack's, leading to a number of disputes which prompted alterations to the franchise agreements in 1986, 1989, and again late in 1990 with the completion of four new agreements relating to different aspects of Hungry Jack's activities.

One of these four agreements was the Development Agreement, clause 2.1 of which required Hungry Jack's to open four new stores each year in Western Australia, South Australia and Queensland either directly or through third-party franchisees. Additionally, clause 4.1 made the opening of any new restaurants subject to Burger King's operational and financial approval.

Several more disputes arose between the parties in the early 1990s, revolving around Burger King's desire to enter the Australian market directly. In 1992, Burger King considered buying out Hungry Jack's and its stores, either itself, through a third party or through a joint venture, but Hungry Jack's rejected these proposals. In 1993, Burger King commenced negotiations with Shell to open Burger King outlets in some of Shell's service stations—initially including but later excluding Hungry Jack's from the discussions—which culminated in the opening of seven outlets from 1995. During this time a senior Hungry Jack's executive was leaking secret information to Burger King about Hungry Jack's internal operations, and advising Burger King of methods it might employ to force Hungry Jack's to sell out its business to Burger King.

The disputes came to a head in 1995, when Burger King withdrew all approval for third-party franchisees, and stopped granting financial or operating approval to proposed new stores, which meant that Hungry Jack's was unable to open four restaurants per year, as required by clause 2.1 of the Development Agreement. Furthermore, in 1996, a number of stores' franchise agreements expired, and while Burger King renegotiated the agreements, the new agreements made future renewals subject to Burger King's approval, rather than providing for a right to renew; following this, Burger King announced that it would not renew any of these store franchises once they expired.

In November 1996, Burger King purported to terminate the agreement between itself and Hungry Jack's, on the basis that Hungry Jack's had not opened the required number of stores. Hungry Jack's then sued Burger King, alleging that Burger King had no right to terminate the agreement, and also challenging the validity of the new extension agreements. Hungry Jack's was successful at trial, the trial judge finding that there had been breaches of contract and breaches of fiduciary duty on Burger King's part, and awarding Hungry Jack's nearly A$71 million in damages. Burger King appealed against the decision.

== Arguments ==
=== Clause 2.1 ===
Hungry Jack's argued that its failure to comply with clause 2.1 did not give Burger King a right to terminate the agreement. Clause 8.1 of the agreement provided that the franchise fees normally payable by Hungry Jack's would be waived if the development schedule were complied with (that is, if Hungry Jack's opened the required number of stores), and further provided that, even if Hungry Jack's failed to comply, it would have a 12-month grace period to remedy the failure and still avoid the franchise fees. Hungry Jack's argued that this meant Burger King would not have a right to terminate until the grace period expired, or else it would lose its opportunity to remedy the failure to comply. Burger King argued that clause 15.1(d) — which allowed it to terminate the agreement if any of the conditions were breached — was worded broadly enough that any breach would activate it, and that clause 8.1 only operated if it chose not to terminate the agreement.

Burger King alternatively argued that even if it had no right to terminate under clause 15.1(d), it had a right to terminate for a breach of clause 2.1 on ordinary principles of contract law, because clause 2.1 was an essential term of the contract. It argued that terms in commercial contracts setting out the time for performance are usually considered essential terms.

=== Good faith ===
Hungry Jack's also argued that the Development Agreement included an implied term of good faith (that is, that the parties must act in good faith when exercising their rights under the contract), and that Burger King had breached this term by denying the financial and operating approval to new restaurants, leading to Hungry Jack's failing to meet the minimum stores requirement. As a result of this breach of good faith, it argued, Burger King could not successfully terminate the contract.

== Judgment ==
The Court of Appeal delivered a unanimous judgment, dismissing the appeal. They found that Burger King had no right to terminate the contract, whether under clause 15.1(d) of the agreement, or under general principles of contract law, and further found that Burger King had breached an implied term of good faith.

=== Clause 2.1 ===
The court first considered clause 2.1 in the Development Agreement. They noted that, while on its face it seemed to create in Burger King a right to terminate in the event of non-compliance by Hungry Jack's, it was actually subject to a number of qualifications, and that there were other procedures within the agreement for dealing with situations of non-compliance. The court disagreed with Burger King's broad reading of the consequences of a breach of clause 2.1, concluding that such an interpretation would mean that Hungry Jack's could not take advantage of the grace period, and that a narrower view should be preferred. Accordingly, they found that since Burger King had not allowed the 12-month grace period to expire, its termination was not effective.

The court then considered whether clause 2.1 was an essential term, breach of which would allow Burger King to terminate the contract on the basis of ordinary principles of contract law. It considered a number of other clauses which provided for various procedures if clause 2.1 were not complied with (including the grace period in clause 8.1), and held that clause 2.1 could not be considered an essential term, as it could not be said that Burger King would not have entered the contract without being assured of strict compliance with it.

The court thus found that Burger King had no right to terminate the contract for Hungry Jack's breach of 2.1, either under the contract or under the common law.

=== Good faith ===
In considering whether an implied term of good faith (along with an implied term of reasonableness) was included in the contract, the court first discussed past New South Wales cases on the point, in which terms of good faith had been implied into the relevant contracts, particularly Renard Constructions v Minister for Public Works. In that case, Priestley JA had considered the status of implied terms of good faith in United States contract law—particularly via an examination of the Second Restatement of Contracts—where requirements of good faith are not only well-entrenched but often incorporated into contracts by way of legislation. The court also examined the recognition of good faith in other Australian jurisdictions.

The court found that a requirement of good faith may well be implied in all commercial contracts, particularly in standard form contracts. However, it also considered that the contract in this case did not fall into any of the traditional categories of contracts where such terms are often implied. The court held that in these circumstances, it is necessary to consider whether the requirement of good faith is both reasonable and necessary in determining whether it should be implied into the contract. In this case, the court said that the term was reasonable and necessary, since otherwise Burger King would be able to deny approval for new stores "capriciously, or with the sole intent of engineering a default of the Development Agreement".

In terms of the meaning of good faith, the court considered that there was no "distinction of substance" between an obligation to act in good faith and an obligation to act reasonably. It further said that, while parties to a contract are allowed to pursue their own legitimate commercial interests within the framework of a contract, to do so for a purpose extraneous to the contract would be a breach of good faith.

The court held that Burger King's actions in denying financial and operating approval for new restaurants were not the legitimate pursuit of interests under the Development Agreement, but were rather efforts to harm or hinder Hungry Jack's.

== Consequences ==
Burger King subsequently sought special leave to appeal to the High Court of Australia, which was granted. However, the appeal was subsequently dismissed by agreement between the parties.

The case has been recognised as one among several cases indicating that "[a] duty of good faith in the performance of contracts is on the agenda of Australian contract law". Horrigan identified the case as one of a number of cases in which New South Wales courts were leading the way in terms of good faith in Australian contract law, while noting that the idea has yet to catch on extensively in other jurisdictions, identifying good faith as one of the important unresolved areas of "fairness-based business regulation".

To the extent that the decision represents a trend towards treating good faith as an implied term in many contracts, or possibly even a universal term, it has been criticised in a number of ways.

Adrian Baron has argued that the implication of a term of good faith runs contrary to basic principles of contract law, because it tends to disregard the reality that (at least in commercial contexts) parties to a contract "pursue their own commercial interests, and enter into terms that reflect the risks and benefits that each party is prepared to bear". Baron argued that in 1990, when the parties entered the Development Agreement, "it would have been plain to Hungry Jack's that if certain events occurred, Burger King could, at its option, terminate the agreement", and that the contract sufficiently identified the circumstances warranting termination of the contract, with the result that "[t]he appendage of a requirement of reasonableness and good faith by the court to the agreement was inconsistent with the bargain freely entered into by the parties."

Carter and Peden have argued that the case, along with Renard Constructions, introduced a number of "unexplained anomalies in the law of termination clauses", including creating inconsistencies with other precedents relating to powers of sale and equitable limitations on challenging the termination of sale of land contracts. Carter and Peden further argued that an implied good faith term is unnecessary, because basic contract principles already account for it, and it can only serve to introduce inconsistencies, stating that "[i]t seems clear that there are some who see Australian contract law as the 'poor relation' in comparison with other jurisdictions when it comes to good faith" and that "[a] term of good faith is then implied almost by way of apology to the parties."

This case was one of a number of cases relied on in argument before the High Court of Australia in the case of Royal Botanic Gardens and Domain Trust v South Sydney City Council; however, the court dealt with the dispute without needing to consider the issue, "technically reserv[ing] for another day [their] conclusive response" to the question of implied terms of good faith. As of June 2017, the case has yet to be considered in any other High Court cases.

== See also ==
- Burger King Corp. v. Rudzewicz
- Burger King legal issues
