= Burger King (Alberta) =

Former Canadian restaurant chain

- Trade name: Burger King Drive Inn
- Formerly: Burger King/Kentucky Fried Chicken
- Industry: Restaurants
- Founded: 1956; 70 years ago in Edmonton, Alberta, Canada
- Founder: William R. Jarvis, James Duncan Rae
- Defunct: 1995; 31 years ago
- Fate: Defunct
- Successor: Burger Baron; KFC
- Number of locations: 12 (1975)
- Products: Fast food (hamburgers, chicken)

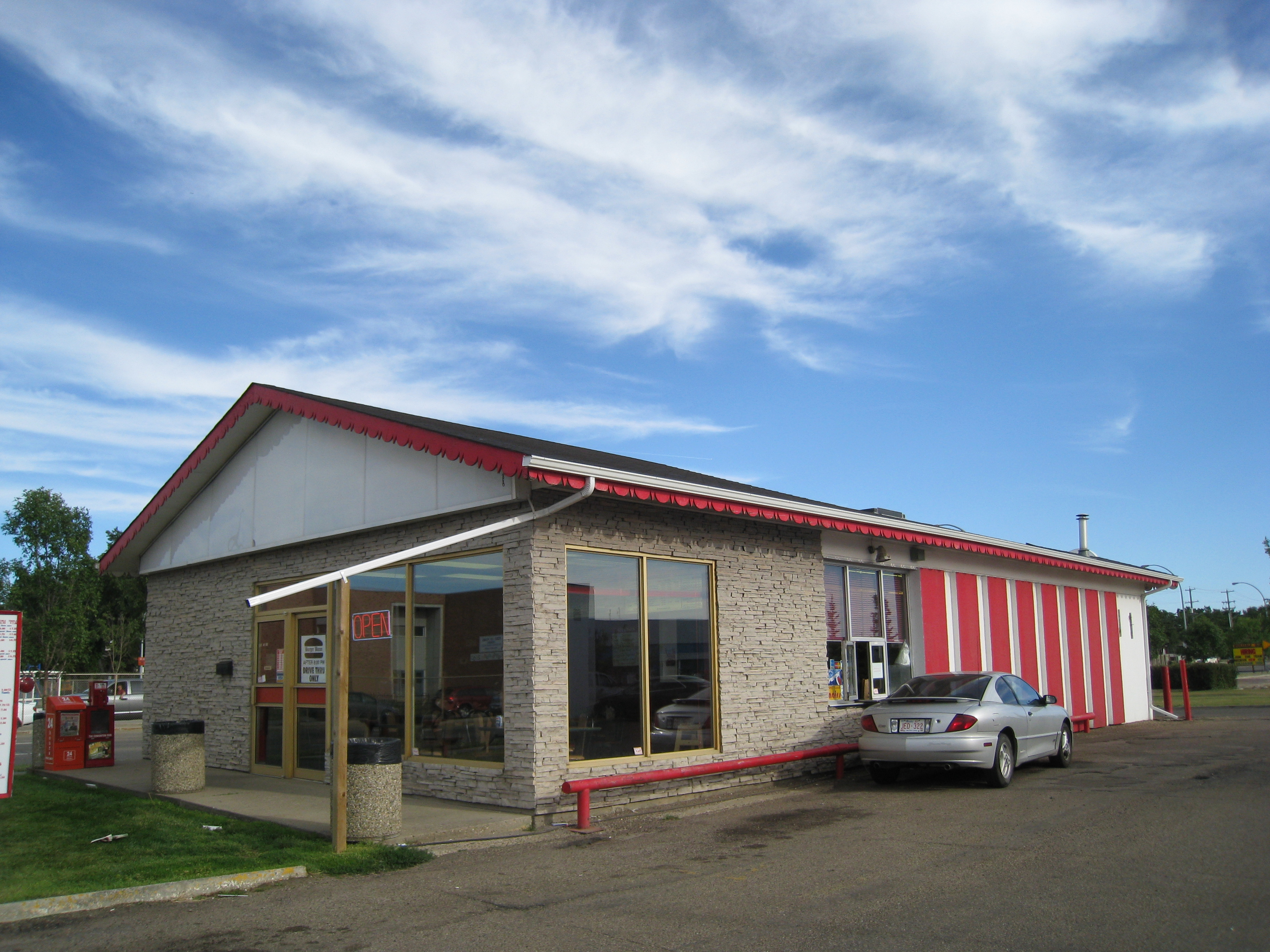
The former Burger King/Kentucky Fried Chicken No. 5 on 70 Avenue is now a Burger Baron

Burger King was a fast food restaurant chain in Edmonton, Alberta, Canada. Also known as Burger King Drive-Inn, it was founded by former Imperial Oil executives William R. Jarvis (1926-21 July 2014) and James Duncan Rae (3 September 1923 - 17 December 2014) in 1956. Among the first American-style fast food restaurants in Edmonton, it was not related to the worldwide Burger King chain. Company headquarters were in offices above one of the restaurants, at 9501 111 Avenue. Its signature items included a mushroom burger and a "Canadian Burger".

The restaurant was inspired by a visit Jarvis paid to Great Falls, Montana in 1953, when he stayed next to a Dairy Queen drive-in. After the chain turned down his request for a franchise, he and Rae formed their own Dairy Drive-In at 8705 118 Avenue. Two years later, when their lease expired, they hauled the building to a site at 112 Avenue, where it would become the first Burger King. It opened one year before the first outlet of what would become its main rival, A&W.

Jarvis and Rae acquired the rights to sell the then little-known Kentucky Fried Chicken in 1959. Many of their Burger King restaurants were dual-branded as "Burger King/Kentucky Fried Chicken". Chicken sales were slow at first, but by the mid-1960s, Edmonton had KFC's highest per capita sales in Canada.

In the mid-1960s, the US Burger King chain planned to expand to Canada, where Jarvis and Rae had trademarked the name. In 1965-66, they reached an agreement that granted their rival the rights to the "Burger King" name for all of Canada except Alberta north of the 52nd parallel, passing through Innisfail, which was reserved in perpetuity for the local chain. The US chain entered the Canadian market in 1969 with a store in Windsor, Ontario.

By 1975, when McDonald's opened its first Edmonton restaurant near Capilano Mall, Burger King had 12 outlets. As the market became more competitive, the relationship between Burger King and Kentucky Fried Chicken deteriorated, with KFC attempting legal action to end the partnership. The matter was ultimately resolved in 1990, when KFC, by then under the ownership of PepsiCo, refused to extend the franchise, and Jarvis and Rae instead sold their remaining dual-branded restaurants to them.

In August 1995, when two non-KFC Burger King restaurants were still in operation, they sold the naming rights for northern Alberta for $1 million to the US company. It immediately announced its intention to enter the market, the last region of North America where it had been unable to operate, other than Mattoon, Illinois, where another restaurant uses the name.

Several Burger King restaurants became Burger Barons.

== See also ==
- Burger King legal issues
- List of hamburger restaurants
