= Scheck v. Burger King Corp. =

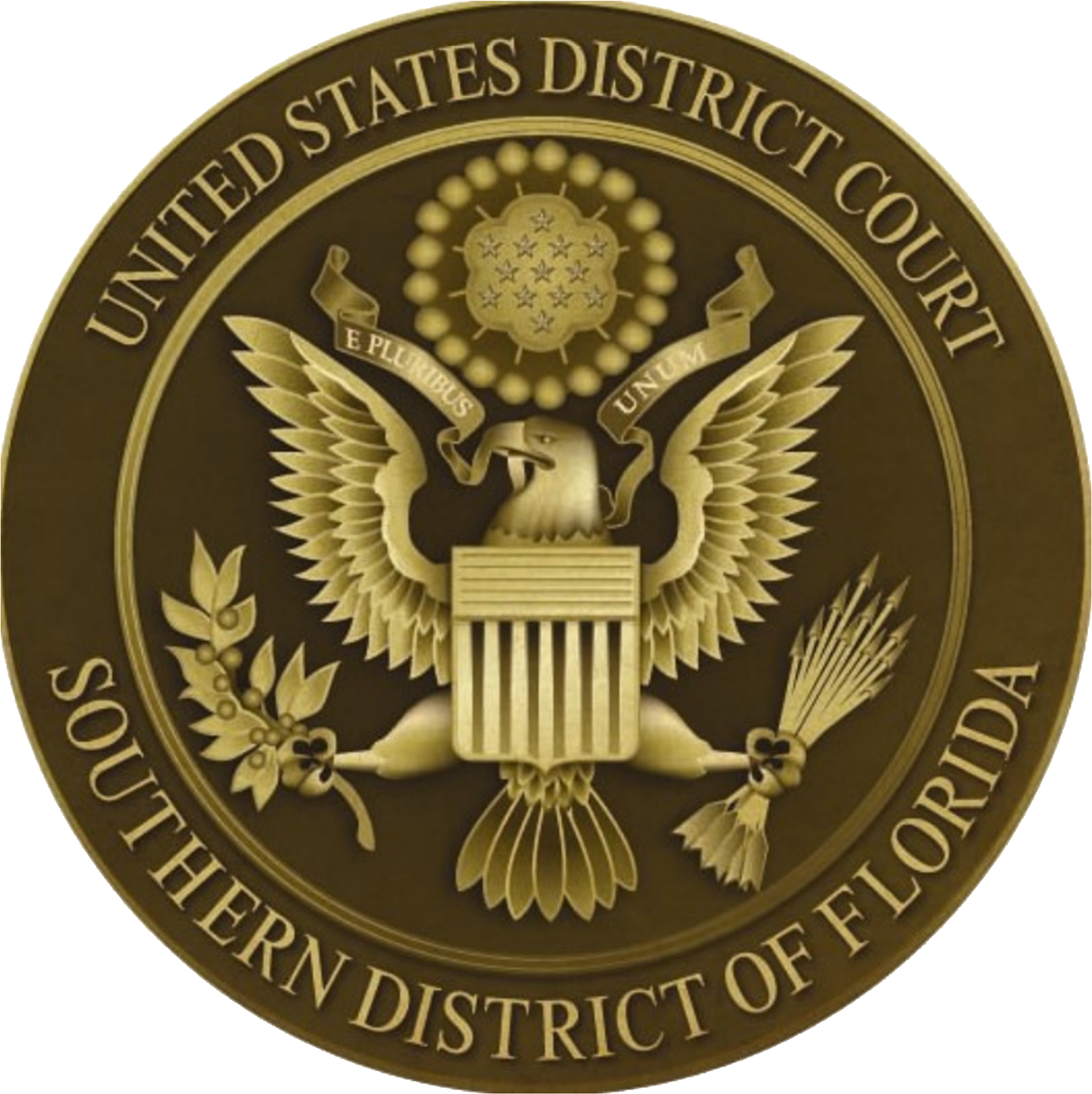
- Court: United States District Court for the Southern District of Florida
- Full case name: Steven A. SCHECK, Plaintiff, v. BURGER KING CORPORATION, Defendant.
- Decided: January 15, 1991
- Citation: 756 F. Supp. 543 (S.D. Fla. 1991)
- Transcript: Justia

Court membership
- Judge sitting: Hoeveler

Case opinions
- (1) Florida Law governs this case; (2) Defendant's Affirmative Defenses of Release and Statute of Frauds are denied and dismissed; (3) Defendant's motion for summary judgement as to the claim in count 1 of an implied non-competition agreement is granted and count 1 is dismissed; (4) Defendant's motion for summary judgement as to the claim in count 2 of an implied covenant of good faith and fair dealing is denied; (5) Defendant's motion for summary judgement as to the claim in count 3 of an implied contract and assertion of promissory estoppel is granted and count 3 is dismissed; (6) Defendant's motion for summary judgement as to the claim in count 4 of violations of the Massachusetts Consumer Protection Act is granted and count 4 is dismissed.
- Decision by: William Hoeveler

Scheck v. Burger King Corp. (756 F. Supp. 543 (S.D. Fla. 1991) was a case of the United States District Court for the Southern District of Florida in which it considered motions for summary judgement brought by defendant Burger King Corporation concerning four counts raised by Plaintiff Scheck who alleged that defendant "breached an implied non-competition agreement (Count I), an implied covenant of good faith and fair dealing (Count II) an implied contract created by promissory estoppel (Count III) and the Massachusetts Consumer Protection Act" which plaintiff alleged incorporates the proceeding three claims. Burger King moved for summary judgement on the basis that Scheck's claims were insufficient "as a matter of law", were barred by the Massachusetts Statute of Frauds, or were released by the plaintiff as a direct result of two releases executed by Scheck in 1985 and 1986, respectively. The case invoked legal questions concerning the covenant of good faith and fair dealing related to legal protection of the territory rights of franchisees.

== Background and procedural history ==
On February 6, 1989, Steven Scheck, the owner of a Burger King franchise restaurant located in Lee, Massachusetts, filed a complaint in four counts against Burger King in the United States District Court for the District of Massachusetts. Prior to the Scheck's complaint, a nearby Howard Johnson restaurant, located two miles away from Scheck's franchise, was converted into a new Burger King restaurant by Marriott Corporation. This conversion was supported by Burger King holdings, and effectively allowed for the creation of a corporately owned but competing franchise location.

Scheck alleged that he was entitled to compensable damages due to Burger King's sanctioning of the conversion. Burger King's initial response was composed of a motion to dismiss and/or transfer the case pursuant to 28 U.S.C. §1404 , (Note: Most relevant here is §(a), which allows a district court to transfer any civil action to any other district or division to which all parties have consented. Burger King alleged that this consent was expressed as part of the Franchisee 'Assignment Agreement') claiming that the forum selection provision of the Assignment Agreement requires that the suit be litigated in the U.S. District Court for the Southern District of Florida.

In an order dated June 15, 1989, Chief U.S. District Judge for the District of Massachusetts Judge Frank H. Freedman denied the motion to dismiss, but ordered that in the interest of justice, the case be transferred to the District Court for the Southern District of Florida pursuant to the previously mentioned change of venue provision of the United States code. The matters of jurisdiction and venue were decided under the provisions of 28 U.S.C. §1332 and 28 U.S. Code § 1391(a), respectively, with the court finding complete diversity between the parties and an amount in controversy in excess of $50,000 with regard to the former issue, and interpreting §1391(a) as allowing jurisdiction regardless of whether the action itself was local or transitory.

=== On choice of law ===
The district court relied on the parties' original franchise agreement in determining that Florida law would govern all suits related to protecting or securing rights as they arose under the conditions of the agreement. Scheck argued that the dispute should be governed by Massachusetts law, as "most of the transactions between Scheck and Burger King [had] taken place in Massachusetts." Scheck also alleged that the issues raised in his original complaint did not invoke rights under the specific provisions of the franchise agreement, and are thus not subject to that agreement's choice of law provision. He argued that his complaint did not seek to "protect or secure:" rights as they arose under the franchise agreement, but rather sought to enforce rights that were created independently of the agreement.

In transferring the original action to the current court, Massachusetts District Court Judge Freedman ruled that, regardless of how the plaintiff sought to characterize his claims against Burger King, were not for the franchise agreement, Plaintiff would have no rights upon which to state a claim. The Florida court agreed with Freedman's ruling, and accepted the franchise agreement as the origin and merit for the plaintiff's claims.

The court next considered the proper conflict of laws rule and legitimacy of the choice of law clause as provided in the franchise agreement. On this issue, the court turned to the precedent set by the U.S. Supreme Court in Klaxon Co. v. Stentor Elec. Mfg. Co., Inc., 313 U.S. 487 (1941), which held, "In diversity of citizenship cases, the federal courts when deciding questions of conflict of laws must follow the rules prevailing in the States in which they sit." The court thus applied its own conflict of laws rule with respect to the franchise agreement's initial determination of the law to be applied to the suit. The court did allow that the original forum state of the suit is that where the action was originally filed , (Note: quoting Van Dusen v. Barrack 376 U.S. 612.) but noted that under Massachusetts law, choice of law and forum selection clauses, such as those found in the original franchise agreement, are valid without rebuttal, and must be upheld unless a party can present "evidence of fraud, undue influence, [or] overweening bargaining power. . (Note: Fireman's Fund Amer. Ins. Cos. v. Puerto Rican Forwarding Co., Inc 492 F.2d 1294, 1297 (1st Cir. 1974)) Upholding the validity of the original franchise agreement and the absence of fraud or unequal bargaining power, the court held that both parties originally intended to be governed by the rules of Florida (Note: The original Franchise Agreement provided in §18(C) concerning governing law, that "This Agreement shall become valid when executed and accepted by [Burger King] at Miami, Florida; it shall be deemed made and entered into in the State of Florida and shall be governed and construed under and in accordance with the laws of the State of Florida (emphasis added)) rendering the original transfer of the case valid and standing.

=== Motions for summary judgement ===
==== Nullification of claims under lease termination and general release ====
Burger King raised a motion for summary judgment, claiming that the totality of Scheck's claims had been released as a result of a jointly-executed "Agreement of Cancellation and Termination of Lease and General Release" on November 20, 1985. (Note: The document, which was signed during the closing of Scheck's outright purchase from Burger King Corporation of the Lee site, reads in part: "[I]n further consideration of the execution of this Agreement, M&S [Associates], Scheck and [Burger King Corporation] mutually release one another... of and from any and all claims whatsoever in law or in equity, which it may have, now has or may have by reason of any matter, cause or thing whatsoever arising out of or in connection with the Lease, the relationship between [Burger King Corporation] and M&S [Associates] and Scheck as vendor and vendee of goods, or any other cause or circumstance.") Burger King alleged a second release effective May 27, 1986 which concerned Scheck's purchase of his partner Ralph Marvin's interest in the franchise (Note: Paragraph 2 of section "Assignment and Assumption of Interest in Restaurant Franchise Agreement and Lease Agreement and Consent to Assignment", reads in pertinent part: "[BURGER KING CORPORATION], ASSIGNOR and ASSIGNEE hereby mutually release each other...of and from any and all claims whatsoever, in law or in equity, which they have or may have by reason of any matter, cause, or thing whatsoever arising out of or in connection with the Agreements, relationships, or a course of dealings between [BURGER KING] and ASSIGNOR and [BURGER KING] and ASSIGNEE as vendor and vendee of any goods, the operation of the Restaurant, or for any other cause or circumstance with (sic) existed prior to the date of this Agreement.") Burger King alleged that since Scheck was aware of the dispute that arose during the conversion of the Howard Johnson in Massachusetts before the releases were signed, all of his claims against Burger King are nullified by these releases. This contention is supported under Florida case law, which holds that a general release "will ordinarily be regarded as embracing all claims or demands which had matured at the time of its execution." . (Note: quoting Sottile v. Gaines Construction Co., 281 So. 2d 558, 561 (Fla.App. 1973) cert denied, 289 So. 2d 737 (Fla. 1974)) The court held that as a result, a general release cannot be held to bar a claim which did not exist when it was signed (Note: referencing both Sottile and Ciliberti v. Ciliberti, 416 So. 2d 48, 49 (Fla. App. 1982).) Judge Hoeveler held that, though Burger King argued that general releases could serve to bar claims that arose after execution of a release when those claims came about from promises and obligations that existed prior to the release, it offered no grounding in Florida law for this argument. He also found that Burger King's reliance on the precedent of Coral Gables Imported Motorcars, Inc. v. Flat Motors of North America, Inc. 673 F.2d 1234 (11th Cir. 1982) was misplaced, writing that there the appellate court found that Coral Cables Motorcars claims of fraud under the terms of an initial franchise agreement had matured and were thus compensable at the time the plaintiff entered into and executed a general release in conjunction with a subsequent franchise agreement.

The court found that, when Scheck's releases from Burger King were executed, he had no grounding for an encroachment claim against Burger King. It was also found that, while Scheck may have been aware of the possible conversion of the Howard Johnson's as early as late 1985, a claims could not arise until Burger King Corporation actually allowed the Marriott Corporation to open the new franchise itself, or at least until an agreement was entered by both Burger King and Marriott that indicated both had intention to open the new franchise at the contentious location. As the site selection for the new franchise was in question as late as February 1987, and a franchise agreement between Burger King Corporation and Marriott was not entered until June 30, 1987, any attempt by Scheck even to enjoin Burger King before May 1986 would have been dismissed as not yet ripe . (Note: see id. at Sottile v. Gaines Construction Co..) Judge Hoeveler thus denied Burger King's motion for summary judgement under the release by prior agreement theory.

==== Summary judgement through statute of frauds defense ====
Burger King also raised the statute of frauds as defense and motion for summary judgement with respect to all of Scheck's claims, arguing that the claims are contingent on an exclusive territory agreement, which was found by the court to not meet statutory requirements, as it was unwritten and not susceptible of performance, nor intended to be performed, in less than one year (Note: Florida's Statute of Frauds requires performance within not more than one year with respect to any agreement, unless the agreement is in writing and signed by the party executing the performance, or their designee.) The Court found that Scheck did not assert breach of an oral exclusive territory agreement, nor entitlement to an exclusive territory. Rather, as was previously settled, Scheck claimed a breach of duties that were implied in the Franchise Agreement. Thus, the court did not acknowledge the finding of an "independent contract" which would have governed territorial exclusivity, and denied summary judgment pertaining to a statute of frauds defense.

== Discussion ==
=== Respecting count I: Implied non-competition agreement ===
Scheck alleged that when his original Lee site was purchased from Burger King it came with an implied promise of general non-competition, and a specific promise not to establish a franchise at the Howard Johnson location. Florida law prohibits express or implied contracts that restrain trade, but allows an exception where the good will of a business the value of the business's reputation in the community is part of a sale. Burger King argued that summary judgment must be entered in its favor respecting Count I as there was no sale of a business or good will. Rather, the statute would only extend to the sale of the Lee real estate proper, "from which one may nt imply a covenant of non-competition".

The court acknowledged the good faith of Burger King's argument, and found that the document from which Scheck's contention that he obtained some portion of good will arose was aptly titled "Contract for Sale of Real Estate", and only stated that Scheck "[agreed] to buy that certain piece of real property together with the building and improvements located thereon..." The court also conceded that, if Burger King owned any portion of the franchise's good will as defined by Florida statute, it must have arisen by virtue of the Franchise Agreement's license of the Burger King trademark to Scheck, and was thus not contingent strictly on owning the land and buildings on which the franchise sat. The Court thus found that Burger King's combined interests in the franchise, composed of its monthly royalties and fees, reversionary interest, and expectation that the franchisee not act to sully or dilute the Burger King trademark, were related strictly to Burger King's interest in their trademark(s) alone, and not affected in any way by the sale and transfer of the underlying property. Scheck, however, claimed that the selling price for the real estate, valued at $691,000, reflected the value of the premises as a Burger King franchise, and not simply as a piece of commercial real estate. Judge Hoeveler wrote that, "even if Scheck could show the Lee property cost more than comparable surrounding commercial real estate, that alone would not suffice to avoid summary judgement." The court held that even if Scheck could prove that the Lee property cost more than comparable surrounding commercial properties, that alone would not negate grounds for summary judgment, as the site itself would likely be more valuable to Scheck alone as compared to a non-Burger King franchisee, as the sale would come complete with a functioning Burger King restaurant. The court did allow, however, that the simple notion that a building is valuable or desirable does not constitute good will as defined by Florida statute.

Scheck's argument with respect to Count I would require him to establish evidence of an implied non-competition agreement. As noted by the U.S. Supreme Court, summary judgement is mandated when, after sufficient time is allowed for discovery, there is a lack of evidence to support a non-moving party's case on issues for which that party bears the burden of proof. It is also the burden of the non-moving party to rebut any facts presented affidavit or other evidence that would indicate the presence of a genuine and material issue of fact for trial, rather than to simply allege the existence of a broad factual dispute. For these reasons, the count did grant Burger King's motion for summary judgement with respect to Count I.

=== Respecting count II: Implied covenant of good faith and fair dealing ===
A given contract includes not only what is expressly written in it, but also those matters or terms which, though not expressed, are implied by law, which are held to be as binding as those terms which are either written or oral. The state of Florida also recognizes the implied covenant of good faith and fair dealing, as held in Fernandez v. Vazquez and Johnson v. Davis. Burger King did not explicitly deny the existence of this implied covenant of good faith in its motion for summary judgement, but rather argued that those acts explicitly authorized through the Franchise Agreement cannot constitute prima facie bad faith. This reasoning arose primarily from the defendant's interpretation that the Franchise Agreement declines to "grant or imply" Scheck "any area, market, or territorial rights" . (Note: quoting §1 of the original Franchise Agreement) However, the Court noted here that the explicit denial of territory rights to Scheck does not apply that Burger King itself has the right to open other proximate franchises at its will, regardless of their effect on Scheck's franchise operations. Thus, while Scheck is not entitled by agreement to an exclusive territory per se, he is entitled to expect that Burger King Corporation will not willfully act to destroy the rights of their franchisees to enjoy the natural fruits of the contract. For its part, Burger King had developed explicit policies and procedures specifically to protect against this kind of "cannibalization: and potential ruin of other Burger King franchises (corporate-owned or otherwise), which could result in an overall weakening of the Burger King chain. Scheck's claim here is based on Burger Kings alleged failure to exercise the discretion implied by these policies with good faith and fair dealing, and indeed contravened these policies to protect against the encroachment of other franchises. The court declined to grant summary judgement on this count, citing open issues on whether Burger King actually breached the implied covenant of good faith and fair dealing in its Franchise Agreement.

=== Respecting count III: Implied contract (promissory estoppel) ===
Scheck claimed that an implied oral contract by Burger King not to franchise Marriott's Massachusetts Turnpike site was formed when, at a regional Burger King conference, Region Vice President Charles Olcott stated to Scheck and eight to ten "Burger King VIPs" that "I can't believe that [Burger King President] Jeff Campbell is ever going to allow [the Howard Johnson's conversion]" . (Note: quoting deposition of Plaintiff Scheck, pp. 149-53) Scheck thus claimed compensable damages based on reliance on this statement, and also sought to estop Burger King from denying that it agreed to forgo the planned Turnpike franchise site.

The Court declined to agree that an implied contract was created by Olcott's statement, noting that, while Scheck may have relied on the good faith implications of the statement, he relied on a supposition and not on an actionable promise . (Note: see South Investment Corp. v. Norton, 57 So. 2d 1,(Fla. 1952)) Further, the Court noted that the doctrine of promissory estoppel "require[s] affirmative action indicative of a desire to be contractually bound" . (Note: quoting Prudential Insurance Co. of America v. Clark, 456 F. 2d 932, 936 (5th Cir. 1972).) There was found nothing on record to suggest that Olcott intended either to enter into a contract, nor induce Scheck to do so. Summary judgement on this count was thus granted with the count itself dismissed.

=== Respecting count IV: Massachusetts consumer protection act ===
Scheck also alleged violations of Mass. Gen. Laws c. 93(a), commonly known as the Massachusetts Consumer Protection Act. This count was summarily dismissed as the Court had already settled that Florida law governed this case.

== Holding ==
The court thus held that:

- 1) Florida law governed the case;
- 2) The Defendant's affirmative defenses of Release and Statute of Frauds were denied and dismissed;
- 3) Defendant's motion for summary judgement respecting count I of an implied non-competition agreement was granted and count I dismissed.
- 4) Defendant's motion for summary judgement respecting Count II of an implied covenant of good faith and fair dealing was denied,
- 5) Defendant's motion for summary judgement respecting Count III of an implied contract and resultant assertion of promissory estoppel was granted and count 3 dismissed, and
- 6) Defendant's motion for summary judgement respecting Count IV of violations of the Massachusetts Consumer Protection Act was granted and Count IV summarily dismissed.
