= Westlife Foodworld =

India fast food holding company

Westlife Foodworld Limited
- Type: Public
- Traded as: BSE: 505533; NSE: WESTLIFE
- ISIN: INE274F01020
- Industry: Restaurants
- Founded: 30 October 1982; 44 years ago
- Headquarters: Tower 3, Indiabulls Finance Center, Senapati Bapat Marg, Elphinstone Road, Mumbai, Maharashtra, India
- Number of locations: 305 outlets (October 2021)
- Areas served: Western India; South India
- Key people: Amit Jatia (Chaiperson) Smita Jatia (Vice Chaiperson)
- Brands: McDonald's; McCafé
- Services: Master franchisee for McDonald's in western and southern India
- Revenue: ▲₹2,259 crore (US$240 million) (FY23)
- Net income: ▲₹112 crore (US$12 million) (FY23)
- Owners: Horizon Impex Pvt Ltd (30.4%); Subh Ashish Exim Pvt Ltd (21.37%); Makino Holdings Limited (7.64%)
- Number of employees: 6,905 (FY18)
- Subsidiaries: Hardcastle Restaurants Pvt. Ltd.
- Website: www.westlife.co.in

Westlife Foodworld Limited (formerly Westlife Development Limited) is an Indian fast food restaurant holding company. Its wholly owned subsidiary Hardcastle Restaurants Pvt. Ltd. (HRPL) holds the master franchise for McDonald's in western India and South India.

McDonald's Indian subsidiary, McDonald's India Private Ltd., acquired complete ownership of Connaught Plaza Restaurants Limited, its other Indian master franchisee, on 9 May 2019, ending a partnership established in 1995 and leaving Westlife Development as McDonald's only third-party master franchisee in India.

== History ==
Westlife Development was founded on 30 October 1982. Hardcastle Restaurants was established as a joint venture between Westlife Development and the McDonald's Corporation in 1995. McDonald’s as a fast food joint has been in operation in India Hardcastle opened its first McDonald's restaurant in Bandra, Mumbai in 1996, three days after McDonald's other Indian franchisee have opened the first McDonald's outlet in the country in Basant Lok, Vasant Vihar, Delhi. The joint venture was converted into a master franchisee in 2010. Amit Jatia, the Chairperson of Westlife Foodworld, acquired the McDonald's Corporation's 50% stake in Hardcastle for an undisclosed amount in late 2012. Hardcastle was merged into the listed group company Westlife Development, making the former a wholly owned subsidiary of the latter. Westlife Development was listed on the Bombay Stock Exchange on 27 August 2013.

McDonald's breakfast menu was launched in 2010, and made available all day long at select outlets from 2016. The first McCafe was opened in Mumbai in 2013.

In 2017, Hardcastle initiated a pilot project to use biodiesel made from used cooking oil to power its refrigerated supply delivery trucks some of its restaurants in Mumbai. The program was successfully rolled out to half of the company outlets by July 2018. Hardcastle began rolling out self-ordering kiosks at McDonald's outlets in 2017. The first kiosk was installed at the outlet in CR2 Mall at Nariman Point, Mumbai in March 2017.
