= Burger King Corp. v. Rudzewicz =

Burger King v. Rudzewicz
- Supreme Court of the United States

Argued January 28, 1985 Decided May 20, 1985
- Full case name: Burger King Corporation v. John Rudzewicz
- Citations: 471 U.S. 462 (more) 105 S. Ct. 2174; 85 L. Ed. 2d 528; 53 U.S.L.W. 4541

Case history
- Prior: Judgment for Burger King (S.D. Fla.); rev'd, 724 F.2d 1505 (11th Cir.); rehearing en banc denied, 729 F.2d 1468; consideration of jurisdiction postponed to hearing of merits, 469 U.S. 814 (1984).

Holding
- The District Court's exercise of jurisdiction pursuant to Florida's long-arm statute did not violate the Due Process Clause of the Fourteenth Amendment. Eleventh Circuit reversed and remanded.

Court membership
- Chief Justice Warren E. Burger Associate Justices William J. Brennan Jr. · Byron White; Thurgood Marshall · Harry Blackmun; Lewis F. Powell Jr. · William Rehnquist; John P. Stevens · Sandra Day O'Connor

Case opinions
- Majority: Brennan, joined by Burger, Marshall, Blackmun, Rehnquist, O'Connor
- Dissent: Stevens, joined by White
- Powell took no part in the consideration or decision of the case.

Laws applied
- U.S. Const. amend. XIV

Burger King v. Rudzewicz, 471 U.S. 462 (1985), is a notable case in United States civil procedure that came before the Supreme Court of the United States addressing personal jurisdiction.

== Background ==
John Rudzewicz was a citizen and resident of the state of Michigan and was the senior partner in a Detroit accounting firm. He was approached by Brian MacShara, the son of a business acquaintance, who suggested that they open a Burger King franchise together. The parties eventually reached an agreement whereby Rudzewicz provided the necessary capital and MacShara assumed the responsibility of managing the restaurant. The partners agreed to share profits equally.

Rudzewicz and MacShara applied jointly to Burger King's district office in Birmingham, Michigan in the fall of 1978. The application was forwarded to Burger King's office in Miami, Florida and the parties reached a preliminary agreement to take the franchise for an existing Burger King location in the Drayton Plains area of Waterford Charter Township, Michigan in February 1979. MacShara attended the prescribed management courses at Burger King University in Miami in order to learn to operate a Burger King franchise. The partners purchased $165,000 in restaurant equipment from Davmor Industries, a Burger King corporate division located in Miami.

Under the franchise agreement, Rudzewicz and MacShara were to remit their franchise fees and royalties to Burger King's Florida headquarters. Due to an economic downturn, the defendants were unable to make their monthly payments to Burger King, prompting the Florida-based corporation to file a lawsuit in Florida for breach of contract and infringement of Burger King's trademarks and service marks through the defendants' unauthorized operation as a Burger King restaurant after the defendants received notice to vacate the premises.

=== Burger King's lawsuit ===
Burger King brought a diversity action pursuant to 28 U.S.C. § 1332(a) against the defendants in the United States District Court for the Southern District of Florida in May 1981. Burger King also invoked the Court's original jurisdiction over disputes arising under federal trademark law pursuant to 28 U.S.C. § 1338(a). The District Court held that Florida had jurisdiction because of a statute that allowed the state to extend jurisdiction to anyone breaching a contract within the state. The United States Court of Appeals for the Eleventh Circuit reversed the court's decision, finding that even though the defendants had minimum contacts with Florida, to exercise jurisdiction over the defendants would be fundamentally unfair and thus violate the Due Process Clause of the Fourteenth Amendment. Burger King then appealed to the Supreme Court.

== Opinion of the Court ==
The Supreme Court concluded that the defendants purposefully availed themselves of the protections of the forum state (Florida) and were, therefore, subject to jurisdiction there. The Court reasoned that the defendants had a "substantial and continuing" relationship with Burger King in Florida and that due process would not be violated because the defendants should have reasonably anticipated being summoned into court in Florida for breach of contract.

Justice Brennan's general "Reasonableness" or "Fairness" test was evolved into Justice O'Connor's five-factor test of reasonableness announced two years later in Asahi Metal Industry Co. v. Superior Court, 480 U.S. 102 (1987).

=== Dissent ===
Justice Stevens dissented in an opinion joined by Justice White. Stevens observed that Rudzewicz had never been to Florida and had no business established in Florida. In Stevens' view, Rudzewicz could not have anticipated being summoned into court in Florida, and it violated the due process clause to require a small businessman in Michigan to defend himself against litigation in Florida.

== See also ==
- Burger King Corporation v Hungry Jack's
- List of United States Supreme Court cases, volume 471
