= Burger King (Mattoon, Illinois) =

Independent restaurant

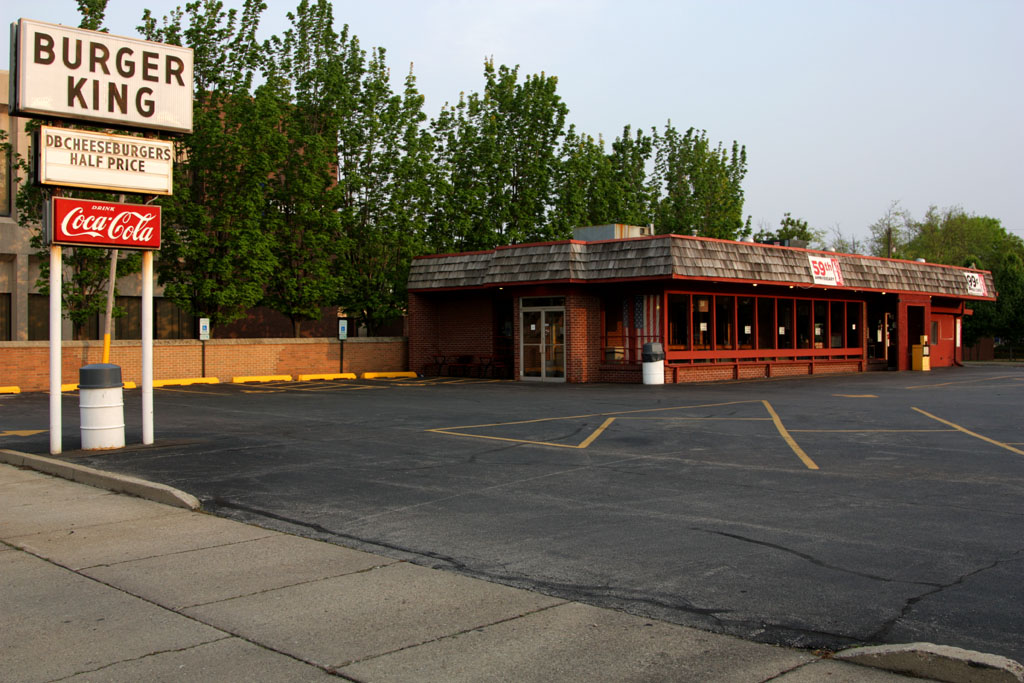
- The Burger King in May 2011
- Interactive map of Burger King

Restaurant information
- Established: 1952
- Owner: Ernie Drummond
- Previous owners: Gene Hoots & Betty Hoots (1952 – 2015); Cory Sanders (2015 – 2017)
- Location: Mattoon, Coles County, Illinois, United States
- Coordinates: 39.4818°N 88.3726°W

Burger King is a restaurant founded by the Hoots family and operated by Burger King LLC of Illinois in Mattoon, Illinois, United States; it is not related to the fast food chain Burger King. The restaurant's founders claim that it is the "original" Burger King and predates the fast food chain. A 1968 court case between this restaurant and the larger Burger King chain is a landmark case in United States trademark law regarding the Lanham Act.

== History ==
Mattoon residents Gene and Betty Hoots bought the successful Frigid Queen ice cream shop from Gene's uncle, Bill Paullin, in 1952. In 1954, Gene expanded the business, adding hamburgers, French fries and other items to the menu. In 1957, they fixed up a two-car parking garage behind the Frigid Queen, adding a grill and a counter for customers. When it came time to give the new business behind the Frigid Queen a name, Gene wanted to go with The Hot Dames; however Betty said that a queen needs a king, and chose the name Burger King instead.

In 1959, after prompting by his uncle, Gene registered the name "Burger King" as a state trademark in Illinois, and the Hootses were official owners and operators of the only "Burger King" restaurant in Illinois at the time.

The Hootses retired in February 2015 and sold the company to a local businessman, Cory Sanders. Sanders announced that he would continue to operate the restaurant but would be making several changes including a planned remodel of the interior, menu expansion and price reductions. Sanders subsequently sold the company in March 2017 to its long-time manager, Ernie Drummond.

== Name dispute ==
The Hoots family learned of the Burger King in Florida and that company's plans for Illinois. The Hootses and their lawyer thought that their state trademark, which was in use before the Florida chain moved into the state, gave them exclusive rights to the "Burger King" name all over the state. However, the Florida chain opened its first Illinois restaurant in Skokie (a Chicago suburb) in 1961; by 1967, the chain had 50 restaurants in Illinois, and the Hootses felt that they needed to take action.

The Hoots filed suit in state court, and the Florida company responded with a federal suit: Burger King of Florida, Inc. v. Hoots (1968). The Hoots had attorney Harlan Heller of Mattoon, whereas the president of the Burger King of Florida appeared with at least six lawyers, according to Betty Hoots. The case went to the federal 7th Circuit Court of Appeals, whose decision still stands as an important interpretation of the Lanham Act.

The court ruled that, because of the federal trademark registration, and because the federal law indicated priority over state law, Florida's Burger King had rights to the name almost everywhere in the United States, including in Illinois, except in the Mattoon area, where the Hoots family had prior actual use. As a result of the case, the Hootses cannot use the name "Burger King" outside of the Mattoon area, and the Florida chain, which operates both nationally in the U.S. and internationally, cannot use the name in the Mattoon area. The district court had previously decided that the Mattoon market area was a circle with a radius of 20 miles (32 km) and centered on the Hootses' restaurant. Thus, the closest Burger King for the Florida chain is located approximately 25 miles (40 km) north of Mattoon in Tuscola, Illinois. As of 2025, the Florida chain has 319 locations in Illinois outside the 20-mile Mattoon area.

Betty Hoots said that Burger King Corp. offered the Hootses $10,000 for the right to operate a Burger King restaurant within the 20-mile Mattoon area, but the Hootses declined.

== See also ==
- Krispy Kream Drive-In
- List of hamburger restaurants
