= Burger King franchises =

Fast food restaurant chain

The majority of the locations of international fast-food restaurant chain Burger King are privately owned franchises. While the majority of franchisees are smaller operations, several have grown into major corporations in their own right. At the end of the company's fiscal year in 2025, Burger King reported it had more than 19,000 outlets in 126 countries and territories. The company locations employ more than 37,000 people who serve approximately 11 million customers daily.

Since its predecessor's inception in 1953, Burger King has used several variations of franchising to expand its operations. In the United States, the company originally relied on a regional franchise model with owners having exclusive expansion rights in a defined geographic territory. This model proved to be problematic as it led to issues of food quality, procedures and image management. A 1970s attempt by one of its largest franchises to take over the chain led to a restructuring of its franchising system, tossing the old method in favor of a restricted, per store licensing model. The 1978 restructuring, led by a new director of operations, firmly placed the mantel of franchise oversight on the shoulders of the company.

While Burger King still utilizes a version of its revamped franchising system in the United States, outside of North America its international locations licenses are still sold on a regional basis with franchises owning exclusive development rights for a region or country. These regional franchises are known as master franchises, and are responsible for opening new restaurants, licensing new third party operators, and performing standards oversight of all restaurant locations in these countries; one of the larger examples of a master franchise is Hungry Jack's, which oversees over 300 restaurants in Australia.

The 2011 purchase of the company by 3G Capital led to a change in how the company interacts with its franchises. The new owners moved to settle any disagreements with its franchises while initiating a sale of the majority of corporate locations with the goal of becoming an exclusive franchisor. The company also entered into several new franchise agreements that will allow it to dramatically expand its presence in several new markets including the BRIC nations. Additionally the company moved to establish new master franchise agreements in several regions while realigning its operations in several markets.

== History ==
The company known today as Burger King itself began as a franchise; the predecessor of the modern company was founded in 1953 in Jacksonville, Florida, as Insta-Burger King. The original founders and owners, Keith J. Kramer and Matthew Burns, opened their first stores around a piece of equipment known as the Insta-Broiler. The Insta-Broiler oven proved so successful at cooking burgers, Kramer and Burns required all of their franchises to carry the device. The rights to open stores in Miami, Florida, belonged to two businessmen named James McLamore and David R. Edgerton and their company: South Florida Restaurants, Inc. Due to operational issues with the Insta-Broiler, in 1954 McLamore and Edgarton made the decision to replace the Insta-Broiler with a mechanized gas grill they called a flame broiler. Even though the company had rapidly expanded throughout the state until its operations totaled more than 40 locations in 1955, the original Insta-Burger King ran into financial difficulties and the pair of McLamore and Edgarton purchased the national rights to the chain and rechristened the company as Burger King of Miami.

When McLamore and Edgarton's Burger King Corporation began a full franchising system in 1961, it relied on a regional franchising model where franchisees would purchase the right to open stores within a defined geographic region. These franchise agreements granted the company very little oversight control over its franchisees and resulted in issues of product quality control, store image and design and operations procedures.

In 1967, after eight years of private operation, the Pillsbury Company acquired the Burger King brand and its parent company Burger King Corporation. At the time of the purchase, the chain had grown to 274 restaurants in the United States. Pillsbury continued to grow the company utilizing the existing franchise system despite its flaws. The power of its independent franchises came to a head in 1973 when Chart House, owner of 350 restaurants and one of its largest franchise groups, attempted to purchase the chain from Pillsbury for $100 million (USD) which Pillsbury declined. When Chart House's bid failed, its owners Billy and Jimmy Trotter put forth a second plan that would require Pillsbury and Chart House spin off their respective holdings and merge the two entities into a separate company. Again Pillsbury declined the proposed divestiture. After the failed attempts to acquire the company, the relationship with Chart House and the Trotters soured; when Chart House purchased several restaurants in Boston and Houston in 1979, Burger King sued the selling franchisees for failing to comply with the right of first refusal clause in their contracts. Burger King won the case, successfully preventing the sale. The two parties did eventually reach a settlement where Chart House kept the Houston locations in their portfolio. Chart House eventually spun off its Burger King holdings and refocused on its higher end chains; its Burger King holding company, DiversiFoods, was eventually acquired by Pillsbury $390 million (USD) in 1984 and folded into Burger King's operations.

The regional licensing model remained in place until 1978 when the company hired McDonald's executive Donald N. Smith to help revamp the company. Smith initiated a restructuring of all future franchising agreements, disallowing new owners from living more than an hour's drive from their restaurants, preventing corporations from owning franchises and prohibiting franchisees from operating other chains. This new policy effectively limited the size of franchisees and prevented larger franchises from challenging Burger King as Chart House had. Smith also altered the way the company dealt with new properties by making the company the primary owner of new locations and rent or lease the restaurants to its franchises. This policy would allow the company to take over the operations of failing stores or evict those owners who would not conform to the company guidelines and policies. However, by 1988 Burger King parent Pillsbury had relaxed many of Smith's changes, scaled back on construction of new locations and stalling growth. When Pillsbury was acquired in 1989 by Grand Metropolitan, the company fell further into decline, a pattern which continued under Grand Met successor Diageo. This institutionalized neglect further hurt the standing of the brand, in turn causing significant financial damage to Burger King's franchises.

By 2001 and nearly eighteen years of stagnant growth, many of its franchises were in some sort of financial distress. The lack of growth severely impacted Burger King's largest franchise, the nearly 400-store AmeriKing; the company, which until this point had been struggling under a nearly $300 million debt load and been shedding stores across the US, was forced to enter Chapter 11 bankruptcy. The failure of AmeriKing accompanied with declining market position deeply affected the value of the company, and put negotiations between Diageo and the TPC Capital-lead group on hold. The developments eventually forced Diageo to lower the total selling price by almost three-quarters of a billion dollars. After the sale, newly appointed CEO Bradley Blum initiated a program to help the roughly 20 percent of its franchises, including its four largest, who were in financial distress, bankruptcy or had ceased operations altogether. Partnering with the California-based Trinity Capital, LLC, the company established the Franchisee Financial Restructuring Initiative, a program to address the financial issues facing BK's financially distressed franchisees. The initiative was designed to assist franchisees in restructuring their businesses in order to meet financial obligations, focus on restaurant operational excellence, reinvest in their operations and return to profitability.

Individual owners took advantage of the AmeriKing failure; one of the BK regional owners, Miami-based Al Cabrera, purchased 130 stores located primarily in the Chicago and the upper mid-west, from the failed company for a bargain basement price of $16 million, or approximately 88 percent of their original value. The new company, which started out as Core Value Partners and eventually became Heartland Foods, also purchased 120 additional stores from distressed owners and completely revamped them. The resulting purchases made Mr. Cabrerra BKB's largest minority franchisee and Heartland one of Burger King's top franchises. By 2006, the company was valued at over $150 million, and was sold to New York-based GSO Capital Partners. Other purchasers included a three-way group of NFL athletes Kevin Faulk, Marcus Allen and Michael Strahan who collectively purchased 17 stores in the cities of Norfolk and Richmond, Virginia; and Cincinnati-based franchisee Dave Devoy, who purchased 32 AmeriKing stores. After investing in new decor, equipment and staff retraining, many of the formerly failing stores have shown growth upwards of 20 percent.

With the sale of Burger King to 3G Capital of Brazil in 2010, Burger King made the decision to sell off almost all corporate owned stores to its franchises by the end of 2013. One major move towards this goal was the sale of over 275 stores to corporate franchise group Carrols Corporation of New York and nearly 100 stores to the minority held Magic Burger of Florida.

=== International ===
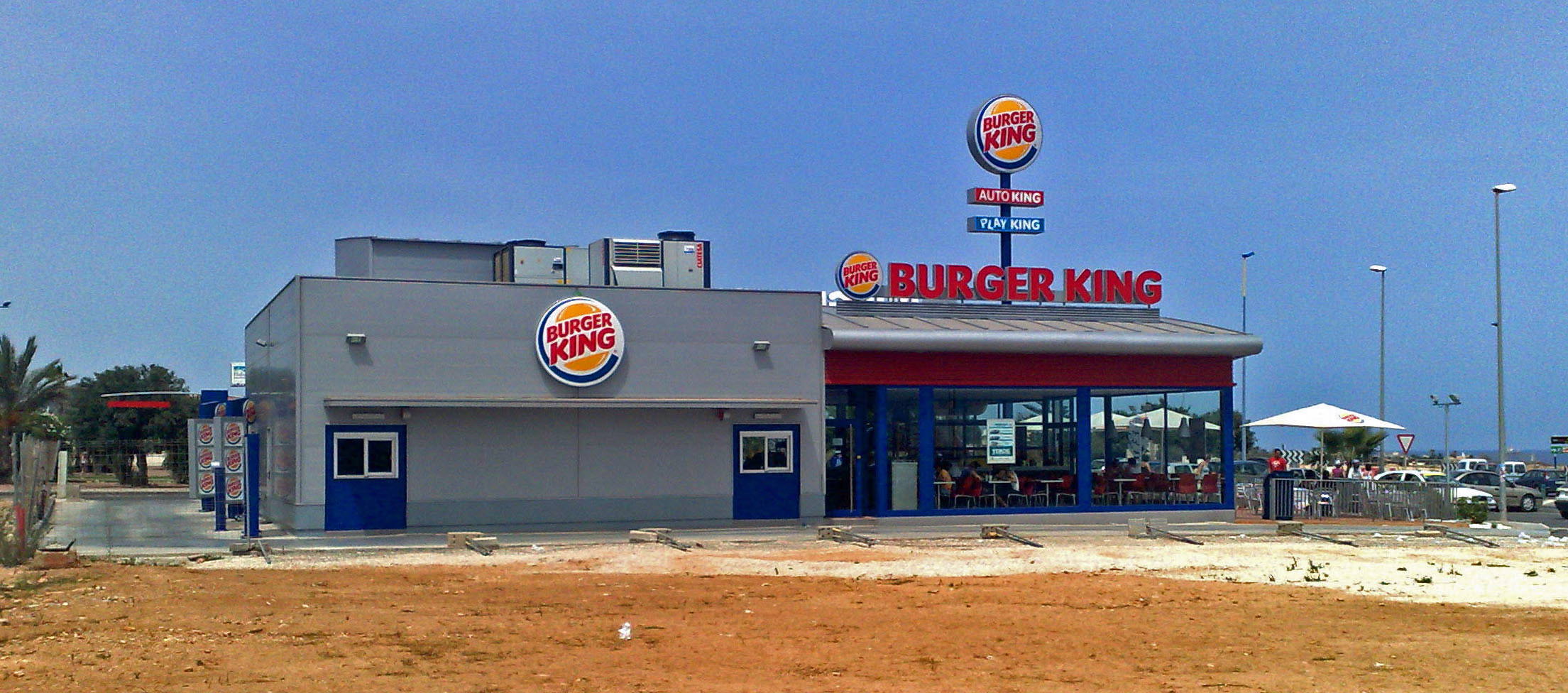
A Burger King restaurant with drive-thru, playground and terrace in Orihuela Costa, Spain. Spain was the location of the first continental European Burger King.

Shortly after the acquisition of the chain by Pillsbury in 1969, Burger King opened its first Canadian restaurant in Windsor, Ontario, in 1969. Other international locations followed soon after: Oceania in 1971 with its Australian franchise Hungry Jack's, and Europe in 1975 with a restaurant in Madrid, Spain. Beginning in 1982, BK and its franchisees began operating stores in several East Asian countries, including Japan, Taiwan, Singapore and South Korea. Due to high competition, all of the Japanese locations were closed in 2001; however, BK reentered the Japanese market in June 2007. BK's Central and South American operations began in Mexico in the late 1970s, and by the early 1980s it was operating locations in Caracas, Venezuela; Santiago, Chile; and Buenos Aires, Argentina. While Burger King lags behind McDonald's in international locations by over 12,000 stores, by 2008 it had managed to become the largest chain in several countries, including Mexico and Spain. The company divides its international operations into three segments: The Middle East, Europe and Africa division (EMEA), Asia-Pacific (APAC) and Latin America and the Caribbean (LAC). In each of these regions, Burger King has established several subsidiaries to develop strategic partnerships and alliances to expand into new territories. In its EMEA group, Burger King's Switzerland-based subsidiary Burger King Europe GmbH is responsible for the licensing and development of BK franchises in those regions. In the APAC region, the Singapore-based BK AsiaPac, Pte. Ltd. business unit handles franchising for East Asia, the Asian subcontinent and all Oceanic territories. The LAC region includes Mexico, Central and South America and the Caribbean Islands.

2012 saw a major international expansion initiative. The primary thrust was aimed at the BRIC nations with several new master franchise agreements in those countries that will eventually create upwards of 2500 new stores by the 2020. (Note: 1000+ locations in China, 1000+ in Brazil and 500+ in Russia. See citations below.) One of these deals also creates the single largest international franchise agreement in the company history, a deal to open over 1000 stores in China with a new "super"-franchise headed by the Kurdoglu family of Turkey. An updated agreement with its Russian franchisee will see a major expansion into Siberia. This move puts Burger King in a superior position to chief rival McDonald's as it currently doesn't operate any locations east of the Ural Mountains.

Further expansion moves were also made in other global markets during 2012. The African market saw a new agreement with JSE-Listed Grand Parade Investments of South Africa to enter Africa's largest economy, with restaurants opening in 2013. In Europe, Burger King returned to the French market in 2012 with an agreement with multinational operator Autogrill, a move that has met with some excitement in the country. The chain left the country in 1997, closing its 22 franchised and 17 corporate locations after a poorly executed entry into the market that left it unable to compete against McDonald's and local chain Quick. The partnership with Autogrill is a move to consolidate Burger King's presence in travel plazas along major highways in France, Italy, Poland and other European nations.

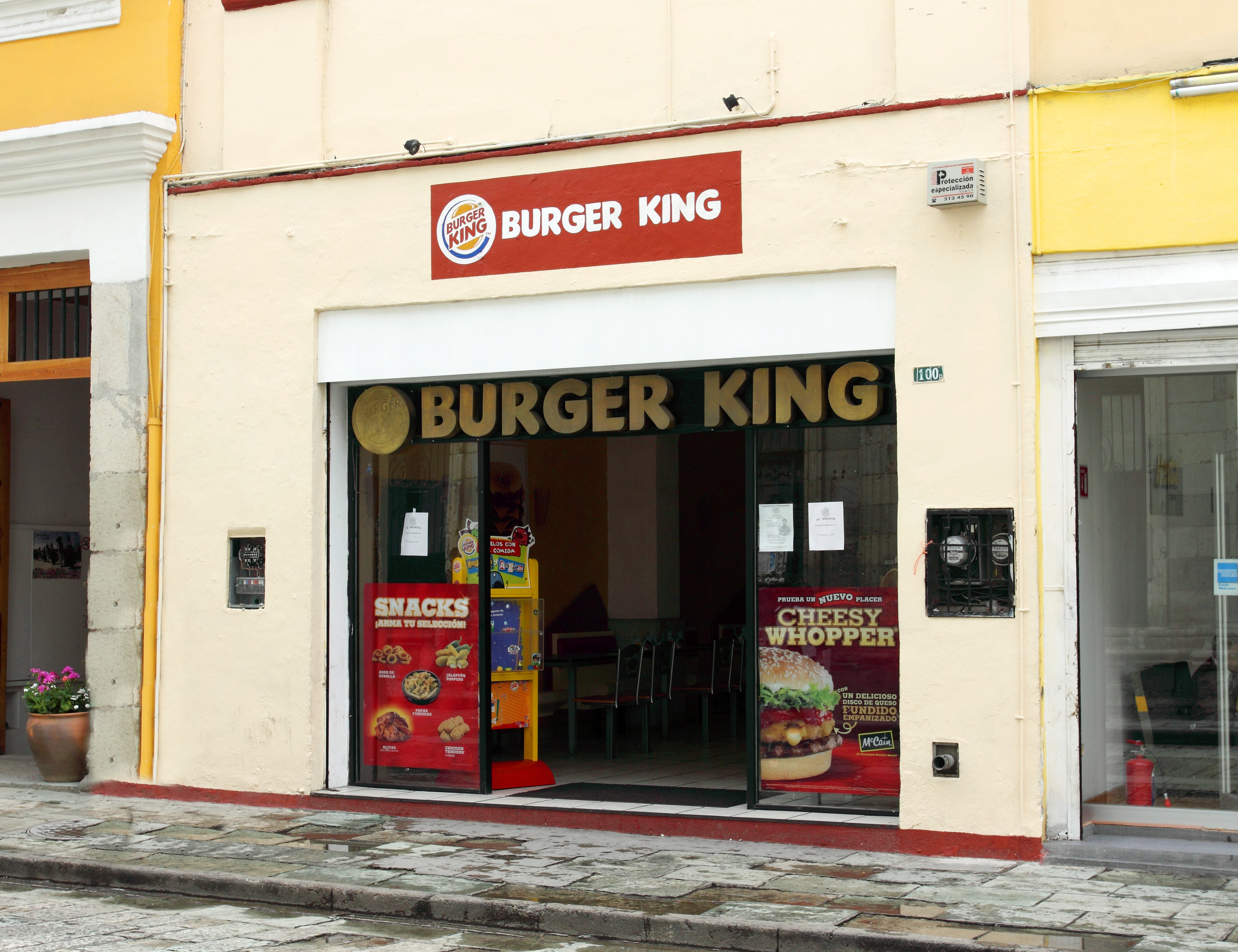
A Burger King located in the historic district of Oaxaca de Juarez, Oaxaca, Mexico

Since its purchase in 2011, Burger King has seen 14% sales increase in its Latin American and Caribbean operations. The continued expansion in these market could provide a significant portions of Burger King's growth during the decade of the 2010s. In the Mexican market, Burger King sold 97 corporate-owned locations to its largest franchisee in that country. The deal means multi-chain operator Alsea S.A.B. de C.V will eventually operate approximately half of Mexico's 400+ Burger King locations while receiving exclusive expansion rights in Mexico for a twenty-year period. Elsewhere in Central America, Burger King entered in a deal with another of its franchises, the Beboca Group of Panama, to create a new corporate entity to handle expansion and logistics in the LAC region which until this time had no centralized operations group. The deal follows a unification of the company's web presence in Latin America and the Caribbean, as well as aligning all of its various web initiatives including mobile services, Facebook presence and guest relation tools. The Latin American moves are part of a corporate plan to take advantage of the growing middle class in these regions.

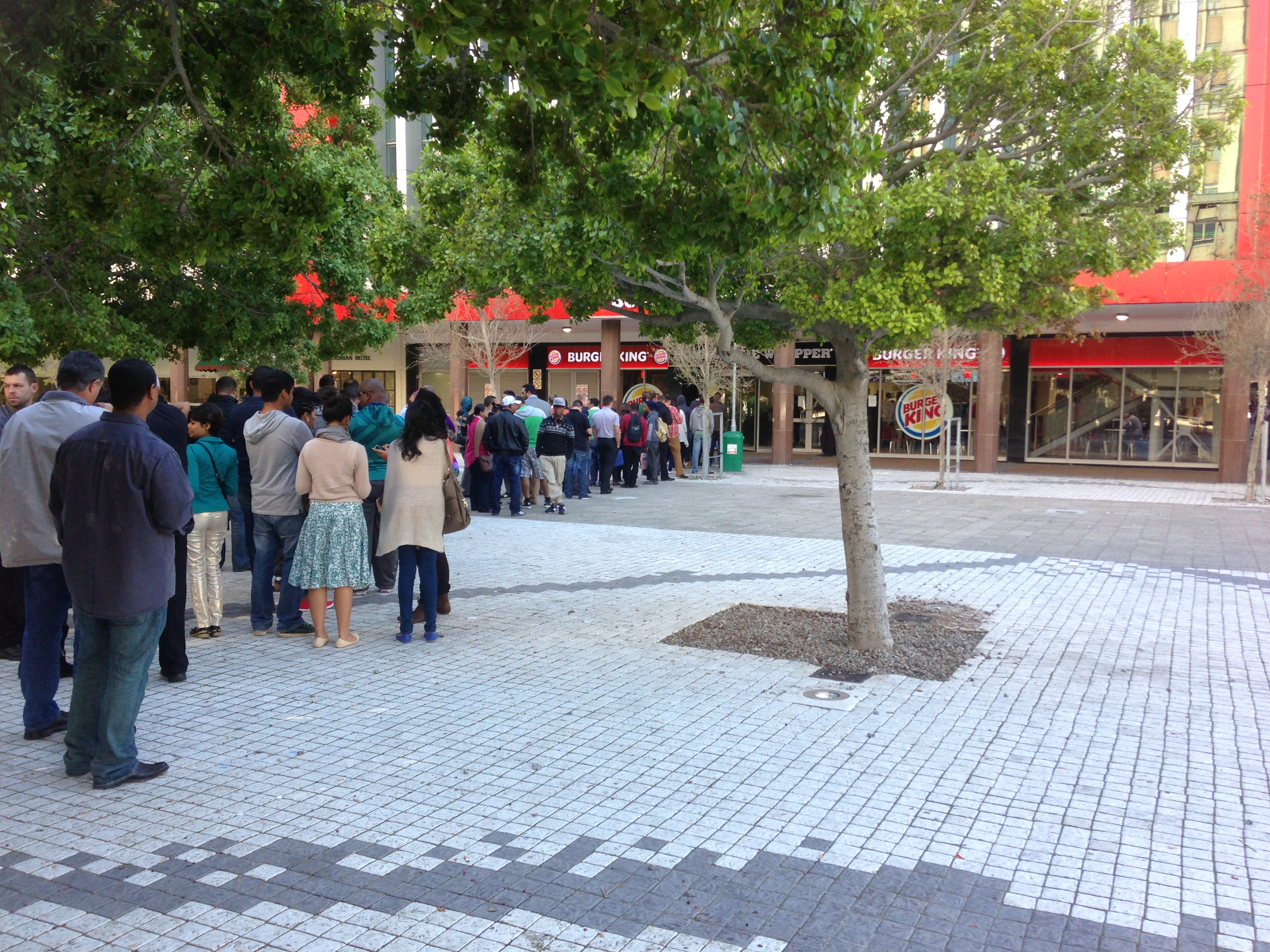
The line outside the Burger King in Heerengracht Street, Foreshore, Cape Town, South Africa on opening day. It was one of the first Burger Kings to open in the country when it opened in May 2013.

The company began its move into Sub-Saharan Africa in May 2013 when Burger King opened its first outlet in Cape Town South Africa. The company sold franchise rights to local gaming and slots machine operator Grand Parade Investments Ltd. The South African operation sold over double its initial forecasts in its opening weeks with sales of $474,838 at just one of its outlets in Cape Town in its first seven weeks. In a deal with local petrochemical company Sasol outlets will be opened at filling stations across the country from 2014. In April 2014 it was announced that due to high demand the number of new outlets being opened in 2014 would be increased from 12 to 14 across the country.

In December 2013, Burger King returned to Finland after three decades of absence. The first restaurant, located on Mannerheimintie in central Helsinki, instantly proved so popular that for every day since its opening, people have had to queue in front of the restaurant to get in, sometimes for over half an hour. The only exception so far has been Christmas time, when the restaurant was closed. According to Mikko Molberg, the leader of the Finnish Burger King franchise, the restaurant has attracted over 2000 customers on every single day, which has surprised the restaurant employees and the franchise owners. The long queues have been extensively covered and ridiculed in social media, comparing them to people queuing in front of a McDonald's restaurant in Moscow, Russia in the early 1990s, and contrasting them with the nearly nonexistent queues to Burger King restaurants in Stockholm, Sweden.

== Relations ==
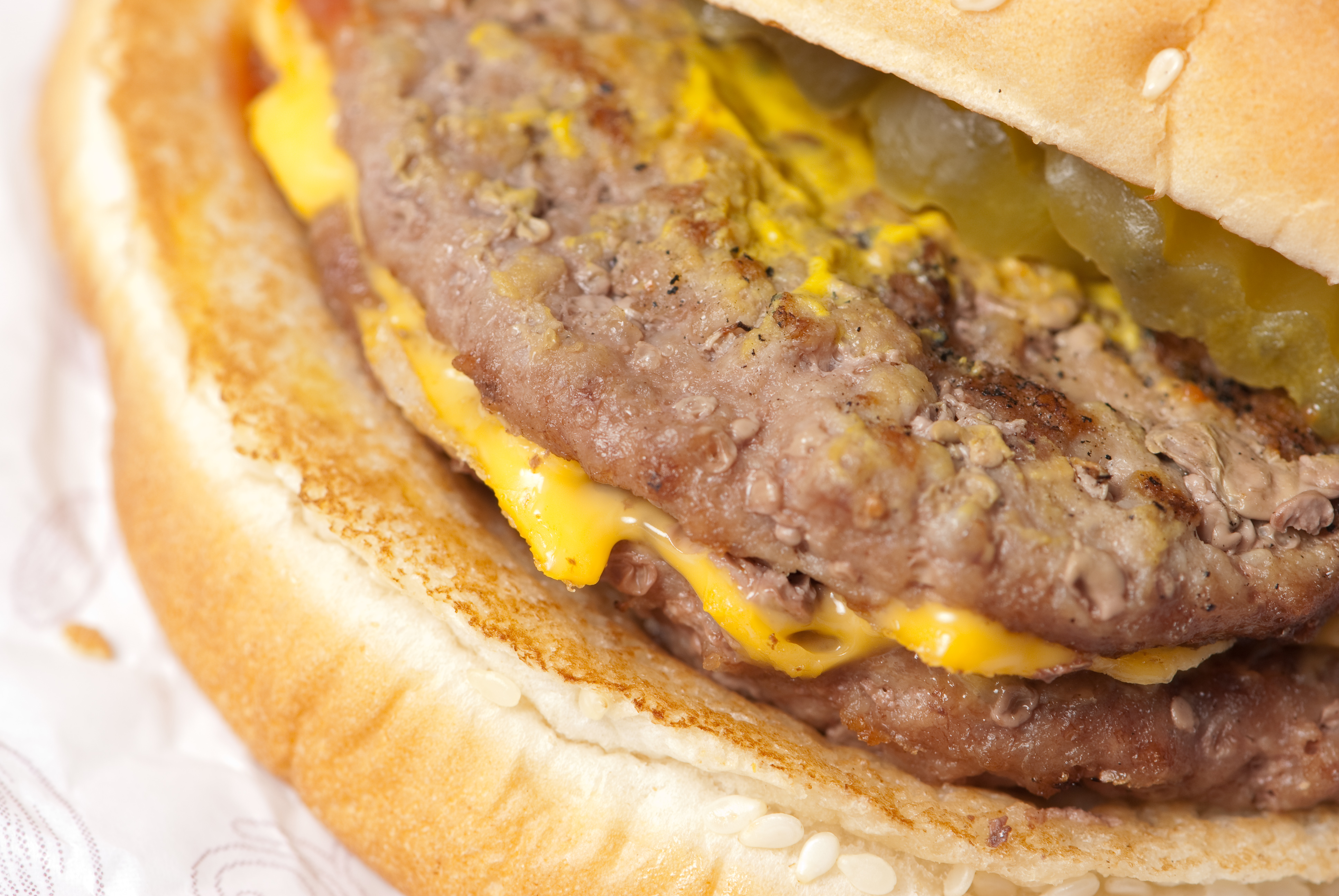
The Burger King Buck Double sandwich, one object of a disagreement between Burger King and its American franchises over food pricing

Although the majority of the restaurant locations are privately held by individual owners and its financial dependence on those owners, Burger King's relationship with its franchises has not always been harmonious. Occasional disagreements between the two have caused numerous issues, and in several instances the company's and its licensees' relations have degenerated into precedent-setting court cases.

=== United States ===
In the United States, approximately 90 percent of Burger King's franchises have banded together to form the Burger King National Franchise Association (BKNFA or NFA). The 900-member group is based in Atlanta, Georgia, and is designed to provide what the group calls Franchisee Relations Advocacy. It acts as a corporate negotiator that mediates with corporate-franchise disputes, as a government lobbying group to deal with issues that affect the fast-food industry as a whole, and it provides group health, property and casualty insurance. In 2001, the group announced a plan to purchase Burger King from then-parent Diageo after the company put forth a plan to float approximately 20 percent of BKC on the NYSE. The NFA believed that any money raised from the issue would not be put into helping bolster the then flagging BK, but would instead end up being used to help Diageo bolster its liquor brands. The deal collapsed when the NFA was unable to put together an acceptable financing package.

When an agreement to purchase Burger King by a group led by TPG Capital was initially reached in 2002, franchises celebrated the severance of Burger King from Diageo. However, the relationship quickly soured after the 2004 purchase was completed, with the TPG-led management group immediately voicing concerns over the relationship between Burger King and its franchises. In a statement from the new TPG appointed management, Burger King disparaged the NFA as one of the problems interfering with company operations. The new owners also began dismantling franchise advisory committees, replacing them with what Burger King called "excellence advisory councils" that the NFA claimed was made up of corporate picked members that did not truly represent the franchises. Further changes in menu structure, advertising, demographic targeting and franchise-corporate interactions upset the franchise group. Over the next several years TPG made several changes to the company that eventually brought the two sides to loggerheads that devolved into several lawsuits.

==== Advertising revenues ====
In a 2005 dispute with the NFA over issues including brand development and advertising, Burger King severed its relations with the group. Claiming that the NFA was resisting structural changes that BK was making in regards to pricing, hours and its new gift card program, CEO John Chindsey claimed "many instances of the NFA's non-cooperation and affirmative disruption of efforts to improve the Burger King system" were the reason for the break. The company also announced that it would be diverting a $1 million (USD) NFA advertising subsidy into the company's own advertising fund. In a response, the NFA chairman Daniel Fitzpatrick responded in a letter to Burger King's parent stating that "to sever relations with the ... NFA is extremely regrettable" and based on "an erroneous set of facts, innuendo and rumor" claimed that the company owed the NFA $1.7 million in total subsidy funds. The two sides settled their differences in April 2006 when Burger King agreed to pay the disputed subsidy funds to the group. Additionally, Burger King announced that it would honor an October 2004 deal in regards to compensation for the operation of the annual Burger King/franchise convention.

A similar issue again arose in 2009 when Burger King diverted several million dollars of advertising rebates paid to its American franchises by Coca-Cola Corporation and Dr. Pepper Snapple Group to its own coffers. The company intended to utilize these funds to increase its advertising presence in the United States at a time when corporate advertising costs were falling, which would allow an increased media presence of approximately 25% from the previous year (2008). The NFA contended that Burger King Corporation improperly redirected 40% of restaurant operating funds (ROF) paid by the two beverage suppliers to franchises since 1990 into the corporate advertising budget. These funds were often used by the franchises to pay for beverage support systems such as filtration units and local marketing, and diversion of the funds would cost franchises at least $65 million (USD) between 2010 and 2012. These funds often helped the franchises' bottom lines, as they were often used to offset other costs imposed on the franchises by Burger King, such as the $1 (USD) Double Cheeseburger.

The NFA claimed that the diversion to the parent company violated the beverage contracts between various parties. Negotiations between the two entities eventually failed, which led to a class action suit being filed in the United States District Court for the Southern District of California against Burger King Corporation, Coca-Cola and Dr. Pepper on behalf of all Burger King franchises in the United States in May 2009. In the filing, the NFA claimed the three defendants were in violation of a 1999 beverage contract that set specific beverage syrup usage goals. The four parties settled shortly after the filing when Burger King agreed to seek advertising funds from other sources.

==== Hours of operation ====
In 2007, Burger King announced its "competitive hours" requirement that mandated locations extend their hours of operation to midnight for most of its American locations. Burger King's reasoning for the changes were necessary to maintain a competitive stand against McDonald's and Wendy's. Burger King stated that roughly 60% of its franchised locations already operated until midnight, but it sought to have the extended hours of operation cover 100% of locations in order to begin a nationwide advertising campaign promoting late-night sales. On June 1, 2008, the company amended the directive to require restaurants to stay open until 2:00am Thursday-Saturday and open at 6:00am Monday-Saturday. At the time of the announcement, Burger King stated it believed the franchise agreement allowed it set minimum hours and that most of it franchisees had agreed to the extended hours of operation. After the deadline passed, Burger King notified its franchises on July 3 that if any of them failed to implement the new policy by July 8, the franchises would be in default of their agreement.

Many franchises opposed the extensions on multiple grounds; operators claimed employee and customer safety was jeopardized by the extended hours, with several Miami-area franchises noting incidents in 2006 and 2007 where staff or customers were killed during extended hours. Additionally it was claimed that the extended hours were not profitable due increased costs associated with operating the locations at times with lower customer traffic and subsequent lower sales. Franchises and the NFA noted the franchise agreement only required locations to be open until 11:00pm and did not contain riders that allowed the corporate parent to amend the agreement. In response to the changes, three Miami-area franchise filed a suit in July 2008 with the Eleventh Judicial Circuit Court of Florida in Miami to stop the change and force the company to make it optional instead of required. The NFA issued a statement that it "unequivocally supported" the suit, and that "...the franchisor does not have the enforceable right to mandate extended hours."

Circuit Judge Jon I. Gordon dismissed the lawsuit without prejudice in November requesting the plaintiffs refile with a clarified complaint. An amended complaint was filed by the three franchises a month later. In response to a motion to dismiss filed by the parent company, the judge ruled in January 2009 in favor of Burger King. In his decision, Judge Gordon stated that the franchise contract clearly does provide Burger King the right to establish minimum hours standards for its franchises. After purchase of the company by 3G, Burger King conceded to the franchises request the mandate be changed to a recommendation and relaxed its position on the extended hours.

==== Value menu pricing ====
The pricing of Burger King's value menu had been the focus of multiple, highly contentious disputes between the parent company and its franchises for several years during the TPG ownership period. The dispute was at the center of two separate but related court cases filed against Burger King by an individual Burger King franchise in New York City and the NFA. At the heart of the disputes is the legal concept of the implied covenant of good faith and fair dealing in regards to long-term franchise agreements.

The first indication of the franchises' displeasure with their parent over this issue came in 2005 and involved claims by a Manhattan-based franchise that the company failed to take into account local market conditions when setting prices. E-Z Eating Corp., operator of five restaurants in New York and owned by brother-sister partners Elizabeth and Luan Sadik, had been struggling after the 9/11 terrorist attacks but had been in a company-sponsored turn around program when Burger King started its new value program in 2006. The program required all locations to carry a specific set of products at a discounted price, with limited exemptions for certain locations that met a set of criteria. The Sadiks applied for an exemption to the pricing requirement but were turned down by Burger King. In response to the denial, the Sadiks closed two of their locations without consulting Burger King and refused to implement the scheme in their other two locations. Burger King responded by suing the company in the United States District Court for the Southern District of Florida for breach of contract, and eventually revoked the franchise agreement for the remaining two locations in January 2006. The Sadik's responded by filing their own lawsuit in 2008 in the United States District Court for the Eastern District of New York claiming that Burger King had engaged in a breach of the implied duty of good faith and fair in its actions towards the franchise. The actions were eventually consolidated in a single case in the Southern District Court under Judge Maricia G. Cooke, where Burger King requested and was granted a summary judgement against the Sadiks. The judgment was upheld on appeal by the United States Court of Appeals for the Eleventh Circuit in June 2009.

Eventually, the dispute between Burger King and its franchises came to center on the 2009-2010 promotion for the Buck Double sandwich. The Buck Double was a quarter-pound double cheese burger designed to compete against the McDonald's McDouble sandwich. The primary issue was financial in nature, the franchises claimed that Burger King forced them to sell the sandwich at a loss of 10¢ per sandwich. Franchisees sued the parent company claiming that it did not have the authority to dictate pricing structures for the independently held franchises. The court dismissed the case in a decision that stated the company could legally dictate pricing structures over its franchises objections, but found that there was enough evidence to allow the franchises to move forward with their claims of dealing in bad faith in a separate case. In response to the decision, the franchise group filed a second suit that claimed the deal was not properly structured and was implemented without the franchises' consent. The NFA suit claimed BK acted in bad faith by implementing the deal after the franchises had twice voted down the deal.

When 3G Capital purchased Burger King in January 2011, the company moved to resolve all disputes with its franchises. By April, Burger King and the franchises agreed to a non-monetary settlement where the franchise were allowed to reprice the Buck Double to $1.29 US$ as well as giving them more power in future in determining the makeup of the Burger King value menu. The parent company also hired a Chicago, Illinois franchisee, Dan Wiborg, as its new North American president, a move that helped franchise relations due to his former position with the NFA.

=== International relations ===
==== Australia ====
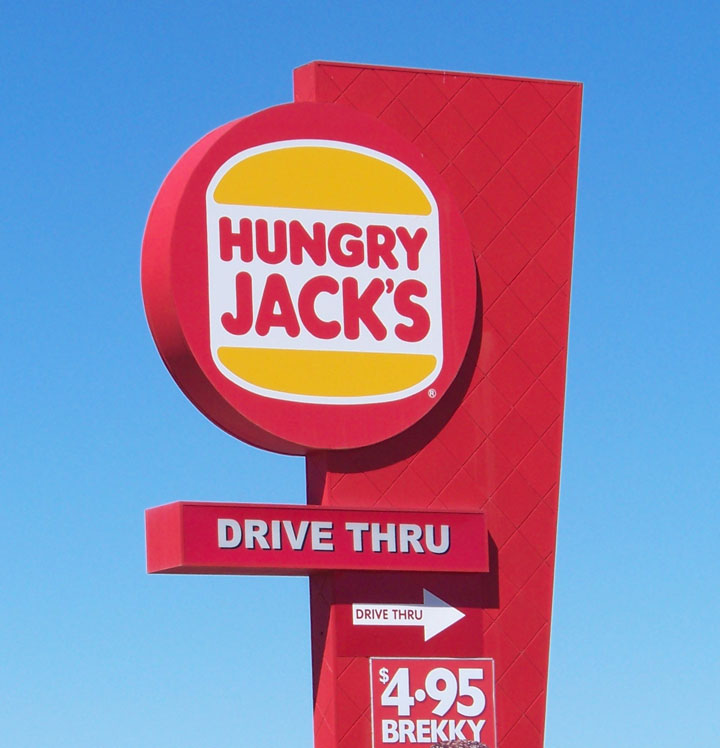
A Hungry Jack's sign for the location in Bathurst, New South Wales

In 1990, Hungry Jack's renewed its franchise agreement with then BK parent Burger King Corporation, which allowed Hungry Jack's to license third party franchisee. One of the terms and conditions of the renewed agreement required Hungry Jack's to open a minimum number of new locations each year for the duration of the contract. Shortly after the Australian trademark on the Burger King name lapsed in 1996, Burger King requested that Cowin rebrand the Hungry Jack's locations to Burger King, which Cowin declined. Burger King Corporation accused Hungry Jack's of violating the conditions of the renewed franchise agreement by failing to expand the chain at the rate defined and sought to terminate the agreement. Under the aegis of this claim, Burger King Corporation, in partnership with Royal Dutch Shell's Australian division Shell Company of Australia Ltd., began to open its own stores in 1997 beginning in Sydney and extending throughout the regions of New South Wales, Australian Capital Territory and Victoria. In addition, BK sought to limit HJ's ability to open new locations in the country, whether they were corporate locations or third-party licensees.

As a result of Burger King's actions, Hungry Jack's owner Jack Cowin and his private holding company Competitive Foods Australia began legal proceedings in 2001 against Burger King's parent Burger King Corporation with a counter-claim that the company had violated the conditions of the master franchising agreement and was in breach of the contract. In a decision handed down by the Supreme Court of New South Wales that affirmed Cowin's claims, Burger King was determined to have violated the terms of the contract and as a result was required to pay Cowin and Hungry Jack's a $46.9 million (Aus, $41.6 million USD 2001) award. The court's decision was one of the first major cases in Australia that implied that the American legal concept of good faith negotiations existed with the framework of the Australian legal system, which until that verdict, had rarely been seen in the country's courts. In its decision, the Court stated that Burger King had failed to act in good faith during contract negotiations by seeking to include standards and clauses that would engineer a default of the franchise agreement, allowing the company to limit the number of new Hungry Jack's branded restaurants and ultimately claim the Australian market as its own, a purpose that was extraneous to the agreement.

After Burger King Corporation lost the case, it decided to terminate its operations in the country, and in July 2002, the company transferred its assets to its New Zealand franchise group, Trans-Pacific Foods (TPF). The terms of the sale had TPF assume oversight of the Burger King franchises in the region as the Burger King brand's master franchisee. Trans-Pacific Foods administered the chain's 81 locations until September 2003 when the new management team of Burger King Corporation reached an agreement with Hungry Jack's Pty Ltd to re-brand the existing Burger King locations to Hungry Jack's and make HJP the sole master franchisee of both brands. An additional part of the agreement required Burger King Corporation to provide administrative and advertising support as to insure a common marketing scheme for the company and its products. Trans-Pacific Foods transferred its control of the Burger King franchises to Hungry Jack's Pty Ltd, which subsequently renamed the remaining Burger King locations as Hungry Jack's.

==== Israel and Palestinian Territories ====
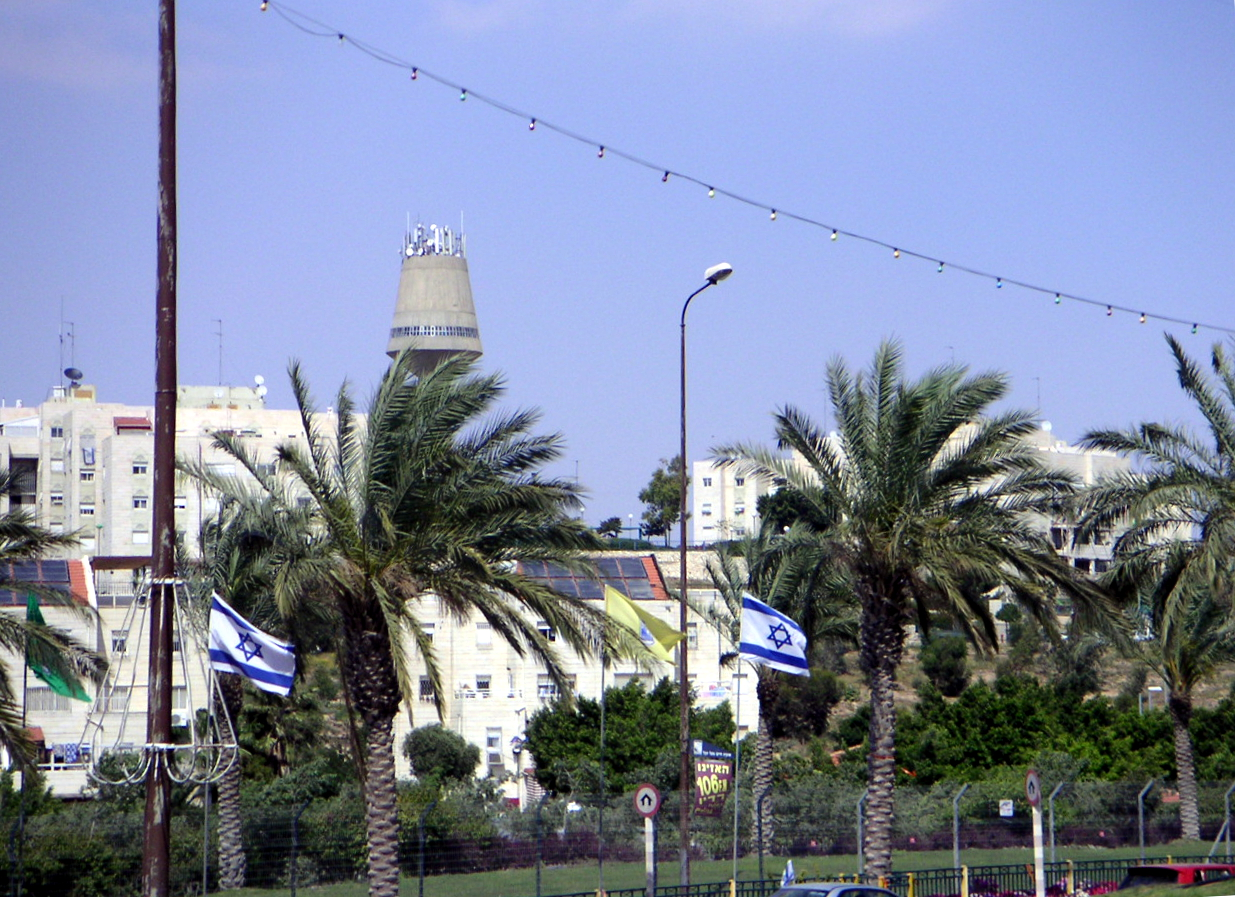
A view of the Ma'aleh Adumim settlement

In the summer of 1999, a geopolitical dispute with the global Islamic community and Jewish groups in the United States and Israel arose over an Israeli franchisee opening stores in the territories. When Burger King franchisee in Israel, Rikamor, Ltd., opened a store in the settlement of Ma'aleh Adumim in August of that year, Islamic groups, including the Arab League and American Muslims for Jerusalem, argued that international Burger King parent Burger King Corporation's licensing of the store helped legitimize the settlement. Beyond the called-for Islamic boycott of the company, the Arab League also threatened the revocation of the business licenses of Burger King's primary Middle Eastern franchise in the 22 countries that are part of the League's membership.

Burger King Corporation quickly pulled the franchise license for that location and had the store shuttered explaining that Rikamor, Ltd. had violated its contract by opening the location in the West Bank. Several American-based Jewish groups issued statements that denounced the decision as acceding to threats of boycotts by Islamic groups. Burger King Corporation issued a statement that it "made this decision purely on a commercial basis and in the best interests of thousands of people who depend on the Burger King reputation for their livelihood".

Eventually, the regional master franchise for Israel, Orgad Holdings, decided to close its operations in that country and merge all operations with its own local chain, Burgeranch. It was claimed by Ograd owners Eli and Yuval Orgad that Israelis preferred the taste of the local brand over the American chain. One blogger, a former manager of a Burger King in the United States, claimed that both chains were basically the same in product and preparations, it was Burger King's failure to fully adapt to the local market tastes that doomed them in that country. By September 6, 2010, all 55 locations in the country were closed down and converted to Burgeranches.

In 2013, it was announced that the chain had attempts to reenter the Israeli market, and in February 2016, a new branch was opened in Rabin Square in Tel Aviv.

== Franchisees of note ==
=== Australia ===
Master franchise: Hungry Jack's Pty.

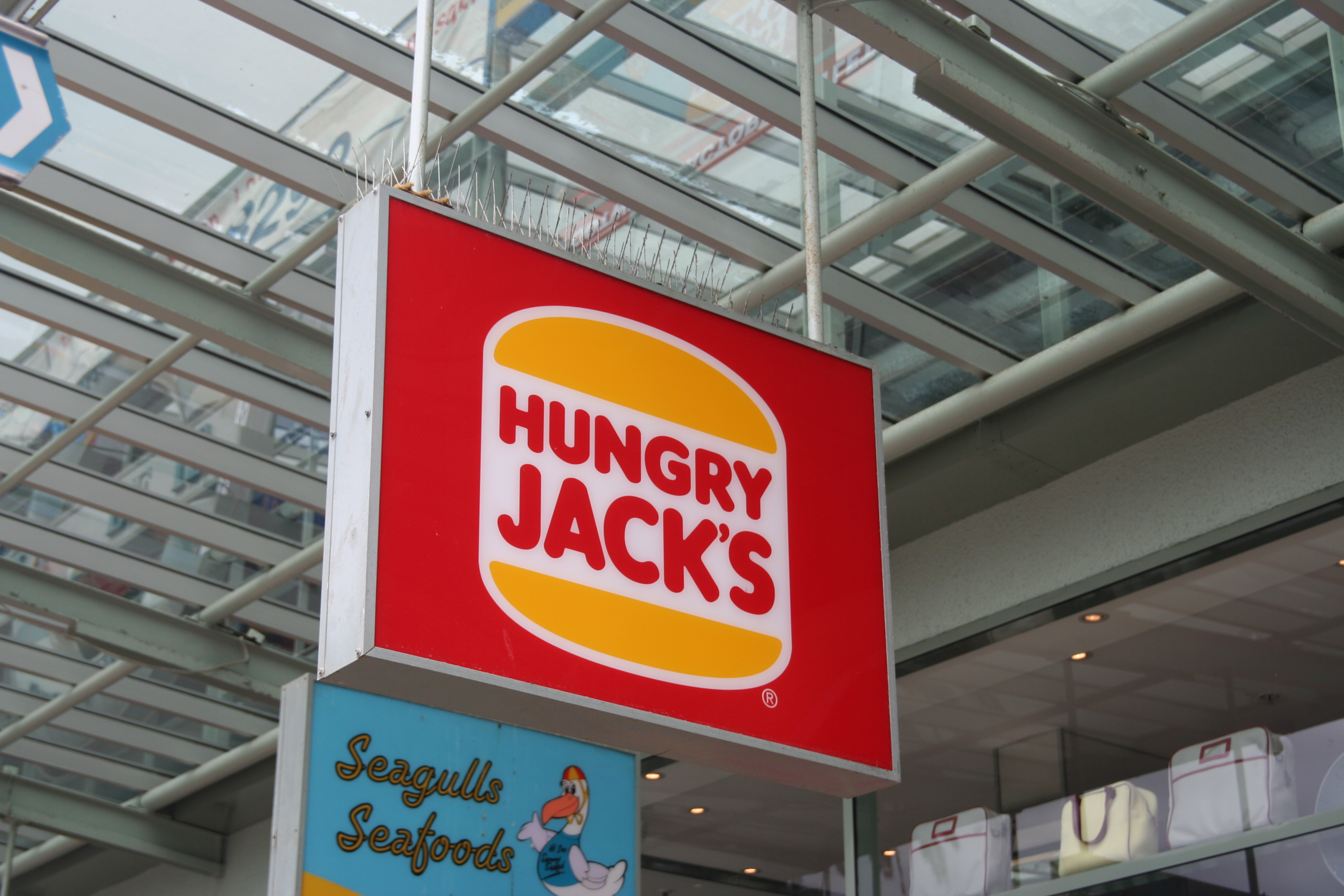
A Hungry Jack's sign for a restaurant located in Sydney

Australia is the only country in which Burger King does not operate under its own name. When the company set about establishing operations there in 1971, it found that its business name was already trademarked by a takeaway food shop in Adelaide. As a result, Burger King provided the Australian master franchisee, Jack Cowin, with a list of possible alternative names derived from pre-existing trademarks already registered by Burger King and its then corporate parent Pillsbury, that could be used to name the Australian restaurants. Cowin selected the "Hungry Jack" brand name, one of Pillsbury's US pancake mixture products, and slightly changed the name to a possessive form by adding an apostrophe "s" forming the new name Hungry Jack's.

Hungry Jack's currently owns, operates or sub-licenses all of the Hungry Jack's restaurants in Australia. As the master franchise for the continent, the company is responsible for licensing new operators, opening its own stores and performing standards oversight of franchised locations in Australia. At the end of Burger King's 2012 fiscal year, Hungry Jack's is the largest Asian/Pacific franchisee of the chain with 347 restaurants either directly owned by parent company Hungry Jack's Pty or through third party licensees.

After the expiration of the trademark in the late 1990s, Burger King unsuccessfully tried to introduce the brand to the continent. After losing a lawsuit filed against it by Hungry Jack's ownership, the company ceded the territory to its franchisee. Hungry Jack's is now the only Burger King brand in Australia; Cowin's company Hungry Jack's PTY is the master franchise and thus is now responsible for overseeing the operations in Australia, with Burger King only providing administrative and advertising support to ensure a common marketing scheme for the company and its products.

=== Brazil ===
Master franchise: Vinci Partners

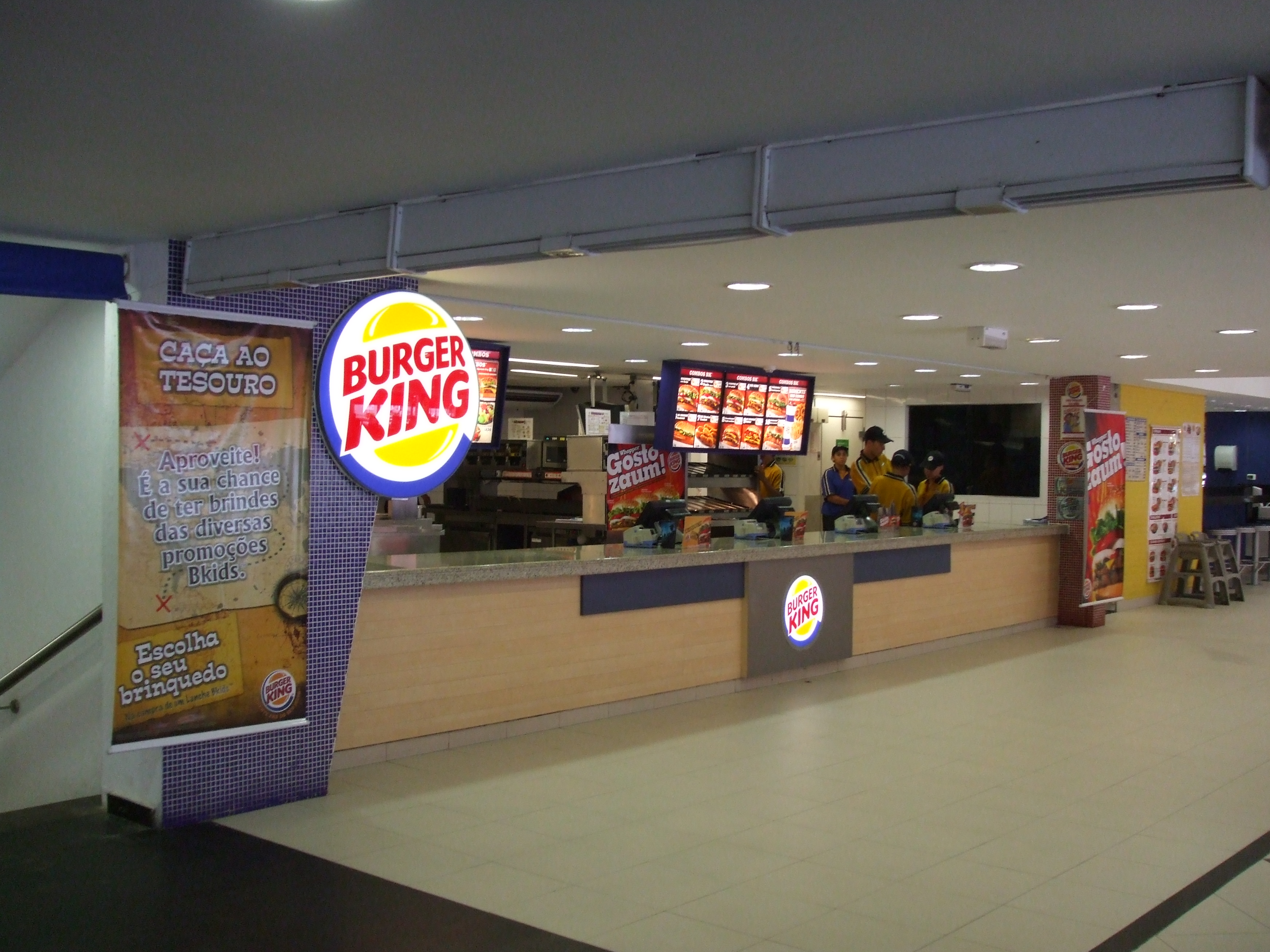
Burger King in Guarujá, Brazil

Burger King entered the Brazilian market in 2004, eventually operating and franchising 108 locations in the country by 2011. In June of that year, Burger King entered into a new master franchise agreement with Brazilian venture capital firm Vinci Partners. The agreement calls for a tenfold increase in locations in the country by 2016. Burger King and Vinci are expected to invest about $570 million (US$) to expand operations in the country during the five-year period. The expansion deal is an attempt to catch up to American chains that have already established a presence in Brazil as well as the rest of Latin America.

=== China ===
Master franchise: the Kurdoğlu family
Chinese: 汉堡王 (lit. Hamburger King)

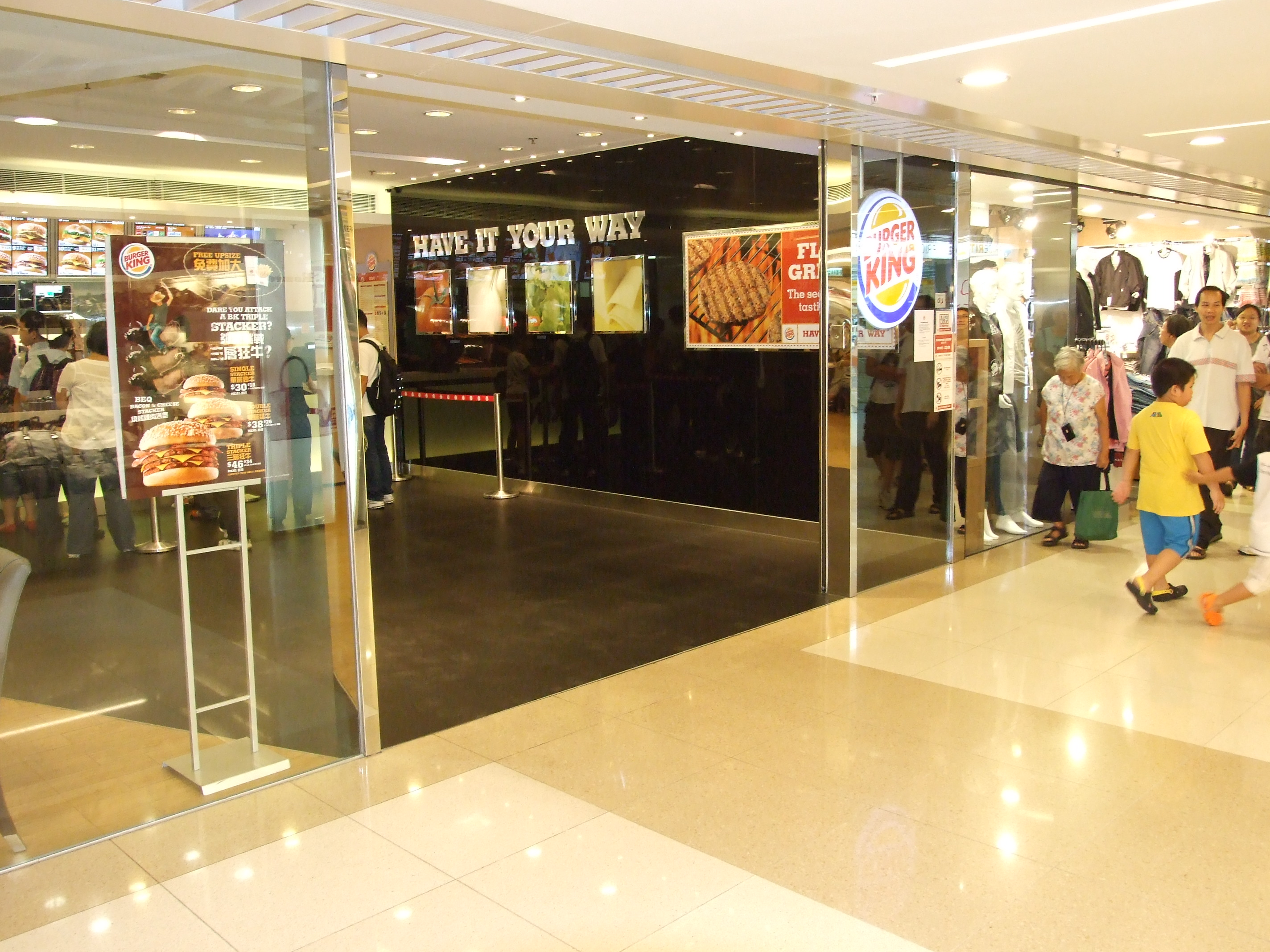
A Burger King located at the Wong Tai Sin Centre in Hong Kong

Through 2012, Burger King lagged significantly behind McDonald's (1400 locations in China) and Yum! Brands (4500 KFC and Pizza Hut locations in China) in the Chinese market, operating less than 100 stores in the country. Previous owners TPG Capital had intended to open hundreds of new locations in the country by this point but had not been able to follow through with their plans. On the other side of Aisia, the Kurdoğlu family, along with its partners the Üründül family, operated a major franchisee of Burger King In Turkey through its TAB Gida operation. TAB Gida is Turkey's largest multi-brand restaurant operator and one of the largest Burger King franchisees in Europe with 450 locations in that country. The previous year, the Cartesian Capital Group had taken a minority stake in TAB Gida, giving TAB Gida access to additional capital for growth in Turkish market.

In April 2012, the Kurdoğlus and Cartesian entered into a franchise agreement with Burger King to open 1,000+ new locations in China over a five- to seven-year period. This agreement was the largest single franchise agreement in the history of Burger King and would make the new Chinese venture the largest Burger King franchise in the world. The agreement gave the new franchise group control of the existing 63 locations in the country. The deal could allow Burger King to position itself as a more upscale competitor akin to Starbucks.

In January 2014, Burger King continued its expansion by beating McDonald's to China's western province of Xinjiang, opening up a store in the capital city of Ürümqi.

=== Multinational ===
==== Central and South America ====
Master franchise: Beboca Ltd.

While Burger King has had operations in Central and South America for several years, they were under the auspices of different companies. In December 2012, Burger King entered into a new agreement with Beboca Ltd., a franchisee in Panama and Costa Rica. The new agreement establishes a new entity, BK Centro America (BKCA), that will be the new master franchise for Costa Rica, El Salvador, Guatemala, Honduras, Nicaragua and Panama; BKCA will be responsible for overseeing the development of Burger King franchisees in these countries. Additionally, BKCA will provide logistics support, advertising and purchasing assistance not only in those countries, but others in Burger King's Latin American and Caribbean development area.

==== Central and Eastern Europe ====
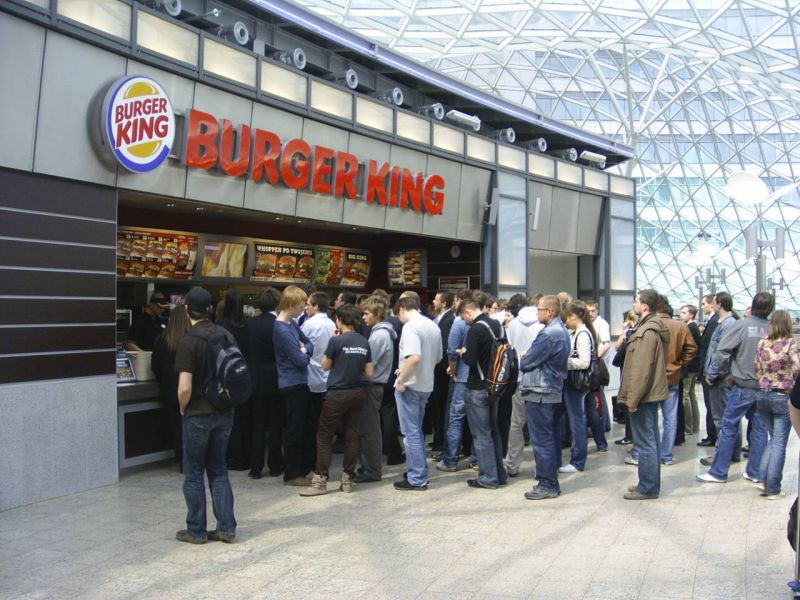
A Burger King located at Złote Tarasy in Warsaw, Poland

AmRest Holdings (WSE: EAT) is an international fast-food and casual dining restaurant operator. The company is primarily based in Wrocław and operates in Poland, the Czech Republic, Hungary, Russia, Bulgaria, Romania, Serbia, Croatia, Spain, France and the United States. In 2007, AmRest received its license to operate Burger Kings in Poland through BK's Burger King Europe GmbH holding unit. The new license was part of Burger King's plan to expand its presence in existing European markets while opening new ones. AmRest expected to open several new locations in Poland over a five-year period. By February 2012, the company was considering using its foothold in India through its La Tagliatella Italian food chain to bring the Burger King brand to that country. At the time, BK had failed to establish itself with in India at least twice. As of December 2012, AmRest operates 37 Burger King locations in three countries.

In early 2022, Burger King terminated its franchising contract with AmRest, which means no new Burger King would open in Central and Eastern Europe.

==== India and Indonesia ====
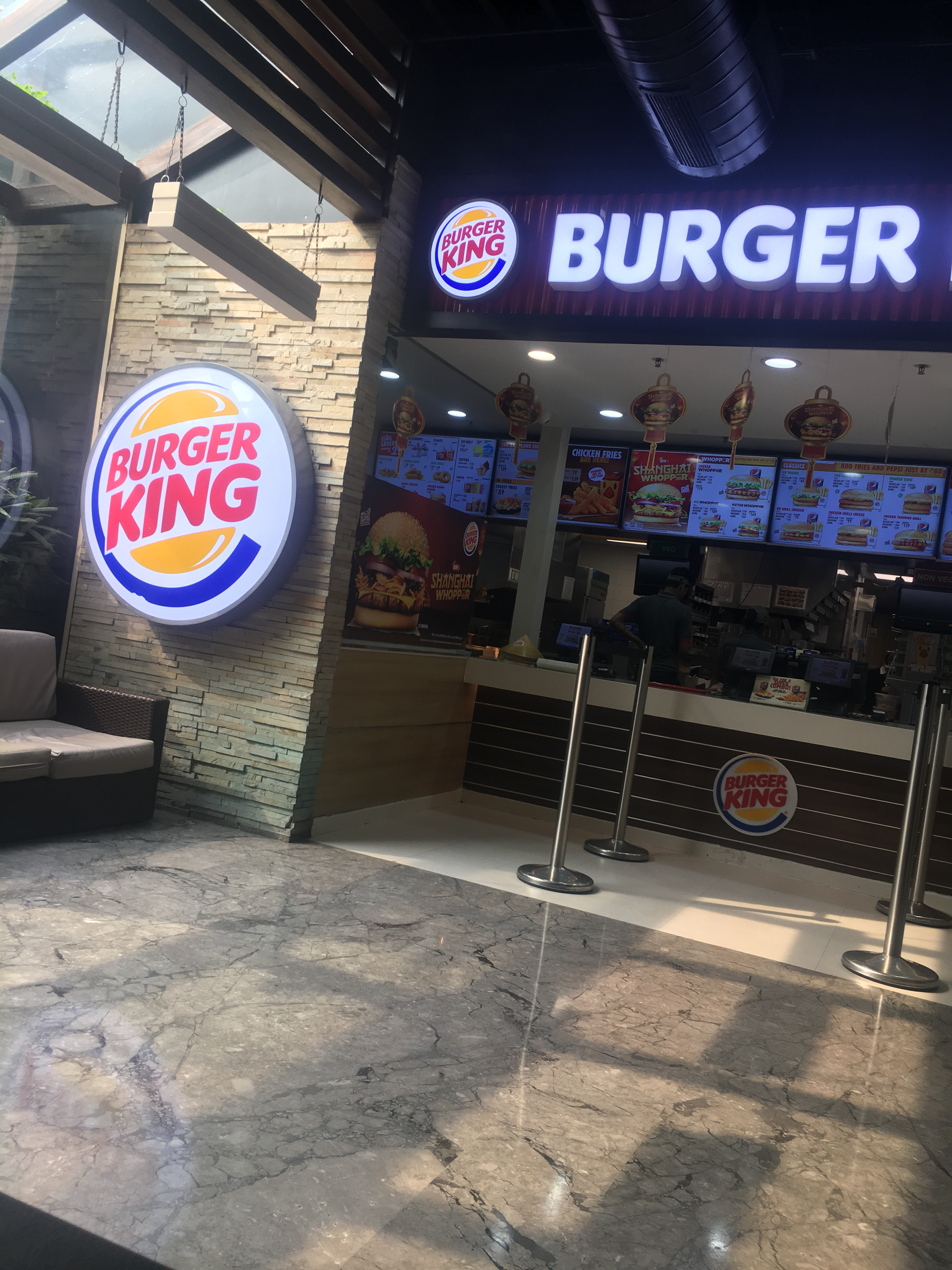
A Burger King in Delhi, India

Restaurant Brands Asia (NSE: RBA) is an Indian quick-service restaurant company which is the master franchisee for Burger King in India and Indonesia. It was established in 2013 as a partnership between Everstone Capital Asia and Burger King Worldwide to open Burger King restaurants in India. The company launched its initial public offering in 2020 and listed on the National Stock Exchange of India and Bombay Stock Exchange. Everstone Capital holds 40.9% stake in the company. In 2021, the company expanded to Indonesia after acquiring a 83.24% stake in PT Sari Burger Indonesia (Burger King Indonesia) at an enterprise value of US$183 million.

As of December 2022, it operates a combined 558 Burger King restaurants, with 379 being in India and 179 being In Indonesia. In addition, it operates 252 BK Cafés in India.

==== The Middle East ====
Master franchise: Hana International
Arabic: برجر كنج

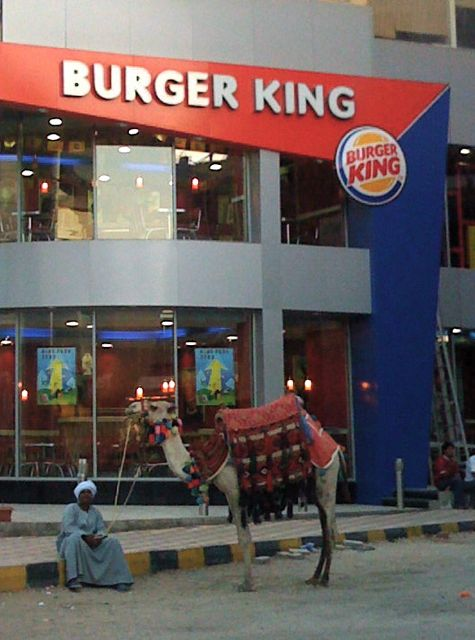
A Olyan Group owned Burger King restaurant located in Egypt

Hana International, a wholly owned subsidiary of the Saudi Arabia-based Olayan Group and its partner Kuwait-based MH Alshaya Group, is the exclusive master franchisee for the Middle East and North Africa, excluding Israel and Turkey. Hana also operates two holding companies, the Olayan Food Services Company in Saudi Arabia and First Food Services Company in the UAE as well as an operations support/training center in Riyadh.

Hana first began operating Burger King restaurants in the region after its parent company Olayan completed its franchise agreement in 1991. Its first location opened in Riyadh in December 1992, and expanded across the Middle East opening stores in the neighboring countries of Kuwait, Qatar, Bahrain, and Lebanon in 2001. By 2007, the company had grown to over 180 locations in a half dozen countries, all located in Southwest Asia, when it signed an additional franchise agreement to open locations in North Africa, with the first location in Cairo, Egypt.

Hana currently owns and operates or sub-licenses over 200 restaurants on the Arabian Peninsula, Jordan, Lebanon and Egypt. To accommodate the tenets of the majority Islamic population's faith in its markets, all of the locations operated and overseen by Hana feature halal meats and do not feature pork based products. Additionally, hamburgers are marketed as beefburgers in some countries, avoiding the term ham and its association with pork.

==== North America ====
Heartland Food Corporation (Heartland) came into existence when Miami-based franchisee Al Cabrera purchased a large chunk of stores, 130 locations primarily in the Chicago and the upper mid-west, from the failed franchise AmeriKing for a bargain basement price of $16 million, or approximately 88% of their original value in December 2003. Taking these stores, he and his partners created a new company called Core Value Partners to renovate and update the locations which had deteriorated during Ameriking's decline. During this time, the company was renamed Heartland Food Corp. and it purchased 120 additional stores from other financially distressed owners and completely revamped them as well. The resulting purchases made Mr. Cabrerra Burger King's largest minority franchisee and Heartland one of BKC's top franchisee groups at the time. By 2006, the company was valued at over $150 million, and was sold to New York-based GSO Capital Partners.

2012 saw another major expansion for Heartland when it purchased 121 more stores from Burger King Corporation in March. 40 of the locations, in the Minneapolis, Minnesota, area, belonged to Duke & King - another bankrupt 93 store franchise group that was at one time Burger King's second largest North American franchisee. That sale, valued at $7.4 million (US$), added 40 locations to Heartland's portfolio. The deal, part of Burger Kings sell off of corporate owned stores, included a stipulation that the Heartland update 275 of its locations to current appearance standards. The remolding provision helped generate a 15% sales increase in those locations for Heartland. As of January 2013, Heartland is the second largest franchises of Burger King in North America. The Downers Grove, Illinois-based company owns and operates over 425 restaurants in The United States and Canada.

=== Russia ===
Master franchise: Burger Rus
Russian: Бypгep Kинг

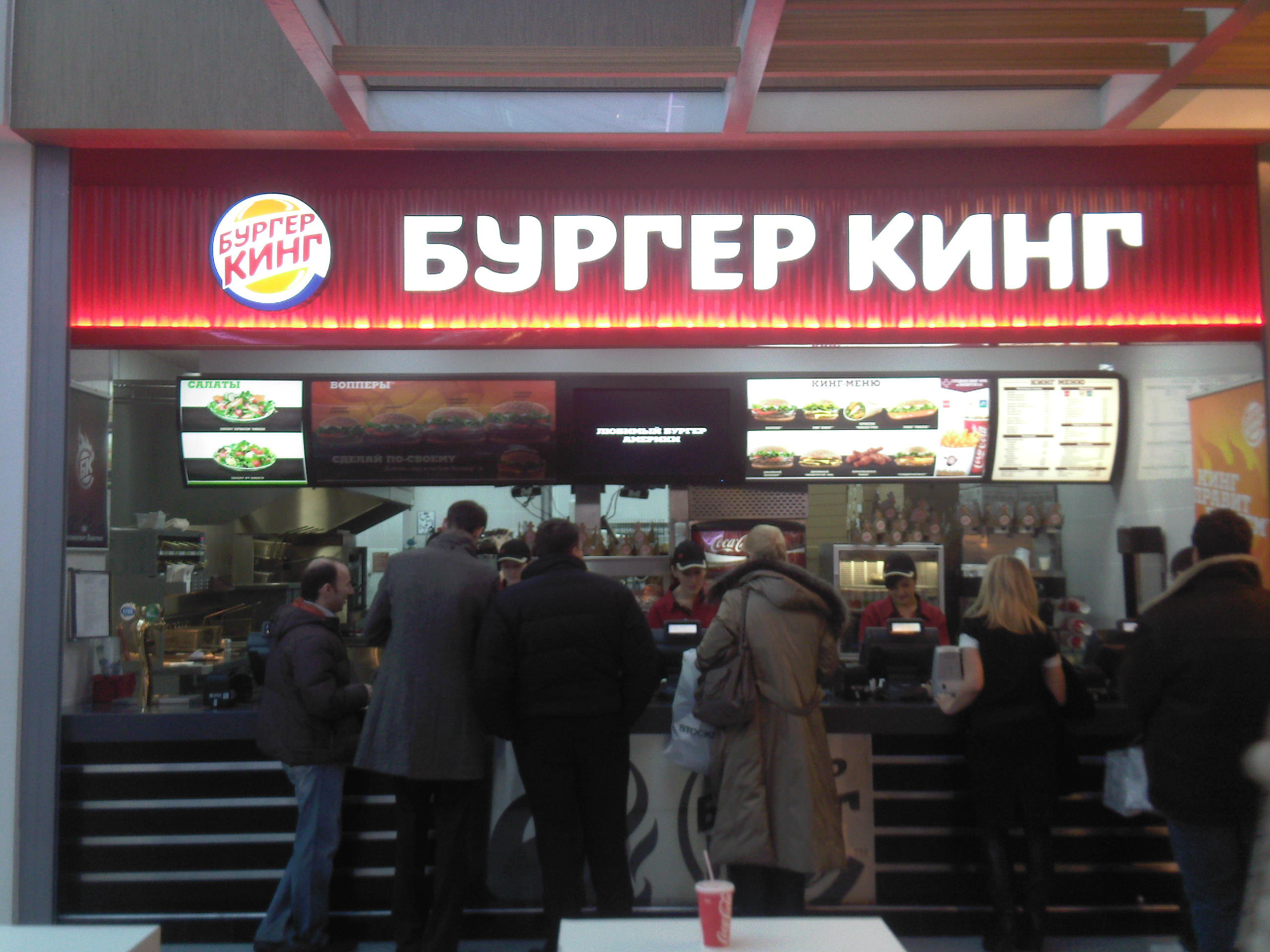
The first Burger King to open in Russia, located in the Moscow Metropolis Mall

Burger King originally planned to enter the Russian market as far back as 2006 by partnering with local coffee house chain Shokoladnitsa. However the company's plan was delayed several years; it finally opened its first Russian location in January 2010 at the Metropolis Shopping Mall in Northern Moscow, and by mid-2012 the company had almost 70 locations. 2012 saw Russia became the focus of a major international expansion for Burger King with a new plan to increase its presence in that country. The deal between Burger King, Russian master franchise Burger Rus and Russian investment bank VTB Capital is designed to grow the company from its January 2012 level of 57 to more than 300 within a few years. A good portion of the planned expansion will be focused in the Siberian region of the country, an area that is underserved by fast food chains. Further, the agreement solidified Burger Rus as the exclusive master franchise for the country. Burger Rus chair Dmitry Medovoy announced the first Siberian location will be in the city of Surgut by the end of 2012, with more locations in 2013. While the chain entered the Russian Market some twenty years after rival McDonald's, its expansion plans are intended to rapidly put it on a more even footing with McDonald's and possibly surpass it as at the time of the announcement, McDonald's had yet to open any locations east of the Ural Mountains.

=== United States ===
==== Army and Air Force Exchange Service ====
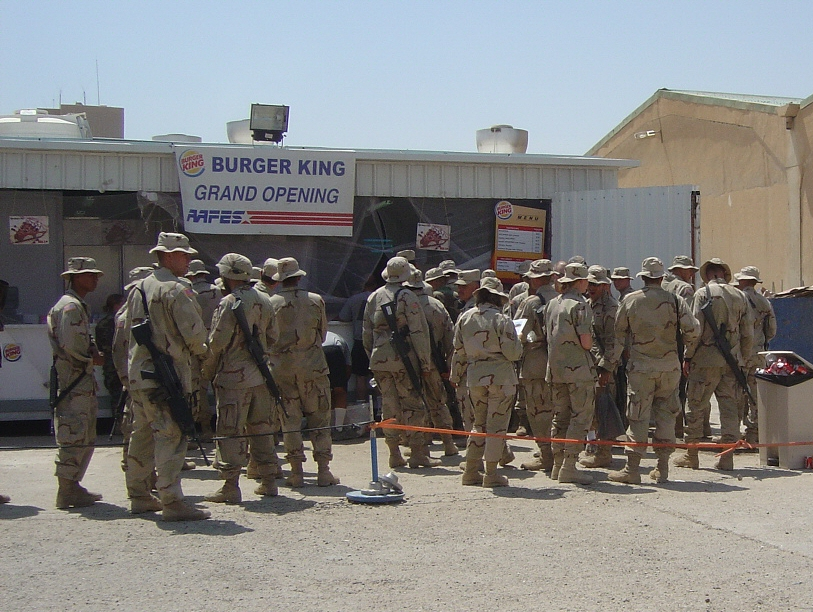
Army and Air Force Exchange Service location in the Baghdad's Green Zone

The Army and Air Force Exchange Service (AAFES) is a specialty retailer that operates military retail stores on US Army and Air Force bases and installations across the world. Burger King was the first restaurant chain to be opened on US military facilities with a location at the US Naval base at Pearl Harbor, however naval facilities are covered by the Navy Exchange Service Command (NEXCOM). The AAFES opened its first Burger King franchise 1984 at the American military facilities in Ansbach, Germany. The location was the first restaurant opened under a five-year agreement, with a fifteen-year extension, in which the AAFES agreed it would open 185 locations globally. Since that time the AAFES has opened nearly 200 locations in all theaters of operations of the two services. Almost all of the AAFES-operated Burger King restaurants are found on army posts and air force bases; however some locations, such as the one located at the Baghdad International Airport, are within territories under US military jurisdiction.

The AAFES group was given Burger King's first Award of Excellence in 2002 for the company what it called "its [AAFES] ceaseless efforts to support U.S. servicemen and women deployed to locations around the world in support of the war on terrorism." As the end of Burger King's 2010 fiscal year, AAFES is the fourth largest US franchisee of the chain with 132 restaurants globally.

==== Carrols Corporation ====
Carrols Corporation is the largest global franchisee of Burger King as of January 2013. Its parent company is Carrols Restaurant Group, at publicly traded corporation (Nasdaq: TAST). It has held this position since 2002 with the bankruptcy of Chicago-based AmeriKing Inc, which had 367 US locations at its peak.

Carrols Corporation was founded in 1960 as a franchisee of the Tastee Freeze Company's Carrols Restaurants division by Herb Slotnick under the name Carrols Drive-In Restaurants of New York, and by 1968 the company had grown to the point where it purchased the chain from Tastee Freeze. By 1974 Carrols owned and operated over 150 Carrols Club restaurants in the Northeast United States and abroad. In 1975 the company entered into a franchise agreement with Burger King and converted its existing Carrols restaurants in the US into BK locations, closed those stores that were not able to be updated and sold off its international operations.

In June 2012, Carrols acquired 278 BK locations from Burger King for approximately $150 million. In exchange, Burger King parent, Burger King Corporation took a 28.9 percent stake in the company. The transaction involved a line of credit that would be used by Carrols to renovate more than 450 of its stores and a 29.7% ownership stake in the franchise going to Burger King. Additional agreements will give Carrols the right of first refusal on approximately 500 stores. If it chooses to exercise these rights, Carrols could become the dominant franchisee of Burger King in the United States with possible control of hundreds of locations in twenty states. Three months after the acquisition, Carrols saw a 37.8% increase in total sales and 8.9% same store sales with a 4.9% increase in customer traffic. As of the end of Burger King's 2012 fiscal year, Carrols operates over 575 restaurants in New York, Ohio, and eighteen other states.

On February 20, 2019, it was reported that Carrols will purchase 55 Popeyes Louisiana Kitchens and 166 Burger Kings from Cambridge Franchise Holdings LLC. for $ 238 million. Those restaurants will be in the southern United States "structured as a tax-free merger". Carrols will give Cambridge around 7.36 million of common shares. Also included in the deal Cambridge will get 9% of Carrols preferred stock.

==== GPS Hospitality ====
GPS Hospitality, one of the "largest franchisee" of Burger King, is Headquartered in Atlanta Georgia with revenue around $650 million. GPS Hospitality is a franchisee with upwards to 400 Burger Kings and plans to add 15 more in the Southeastern United States.
