= V2food =

Australian food company

v2food
- logo for the v2food's burger
- Industry: Food
- Founded: January 2019; 7 years ago
- Founder: Nick Hazell
- Headquarters: Australia
- Key people: Tim York (CEO); Jack Cowin (investor)
- Products: Plant-based patties, mince, sausages
- Website: www.v2food.com

v2food is an Australia-based producer of plant-based meat substitutes. It is a partnership between Jack Cowin's Competitive Foods Australia and CSIRO's investment fund Main Sequence Ventures. The company produces plant-based meat alternative products using protein extracted from legumes.

== History ==
v2food was founded in January 2019 out of a partnership between Jack Cowin's Competitive Foods and CSIRO's investment fund Main Sequence Ventures. Jack Cowin's company also owns Hungry Jack's, the master franchisee of Burger King in Australia. CSIRO entered into an arrangement where the organization would generate research in exchange for an equity stake in the company.

Competitive Foods currently operates a facility in Brisbane. In 2019, the Australian Financial Review reported that a factory would be built in Wodonga before the end of the year. The factory opened in December 2020 and closed in 2023.

In 2020, the company raised funds to expand into China and other parts of Asia.

In 2023, founder and CEO Nick Hazell left the company and was replaced by Tim York.

In 2025, v2food, in partnership with Ajinomoto Co., Inc., acquired Daring Foods in the United States.

== Products ==
Hungry Jack's launched v2food's first product in October 2019, the "Rebel Whopper", a meat-free alternative to the fast food company's signature Whopper burger. v2food's burger patties later became available at Soul Burger and Burger Urge outlets, as well as New Zealand Burger King restaurants from January 2020. In late 2020, Burger King launched the "Plant-Based Whopper" featuring v2food's patties, in the Philippines and Japan.

In April 2020, v2food's mince product became available in meal kits from Marley Spoon. Their mince and burger patties became available in Woolworths and Coles supermarkets later that same year. The company released a sausage product in 2021.

== See also ==
- List of meat substitutes
