= Thomas Garrett (disambiguation) =

Thomas Garrett (1789–1871) was an American abolitionist and leader in the Underground Railroad movement before the American Civil War.

Thomas, Tom or Tommy Garrett may also refer to:

- Thomas Garrett (Australian politician) (1830–1891), New South Wales politician, newspaper proprietor and land agent
- Tom Garrett (cricketer) (1858–1943), Australian cricketer and public servant, son of the above
- Thomas Garrett (bishop) (died 1980), British-born Anglican bishop in the Church of South India
- Tommy Garrett (footballer) (1926–2006), English footballer
- Snuff Garrett (Thomas Lesslie Garrett, 1938–2015), American record producer
- Tommy Garrett (Nebraska politician) (born 1954), American politician from Nebraska
- T. Scott Garrett (Thomas Scott Garrett, born 1956), member of the Virginia House of Delegates
- Thomas A. Garrett (born 1962), American fast food restaurant executive
- Tom Garrett (Virginia politician) (born 1972), U.S. Representative from Virginia
