= GPS Hospitality =

Restaurant franchisee

- Company type: Private
- Industry: Restaurant
- Founded: October 19, 2012; 13 years ago
- Founder: Thomas A. Garrett
- Headquarters: Atlanta, Georgia
- Key people: Thomas A. Garrett (CEO); Scott Jasinski (CFO); Brian Arnold (CDO); Michael Lippert (President)
- Number of employees: 10,000+ (2019)
- Website: gpshospitality.com

GPS Hospitality is a privately held company that is primarily a franchisee for quick service restaurants (QSR), including Popeyes Louisiana Kitchen, Burger King and Pizza Hut. GPS Hospitality was founded by Thomas A. Garrett in 2012 and has over 10,000 employees.

== History ==
GPS's first day in business was October 19, 2012, when it bought 42 Burger King franchises.

On October 23, 2014, GPS acquired 39 Burger King restaurants in the Cincinnati area from Fire Grill, LLC.

On December 18, 2014, GPS acquired 36 Burger King restaurants in Maryland, Pennsylvania and New Jersey from Twoton Inc.

On July 21, 2015, GPS purchased 60 Burger Kings from one of "Michigan's largest multi-brand restaurant group[s]", TEAM Schostak Family Restaurants, partnering financially up with The Cynosure Group and Nonami Investments.

In 2016, GPS became a franchisee of Popeyes Louisiana Kitchens with 7 units in Atlanta and bought 194 more Burger Kings from Strategic Restaurants Acquisition Corporation (SRAC) Holdings. With the additional locations in Mississippi, Alabama, Florida and Arkansas, GPS increased their Burger King presence to 424 units.

On June 8, 2017, GPS added 11 Popeyes Louisiana Kitchen's in Georgia to bring their total up to 19 including, the ones GPS already have franchised in West Virginia.

On November 13, 2018, Burger King Corporation gave GPS three awards, the "Global Franchisee of the Year", "North America Franchisee of the year" and the "Gold Crown" awards.

In 2019, GPS bought 75 Pizza Hut franchises in Georgia, Alabama, Kentucky and Tennessee. bringing their portfolio up to almost 500 franchised restaurants. This acquisition kept GPS on their course of achieving their goal of $1 billion revenue by the year 2022.

== Charitable contributions ==
In 2017, GPS gave senior students graduating $ 1,000 in scholarships "through the Burger King McLamore Foundation" to help in their future education.
