= Hungry Jack's =

Australian fast food franchise

Hungry Jack's Pty Ltd.

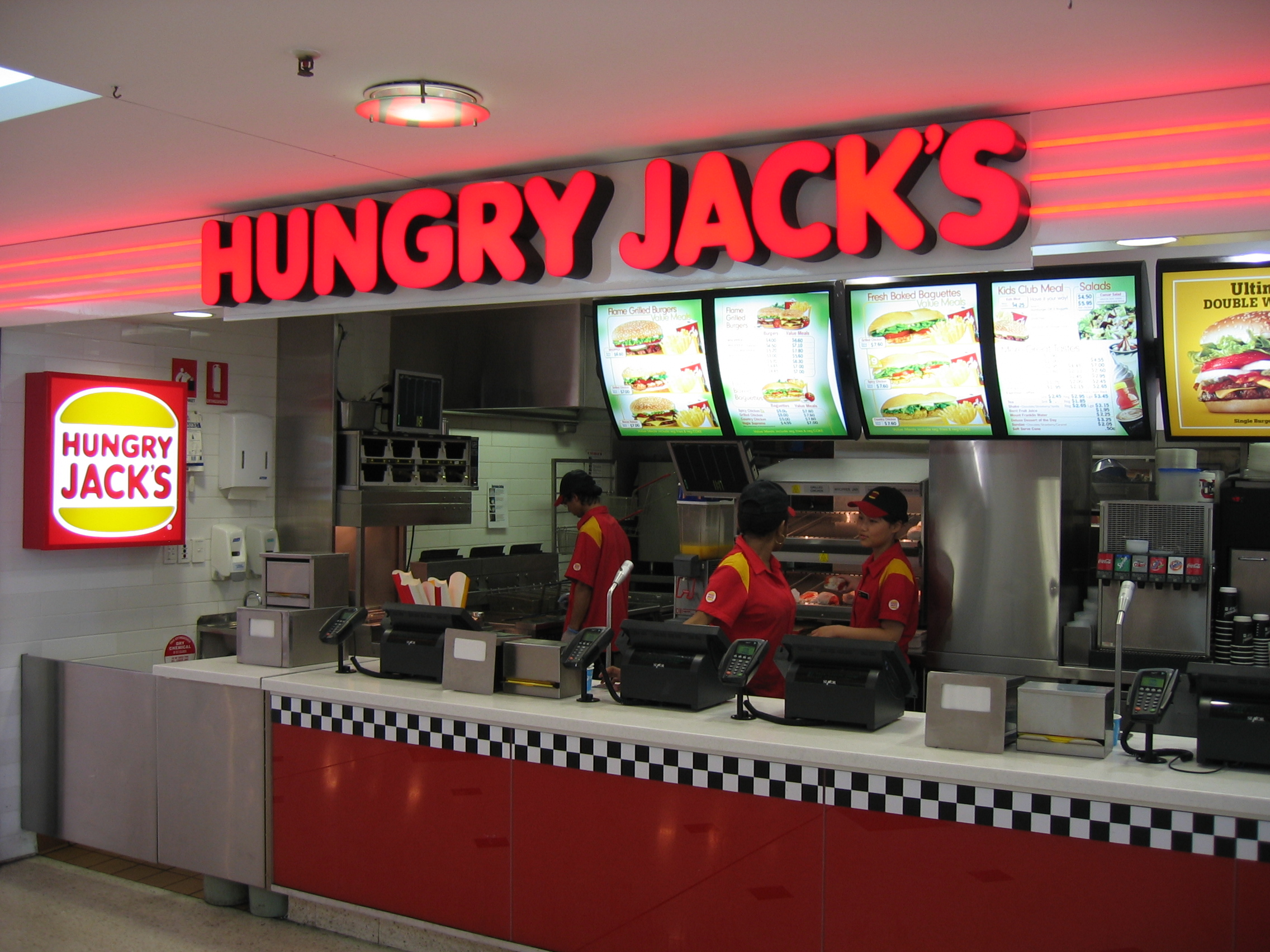
- A Hungry Jack's franchise in Brisbane, Queensland
- Type: Subsidiary
- Industry: Restaurants
- Genre: Fast food
- Founded: 19 June 1971; 55 years ago Perth, Western Australia, Australia
- Founder: Jack Cowin (Hungry Jack's); James McLamore and David Edgerton (Burger King)
- Headquarters: Sydney, New South Wales, Australia
- Key people: Chris Green (CEO)
- Products: Hamburgers, Chicken products, Salads, French fries, Onion rings, Breakfast and Hot and Cold Beverages, Kids' meals, Desserts
- Revenue: ▼ A$1.043 billion (2010)
- Operating income: ▲ A$538 million (2010)
- Net income: ▼ A$246.5 million (2010)
- Total equity: ▲ A$1.289 billion (2010)
- Number of employees: 16,500 (2019)
- Parent: Competitive Foods Australia
- Website: hungryjacks.com.au

Hungry Jack's Pty Ltd is an Australian fast food franchise of the Burger King Corporation. It is a wholly owned subsidiary of Competitive Foods Australia, with licensing from Restaurant Brands International, a privately held company owned by Jack Cowin. Hungry Jack's owns and operates or sub-licenses all of the Burger King/Hungry Jack's restaurants in Australia.

As the master franchise for Australia, the company is responsible for licensing new operators, opening its own stores and performing standards oversight of franchised locations in Australia. With over 400 locations across Australia, Hungry Jack's is the second-largest franchise of Burger King in the world, second to Carrols Corporation, which is now owned by Restaurant Brands International.

== Corporate profile ==
=== Early history ===
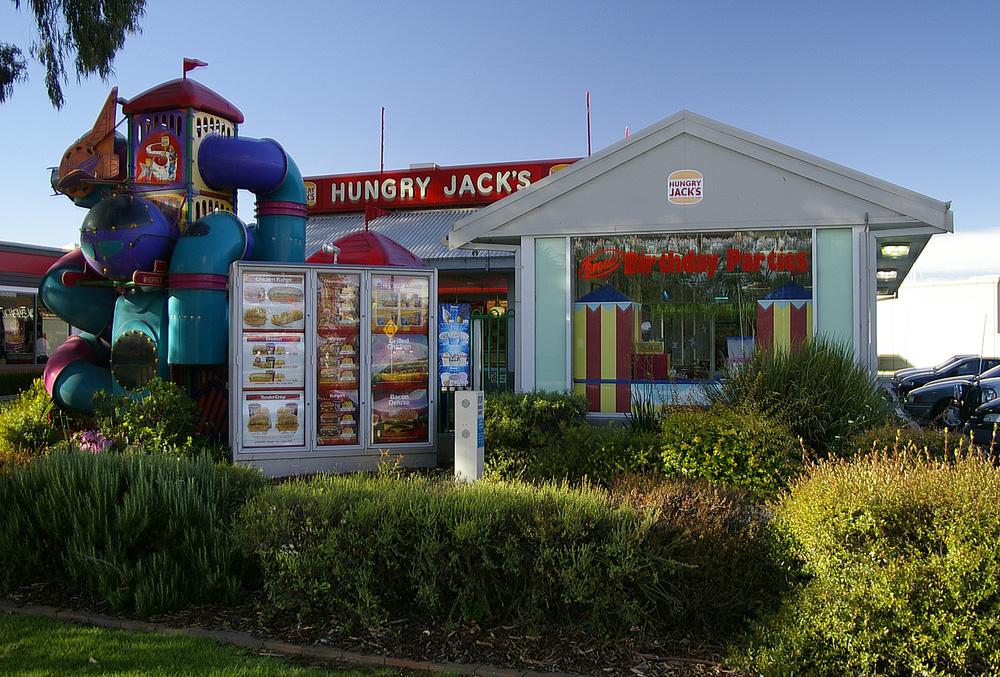
A Hungry Jack's restaurant in Wagga Wagga, New South Wales, with older signage and a older building

In 1970, Jack Cowin bought the rights to the Burger King franchise in Australia. However, he discovered that the name was already trademarked in Australia by Don Dervan, who had started a drive-in fast food takeaway restaurant business in the Adelaide suburb of Keswick, South Australia in 1962, soon opening further restaurants in Darlington, Glenelg, Elizabeth and in Adelaide; at the time were no legal obstacles to the name. Between 1962 and 1970, Don Dervan's Burger King was selling over a million burgers a year in South Australia. By 1972, it employed more than 200 people in 17 restaurants in Adelaide and across Australia.

As a result, Burger King provided Jack Cowin with a list of possible alternative names derived from pre-existing trademarks already registered by Burger King and its then corporate parent Pillsbury that could be used to name the Australian restaurants. Cowin selected the "Hungry Jack" brand name, one of Pillsbury's U.S. pancake mixture products, and slightly changed the name to a possessive form by adding an apostrophe and "s" to form the new name "Hungry Jack's". The first Australian franchise of Burger King Corporation was established in Innaloo, Perth, on 18 April 1971, under the auspices of Cowin's new company Hungry Jack's Pty Ltd.

By the end of its first decade of operation in the 1970s, Hungry Jack's had expanded to 26 stores in three states. In October 1981, the company opened its first New South Wales store in the Sydney central business district on the corner of Liverpool and George Street. In 1986, the chain entered Victoria by purchasing 11 stores from the ailing Wendy's Hamburgers chain, later converting them to Hungry Jack's.

=== 1996 to 2001: legal battle with Burger King ===
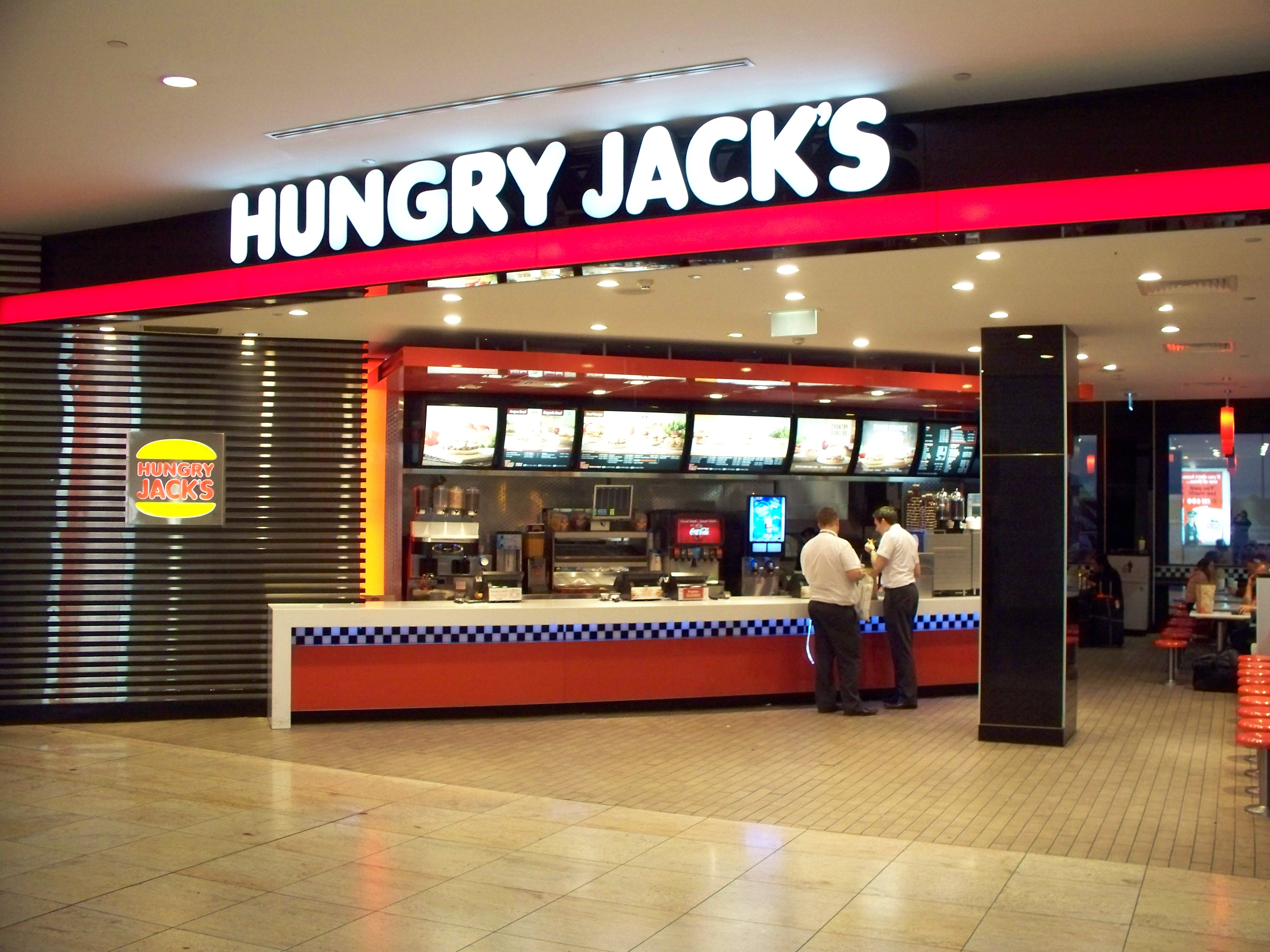
A Hungry Jack's outlet within Melbourne Airport T2

In 1991, Hungry Jack's Pty Ltd renewed its franchise agreement with Burger King Corporation which allowed the Hungry Jack's to license third party franchisee. However, one of the conditions of the agreement was that Hungry Jack's had to open a certain number of stores every year for the term of the contract. In 1996, shortly after the Australian trademark on the Burger King name lapsed, Burger King Corporation made a claim that Hungry Jack's had violated the conditions of the renewed franchise agreement by failing to expand the chain at the rate defined in the contract and sought to terminate the agreement.

On the basis of this claim, Burger King Corporation in partnership with Shell Australia, began to open its own stores in 1997 beginning in Sydney and throughout the Australian regions of New South Wales, Australian Capital Territory, Victoria and Tasmania. In addition, Burger King sought to limit HJ's ability to open new locations in the country, whether they were corporate locations or third-party licensees.

As a result of Burger King's actions, Hungry Jack's owner Jack Cowin and his company Competitive Foods Australia, began legal proceedings in 2001 against the Burger King Corporation, claiming Burger King Corporation had violated the conditions of the master franchising agreement and was in breach of the contract. The Supreme Court of New South Wales agreed with Cowin and determined that Burger King had violated the terms of the contract and awarded Hungry Jack's A$46.9 million (US$41.6 million in 2001).

In its decision, the Court said that Burger King sought to engineer a default of the franchise agreement so that the company could limit the number of new Hungry Jack's branded restaurants and ultimately claim the Australian market as its own, which was a purpose that was extraneous to the agreement. The case introduced the American legal concept of good faith negotiations into the Australian legal system, which until the time of the verdict had been rarely used in the Australian court systems.

=== 2002 to present ===
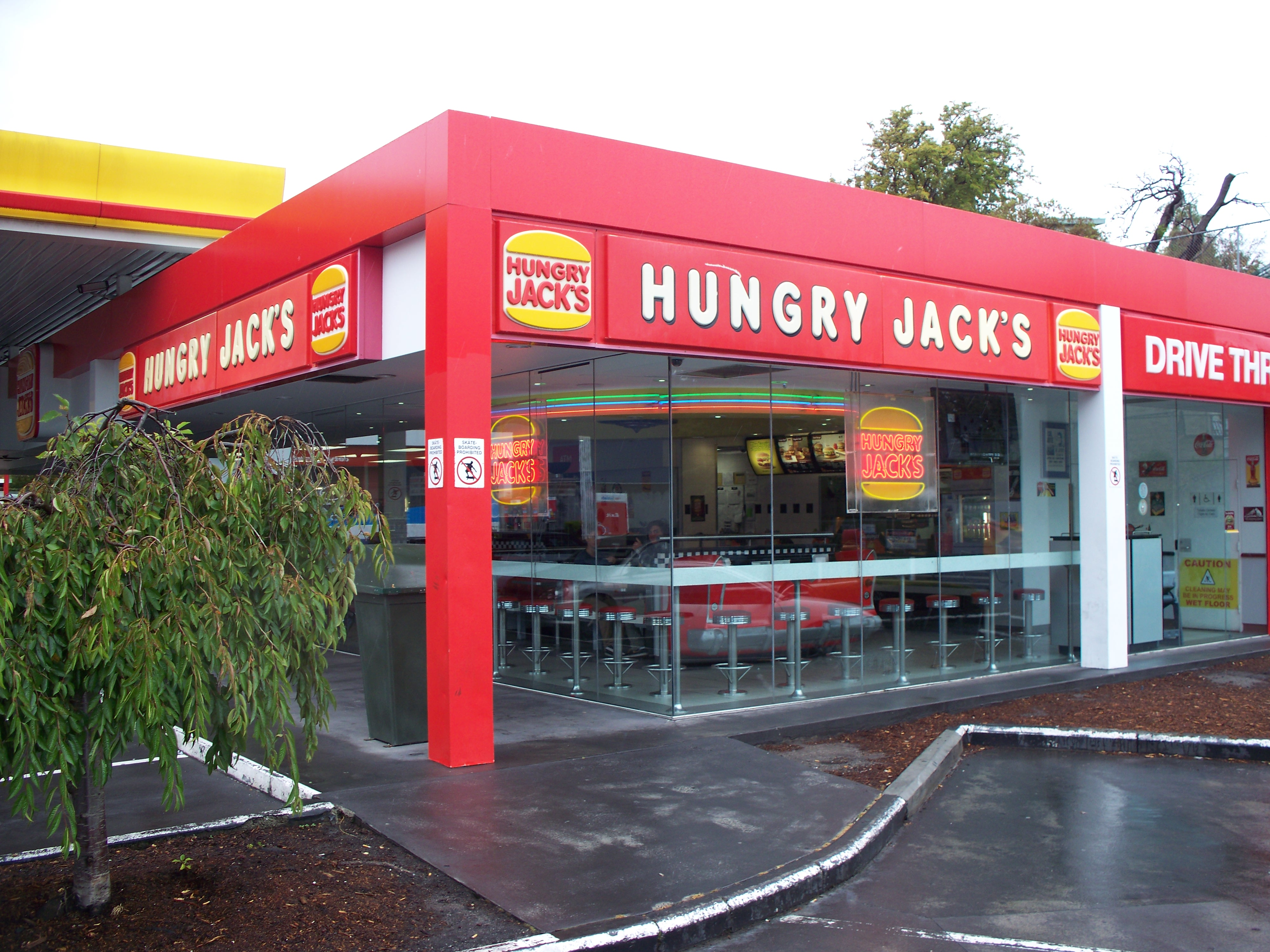
A Hungry Jack's/Coles Express/Shell outlet in Elizabeth Street, Hobart. From 1997 until it was rebranded in 2003 this was Hobart's first and only Burger King-branded outlet, and was the first Burger King in Australia to be located outside an airport.

After Burger King Corporation lost the case, it decided to terminate its operations in the country and in July 2002 the company transferred its assets to its New Zealand franchise group, Trans-Pacific Foods (TPF). The terms of the sale had TPF assume oversight of the Burger King franchises in the region as the Burger King brand's master franchisee. Trans-Pacific Foods administered the chain's 81 locations until September 2003 when the new management team of Burger King Corporation reached an agreement with Hungry Jack's Pty Ltd to rebrand the existing Burger King locations to Hungry Jack's and make Hungry Jack's Pty Ltd the sole master franchisee of both brands.

An additional part of the agreement required Burger King Corporation to provide administrative and advertising support as to ensure a common marketing scheme for the company and its products. Trans-Pacific Foods transferred its control of the Burger King franchises to Hungry Jack's Pty Ltd, which subsequently renamed the remaining Burger King locations as "Hungry Jack's," joining the other 210 outlets at the time.

In the 2009 to 2010 financial year, Competitive Foods Australia reported an after-tax profit of $32.1 million on sales of $1.043 billion.

As of September 2021, Hungry Jack's has 440 stores, with 75% being company owned. The company intends to open more than 20 new stores per year in the future, with an upper aim of 700 stores in total.

== Products ==
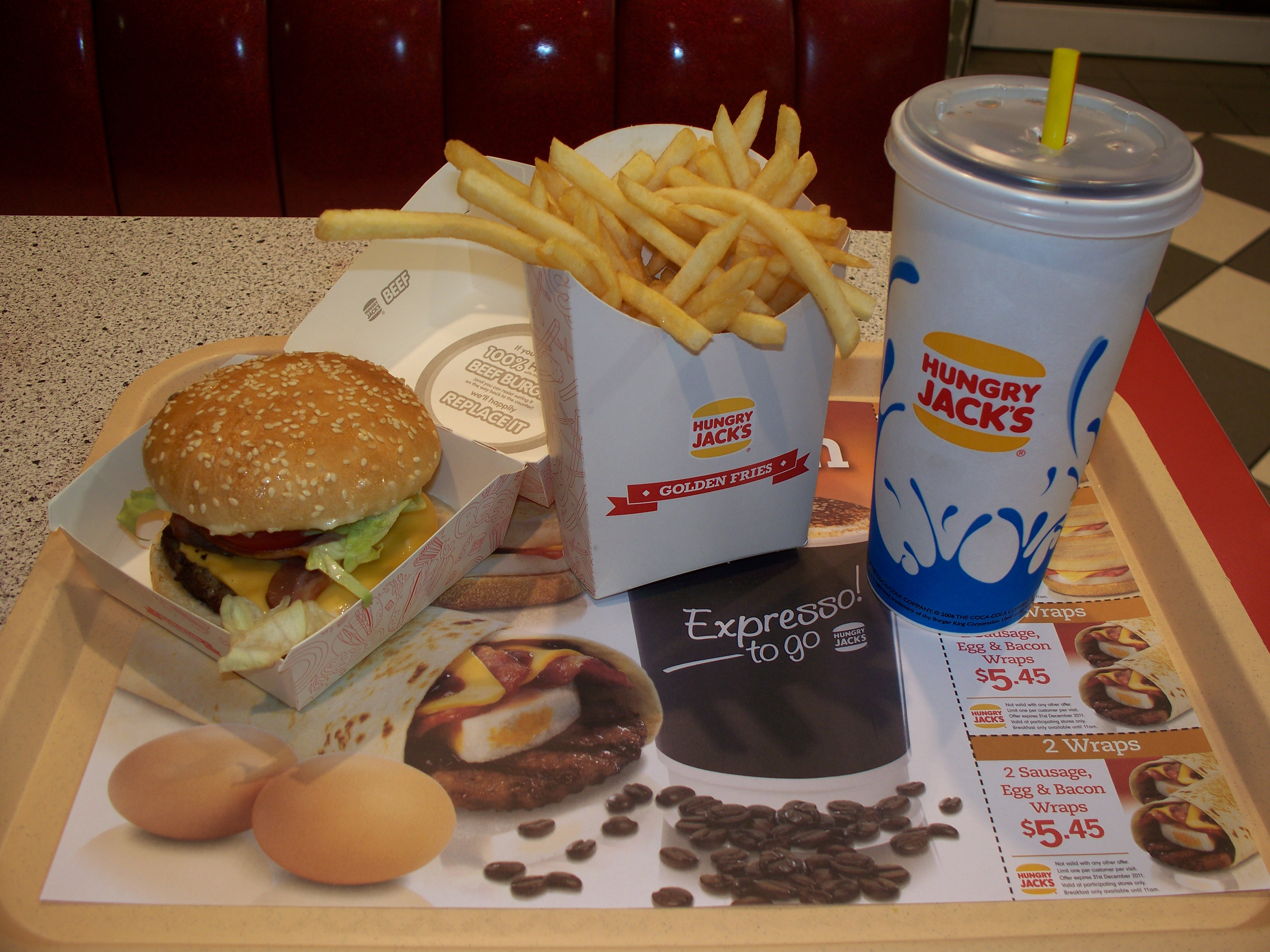
A Hungry Jack's Bacon Deluxe combo meal, a long-standing menu option unique to the Australian market

The only Burger King trademarks that are currently sold at Hungry Jack's are the Whopper range of beef burgers and the TenderCrisp range of chicken burgers. Other products sold by Hungry Jack's include the Brekky Wrap range and the Grill Masters premium Angus beef burger range, as well as more generic items such as cheeseburgers, chicken nuggets, and chips.

Hungry Jack's breakfast menu, introduced in late 2005 in two states, Queensland and Western Australia, as well as the Northern Territory, and the other states the following year, bears little resemblance to Burger King's US breakfast menu, and includes items such as English muffins and toasties. In 2021 Hungry Jack's released two new breakfast menu items, the Turkish Brekky BLAT and the Turkish Brekky BLAT with egg. A BLAT sandwich is popular in Australia; the acronym stands for Bacon, Lettuce, Avocado and Tomato.

Due to the increase in popularity of plant-based meat alternatives being consumed across Australia, Hungry Jack's introduced the "Rebel Whopper" in partnership with V2food in late 2019, which is a variation of the Whopper containing a meat-free patty made with protein extracted from legumes. A large promotional campaign was run, including partnering with online creator Natalie Tran. The restaurant also serves a vegan Whopper burger and English muffins, which contain a vegetable patty.

In November 2018, the full menu of Hungry Jack's was available for home delivery via Menulog.

In April 2022, Hungry Jack's launched its Jack's Café coffee chain brand as a pilot scheme in its 65 restaurant in Western Australia as a response to McDonald's McCafé offering. The pilot scheme was perceived as being successful and the coffee brand was rolled out to all Hungry Jack restaurants in Australia in June of the same year. Grinders Coffee, the coffee blend used by Hungry Jack's later received Gold Medal in the Large Chain Store Espresso Category of the 2023 Golden Bean Australasia awards.

=== Big Jack ===
In mid-2020, the chain introduced the "Big Jack" burger, which is essentially a slightly altered version of the Big King, and similar to McDonald's Big Mac burger. The close similarities in the name, appearance and the marketing of the burger to the Big Mac led to McDonald's suing Hungry Jack's in the Federal Court of Australia in August 2020 over trademark infringement, and they sought to cancel Hungry Jack's Big Jack trademark which had been filed the previous year. They also accused the company of deliberately copying the ingredients and appearance of the Big Mac in bad faith.

In its defence, Hungry Jack's argued that the burger's name was simply a play on the company's name and that of its founder Jack Cowin, and that a burger's appearance and composition cannot be protected by a trademark, noting that their product features "common characteristics of hamburgers" sold everywhere. In addition, Hungry Jack's ran an advertising campaign that, along with making light of the lawsuit, also made the claim that the Big Jack patty was 25% larger than the Big Mac's as a point of differentiation. However the company also admitted there was an “element of cheekiness” in the name, and that it was positioned as a direct competitor to the Big Mac.

In November 2023, the Federal Court ruled against McDonald's, finding that "Big Jack is not deceptively similar to Big Mac", and that the company had not established that Hungry Jack's trademarks had infringed on McDonald's existing trademarks. The Court also found Hungry Jack's claim that the Big Jack patty was larger than the Big Mac's to be misleading but it did not affect the final verdict.

Hungry Jack's eventually released a number of variants of the burger to the range, including a larger version — the Mega Jack, the Outlaw Big Jack (which added bacon and barbeque sauce), a version with Angus beef patties, and the Chicken Big Jack. After the legal case commenced, the burger and all its variants were removed from the menu in late 2021, though it has returned as a limited time item after the suit was resolved.

== Marketing ==
=== Logo ===
The Hungry Jack's logo is still based on the 1994 Burger King logo, despite subsequent revisions to the logo used by Burger King in other markets. The logo was redesigned in 2000, with the design based on the 1999 Burger King logo, but the logo was never used.

=== Sponsorship ===
Hungry Jack's currently sponsors the West Coast Eagles and Adelaide Football Club in the Australian Football League (AFL).

Hungry Jack's are the naming rights sponsor for the National Basketball League.

== See also ==
- List of hamburger restaurants
- List of restaurants in Australia

Jack Cowin:

- KFC, Jack Cowin previously owned franchises in Western Australia and the Northern Territory
- V2food
- Domino's Pizza Enterprises, master franchise of Domino's Pizza in Australia, New Zealand and several European countries. Jack Cowin's family trust is the majority shareholder of DPE
