= La Tagliatella =

Chain of Italian-cuisine restaurants in Spain

La Tagliatella is a chain of Italian-cuisine franchise restaurants based in Madrid, Spain, founded in 2003, run by AmRest Franchises. It is the ninth-largest chain in the Spanish market and has more than 230 restaurants in Spain and Portugal. In the 1st quarter of 2020 Amrest, which also includes the Bacoa, Blue Frog and Sushi Shop brands and licenses more than 2350 restaurants in 25 countries, had sales of 380 million euro.
