= Competitive Foods Australia =

Australian franchiser of restaurants

- Type: Private
- Headquarters: Sydney, Australia
- Key people: Jack Cowin (CEO)
- Owner: Jack Cowin
- Subsidiaries: Hungry Jack's

Competitive Foods Australia (CFA) is the largest franchiser of restaurants in Australia. It is owned and operated by Jack Cowin. Its units are Hungry Jack's and, previously, some KFC stores.

== Holdings ==
=== Hungry Jack's ===
Hungry Jack's is the exclusive Australian master franchisee of Burger King Corporation. Competitive Foods Australia owns over 400 Hungry Jack's stores.

When Burger King decided to expand its operations into Australia, it found that its business name was already trademarked by a man running a small takeaway food shop in Adelaide. Thus, Burger King was forced to change the name when it decided to open stores in the country – the only time this has happened in its corporate history. Burger King provided the Australian franchisee, Jack Cowin, with a list of possible alternative names that the Australian Burger King restaurants could be branded as. The names were derived from pre-existing trademarks already registered by Burger King and its then corporate parent Pillsbury. Cowin selected the "Hungry Jack" brand name, one of Pillsbury's US pancake mixture products, and slightly changing the name to a possessive form by adding an apostrophe 's' thus forming the new name Hungry Jack's. Accordingly, the first Australian franchise of the Burger King Corporation, established in Perth in 1971, was branded as Hungry Jack's.

Hungry Jack's currently owns and operates or sub-licenses all of the Hungry Jack's and Burger King restaurants in Australia. As the master franchise for the continent, the company is responsible for licensing new operators, opening its own stores and performing standards oversight of franchised locations in Australia.

=== KFC ===
In 2013, Competitive Foods sold all 44 of its KFC stores to Collins Foods for $55.6 million.

== Legal issues ==
=== Burger King Corporation v Hungry Jack's ===
In 1991, Hungry Jack's Pty Limited renewed its franchise agreement with Burger King Corporation which allowed Hungry Jack's to license third party franchisee. However, one of the conditions of the agreement was that Hungry Jack's had to open a certain number of stores each year for the term of the contract. In 1996, shortly after the Australian trademark on the Burger King name lapsed, Burger King Corporation made a claim that Hungry Jack's had violated the conditions of the renewed franchise agreement by failing to the expand the chain at the rate defined in the contract and sought to terminate the agreement. Under the aegis of this claim, Burger King Corporation in partnership with Royal Dutch Shell's Australian division Shell Company of Australia Ltd, began to open its own stores in 1997 beginning in Sydney and throughout the Australian regions of New South Wales, Australian Capital Territory and Victoria. Additionally, Burger King Corporation sought to limit Hungry Jack's ability to open new locations in the country, whether they were corporate locations or third-party licensees.

As a result of Burger King's actions, Hungry Jack's owner Jack Cowin and his company Competitive Foods Australia, began legal proceedings in 2001 against the Burger King Corporation claiming Burger King Corporation had violated the conditions of the master franchising agreement and was in breach of the contract. The Supreme Court of New South Wales agreed with Cowin and determined that Burger King Corporation had violated the terms of the contract and awarded Hungry Jack's A$46.9 million. In its decision, the Court said that Burger King sought to engineer a default of the franchise agreement so that the company could limit the number of new Hungry Jack's branded restaurants and ultimately claim the Australian market as its own, which was a purpose that was extraneous to the agreement.

After Burger King Corporation lost the case, it decided to terminate its business in the country and sold its operations and assets to its New Zealand franchise group, Trans-Pacific Foods (TPF). The terms of the sale had TPF assume oversight of the Burger King franchises in the region as the Burger King brand's master franchisee. TPF administered the chain's 81 locations until September 2003 when the new management team of Burger King Corporation reached an agreement with Hungry Jack's Pty to re-brand the existing Burger King locations to Hungry Jack's and make Hungry Jack's the sole master franchisee of both brands. An additional part of the agreement required Burger King Corporation to provide administrative and advertising support as to ensure a common marketing scheme for the company and its products. TPF transferred its control of the Burger King franchises to Hungry Jack's, which subsequently renamed the majority of the remaining Burger King locations as Hungry Jack's. While Hungry Jack's is now the exclusive master franchisee for Burger King in Australia and has the right to allow new Burger King locations in the country, no new locations have opened and only a small handful of Burger King restaurants remain in New South Wales.

=== Yum! Brands and CFA ===
In October, 2007 a similar issue arose between KFC parent Yum! Brands and CFA over Yum's refusal to renew the franchise agreement in Western Australia. Yum was reported to have made an offer to CFA for the properties that was below market value, which CFA refused. The issue has drawn a large amount of scrutiny in the local press and inspired local Labor MP Paul Papalia to call upon the Western Australian and Australian Federal governments to launch inquiries on the issue.
