= Thomas A. Garrett =

American businessman

Thomas A. Garrett (born in Gadsden, Alabama, in 1962), is a former president and CEO of Arby's, an American fast food restaurant chain. He is currently CEO and founder of GPS Hospitality.

He was executive vice president and chief operating officer of Triarc from September 2007 through September 2008. Previously, he served as president and chief operating officer of Arby's Restaurant Group, Inc. Garrett served as chief operating officer of ARG following Triarc's acquisition of the RTM Restaurant Group in July 2005 to June 2006. From June 2003 to July 2005, Garrett served as president of RTM, and from May 2000 to June 2003, he served as chief operating officer of RTM."

== Career ==
=== Arby's ===
Garrett, who worked for the company for nearly 30 years, became President in September 2008 but left the company in January 2010 after Arby's suffered disappointing sales.

Before Triarc bought RTM Group, (for which Garrett was president), Garrett was an assistant manager for Arby's in Gadsden, Alabama, in 1980, Garrett rose through the ranks to become chief operating officer when he was 44 years old.

=== Burger King ===
Garrett acquired 42 Burger King franchises under his new company, GPS Hospitality, which was formed in June 2012 and the company’s first day of business was Oct. 19. GPS will focus on "reaching 100 restaurants in the next five years."
