= Jack Cowin =

Canadian-Australian businessman (born 1942)

- Born: 13 July 1942 (age 84); Windsor, Ontario, Canada
- Education: University of Western Ontario
- Occupations: Entrepreneur; Executive Chairman
- Known for: Founder of Hungry Jack's
- Office: Chancellor of the University of Western Ontario
- Term: 22 October 2015–23 May 2019
- Successor: Linda Hasenfratz
- Board member of: Competitive Foods Australia; Consolidated Foods; Domino’s Pizza Enterprises; BridgeClimb Sydney
- Spouse: Sharon Cowin
- Children: 4

Jack Cowin (/ˈkaʊɪn/, born 13 July 1942) is a Canadian-Australian businessman and entrepreneur with a long-term involvement in franchised fast food chains in Australia and Canada. Cowin brought KFC to Australia, founded and owns Hungry Jack's, which is the Burger King franchise in Australia, and has at various stages controlled the Domino's Pizza franchise in Australia prior to its 2005 listing on the ASX.

Cowin also has an ownership stake in the Lone Star Texas Grill restaurant chain in Canada, with upstream Australian investments in cattle stations and food processing. Cowin is the Executive Chairman of Competitive Foods Australia, one of Australia's largest privately held businesses. Cowin has also been an investor in Australia's Ten Network, serving as a non-executive director.

Cowin served as the Chancellor of the University of Western Ontario from 2015 until 2019.

== Early life ==
Cowin was born on 13 July 1942 in Windsor, Ontario, Canada. His father, Stanley J. Cowin, was posted to Australia briefly by Ford and later encouraged his son to consider emigrating there.

As a child he was a mower and paperboy. As college student, he sold trees, shrubs and rocks. Cowin graduated with a Bachelor of Arts from the University of Western Ontario in 1964.

== Career ==
Cowin became an insurance salesman with London Life for four years in Toronto before deciding to visit Australia to assess some business opportunities. Seeing long queues at a Chinese takeaway restaurant while vacationing in Sydney, he became convinced that fast food would sell well. Aged 26 years, Cowin returned to Australia to evaluate expanding Kentucky Fried Chicken (KFC) into the market that at that stage had limited fast food options.

He bought the right to open ten KFC franchises in Western Australia, raised CA$10,000 each from thirty Canadians to launch the business in December 1969, having moved with his wife and young child. As of March 2006, those initial investors had an investment worth approximately A$8.9 million. After opening eight KFC outlets, he bought the rights to Burger King.

Cowin later discovered someone else had the rights to the Burger King trademark in Australia, so Cowin instead called the outlets Hungry Jack's. Many years later he had a falling out with Burger King over the name and other issues related to their franchise agreement which was eventually resolved in his favour. He talks about this in an interview for The Billion Dollar Secret book to which Cowin contributed.

In 1999 Cowin took action against Burger King Corp. in the Supreme Court of New South Wales. Cowin alleged that Burger King attempted to terminate Hungry Jack's contract on the grounds that the Australian franchisee was not opening new units as fast as was required under the agreement. In response, Cowin's Hungry Jack's sued Burger King for breach of contract, alleging that the chain had no legal grounds for terminating the contract.

The NSW Supreme Court ordered Burger King Corp. to pay A$45 million to Hungry Jack's Ltd. for lost profits from delayed restaurant openings, inability to sell third-party franchises, and cannibalization by the chain's corporate-owned locations. Burger King appealed the matter to the New South Wales Court of Appeal, and on 21 June 2001, the appeal was dismissed and Burger King Corp. was ordered to pay Hungry Jack's A$71 million in damages.

The business Competitive Foods Australia continues to be privately held by his family, with an estimated value of $350 million. In 2017, Cowin advocated for the elimination of weekend worker penalty rates within Australia, regarding them as a "thing of the past".

Cowin also owns Consolidated Foods, a meat processing business that exports throughout the world. Cowin sold a substantial investment in Stanbroke Pastoral Company, one of the country's biggest cattle station operators. Cowin is also an investor in the Lone Star Texas Grill restaurant chain in Canada. Cowin is a major shareholder in RCX (Rail Crew Express), a US transportation company based in Kansas that operates 1,000 vehicles as a crew hauling service to the major railway operators.

Cowin has served as a non-executive director of the TEN Television Network, Chandler MacLeod, Sydney Olympic Park Authority, and Fairfax Media. He is the Chairman and largest shareholder of Domino’s Pizza Enterprises. He also is a Director and 40% shareholder of BridgeClimb Sydney – operator of a major Sydney tourist attraction.

== Personal life ==
Cowin lives in Sydney with his wife, Sharon, with whom he has had four children.

In 2000, his alma mater, the University of Western Ontario, conferred Cowin with the award of Doctor of Law (honoris causa). Cowin served as the 22nd Chancellor of the University from September 2015 until May 2019. He gifted funds to the University to pay for stands for the new football field, that was named in honour of his father, Stanley J. Cowin.

Cowin is an active member of the World Presidents Organization.

=== Net worth ===
As of May 2025, the net worth of Cowin was assessed by the Financial Review Rich List at A$4.67 billion; and was ranked as the 26th richest Australian. Meanwhile, Forbes Asia assessed Cowin's net worth as US$1.7 billion in 2019; and he was ranked as the 23rd richest Australian by net worth.

Year	Financial Review Rich List		Forbes Australia's 50 Richest	
Year	Rank	Net worth (A$)	Rank	Net worth (US$)
2008	70			
2009	79 ▼	0.486 billion		
2010		0.538 billion		
2011				
2012				
2013				
2014				
2015			29 ▲	$1.00 billion ▲
2016	24	$1.80 billion	18 ▲	$1.50 billion ▲
2017	20 ▼	$2.38 billion ▲	22 ▼	
2018	24 ▼	$2.41 billion ▲		
2019	25 ▼	$2.79 billion ▲	23 ▼	$1.70 billion ▲
2020	17 ▲	$4.51 billion ▲		
2021	17	$4.94 billion ▲		
2022	19 ▼	$5.20 billion ▼		
2023	22 ▼	$4.36 billion ▼		
2024	23 ▼	$4.88 billion ▲		
2025	33 ▼	$4.67 billion ▼		

Legend
Icon	Description
Steady	Has not changed from the previous year
▲	Has increased from the previous year
▼	Has decreased from the previous year

== See also ==
- Pizza Hut

Academic offices
Preceded by Joseph Rotman	Chancellor of the University of Western Ontario; 2015–2019	Succeeded by Linda Hasenfratz
