= Australian trade mark law =

Australian trade mark law is based on common-law use-based rights as well as the Trade Marks Act 1995 (Cth), which is administered by IP Australia, an Australian government agency within the Department of Industry, Science and Resources.

Use-based rights are less certain than registration, and depend on the mark having developed a reputation in the region in which a business owner seeks to enforce its common-law trade mark. Registration provides advantages such as constructive notice and nationwide rights.

Among other things, the Trade Marks Act 1995 defines trade marks (including certification marks and collective marks), what constitutes trademark infringement and defences and exceptions thereto, and (together with the Trade Marks Regulations 1995 (Cth)) sets out procedures for registration and other proceedings before the Registrar of Trade Marks. The legislation does not codify the law of trade marks in Australia; as a common law jurisdiction, a trade mark owner may also (for example) seek to protect its rights through legal proceedings for passing off or, more commonly, misleading and deceptive conduct contrary to the Competition and Consumer Act 2010.

Section 17 of the Trade Marks Act 1995 defines a trade mark as "a sign used, or intended to be used, to distinguish goods or services dealt with or provided in the course of trade by a person from goods or services so dealt with or provided by any other person".

== Registration ==
The procedure to register a trade mark in Australia is much the same as in other British Commonwealth countries. A completed application is filed by an applicant with IP Australia. The application is then checked ("examined") by an examiner of trade marks for compliance with formalities and substantive requirements (e.g. registrability, and lack of confusing similarity with a conflicting trade mark). Examination in Australia has (from 2019 to 2021) been backlogged. The Australian Trade Marks Office Manual of Practice and Procedure is an official publication produced by IP Australia, which provides detailed information to examiners and applicants on the practices and procedures relating to the filing, examination, and registration of a trade mark in accordance with the provisions of the Trade Marks Act 1995 (Cth).

If an application is accepted for registration by an examiner, it will be published for opposition purposes for two months, during which time third parties may oppose registration on certain grounds. If there are no oppositions, or any oppositions are overcome, a certificate of registration will issue.

The term of registration in Australia is 10 years, which may be extended for additional periods of 10 years. Failure to use a registered trade mark for a period of three years or more may expose the registration to removal from the register on the grounds of non-use.

== Infringement ==
Infringement is defined by section 120 of the Trade Marks Act, and includes a cause of action for infringement of well-known marks.

== Assistance from Customs ==
The Australian Border Force has in place a procedure permitting a registered trade mark owner to seize goods which infringe registered trade mark rights.

== See also ==
- Trademark symbol
