= Leduc (provincial electoral district) =

Defunct provincial electoral district in Alberta, Canada

Alberta electoral district

Defunct provincial electoral district
- Legislature: Legislative Assembly of Alberta
- District created: 1905
- District abolished: 1971
- District re-created: 1993
- District re-abolished: 2001
- First contested: 1905
- Last contested: 2001

Leduc was a provincial electoral district in Alberta, Canada, mandated to return a single member to the Legislative Assembly of Alberta from 1905 to 1971 and again from 1993 to 2004.

== History ==
Leduc was one of the original 25 electoral districts contested in the 1905 Alberta general election upon Alberta becoming a province and joining Confederation in September 1905. The electoral district was named for the city of Leduc in central Alberta.

From 1924 to 1956, the district used instant-runoff voting to elect its MLA.

Leduc was dissolved in the 1971 electoral district re-distribution to form the Wetaskiwin-Leduc and Drayton Valley electoral districts. Leduc would be recreated in the 1993 electoral district re-distribution from Wetaskiwin-Leduc and Camrose electoral districts.

Leduc would once again be dissolved in the 2003 electoral boundary re-distribution and become Leduc-Beaumont-Devon.

=== Members of the Legislative Assembly (MLAs) ===
Members of the Legislative Assembly for Leduc
Assembly	Years	Member	Party
1st	1905–1909	Robert Telford	Liberal
2nd	1909–1913	Robert Telford	Liberal
3rd	1913–1917	Stanley G. Tobin	Liberal
4th	1917–1921	Stanley G. Tobin	Liberal
5th	1921–1926	Stanley G. Tobin	Liberal
6th	1926–1930	Douglas C. Breton	United Farmers
7th	1930–1935	Arthur Percy Mitchell	Liberal
8th	1935–1940	Ronald E. Ansley	Social Credit
9th	1940–1944	Ronald E. Ansley	Social Credit
10th	1944–1948	Ronald E. Ansley	Social Credit
11th	1948–1952	Ronald E. Ansley	Social Credit
12th	1952–1955	Ronald E. Ansley	Independent Social Credit
13th	1955–1959	Ronald E. Ansley	Independent Social Credit
14th	1959–1963	Ronald E. Ansley	Independent Social Credit
15th	1963–1967	James Douglas Henderson	Social Credit
16th	1967–1971	James Douglas Henderson	Social Credit
See Wetaskiwin-Leduc electoral district from 1971-1993, Camrose electoral district from 1971-1993 and Drayton Valley electoral district from 1971-1993
23rd	1993–1997	Terry Kirkland	Liberal
24th	1997–2001	Albert Klapstein	Progressive Conservative
25th	2001–2004	Albert Klapstein	Progressive Conservative
See Leduc-Beaumont-Devon electoral district from 2004-2012

Robert Telford of the Liberal party, easily won the seat in 1905. His popularity was such that no one even bothered to run against him in 1909.

Stanley Tobin, running as a Liberal candidate, easily won the seat in 1913, 1917 and in 1921 when his only competitor was UFA candidate Don Muir. In 1921 the two candidates' vote tallies were only ten apart and the count was appealed. However a judge refused to accept as legal tender the certified cheque submitted with the appeal so the appeal was not proceeded with. However, according to UFA historian Ernie Cook, it was commonly known that Muir had received more votes than Tobin.

Tobin did not run for re-election in 1926, and the seat was taken by Douglas Breton of the UFA. A well-travelled man, having been born in South Africa and serving in WWI in India and Afghanistan, he was locally respected and the village of Keystone was renamed in his honour.

In 1930 Liberal Arthur Percy Mitchell won the seat in a tight two-way race against the incumbent MLA, Douglas Breton of the UFA.

Ronald E. Ansley of the Social Credit party defeated Mitchel and three others for the seat in 1935. He held the seat for the Social Credit party until 1952, then as an Independent SC candidate until 1963.

By 1948, Ansley had become unhappy with the Social Credit government over lack of implementation of Douglas monetary reforms. But he ran for re-election in the 1948 Alberta general election under the party's label. He was returned to office for his fourth term, easily defeating the two other candidates.

Shortly after the election the Social Credit party voted to exclude Albert Bourcier from the Social Credit caucus and expelled other Douglasite Social Creditors from the party through a motion passed at the 1948 Social Credit Annual General Meeting. Ansley who was a member of the Douglasite group was not expelled but he openly opposed the expulsions.

The Social Credit League formally asked the government in 1949 to expel Ansley and other members of caucus who held membership in the Douglas Social Credit Council.

In 1951 he openly led a revolt that defeated the proposed Mineral Taxation Act 29 to 15 in a recorded division on third reading. He was expelled from caucus on June 16, 1952, after attending a nomination convention asking Bourcier to run as an Independent Social Credit candidate.

The Leduc Social Credit Constituency Association nominated Ansley as their candidate with a clause in the motion to endorse stating that he would be supported regardless of what banner he ran under. The SC party leadership disallowed his nomination as a candidate for their party.

Being unable to run as a straight Social Credit candidate, Ansley stood for re-election as an Independent Social Credit candidate. He won a hotly contested race, defeating two other candidates to return to his fifth term in office. At first during the vote count he did not have a majority of votes but vote transfers conducted under the instant-runoff voting rules gave him a majority of votes and the seat.

Ansley ran for a sixth term in office in the 1955 Alberta general election. The five-way race was closely contested. Ansley ended up holding on to his seat by winning after the three least-popular candidates were eliminated and their votes transferred.

Ansley ran for a seventh term in the 1959 Alberta general election. He held his seat, easily defeating the two other candidates - a Conservative and a CCF-er. No official Social Credit candidate ran against him. He won with less than a majority of the votes, but his plurality was enough to win as the first past the post election system had come into use.

Ansley ran for an eighth term in office in the 1963 Alberta general election. He was defeated by Social Credit candidate James Douglas Henderson. Ansley finished a distant third place in a field of six candidates.

== Election results ==
=== 1905 ===
1905 Alberta general election
Party	Candidate	Votes	%	±%
Liberal	Robert Telford	481	63.46%	–
Conservative	C. E. A. Simonds	277	36.54%	–
Total		758	–	–
Rejected, spoiled and declined		N/A	–	–
Eligible electors / turnout		758	N/A	–
Liberal pickup new district.				
Source(s) Source: "Leduc Official Results 1905 Alberta general election". Alberta Heritage Community Foundation.

=== 1909 ===
1909 Alberta general election
Party	Candidate	Votes	%	±%
Liberal	Robert Telford	Acclaimed	–	–
Total		N/A	–	–
Rejected, spoiled and declined		N/A	–	–
Eligible electors / turnout		N/A	N/A	–
Liberal hold		Swing		N/A
Source(s) Source: "Leduc Official Results 1909 Alberta general election". Alberta Heritage Community Foundation.

=== 1913 ===
1913 Alberta general election
Party	Candidate	Votes	%	±%
Liberal	Stanley G. Tobin	582	57.17%	–
Conservative	George Curry	436	42.83%	–
Total		1,018	–	–
Rejected, spoiled and declined		N/A	–	–
Eligible electors / turnout		1,504	67.69%	–
Liberal hold		Swing		N/A
Source(s) Source: "Leduc Official Results 1913 Alberta general election". Alberta Heritage Community Foundation.

=== 1917 ===
1917 Alberta general election
Party	Candidate	Votes	%	±%
Liberal	Stanley G. Tobin	1,707	73.67%	16.50%
Conservative	George Currie	610	26.33%	-16.50%
Total		2,317	–	–
Rejected, spoiled and declined		N/A	–	–
Eligible electors / turnout		2,891	80.15%	12.46%
Liberal hold		Swing		16.50%
Source(s) Source: "Leduc Official Results 1917 Alberta general election". Alberta Heritage Community Foundation.

=== 1921 ===
1921 Alberta general election
Party	Candidate	Votes	%	±%
Liberal	Stanley G. Tobin	1,351	50.19%	-23.49%
United Farmers	D. S. Muir	1,341	49.81%	–
Total		2,692	–	–
Rejected, spoiled and declined		N/A	–	–
Eligible electors / turnout		N/A	N/A	–
Liberal hold		Swing		-23.49%
Source(s) Source: "Leduc Official Results 1921 Alberta general election". Alberta Heritage Community Foundation.

=== 1926 ===
1926 Alberta general election
Party	Candidate	Votes	%	±%
First count
United Farmers	Douglas C . Breton	1,961	45.13%	-4.78%
Liberal	C. W. Carroll	1,561	35.93%	-14.26%
Conservative	C. B. Kidd	823	18.94%	–
Total		4,345	–	–
Ballot transfer results
United Farmers	Douglas C . Breton	2,334	58.31%	–
Liberal	C.W. Carroll	1,669	41.69%	–
Total		4,003	–	–
Rejected, spoiled and declined		229	–	–
Eligible electors / turnout		6,337	72.18%	–
United Farmers gain from Liberal		Swing		N/A
Source(s) Source: "Leduc Official Results 1926 Alberta general election". Alberta Heritage Community Foundation. Instant-runoff voting requires a candidate to receive a plurality (greater than 50%) of the votes. As no candidate received a plurality of votes, the bottom candidate was eliminated and their 2nd place votes were applied to both other candidates until one received a plurality

=== 1930 ===
1930 Alberta general election
Party	Candidate	Votes	%	±%
Liberal	Arthur Percy Mitchell	1,468	51.04%	15.10%
United Farmers	Douglas C . Breton	1,408	48.96%	3.83%
Total		2,876	–	–
Rejected, spoiled and declined		137	–	–
Eligible electors / turnout		4,623	65.17%	-7.01%
Liberal gain from United Farmers		Swing		N/A
Source(s) Source: "Leduc Official Results 1930 Alberta general election". Alberta Heritage Community Foundation.

=== 1935 ===
1935 Alberta general election
Party	Candidate	Votes	%	±%
Social Credit	Ronald E. Ansley	2,940	61.66%	–
Liberal	Arthur Percy Mitchell	1,305	27.37%	-23.67%
United Farmers	J. E. Cook	357	7.49%	-41.47%
Conservative	M. E. Von Amerongen	166	3.48%	–
Total		4,768	–	–
Rejected, spoiled and declined		135	–	–
Eligible electors / turnout		5,978	82.02%	16.84%
Social Credit gain from Liberal		Swing		16.10%
Source(s) Source: "Leduc Official Results 1935 Alberta general election". Alberta Heritage Community Foundation.

R.J.E. (Ernie) Cook (1890–1979) farmed south of Calmar. He was provincial president of the CCF in the 1940s. He authored the booklet The UFA Experiment, 1920-1935 A Personal Recollection (Alberta Woodsworth House Association, 1985).

=== 1940 ===
1940 Alberta general election
Party	Candidate	Votes	%	±%
Social Credit	Ronald E. Ansley	2,141	53.81%	-7.85%
Independent	J. A. Rivard	1,106	27.80%	–
Co-operative Commonwealth	A. E. Faulkner	732	18.40%	–
Total		3,979	–	–
Rejected, spoiled and declined		223	–	–
Eligible electors / turnout		6,380	65.86%	-16.16%
Social Credit hold		Swing		-4.14%
Source(s) Source: "Leduc Official Results 1940 Alberta general election". Alberta Heritage Community Foundation.

=== 1944 ===
1944 Alberta general election
Party	Candidate	Votes	%	±%
Social Credit	Ronald E. Ansley	2,764	67.33%	13.53%
Co-operative Commonwealth	J. E. Cook	1,186	28.89%	10.50%
Labor-Progressive	H. V. Broadbent	155	3.78%	–
Total		4,105	–	–
Rejected, spoiled and declined		74	–	–
Eligible electors / turnout		6,218	67.21%	1.35%
Social Credit hold		Swing		6.21%
Source(s) Source: "Leduc Official Results 1944 Alberta general election". Alberta Heritage Community Foundation.

=== 1948 ===
1948 Alberta general election
Party	Candidate	Votes	%	±%
Social Credit	Ronald E. Ansley	2,548	58.03%	-9.30%
Co-operative Commonwealth	John King	1,071	24.39%	-4.50%
Liberal	John Edward Duggan	772	17.58%	–
Total		4,391	–	–
Rejected, spoiled and declined		333	–	–
Eligible electors / turnout		7,716	61.22%	-5.98%
Social Credit hold		Swing		-2.40%
Source(s) Source: "Leduc Official Results 1948 Alberta general election". Alberta Heritage Community Foundation.

=== 1952 ===
1952 Alberta general election
Party	Candidate	Votes	%	±%
First count
Independent Social Credit	Ronald E. Ansley	2,051	44.70%	–
Co-operative Commonwealth	Andrew Borys	1,331	29.00%	4.61%
Social Credit	George H. Thompson	1,207	26.30%	-31.73%
Total		4,589	–	–
Ballot transfer results
Independent Social Credit	Ronald E. Ansley	2,035	52.10%	–
Co-operative Commonwealth	Andrew Borys	1,871	47.90%	–
Total		3,906	–	–
Rejected, spoiled and declined		368	–	–
Eligible electors / turnout		7,803	63.66%	2.44%
Independent Social Credit gain from Social Credit		Swing		N/A
Source(s) Source: "Leduc Official Results 1952 Alberta general election". Alberta Heritage Community Foundation. Instant-runoff voting requires a candidate to receive a plurality (greater than 50%) of the votes. As no candidate received a plurality of votes, the bottom candidate was eliminated and their 2nd place votes were applied to both other candidates until one received a plurality

=== 1955 ===
1955 Alberta general election
Party	Candidate	Votes	%	±%
First count
Independent Social Credit	Ronald E. Ansley	1,338	27.92%	-16.78%
Co-operative Commonwealth	Andrew Borys	1,147	23.94%	-5.06%
Liberal	W. F. Borgstede	963	20.10%	–
Social Credit	A. E. Zeiner	950	19.82%	-6.48%
Conservative	Emanuel Prycz	394	8.22%	–
Total		4,792	–	–
Ballot transfer results
Independent Social Credit	Ronald E. Ansley	2,035	52.10%	–
Liberal	W. F. Borgstede	1,871	47.90%	–
Total		3,906	–	–
Rejected, spoiled and declined		345	–	–
Eligible electors / turnout		5,137	68.20%	4.54%
Independent Social Credit hold		Swing		N/A
Source(s) Source: "Leduc Official Results 1955 Alberta general election". Alberta Heritage Community Foundation. Instant-runoff voting requires a candidate to receive a plurality (greater than 50%) of the votes. As no candidate received a plurality of votes, the bottom candidate was eliminated and their 2nd place votes were applied to both other candidates until one received a plurality

=== 1959 ===
1959 Alberta general election
Party	Candidate	Votes	%	±%
Independent Social Credit	Ronald E. Ansley	2,334	51.82%	23.90%
Progressive Conservative	Peter Wyllie	1,494	33.17%	–
Co-operative Commonwealth	Andrew Borys	676	15.01%	-8.93%
Total		4,504	–	–
Rejected, spoiled and declined		8	–	–
Eligible electors / turnout		7,113	63.43%	-4.77%
Independent Social Credit hold		Swing		N/A
Source(s) Source: "Leduc Official Results 1959 Alberta general election". Alberta Heritage Community Foundation.

=== 1963 ===
1963 Alberta general election
Party	Candidate	Votes	%	±%
Social Credit	James Douglas Henderson	1,898	39.86%	–
Progressive Conservative	Peter Wyllie	971	20.39%	-12.78%
Independent Social Credit	Ronald E. Ansley	731	15.35%	-36.47%
New Democratic	Andrew Borys	613	12.87%	-2.14%
Liberal	Ron Hayter	461	9.68%	–
Alberta Unity Movement	Michael F. Hold	88	1.85%	–
Total		4,762	–	–
Rejected, spoiled and declined		14	–	–
Eligible electors / turnout		7,574	63.06%	-0.38%
Social Credit gain from Independent Social Credit		Swing		0.41%
Source(s) Source: "Leduc Official Results 1963 Alberta general election". Alberta Heritage Community Foundation.

=== 1967 ===
1967 Alberta general election
Party	Candidate	Votes	%	±%
Social Credit	James Douglas Henderson	2,193	45.66%	5.80%
Progressive Conservative	Emanuel Prycz	1,206	25.11%	4.72%
New Democratic	Alex A. Sklarenko	1,021	21.26%	8.38%
Liberal	Russell Olekshy	383	7.97%	-1.71%
Total		4,803	–	–
Rejected, spoiled and declined		29	–	–
Eligible electors / turnout		7,578	63.76%	0.71%
Social Credit hold		Swing		0.54%
Source(s) Source: "Leduc Official Results 1967 Alberta general election". Alberta Heritage Community Foundation.

=== 1993 ===
1993 Alberta general election
Party	Candidate	Votes	%	±%
Liberal	Terry Kirkland	6,823	49.76%	–
Progressive Conservative	Donald H. Sparrow	5,884	42.91%	–
New Democratic	Jeff Lambert	812	5.92%	–
Natural Law	Larry Bogart	192	1.40%	–
Total		13,711	–	–
Rejected, spoiled and declined		15	–	–
Eligible electors / turnout		21,200	64.75%	–
Liberal pickup new district.				
Source(s) Source: "Leduc Official Results 1993 Alberta general election". Alberta Heritage Community Foundation.

=== 1997 ===
1997 Alberta general election
Party	Candidate	Votes	%	±%
Progressive Conservative	Albert Klapstein	6,857	51.51%	8.60%
Liberal	Terry Kirkland	4,797	36.04%	-13.73%
Social Credit	Henry Neumann	891	6.69%	–
New Democratic	Bill Schlacht	767	5.76%	-0.16%
Total		13,312	–	–
Rejected, spoiled and declined		24	–	–
Eligible electors / turnout		22,244	59.95%	-4.79%
Progressive Conservative gain from Liberal		Swing		4.31%
Source(s) Source: "Leduc Official Results 1997 Alberta general election". Alberta Heritage Community Foundation.

=== 2001 ===
2001 Alberta general election
Party	Candidate	Votes	%	±%
Progressive Conservative	Albert Klapstein	9,235	67.08%	15.57%
Liberal	Joyce Assen	3,575	25.97%	-10.07%
New Democratic	Leilani O'Malley	957	6.95%	1.19%
Total		13,767	–	–
Rejected, spoiled and declined		81	–	–
Eligible electors / turnout		24,286	57.02%	-2.93%
Progressive Conservative hold		Swing		12.82%
Source(s) Source: "Leduc Official Results 2001 Alberta general election". Alberta Heritage Community Foundation.

== Plebiscite results ==
=== 1957 liquor plebiscite ===
1957 Alberta liquor plebiscite results: Grande Prairie
Question A: Do you approve additional types of outlets for the sale of beer, wine and spirituous liquor subject to a local vote?
Ballot choice	Votes	%
Yes	1,701	62.95%
No	1,001	37.05%
Total votes	2,702	100%
Rejected, spoiled and declined	10	
6,996 eligible electors, turnout 38.77%

On October 30, 1957, a stand-alone plebiscite was held province wide in all 50 of the then current provincial electoral districts in Alberta. The government decided to consult Alberta voters to decide on liquor sales and mixed drinking after a divisive debate in the Legislature. The plebiscite was intended to deal with the growing demand for reforming antiquated liquor control laws.

The plebiscite was conducted in two parts. Question A asked in all districts, asked the voters if the sale of liquor should be expanded in Alberta, while Question B asked in a handful of districts within the corporate limits of Calgary and Edmonton asked if men and woman were allowed to drink together in establishments.

Province wide Question A of the plebiscite passed in 33 of the 50 districts while Question B passed in all five districts. Leduc voted in favour of the proposal by a near landslide majority. Voter turnout in the district was abysmal, falling well under the province wide average of 46%.

Official district returns were released to the public on December 31, 1957. The Social Credit government in power at the time did not considered the results binding. However the results of the vote led the government to repeal all existing liquor legislation and introduce an entirely new Liquor Act.

Municipal districts lying inside electoral districts that voted against the Plebiscite were designated Local Option Zones by the Alberta Liquor Control Board and considered effective dry zones, business owners that wanted a licence had to petition for a binding municipal plebiscite in order to be granted a licence.

== See also ==
- List of Alberta provincial electoral districts
- Canadian provincial electoral districts
