= Telford (disambiguation) =

Telford is a town in Shropshire, England.

Telford also commonly refers to Thomas Telford (1757–1834), Scottish civil engineer, namesake of the town

Telford may also refer to:

== Places ==
- Telford, Victoria, Australia, a small locality
- Telford Cut, a coal mine in South Australia
- Telford Lake, Alberta, Canada
- Telford (UK Parliament constituency), England
- Telford, Pennsylvania, United States, a borough
- Telford, Tennessee, United States, a census-designated place
- Telford, Washington, United States, an unincorporated community
- Telford Plaza, a place in Hong Kong

== Sport ==
- A.F.C. Telford United, an English football team
- Telford Raiders, an English rugby league team
- Telford Tigers, an English ice hockey team
- Telford United F.C., a defunct English football team

== People and fictional characters ==
- Telford (surname), a list of people and fictional characters
- Telford Taylor (1908–1998), American lawyer and brigadier general, prosecutor at the Nuremberg trials

== Other uses ==
- Telford (Southern Institute of Technology), vocational training school in Otago, New Zealand
- Edinburgh's Telford College, Scotland, a further education college
- Telford Medal, the highest prize awarded by the British Institution of Civil Engineers
- Telford Shopping Centre, the commercial centre of the town of Telford, England
- Telford FM, an English radio station
