= Hutlinana Hot Springs =

Geothermal spring in Alaska, U.S.

Coordinates: 65°12′33″N 149°59′33″W

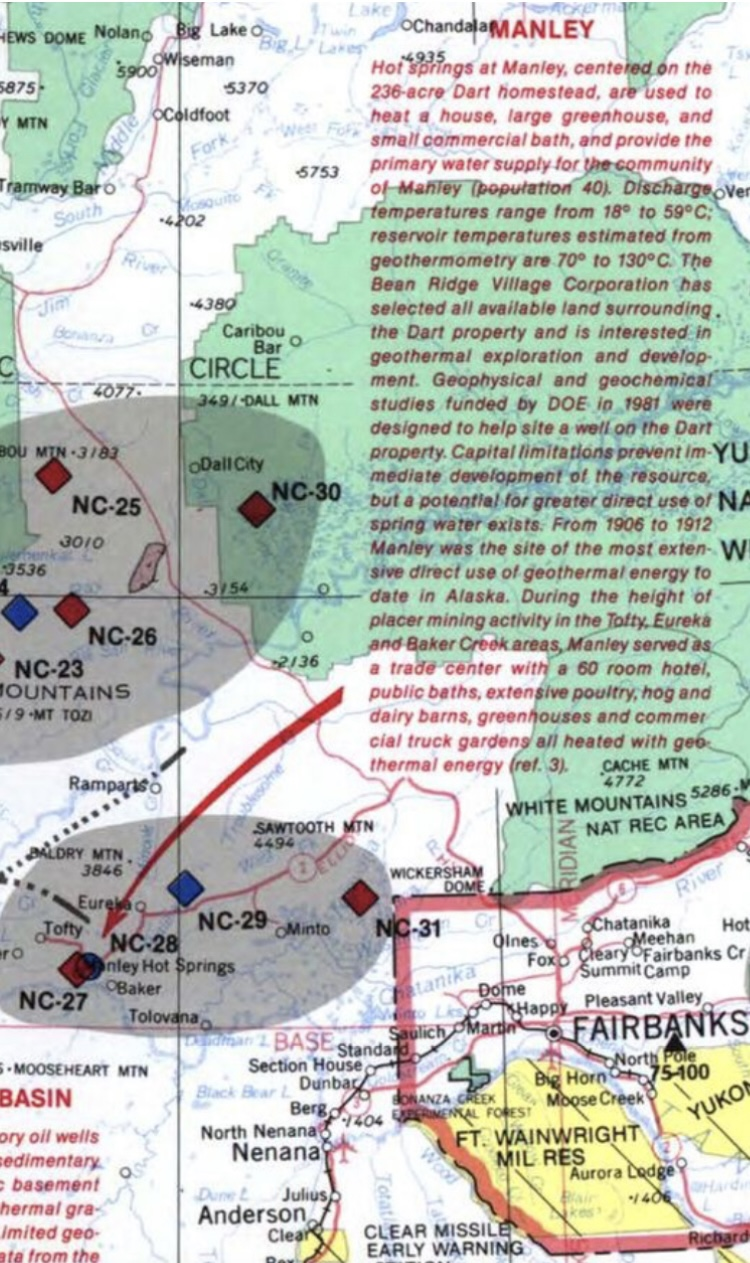
- Hutliana Hot Springs (NC-29) and nearby Manley Hot Springs depicted on a 1980 NOAA map
- Interactive map of Hutlinana Hot Springs
- Elevation: 281 m (922 ft)
- Type: geothermal
- Discharge: 400 L/min (110 US gal/min)
- Temperature: 41 °C (106 °F)

Hutlinana is a geothermal spring located on right bank of Hutlinana Creek, 21 miles southeast of Rampart, Yukon-Tanana Highway, east of the Elliott Highway in interior Alaska, approximately 150 miles northwest of Fairbanks. There is no direct road access. The trail is used primarily in winter after freeze-up.

== Location ==
The spring lies within Yukon–Koyukuk Census Area. The trailhead is located at mile 128 of the Elliot Highway, before the highway crosses the bridge heading towards Manley over the Hutlinana River. The best trailhead has been reported to be the fourth pullout/driveway/road eastern side of the Elliot. There is often no clearly designated parking area located directly at the trailhead.

== History ==
The springs were reportedly named by prospectors.

== Water profile ==
The temperature of the spring water pool is approximately 106 °F (41 °C). A short stone dividing wall separates the pool from the cold Hutlinana River. Proximity to the warm water of the spring allows the river to stay open through the winter.

== Access ==
There is no officially managed or maintained trail to Hutlinana Springs. However, some years volunteers have reportedly left trail markers such as ribbons and socks tied to trees. While routes may be usable with the help of log bridges during other times of the year, perhaps Hutlinana's best accessibility is during the winter season, after freezing temperatures and snowfall allow a trail to be formed. The trail, depending on the winter, is approximately 6–8 miles (10–13 km) in length, primarily over flat to bumpy terrain of frozen muskeg and forest. Later in the spring, icy river overflow may be present on the trail. The trail is used by snowmachines, skiers, and snowshoe hikers. Trail users, particularly those with dogs, are strongly cautioned to be aware of any trapping equipment alongside the trail, as there have been reports of live traps close by.

== Amenities ==
There are no facilities located at the Springs. However, in some winter seasons a friendly trapper leaves his winter tent open for travelers to use.

== See also ==
- List of hot springs in the United States § Alaska
