= MLY =

MLY may refer to:

- Manley Hot Springs Airport, Alaska, IATA and FAA LID airport code
- Morley railway station, West Yorkshire, National Rail station code
- Methyllysine, Protein Data Bank code

== See also ==
- Megalight-year, abbreviated Mly
