= Douglas Breton =

Canadian politician

Douglas Corney Breton
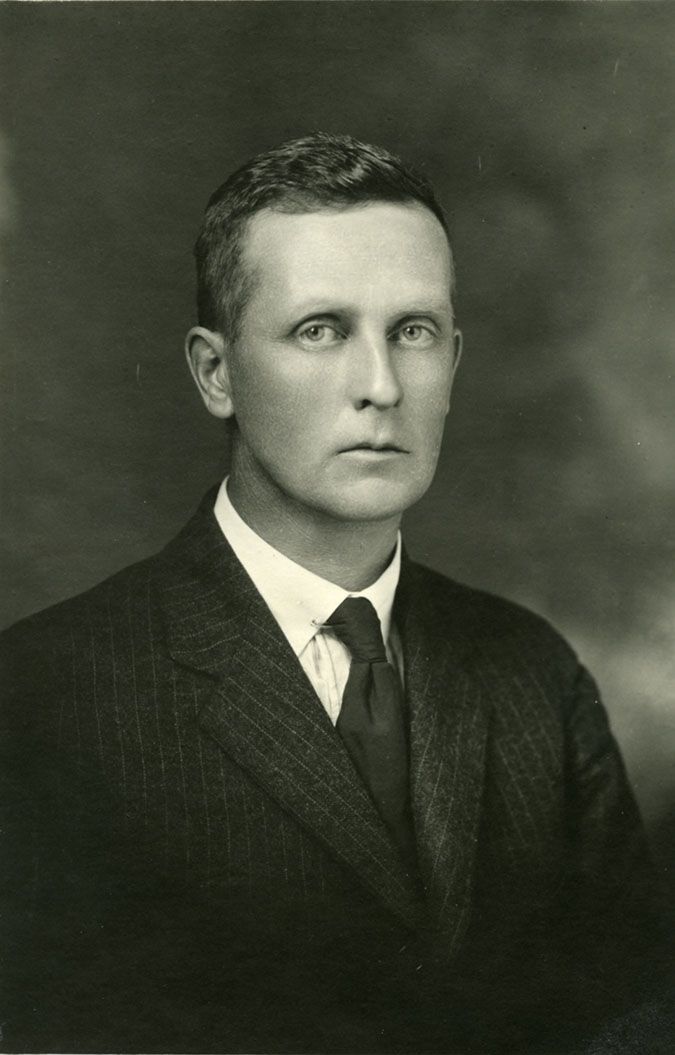

Member of the Legislative Assembly of Alberta
- In office 28 June 1926 – 19 June 1930
- Preceded by: Stanley Tobin
- Succeeded by: Arthur Mitchell
- Constituency: Leduc

Personal details
- Born: 25 November 1883 Simon's Town, Cape Colony
- Died: 11 February 1953 (aged 69) Winchester, England
- Party: United Farmers
- Spouse: Dorothy Blanche Frost
- Occupation: farmer, merchant, soldier and politician

Military service
- Branch/service: British Expeditionary Force
- Years of service: 1914-1919
- Battles/wars: World War I

Douglas Corney Breton (25 November 1883 – 11 February 1953) was a Canadian farmer, soldier and a provincial politician. He served as a United Farmers of Alberta member of the Legislative Assembly of Alberta from 1926 to 1930.

== Early life ==
Douglas Corney Breton was born 25 November 1883 at Simon's Town, Cape Colony to William Edwards Breton (1852 – 1914) an Inspector General of the Royal British Navy, and Alice Maud, the daughter of Jules Dudoit, French Consul to the Hawaiian Islands.

Breton moved to Canada at the age of 20 in 1904. He settled at Telfordville near Leduc and became a prominent farmer and merchant there. He also was appointed election returning officer and was involved in local government in the Strawberry district.

He served in World War I as a member of the British Expeditionary Force in Afghanistan and India. He was captain of the Machine Gun Corps from 1914 to 1919.

On 24 January 1920, Breton married Dorothy Blanche Frost, the daughter of Mark Edwin Prescott Frost OBE ISO. They came as a couple back to his farm in Alberta. Together they had two children.

== Political career ==
Breton ran for a seat in the 1926 Alberta general election as a United Farmers candidate in the electoral district of Leduc. In the three-way race, he and the Liberal candidate were close in votes, with the Conservative in distant third place. No candidate had majority of votes in the first round. Under the rules of instant-runoff voting, the election method in use at the time, the least-popular candidate, the Conservative candidate, was eliminated and his votes transferred according to the back-up preference marked thereon if any. The transfer gave Breton a majority of the votes, and he won the seat for his party.

A year after being elected to office the name of the village of Keystone, Alberta was changed to Breton in 1927 in his honor.

Breton ran for a second term in office in the 1930 Alberta general election. He was defeated in a close two-way race, losing by just 60 votes to Liberal candidate Arthur Percy Mitchell.

== Later life ==
Breton moved to England in 1934, and died in Winchester on 11 February 1953 at the age of 69.
