= Rocky Springs Segment of the Whoop-Up Trail =

Historical trade route in Montana

- U.S. National Register of Historic Places
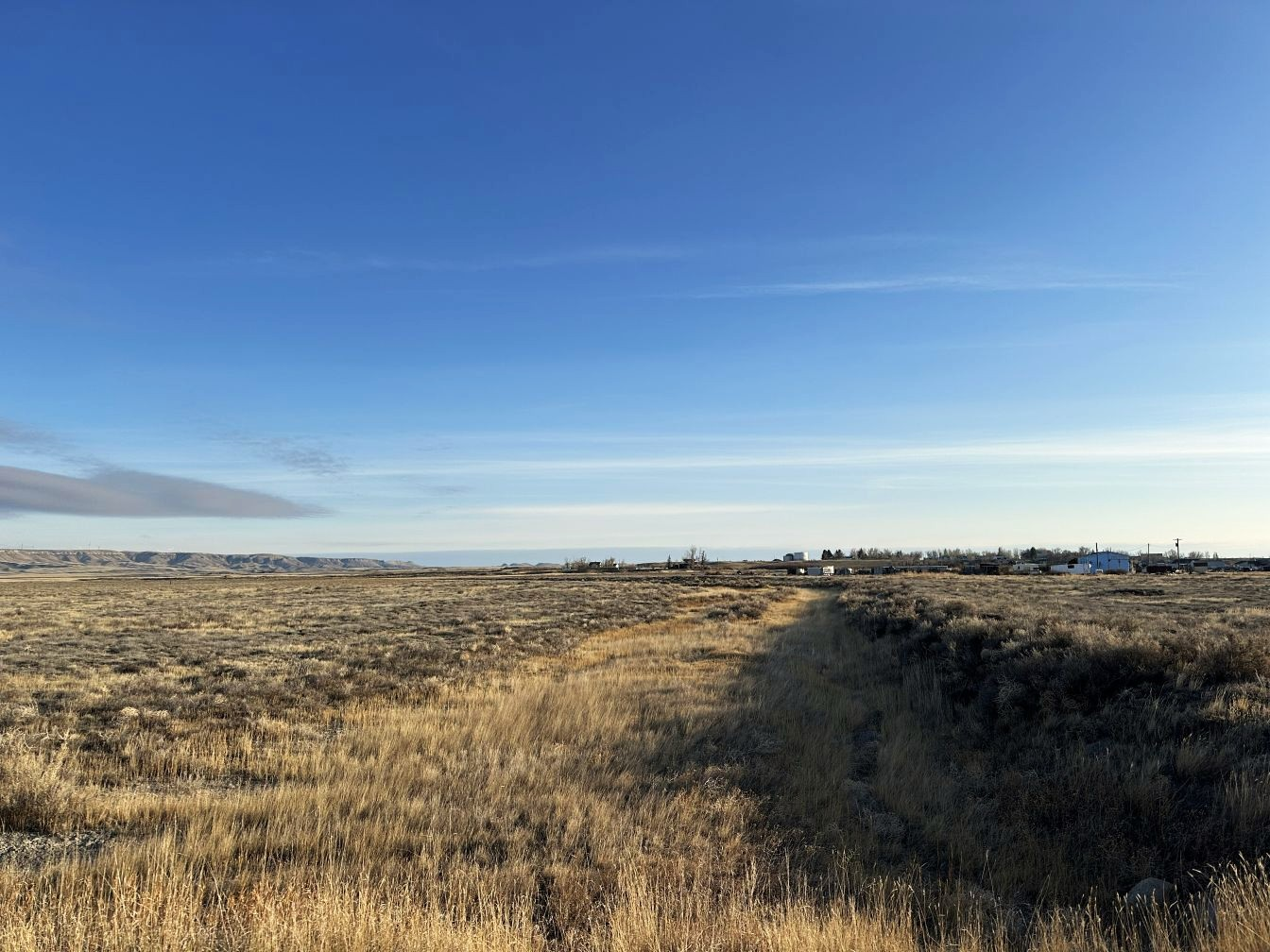
- Nearest city: Kevin, Montana
- Built: 1870
- MPS: Whoop-Up Trail of Northcentral Montana MPS
- NRHP reference No.: 93000278
- Added to NRHP: April 15, 1993

The Rocky Springs Segment of the Whoop-Up Trail was the location of campsites for travellers along the Whoop-Up Trail between Fort Benton, Montana, and Fort Hamilton, Alberta, in the 19th century. In 1991, it was the best-preserved segment of the Whoop-Up Trail within Montana and it included rut tracks still visible and the surrounding landscape was mostly natural. The numerous small springs in the area were mostly dried up by 1991 "due to modern cultivation and resultant ground water changes". It was listed on the National Register of Historic Places in 1993.

A National Register study of the Whoop-Up Trail included "Diamond R. Brown's account of being caught in a tremendous snowstorm in 1871 at Rocky Springs":

the cold was almost unendurable, whiskey froze,
coal oil became thick slush, our horses chewed
the wagon boxes and consumed a dozen brooms.
Many of the animals froze to death.

The Whoop-Up Trail, extending from Fort Benton, Montana, to Fort Hamilton, Alberta, was, initially, a trade route between Montana and the southern region of now Alberta, then known as Rupert's Land, and controlled by a British fur trading company, the Hudson's Bay Company. In 1869, negotiations were taking place to transfer control to Canada. Several American traders took advantage of lack of policing in the area and set up trading posts. In addition to their usual trade goods such as guns, metal implements and blankets, they began supplying adulterated alcohol known as "firewater", to the Blackfeet, for buffalo robes, horses and anything else of value. Several posts were established and one of the earliest was Fort Hamilton, in 1869, which burnt down and was replaced by another in 1870, near Lethbridge, Alberta, which became known as Fort Whoop-Up. This trade continued until the arrival of the North-West Mounted Police, in October 1874, when it was considerably curtailed by their establishment of Fort Macleod. Whoop Up trail continued to be the main supply route from Fort Benton into the north for mostly legitimate goods. The arrival of the railways in the 1880s ended its usefulness.

== See also ==
- Macleod-Benton Trail
