= Stanley Tobin =

Canadian politician

Stanley Gilbert Tobin
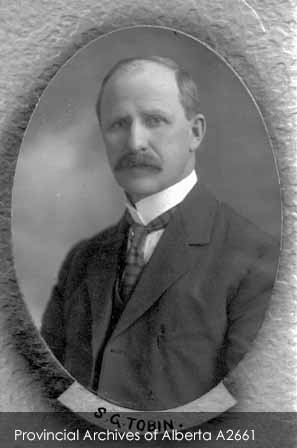

Member of the Legislative Assembly of Alberta
- In office March 25, 1913 – October 17, 1925
- Preceded by: Robert Telford
- Succeeded by: Douglas Breton
- Constituency: Leduc

Member of the Canadian House of Commons
- In office 1925–1926
- Preceded by: District Established
- Succeeded by: William Irvine
- Constituency: Wetaskiwin

Personal details
- Born: January 19, 1871 Bridgewater, Nova Scotia
- Died: June 12, 1948 (aged 77)
- Party: Alberta Liberal Party; Liberal Party of Canada
- Occupation: politician

Stanley Gilbert Tobin (January 19, 1871 - June 12, 1948) was a farmer, businessman, teacher and political figure in Alberta, Canada. Tobin served as a Member of the Legislative Assembly of Alberta and a Member of the House of Commons of Canada.

Born in Bridgewater, Nova Scotia, Tobin ran in the Leduc provincial electoral district in the 1913 Alberta general election. He was elected in a hotly contested election by just over 100 votes against Conservative George Curry.

He would see re-election in 1917 and in 1921. His plurality in the 1921 election was just 10 votes.

Stanley vacated his provincial seat in 1925 to run in the 1925 Canadian federal election in the Wetaskiwin Federal electoral district. He won election as a member of the Liberal Party of Canada. In that election he defeated incumbent Progressive incumbent Daniel Webster Warner.

He only served in office for one year and was defeated in the 1926 Canadian Federal Election by William Irvine.

Legislative Assembly of Alberta
Preceded by Robert Telford	MLA Leduc; 1913–1925	Succeeded by Douglas Breton
Parliament of Canada
Preceded by New district	Member of Parliament Wetaskiwin; 1925-1926	Succeeded by William Irvine
