= Telford (surname) =

Telford is the surname of:

== People ==
- Anthony Telford (born 1966), American retired Major League Baseball pitcher
- Bill Telford, New Zealand rugby league player in the 1920s and coach in the '50s and '60s
- Billy Telford (born 1956), English former footballer
- Carly Telford (born 1987), English footballer
- Dick Telford (born 1945), Australian sports scientist and former Australian rules footballer
- Dom Telford (born 1996), English footballer
- Don Telford (c. 1902 – c. 1980), Australian rugby union player
- Emma Paddock Telford (1851-1920), American writer, war correspondent, editor, traveler
- Erastus D. Telford (1874–1936), American lawyer and politician
- James Lyle Telford (1889–1960), Canadian politician, mayor of Vancouver
- Katie Telford, Canadian political strategist and chief of staff to Prime Minister Justin Trudeau
- Lisa Telford, Haida weaver
- Mary Jewett Telford (1839–1906), American Civil War nurse and humanitarian
- Ray Telford (born 1946), Canadian soccer player
- Robert Telford (1860–1933), Canadian pioneer and politician
- Thomas Telford (1757–1834), Scottish civil engineer
- William Pattison Telford, Sr. (1836–1922), Canadian banker and Member of Parliament
- William Pattison Telford, Jr. (1867–1955), Canadian Member of Parliament, son of the above
- Zoe Telford (born 1973), English actress

== Fictional characters ==
- Chibs Telford, in the television series Sons of Anarchy, played by Tommy Flanagan
- David Telford, in the television series Stargate Universe, played by Lou Diamond Phillips
