= Dallas Schmidt =

Canadian politician

Dallas Wilbur Schmidt
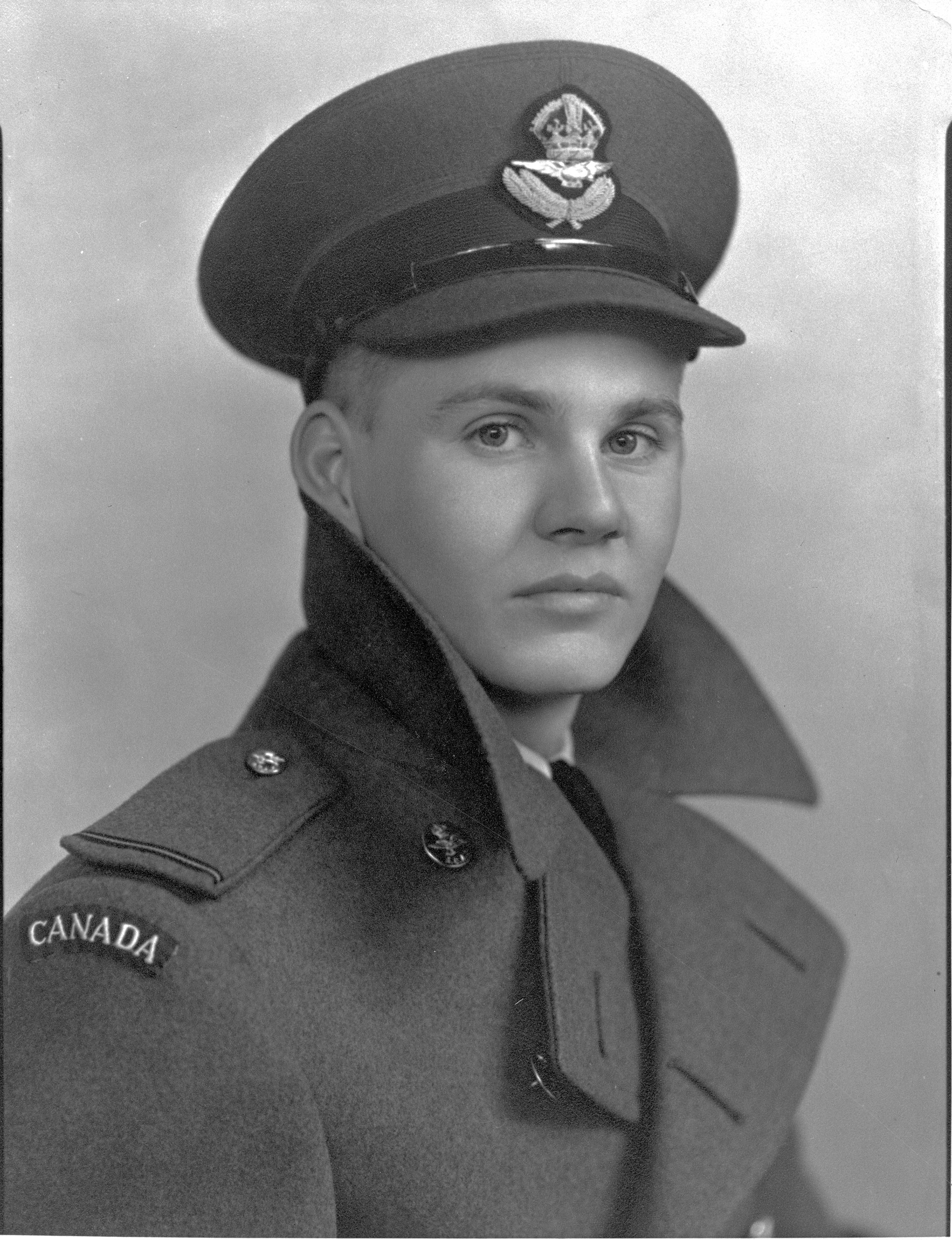
- Schmidt in RCAF uniform, c. 1945

Member of the Legislative Assembly of Alberta
- In office March 25, 1975 – November 2, 1982
- Preceded by: James Henderson
- Succeeded by: Donald Sparrow
- Constituency: Wetaskiwin-Leduc

Minister without Portfolio
- In office April 3, 1975 – August 29, 1976

Associate Minister of Energy and Natural Resources responsible for Public Lands
- In office August 30, 1976 – March 22, 1979

Minister of Agriculture
- In office March 23, 1979 – November 18, 1982
- Preceded by: Marvin Moore
- Succeeded by: LeRoy Fjordbotten

Personal details
- Born: August 9, 1922 Wetaskiwin, Alberta
- Died: November 22, 2007 (aged 85)
- Party: Progressive Conservative
- Occupation: Pilot, politician
- Awards: Distinguished Flying Cross and Bar

Military service
- Allegiance: Canada
- Branch/service: Royal Canadian Air Force
- Years of service: January 8, 1942 - September 12, 1945; 1951 - 1956
- Unit: EFTS No. 18, SFTS 15 OTU No. 2, Squadron 227, 236 and 404,

Dallas Wilbur Schmidt, DFC & Bar, (August 9, 1922 – November 22, 2007) was a Canadian fighter pilot and flying ace with the Royal Canadian Air Force during the Second World War. He later served in the Legislative Assembly of Alberta from 1975 to 1982 as a member of the Progressive Conservative Party. During his time in public office he served as a cabinet minister in different portfolios in the government of Peter Lougheed.

Born in Camrose, Alberta, Schmidt grew up in Millet, Alberta.

== Personal life ==
Dallas Wilbur Schmidt was born August 9, 1922, to parents Herbert Julius Anton Schmidt (1902–1980), and Gertha Lenna (née Nilsson) Schmidt (1903–1969), the oldest of their three children, he had two younger sisters, Iona and Shirley. His paternal grandfather, Christian Schmidt, had immigrated with his family from Germany first to the United States and then later to the Wetaskiwin area in the early 1900s. His maternal grandparents, Peter Nilsson and Johanna (née Johansdotter) Nilsson had come to Canada from Sweden when his mother was a small child.

The family moved to Millet, Alberta, in 1931, when Herbert Schmidt became a buyer for the National Grain Company. He completed his schooling in Millet in June 1940, and enlisted into the RCAF two weeks before his 18th birthday two months later. In April 1946 he married Christine Somerville, and they had three children.

He went into the construction business in 1950, but rejoined the RCAF in 1951. After rejoining, Dallas trained NATO pilots in Gimli, Manitoba, and in Moose Jaw, Saskatchewan. In February 1956, he and his family moved to Bonnie Glen and he started farming in the livestock business.

He died in November 2007, and is buried in Wetaskiwin, Alberta.

His flight suits and service dress uniforms are now on permanent display at the local museum in Millet.

== Air Force career ==
Schmidt volunteered for service in the RCAF on January 8, 1941, and was trained at Claresholm under the British Commonwealth Air Training Plan. He was quickly shipped overseas to see action in World War II.

In August to December 1942, he was placed in Malta, just off Axis Italy, said at the time to be the hottest place for fighting in the world. He was credited with either 8.5 or 10.5 aerial victories (sources differ), including two large Junkers troop-carrying planes, and with sinking two ships.

He was awarded the Distinguished Flying Cross on October 16, 1942, and then the bar in December, for his daring and destructive sorties.

During the war he served in No. 227 Squadron. He flew a wide range of military aircraft used by Canada at the time. His aircraft was shot down by enemy fire on five occasions. On 25 December 1942 he parachuted out of his plane over Malta and through good fortune landed on the island itself, suffering only a twisted leg. He was then transferred to Rhodesia then to Britain where he joined No. 404 Squadron RCAF (the Buffalo Squadron) and attacked German shipping. He came home on leave in August 1943 and was feted as Millet's air ace, before travelling on to visit his parents at Ma-Me-O Beach, Alberta.

After V-E Day, he returned to Canada in July 1945 and was released from service in September of that year.

He re-enlisted in the Air Force and served his second stint from 1951 to 1956.

== Political career ==
Schmidt first ran for a seat to the Alberta Legislature in the 1967 general election in the electoral district of Wetaskiwin. He finished a close second to incumbent Albert Strohschein.

Schmidt ran again in the 1975 general election in the electoral district of Wetaskiwin-Leduc. This time he won by a landslide margin over three other candidates to pick up the seat for the governing Progressive Conservative party.

On April 3, 1975 Premier Peter Lougheed appointed Schmidt Minister without Portfolio. On August 26, 1976 he was appointed Associate Minister of Energy and Natural Resources Responsible for Public Lands. In the 1979 general election he won in a landslide.

Schmidt was promoted to Minister of Agriculture on March 23, 1979 and served in that position until he retired from politics at dissolution of the legislature in 1982.
