= Whoop-Up Trail =

Historical wagon trail

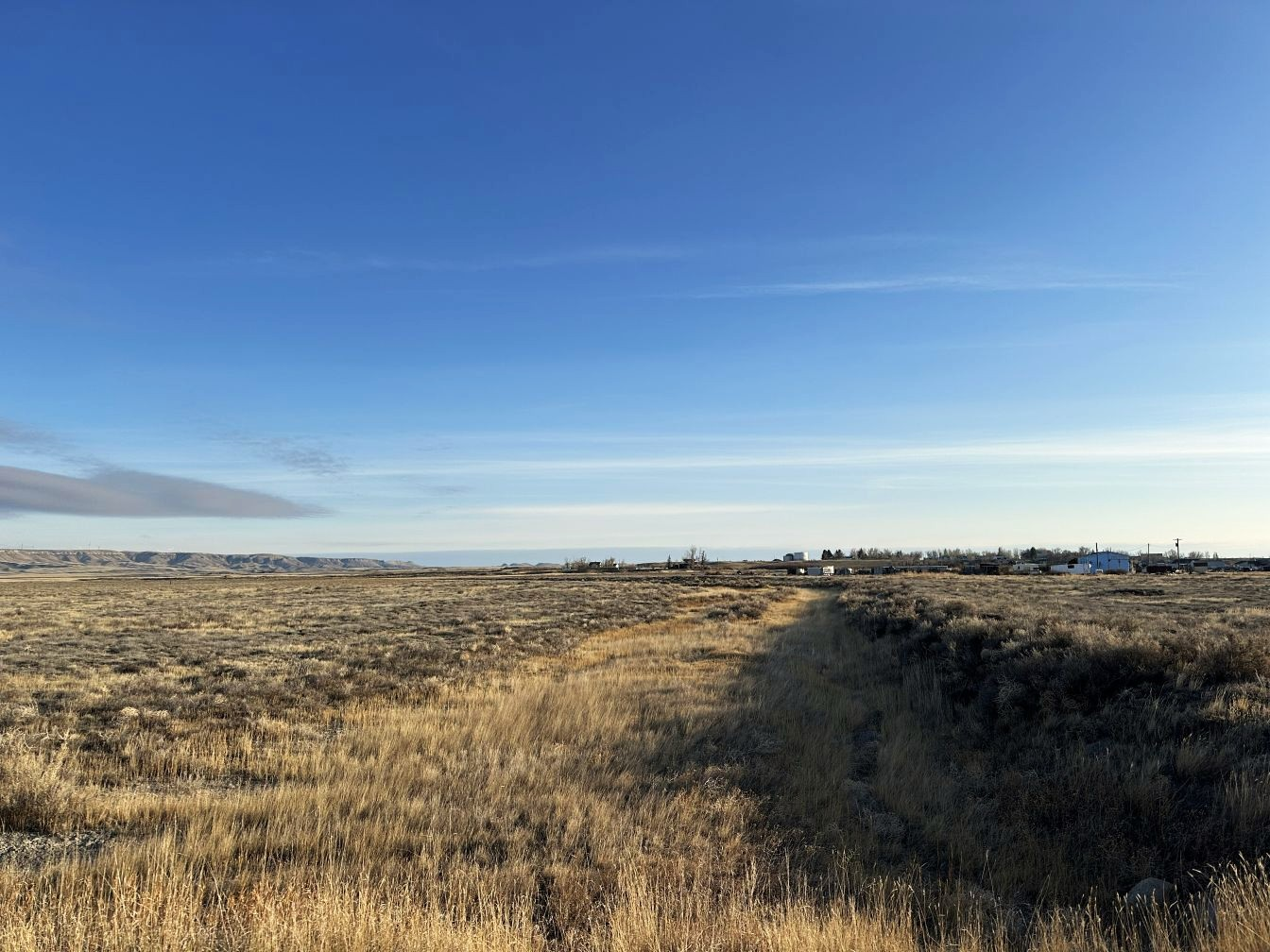
A segment of the Whoop-Up Trail in Toole County, Montana, US, in 2026.

The Whoop-Up Trail, also known as the Macleod-Benton Trail, was a wagon road that connected Fort Benton, Montana Territory, United States, to Fort Hamilton, North-West Territories, Canada.

The trail was initially a trade route between the Montana Territory and the region that later became southern Alberta, which was then part of Rupert's Land and controlled by the Hudson's Bay Company. In 1869, negotiations were taking place to transfer political control to Canada. The company gave its charter for Rupert's Land to Great Britain in 1870.

Free traders took advantage of the lack of policing in the area and set up trading posts. In addition to their usual trade with the Blackfoot of goods such as guns, metal implements and blankets, they began trading adulterated alcohol known as "firewater". The base of whisky had additions like tobacco, ginger, red pepper, and sometimes molasses and red ink for colour. More than 40 "whisky posts" were established. Though many of the posts were named "forts" they were generally simple log cabins. Some of the names were Forts Slide-Out, Stand-Off and Robbers’ Roost. The Blackfoot called the whisky "whoop-up bug juice" but the origin of the trail's name is uncertain. The phrase “whoop it up” was in common use at the time.

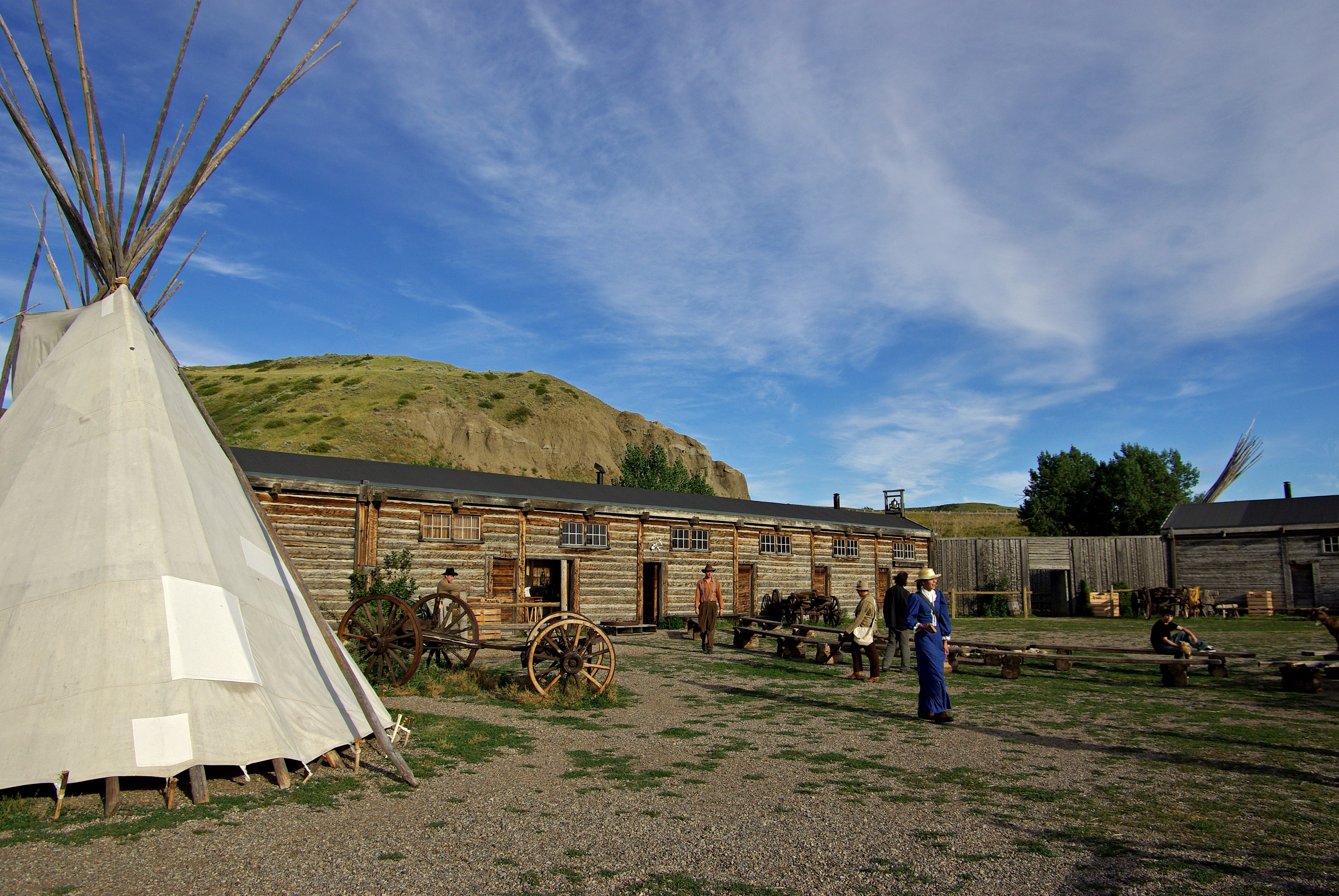
A modern re-creation of Fort Whoop-Up

One of the earliest posts along the trail was Fort Hamilton which was built in 1869 by Fort Benson-based traders John Jerome Healy and Alfred B. Hamilton. This first crude structure was burned. They then hired William Shanks Gladstone, former Hudson’s Bay carpenter, to build a more sturdy post. It was built in 1870 near the future site of Lethbridge. It later became known as Fort Whoop-Up. It burned in 1888 and fully disappeared in a flood in 1915. A few miles north is now the Fort Whoop-Up Interpretive Centre.

After the Cypress Hills Massacre, the Canadian government was determined to stop the whisky trade. The whisky trade continued until 9 October 1874 when the North-West Mounted Police arrived at Fort Whoop-Up. It was considerably curtailed by their establishment of Fort Macleod in 1884. The Whoop Up trail continued to be the main supply route from Fort Benton into the north for more legitimate goods. The trail accounted for one-third of all freight through Fort Benton between 1874 and 1885.

Early traders had a mixed reputation. Some felt they were innovative businessmen who made the country safe to travel. Others viewed them as a destructive force. Most of the traders were young men and several were recently discharged veterans of the American Civil War. The "wolfers" operating out of Fort Benton were generally not well regarded. They used strychnine to kill the wolves so as not to damage pelts with bullet holes or leg damage from traps. Living in small groups, they were often attacked by First Nations people who were especially aggrieved by the deaths of their domesticated dogs. The wolfers were against the traders due to their sales of firearms.

The arrival of the railways in the 1880s ended the trail's usefulness. The Great Falls & Canada Railway, built and first operated in 1890, ran between Great Falls, Montana and Lethbridge. The last bull team passed over the overland route in 1892.

== Route ==
The journey from Fort Benton to Fort Whoop-Up took seven days riding. The long trains of ox-drawn wagons made the 240 miles between Fort Benton and Fort Macleod in 12 to 20 days.

Heading north from Fort Benton the Whoop-Up Trail followed the Teton River. It entered Canada near the Sweet Grass Hills. The trail then split after crossing the Milk River. The east route ended at what is now the north end of Lethbridge, Alberta. The central route went south of Lethbridge to Fort Whoop-up, originally named Fort Hamilton. The western route went to Fort Macleod.

The midway point of the trail was also called Lucille or Froggie's Stopping Place. It is near present-day Conrad, Montana.

No modern road follows the original trail. Interstate 15 and Alberta Highway 4 do travel through some of the same country and showcase the rolling prairies and occasional coulee of the Whoop-Up landscape.

== See also ==
- Rocky Springs Segment of the Whoop-Up Trail
