= Roadhouse (premises) =

Mixed-use premises typically built on or near a major road

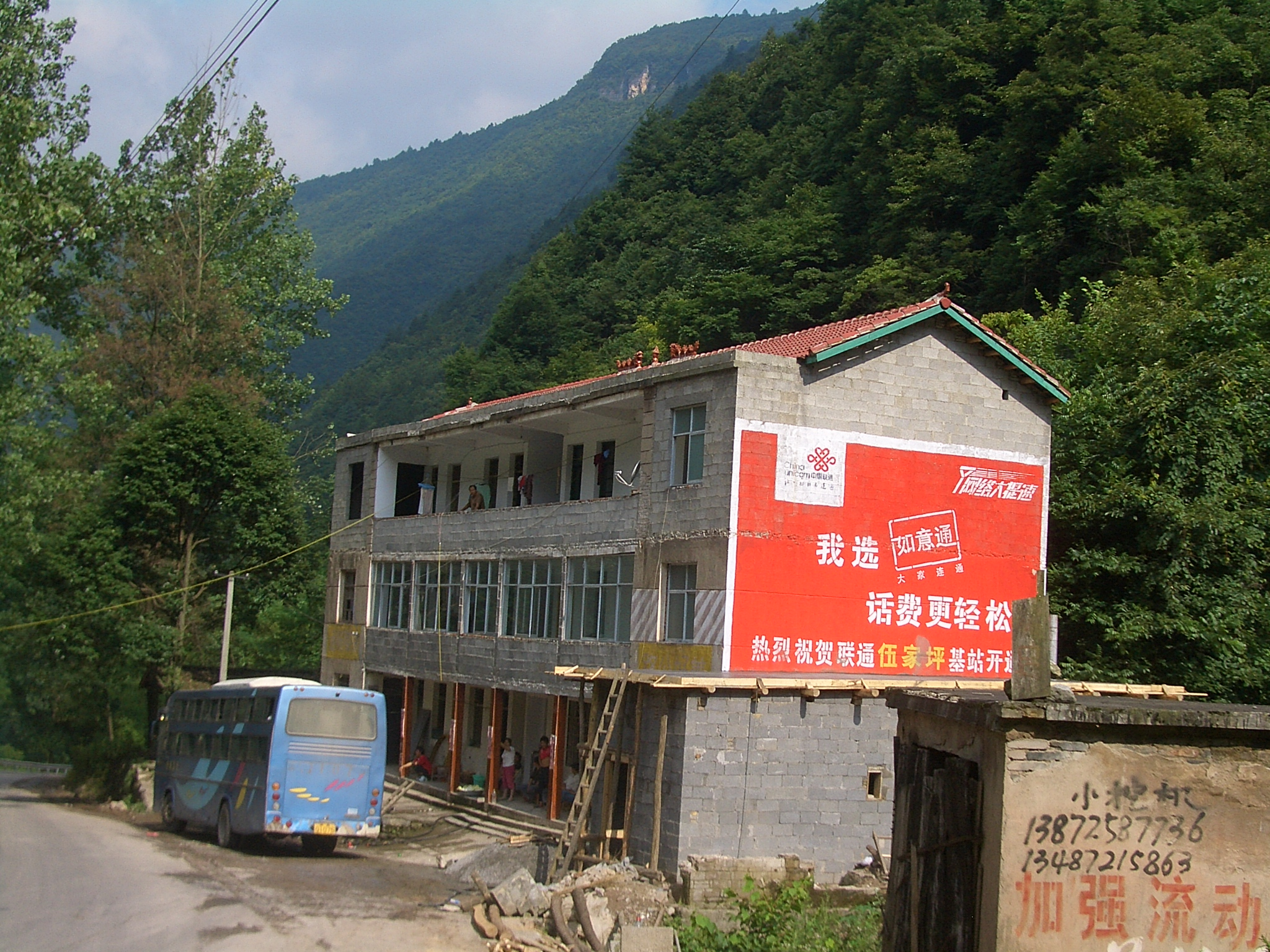
A roadhouse on China National Highway 209 in Gaoqiao Township, Xingshan County, Hubei. It appears to be used as a rest stop for long-distance buses.

A roadhouse, or road house, is a small mixed-use premises, typically built on or near a major road in a sparsely populated area or an isolated desert region, that serves passing travellers, providing food, drinks, accommodation, fuel, and parking spaces to the guests and their vehicles. The premises generally consist of just a single building.

The word's meaning varies somewhat by country. The historical equivalent was often known as a coaching inn, providing food, drinks, and rest to people and horses.

== Australia ==
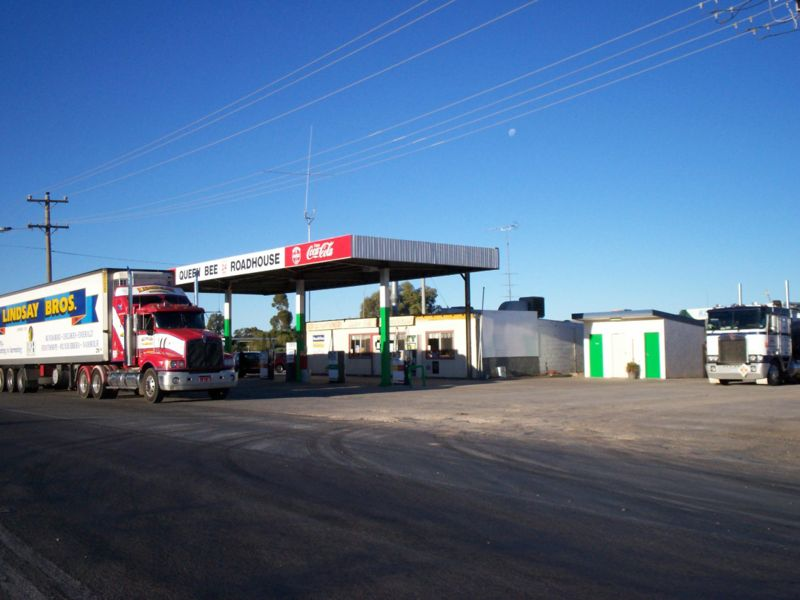
The Queen Bee Roadhouse at Ouyen, Victoria, Australia

In Australia, a roadhouse is a filling station (service station) in many towns outside of major population areas. A roadhouse sells fuel and generally has an attached "restaurant" (like a café or diner) to sell and serve hot food to travellers. Historically, roadhouses served as bus stops for regional services along with mechanical repair and towing services for travellers, though this became less common.

In some areas, such as the Nullarbor Plain, a roadhouse also offers motel-style accommodation and camping facilities. In many areas, the roadhouse may be the only remaining shop and outlet in a town.

Truck stops are like roadhouses but are located on primary intercity routes and at transport hubs within major cities. They provide additional space for short-term parking of heavy vehicles, as well as catering to travellers in private cars.

== Great Britain ==
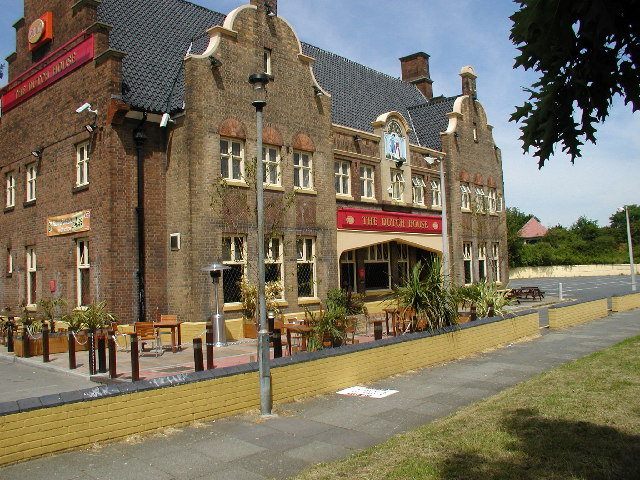
The Dutch House, a typical British 1930s coaching inn on the busy A20 road in Eltham, Greater London

In Great Britain, the early forms of wayside lodgings of this type are coaching inns. As abroad, they were a place along the road for people travelling on foot or by horse to stay at night, but today they are often pub-restaurants without rooms to rent. Many, especially in rural parts, have kept guest accommodation to become bed and breakfasts or country hotels. With the advent of popular travel by motor car in the 1920s and '30s, a new type of roadside pub emerged, often on the new arterial roads and bypasses. They were large establishments offering meals, refreshment and accommodation to motorists and parties travelling by charabanc. The largest pub-restaurants boasted facilities such as tennis courts and swimming pools. Their popularity ended with World War II halting recreational road travel, and the advent, post-war, of the drink driving law thwarted the full recovery of the larger instances. Some out-of-town hotels rely on the breaking of long journeys, such as at the Dartford Crossing and Firth of Forth. The term 'motel' is rarely used.

== North America ==
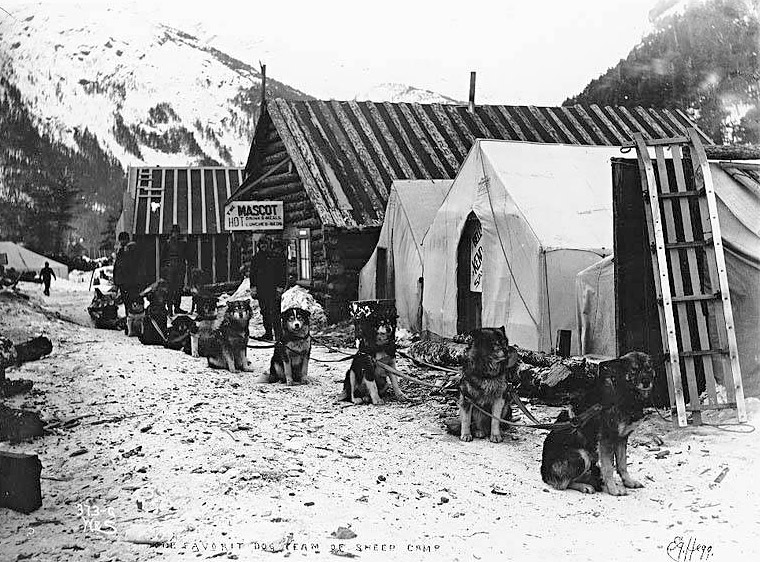
Roadhouses along a trail to Klondike, Yukon, 1898

The "roadhouse" or "road house" acts as a restaurant, serving meals, especially in the evenings. It has a bar serving beer or hard liquor and features music, dancing, and sometimes gambling. Most roadhouses are located along highways or roads in rural areas or on the outskirts of towns. Early roadhouses provided lodging for travelers, but with the advent of faster means of transport than walking, horseback riding, or horse-drawn carriages, few now offer rooms to let. Roadhouses have a slightly disreputable image, similar to honky tonks. This type of roadhouse has been portrayed in movies such as Road House (1948), The Wild One (1953), Easy Rider (1969), and Road House (1989).

Historically, roadhouses sprang up when significant numbers of people began to move to the frontier. In Western Canada they were known as stopping houses. From the 1890s in Alaska and the Yukon, beginning with the gold rush, roadhouses were checkpoints where dog drivers (mushers, or dog sledders), horse-driven sleighs, and people on snowshoes, skis, or walking would stop overnight for shelter and a hot meal. Remains of a Klondike Gold Rush roadhouse can be seen today south of Carmacks, Yukon, along the Klondike Highway. One built in 1902 is the Black Rapids Roadhouse; another still operating is Rika's Landing Roadhouse.

== Spain ==
Post houses (casas de postas) were established in major towns and along principal highways. Post masters provided fresh horses, and sometimes carriages and over-night accommodation for use by Royal officers called Postillones, who were uniformed guides authorised to conduct passengers, goods and messages along specific routes.

== See also ==
- Charging station
- Fast-food restaurant
- Filling station
- Index of drinking establishment–related articles
- List of roadhouses in Western Australia
- Rest area
- Stopping house
