= Stopping house =

Rural lodging in Pacific Northwest used by fur traders and pioneers

A stopping house was a kind of rural lodging used in the Pacific Northwest during the late 19th and early 20th centuries by fur traders and pioneers.

Stopping houses were private residences that also offered room and board and were located on early pioneer trails. They were similar to the coaching inns of Britain and Ireland except that they were not located on well-traveled routes, but on frontier tracks. Eventually, however, scheduled stagecoach services were started in the West.

Stopping houses often became the nucleus of newly formed communities. They generally disappeared after the railway or highway reached an area, and were replaced with railway hotels and motor hotels in the 20th century.

Some examples of stopping houses include Froggie's Stopping Place on the Whoop-Up Trail in Montana, which is listed on the U.S.'s National Register of Historic Places, and Robert Telford's House, on the Calgary-Edmonton Trail, near present-day Leduc, Alberta.
