= Arthur Percy Mitchell =

Canadian politician

Member of the Legislative Assembly of Alberta
- In office July 18, 1930 – August 22, 1935
- Preceded by: Douglas Breton
- Succeeded by: Ronald Ansley
- Constituency: Leduc

Personal details
- Born: 13 April 1880 New Cross, Kent, England
- Died: 20 January 1968 (aged 87)
- Party: United Farmers
- Occupation: politician

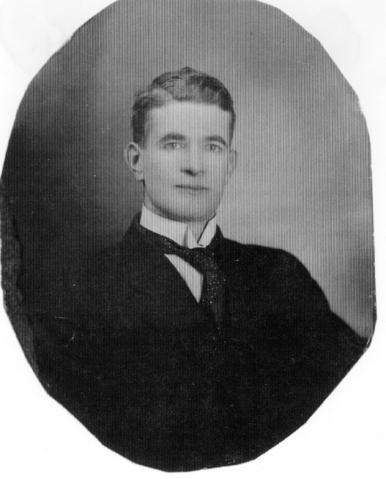
Arthur Percy Mitchell circa 1915

Arthur Percy Mitchell (1880-1968) was a provincial politician from Alberta, Canada. He served as a member of the Legislative Assembly of Alberta from 1930 to 1935 sitting with the Liberal caucus in opposition. He was born in Bristol, England, in 1880. His father was an auctioneer and after his schooling Arthur took up the trade. He worked in his father's show room in Bristol. After his father's death in 1899, Mitchell migrated to Canada. He landed in Edmonton and started an auction partnership with J. H. Reed. Because of his poor health and inability to work in the hot and dusty environment of the sales rooms, he left the business after a few years. He visited England briefly and when he returned, on the advice of his doctor, explored outdoor selling in Millet between 1913 and 1915.

Alice Bullas was born in England and migrated to Canada, ending up in Calgary with her parents and eight siblings. Alice trained as a secretary and worked for a time in the office of the Indian Agent at Hobbema. She met A.P. Mitchell when he came to work in Calgary after 1915. They married and for a few years, operated a general store. In 1919 Mitchell heard of an opportunity to buy a large tin-clad building on the main street of Millet with an office and living quarters above. The family, including daughter Alice, moved to Millet where he began to specialize in farm sales. Mitchell operated Mitchell Sales and Mitchell's Auctions as well as running a real estate and insurance agency. The building was destroyed in 1927 in the general fire in Millet. At that time Mitchell was also serving as Mayor for the town. He also served as a councillor, as a member of the Board of Trade and on the School Board. The Mitchells retired to Vancouver for several years and then returned to Edmonton. Alice died in 1967 and Arthur in 1968, they are buried together in Mount Pleasant Cemetery.

== Political career ==
Mitchell ran for a seat to the Alberta Legislature in the 1930 Alberta general election as a candidate under the Liberal banner in the Leduc electoral district. He defeated incumbent Douglas Breton in a hotly contested two-way race by 60 votes to pick up the district for his party.

Mitchell ran for a second term in the 1935 Alberta general election. He was defeated by Social Credit candidate Ronald Ansley finishing second in the four-way race.
