= Tofty, Alaska =

Tofty
- Ghost town
- Location within the state of Alaska
- Coordinates: 65°05′36″N 150°52′38″W
- Country: United States
- State: Alaska
- Census area: Yukon-Koyukuk

Government
  - State senator: Click Bishop (R)
  - State rep.: Dave Talerico (R)
- Time zone: UTC-9 (Alaska (AKST))
  - Summer (DST): UTC-8 (AKDT)

Tofty is a ghost town in the Yukon-Koyukuk Census Area in the U.S. state of Alaska. It was a gold-mining town known for its high production.

== Location ==
Tofty is located at approximately 65°6′31″N 150°31′55″W. It is about 15 miles west of Manley Hot Springs (25 miles by road), and approx. 91 miles West Northwest of Fairbanks, Alaska (175 miles by road). Tofty is located beyond the end of the Elliot Highway (Alaska Highway 2) and at the end of Tofty Road.

== Tofty Road ==
Tofty Road leaves the Elliot Highway to the North about 1/2 mile East of Manley Hot Springs. The State of Alaska has worked to maintain the road since the completion of the connecting Tanana Road. It is a one-lane dirt road with some recent improvements in the form of new culverts and the addition of gravel to areas that are very muddy during wet conditions. The road has a couple of fords over creeks that are not in culverts. The Tofty Road can be challenging in the spring and is plowed in winter but can be temporarily impassable due to snow or overflow.
