= Manley Hot Springs, Alaska =

Manley Hot Springs Too Naaleł Denh
- CDP
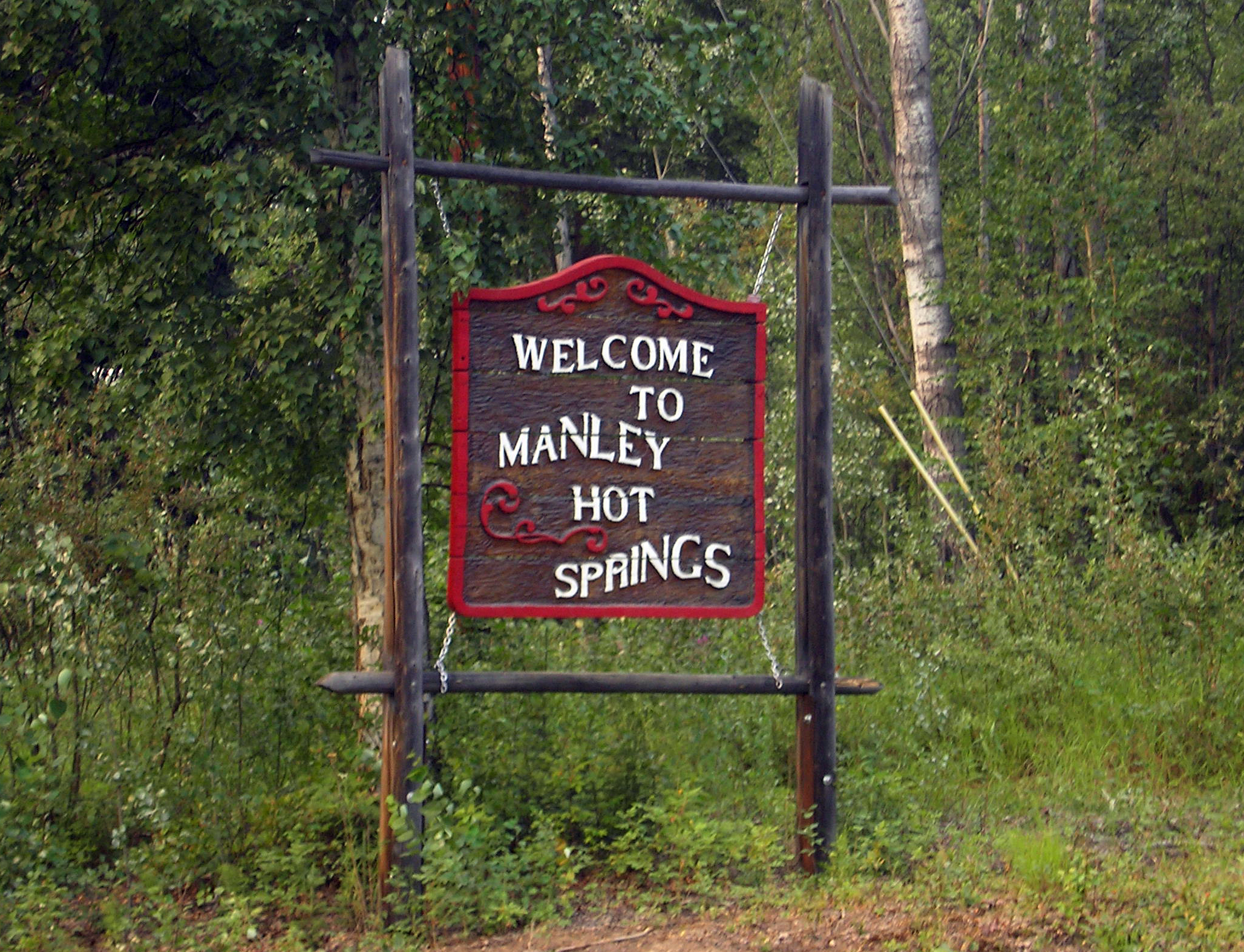
- Manley Hot Springs welcome sign

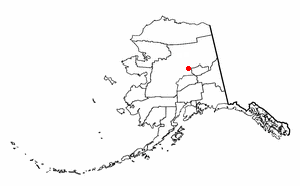
- Location of Manley Hot Springs, Alaska
- Coordinates: 65°0′28″N 150°37′36″W
- Country: United States
- State: Alaska
- Census Area: Yukon-Koyukuk

Government
  - State senator: Click Bishop (R)
  - State rep.: Mike Cronk (R)

Area
  - Total: 54.61 sq mi (141.44 km^{2})
  - Land: 54.61 sq mi (141.44 km^{2})
  - Water: 0 sq mi (0.00 km^{2})

Population (2020)
  - Total: 75
  - Density: 3.1/sq mi (1.19/km^{2})
- Time zone: UTC-9 (Alaska (AKST))
  - Summer (DST): UTC-8 (AKDT)
- ZIP code: 99756
- Area code: 907
- FIPS code: 02-46780

Manley Hot Springs (Koyukon: Too Naaleł Denh) is a census-designated place (CDP) in Yukon-Koyukuk Census Area, Alaska, United States. At the 2020 census the population was 169, up from 89 in 2010. By 2026, the New York Times reported that there were 75 year-round residents of Manley Hot Springs.

== Geography ==
Manley Hot Springs is located at 65°0′28″N 150°37′36″W (65.007773, -150.626732).

Manley Hot Springs is located about 8 km (5.0 mi) north of the Tanana River on Hot Springs Slough, at the end of the Elliott Highway, 260 km (160 mi) west of Fairbanks.

The CDP has a total area of 54.3 square miles (141 km^{2}) according to the United States Census Bureau. All of it is land.

== History ==
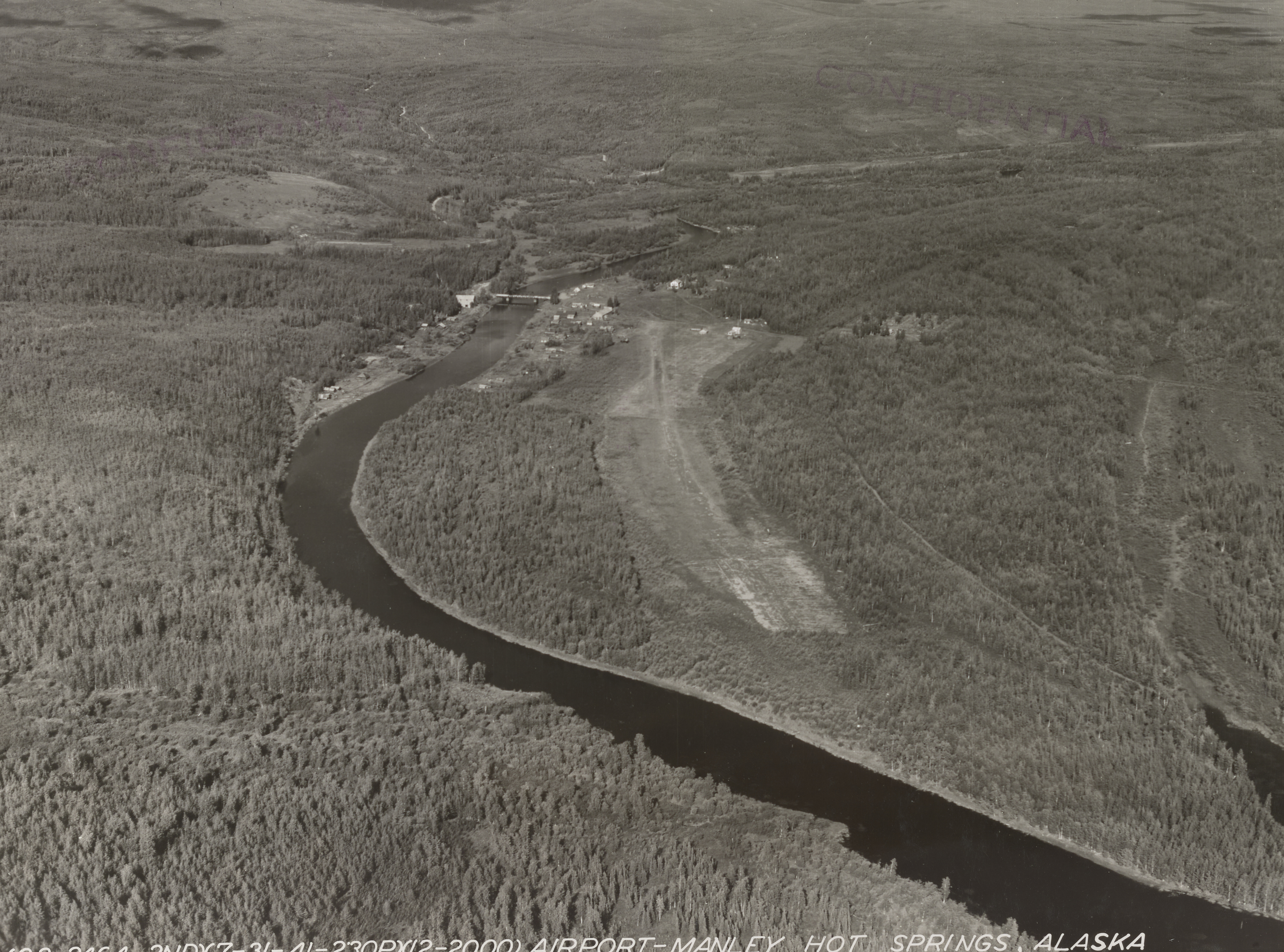
Manley Hot Springs in the 1930s

Traditional lands of the Cosna Band of the Upper Koyukon Dene.

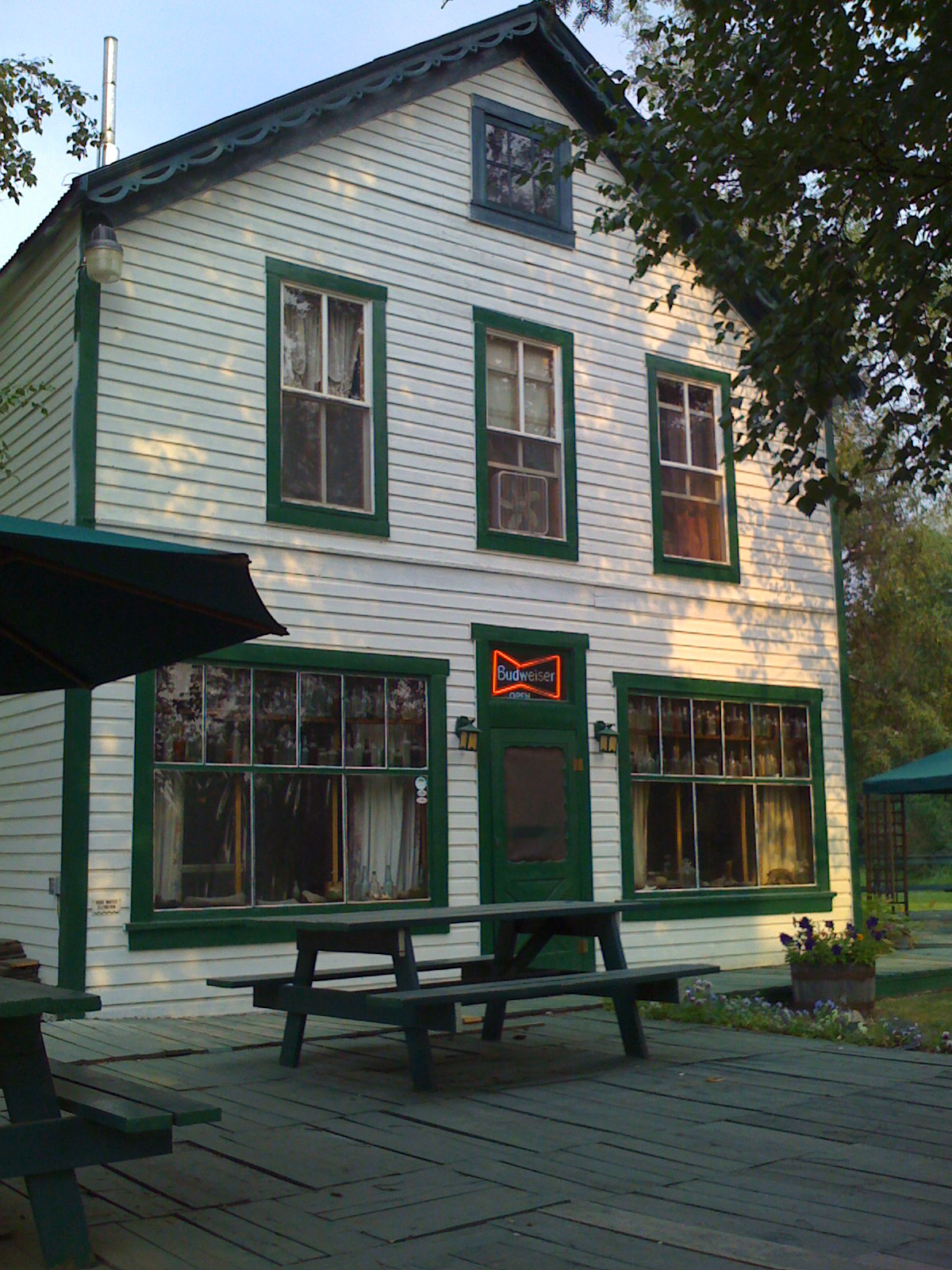
Manley Roadhouse was built in 1903 and still serves the community as its only restaurant and hotel.

In 1902 a prospector, John Karshner, discovered several hot springs in the area. He began a homestead and vegetable farm. In the same year, the United States Army built a telegraph station. The area became a service and supply point for miners in the Tofty and Eureka mining districts. It was known as Baker's Hot Springs, after nearby Baker Creek.

Farming and livestock operations in the area produced fresh meat, poultry, and produce for sale. In 1903, Sam's Rooms and Meals, now called the Manley Roadhouse, opened. The roadhouse was owned by Robert E. Lee, who was also the town's postmaster until his death in 2010. In 1907 a miner named Frank Manley built the Hot Springs Resort Hotel. The resort was a four-storey building with 45 guest rooms, steam heat, electric lights, hot baths, a bar, a restaurant, a billiard room, a bowling alley, a barber shop, and an Olympic-size indoor swimming pool which used heated water from the hot springs. During the summer, the hotel's private boat transported guests from steamers on the Tanana River. In the winter, an overland stagecoach trip from Fairbanks took two days. The town was renamed Hot Springs.

The resort and the mining in the area caused the town to prosper. It had a store, a newspaper, a bakery, clothing stores and other businesses. The population of the area in 1910 was more than 500. In 1913 the resort burned to the ground. Mining activity was also in decline and by 1920 only 29 residents lived in Hot Springs.

The town's name was changed to Manley Hot Springs in 1957.

Since 1950, the population of Manley Hot Springs has slowly increased. In the 2020 census, the population of Manley Hot Springs was 169, up 90 percent from 89 in 2010 census. In August, 2026, the New York Times reported that there were 75 year-round residents of Manley Hot Springs.

In May 2022, the second worst flood to hit the community caused power outages and the displacement of 60 people. No injuries occurred. The flooding was caused by an ice jam on the Tanana River, approximately 12 miles downriver from the community.

== 1984 spree killing ==
In May 1984, a newcomer to the town, Michael Silka, killed nine people in the area during the states deadliest spree killing since the Lane Hotel fire.

== Climate ==
Manley Hot Springs has a continental subarctic climate (Köppen Dfc) with cool, short summers and long, severely cold winters.

The record low temperature of −73 °F (−58 °C) was recorded in January 1989, while the record high temperature of 93 °F (34 °C) was recorded in June 1969.

Climate data for Manley Hot Springs 15NE, Alaska, 1991–2020 normals, 1909–2014 extremes: 501ft (153m)
Month	Jan	Feb	Mar	Apr	May	Jun	Jul	Aug	Sep	Oct	Nov	Dec	Year
Record high °F (°C)	47 (8)	46 (8)	64 (18)	72 (22)	89 (32)	93 (34)	92 (33)	89 (32)	84 (29)	60 (16)	49 (9)	51 (11)	93 (34)
Mean daily maximum °F (°C)	1.7 (−16.8)	12.4 (−10.9)	24.2 (−4.3)	42.5 (5.8)	60.6 (15.9)	72.6 (22.6)	72.3 (22.4)	65.8 (18.8)	53.5 (11.9)	32.9 (0.5)	10.9 (−11.7)	3.3 (−15.9)	37.7 (3.2)
Daily mean °F (°C)	−9.9 (−23.3)	−1.6 (−18.7)	6.6 (−14.1)	27.7 (−2.4)	45.4 (7.4)	56.5 (13.6)	59.2 (15.1)	53.3 (11.8)	41.1 (5.1)	23.4 (−4.8)	0.6 (−17.4)	−6.0 (−21.1)	24.7 (−4.1)
Mean daily minimum °F (°C)	−21.5 (−29.7)	−15.6 (−26.4)	−11.1 (−23.9)	12.9 (−10.6)	30.3 (−0.9)	40.4 (4.7)	46.0 (7.8)	40.8 (4.9)	28.6 (−1.9)	13.8 (−10.1)	−9.6 (−23.1)	−15.3 (−26.3)	11.6 (−11.3)
Record low °F (°C)	−73 (−58)	−64 (−53)	−59 (−51)	−37 (−38)	−11 (−24)	22 (−6)	15 (−9)	19 (−7)	−10 (−23)	−30 (−34)	−54 (−48)	−64 (−53)	−73 (−58)
Average precipitation inches (mm)	0.92 (23)	0.92 (23)	0.94 (24)	0.56 (14)	0.67 (17)	1.77 (45)	2.61 (66)	2.63 (67)	1.63 (41)	1.10 (28)	0.88 (22)	1.06 (27)	15.69 (397)
Average snowfall inches (cm)	9.7 (25)	7.5 (19)	7 (18)	3.3 (8.4)	0.4 (1.0)	0 (0)	0 (0)	0 (0)	0.6 (1.5)	6.9 (18)	10.8 (27)	11.3 (29)	57.4 (146)
Average precipitation days (≥ 0.01 in)	6	5	5	4	5	9	12	13	10	8	8	8	93
Source 1: NOAA (1981-2010 precipitation)
Source 2: WRCC (records, snowfall & precip days)

== Demographics ==
Historical population
Census	Pop.	Note	%±
1910	101		—
1920	29		−71.3%
1930	45		55.2%
1940	39		−13.3%
1950	29		−25.6%
1960	72		148.3%
1970	34		−52.8%
1980	61		79.4%
1990	96		57.4%
2000	72		−25.0%
2010	89		23.6%
2020	169		89.9%
U.S. Decennial Census

Manley Hot Springs first reported on the 1910 U.S. Census as "Hot Springs", an unincorporated village. It was formally changed to Manley Hot Springs in 1957. It became a census-designated place (CDP) in 1980.

At the 2000 census, there were 72 people, 36 households and 19 families residing in the CDP. The population density was 1.3 per square mile (0.50/km^{2}). There were 105 housing units at an average density of 1.9 per square mile (0.73/km^{2}). The racial make-up of the CDP was 73.61% White, 23.61% Native American and 2.78% from other races.

There were 36 households, of which 19.4% had children under the age of 18 living with them, 47.2% were married couples living together, 5.6% had a female householder with no husband present and 47.2% were non-families. 38.9% of all households were made up of individuals, and 2.8% had someone living alone who was 65 years of age or older. The average household size was 2.00 and the average family size was 2.58.

15.3% of the population were under the age of 18, 4.2% from 18 to 24, 30.6% from 25 to 44, 37.5% from 45 to 64, and 12.5% were 65 years of age or older. The median age was 44 years. For every 100 females, there were 125.0 males. For every 100 females age 18 and over, there were 110.3 males.

In August 2026, the New York Times reported that the median age in Manley Hot Springs was 75 years of age.

The median household income was $29,000 and the median family income was $59,583. Males had a median income of $36,250 and females $16,250. The per capita income was $21,751. There were no families and 9.7% of the population living below the poverty line, including no under eighteens and none of those over 64.

== Education ==
The Yukon–Koyukuk School District formerly operated the Gladys Dart School in Manley Hot Springs. It closed in 2019 due to a lack of enrollment. The village council acquired the school property from the school district in February 2021.

== Transportation ==
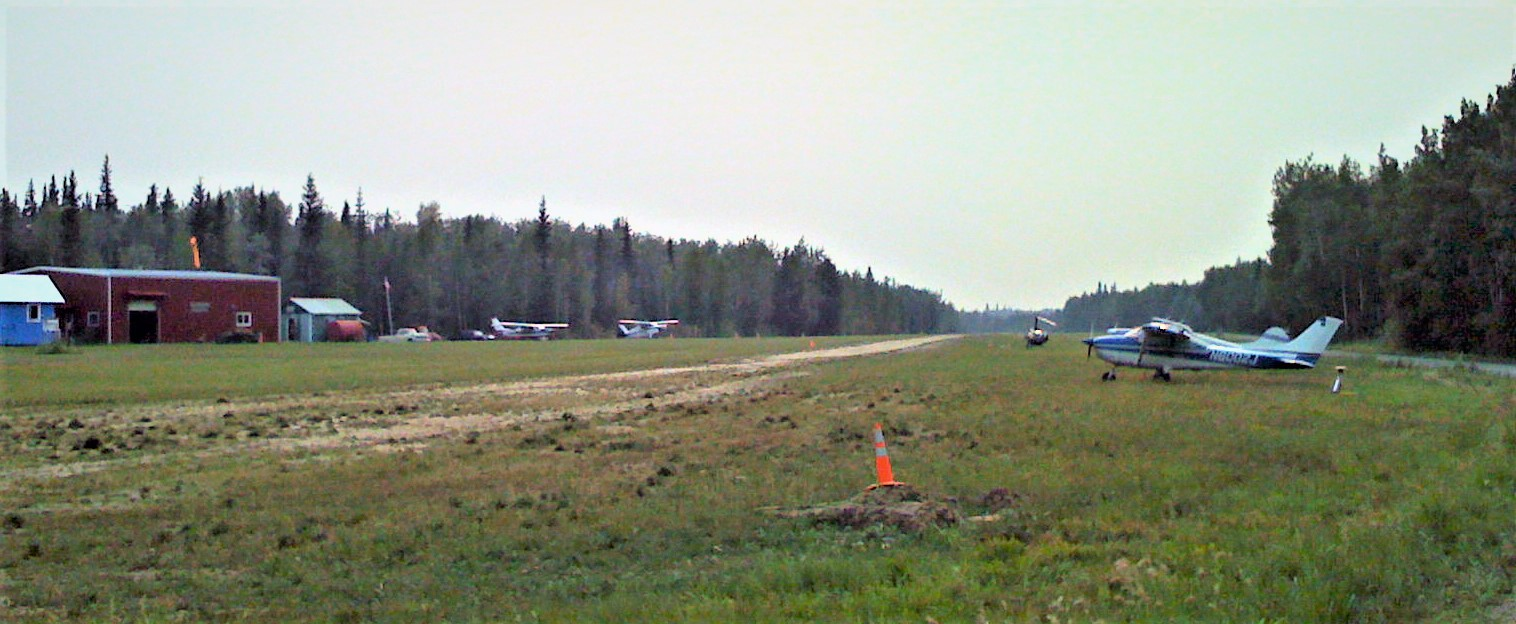
Manley Hot Springs Airport is supported by the Essential Air Service program.

The Elliott Highway (Alaska Route 2), completed in 1959, gives Manley Hot Springs road access from Fairbanks year-round. Before 1982 it was not plowed by the state and closed during the winter.

The Manley Hot Springs Airport has scheduled flights to Fairbanks International Airport operated by Warbelow's Air Ventures.

== See also ==
- List of hot springs in the United States § Alaska
