= Wetaskiwin-Leduc =

Defunct provincial electoral district in Alberta, Canada

Alberta electoral district

Defunct provincial electoral district
- Legislature: Legislative Assembly of Alberta
- District created: 1971
- District abolished: 1993
- First contested: 1971
- Last contested: 1989

Wetaskiwin-Leduc was a provincial electoral district in Alberta, Canada, mandated to return a single member to the Legislative Assembly of Alberta using the first past the post method of voting from 1971 to 1993.

== History ==
Wetaskiwin-Leduc was formed from the abolished Clover Bar, Strathcona South, Wetaskiwin, and Leduc electoral districts prior to the 1971 Alberta general election; the latter two districts had existed continuously since 1905. Wetaskiwin-Leduc was abolished prior to the 1993 Alberta general election and its area formed parts of the Wetaskiwin-Camrose and Leduc electoral districts.

Wetaskiwin-Leduc is named for the cities of Wetaskiwin, Alberta and Leduc, Alberta.

=== Members of the Legislative Assembly (MLAs) ===
Members of the Legislative Assembly for Wetaskiwin-Leduc
Assembly	Years	Member	Party
See Wetaskiwin electoral district from 1905-1971, Leduc electoral district from 1905-1971, Clover Bar and Strathcona South
17th	1971–1975	James Douglas Henderson	Social Credit
18th	1975–1979	Dallas Schmidt	Progressive Conservative
19th	1979–1982	Dallas Schmidt	Progressive Conservative
20th	1982–1986	Donald H. Sparrow	Progressive Conservative
21st	1986–1989	Donald H. Sparrow	Progressive Conservative
22nd	1989–1993	Donald H. Sparrow	Progressive Conservative
See Wetaskiwin-Camrose electoral district from 1993-2019 and Leduc electoral district from 1993-2004

== Electoral history ==
=== 1971 ===
1971 Alberta general election
Party	Candidate	Votes	%	±%
Social Credit	James Douglas Henderson	5,334	47.37%	–
Progressive Conservative	Emanuel Pyrcz	4,590	40.76%	–
New Democratic	Lionel Udenberg	1,336	11.87%	–
Total		11,260	–	–
Rejected, spoiled and declined		29	–	–
Eligible electors / turnout		16,167	69.83%	–
Social Credit pickup new district.				
Source(s) Source: "Wetaskiwin-Leduc Official Results 1971 Alberta general election". Alberta Heritage Community Foundation.

=== 1975 ===
1975 Alberta general election
Party	Candidate	Votes	%	±%
Progressive Conservative	Dallas Schmidt	7,544	63.91%	23.15%
Social Credit	Waldo Siemens	2,076	17.59%	-29.78%
New Democratic	Earl Rasmuson	1,662	14.08%	2.21%
Liberal	Pat Green	522	4.42%	–
Total		11,804	–	–
Rejected, spoiled and declined		28	–	–
Eligible electors / turnout		20,690	57.19%	–
Progressive Conservative gain from Social Credit		Swing		19.86%
Source(s) Source: "Wetaskiwin-Leduc Official Results 1975 Alberta general election". Alberta Heritage Community Foundation.

=== 1979 ===
1979 Alberta general election
Party	Candidate	Votes	%	±%
Progressive Conservative	Dallas Schmidt	8,216	58.82%	-5.09%
Social Credit	Reinhold Ortlieb	2,702	19.35%	1.76%
New Democratic	Earl Rasmuson	2,372	16.98%	2.90%
Liberal	Brian King	677	4.85%	0.42%
Total		13,967	–	–
Rejected, spoiled and declined		N/A	–	–
Eligible electors / turnout		23,929	58.37%	–
Progressive Conservative hold		Swing		-3.42%
Source(s) Source: "Wetaskiwin-Leduc Official Results 1979 Alberta general election". Alberta Heritage Community Foundation.

=== 1982 ===
1982 Alberta general election
Party	Candidate	Votes	%	±%
Progressive Conservative	Donald H. Sparrow	12,923	63.98%	5.15%
Western Canada Concept	Bill Hosford	3,511	17.38%	–
New Democratic	Earl R. Rasmuson	3,190	15.79%	-1.19%
Independent	Barry Cook	576	2.85%	–
Total		20,200	–	–
Rejected, spoiled and declined		69	–	–
Eligible electors / turnout		28,622	70.82%	–
Progressive Conservative hold		Swing		3.56%
Source(s) Source: "Wetaskiwin-Leduc Official Results 1982 Alberta general election". Alberta Heritage Community Foundation.

=== 1986 ===
1986 Alberta general election
Party	Candidate	Votes	%	±%
Progressive Conservative	Donald H. Sparrow	5,823	55.72%	-8.25%
New Democratic	M. (Dick) Devries	3,061	29.29%	13.50%
Liberal	Kathleen Crone	740	7.08%	–
Representative	Harold L. Schneider	488	4.67%	–
Western Canada Concept	W.L. (Bud) Iverson	208	1.99%	-15.39%
Independent	John Tolsma	130	1.24%	-1.61%
Total		10,450	–	–
Rejected, spoiled and declined		28	–	–
Eligible electors / turnout		21,768	48.13%	–
Progressive Conservative hold		Swing		-10.08%
Source(s) Source: "Wetaskiwin-Leduc Official Results 1986 Alberta general election". Alberta Heritage Community Foundation.

=== 1989 ===
1989 Alberta general election
Party	Candidate	Votes	%	±%
Progressive Conservative	Donald H. Sparrow	5,761	46.69%	-9.04%
Liberal	George Carrier	3,446	27.93%	20.84%
New Democratic	Bruce Hinkley	3,133	25.39%	-3.90%
Total		12,340	–	–
Rejected, spoiled and declined		26	–	–
Eligible electors / turnout		22,768	54.31%	–
Progressive Conservative hold		Swing		-3.84%
Source(s) Source: "Wetaskiwin-Leduc Official Results 1989 Alberta general election". Alberta Heritage Community Foundation.

== See also ==
- List of Alberta provincial electoral districts
- Canadian provincial electoral districts
