= Ronald Ansley =

Canadian politician (1908–1965)

Ronald Earl Ansley
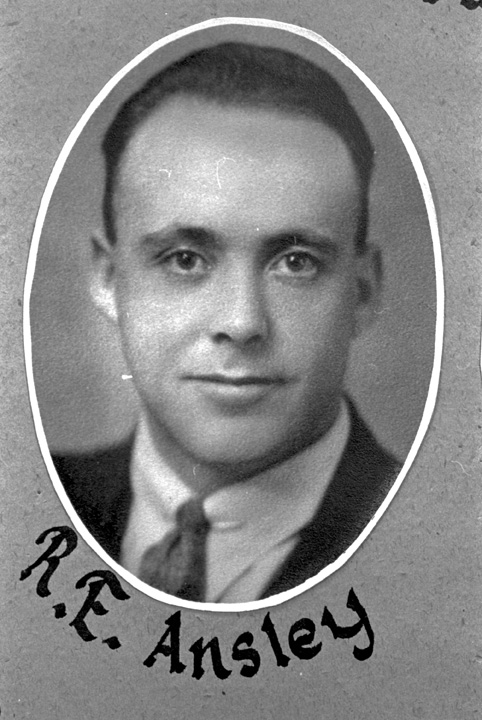

Member of the Legislative Assembly of Alberta
- In office August 22, 1935 – June 17, 1963
- Preceded by: Arthur Mitchell
- Succeeded by: James Henderson
- Constituency: Leduc

Minister of Education
- In office September 12, 1944 – February 23, 1948
- Premier: Ernest Manning
- Preceded by: Solon Low
- Succeeded by: Ivan Casey

Personal details
- Born: March 20, 1908 Killam, Alberta
- Died: December 6, 1965 (aged 57) Canmore, Alberta
- Party: Social Credit
- Other political affiliations: Independent Social Credit
- Occupation: politician

Ronald Earl Ansley (March 20, 1908 – December 6, 1965) was a provincial politician from Alberta, Canada. He served as a member of the Legislative Assembly of Alberta from 1935 to 1963 sitting with the Social Credit caucus in government and as an Independent.

== Political career ==
Ansley ran for a seat to the Alberta Legislature as a Social Credit candidate in the electoral district of Leduc in the 1935 Alberta general election. He defeated incumbent Arthur Mitchell and two other candidates by a wide majority to pick up the seat for his party.

Ansley ran for re-election in the 1940 Alberta general election. He faced two other challenging candidates. Despite losing some of his popular vote from the 1935 election Ansley easily held his seat.

The 1944 Alberta general election saw Ansley run for a third term in office. He won a larger majority to easily hold his seat in the three way race. After the election Premier Ernest Manning appointed Ansley to the Executive Council of Alberta on September 12, 1944 as Minister of Education in the ensuing cabinet shuffle. He held that post until February 23, 1948 when he resigned.

Ansley despite becoming increasingly unhappy with the Social Credit government over implementation of Douglas Monetary Reforms ran for re-election in the 1948 Alberta general election. He was returned to office for his fourth term easily defeating the two other candidates.

Shortly after the election the Social Credit voted to exclude Albert Bourcier from the Social Credit caucus and expelled some other Douglasite Social Creditors from the party through a motion passed at the 1948 Social Credit AGM. Ansley who was a member of the group was not expelled and openly opposed the expulsions.

The Social Credit League formally asked the government in 1949 to expel all members of caucus including Ansley who held membership in the Douglas Social Credit Council.

In 1951 he openly led a revolt that defeated the Mineral Taxation Act 29 to 15 in a recorded division on third reading. He was expelled from caucus on June 16, 1952 after attending a nomination convention asking Bourcier to run as an Independent Social Credit candidate.

The Leduc Social Credit Constituency Association nominated Ansley as their candidate with a clause in the motion to endorse stating that he would be supported regardless of what banner he runs under. After being unable to run as a straight Social Credit candidate, Ansley stood for re-election as an Independent Social Credit candidate. He won a hotly contested race on the second ballot defeating two other candidates to return to his fifth term in office.

Ansley ran for a sixth term in office in the 1955 Alberta general election. The race five way race was very closely contested. Ansely ended up holding on to his seat by winning in the fourth vote count.

Ansley ran for a seventh term in the 1959 Alberta general election. He held his seat easily defeating two other candidates as no official Social Credit candidate ran against him.

Ansley ran for an eighth term in office in the 1963 Alberta general election. He was defeated by Social Credit candidate James Douglas Henderson finishing a distant third place in a field of six candidates.
