= Robert Telford =

Canadian politician

Robert Taylor Telford
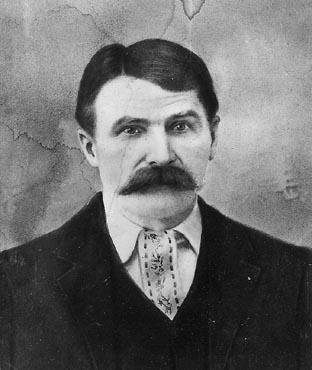

Member of the Legislative Assembly of Alberta
- In office November 9, 1905 – April 17, 1913
- Preceded by: New district
- Succeeded by: Stanley Tobin
- Constituency: Leduc

Personal details
- Born: June 19, 1860 Shawville, Canada East
- Died: November 26, 1933 (aged 73) Leduc, Alberta, Canada
- Party: Liberal
- Spouse: Belle Howard
- Children: Two sons, Raymond and Lome
- Occupation: Police officer, lumberman, businessman, justice of the peace

Robert Taylor Telford (July 19, 1860 – November 26, 1933) was a Canadian pioneer, businessman, and politician who served in the Legislative Assembly of Alberta from 1905 until 1913. Born in Quebec, he moved to western Canada for adventure, and served with the North-West Mounted Police during the North-West Rebellion of 1885.

He settled near Leduc, Alberta, where he built the largest house in the region. After marrying and starting a family, he became a prominent local businessman, operating a hotel, general store and lumberyard before being elected as a Liberal in the 1905 election. He served two terms before retiring, and later was elected and served one year as mayor of Leduc. He and his wife had adopted two sons: the eldest, Raymond Telford was killed in action in 1916 during World War I.

== Early life ==
Telford was born June 19, 1860, in Shawville, Canada East, to Irish Canadian parents, Robert and Anne (Pratt) Telford. He was educated at public schools in Quebec. In 1880 he went to the United States, but returned to Canada in 1885 in search of adventure after reading an article about the North-West Rebellion of 1885.

He went to Calgary and worked as a carpenter until July 1885, when he joined the North-West Mounted Police. In 1889 he homesteaded near what is now Leduc, on the shores of what was then called Leduc Lake. That July he built a house, then the largest building between Calgary and Edmonton; he operated it as a "stopping house", or hotel, with rooms and board available for travelers, in addition to those for his future family.

In the spring of 1890 Telford married Wisconsin native Sarah Isabelle "Belle" Howard in Wisconsin. She accompanied him to Leduc shortly afterward. Robert and Belle Telford adopted two sons, Raymond and Lorne. Raymond was killed in June 1916, while serving with the 51st Battalion in World War I.

People in small frontier towns often had several businesses. Besides his stopping house, which he moved closer to the railway station when the railway reached Leduc, the senior Telford operated a general store and later a lumberyard. He ran the latter for twenty-five years before selling it in 1919. He served as a postmaster from 1894 until 1905, and was appointed as Leduc's justice of the peace in January 1897. He was also active with the Masons.

== Political career ==
Telford ran as the Liberal candidate in Leduc in the 1905 provincial election, the first provincial election for Alberta. He handily defeated his Conservative opponent. He was returned to office without opposition in the 1909 election, and was defeated during the nomination process by Stanley Tobin in his bid for re-election in 1913. In the legislature, he supported the government of Premier Alexander Cameron Rutherford against a group of dissident Liberals in the Alberta and Great Waterways Railway scandal. The Calgary Herald alleged that he had accepted a bribe of Can$500 to do so, prompting Telford to sue for libel. After Rutherford was replaced as premier by Arthur Sifton, Sifton's cabinet, though Liberal, followed an opposite course to Rutherford's on the development of railways, the issue that had brought down Rutherford's government. Telford supported Sifton's government, notwithstanding its policy differences with the old.

Telford was also involved in local politics: he served on the Leduc town council for several years and as mayor from 1915 to 1916. As at 1924, he also served on the school board.

== Later life and legacy ==
After selling his lumberyard in 1919, Telford entered a state of near-retirement, though he continued to derive significant income from real estate holdings in the Leduc area. He died in 1933 at the age of 73.

Leduc Lake was renamed Telford Lake in his honour, and the hamlet of Telfordville also bears his name.

== Electoral record ==
=== 1905 general election ===
1905 Alberta general election: Leduc
Party	Candidate	Votes	%	±%
Liberal	Robert Telford	481	63.46%	–
Conservative	C. E. A. Simonds	277	36.54%	–
Total		758	–	–
Rejected, spoiled and declined		N/A	–	–
Eligible electors / turnout		758	N/A	–
Liberal pickup new district.				
Source(s) Source: "Leduc Official Results 1905 Alberta general election". Alberta Heritage Community Foundation.

=== 1909 general election ===
1909 Alberta general election: Leduc
Party	Candidate	Votes	%	±%
Liberal	Robert Telford	Acclaimed	–	–
Total		N/A	–	–
Rejected, spoiled and declined		N/A	–	–
Eligible electors / turnout		N/A	N/A	–
Liberal hold		Swing		N/A
Source(s) Source: "Leduc Official Results 1909 Alberta general election". Alberta Heritage Community Foundation.
