= Breton, Alberta =

Breton
- Village
- Village of Breton
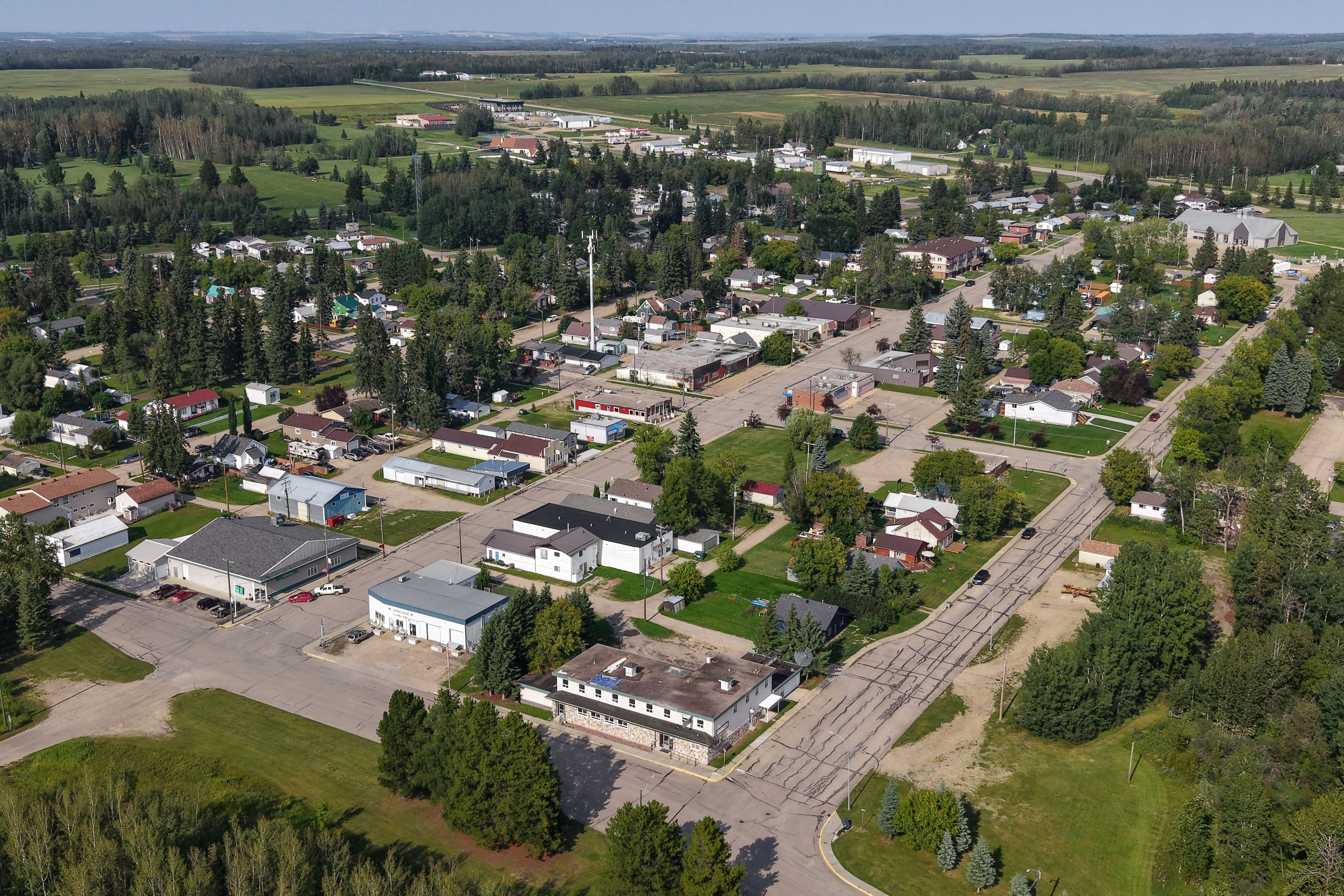
- Aerial view (2026)

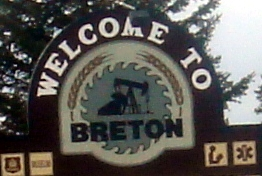
- Coat of arms

- Location in Brazeau County

- Location in Alberta
- Coordinates: 53°06′18.0″N 114°28′25.1″W
- Country: Canada
- Province: Alberta
- Region: Central Alberta
- Census division: 11
- Municipal District: Brazeau County
- Incorporated
  - Village: January 1, 1957

Government
  - Mayor: James Alan Barker
  - Governing body: Breton Village Council

Area (2021)
  - Land: 1.72 km^{2} (0.66 sq mi)

Population (2021)
  - Total: 567
  - Density: 329.9/km^{2} (854/sq mi)
- Time zone: UTC−06:00 (Alberta Time)
- Postal code span: T0C 0P0
- Highways: Highway 20; Highway 616
- Website: www.breton.ca

Breton /ˈbrɛtən/ is a village in central Alberta, Canada. It is located roughly 95 kilometres (59 mi) southwest of Edmonton.

== History ==
Originally called Keystone, it was established in 1909 by a group of African-American immigrants as a block settlement. The new Black Canadian homesteaders arrived from Oklahoma, Kansas, and Texas, just four years after Alberta became a province in 1905.

A Canadian Northern Railway line was built through Breton. Breton had several grain elevators and a station.

In 1927 the town was renamed after United Farmers MLA Douglas Breton, shortly after his election as the region's Member of the Alberta Legislature.

== Infrastructure ==
It has one High School (grades 7–12) and one elementary (K-6) school. It has a Paid-on-Call fire department operating with the Brazeau county fire services, one grocery store, one golf course, two restaurants, one hair parlour, and a police station with three officers and one secretary.

== Demographics ==
In the 2021 Census of Population conducted by Statistics Canada, the Village of Breton had a population of 567 living in 259 of its 296 total private dwellings, a change of −1.2% from its 2016 population of 574. With a land area of 1.72 km^{2} (0.66 sq mi), it had a population density of 329.7/km^{2} (853.8/sq mi) in 2021.

In the 2016 Census of Population conducted by Statistics Canada, the Village of Breton recorded a population of 574 living in 252 of its 292 total private dwellings, a 15.7% change from its 2011 population of 496. With a land area of 1.72 km^{2} (0.66 sq mi), it had a population density of 333.7/km^{2} (864.3/sq mi) in 2016.

The Village of Breton's 2012 municipal census counted a population of 581, a 0.3% increase over its 2007 municipal census population of 579.

Climate data for Breton, Alberta (1991–2020 normals, extremes 1974–present)
Month	Jan	Feb	Mar	Apr	May	Jun	Jul	Aug	Sep	Oct	Nov	Dec	Year
Record high °C (°F)	18.0 (64.4)	16.5 (61.7)	22.5 (72.5)	28.9 (84.0)	31.5 (88.7)	34.0 (93.2)	34.5 (94.1)	35.0 (95.0)	33.5 (92.3)	28.0 (82.4)	19.5 (67.1)	15.5 (59.9)	35.0 (95.0)
Mean daily maximum °C (°F)	−4.3 (24.3)	−1.3 (29.7)	2.4 (36.3)	10.3 (50.5)	16.7 (62.1)	20.1 (68.2)	23.1 (73.6)	22.1 (71.8)	17.8 (64.0)	10.1 (50.2)	1.4 (34.5)	−3.6 (25.5)	9.6 (49.2)
Daily mean °C (°F)	−9.8 (14.4)	−7.1 (19.2)	−3.4 (25.9)	4.3 (39.7)	10.0 (50.0)	14.0 (57.2)	16.7 (62.1)	15.6 (60.1)	11.1 (52.0)	4.3 (39.7)	−3.7 (25.3)	−8.5 (16.7)	3.6 (38.5)
Mean daily minimum °C (°F)	−15.2 (4.6)	−12.8 (9.0)	−9.2 (15.4)	−2.0 (28.4)	3.4 (38.1)	7.8 (46.0)	10.2 (50.4)	9.1 (48.4)	4.5 (40.1)	−1.5 (29.3)	−8.4 (16.9)	−14.0 (6.8)	−2.3 (27.8)
Record low °C (°F)	−40.5 (−40.9)	−39.5 (−39.1)	−37.2 (−35.0)	−23.9 (−11.0)	−10.0 (14.0)	−1.0 (30.2)	1.0 (33.8)	−2.0 (28.4)	−6.7 (19.9)	−23.5 (−10.3)	−34.0 (−29.2)	−38.0 (−36.4)	−40.5 (−40.9)
Average precipitation mm (inches)	20.3 (0.80)	14.7 (0.58)	17.8 (0.70)	29.4 (1.16)	60.3 (2.37)	85.5 (3.37)	102.1 (4.02)	68.9 (2.71)	41.9 (1.65)	22.0 (0.87)	23.2 (0.91)	12.6 (0.50)	498.7 (19.64)
Average rainfall mm (inches)	0.5 (0.02)	0.8 (0.03)	1.2 (0.05)	17.5 (0.69)	55.0 (2.17)	85.5 (3.37)	102.1 (4.02)	68.8 (2.71)	40.4 (1.59)	12.4 (0.49)	1.8 (0.07)	0.2 (0.01)	386.2 (15.22)
Average snowfall cm (inches)	31.5 (12.4)	17.8 (7.0)	25.1 (9.9)	17.3 (6.8)	5.9 (2.3)	0.0 (0.0)	0.0 (0.0)	0.1 (0.0)	2.0 (0.8)	11.7 (4.6)	30.2 (11.9)	24.2 (9.5)	165.8 (65.2)
Average precipitation days (≥ 0.2 mm)	6.1	5.1	5.0	5.9	10.3	15.1	15.6	13.6	9.9	6.7	6.4	4.6	104.3
Average rainy days (≥ 0.2 mm)	0.13	0.04	0.38	3.8	9.6	15.1	15.6	13.5	9.6	4.5	0.48	0.1	72.83
Average snowy days (≥ 0.2 cm)	8.6	6.2	6.4	3.4	1.1	0.0	0.0	0.04	0.59	3.0	7.6	7.0	43.93
Source: Environment Canada

== See also ==
- List of communities in Alberta
- List of villages in Alberta
- Similar 1908 to 1910 Alberta homesteader settlements of Black Canadians:
  - Amber Valley, Alberta
  - Campsie, Alberta
  - Junkins (now Wildwood), Alberta
