= Elliott Highway =

Highway in Alaska

Elliott Highway
- Elliott Highway highlighted in red

Route information
- Maintained by Alaska DOT&PF
- Length: 152 mi (245 km)

Major junctions
- West end: Manley Hot Springs Road in Manley Hot Springs
- AK-11 (Dalton Highway) in Livengood
- East end: AK-2 / AK-6 (Steese Highway) in Fox

Location
- Country: United States
- State: Alaska

Highway system
- Alaska Routes; Interstate; Scenic Byways

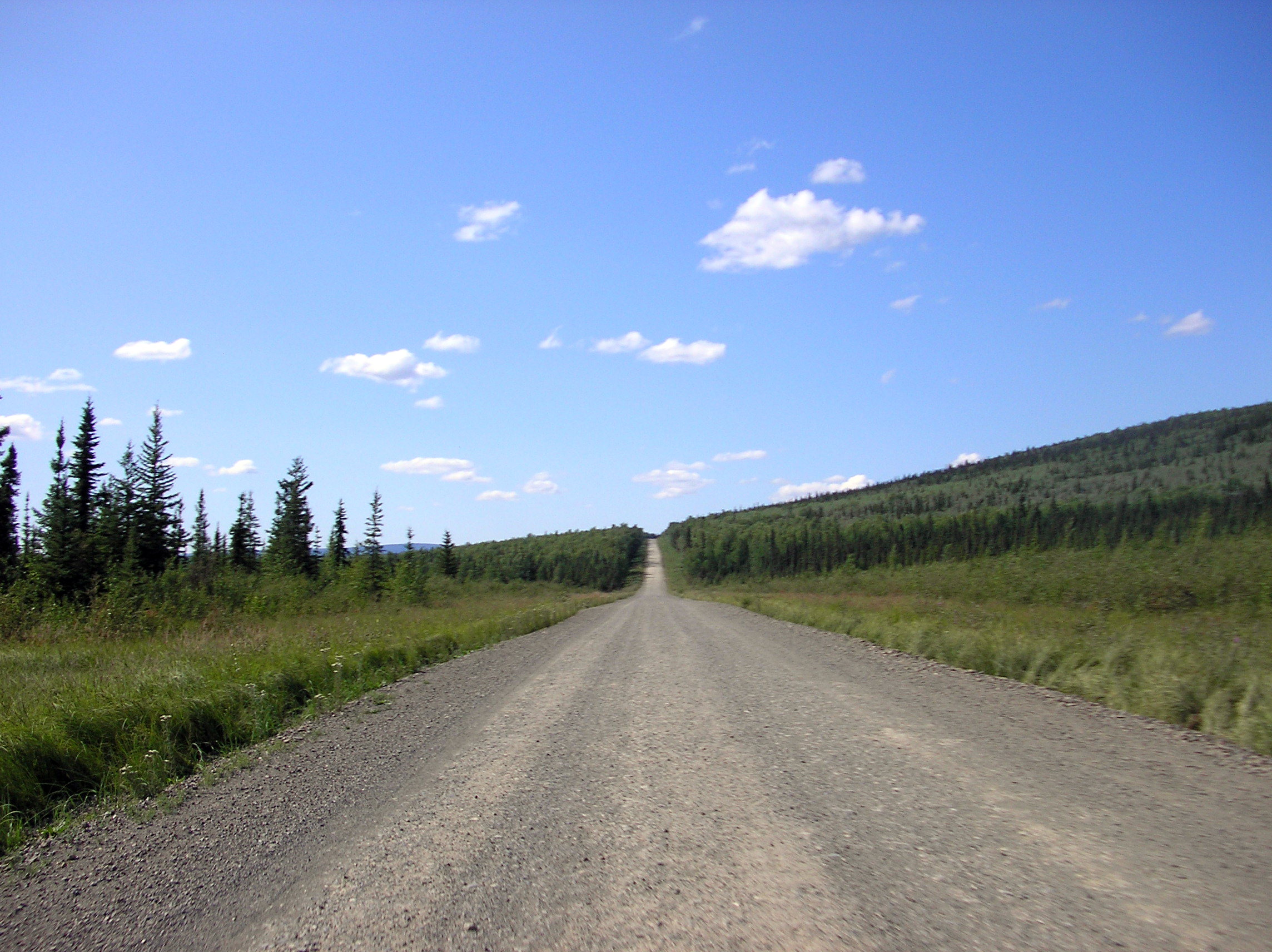
Elliot Highway

The Elliott Highway is a highway in the U.S. state of Alaska that extends 152 miles (245 km) from Fox, about 10 miles (16 km) north of Fairbanks, to Manley Hot Springs. It was completed in 1959 and is part of Alaska Route 2.

== Route description ==
The highway is paved and in generally good condition year-round between Fairbanks and the junction with the Dalton Highway, but reverts to an unpaved road for the final 80 miles (130 km) to Manley Hot Springs. This portion of the road, particularly in winter, can be very challenging to navigate due to overflow of ice and water on the road, high-wind areas, and drifting snow. There is no cellular telephone service available on the Elliott Highway north of Wickersham Dome, though there is fuel available in Minto, and traffic, particularly past the Dalton Highway cutoff, can be extremely sparse.

Travelers are advised to check road conditions before traveling this road through the state transportation hotline, and to carry emergency supplies and fuel enough for 400 miles (640 km).

Near Manley Hot Springs there is a 50-mile side road to Tanana over Tofty. This road was built 2014-2016 for a cost of $13 million. The road ends on the south side of the Yukon River, so a boat trip or an ice road is also needed to reach Tanana.

Minto is also served by a side road off the main highway called the Minto Road. The Dalton Highway begins 73 miles (118 km) north of Fox at its junction with the Elliott Highway.

== Future ==
A 500-mile (800 km) road project (Manley Hot Springs–Nome) is being discussed in Alaska. It has been estimated (in 2010) to cost $2.3–2.7 billion, or approximately $5 million per mile.

The road to Nome has received hesitation because of the cost. Former governor Sean Parnell wanted, as a beginning, to build a road from Manley Hot Springs to Tanana, around 35 miles length, and the road to Tanana was opened in 2016, ending at the Yukon River. The last 12 miles is private property, and belongs to the village corporation Tozitna Limited. The parking lot by the river is for residents, shareholders and tribal members only. During winters an ice road is made on the river ice, enabling road access for a few months; weather depending. Any continuation would require a fairly expensive bridge to be built. A ferry is an option also, but then the river would be impassable when the ice is too weak for driving but too thick for a ferry.

== See also ==
- List of Alaska Routes

== Junction list ==
See the article on Alaska Route 2 for an updated major intersections list.
