= Telford Lake =

- Location within Alberta Location within Canada
- Location: Leduc, Alberta
- Coordinates: 53.266°N 113.522°W
- Type: lake

Telford Lake is a lake in Leduc, Alberta, Canada.It is home to boat races and many other events.

== History ==
Around 1890, Robert Telford, a politician from Quebec, bought a plot of land near the lake. The lake was later named for him.

== Wildlife ==
There are many species of wildlife in the Telford Lake riverbanks. Conservation projects are numerous in Telford Lake.
