= Donald H. Sparrow =

Canadian politician

Donald Hugh Sparrow

Member of the Legislative Assembly of Alberta for Wetaskiwin-Leduc
- In office 1982–1993
- Preceded by: Dallas Schmidt
- Succeeded by: District Abolished

Personal details
- Born: November 21, 1935 Conjuring Creek, Alberta, Canada
- Died: July 10, 1993 (aged 57) County of Wetaskiwin No. 10, Alberta, Canada
- Party: Progressive Conservative
- Spouse: Lucille Halwa (m. 1958)
- Children: 5

Donald Hugh Sparrow (November 21, 1935 – July 10, 1993) was a politician from Alberta, Canada. He served as a member of the Legislative Assembly of Alberta from 1982 to 1993.

== Political career ==
Sparrow ran for a seat as a Progressive Conservative candidate in the 1982 Alberta general election. He won the Wetaskiwin-Leduc electoral district with a super majority, defeating three other candidates and winning with a 9000 vote plurality over second place candidate Bill Hosford from the Western Canada Concept. He was re-elected with a substantially smaller majority in the 1986 Alberta general election. Sparrow lost 7,100 votes from his 1982 total, the field of five candidates turned into a two-way race between New Democratic candidate Dick Devries and Sparrow. On election night Sparrow hung on to his district winning a 2000 vote plurality over Devries. Sparrow ran for his third and final term in the 1989 Alberta general election. His margin of victory shrank as he won a hotly contested three-way election. He retired from public office at dissolution of the Assembly in 1993 and died a few weeks later in an automobile accident near Alberta Highway 2 and Alberta Highway 13.

Legislative Assembly of Alberta
Preceded by Dallas Schmidt	MLA Wetaskiwin-Leduc; 1982-1993	Succeeded by District Abolished
