= Manley Hot Springs Airport =

Airport in Alaska, United States

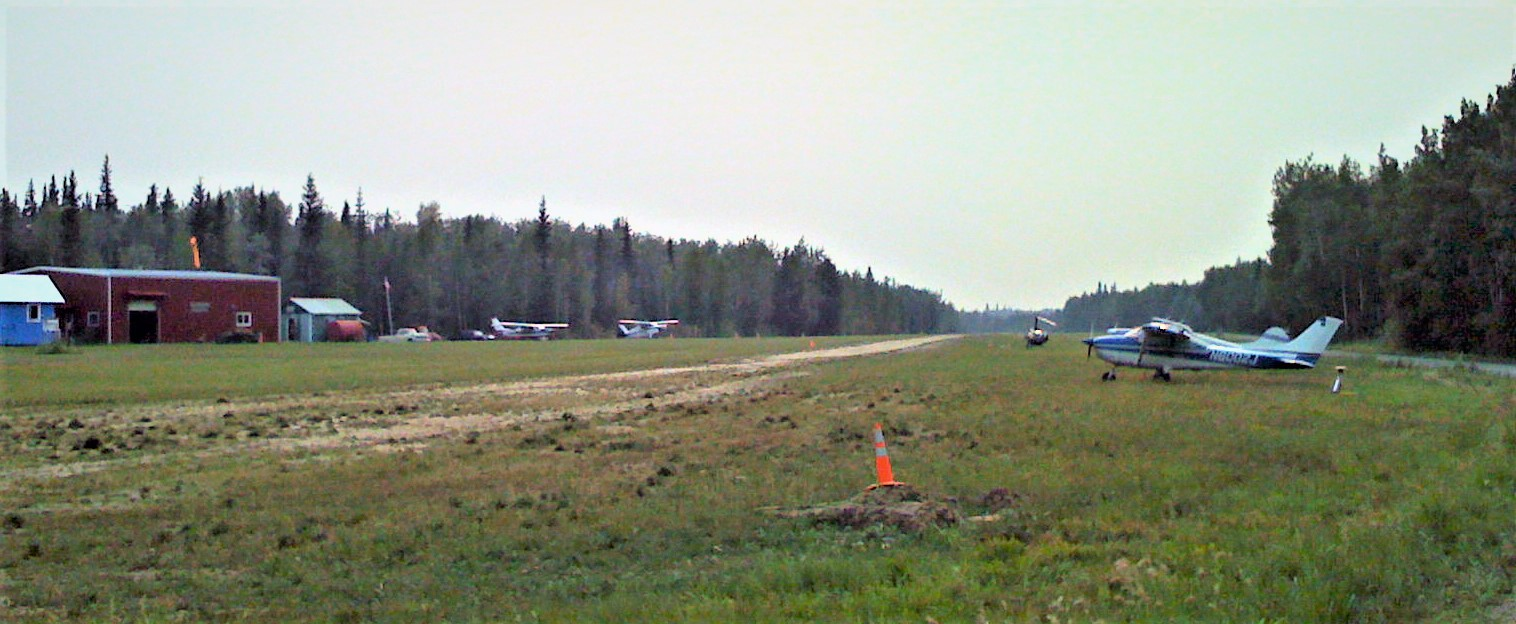
- Manley Hot Springs Airport, July 2009
- IATA: MLY; ICAO: PAML; FAA LID: MLY

Summary
- Airport type: Public
- Owner: State of Alaska DOT&PF
- Serves: Manley Hot Springs, Alaska
- Elevation AMSL: 270 ft (82 m)
- Coordinates: 64°59′51″N 150°38′39″W

Map
- Location of airport in Alaska

Runways
Direction	Length		Surface
Direction	ft	m	Surface
18/36	3,400	1,036	Gravel

Statistics (2019)
- Aircraft operations: 1,700
- Based aircraft: 5
- Source: Federal Aviation Administration

Manley Hot Springs Airport (IATA: MLY, ICAO: PAML, FAA LID: MLY) is a state owned, public use airport located in Manley Hot Springs, in the Yukon-Koyukuk Census Area of the U.S. state of Alaska. Scheduled passenger service at this airport is subsidized by the U.S. Department of Transportation via the Essential Air Service program.

As per Federal Aviation Administration records, the airport had 101 passenger boardings (enplanements) in calendar year 2017, 73 enplanements in 2018, and 114 in 2019. It is included in the National Plan of Integrated Airport Systems for 2021–2025, which categorized it as a general aviation airport.

== Facilities and aircraft ==
Manley Hot Springs Airport has one runway designated 18/36 with a gravel surface measuring 3,400 by 60 feet (1,036 x 18 m). For the 12-month period ending December 31, 2019, the airport had 1,700 aircraft operations, an average of 141 per month: 71% general aviation and 29% air taxi.

Runway 18/36 opened in August 2013; the previous runway is closed to takeoffs and landings. The previous runway was designated 2/20, with a turf and dirt surface measuring 2,875 by 30 feet (876 x 9 m).

== Airlines and destinations ==
The following airline offers scheduled passenger service:

Airlines	Destinations
Warbelow's Air Ventures	Fairbanks, Minto

== See also ==
- List of airports in Alaska

== Other sources ==
- Essential Air Service documents (Docket OST-2004-17563) from the U.S. Department of Transportation:
  - 90-Day Notice (April 9, 2004): of Bidzy Ta Hot Aana Corp. d/b/a Tanana Air Service of intent to terminate unsubsidized service at Minto and Manley, Alaska.
  - Order 2004-4-23 (April 30, 2004): allowing Tanana Air Service to terminate all scheduled air service at Minto and Manley Hot Springs, Alaska, and granting the carriers request to terminate such service on less than 90 days notice. Tanana Air Services termination is contingent, however, upon the commencement of suitable replacement service operated by Warbelows Air Ventures.
  - 90-Day Notice (May 12, 2004) of Warbelows Air Ventures, Inc. of intent to terminate unsubsidized service at Minto and Manley, Alaska
  - Order 2004-6-26 (June 28. 2004): requires Warbelow's Air Ventures to continue providing essential air service at Minto and Manley Hot Springs, Alaska, for an initial 30-day period; and requests proposals for replacement essential air service at the communities for a two-year period.
  - Order 2004-9-6 (September 7, 2004): selects Warbelow's Air Ventures to continue providing essential air service at Minto and Manley Hot Springs for a two-year period, and establishes a subsidy rate of $49,536 per year for service consisting of three flights per week over a Fairbanks-Manley-Minto-Fairbanks routing with 3-seat Cessna 206/207 aircraft.
  - Order 2006-7-4 (July 5, 2006): re-selecting Warbelow's Air Ventures, Inc., to provide subsidized essential air service (EAS) at Minto and Manley Hot Springs, Alaska, at an annual subsidy rate of $65,808 for the period of September 1, 2006, through August 31, 2008.
  - Order 2008-7-20 (July 15, 2008): selects Warbelow's Air Ventures, Inc. to continue providing essential air service at Manley Hot Springs and Minto, Alaska, for a new two-year period, through August 31, 2010, and established an annual subsidy rate of $84,170.
  - Order 2010-7-6 (July 13, 2010): selecting Warbelow's Air Ventures, Inc., to continue providing essential air service (EAS) at Manley Hot Springs and Minto, Alaska, and establishing an annual subsidy rate of $95,481, for a new two-year period, through September 30, 2012.
  - Order 2012-8-10 (August 3, 2012): re-selecting Warbelows Air Ventures, Inc., to provide Essential Air Service (EAS) at Manley and Minto, Alaska, for $91,068 annually for three round trips per week to Fairbanks. Aircraft Types: PA-31-350 Navajo, Cessna 206. effective Period: September 1, 2012, through August 31, 2014.
