= Froggie's Stopping Place on the Whoop-Up Trail =

- U.S. National Register of Historic Places
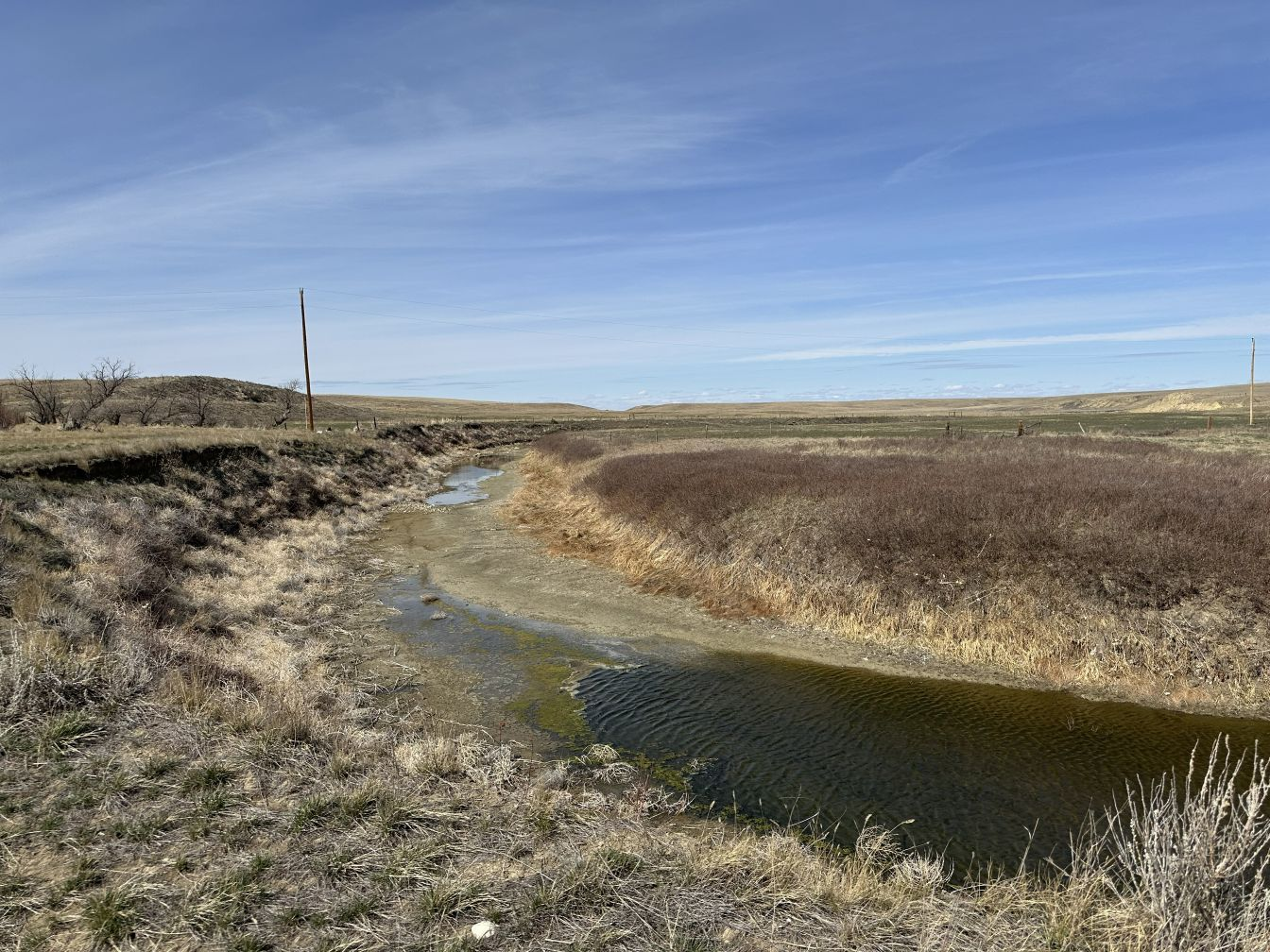
- Froggie's Stopping Point On The Whoop-Up Trail in 2026
- Location: Address restricted, vicinity of Conrad, Montana
- Area: 90 acres (36 ha)
- Built: 1870
- MPS: Whoop-Up Trail of Northcentral Montana MPS
- NRHP reference No.: 93000277
- Added to NRHP: April 15, 1993

Froggie's Stopping Place on the Whoop-Up Trail, also known as Lucille and as Midway Station, is a site on the National Register of Historic Places located in Conrad, Montana. It has been used as a hotel and Post Office. It was added to the Register on April 15, 1993.

Historically it consisted of a house, a post office (which possibly was incorporated into the house), a school, a barn or barns, and a windmill. In 1991 it consisted of three cobble foundations, some scattered depression features, and an area of pasture land in which a portion of the historic Whoop-Up Trail was still faintly visible.

== See also ==
- Macleod-Benton Trail
