= List of Alberta provincial ministers =

The list of Alberta provincial ministers shows the current and former members of the Executive Council of Alberta of the Alberta Legislature.

== Premier ==
Affiliation	Name	Date appointed	Date departed	Premier	Alberta Legislative Assembly
United Conservative	Danielle Smith	October 11, 2022	Incumbent	19th Premier of Alberta	30th Alberta Legislature

=== Deputy Premier ===
Deputy Premier
Affiliation	Name	Date appointed	Date departed	Premier(s)	Notes
United Conservative	Mike Ellis	June 9, 2023	Incumbent	Smith	co-deputy
United Conservative	Kaycee Madu	October 24, 2022	June 9, 2023	Smith	co-deputy
United Conservative	Nathan Neudorf	October 24, 2022	June 9, 2023	Smith	co-deputy
New Democratic	Sarah Hoffman	February 2, 2016	April 30, 2019	Notley	
Vacant
Progressive Conservative	Dave Hancock	December 13, 2013	March 23, 2014	Redford	Became Premier
Progressive Conservative	Thomas Lukaszuk	May 8, 2011	December 13, 2013	Redford	
Progressive Conservative	Doug Horner	October 12, 2011	May 8, 2012	Redford	
Progressive Conservative	Doug Horner	January 15, 2010	February 4, 2011	Stelmach	
Vacant
Progressive Conservative	Ron Stevens	June 27, 2007	March 12, 2008	Stelmach	
Vacant
Progressive Conservative	Shirley McClellan	March 19, 2001	December 15, 2006	Klein	
Vacant
Progressive Conservative	Ken Kowalski	December 15, 1992	October 21, 1994	Klein	
Progressive Conservative	Peter Elzinga	December 15, 1992	June 29, 1993	Klein	
Progressive Conservative	Jim Horsman	April 14, 1989	December 14, 1992	Getty	
Progressive Conservative	David John Russell	February 6, 1986	April 14, 1989	Getty	
Vacant
Progressive Conservative	Hugh Horner	September 10, 1971	September 24, 1979	Lougheed	

== Minister of Indigenous Relations ==
Minister of Indigenous Relations
Affiliation	Name	Date appointed	Date departed	Premier(s)	Notes
United Conservative	Rajan Sawhney	May 16, 2025	Present	Smith	Minister of Indigenous Relations
United Conservative	Rick Wilson	April 30, 2019	May 16, 2025	Kenney, Smith	Minister of Indigenous Relations
New Democratic	Richard Feehan	February 2, 2016	April 30, 2019	Notley	Minister of Indigenous Relations
New Democratic	Kathleen Ganley	May 24, 2015	February 2, 2016	Notley	Minister of Justice, Solicitor General and Aboriginal Affairs
Progressive Conservative	Jim Prentice	September 15, 2014	May 24, 2015	Prentice	Minister of Aboriginal Relations; Also Premier
Progressive Conservative	Frank Oberle	December 6, 2013	September 15, 2014	Hancock, Redford	Minister of Aboriginal Relations
Progressive Conservative	Robin Campbell	May 8, 2012	December 6, 2013	Redford	Minister of Aboriginal Relations
Progressive Conservative	Cal Dallas	October 12, 2011	May 8, 2012	Stelmach	Minister of Intergovernmental, International and Aboriginal Relations
Progressive Conservative	Len Webber	January 15, 2010	October 12, 2011	Stelmach	Minister of Aboriginal Relations
Progressive Conservative	Gene Zwozdesky	March 12, 2008	January 15, 2010	Stelmach	Minister of Aboriginal Relations
Progressive Conservative	Guy Boutilier	December 15, 2006	March 12, 2008	Stelmach	Minister of International, Intergovernmental, and Aboriginal Relations
Progressive Conservative	Pearl Calahasen	March 16, 2001	December 15, 2006	Klein	Minister of Aboriginal Affairs and Northern Development
No full minister responsible; Pearl Calahasen was associate minister (see below)
Progressive Conservative	Dave Hancock	March 29, 1997	May 26, 1999	Klein	Minister of Intergovernmental and Aboriginal Affairs
Vacant
Progressive Conservative	Milt Pahl	November 19, 1982	May 26, 1986	Getty, Lougheed	Minister without portfolio responsible for native affairs
Progressive Conservative	Don McCrimmon	March 23, 1979	November 19, 1982	Lougheed	Minister without portfolio responsible for native affairs
Progressive Conservative	Robert Bogle	April 3, 1975	March 23, 1979	Lougheed	Minister without portfolio responsible for native affairs
Progressive Conservative	Al Adair	September 10, 1971	April 2, 1975	Lougheed	Minister without portfolio responsible for native affairs

=== Associate Ministers in the Aboriginal Affairs portfolio ===
Affiliation	Name	Date appointed	Date departed	Premier(s)	Title
Progressive Conservative	David Dorward	September 15, 2014	May 24, 2015	Prentice	Associate Minister of Aboriginal Affairs
Progressive Conservative	Pearl Calahasen	May 26, 1999	March 15, 2001	Klein	Associate Minister of Aboriginal Affairs

== Minister of Advanced Education ==
Minister of Advanced Education
Affiliation	Name	Date appointed	Date departed	Premier(s)	Notes
United Conservative	Myles McDougall	May 16, 2025	Current	Smith	Minister of Advanced Education
United Conservative	Rajan Sawhney	June 10 2023	May 16, 2025	Smith	Minister of Advanced Education
United Conservative	Demetrios Nicolaides	April 30, 2019	June 10, 2022	Kenney, Smith	Minister of Advanced Education
New Democratic	Marlin Schmidt	February 2, 2016	April 30, 2019	Notley	Minister of Advanced Education
New Democratic	Lori Sigurdson	May 24, 2015	February 2, 2016	Notley	Minister of Innovation and Advanced Education and Minister of Jobs, Skills, Training and Labour
Progressive Conservative	Don Scott	September 15, 2014	May 24, 2015	Prentice	Minister of Innovation and Advanced Education
Progressive Conservative	Dave Hancock	December 6, 2013	September 15, 2014	Redford; Hancock	Minister of Innovation & Advanced Education; kept portfolio through premiership
Progressive Conservative	Thomas Lukaszuk	February 4, 2013	December 6, 2013	Redford	Minister of Enterprise & Advanced Education
Progressive Conservative	Stephen Khan	May 8, 2012	February 4, 2013	Redford	Minister of Enterprise & Advanced Education
Progressive Conservative	Greg Weadick	February 18, 2011	May 8, 2012	Stelmach	Minister of Advanced Education and Technology
Progressive Conservative	Doug Horner	December 15, 2006	February 4, 2011	Stelmach	Minister of Advanced Education and Technology
Progressive Conservative	Denis Herard	April 6, 2006	December 15, 2006	Klein	Minister of Advanced Education and Technology
Progressive Conservative	Dave Hancock	November 25, 2004	April 5, 2006	Klein	Minister of Advanced Education
Progressive Conservative	Lyle Oberg	May 26, 1999	November 25, 2004	Klein	Minister of Learning
Progressive Conservative	Clint Dunford	March 29, 1997	May 26, 1999	Klein	Minister of Advanced Education and Career Development
Progressive Conservative	Jack Ady	December 15, 1992	March 29, 1997	Klein	Minister of Advanced Education and Career Development
Progressive Conservative	John Gogo	March 14, 1989	December 15, 1992	Getty	Minister of Advanced Education
Progressive Conservative	David John Russell	May 26, 1986	March 14, 1989	Getty	Minister of Advanced Education
Progressive Conservative	Archibald D. Johnston	November 19, 1982	May 26, 1986	Getty, Lougheed	Minister of Advanced Education
Progressive Conservative	Jim Horsman	March 23, 1979	November 19, 1982	Lougheed	Minister of Advanced Education and Manpower
Progressive Conservative	Bert Hohol	April 3, 1975	March 23, 1979	Lougheed	Minister of Advanced Education and Manpower
Progressive Conservative	James Foster	September 10, 1971	April 3, 1975	Lougheed	Minister of Advanced Education

== Minister of Agriculture and Irrigation ==
Minister of Agriculture
Affiliation	Name	Date appointed	Date departed	Premier(s)	Notes
United Conservative	RJ Sigurdson	June 9, 2023	Current	Smith	Minister of Agriculture and Irrigation
United Conservative	Nate Horner	November 5, 2021	June 9, 2023	Kenney, Smith	Minister of Agriculture and Rural Development; Minister of Agriculture and Irrigation
United Conservative	Devin Dreeshen	April 30, 2019	November 5, 2021	Kenney	Minister of Agriculture and Forestry
New Democratic	Oneil Carlier	May 24, 2015	April 30, 2019	Notley	Minister of Agriculture and Forestry
Progressive Conservative	Verlyn Olson	May 8, 2012	May 24, 2015	Prentice, Hancock, Redford	Minister of Agriculture and Rural Development
Progressive Conservative	Evan Berger	October 12, 2011	May 8, 2012	Redford	Minister of Agriculture and Rural Development
Progressive Conservative	Jack Hayden	January 15, 2010	October 12, 2011	Stelmach	Minister of Agriculture and Rural Development
Progressive Conservative	George Groeneveld	March 12, 2008	January 15, 2010	Stelmach	Minister of Agriculture and Rural Development
Progressive Conservative	George Groeneveld	December 15, 2006	March 12, 2008	Stelmach	Minister of Agriculture and Food
Progressive Conservative	Doug Horner	November 25, 2004	December 15, 2006	Klein	Minister of Agriculture, Food, and Rural Development
Progressive Conservative	Shirley McClellan	March 16, 2001	November 25, 2004	Klein	Minister of Agriculture, Food, and Rural Development
Progressive Conservative	Ty Lund	May 26, 1999	March 16, 2001	Klein	Minister of Agriculture, Food, and Rural Development
Progressive Conservative	Ed Stelmach	March 29, 1997	May 26, 1999	Klein	Minister of Agriculture, Food, and Rural Development
Progressive Conservative	Walter Paszkowski	June 30, 1993	March 29, 1997	Klein	Minister of Agriculture, Food, and Rural Development
Progressive Conservative	Ernie Isley	April 14, 1989	June 30, 1993	Klein, Getty	Minister of Agriculture, Food, and Rural Development
Progressive Conservative	Peter Elzinga	May 26, 1986	April 14, 1989	Getty	Minister of Agriculture; Minister of Agriculture and Trade
Progressive Conservative	LeRoy Fjordbotten	November 19, 1982	May 26, 1986	Getty, Lougheed	
Progressive Conservative	Dallas Schmidt	March 23, 1979	November 19, 1982	Lougheed	
Progressive Conservative	Marvin Moore	April 3, 1975	March 23, 1979	Lougheed	
Progressive Conservative	Hugh Horner	September 10, 1971	April 3, 1975	Lougheed	
Social Credit	Henry Ruste	July 16, 1968	September 10, 1971	Strom	
Social Credit	Harry Strom	October 15, 1962	July 16, 1968	Manning	
Social Credit	Leonard Halmrast	January 5, 1954	October 15, 1962	Manning	
Social Credit	David A. Ure	May 8, 1948	December 23, 1953	Manning	
Social Credit	Duncan MacMillan	December 3, 1940	May 7, 1948	Manning, Aberhart	
Social Credit	David Mullen	May 1, 1937	October 28, 1940	Aberhart	
Social Credit	William Chant	September 3, 1935	May 1, 1937	Aberhart	
United Farmers	Frank Grisdale	June 15, 1934	September 3, 1935	Reid, Brownlee	
United Farmers	George Hoadley	August 31, 1921	June 15, 1934	Brownlee, Greenfield	
Liberal	Duncan Marshall	November 1, 1909	August 31, 1921	Stewart, Sifton, Rutherford	
Liberal	William Finlay	September 9, 1905	November 1, 1909	Rutherford	

=== Associate ministers in the Agriculture portfolio ===
Affiliation	Name	Date appointed	Date departed	Premier(s)	Title
Progressive Conservative	Everett McDonald	March 17, 2015	May 24, 2015	Prentice	Associate Minister of Agriculture
Progressive Conservative	Shirley McClellan	April 14, 1989	December 14, 1992	Getty	Associate Minister of Agriculture
Progressive Conservative	Shirley Cripps	May 26, 1986	April 14, 1989	Getty	Associate Minister of Agriculture

== Minister of Children and Family Services ==
Minister of Children and Youth Services
Affiliation	Name	Date appointed	Date departed	Premier(s)	Notes
United Conservative	Searle Turton	June 9, 2023	Current	Smith	Minister of Children and Family Services
United Conservative	Mickey Amery	October 24, 2022	June 9, 2023	Smith	Minister of Children's Services
United Conservative	Matt Jones	June 21, 2022	October 24, 2022	Kenney	Minister of Children's Services
United Conservative	Jason Luan	July 8, 2021	October 24, 2022	Kenney	Minister of Community and Social Services
United Conservative	Rebecca Schulz	April 30, 2019	June 11, 2022	Kenney	Minister of Children's Services
New Democratic	Danielle Larivee	January 19, 2017	April 29, 2019	Notley	Minister of Children's Services
Progressive Conservative	Yvonne Fritz	January 15, 2010	October 11, 2011	Stelmach	Minister of Children and Youth Services
Progressive Conservative	Janis Tarchuk	March 13, 2008	January 14, 2010	Stelmach	Minister of Children and Youth Services
Progressive Conservative	Janis Tarchuk	December 15, 2006	March 12, 2008	Stelmach	Minister of Children's Services
Progressive Conservative	Heather Forsyth	November 25, 2004	December 14, 2006	Klein	Minister of Children's Services
Progressive Conservative	Iris Evans	May 26, 1999	November 24, 2004	Klein	Minister of Children's Services
Progressive Conservative	Lyle Oberg	March 26, 1997	May 25, 1999	Klein	Minister of Family and Social Services
Progressive Conservative	Stockwell Day	May 31, 1996	March 25, 1997	Klein	Minister of Family and Social Services
Progressive Conservative	Mike Cardinal	December 15, 1992	May 30, 1996	Klein	Minister of Family and Social Services
Progressive Conservative	John Oldring	April 14, 1989	December 14, 1992	Getty	Minister of Family and Social Services
Progressive Conservative	Connie Osterman	May 26, 1986	April 13, 1989	Getty	Minister of Social Services
Progressive Conservative	Connie Osterman	February 6, 1986	May 25, 1986	Getty	Minister of Social Services and Community Health
Progressive Conservative	Neil Webber	November 19, 1982	February 5, 1986	Lougheed, Getty	Minister of Social Services and Community Health
Progressive Conservative	Robert Bogle	March 23, 1979	November 18, 1982	Lougheed	Minister of Social Services and Community Health
Progressive Conservative	Helen Hunley	April 15, 1975	March 22, 1979	Lougheed	Minister of Social Services and Community Health
Progressive Conservative	Horst Schmid	September 10, 1971	April 2, 1975	Lougheed	Minister of Culture, Youth, and Recreation
Social Credit	Ambrose Holowach	April 1, 1971	September 9, 1971	Strom	Minister of Culture, Youth, and Recreation
Social Credit	Gordon Taylor	May 19, 1970	March 31, 1971	Strom	Minister of Youth
Social Credit	Robert Curtis Clark	July 4, 1966	May 18, 1970	Manning, Strom	Minister of Youth

== Minister of Culture ==
The current ministry was created in 2019 and has lost and gained several titles and portfolios since then, but is based on agencies from other cultural ministries dating back to 1971, and reorganized in 1992.

Minister of Culture
Affiliation	Name	Date appointed	Date departed	Premier(s)	Notes
United Conservative	Tanya Fir	June 9, 2023	Current	Smith	Minister of Arts, Culture and Status of Women
United Conservative	Jason Luan	October 24, 2022	May 29, 2023	Smith	Minister of Culture
United Conservative	Ron Orr	July 8, 2021	October 24, 2022	Kenney	Minister of Culture
United Conservative	Leela Aheer	April 30, 2019	July 7, 2021	Kenney	Minister of Culture, Multiculturalism and Status of Women
New Democratic	Ricardo Miranda	February 2, 2016	April 29, 2019	Notley	Minister of Culture and Tourism
New Democratic	David Eggen	May 24, 2015	February 1, 2016	Notley	Minister of Culture and Tourism
Progressive Conservative	Maureen Kubinec	September 15, 2014	May 23, 2015	Prentice	Minister of Culture and Tourism
Progressive Conservative	Heather Klimchuk	May 8, 2012	September 14, 2014	Redford, Hancock	Minister of Culture
Progressive Conservative	Heather Klimchuk	October 12, 2011	May 7, 2012	Redford	Minister of Culture and Community Services
Progressive Conservative	Lindsay Blackett	March 13, 2008	October 11, 2011	Stelmach	Minister of Culture and Community Spirit
Progressive Conservative	Hector Goudreau	December 15, 2006	March 12, 2008	Stelmach	Minister of Tourism, Parks, Recreation and Culture
Vacant
Progressive Conservative	Doug Main	April 14, 1989	December 14, 1992	Getty	Minister of Culture and Multiculturalism
Progressive Conservative	Greg Stevens	September 10, 1987	April 13, 1989	Getty	Minister of Culture and Multiculturalism
Progressive Conservative	Dennis Anderson	May 26, 1986	September 9, 1987	Getty	Minister of Culture and Multiculturalism
Progressive Conservative	Mary LeMessurier	March 23, 1979	May 25, 1986	Lougheed, Getty	Minister Responsible for Culture
Progressive Conservative	Horst Schmid	September 10, 1971	March 22, 1979	Lougheed	Minister of Culture, Youth, and Recreation (1971–75)
Social Credit	Ambrose Holowach	April 1, 1971	September 9, 1971	Strom	Minister of Culture, Youth, and Recreation

== Minister of Economic Development ==
Minister of Economic Development
Affiliation	Name	Date appointed	Date departed	Premier(s)	Notes
United Conservative	Brian Jean	October 24, 2022	Incumbent	Smith	Minister of Jobs, Economy and Northern Development
United Conservative	Tanya Fir	August 26, 2022	October 23, 2022	Kenney	Minister of Jobs, Economy and Innovation
United Conservative	Doug Schweitzer	August 25, 2020	August 5, 2022	Kenney	Minister of Jobs, Economy and Innovation
United Conservative	Tanya Fir	April 30, 2019	August 25, 2020	Kenney	Minister of Economic Development, Trade and Tourism
New Democratic	Deron Bilous	October 22, 2015	April 30, 2019	Notley	Minister of Economic Development & Trade
Vacant
Progressive Conservative	Clint Dunford	November 25, 2004	December 15, 2006	Klein	
Progressive Conservative	Mark Norris	March 16, 2001	November 25, 2004	Klein	
Progressive Conservative	Jon Havelock	May 26, 1999	March 16, 2001	Klein	
Progressive Conservative	Pat Nelson	March 29, 1997	May 26, 1999	Klein	Minister of Economic Development and Tourism
Progressive Conservative	Steve West	May 31, 1996	March 29, 1997	Klein	Minister of Economic Development and Tourism
Progressive Conservative	Murray Smith	September 15, 1994	May 31, 1996	Klein	Minister of Economic Development and Tourism
Progressive Conservative	Ken Kowalski	June 30, 1993	September 15, 1994	Klein	Minister of Economic Development and Tourism
Progressive Conservative	Donald H. Sparrow	December 15, 1992	June 29, 1993	Klein	Minister of Economic Development and Tourism
Progressive Conservative	Peter Elzinga	April 14, 1989	December 14, 1992	Getty	Minister of Economic Development and Trade
Progressive Conservative	Larry Shaben	May 26, 1986	April 13, 1989	Getty	Minister of Economic Development and Trade
Progressive Conservative	Hugh Planche	October 1, 1979	May 25, 1986	Getty, Lougheed	
Progressive Conservative	Hugh Horner	March 23, 1979	September 30, 1979	Lougheed	
Vacant
Social Credit	Allen Patrick	August 2, 1955	September 1, 1959	Manning	Minister of Economic Affairs
Social Credit	Alfred Hooke	April 20, 1945	August 2, 1955	Manning	Minister of Economic Affairs

=== Associate Ministers in the Economic Development portfolio ===
Affiliation	Name	Date appointed	Date departed	Premier(s)	Title
Progressive Conservative	Horst Schmid	March 23, 1979	November 18, 1982	Lougheed	Minister of State for Economic Development - International Trade

== Minister of Education and Childcare ==
The title was changed from Minister of Education to the current title on May 16, 2025.

Minister of Education
Affiliation	Name	Date appointed	Date departed	Premier(s)	Notes
United Conservative	Demetrios Nicolaides	June 9, 2023	Current	Smith	
United Conservative	Adriana LaGrange	April 30, 2019	June 9, 2023	Smith, Kenney	
New Democratic	David Eggen	May 24, 2015	April 30, 2019	Notley	
Progressive Conservative	Gordon Dirks	September 15, 2014	May 5, 2015	Prentice	
Progressive Conservative	Jeff Johnson	May 8, 2012	September 15, 2014	Redford, Hancock	
Progressive Conservative	Thomas Lukaszuk	October 12, 2011	May 8, 2012	Redford, Hancock	
Progressive Conservative	Dave Hancock	March 12, 2008	October 12, 2011	Stelmach	
Progressive Conservative	Ron Liepert	December 15, 2006	March 12, 2008	Stelmach	
Progressive Conservative	Gene Zwozdesky	November 25, 2004	December 15, 2006	Klein	
Progressive Conservative	Lyle Oberg	May 26, 1999	November 25, 2004	Klein	Minister of Learning
Progressive Conservative	Gary Mar	May 31, 1996	May 26, 1999	Klein	
Progressive Conservative	Halvar Jonson	December 14, 1992	May 31, 1996	Klein	
Progressive Conservative	Jim Dinning	September 8, 1988	December 14, 1992	Getty	
Progressive Conservative	Nancy Betkowski	May 26, 1986	September 8, 1988	Getty	
Progressive Conservative	Neil Webber	February 6, 1986	May 25, 1986	Getty	
Progressive Conservative	David King	March 23, 1979	February 5, 1986	Lougheed	
Progressive Conservative	Julian Koziak	April 3, 1975	March 22, 1979	Lougheed	
Progressive Conservative	Lou Hyndman	September 10, 1971	April 2, 1975	Lougheed	
Social Credit	Robert Curtis Clark	December 12, 1968	September 10, 1971	Strom	
Social Credit	Raymond Reierson	June 29, 1967	December 12, 1968	Manning	
Social Credit	Randolph McKinnon	July 31, 1964	June 29, 1967	Manning	
Social Credit	Anders Aalborg	September 9, 1952	July 31, 1964	Manning	
Social Credit	Ivan Casey	February 23, 1948	September 9, 1952	Manning	
Social Credit	Ronald Ansley	September 12, 1944	February 23, 1948	Manning	
Social Credit	Solon Earl Low	June 1, 1943	September 12, 1944	Manning	
Social Credit	William Aberhart	September 3, 1935	June 1, 1943	Aberhart	
United Farmers	Perren Baker	August 31, 1921	September 3, 1935	Reid, Brownlee, Greenfield	
Liberal	George P. Smith	August 26, 1918	August 31, 1921	Stewart	
Liberal	John R. Boyle	May 4, 1912	August 26, 1918	Stewart, Sifton	
Liberal	Charles R. Mitchell	June 1, 1910	May 4, 1912	Sifton	
Liberal	Alexander Cameron Rutherford	September 9, 1905	May 26, 1910	Rutherford	

== Minister of Energy and Minerals ==
Minister of Energy
Affiliation	Name	Date appointed	Date departed	Premier(s)	Notes
United Conservative	Brian Jean	June 9, 2023	Incumbent	Smith	
United Conservative	Peter Guthrie	October 24, 2022	June 9, 2023	Smith	Title changed from Minister of Energy to Minister of Energy and Minerals during tenure.
United Conservative	Sonya Savage	April 30, 2019	October 24, 2022	Kenney; Smith	
New Democratic	Marg McCuaig-Boyd	May 24, 2015	April 29, 2019	Notley	
Progressive Conservative	Frank Oberle Jr.	September 15, 2014	May 23, 2015	Prentice	
Progressive Conservative	Diana McQueen	December 13, 2013	September 14, 2014	Redford; Hancock	
Progressive Conservative	Ken Hughes	May 8, 2012	December 12, 2013	Redford	
Progressive Conservative	Ted Morton	October 12, 2011	May 7, 2012	Redford	
Progressive Conservative	Ron Liepert	January 15, 2010	October 11, 2011	Stelmach	
Progressive Conservative	Mel Knight	December 15, 2006	January 14, 2010	Stelmach	
Progressive Conservative	Greg Melchin	November 25, 2004	December 14, 2006	Klein	
Progressive Conservative	Murray Smith	March 19, 2001	November 24, 2004	Klein	
Progressive Conservative	Mike Cardinal	June 7, 2000	March 18, 2001	Klein	Minister of Resource Development
Progressive Conservative	Steve West	May 26, 1999	June 6, 2000	Klein	Minister of Resource Development
Progressive Conservative	Steve West	March 26, 1997	May 25, 1999	Klein	
Progressive Conservative	Pat Nelson	December 15, 1992	March 25, 1997	Klein	
Progressive Conservative	Rick Orman	April 14, 1989	December 14, 1992	Getty	
Progressive Conservative	Neil Webber	May 26, 1986	April 13, 1989	Getty	
Progressive Conservative	John Zaozirny	November 19, 1982	May 25, 1986	Lougheed; Getty	Minister of Energy and Natural Resources
Progressive Conservative	Merv Leitch	March 23, 1979	November 18, 1982	Lougheed	Minister of Energy and Natural Resources
Progressive Conservative	Don Getty	April 3, 1975	March 22, 1979	Lougheed	Minister of Energy and Natural Resources
Progressive Conservative	Bill Dickie	September 10, 1971	April 2, 1975	Lougheed	Minister of Mines and Minerals
Social Credit	Allen Russell Patrick	October 15, 1962	September 9, 1971	Manning; Strom	Minister of Mines and Minerals
Social Credit	Ernest Manning	September 16, 1952	October 14, 1962	Manning	Minister of Mines and Minerals
Social Credit	Nathan Eldon Tanner	April 1, 1949	September 15, 1952	Manning	Minister of Mines and Minerals
--	various	October 1, 1930	April 1, 1949	--	see Minister of Forestry, Lands and Wildlife (Minister of Land and Mines)

=== Associate ministers within the Resource Development portfolio ===
Affiliation	Name	Date appointed	Date departed	Premier(s)	Title
Progressive Conservative	Donna Kennedy-Glans	December 13, 2013	March 17, 2014	Redford	Associate Minister of Electricity and Renewable Energy
Progressive Conservative	Mike Cardinal	May 26, 1999	June 2, 2000	Klein	Associate Minister of Forestry
Progressive Conservative	Donald H. Sparrow	November 19, 1982	February 5, 1986	Lougheed, Getty	Associate Minister of Public Lands and Wildlife
Progressive Conservative	Dallas Schmidt	August 30, 1976	March 22, 1979	Lougheed	Associate Minister of Energy and Natural Resources responsible for Public Lands

== Minister of the Environment ==
Minister of the Environment
Affiliation	Name	Date appointed	Date departed	Premier(s)	Notes
United Conservative	Rebecca Schulz	June 9, 2023	Current	Smith	Minister of Environment and Protected Areas
United Conservative	Sonya Savage	October 24, 2022	May 29, 2023	Smith	Minister of Environment and Protected Areas
United Conservative	Whitney Issik	June 21, 2022	October 24, 2022	Kenney	Minister of Environment and Parks
United Conservative	Jason Nixon	April 30, 2019	June 20, 2022	Kenney	Minister of Environment and Parks
New Democratic	Shannon Phillips	May 24, 2015	April 29, 2019	Notley	Minister of Environment and Parks
Progressive Conservative	Kyle Fawcett	September 15, 2014	May 23, 2015	Prentice	Minister of Environment and Sustainable Resource Development
Progressive Conservative	Robin Campbell	December 13, 2013	September 14, 2014	Redford, Hancock	Minister of Environment and Sustainable Resource Development
Progressive Conservative	Diana McQueen	May 8, 2012	December 12, 2013	Redford	Minister of Environment and Sustainable Resource Development
Progressive Conservative	Diana McQueen	October 12, 2011	May 7, 2012	Redford	Minister of Environment and Water
Progressive Conservative	Rob Renner	December 15, 2006	October 11, 2011	Stelmach	Minister of the Environment
Progressive Conservative	Guy Boutilier	November 25, 2004	December 14, 2006	Klein	Minister of the Environment
Progressive Conservative	Lorne Taylor	March 19, 2001	November 24, 2004	Klein	Minister of the Environment
Progressive Conservative	Halvar Jonson	June 7, 2000	March 18, 2001	Klein	Minister of the Environment
Progressive Conservative	Gary Mar	May 26, 1999	June 6, 2000	Klein	Minister of the Environment
Progressive Conservative	Ty Lund	October 21, 1994	May 25, 1999	Klein	Minister of Environmental Protection
Progressive Conservative	Brian Evans	December 15, 1992	October 20, 1994	Klein	Minister of Environmental Protection
Progressive Conservative	Ralph Klein	April 14, 1989	December 14, 1992	Getty	Minister of the Environment
Progressive Conservative	Ian Reid	September 8, 1988	April 13, 1989	Getty	Minister of the Environment
Progressive Conservative	Ken Kowalski	May 26, 1986	September 7, 1988	Getty	Minister of the Environment
Progressive Conservative	Frederick Deryl Bradley	November 19, 1982	May 25, 1986	Lougheed, Getty	Minister of the Environment
Progressive Conservative	Jack Cookson	March 23, 1979	November 18, 1982	Lougheed	Minister of the Environment
Progressive Conservative	David John Russell	April 3, 1975	March 22, 1979	Lougheed	Minister of the Environment
Progressive Conservative	William Yurko	September 10, 1971	April 2, 1975	Lougheed	Minister of the Environment
Social Credit	James Douglas Henderson	April 1, 1971	September 9, 1971	Strom	Minister of the Environment

== Minister of Family and Social Services ==
Minister of Family and Social Services
Affiliation	Name	Date appointed	Date departed	Premier(s)	Notes
United Conservative	Jeremy Nixon	October 24, 2022	Current	Smith	Minister of Seniors, Community and Social Services
United Conservative	Jason Luan	July 8, 2021	October 24, 2022	Kenney	Minister of Community and Social Services
United Conservative	Rajan Sawhney	April 30, 2019	July 7, 2021	Kenney	Minister of Community and Social Services
New Democratic	Irfan Sabir	January 19, 2017	April 29, 2019	Notley	Minister of Community and Social Services
New Democratic	Irfan Sabir	May 24, 2015	January 18, 2017	Notley	Minister of Human Services
Progressive Conservative	Heather Klimchuk	September 15, 2014	May 23, 2015	Prentice	Minister of Human Services
Progressive Conservative	Manmeet Bhullar	December 13, 2013	September 14, 2014	Redford, Hancock	Minister of Human Services
Progressive Conservative	Dave Hancock	October 12, 2011	December 12, 2013	Redford	Minister of Human Services
Vacant
Progressive Conservative	Lyle Oberg	March 26, 1997	May 25, 1999	Klein	Minister of Family and Social Services
Progressive Conservative	Stockwell Day	May 31, 1996	March 25, 1997	Klein	Minister of Family and Social Services
Progressive Conservative	Mike Cardinal	December 15, 1992	May 30, 1996	Klein	Minister of Family and Social Services
Progressive Conservative	John Oldring	April 14, 1989	December 14, 1992	Getty	Minister of Family and Social Services
Progressive Conservative	Connie Osterman	February 6, 1986	April 13, 1989	Getty	Minister of Social Services (Note: Minister of Social Services and Community Health (February 6, 1986–May 25, 1986))
Progressive Conservative	Neil Webber	November 19, 1982	February 5, 1986	Lougheed, Getty	Minister of Social Services and Community Health
Progressive Conservative	Robert Bogle	March 23, 1979	November 18, 1982	Lougheed	Minister of Social Services and Community Health
Progressive Conservative	Helen Hunley	April 15, 1975	March 22, 1979	Lougheed	Minister of Social Services and Community Health

=== Associate ministers in the Family and Social Services portfolio ===
Affiliation	Name	Date appointed	Date departed	Premier(s)	Title
Progressive Conservative	Roy Brassard	September 18, 1989	September 3, 1991	Getty	Associate Minister of Family and Social Services
Progressive Conservative	Norm Weiss	April 14, 1989	September 17, 1989	Getty	Associate Minister of Family and Social Services

== Minister of Finance ==
Minister of Finance
Affiliation	Name	Date appointed	Date departed	Premier(s)	Notes
United Conservative	Nate Horner	June 9, 2023	Present	Smith	President of Treasury Board and Minister of Finance
United Conservative	Travis Toews	October 24, 2022	May 29, 2023	Smith	President of Treasury Board and Minister of Finance
United Conservative	Jason Nixon	June 21, 2022	October 24, 2022	Kenney	President of Treasury Board and Minister of Finance
United Conservative	Travis Toews	April 30, 2019	May 31, 2022	Kenney	President of Treasury Board and Minister of Finance
New Democratic	Joe Ceci	May 24, 2015	April 29, 2019	Notley	President of Treasury Board and Minister of Finance
Progressive Conservative	Robin Campbell	September 15, 2014	May 23, 2015	Prentice	President of Treasury Board and Minister of Finance
Progressive Conservative	Doug Horner	May 8, 2012	September 14, 2014	Redford, Hancock	President of Treasury Board and Minister of Finance
Progressive Conservative	Ron Liepert	October 12, 2011	May 7, 2012	Redford	Minister of Finance
Progressive Conservative	Lloyd Snelgrove	January 31, 2011	October 11, 2011	Stelmach	Minister of Finance and Enterprise
Progressive Conservative	Ted Morton	January 15, 2010	January 28, 2011	Stelmach	Minister of Finance and Enterprise
Progressive Conservative	Iris Evans	March 13, 2008	January 14, 2010	Stelmach	Minister of Finance and Enterprise
Progressive Conservative	Lyle Oberg	December 15, 2006	March 12, 2008	Stelmach	Minister of Finance
Progressive Conservative	Shirley McClellan	November 25, 2004	December 14, 2006	Klein	Minister of Finance
Progressive Conservative	Pat Nelson	March 19, 2001	November 24, 2004	Klein	Minister of Finance
Progressive Conservative	Steve West	June 7, 2000	March 18, 2001	Klein	Provincial Treasurer
Progressive Conservative	Stockwell Day	March 26, 1997	June 1, 2000	Klein	Provincial Treasurer
Progressive Conservative	Jim Dinning	December 15, 1992	March 25, 1997	Klein	Provincial Treasurer
Progressive Conservative	Archibald D. Johnston	May 26, 1986	December 14, 1992	Getty	Provincial Treasurer
Progressive Conservative	Lou Hyndman	March 23, 1979	May 25, 1986	Lougheed, Getty	Provincial Treasurer
Progressive Conservative	Merv Leitch	April 3, 1975	March 22, 1979	Lougheed	Provincial Treasurer
Progressive Conservative	Gordon Miniely	September 10, 1971	April 2, 1975	Lougheed	Provincial Treasurer
Social Credit	Anders Aalborg	July 29, 1964	September 9, 1971	Manning, Strom	Provincial Treasurer
Social Credit	Ted Hinman	August 2, 1955	July 28, 1964	Manning	Provincial Treasurer
Social Credit	Clarence Gerhart	December 23, 1954	August 1, 1955	Manning	Provincial Treasurer
Social Credit	Ernest Manning	September 12, 1944	December 22, 1954	Manning	Provincial Treasurer
Social Credit	Solon Earl Low	February 2, 1937	September 11, 1944	Aberhart, Manning	Provincial Treasurer
Social Credit	Charles Cockroft	September 3, 1935	February 1, 1937	Aberhart	Provincial Treasurer
United Farmers	John Russell Love	July 10, 1934	September 2, 1935	Reid	Provincial Treasurer
United Farmers	Richard Gavin Reid	November 3, 1923	July 9, 1934	Greenfield, Brownlee	Provincial Treasurer
United Farmers	Herbert Greenfield	August 13, 1921	November 2, 1923	Greenfield	Provincial Treasurer
Liberal	Charles Richmond Mitchell	November 28, 1913	August 12, 1921	Sifton, Stewart	Provincial Treasurer
Liberal	Arthur Sifton	March 27, 1913	November 27, 1913	Sifton	Provincial Treasurer
Liberal	Malcolm McKenzie	May 4, 1912	March 15, 1913	Sifton	Provincial Treasurer
Liberal	Arthur Sifton	June 1, 1910	May 3, 1912	Sifton	Provincial Treasurer
Liberal	Alexander Cameron Rutherford	September 8, 1905	May 26, 1910	Rutherford	Provincial Treasurer

== Minister of Forestry, Lands and Wildlife ==
Minister of Forestry, Lands and Wildlife
Affiliation	Name	Date appointed	Date departed	Premier(s)	Notes
United Conservative	Todd Loewen	October 24, 2022	Current	Smith	Minister of Forestry, Parks and Tourism
United Conservative	Nate Horner	November 5, 2021	October 24, 2022	Kenney	Minister of Agriculture, Forestry and Rural Economic Development
United Conservative	Devin Dreeshen	April 30, 2019	November 5, 2021	Kenney	Minister of Agriculture and Forestry
New Democratic	Oneil Carlier	May 24, 2015	April 29, 2019	Notley	Minister of Agriculture and Forestry
Vacant
Progressive Conservative	LeRoy Fjordbotten	September 10, 1987	December 14, 1992	Getty	Minister of Forestry, Lands and Wildlife
Progressive Conservative	Donald H. Sparrow	February 6, 1986	September 9, 1987	Getty	Minister of Forestry, Lands and Wildlife (Note: Minister of Forestry (February 6, 1986–May 25, 1986))
Vacant
Progressive Conservative	Allan Warrack	September 10, 1971	April 2, 1975	Lougheed	Minister of Lands and Forests
Social Credit	Joseph Donovan Ross	May 20, 1969	September 9, 1971	Strom	Minister of Lands and Forests
Social Credit	Henry Ruste	December 12, 1968	May 19, 1969	Strom	Minister of Lands and Forests
Social Credit	Alfred Hooke	July 16, 1968	December 11, 1968	Manning	Minister of Lands and Forests
Social Credit	Henry Ruste	February 16, 1965	July 15, 1968	Manning	Minister of Lands and Forests
Social Credit	Norman Willmore	August 2, 1955	February 3, 1965	Manning	Minister of Lands and Forests
Social Credit	Ivan Casey	September 9, 1952	August 1, 1955	Manning	Minister of Lands and Forests
Social Credit	Nathan Eldon Tanner	January 5, 1937	September 8, 1952	Aberhart, Manning	Minister of Lands and Forests (Note: Minister of Lands and Mines (January 5, 1937–March 31, 1949))
Social Credit	Charles Cathmer Ross	September 3, 1935	January 5, 1937	Aberhart	Minister of Lands and Mines
United Farmers	Hugh Allen	July 10, 1934	September 2, 1935	Reid	Minister of Lands and Mines
United Farmers	Richard Gavin Reid	October 2, 1930	July 9, 1934	Brownlee	Minister of Lands and Mines

=== Associate Ministers in the Forestry, Lands and Wildlife portfolio ===
Affiliation	Name	Date appointed	Date departed	Premier(s)	Title
Progressive Conservative	Mike Cardinal	May 26, 1999	June 6, 2000	Klein	Associate Minister of Forestry
Progressive Conservative	Donald H. Sparrow	November 19, 1982	February 5, 1986	Lougheed, Getty	Associate Minister of Public Lands and Wildlife
Progressive Conservative	Bud Miller	March 23, 1979	November 18, 1982	Lougheed	Associate Minister of Public Lands and Wildlife
Progressive Conservative	Dallas Schmidt	August 30, 1976	March 22, 1979	Lougheed	Associate Minister of Energy and Natural Resources, Responsible for Public Lands

== Minister of Housing ==
Minister of Housing
Affiliation	Name	Date appointed	Date departed	Premier(s)	Notes
Vacant
United Conservative	Josephine Pon	April 30, 2019	October 24, 2022	Kenney	Minister of Seniors and Housing
New Democratic	Lori Sigurdson	February 2, 2016	April 29, 2019	Notley	Minister of Seniors and Housing
Vacant
Progressive Conservative	Jonathan Denis	January 15, 2010	October 11, 2011	Stelmach	Minister of Housing and Urban Affairs
Progressive Conservative	Yvonne Fritz	March 13, 2008	January 14, 2010	Stelmach	Minister of Housing and Urban Affairs
Progressive Conservative	Ray Danyluk	December 15, 2006	March 12, 2008	Stelmach	Minister of Municipal Affairs and Housing
Vacant
Progressive Conservative	Larry Shaben	November 19, 1982	May 25, 1986	Lougheed, Getty	Minister of Housing
Progressive Conservative	Tom Chambers	April 24, 1978	November 18, 1982	Lougheed	Minister of Housing and Public Works
Progressive Conservative	William Yurko	April 3, 1975	April 23, 1978	Lougheed	Minister of Housing and Public Works

=== Associate Ministers in the Housing and Urban Affairs Portfolio ===
Affiliation	Name	Date appointed	Date departed	Premier(s)	Title
Progressive Conservative	Yvonne Fritz	June 27, 2007	March 12, 2008	Stelmach	Associate Minister in charge of Affordable Housing and Urban Development

== Minister of Industry and Commerce ==
Minister of Industry and Commerce
Affiliation	Name	Date appointed	Date departed	Premier(s)	Notes
Vacant
Progressive Conservative	Fred Peacock	September 10, 1971	April 2, 1975	Lougheed	Minister of Industry and Commerce (Note: Minister of Industry and Tourism (September 10, 1971–June 1, 1972))
Social Credit	Raymond Ratzlaff	May 27, 1969	September 9, 1971	Strom	Minister of Industry and Tourism
Social Credit	Allen Russell Patrick	September 1, 1959	May 26, 1969	Manning, Strom	Minister of Industry and Development (Note: Minister of Industry and Tourism (May 2, 1968 – May 26, 1969))
Social Credit	Raymond Reierson	August 2, 1955	August 31, 1959	Manning	Minister of Industries and Labour
Social Credit	Norman Willmore	November 10, 1953	August 1, 1955	Manning	Minister of Industries and Labour
Social Credit	John Lyle Robinson	May 8, 1948	October 29, 1953	Manning	Minister of Industries and Labour
Social Credit	Clarence Gerhart	September 12, 1944	May 7, 1948	Manning	Minister of Trade and Industry
Social Credit	Ernest Manning	July 2, 1937	September 11, 1944	Aberhart, Manning	Minister of Trade and Industry
Social Credit	Wallace Warren Cross	January 20, 1937	July 1, 1937	Aberhart	Minister of Trade and Industry
Social Credit	Ernest Manning	October 19, 1935	January 19, 1937	Aberhart	Minister of Trade and Industry
Social Credit	William Chant	September 3, 1935	October 18, 1935	Aberhart	Minister of Trade and Industry
United Farmers	George Hoadley	October 18, 1934	September 2, 1935	Reid	Minister of Trade and Industry

== Minister of Infrastructure ==
Minister of Infrastructure
Affiliation	Name	Date appointed	Date departed	Premier(s)	Notes
United Conservative	Martin Long	February 27, 2025	Current	Smith	
United Conservative	Peter Guthrie	June 9, 2023	February 25, 2025	Smith	
United Conservative	Nathan Neudorf	October 24, 2022	June 9, 2023	Smith	
United Conservative	Nicholas Milliken	June 21, 2022	October 24, 2022	Kenney	Minister of Infrastructure
United Conservative	Prasad Panda	April 30, 2019	June 20, 2022	Kenney	Minister of Infrastructure
New Democratic	Sandra Jansen	October 17, 2017	April 29, 2019	Notley	Minister of Infrastructure
New Democratic	Brian Mason	May 24, 2015	October 16, 2017	Notley	Minister of Infrastructure
Progressive Conservative	Manmeet Bhullar	September 15, 2014	May 23, 2015	Prentice	Minister of Infrastructure
Progressive Conservative	Wayne Drysdale	May 15, 2014	September 14, 2014	Hancock	Minister of Infrastructure
Progressive Conservative	Ric McIver	December 13, 2013	May 6, 2014	Redford, Hancock	Minister of Infrastructure
Progressive Conservative	Wayne Drysdale	May 8, 2012	December 12, 2013	Redford	Minister of Infrastructure
Progressive Conservative	Jeff Johnson	October 12, 2011	May 7, 2012	Redford	Minister of Infrastructure
Progressive Conservative	Ray Danyluk	January 15, 2010	October 11, 2011	Stelmach	Minister of Infrastructure
Progressive Conservative	Jack Hayden	March 13, 2008	January 14, 2010	Stelmach	Minister of Infrastructure
Progressive Conservative	Luke Ouellette	December 15, 2006	March 12, 2008	Stelmach	Minister of Infrastructure and Transportation
Progressive Conservative	Ty Lund	April 6, 2006	December 14, 2006	Klein	Minister of Infrastructure and Transportation
Progressive Conservative	Lyle Oberg	November 25, 2004	March 23, 2006	Klein	Minister of Infrastructure and Transportation
Progressive Conservative	Ty Lund	March 19, 2001	November 24, 2004	Klein	Minister of Infrastructure
Progressive Conservative	Ed Stelmach	May 26, 1999	March 18, 2001	Klein	Minister of Infrastructure
Progressive Conservative	Stan Woloshyn	May 31, 1996	May 25, 1999	Klein	Minister of Public Works, Supply and Services
Progressive Conservative	Robert Fischer	December 21, 1994	May 30, 1996	Klein	Minister of Public Works, Supply and Services
Progressive Conservative	Tom Thurber	June 30, 1993	December 20, 1994	Klein	Minister of Public Works, Supply and Services
Progressive Conservative	Ken Kowalski	April 14, 1989	June 29, 1993	Getty	Minister of Public Works, Supply and Services
Progressive Conservative	Ernie Isley	May 26, 1986	April 13, 1989	Getty	Minister of Public Works, Supply and Services
Progressive Conservative	Tom Chambers	April 24, 1978	May 25, 1986	Lougheed, Getty	Minister of Public Works, Supply and Services (Note: Minister of Housing and Public Works (April 24, 1978–November 18, 1982))
Progressive Conservative	William Yurko	April 3, 1975	April 23, 1978	Lougheed	Minister of Housing and Public Works
Progressive Conservative	Winston Backus	September 10, 1971	April 2, 1975	Lougheed	Minister of Public Works
Social Credit	Albert Ludwig	May 27, 1969	September 9, 1971	Strom	Minister of Public Works
Social Credit	Frederick C. Colborne	November 30, 1962	May 26, 1969	Manning, Strom	Minister of Public Works
Social Credit	James Hartley	August 2, 1955	November 29, 1962	Manning	Minister of Public Works
Social Credit	Alfred Hooke	September 9, 1952	August 1, 1955	Manning	Minister of Public Works
Social Credit	Duncan MacMillan	May 8, 1948	September 8, 1952	Manning	Minister of Public Works
Social Credit	William Fallow	September 3, 1935	May 3, 1948	Aberhart, Manning	Minister of Public Works
United Farmers	John MacLellan	July 14, 1934	September 2, 1935	Reid	Minister of Public Works
United Farmers	Richard Gavin Reid	July 10, 1934	July 13, 1934	Reid	Minister of Public Works
United Farmers	Oran McPherson	December 31, 1926	July 9, 1934	Brownlee	Minister of Public Works
Dominion Labor	Alex Ross	August 13, 1921	December 30, 1926	Greenfield, Brownlee	Minister of Public Works
Liberal	Archibald J. McLean	October 16, 1917	August 12, 1921	Stewart	Minister of Public Works
Liberal	Charles Stewart	December 2, 1913	October 15, 1917	Sifton	Minister of Public Works
Liberal	Charles Richmond Mitchell	May 4, 1912	December 1, 1913	Sifton	Minister of Public Works
Liberal	Arthur Sifton	June 1, 1910	May 3, 1912	Sifton	Minister of Public Works
Liberal	William Henry Cushing	September 8, 1905	February 14, 1910	Rutherford	Minister of Public Works

=== Associate Ministers in the Infrastructure portfolio ===
Affiliation	Name	Date appointed	Date departed	Premier(s)	Title
Progressive Conservative	Gene Zwozdesky	June 27, 2007	March 12, 2008	Stelmach	Associate Minister in charge of Capital Planning
Progressive Conservative	Barry McFarland	April 6, 2006	December 15, 2006	Klein	Associate Minister in charge of Capital Planning

== Minister of Innovation and Science ==
Minister of Innovation and Science
Affiliation	Name	Date appointed	Date departed	Premier(s)	Notes
United Conservative	Nate Glubish	October 24, 2022	Present	Smith	Minister of Technology and Innovation
Vacant
New Democratic	Lori Sigurdson	May 24, 2015	October 21, 2015	Notley	Minister of Innovation, Advanced Education, Jobs, Skills Training, and Labour (Note: On October 21, 2015, the role of Minister of Innovation was merged into the Minister of Economic Development portfolio.)
Vacant
Progressive Conservative	Victor Doerksen	March 19, 2001	August 15, 2006	Klein	
Progressive Conservative	Lorne Taylor	May 26, 1999	March 19, 2001	Klein	
Progressive Conservative	Lorne Taylor	March 26, 1997	May 26, 1999	Klein	Minister without portfolio responsible for science, research, and information technology
Progressive Conservative	Dianne Mirosh	September 21, 1994	March 26, 1997	Klein	Minister without portfolio responsible for science and research
Vacant
Progressive Conservative	Fred Stewart	April 14, 1989	December 14, 1992	Getty	Minister of Technology, Research, and Telecommunications
Progressive Conservative	Leslie Young	May 26, 1986	April 14, 1989	Getty	Minister of Technology, Research, and Telecommunications
Progressive Conservative	David King	February 6, 1986	May 26, 1986	Getty	Minister of Technology, Research, and Telecommunications

== Minister of International and Intergovernmental Relations ==
Minister of Intergovernmental Relations
Affiliation	Name	Date appointed	Date departed	Premier(s)	Notes
United Conservative	Danielle Smith	October 11, 2022	Current	Smith	
United Conservative	Jason Kenney	April 30, 2019	October 10, 2022	Kenney	
New Democratic	Rachel Notley	May 24, 2015	October 22, 2015	Notley	
Progressive Conservative	Jim Prentice	September 15, 2014	May 23, 2015	Prentice	
Progressive Conservative	Cal Dallas	May 8, 2012	September 14, 2014	Redford, Hancock	
Progressive Conservative	Cal Dallas	October 12, 2011	May 7, 2012	Redford	Minister of Intergovernmental, International and Aboriginal Relations
Progressive Conservative	Iris Evans	January 15, 2010	October 11, 2011	Stelmach	
Progressive Conservative	Len Webber	September 17, 2009	January 14, 2010	Stelmach	
Progressive Conservative	Ron Stevens	March 13, 2008	May 15, 2009	Stelmach	
Progressive Conservative	Guy Boutilier	December 15, 2006	March 12, 2008	Stelmach	Minister of International, Intergovernmental and Aboriginal Relations
Progressive Conservative	Gary Mar	April 6, 2006	December 14, 2006	Klein	
Progressive Conservative	Ed Stelmach	November 25, 2004	March 21, 2006	Klein	
Progressive Conservative	Halvar Jonson	March 19, 2001	November 24, 2004	Klein	
Progressive Conservative	Shirley McClellan	May 26, 1999	March 18, 2001	Klein	
Progressive Conservative	Dave Hancock	November 5, 1997	May 25, 1999	Klein	Minister of Intergovernmental and Aboriginal Affairs
Progressive Conservative	Dave Hancock	March 26, 1997	November 4, 1997	Klein	Minister of Federal and Intergovernmental Affairs
Progressive Conservative	Ken Rostad	October 21, 1994	March 25, 1997	Klein	Minister of Federal and Intergovernmental Affairs
Progressive Conservative	Ralph Klein	June 30, 1993	October 20, 1994	Klein	Minister of Federal and Intergovernmental Affairs
Progressive Conservative	Peter Elzinga	December 15, 1992	June 29, 1993	Klein	Minister of Federal and Intergovernmental Affairs
Progressive Conservative	Jim Horsman	November 19, 1982	December 14, 1992	Lougheed, Getty	Minister of Federal and Intergovernmental Affairs
Progressive Conservative	Archibald D. Johnston	March 23, 1979	November 18, 1982	Lougheed	Minister of Federal and Intergovernmental Affairs
Progressive Conservative	Lou Hyndman	April 3, 1975	March 22, 1979	Lougheed	Minister of Federal and Intergovernmental Affairs
Progressive Conservative	Don Getty	September 10, 1971	April 2, 1975	Lougheed	Minister of Federal and Intergovernmental Affairs

=== Associate Minister of International and Intergovernmental Relations ===
Associate Minister of International and Intergovernmental Relations
Affiliation	Name	Date appointed	Date departed	Premier(s)	Notes
Progressive Conservative	Teresa Woo-Paw	May 8, 2012	September 14, 2014	Redford, Hancock	

== Minister of Justice and Attorney General ==
The portfolio of the Minister of Justice was held by the Attorney General from 1905 to 1992.

Minister of Justice
Affiliation	Name	Date appointed	Date departed	Premier(s)	Notes
United Conservative	Mickey Amery	June 9, 2023	Current	Smith	
United Conservative	Tyler Shandro	February 25, 2022	May 29, 2023	Kenney, Smith	
United Conservative	Kaycee Madu	August 25, 2020	February 24, 2022	Kenney	
United Conservative	Doug Schweitzer	April 30, 2019	August 24, 2020	Kenney	
New Democratic	Kathleen Ganley	May 24, 2015	April 29, 2019	Notley	
Progressive Conservative	Jonathan Denis	May 8, 2012	April 25, 2015	Redford, Hancock, Prentice	
Progressive Conservative	Verlyn Olson	February 18, 2011	May 7, 2012	Stelmach, Redford	
Progressive Conservative	Alison Redford	March 13, 2008	February 16, 2011	Stelmach	
Progressive Conservative	Ron Stevens	November 25, 2004	March 12, 2008	Klein	
Progressive Conservative	Dave Hancock	May 26, 1999	November 24, 2004	Klein	
Progressive Conservative	Jon Havelock	March 26, 1997	May 25, 1999	Klein	
Progressive Conservative	Brian Evans	October 21, 1994	March 25, 1997	Klein	
Progressive Conservative	Ken Rostad	June 30, 1993	October 20, 1994	Klein	
Progressive Conservative	Dick Fowler	December 15, 1992	June 29, 1993	Klein	
Progressive Conservative	Ken Rostad	September 8, 1988	December 14, 1992	Getty	Attorney General
Progressive Conservative	Jim Horsman	May 26, 1986	September 7, 1988	Getty	Attorney General
Progressive Conservative	Neil Stanley Crawford	March 23, 1979	May 25, 1986	Lougheed, Getty	Attorney General
Progressive Conservative	James L. Foster	April 3, 1975	March 22, 1979	Lougheed	Attorney General
Progressive Conservative	Merv Leitch	September 10, 1971	April 2, 1975	Lougheed	Attorney General
Social Credit	Edgar Gerhart	May 13, 1968	September 9, 1971	Manning, Strom	Attorney General
Social Credit	Ernest Manning	August 2, 1955	May 12, 1968	Manning	Attorney General
Social Credit	Lucien Maynard	June 1, 1943	August 1, 1955	Manning	Attorney General
Social Credit	William Aberhart	September 15, 1937	May 23, 1943	Aberhart	Attorney General
Social Credit	John Hugill	September 3, 1935	September 14, 1937	Aberhart	Attorney General
United Farmers	John Lymburn	June 5, 1926	September 2, 1935	Reid, Brownlee	Attorney General
United Farmers	John Edward Brownlee	August 13, 1921	June 4, 1926	Greenfield, Brownlee	Attorney General
Liberal	John Robert Boyle	August 24, 1918	August 12, 1921	Stewart	Attorney General
Liberal	Charles Wilson Cross	May 4, 1912	August 23, 1918	Sifton, Stewart	Attorney General
Liberal	Charles Richmond Mitchell	June 1, 1910	May 4, 1912	Sifton	Attorney General
Liberal	Charles Wilson Cross	September 8, 1905	March 9, 1910	Rutherford	Attorney General (Note: Cross resigned on March 9, 1910, in the aftermath of the Alberta and Great Waterways Railway scandal. Premier Rutherford refused Cross's resignation.)

== Minister of Labour ==
Minister of Labour
Affiliation	Name	Date appointed	Date departed	Premier	Notes
United Conservative	Kaycee Madu	February 25, 2022	May 1, 2023	Kenney, Smith	Minister of Labour and Immigration; Minister of Skilled Trades and Professions
United Conservative	Tyler Shandro	September 21, 2021	February 24, 2022	Kenney	Minister of Labour and Immigration
United Conservative	Jason Copping	April 30, 2019	September 20, 2021	Kenney	Minister of Labour and Immigration
New Democratic	Christina Gray	February 2, 2016	April 29, 2019	Notley	
New Democratic	Lori Sigurdson	May 24, 2015	February 1, 2016	Notley	Minister of Jobs, Skills, Training and Labour
Progressive Conservative	Ric McIver	September 15, 2014	May 23, 2015	Prentice	Minister of Jobs, Skills, Training and Labour
Progressive Conservative	Kyle Fawcett	May 26, 2014	September 14, 2014	Dave Hancock	Minister of Jobs, Skills, Training and Labour
Progressive Conservative	Thomas Lukaszuk	December 13, 2013	May 22, 2014	Redford, Hancock	Minister of Jobs, Skills, Training and Labour
Progressive Conservative	Thomas Lukaszuk	January 15, 2010	October 11, 2011	Stelmach	Minister of Employment and Immigration
Progressive Conservative	Hector Goudreau	March 13, 2008	January 14, 2010	Stelmach	Minister of Employment and Immigration
Progressive Conservative	Iris Evans	December 15, 2006	March 12, 2008	Stelmach	Minister of Employment, Immigration and Industry
Progressive Conservative	Mike Cardinal	November 25, 2004	December 14, 2006	Klein	Minister of Human Resources and Employment
Progressive Conservative	Clint Dunford	May 26, 1999	November 24, 2004	Klein	Minister of Human Resources and Employment
Progressive Conservative	Murray Smith	June 10, 1996	May 25, 1999	Klein	
Progressive Conservative	Stockwell Day	December 15, 1992	May 30, 1996	Klein	
Progressive Conservative	Elaine McCoy	April 14, 1989	December 14, 1992	Getty	
Progressive Conservative	Rick Orman	September 8, 1988	April 13, 1989	Getty	
Progressive Conservative	Ian Reid	May 26, 1986	September 7, 1988	Getty	
Progressive Conservative	Leslie Young	March 23, 1979	May 25, 1986	Lougheed	
Progressive Conservative	Neil Stanley Crawford	April 3, 1975	March 22, 1979	Lougheed	
Progressive Conservative	Bert Hohol	June 2, 1972	April 2, 1975	Lougheed	Minister of Manpower and Labour
Progressive Conservative	Bert Hohol	September 10, 1971	June 1, 1972	Lougheed	
Social Credit	Raymond Reierson	September 1, 1959	September 9, 1971	Manning, Strom	
Social Credit	Raymond Reierson	August 2, 1955	August 31, 1959	Manning	Minister of Industries and Labour
Social Credit	Norman Willmore	November 10, 1953	August 1, 1955	Manning	Minister of Industries and Labour
Social Credit	John Lyle Robinson	May 8, 1948	October 29, 1953	Manning	Minister of Industries and Labour

== Minister of Municipal Affairs ==
Minister of Municipal Affairs
Affiliation	Name	Date appointed	Date departed	Premier(s)	Notes
United Conservative	Dan Williams	May 16, 2025	current	Smith	
United Conservative	Ric McIver	June 9, 2023	May 13, 2025	Smith	
United Conservative	Rebecca Schulz	October 24, 2022	June 9, 2023	Smith	
United Conservative	Ric McIver	January 5, 2021	October 24, 2022	Kenney	
United Conservative	Tracy Allard	August 25, 2020	January 4, 2021	Kenney	
United Conservative	Kaycee Madu	April 30, 2019	August 24, 2020	Kenney	
New Democratic	Shaye Anderson	January 19, 2017	April 29, 2019	Notley	
New Democratic	Danielle Larivee	October 22, 2015	January 18, 2017	Notley	
New Democratic	Deron Bilous	May 24, 2015	October 21, 2015	Notley	
Progressive Conservative	Diana McQueen	September 15, 2014	May 23, 2015	Prentice	
Progressive Conservative	Greg Weadick	May 15, 2014	September 14, 2014	Hancock	
Progressive Conservative	Ken Hughes	December 13, 2013	April 7, 2014	Redford, Hancock	
Progressive Conservative	Doug Griffiths	October 12, 2011	December 12, 2013	Redford	
Progressive Conservative	Hector Goudreau	January 19, 2010	October 11, 2011	Stelmach	
Progressive Conservative	Ray Danyluk	December 15, 2006	January 18, 2010	Stelmach	(Note: Minister of Municipal Affairs and Housing (December 15, 2006–March 12, 2008))
Progressive Conservative	Rob Renner	November 25, 2004	December 14, 2006	Klein	
Progressive Conservative	Guy Boutilier	March 19, 2001	November 24, 2004	Klein	
Progressive Conservative	Walter Paszkowski	May 26, 1999	March 18, 2001	Klein	
Progressive Conservative	Iris Evans	March 26, 1997	May 25, 1999	Klein	
Progressive Conservative	Tom Thurber	December 21, 1994	March 25, 1997	Klein	
Progressive Conservative	Steve West	December 15, 1992	December 20, 1994	Klein	
Progressive Conservative	Dick Fowler	February 24, 1992	December 14, 1992	Getty	
Progressive Conservative	Raymond Speaker	April 14, 1989	January 3, 1992	Getty	
Progressive Conservative	Dennis Anderson	September 10, 1987	April 13, 1989	Getty	
Progressive Conservative	Neil Stanley Crawford	May 26, 1986	September 9, 1987	Getty	
Progressive Conservative	Julian Koziak	November 19, 1982	May 25, 1986	Lougheed, Getty	
Progressive Conservative	Marvin Moore	March 23, 1979	November 18, 1982	Lougheed	
Progressive Conservative	Archibald D. Johnston	April 3, 1975	March 22, 1979	Lougheed	
Progressive Conservative	David John Russell	September 10, 1971	April 2, 1975	Lougheed	
Social Credit	Frederick C. Colborne	May 27, 1969	September 9, 1971	Strom	
Social Credit	Edgar Gerhart	December 12, 1968	May 26, 1969	Strom	
Social Credit	Harry Strom	July 16, 1968	December 11, 1968	Manning	
Social Credit	Edgar Gerhart	June 29, 1967	July 15, 1968	Manning	
Social Credit	Alfred Hooke	August 2, 1955	June 28, 1967	Manning	
Social Credit	Ted Hinman	December 23, 1954	August 1, 1955	Manning	
Social Credit	Clarence Gerhart	June 1, 1943	December 22, 1954	Manning	
Social Credit	Lucien Maynard	January 20, 1937	May 23, 1943	Aberhart	
Social Credit	Charles Cockroft	September 3, 1935	January 19, 1937	Aberhart	
United Farmers	Hugh Allen	July 10, 1934	September 2, 1935	Reid	
United Farmers	Richard Gavin Reid	November 23, 1925	July 9, 1934	Brownlee	
United Farmers	Herbert Greenfield	November 3, 1923	November 22, 1925	Greenfield	
United Farmers	Richard Gavin Reid	August 13, 1921	November 2, 1923	Greenfield	
Liberal	Charles Richmond Mitchell	April 29, 1920	August 12, 1921	Stewart	
Liberal	Alexander Grant MacKay	August 26, 1918	April 25, 1920	Stewart	
Liberal	Wilfrid Gariépy	November 28, 1913	August 25, 1918	Sifton, Stewart	
Liberal	Charles Stewart	May 4, 1912	November 27, 1913	Sifton	
Liberal	Archibald J. McLean	December 20, 1911	May 3, 1912	Sifton	

== Minister of Seniors ==
Minister of Seniors
Affiliation	Name	Date appointed	Date departed	Premier(s)	Notes
United Conservative	Jeremy Nixon	October 24, 2022	Incumbent	Smith	Minister of Seniors, Community and Social Services
United Conservative	Josephine Pon	April 30, 2019	October 24, 2022	Kenney	Minister of Seniors and Housing
New Democratic	Lori Sigurdson	February 2, 2016	April 29, 2019	Notley	Minister of Seniors and Housing
New Democratic	Sarah Hoffman	May 24, 2015	February 1, 2016	Notley	Minister of Seniors
Progressive Conservative	Jeff Johnson	September 15, 2014	May 23, 2015	Prentice	Minister of Seniors
Vacant
Progressive Conservative	George VanderBurg	October 12, 2011	May 7, 2012	Redford	Minister of Seniors
Progressive Conservative	Mary Anne Jablonski	March 13, 2008	October 11, 2011	Stelmach	Minister of Seniors and Community Supports
Progressive Conservative	Greg Melchin	December 15, 2006	March 12, 2008	Stelmach	Minister of Seniors and Community Supports
Progressive Conservative	Yvonne Fritz	November 25, 2004	December 14, 2006	Klein	Minister of Seniors and Community Supports
Progressive Conservative	Stan Woloshyn	March 19, 2001	November 24, 2004	Klein	Minister of Seniors
Vacant
Progressive Conservative	Roy Brassard	September 4, 1991	December 14, 1992	Getty	Minister Responsible for Seniors

=== Associate Ministers in the Seniors Portfolio ===
Associate Ministers in the Seniors Portfolio
Affiliation	Name	Date appointed	Date departed	Premier(s)	Notes
Progressive Conservative	Dave Quest	December 13, 2013	September 14, 2014	Redford, Hancock	Associate Minister for Seniors
Progressive Conservative	George VanderBurg	May 8, 2012	December 12, 2013	Redford	Associate Minister of Seniors

== Minister of Service Alberta ==
Minister of Service Alberta
Affiliation	Name	Date appointed	Date departed	Premier(s)	Notes
United Conservative	Dale Nally	October 24, 2022	Current	Smith	Minister of Service Alberta and Red Tape Reduction
United Conservative	Nate Glubish	April 30, 2019	October 24, 2022	Kenney	Minister of Service Alberta
New Democratic	Brian Malkinson	June 18, 2018	April 29, 2019	Notley	Minister of Service Alberta
New Democratic	Stephanie McLean	February 2, 2016	June 17, 2018	Notley	Minister of Service Alberta
New Democratic	Danielle Larivee	October 22, 2015	February 1, 2016	Notley	Minister of Service Alberta
New Democratic	Deron Bilous	May 24, 2015	October 21, 2015	Notley	Minister of Service Alberta
Progressive Conservative	Stephen Khan	September 15, 2014	May 23, 2015	Prentice	Minister of Service Alberta
Progressive Conservative	Doug Griffiths	December 13, 2013	September 14, 2014	Redford, Hancock	Minister of Service Alberta
Progressive Conservative	Manmeet Bhullar	October 12, 2011	December 12, 2013	Redford	Minister of Service Alberta
Progressive Conservative	Heather Klimchuk	March 13, 2008	October 11, 2011	Stelmach	Minister of Service Alberta
Progressive Conservative	Lloyd Snelgrove	December 15, 2006	March 12, 2008	Stelmach	Minister of Service Alberta
Progressive Conservative	George VanderBurg	April 6, 2006	December 14, 2006	Klein	Minister of Government Services
Progressive Conservative	Ty Lund	November 25, 2004	April 5, 2006	Klein	Minister of Government Services
Progressive Conservative	David Coutts	March 19, 2001	November 24, 2004	Klein	Minister of Government Services
Progressive Conservative	Pat Nelson	May 26, 1999	March 18, 2001	Klein	Minister of Government Services
Vacant
Progressive Conservative	Stewart McCrae	March 23, 1979	November 18, 1982	Lougheed	Minister of Government Services
Progressive Conservative	Horst Schmid	April 3, 1975	March 22, 1979	Lougheed	Minister of Government Services

== Solicitor General ==
Solicitor General
Affiliation	Name	Date appointed	Date departed	Premier(s)	Notes
Vacant
United Conservative	Tyler Shandro	February 25, 2022	October 24, 2022	Kenney	Minister of Justice and Solicitor General
United Conservative	Kaycee Madu	August 25, 2020	February 24, 2022	Kenney	Minister of Justice and Solicitor General
United Conservative	Doug Schweitzer	April 30, 2019	August 24, 2020	Kenney	Minister of Justice and Solicitor General
New Democratic	Kathleen Ganley	May 24, 2015	April 29, 2019	Notley	Minister of Justice and Solicitor General (Note: Minister of Justice, Solicitor General and Aboriginal Affairs (May 24, 2015–February 2, 2016))
Progressive Conservative	Jonathan Denis	October 12, 2011	April 25, 2015	Redford, Hancock, Prentice	Solicitor General and Minister of Public Security (Note: Minister of Justice and Solicitor General (September 15, 2014–April 25, 2015))
Progressive Conservative	Frank Oberle Jr.	January 15, 2010	October 11, 2011	Stelmach	Solicitor General and Minister of Public Security
Progressive Conservative	Fred Lindsay	December 15, 2006	January 14, 2010	Stelmach	Solicitor General and Minister of Public Security
Progressive Conservative	Harvey Cenaiko	November 25, 2004	December 14, 2006	Klein	Solicitor General (Note: Solicitor General and Minister of Public Security (June 2, 2005–December 14, 2006))
Progressive Conservative	Heather Forsyth	March 19, 2001	November 24, 2004	Klein	Solicitor General
Vacant
Progressive Conservative	Steve West	February 24, 1992	December 14, 1992	Getty	Solicitor General
Progressive Conservative	Dick Fowler	April 14, 1989	February 23, 1992	Getty	Solicitor General
Progressive Conservative	Marvin Moore	September 8, 1988	April 13, 1989	Getty	Solicitor General
Progressive Conservative	Ken Rostad	May 26, 1986	September 7, 1988	Getty	Solicitor General
Progressive Conservative	Ian Reid	January 31, 1984	May 25, 1986	Lougheed, Getty	Solicitor General
Progressive Conservative	Graham Harle	March 23, 1979	November 15, 1983	Lougheed	Solicitor General
Progressive Conservative	Roy Farran	April 3, 1975	March 22, 1979	Lougheed	Solicitor General
Progressive Conservative	Helen Hunley	September 11, 1973	April 2, 1975	Lougheed	Solicitor General

== Minister of Sustainable Resource Development ==
Minister of Sustainable Resource Development
Affiliation	Name	Date appointed	Date departed	Premier(s)	Notes
Vacant
Progressive Conservative	Kyle Fawcett	September 15, 2014	May 24, 2015	Prentice	Minister of Environment and Sustainable Resource Development
Progressive Conservative	Diana McQueen	May 8, 2012	September 15, 2014	Hancock, Redford	
Progressive Conservative	Frank Oberle	October 12, 2011	May 8, 2012	Redford	
Progressive Conservative	Mel Knight	January 15, 2010	October 12, 2011	Stelmach	
Progressive Conservative	Ted Morton	December 15, 2006	January 15, 2010	Stelmach	
Progressive Conservative	David Coutts	November 25, 2004	December 15, 2006	Klein	
Progressive Conservative	Mike Cardinal	March 16, 2001	November 25, 2004	Klein	

== Minister of Telephones ==
Minister of Telephones
Affiliation	Name	Date appointed	Date departed	Premier(s)	Notes
Vacant
Progressive Conservative	Fred Stewart	April 14, 1989	December 14, 1992	Getty	Minister of Technology, Research and Telecommunications
Progressive Conservative	Leslie Young	May 26, 1986	April 13, 1989	Getty	Minister of Technology, Research and Telecommunications
Progressive Conservative	David Thomas King	February 6, 1986	May 25, 1986	Getty	Minister of Technology, Research and Telecommunications
Progressive Conservative	Robert Bogle	November 19, 1982	February 5, 1986	Lougheed, Getty	Minister of Utilities and Telecommunications
Progressive Conservative	Larry Shaben	March 23, 1979	November 18, 1982	Lougheed	Minister of Utilities and Telephones
Progressive Conservative	Allan Warrack	April 3, 1975	March 22, 1979	Lougheed	Minister of Utilities and Telephones
Progressive Conservative	Roy Farran	March 6, 1973	April 2, 1975	Lougheed	Minister of Telephones and Utilities
Progressive Conservative	Len Werry	September 10, 1971	February 25, 1973	Lougheed	Minister of Telephones
Social Credit	Raymond Reierson	December 12, 1968	September 9, 1971	Strom	Minister of Telephones
Social Credit	Anders Aalborg	July 13, 1967	December 11, 1968	Manning	Minister of Telephones
Social Credit	Raymond Reierson	September 22, 1959	July 12, 1967	Manning	Minister of Telephones
Social Credit	Gordon Taylor	December 27, 1950	September 21, 1959	Manning	Minister of Railways and Telephones
Social Credit	Duncan MacMillan	May 8, 1948	December 26, 1950	Manning	Minister of Railways and Telephones
Social Credit	William Fallow	September 3, 1935	May 3, 1948	Aberhart, Manning	Minister of Railways and Telephones
United Farmers	George Hoadley	June 2, 1934	September 2, 1935	Brownlee, Reid	Minister of Railways and Telephones
United Farmers	Vernor Smith	August 13, 1921	July 19, 1932	Greenfield, Brownlee	Minister of Railways and Telephones
Liberal	Charles Stewart	October 16, 1917	August 12, 1921	Stewart	Minister of Railways and Telephones
Liberal	Arthur Sifton	December 20, 1911	October 15, 1917	Sifton	Minister of Railways and Telephones

=== Associate Ministers in the Telephone Portfolio ===
Associate Ministers in the Telephone Portfolio
Affiliation	Name	Date appointed	Date departed	Premier(s)	Notes
Progressive Conservative	Neil Webber	March 23, 1979	November 18, 1982	Lougheed	Associate Minister of Telephones

== Minister of Tourism ==
Minister of Tourism
Affiliation	Name	Date appointed	Date departed	Premier(s)	Notes
United Conservative	Andrew Boitchenko	May 16, 2025	Current	Smith	Minister of Tourism and Sport
United Conservative	Joseph Schow	June 9, 2023	May 16, 2025	Smith	Minister of Tourism and Sport
United Conservative	Todd Loewen	October 24, 2022	June 9, 2023	Smith	Minister of Forestry, Parks and Tourism
Vacant
United Conservative	Tanya Fir	April 30, 2019	August 24, 2020	Kenney	Minister of Economic Development, Trade and Tourism
New Democratic	Ricardo Miranda	February 2, 2016	April 29, 2019	Notley	Minister of Culture and Tourism
New Democratic	David Eggen	May 24, 2015	February 1, 2016	Notley	Minister of Culture and Tourism
Progressive Conservative	Maureen Kubinec	September 15, 2014	May 23, 2015	Prentice	Minister of Culture and Tourism
Progressive Conservative	Richard Starke	February 8, 2013	September 14, 2014	Redford, Hancock	Minister of Tourism, Parks and Recreation
Progressive Conservative	Christine Cusanelli	May 15, 2012	February 7, 2013	Redford	Minister of Tourism, Parks and Recreation
Progressive Conservative	Jack Hayden	October 12, 2011	May 7, 2012	Redford	Minister of Tourism, Parks and Recreation
Progressive Conservative	Cindy Ady	March 13, 2008	October 11, 2011	Stelmach	Minister of Tourism, Parks and Recreation
Progressive Conservative	Hector Goudreau	December 15, 2006	March 12, 2008	Stelmach	Minister of Tourism, Parks, Recreation and Culture
Progressive Conservative	Pat Nelson	March 26, 1997	August 11, 1997	Klein	Minister of Economic Development and Tourism
Progressive Conservative	Steve West	May 31, 1996	March 25, 1997	Klein	Minister of Economic Development and Tourism
Progressive Conservative	Murray Smith	June 1, 1995	May 30, 1996	Klein	Minister of Economic Development and Tourism
Progressive Conservative	Ralph Klein	October 21, 1994	May 31, 1995	Klein	Minister of Economic Development and Tourism
Progressive Conservative	Ken Kowalski	June 30, 1993	October 20, 1994	Klein	Minister of Economic Development and Tourism
Progressive Conservative	Donald H. Sparrow	September 10, 1987	June 29, 1993	Getty, Klein	Minister of Tourism (Note: Minister of Tourism, Parks and Recreation (February 24, 1992–December 14, 1992) Minister of Economic Development and Tourism (December 15, 1992–June 29, 1993))
Progressive Conservative	LeRoy Fjordbotten	May 26, 1986	September 9, 1987	Getty	Minister of Tourism
Progressive Conservative	Horst Schmid	February 6, 1986	May 25, 1986	Getty	Minister of Tourism
Progressive Conservative	Al Adair	March 23, 1979	February 5, 1986	Lougheed	Minister of Tourism and Small Business
Progressive Conservative	Robert Wagner Dowling	April 3, 1975	March 22, 1979	Lougheed	Minister of Business Development and Tourism
Vacant
Progressive Conservative	Fred Peacock	September 10, 1971	June 1, 1972	Lougheed	Minister of Industry and Tourism
Social Credit	Raymond Ratzlaff	May 27, 1969	September 9, 1971	Strom	Minister of Industry and Tourism
Social Credit	Allen Russell Patrick	May 2, 1968	May 26, 1969	Manning, Strom	Minister of Industry and Tourism

=== Associate Ministers in the Tourism portfolio ===
Affiliation	Name	Date appointed	Date departed	Premier(s)	Title
Progressive Conservative	Cindy Ady	June 27, 2007	March 12, 2008	Stelmach	Associate Minister in charge of Tourism Promotion

== Minister of Trade ==
The modern ministry of Minister of Trade, Immigration and Multiculturalism was created in 2022. For previous ministries with similar titles see "economic development" and "international trade".

Minister of Trade
Affiliation	Name	Date appointed	Date departed	Premier(s)	Notes
United Conservative	Rajan Sawhney	October 24, 2022	Incumbent	Smith	Minister of Trade, Immigration and Multiculturalism

== Minister of Transportation ==
Minister of Transportation
Affiliation	Name	Date appointed	Date departed	Premier(s)	Notes
United Conservative	Devin Dreeshen	October 24, 2022	Current	Smith	Minister of Transportation and Economic Corridors
United Conservative	Prasad Panda	June 21, 2022	October 24, 2022	Kenney	Minister of Transportation
United Conservative	Rajan Sawhney	July 8, 2021	June 13, 2022	Kenney	Minister of Transportation
United Conservative	Ric McIver	April 30, 2019	July 7, 2021	Kenney	Minister of Transportation
New Democratic	Brian Mason	May 24, 2015	April 29, 2019	Notley	Minister of Transportation (Note: Minister of Infrastructure and Transportation (May 24, 2015–October 17, 2017))
Progressive Conservative	Wayne Drysdale	December 13, 2013	May 24, 2015	Redford, Hancock, Prentice	Minister of Transportation
Progressive Conservative	Ric McIver	May 8, 2012	December 12, 2013	Redford	Minister of Transportation
Progressive Conservative	Ray Danyluk	October 12, 2011	May 7, 2012	Redford	Minister of Transportation
Progressive Conservative	Luke Ouellette	December 15, 2006	October 11, 2011	Stelmach	Minister of Transportation (Note: Minister of Infrastructure and Transportation (December 15, 2006–March 12, 2008))
Progressive Conservative	Ty Lund	April 6, 2006	December 14, 2006	Klein	Minister of Infrastructure and Transportation
Progressive Conservative	Lyle Oberg	November 25, 2004	March 23, 2006	Klein	Minister of Infrastructure and Transportation
Progressive Conservative	Ed Stelmach	March 19, 2001	November 24, 2004	Klein	Minister of Transportation
Progressive Conservative	Walter Paszkowski	March 26, 1997	May 25, 1999	Klein	Minister of Transportation and Utilities
Progressive Conservative	Robert Fischer	May 31, 1996	March 25, 1997	Klein	Minister of Transportation and Utilities
Progressive Conservative	Steve West	December 21, 1994	May 30, 1996	Klein	Minister of Transportation and Utilities
Progressive Conservative	Peter Trynchy	December 15, 1992	December 15, 1994	Klein	Minister of Transportation and Utilities
Progressive Conservative	Al Adair	May 26, 1986	December 14, 1992	Getty	Minister of Transportation and Utilities
Progressive Conservative	Marvin Moore	November 19, 1982	May 25, 1986	Lougheed, Getty	Minister of Transportation
Progressive Conservative	Henry Kroeger	March 23, 1979	November 18, 1982	Lougheed	Minister of Transportation
Progressive Conservative	Hugh Horner	April 3, 1975	March 22, 1979	Lougheed	Minister of Transportation
Progressive Conservative	Clarence Copithorne	September 10, 1971	April 2, 1975	Lougheed	Minister of Highways and Transport
Social Credit	Gordon Taylor	May 1, 1951	September 9, 1971	Manning, Strom	Minister of Highways
Social Credit	Gordon Taylor	December 27, 1950	September 21, 1959	Manning	Minister of Railways and Telephones
Social Credit	Duncan MacMillan	May 8, 1948	December 26, 1950	Manning	Minister of Railways and Telephones
Social Credit	William Fallow	September 3, 1935	May 3, 1948	Aberhart, Manning	Minister of Railways and Telephones
United Farmers	George Hoadley	June 2, 1934	September 2, 1935	Brownlee, Reid	Minister of Railways and Telephones
United Farmers	Vernor Smith	August 13, 1921	July 19, 1932	Greenfield, Brownlee	Minister of Railways and Telephones
Liberal	Charles Stewart	October 16, 1917	August 12, 1921	Stewart	Minister of Railways and Telephones
Liberal	Arthur Sifton	December 20, 1911	October 15, 1917	Sifton	Minister of Railways and Telephones
Liberal	Alexander Rutherford	November 1, 1909	May 26, 1910	Rutherford	Minister of Railways

=== Associate Ministers in the Transportation Portfolio ===
Associate Ministers in the Transportation Portfolio
Affiliation	Name	Date appointed	Date departed	Premier(s)	Notes
Progressive Conservative	Barry McFarland	April 6, 2006	December 14, 2006	Klein	Associate Minister of Infrastructure and Transportation

== Minister of Utilities ==
Minister of Utilities
Affiliation	Name	Date appointed	Date departed	Premier(s)	Notes
United Conservative	Nathan Neudorf	June 9, 2023	Current	Smith	Minister of Affordability and Utilities
United Conservative	Matt Jones	October 24, 2022	June 9, 2023	Smith	Minister of Affordability and Utilities
Vacant
Progressive Conservative	Walter Paszkowski	March 26, 1997	May 25, 1999	Klein	Minister of Transportation and Utilities
Progressive Conservative	Robert Fischer	May 31, 1996	March 25, 1997	Klein	Minister of Transportation and Utilities
Progressive Conservative	Steve West	December 21, 1994	May 30, 1996	Klein	Minister of Transportation and Utilities
Progressive Conservative	Peter Trynchy	December 15, 1992	December 15, 1994	Klein	Minister of Transportation and Utilities
Progressive Conservative	Al Adair	May 26, 1986	December 14, 1992	Getty	Minister of Transportation and Utilities
Progressive Conservative	Robert Bogle	November 19, 1982	May 25, 1986	Lougheed; Getty	Minister of Utilities and Telecommunications (Note: Minister of Utilities (February 6, 1986–May 25, 1986))
Progressive Conservative	Larry Shaben	March 23, 1979	November 18, 1982	Lougheed	Minister of Utilities and Telephones
Progressive Conservative	Allan Warrack	April 3, 1975	March 22, 1979	Lougheed	Minister of Utilities and Telephones
Progressive Conservative	Roy Farran	March 6, 1973	April 2, 1975	Lougheed	Minister of Telephones and Utilities

== Minister without Portfolio ==
Minister without Portfolio
Affiliation	Name	Date appointed	Date departed	Premier(s)	Notes
United Conservative	Brad Rutherford	June 21, 2022	October 24, 2022	Kenney	Minister Without Portfolio
Progressive Conservative	Lorne Taylor	March 26, 1997	May 25, 1999	Klein	Minister Responsible for Science, Research and Information Technology
Progressive Conservative	Pearl Calahasen	May 31, 1996	May 25, 1999	Klein	Minister without portfolio responsible for children's services
Progressive Conservative	Murray Smith	December 21, 1994	May 31, 1995	Klein	Minister Without Portfolio
Progressive Conservative	Dianne Mirosh	September 21, 1994	March 25, 1997	Klein	Minister Responsible for Science and Research
Progressive Conservative	Dianne Mirosh	June 30, 1993	September 20, 1994	Klein	Responsible for the Alberta Alcohol and Drug Abuse Commission
Progressive Conservative	Peter Trynchy	April 14, 1989	December 14, 1992	Getty	Minister Responsible for Occupational Health and Safety, and Workers' Compensation Board
Progressive Conservative	Milt Pahl	November 19, 1982	May 25, 1986	Lougheed, Getty	Minister Responsible for Native Affairs
Progressive Conservative	William Edward Payne	November 19, 1982	May 25, 1986	Lougheed, Getty	
Progressive Conservative	Don McCrimmon	March 23, 1979	November 18, 1982	Lougheed	Minister Responsible for Native Affairs
Progressive Conservative	Greg Stevens	March 23, 1979	May 25, 1986	Lougheed	Minister Responsible for Personnel Administration
Progressive Conservative	Bill Diachuk	March 23, 1979	May 25, 1986	Lougheed	Minister Responsible for Workers' Health, Safety and Compensation
Progressive Conservative	Stewart McCrae	April 3, 1975	March 22, 1979	Lougheed	Responsible for Calgary affairs
Progressive Conservative	Dallas Schmidt	April 3, 1975	August 29, 1976	Lougheed	
Progressive Conservative	Robert Bogle	April 3, 1975	March 22, 1977	Lougheed	Minister Without Portfolio, responsible for Native Affairs
Progressive Conservative	Al Adair	September 10, 1971	April 2, 1975	Lougheed	Minister Without Portfolio
Progressive Conservative	Robert Wagner Dowling	September 10, 1971	March 5, 1973	Lougheed	Minister Without Portfolio
Progressive Conservative	Helen Hunley	September 10, 1971	September 10, 1973	Lougheed	Minister Without Portfolio
Progressive Conservative	George Topolnisky	September 10, 1971	April 2, 1975	Lougheed	Minister Without Portfolio
Social Credit	Raymond Speaker	June 29, 1967	July 15, 1968	Manning	Minister Without Portfolio
Social Credit	Adolph Fimrite	July 4, 1966	September 9, 1971	Manning, Strom	Minister Without Portfolio
Social Credit	Ira McLaughlin	November 30, 1962	July 3, 1966	Manning	Minister Without Portfolio
Social Credit	Ethel Sylvia Wilson	November 30, 1962	September 9, 1971	Manning, Strom	Minister Without Portfolio
Social Credit	Frederick C. Colborne	August 2, 1955	November 29, 1962	Manning	Minister Without Portfolio
Social Credit	Solon Earl Low	September 12, 1944	June 30, 1945	Manning	Minister Without Portfolio
Social Credit	Lucien Maynard	May 12, 1936	January 19, 1937	Aberhart	Minister Without Portfolio
United Farmers	Irene Parlby	August 13, 1921	August 21, 1935	Greenfield, Brownlee, Reid	Minister Without Portfolio
Liberal	William Ashbury Buchanan	November 1, 1909	March 8, 1910	Rutherford	Minister Without Portfolio
Liberal	Prosper-Edmond Lessard	November 1, 1909	May 26, 1910	Rutherford	Minister Without Portfolio
Liberal	Leverett George DeVeber	September 9, 1905	March 8, 1906	Rutherford	Minister Without Portfolio

== Minister of Career Development and Employment ==
Minister of Career Development and Employment
Affiliation	Name	Date appointed	Date departed	Premier(s)	Notes
Progressive Conservative	Norm Weiss	September 18, 1989	December 14, 1992	Getty	
Progressive Conservative	Connie Osterman	April 14, 1989	July 28, 1989	Getty	
Progressive Conservative	Ken Kowalski	September 8, 1988	April 14, 1989	Getty	
Progressive Conservative	Rick Orman	September 12, 1986	September 8, 1988	Getty	

== Minister of Community Development ==
Minister of Community Development
Affiliation	Name	Date appointed	Date departed	Premier(s)	Notes
Progressive Conservative	Denis Ducharme	April 6, 2006	December 15, 2006	Klein	
Progressive Conservative	Gary Mar	November 25, 2004	April 6, 2006	Klein	
Progressive Conservative	Gene Zwozdesky	March 16, 2001	November 25, 2004	Klein	
Progressive Conservative	Stan Woloshyn	May 26, 1999	March 16, 2001	Klein	
Progressive Conservative	Shirley McClellan	May 31, 1996	May 26, 1999	Klein	
Progressive Conservative	Gary Mar	June 30, 1993	May 31, 1996	Klein	
Progressive Conservative	Dianne Mirosh	December 14, 1992	June 30, 1993	Klein	

== Minister of Community and Occupational Health ==
Minister of Community and Occupational Health
Affiliation	Name	Date appointed	Date departed	Premier(s)	Notes
Progressive Conservative	Peter Trynchy	April 14, 1989	December 14, 1992	Getty	Minister Responsible for Occupational Health and Safety, and Workers' Compensation Board
Progressive Conservative	Jim Dinning	May 26, 1986	September 8, 1988	Getty	
Progressive Conservative	Bill Diachuk	March 23, 1979	May 26, 1986	Getty, Lougheed	Minister Responsible for Workers' Health, Safety and Compensation

== Minister of Consumer and Corporate Affairs ==
Minister of Consumer and Corporate Affairs
Affiliation	Name	Date appointed	Date departed	Premier(s)	Notes
Progressive Conservative	Dennis Anderson	April 14, 1989	December 14, 1992	Getty	
Progressive Conservative	Elaine McCoy	May 26, 1986	April 14, 1989	Getty	
Progressive Conservative	Al Adair	February 6, 1985	May 26, 1986	Getty	
Progressive Conservative	Connie Osterman	November 19, 1982	February 6, 1985	Lougheed	
Progressive Conservative	Julian Koziak	March 23, 1979	November 19, 1982	Lougheed	
Progressive Conservative	Graham Harle	April 3, 1975	March 23, 1979	Lougheed	
Progressive Conservative	Robert Dowling	March 6, 1973	April 3, 1975	Lougheed	Minister of Consumer Affairs

== Minister of Gaming ==
Minister of Gaming
Affiliation	Name	Date appointed	Date departed	Premier(s)	Notes
Progressive Conservative	Gordon Graydon	November 25, 2004	December 15, 2006	Klein	
Progressive Conservative	Ron Stevens	March 16, 2001	November 25, 2004	Klein	
Progressive Conservative	Murray Smith	May 26, 1999	March 16, 2001	Klein	

== Minister of Health ==
Minister of Health
Affiliation	Name	Date appointed	Date departed	Premier(s)	Notes
United Conservative	Adriana LaGrange	September 21, 2021	May 16, 2025	Smith	Minister of Health
United Conservative	Jason Copping	September 21, 2021	May 29, 2023	Kenney, Smith	Minister of Health
United Conservative	Tyler Shandro	April 30, 2019	September 20, 2021	Kenney	Minister of Health
New Democratic	Sarah Hoffman	May 24, 2015	April 29, 2019	Notley	Minister of Health
Progressive Conservative	Stephen Mandel	September 15, 2014	May 23, 2015	Prentice	Minister of Health
Progressive Conservative	Fred Horne	October 12, 2011	September 14, 2014	Redford, Hancock	Minister of Health
Progressive Conservative	Gene Zwozdesky	January 15, 2010	October 11, 2011	Stelmach	Minister of Health and Wellness
Progressive Conservative	Ron Liepert	March 13, 2008	January 14, 2010	Stelmach	Minister of Health and Wellness
Progressive Conservative	Dave Hancock	December 15, 2006	March 12, 2008	Stelmach	Minister of Health and Wellness
Progressive Conservative	Iris Evans	November 25, 2004	December 14, 2006	Klein	Minister of Health and Wellness
Progressive Conservative	Gary Mar	June 7, 2000	November 24, 2004	Klein	Minister of Health and Wellness
Progressive Conservative	Halvar Jonson	May 31, 1996	June 6, 2000	Klein	Minister of Health and Wellness
Progressive Conservative	Shirley McClellan	December 15, 1992	May 30, 1996	Klein	Minister of Health
Progressive Conservative	Nancy MacBeth	September 8, 1988	December 14, 1992	Getty	Minister of Health
Progressive Conservative	Marvin Moore	May 26, 1986	September 7, 1988	Getty	Minister of Hospitals and Medical Care
Progressive Conservative	David John Russell	March 23, 1979	May 25, 1986	Lougheed, Getty	Minister of Hospitals and Medical Care
Progressive Conservative	Gordon Miniely	April 3, 1975	March 22, 1979	Lougheed	Minister of Hospitals and Medical Care
Progressive Conservative	Neil Stanley Crawford	September 10, 1971	April 2, 1975	Lougheed	Minister of Health and Social Development
Social Credit	Raymond Speaker	April 28, 1971	September 9, 1971	Strom	Minister of Health and Social Development
Social Credit	James Douglas Henderson	May 20, 1969	April 27, 1971	Strom	Minister of Health
Social Credit	Joseph Donovan Ross	September 18, 1957	May 19, 1969	Manning, Strom	Minister of Health (Note: Minister of Public Health (1957–1967))
Social Credit	Wallace Warren Cross	September 3, 1935	September 17, 1957	Aberhart, Manning	Minister of Public Health
United Farmers	George Hoadley	November 3, 1923	September 2, 1935	Greenfield, Brownlee, Reid	Minister of Public Health
United Farmers	Richard Gavin Reid	August 13, 1921	November 2, 1923	Greenfield	Minister of Public Health
Liberal	Charles Richmond Mitchell	April 29, 1920	August 12, 1921	Stewart	Minister of Public Health
Liberal	Alexander Grant MacKay	July 22, 1919	April 25, 1920	Stewart	Minister of Public Health

=== Associate Ministers in the Health Portfolio ===
Associate Ministers in the Health Portfolio
Affiliation	Name	Date appointed	Date departed	Premier(s)	Notes
United Conservative	Mike Ellis	July 8, 2021	October 24, 2022	Kenney	Associate Minister of Mental Health and Addictions
United Conservative	Jason Luan	April 30, 2019	July 7, 2021	Kenney	Associate Minister of Mental Health and Addictions
New Democratic	Brandy Payne	February 2, 2016	June 17, 2018	Notley	Associate Minister of Health
Progressive Conservative	Gene Zwozdesky	May 26, 1999	March 18, 2001	Klein	Associate Minister of Health and Wellness

== Minister of International Trade ==
Minister of International Trade
Affiliation	Name	Date appointed	Date departed	Premier(s)	Notes
Progressive Conservative	Horst Schmid	November 19, 1982	February 5, 1986	Lougheed, Getty	
Progressive Conservative	Horst Schmid	March 23, 1979	November 19, 1982	Lougheed	Minister of State for Economic Development - International Trade

== Minister of Mines and Minerals ==
Minister of Mines and Minerals
Affiliation	Name	Date appointed	Date departed	Premier(s)	Notes
Progressive Conservative	Bill Dickie	September 10, 1971	March 1975	Lougheed	
Social Credit	Allen Patrick	October 15, 1962	September 10, 1971	Strom, Manning	
Social Credit	Ernest Manning	September 16, 1952	October 15, 1962	Manning	
Social Credit	Nathan Tanner	April 1, 1949	September 16, 1952	Manning	

== Provincial Secretary ==
Provincial Secretary
Affiliation	Name	Date appointed	Date departed	Premier(s)	Notes
In 1971, the provincial secretary portfolio was merged into the Attorney General portfolio.
Social Credit	Ambrose Holowach	October 15, 1962	September 9, 1971	Manning, Strom	
Social Credit	Allen Russell Patrick	September 1, 1959	October 14, 1962	Manning	
Social Credit	Alfred Hooke	August 2, 1955	August 31, 1959	Manning	
Social Credit	Clarence Gerhart	May 8, 1948	August 1, 1955	Manning	
Social Credit	Alfred Hooke	June 1, 1943	May 7, 1948	Manning	
Social Credit	Ernest Manning	September 3, 1935	May 23, 1943	Aberhart	
United Farmers	Richard Gavin Reid	July 10, 1934	September 2, 1935	Reid	
United Farmers	John Edward Brownlee	July 29, 1926	July 9, 1934	Brownlee	
United Farmers	George Hoadley	November 23, 1925	June 4, 1926	Brownlee	
United Farmers	John Edward Brownlee	November 3, 1923	November 22, 1925	Greenfield	
United Farmers	Herbert Greenfield	August 13, 1921	November 2, 1923	Greenfield	
Liberal	Jean Côté	September 25, 1918	August 12, 1921	Stewart	
Liberal	Wilfrid Gariépy	August 26, 1918	September 24, 1918	Stewart	
Liberal	George P. Smith	October 16, 1917	August 25, 1918	Stewart	
Liberal	Archibald J. McLean	June 1, 1910	October 15, 1917	Sifton	
Liberal	Duncan Marshall	November 1, 1909	May 31, 1910	Rutherford	
Liberal	William Finlay	September 8, 1905	November 1, 1909	Rutherford	

== Minister of Public Welfare ==
Minister of Public Welfare
Affiliation	Name	Date appointed	Date departed	Premier(s)	Notes
Social Credit	Ray Speaker	July 16, 1968	September 10, 1971	Strom, Manning	
Social Credit	Alfred Hooke	June 29, 1967	July 16, 1968	Manning	
Social Credit	Leonard Halmrast	October 15, 1962	June 29, 1967	Manning	
Social Credit	Robin Jorgenson	January 5, 1954	October 15, 1962	Manning	
Social Credit	Leonard Halmrast	January 3, 1953	January 5, 1954	Manning	
Social Credit	Wallace Cross	March 30, 1944	January 3, 1953	Manning	

== Minister of Recreation and Parks ==
Minister of Recreation and Parks
Affiliation	Name	Date appointed	Date departed	Premier(s)	Notes
In February 1992, this portfolio was merged with Tourism and responsibility handed to the Minister of Tourism, Parks and Recreation.
Progressive Conservative	Steve West	April 14, 1989	February 23, 1992	Getty	Minister of Recreation and Parks
Progressive Conservative	Norm Weiss	May 26, 1986	April 13, 1989	Getty	Minister of Recreation and Parks
Progressive Conservative	Peter Trynchy	March 23, 1979	May 25, 1986	Lougheed	Minister of Recreation and Parks
Progressive Conservative	Al Adair	April 3, 1975	March 22, 1979	Lougheed	Minister of Recreation, Parks and Wildlife
Progressive Conservative	Horst Schmid	September 10, 1971	April 2, 1975	Lougheed	Minister of Culture, Youth, and Recreation
Social Credit	Ambrose Holowach	April 1, 1971	September 9, 1971	Strom	Minister of Culture, Youth, and Recreation

== Minister of Restructuring and Government Efficiency ==
Minister of Restructuring and Government Efficiency
Affiliation	Name	Date appointed	Date departed	Premier(s)	Notes
Progressive Conservative	Luke Ouellette	November 25, 2004	December 15, 2006	Klein	

== Minister of Revenue ==
Minister of Revenue
Affiliation	Name	Date appointed	Date departed	Premier(s)	Notes
Progressive Conservative	Greg Melchin	March 16, 2001	November 24, 2004	Klein	

== Minister of Social Development ==
Minister of Social Development
Affiliation	Name	Date appointed	Date departed	Premier(s)	Notes
Social Credit	Raymond Speaker	July 1, 1969	April 27, 1971	Strom	

== Minister of Special Projects ==
Minister of Special Projects
Affiliation	Name	Date appointed	Date departed	Premier(s)	Notes
Progressive Conservative	Neil Stanley Crawford	September 10, 1987	April 13, 1989	Getty	

== Treasury Board President ==
With the exception of a brief period from 1934 until 1935, this function has been fulfilled by the provincial treasurer for the province's entire pre-2004 history.

Treasury Board President
Affiliation	Name	Date appointed	Date departed	Premier(s)	Notes
Function filled by Minister of Finance
Progressive Conservative	Doug Horner	October 12, 2011	May 7, 2012	Redford, Hancock	President of Treasury Board and Enterprise
Progressive Conservative	Lloyd Snelgrove	December 15, 2006	October 11, 2011	Stelmach	
Function filled by Provincial Treasurer or Minister of Finance
United Farmers	Richard G. Reid	July 10, 1934	September 3, 1935	Reid	

== Minister of Assisted Living and Social Services ==
One of four new positions created to replace the Minister of Health roll on May 16, 2025.

Minister of Health
Affiliation	Name	Date appointed	Date departed	Premier(s)	Notes
United Conservative	Jason Nixon	May 16, 2025	current	Smith	Minister of Health

== Minister of Hospital and Surgical Health Services ==
One of four new positions created to replace the Minister of Health roll on May 16, 2025.

Minister of Health
Affiliation	Name	Date appointed	Date departed	Premier(s)	Notes
United Conservative	Matt Jones	May 16, 2025	current	Smith	Minister of Health

== Minister of Mental Health and Addiction ==
One of four new positions created to replace the Minister of Health roll on May 16, 2025.

Minister of Health
Affiliation	Name	Date appointed	Date departed	Premier(s)	Notes
United Conservative	Rick Wilson	May 16, 2025	current	Smith	Minister of Health

== Primary and Preventative Health Services ==
One of four new positions created to replace the Minister of Health roll on May 16, 2025.

Minister of Health
Affiliation	Name	Date appointed	Date departed	Premier(s)	Notes
United Conservative	Adriana LaGrange	May 16, 2025	current	Smith	Minister of Health
