= Allen Russell Patrick =

Canadian politician

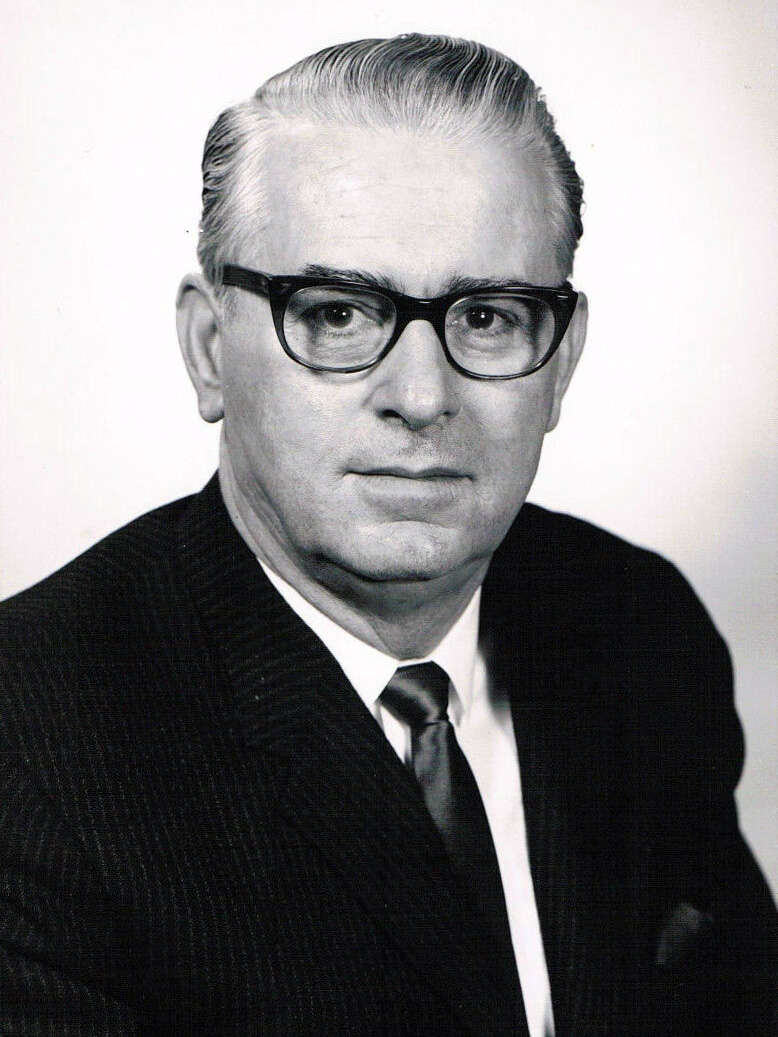

Member of the Legislative Assembly of Alberta
- In office August 5, 1952 – August 30, 1971
- Preceded by: Duncan MacMillan
- Succeeded by: Jack Cookson
- Constituency: Lacombe

Minister of Economic Affairs
- In office August 2, 1955 – September 1, 1959
- Premier: Ernest Manning
- Preceded by: Alfred Hooke
- Succeeded by: Hugh Horner

Minister of Industry and Development
- In office September 1, 1959 – December 12, 1968
- Premier: Ernest Manning
- Preceded by: Alfred Hooke

Minister of Industry and Tourism
- In office December 12, 1968 – May 27, 1969
- Premier: Harry Strom
- Preceded by: Raymond Reierson
- Succeeded by: Raymond Ratzlaff

Provincial Secretary
- In office September 1, 1959 – October 15, 1962
- Premier: Ernest Manning
- Preceded by: Alfred Hooke
- Succeeded by: Ambrose Holowach

Minister of Mines and Minerals
- In office October 15, 1962 – September 10, 1971
- Premier: Ernest Manning and Harry Strom
- Preceded by: Ernest Manning
- Succeeded by: Bill Dickie

Personal details
- Born: September 15, 1910 Stettler, Alberta
- Died: December 25, 1995 (aged 85)
- Party: Social Credit
- Spouse: Florence Lyon
- Children: Lynn, Terry and Granton
- Occupation: teacher, stock broker and politician

Allen Russell Patrick (September 15, 1910 – December 25, 1995) was a politician from Alberta, Canada. He served in the Legislative Assembly of Alberta from 1952 to 1971 as a member of the Social Credit caucus in government. He held numerous portfolios as a cabinet minister in the governments of Ernest Manning and Harry Strom from 1955 to 1971.

== Early life ==
Patrick grew up in Stettler, Alberta, and earned his high school diploma in 1928. He went to Calgary and worked as a stockbroker. He lost his job after the stock market collapsed in 1929. After being unemployed for a year, he was accepted into a teacher-training program in Camrose, Alberta. He then taught students from grades one to nine in a small rural school. In the summer he took courses at the University of Alberta.

Patrick married Florence Lyon on December 22, 1934. They had three children.

== Political career ==
Patrick first ran for a seat to the Alberta Legislature in the 1952 general election, as a Social Credit candidate in the electoral district of Lacombe. He defeated two other candidates with a large majority of the popular vote to hold the seat for his party.

In the 1955 general election he defeated Progressive Conservative candidate Alfred Haarstad and another candidate with just over half of the popular vote.

Premier Ernest Manning appointed Patrick Minister of Economic Affairs on August 2, 1955. In the 1959 general election Patrick won a very large majority.

Premier Manning shuffled the cabinet on September 1, 1959, and moved Patrick to the Ministry of Industry and Development. and to the position of Provincial Secretary.

On October 15, 1962, Patrick was shuffled from the post of Provincial Secretary to the Ministry of Mines and Minerals; he remained the Minister of Industry and Development. In the 1963 general election he won the largest majority and largest share of the popular vote in his political career.

In the 1967 general election he defeated Progressive Conservative candidate Jack Cookson and another candidate with just under half the popular vote.

On December 12, 1968 Premier Harry Strom appointed Patrick the Minister of Industry and Tourism, which he held until May 27, 1969. He retained the Economic Affairs portfolio until the end of his career.

Patrick retired from provincial politics at dissolution of the Assembly in 1971.

== Late life ==
After leaving public office, Patrick's cabinet records were donated to the Alberta Archives. He died on December 25, 1995.
