= Jack Cookson =

Canadian politician (1928–2021)

Member of the Legislative Assembly of Alberta
- In office August 30, 1971 – November 2, 1982
- Preceded by: Allen Patrick
- Succeeded by: Ronald Moore
- Constituency: Lacombe

Minister of the Environment
- In office March 1979 – November 1982
- Premier: Peter Lougheed
- Preceded by: David John Russell
- Succeeded by: Frederick Bradley

Personal details
- Born: John William Cookson; October 29, 1928 Lougheed, Alberta, Canada
- Died: July 8, 2021 (aged 92) Lacombe, Alberta, Canada
- Party: Progressive Conservative
- Occupation: politician

John William Cookson (October 29, 1928 – July 8, 2021) was a provincial politician from Alberta, Canada. He served as a member of the Legislative Assembly of Alberta from 1971 to 1982 sitting with the governing Progressive Conservative caucus. During his time in office he served in the Executive Council of Alberta as Minister of the Environment from 1979 to 1982 under the Peter Lougheed government.

== Political career ==
Cookson ran for a seat to the Alberta Legislature for the first time in the 1967 Alberta general election. He was defeated by incumbent Allen Patrick finishing a strong second.

Cookson ran for a second time in the 1971 Alberta general election. He won the electoral district of Lacombe in a tight race over Social Credit candidate Ivan Stonehocker to pick up the district for the Progressive Conservatives who went on to form government that election.

Cookson and Stonehocker would face each other again in the 1975 Alberta general election. Stonehocker's vote collapsed and Cookson won his second term easily. He would run for a third term in office in the 1979 Alberta general election. That election saw a crowded field of candidates with Cookson facing four opponents. He won a slightly larger share of the popular vote winning an easy victory on election night.

After the election Premier Peter Lougheed appointed Cookson to be Minister of the Environment. He held that portfolio until he retired at dissolution of the Assembly in 1982.
