= Lacombe (provincial electoral district) =

Defunct provincial electoral district in Alberta, Canada

Alberta electoral district

Defunct provincial electoral district
- Legislature: Legislative Assembly of Alberta
- District created: 1905
- District abolished: 1993
- First contested: 1905
- Last contested: 1989

Lacombe was a provincial electoral district in Alberta, Canada, mandated to return a single member to the Legislative Assembly of Alberta from 1905 to 1993.

== History ==
Lacombe was one of the original 25 electoral districts contested in the 1905 Alberta general election upon Alberta becoming a province in September 1905. The electoral district was a continuation of the Lacombe North-West Territories electoral district which was formed in 1902. The electoral district was named for the city of Lacombe in central Alberta.

From 1924 to 1956, the district used instant-runoff voting to elect its MLA.

Lacombe was dissolved in the 1993 electoral district re-distribution. The more urbanized portion, including the city of Lacombe, was merged with neighbouring Stettler to form Lacombe-Stettler, while the more rural portion was transferred to Rocky Mountain House.

=== Members of the Legislative Assembly (MLAs) ===
Members of the Legislative Assembly for Lacombe
Assembly	Years	Member	Party
1st	1905–1909	William F. Puffer	Liberal
2nd	1909–1913	William F. Puffer	Liberal
3rd	1913–1917	William F. Puffer	Liberal
4th	1917–1921	Andrew Gilmour	Conservative
5th	1921–1926	Irene Parlby	United Farmers
6th	1926–1930	Irene Parlby	United Farmers
7th	1930–1935	Irene Parlby	United Farmers
8th	1935–1940	Duncan B. MacMillan	Social Credit
9th	1940–1944	Duncan B. MacMillan	Social Credit
10th	1944–1948	Duncan B. MacMillan	Social Credit
11th	1948–1952	Duncan B. MacMillan	Social Credit
12th	1952–1955	Allen Russell Patrick	Social Credit
13th	1955–1959	Allen Russell Patrick	Social Credit
14th	1959–1963	Allen Russell Patrick	Social Credit
15th	1963–1967	Allen Russell Patrick	Social Credit
16th	1967–1971	Allen Russell Patrick	Social Credit
17th	1971–1975	Jack W. Cookson	Progressive Conservative
18th	1975–1979	Jack W. Cookson	Progressive Conservative
19th	1979–1982	Jack W. Cookson	Progressive Conservative
20th	1982–1986	Ronald A. Moore	Progressive Conservative
21st	1986–1989	Ronald A. Moore	Progressive Conservative
22nd	1989–1993	Ronald A. Moore	Progressive Conservative
See Lacombe-Stettler electoral district from 1993-2004 and Rocky Mountain House electoral district from 1993-2012

== Election results ==
=== 1905 ===
1905 Alberta general election
Party	Candidate	Votes	%	±%
Liberal	William F. Puffer	612	52.80%	–
Conservative	Andrew Gilmour	547	47.20%	–
Total		1,159	–	–
Rejected, spoiled and declined		N/A	–	–
Eligible electors / turnout		N/A	N/A	–
Liberal pickup new district.				
Source(s) Source: "Lacombe Official Results 1905 Alberta general election". Alberta Heritage Community Foundation.

=== 1909 ===
1909 Alberta general election
Party	Candidate	Votes	%	±%
Liberal	William F. Puffer	Acclaimed	–	–
Total		N/A	–	–
Rejected, spoiled and declined		N/A	–	–
Eligible electors / turnout		N/A	N/A	–
Liberal hold		Swing		N/A
Source(s) Source: "Lacombe Official Results 1909 Alberta general election". Alberta Heritage Community Foundation.

=== 1913 ===
1913 Alberta general election
Party	Candidate	Votes	%	±%
Liberal	William F. Puffer	878	58.46%	–
Conservative	Angus MacDonald	624	41.54%	–
Total		1,502	–	–
Rejected, spoiled and declined		N/A	–	–
Eligible electors / turnout		2,029	74.03%	–
Liberal hold		Swing		N/A
Source(s) Source: "Lacombe Official Results 1913 Alberta general election". Alberta Heritage Community Foundation.

=== 1917 ===
1917 Alberta general election
Party	Candidate	Votes	%	±%
Conservative	Andrew Gilmour	1,423	51.63%	10.09%
Liberal	William F. Puffer	1,333	48.37%	-10.09%
Total		2,756	–	–
Rejected, spoiled and declined		N/A	–	–
Eligible electors / turnout		3,530	78.07%	4.05%
Conservative gain from Liberal		Swing		-6.82%
Source(s) Source: "Lacombe Official Results 1917 Alberta general election". Alberta Heritage Community Foundation.

=== 1921 ===
1921 Alberta general election
Party	Candidate	Votes	%	±%
United Farmers	Irene Parlby	2,113	57.86%	–
Liberal	William F. Puffer	1,539	42.14%	-6.23%
Total		3,652	–	–
Rejected, spoiled and declined		N/A	–	–
Eligible electors / turnout		4,457	81.94%	3.86%
United Farmers gain from Conservative		Swing		6.23%
Source(s) Source: "Lacombe Official Results 1921 Alberta general election". Alberta Heritage Community Foundation.

=== 1926 ===
1926 Alberta general election
Party	Candidate	Votes	%	±%
United Farmers	Irene Parlby	1,891	53.58%	-4.27%
Liberal	William F. Puffer	1,162	32.93%	-9.21%
Conservative	P. W. Pratt	476	13.49%	–
Total		3,529	–	–
Rejected, spoiled and declined		209	–	–
Eligible electors / turnout		5,008	74.64%	-7.30%
United Farmers hold		Swing		2.47%
Source(s) Source: "Lacombe Official Results 1926 Alberta general election". Alberta Heritage Community Foundation.

=== 1930 ===
1930 Alberta general election
Party	Candidate	Votes	%	±%
United Farmers	Irene Parlby	1,932	51.36%	-2.23%
Independent	J. R. Mackie	1,830	48.64%	–
Total		3,762	–	–
Rejected, spoiled and declined		142	–	–
Eligible electors / turnout		5,178	75.40%	0.76%
United Farmers hold		Swing		-8.97%
Source(s) Source: "Lacombe Official Results 1930 Alberta general election". Alberta Heritage Community Foundation.

=== 1935 ===
1935 Alberta general election
Party	Candidate	Votes	%	±%
Social Credit	Duncan B. MacMillan	3,483	62.63%	–
Liberal	F. J. S. Sissons	838	15.07%	–
United Farmers	C. M. Ironside	721	12.97%	-38.39%
Conservative	P. W. Pratt	519	9.33%	–
Total		5,561	–	–
Rejected, spoiled and declined		125	–	–
Eligible electors / turnout		6,566	86.60%	11.20%
Social Credit gain from United Farmers		Swing		22.43%
Source(s) Source: "Lacombe Official Results 1935 Alberta general election". Alberta Heritage Community Foundation.

=== 1940 ===
1940 Alberta general election
Party	Candidate	Votes	%	±%
First count
Social Credit	Duncan B. MacMillan	2,321	46.35%	-16.91%
Independent	R. E. Chowen	2,061	41.15%	–
Co-operative Commonwealth	C. M. Ironside	626	12.50%	–
Total		5,008	–	–
Ballot transfer results
Social Credit	Duncan B. MacMillan	2,457	51.00%	–
Independent	R. E. Chowen	2,361	49.00%	–
Total		4,818	–	–
Rejected, spoiled and declined		144	–	–
Eligible electors / turnout		6,817	75.85%	-10.75%
Social Credit hold		Swing		N/A
Source(s) Source: "Lacombe Official Results 1940 Alberta general election". Alberta Heritage Community Foundation. Instant-runoff voting requires a candidate to receive a plurality (greater than 50%) of the votes. As no candidate received a plurality of votes, the bottom candidate was eliminated and their 2nd place votes were applied to both other candidates until one received a plurality

=== 1944 ===
1944 Alberta general election
Party	Candidate	Votes	%	±%
Social Credit	Duncan B. MacMillan	2,442	53.78%	7.43%
Co-operative Commonwealth	Robert H. Carlyle	1,324	29.16%	16.76%
Independent	R. E. Chowen	775	17.07%	-24.08%
Total		4,541	–	–
Rejected, spoiled and declined		84	–	–
Eligible electors / turnout		6,286	73.58%	-2.27%
Social Credit hold		Swing		N/A%
Source(s) Source: "Lacombe Official Results 1944 Alberta general election". Alberta Heritage Community Foundation.

=== 1948 ===
1948 Alberta general election
Party	Candidate	Votes	%	±%
Social Credit	Duncan B. MacMillan	3,053	63.54%	9.76%
Co-operative Commonwealth	Robert H. Carlyle	1,109	23.08%	-6.08%
Liberal	Thomas Wilkes	643	13.38%	–
Total		4,805	–	–
Rejected, spoiled and declined		266	–	–
Eligible electors / turnout		7,164	70.78%	-2.79%
Social Credit hold		Swing		7.92%
Source(s) Source: "Lacombe Official Results 1948 Alberta general election". Alberta Heritage Community Foundation.

=== 1952 ===
1952 Alberta general election
Party	Candidate	Votes	%	±%
Social Credit	Allen Russell Patrick	2,446	58.54%	-4.99%
Co-operative Commonwealth	Ernest John Ingram	975	23.34%	0.26%
Liberal	Arnold A. Bruns	757	18.12%	4.74%
Total		4,178	–	–
Rejected, spoiled and declined		290	–	–
Eligible electors / turnout		6,358	70.27%	-0.51%
Social Credit hold		Swing		-2.62%
Source(s) Source: "Lacombe Official Results 1952 Alberta general election". Alberta Heritage Community Foundation.

=== 1955 ===
1955 Alberta general election
Party	Candidate	Votes	%	±%
Social Credit	Allen Russell Patrick	2,255	50.83%	-7.71%
Conservative	Alfred B. Haarstad	1,579	35.60%	–
Co-operative Commonwealth	Ernest John Ingram	602	13.57%	-9.77%
Total		4,436	–	–
Rejected, spoiled and declined		338	–	–
Eligible electors / turnout		6,586	72.49%	2.21%
Social Credit hold		Swing		-9.98%
Source(s) Source: "Lacombe Official Results 1955 Alberta general election". Alberta Heritage Community Foundation.

=== 1959 ===
1959 Alberta general election
Party	Candidate	Votes	%	±%
Social Credit	Allen Russell Patrick	3,089	63.42%	12.58%
Progressive Conservative	Denis R. Stafford	1,162	23.86%	–
Co-operative Commonwealth	Robert H. Carlyle	620	12.73%	-0.84%
Total		4,871	–	–
Rejected, spoiled and declined		N/A	–	–
Eligible electors / turnout		6,824	71.38%	-1.11%
Social Credit hold		Swing		12.16%
Source(s) Source: "Lacombe Official Results 1959 Alberta general election". Alberta Heritage Community Foundation.

=== 1963 ===
1963 Alberta general election
Party	Candidate	Votes	%	±%
Social Credit	Allen Russell Patrick	3,405	69.31%	5.89%
Liberal	John Paul Fehrenbach	776	15.79%	–
New Democratic	John Liss	732	14.90%	–
Total		4,913	–	–
Rejected, spoiled and declined		6	–	–
Eligible electors / turnout		7,998	61.50%	-9.88%
Social Credit hold		Swing		6.98%
Source(s) Source: "Lacombe Official Results 1963 Alberta general election". Alberta Heritage Community Foundation.

=== 1967 ===
1967 Alberta general election
Party	Candidate	Votes	%	±%
Social Credit	Allen Russell Patrick	2,690	49.21%	-20.09%
Progressive Conservative	Jack W. Cookson	1,999	36.57%	–
New Democratic	Glen R. Nelson	777	14.22%	-0.68%
Total		5,466	–	–
Rejected, spoiled and declined		12	–	–
Eligible electors / turnout		7,332	74.71%	13.21%
Social Credit hold		Swing		-20.43%
Source(s) Source: "Lacombe Official Results 1967 Alberta general election". Alberta Heritage Community Foundation.

=== 1971 ===
1971 Alberta general election
Party	Candidate	Votes	%	±%
Progressive Conservative	Jack W. Cookson	3,094	50.49%	13.92%
Social Credit	Ivan Stonehocker	2,582	42.13%	-7.08%
New Democratic	Ragnar Johanson	452	7.38%	-6.84%
Total		6,128	–	–
Rejected, spoiled and declined		16	–	–
Eligible electors / turnout		8,036	76.46%	1.74%
Progressive Conservative gain from Social Credit		Swing		-2.14%
Source(s) Source: "Lacombe Official Results 1971 Alberta general election". Alberta Heritage Community Foundation.

=== 1975 ===
1975 Alberta general election
Party	Candidate	Votes	%	±%
Progressive Conservative	Jack W. Cookson	4,186	68.78%	18.29%
Social Credit	Ivan Stonehocker	1,414	23.23%	-18.90%
New Democratic	Ed Kamps	486	7.99%	0.61%
Total		6,086	–	–
Rejected, spoiled and declined		32	–	–
Eligible electors / turnout		8,505	71.93%	-4.52%
Progressive Conservative hold		Swing		18.60%
Source(s) Source: "Lacombe Official Results 1975 Alberta general election". Alberta Heritage Community Foundation.

=== 1979 ===
1979 Alberta general election
Party	Candidate	Votes	%	±%
Progressive Conservative	Jack W. Cookson	4,458	64.34%	-4.44%
Social Credit	Elmer Suominen	1,409	20.33%	-2.90%
New Democratic	Art Wigmore	717	10.35%	2.36%
Liberal	Roger C. Holteen	260	3.75%	–
Independent	Gordon Crofton	85	1.23%	–
Total		6,929	–	–
Rejected, spoiled and declined		N/A	–	–
Eligible electors / turnout		10,367	66.84%	-5.10%
Progressive Conservative hold		Swing		-0.77%
Source(s) Source: "Lacombe Official Results 1979 Alberta general election". Alberta Heritage Community Foundation.

=== 1982 ===
1982 Alberta general election
Party	Candidate	Votes	%	±%
Progressive Conservative	Ron A. Moore	5,141	61.21%	-3.13%
Western Canada Concept	Terry Long	1,339	15.94%	–
New Democratic	Glen R. Nelson	1,108	13.19%	2.84%
Independent	Howard P. Thompson	811	9.66%	8.43%
Total		8,399	–	–
Rejected, spoiled and declined		12	–	–
Eligible electors / turnout		11,600	72.51%	5.67%
Progressive Conservative hold		Swing		0.63%
Source(s) Source: "Lacombe Official Results 1982 Alberta general election". Alberta Heritage Community Foundation.

=== 1986 ===
1986 Alberta general election
Party	Candidate	Votes	%	±%
Progressive Conservative	Ron A. Moore	4,079	77.99%	16.78%
New Democratic	Ken Ling	1,151	22.01%	8.82%
Total		5,230	–	–
Rejected, spoiled and declined		19	–	–
Eligible electors / turnout		11,699	44.87%	-27.64%
Progressive Conservative hold		Swing		5.36%
Source(s) Source: "Lacombe Official Results 1986 Alberta general election". Alberta Heritage Community Foundation.

=== 1989 ===
1989 Alberta general election
Party	Candidate	Votes	%	±%
Progressive Conservative	Ron A. Moore	4,014	59.93%	-18.06%
Liberal	Roger Young	1,467	21.90%	–
New Democratic	Cliff Reid	1,217	18.17%	-3.84%
Total		6,698	–	–
Rejected, spoiled and declined		24	–	–
Eligible electors / turnout		12,214	55.04%	10.17%
Progressive Conservative hold		Swing		-8.98%
Source(s) Source: "Lacombe Official Results 1989 Alberta general election". Alberta Heritage Community Foundation.

== Plebiscite results ==
=== 1957 liquor plebiscite ===
1957 Alberta liquor plebiscite results: Lacombe
Question A: Do you approve additional types of outlets for the sale of beer, wine and spirituous liquor subject to a local vote?
Ballot choice	Votes	%
No	2,011	62.53%
Yes	1,205	37.47%
Total votes	3,216	100%
Rejected, spoiled and declined	52	
6,302 eligible electors, turnout 51.86%

On October 30, 1957, a stand-alone plebiscite was held province wide in all 50 of the then current provincial electoral districts in Alberta. The government decided to consult Alberta voters to decide on liquor sales and mixed drinking after a divisive debate in the Legislature. The plebiscite was intended to deal with the growing demand for reforming antiquated liquor control laws.

The plebiscite was conducted in two parts. Question A, asked in all districts, asked the voters if the sale of liquor should be expanded in Alberta, while Question B, asked in a handful of districts within the corporate limits of Calgary and Edmonton, asked if men and women were allowed to drink together in establishments.

Province wide Question A of the plebiscite passed in 33 of the 50 districts while Question B passed in all five districts. Lacombe voted against the proposal by a wide margin. The voter turnout in the district was well above the province wide average of 46% with well over half the electors turning out to vote.

Official district returns were released to the public on December 31, 1957. The Social Credit government in power at the time did not consider the results binding. However the results of the vote led the government to repeal all existing liquor legislation and introduce an entirely new Liquor Act.

Municipal districts lying inside electoral districts that voted against the plebiscite such as Lacombe were designated Local Option Zones by the Alberta Liquor Control Board and considered effective dry zones, business owners that wanted a licence had to petition for a binding municipal plebiscite in order to be granted a licence.

== See also ==
- List of Alberta provincial electoral districts
- Canadian provincial electoral districts
