= Duncan MacMillan (Alberta politician) =

Canadian politician

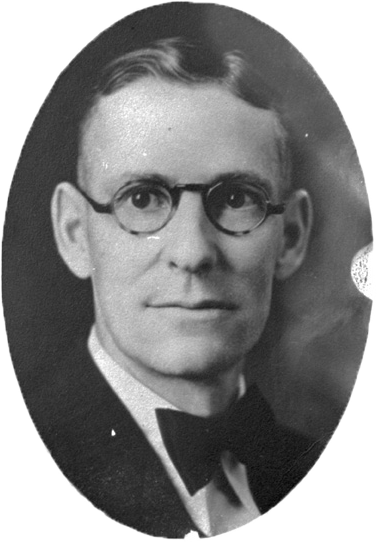

Member of the Legislative Assembly of Alberta
- In office 1935–1952
- Preceded by: Irene Parlby
- Succeeded by: Allen Russell Patrick
- Constituency: Lacombe

Personal details
- Born: August 27, 1887 Norland, Ontario, Canada
- Died: December 20, 1962 (aged 75) Edmonton, Alberta, Canada
- Party: Social Credit

Duncan Bruce MacMillan (August 27, 1887 – December 20, 1962) was a provincial politician from Alberta, Canada. He served as a member of the Legislative Assembly of Alberta from 1935 to 1952, sitting with the Social Credit caucus in government.
