= Irene Parlby =

Canadian politician (1868–1965)

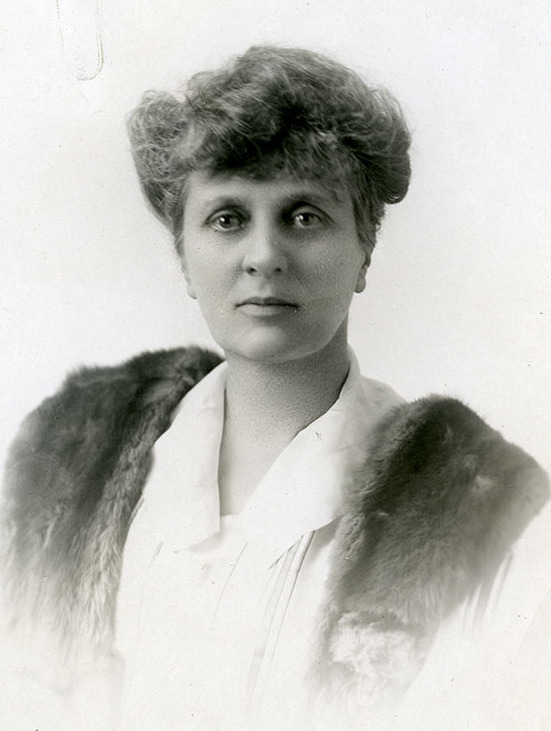

Member of the Legislative Assembly of Alberta
- In office 1921–1935
- Preceded by: Andrew Gilmour
- Succeeded by: Duncan MacMillan
- Constituency: Lacombe
- 1921–1935: Minister without portfolio

Personal details
- Born: Mary Irene Marryat; 9 January 1868 London, England
- Died: 12 July 1965 (aged 97) Red Deer, Alberta, Canada
- Party: United Farmers
- Spouse: Walter Parlby (m. 1897; died 1951)
- Children: 1
- Occupation: Women's rights activist; politician

Mary Irene Parlby (née Marryat; 9 January 1868 – 12 July 1965) was a Canadian women's farm leader, activist and politician. She served as MLA in the United Farmers of Alberta government from 1921 to 1935, serving as Minister without portfolio in the Cabinet of Alberta during that time. She worked to implement social reforms that helped farm women and children and was an advocate of public health programs. As a member of the Famous Five, she was one of five women who took the Persons Case first to the Supreme Court of Canada, and then to the British Judicial Committee of the Privy Council for the right of women to serve in the Senate of Canada. From 1930 to 1934, she was one of three Canadian representatives at the League of Nations in Geneva, Switzerland.

Parlby's accomplishments have garnered her many honours, both before and after her death. In 1935, the University of Alberta granted her an honorary Doctorate of Laws, making her the first woman in its history to receive such a distinction. In 1966, a year after her death, she was named a Person of National Historic Significance, and in 2009, the Senate of Canada voted to name Parlby and other members of the Famous Five Canada's first honorary Senators.

== Early life ==
Parlby was born Mary Irene Marryat on 9 January 1868 in London, England, the eldest of eight children of Colonel Ernest Lindsay Marryat and Mrs. Elizabeth Lynch Marryat. The Marryats had many well-known relatives, including Frederick Marryat, a Royal Navy author and writer, and Henry Young, a colonial administrator in Australia. She lived in India for six years, from 1868 until 1871 and from 1881 to 1884, due to her father's job in the Royal Engineers. Her family was in the upper middle class, and the children were taught by governesses instead of attending school. She was interested in writing and acting, creating plays for family and friends. She received a good education, studying music and elocution, and was interested in theatre, though such a career was considered inappropriate for a woman of her social status. In 1884, when Irene was 16, her father retired from his work in India and returned with his family to England, where they rented a farm in Limpsfield, Surrey.

She enjoyed her social life, but felt that her life was aimless; she later described this as "killing time as pleasantly as possible". In the mid-1890s, she spent time in Switzerland, recovering from an illness. In 1896, Alix Westhead, a family friend from their time in India, invited Irene to stay with her in the Northwest Territories (present-day Alberta). After receiving her parents' consent, Parlby left for Canada in May 1896, at the age of 28. Shortly after arriving in Canada, she met Walter Parlby, an Oxford graduate who had arrived in Canada in 1890. They were engaged by the autumn of 1896, and later built a house near Alix, Alberta. Irene and Walter visited family in England in 1899. In November 1899, while in England, she gave birth to a son, Humphrey Marryat Hall Parlby.

== Political career ==
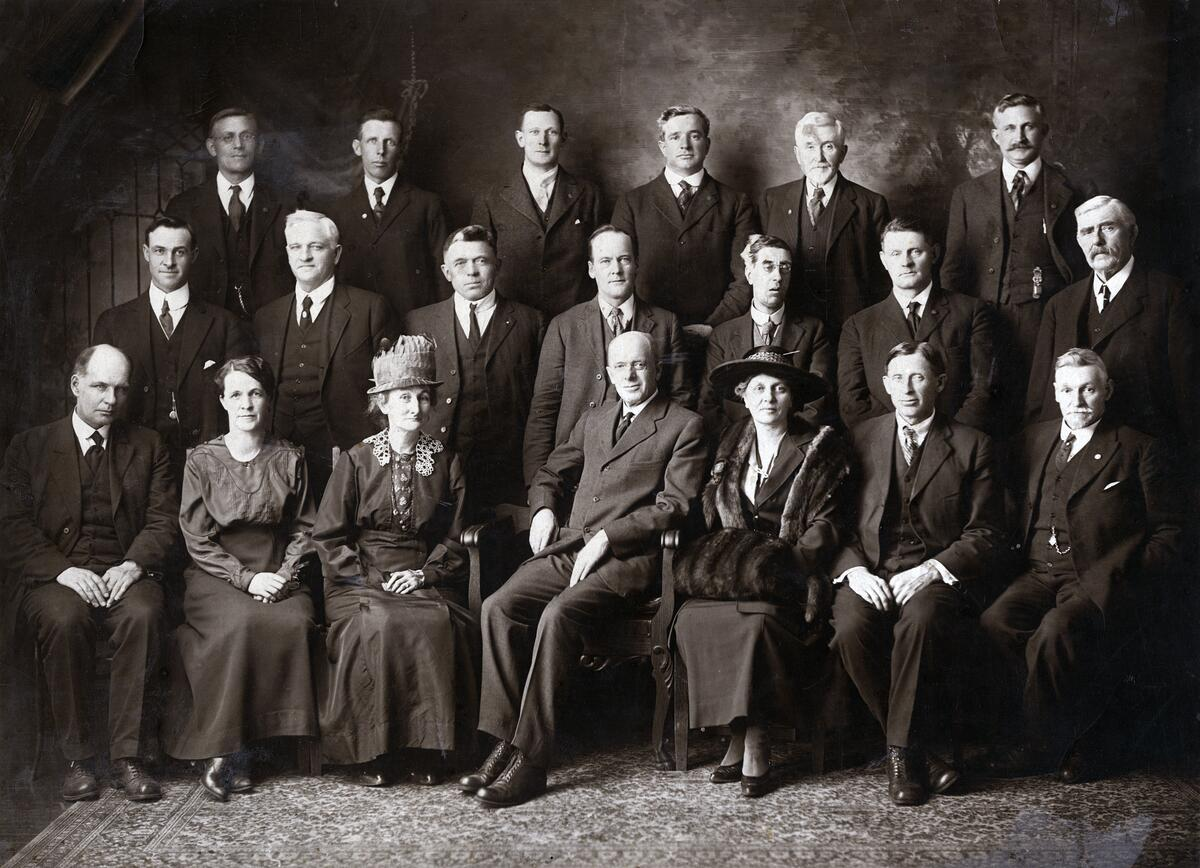
Board of Directors of the United Farmers of Alberta in 1919. Parlby is third from the right on the bottom row.

Parlby's political life began in 1914 when she, along with other women in the area, created the Alix Country Women's Club (ACWC), and Parlby was chosen as secretary. One of the first accomplishments of the ACWC was to establish a local library, one of the first in the province. When the United Farm Women of Alberta (UFWA), an auxiliary group of the United Farmers of Alberta, was formed in 1915, the ACWC became the first local branch of the UFWA. The next year, she was elected to be the first president of the UFWA. Between 1918 and 1920, the membership grew from 1,450 to 4,000 women. As president, Parlby worked to improve healthcare and helped to establish municipal hospitals. In 1920, she resigned as president, saying: "The organization has reached a stage when its own momentum will help to carry it along, the difficult days of arousing interest and establishing the position of the organization are over, and I feel I can ... leave all active work in it to those who are more capable of carrying on than myself."

In the 1921 Alberta general election, Parlby put her name forward as a candidate for the riding of Lacombe, which she won, to her surprise. She called the campaign "nasty", due to the harassment she received for being female. Province-wide, the United Farmers won 38 out of the total of 61 seats, giving it a majority in the Legislative Assembly of Alberta. Herbert Greenfield was chosen to be the Premier, and Parlby was selected to be the Minister without Portfolio in the Cabinet, making her the second woman in the British Empire to hold a ministerial position, after Mary Ellen Smith of British Columbia. In 1930, she was chosen by Prime Minister R. B. Bennett to be one of three delegates of Canada to the League of Nations in Geneva, where she served until 1934. At the end of her third term in office, she decided that she would not seek re-election in the 1935 general election. However, she continued to lead an active public life and was an in-demand speaker, both in person and over the radio.

Throughout her term in office, Parlby used her influence to further numerous social reforms, primarily those of interest to women and children. She supported immigration, and in a time when nativism was on the rise, felt that people of all ethnic origins should embrace their heritage and value and preserve their culture. Parlby introduced and sponsored a large number of bills, including the Minimum Wage for Women Act, which made Alberta the first province to pass a minimum wage for women. She also attempted to pass the Community of Property Act, which would have allowed women to own all property they brought into a marriage, along with gifts and inheritance, but this was not passed as it was seen as too radical.

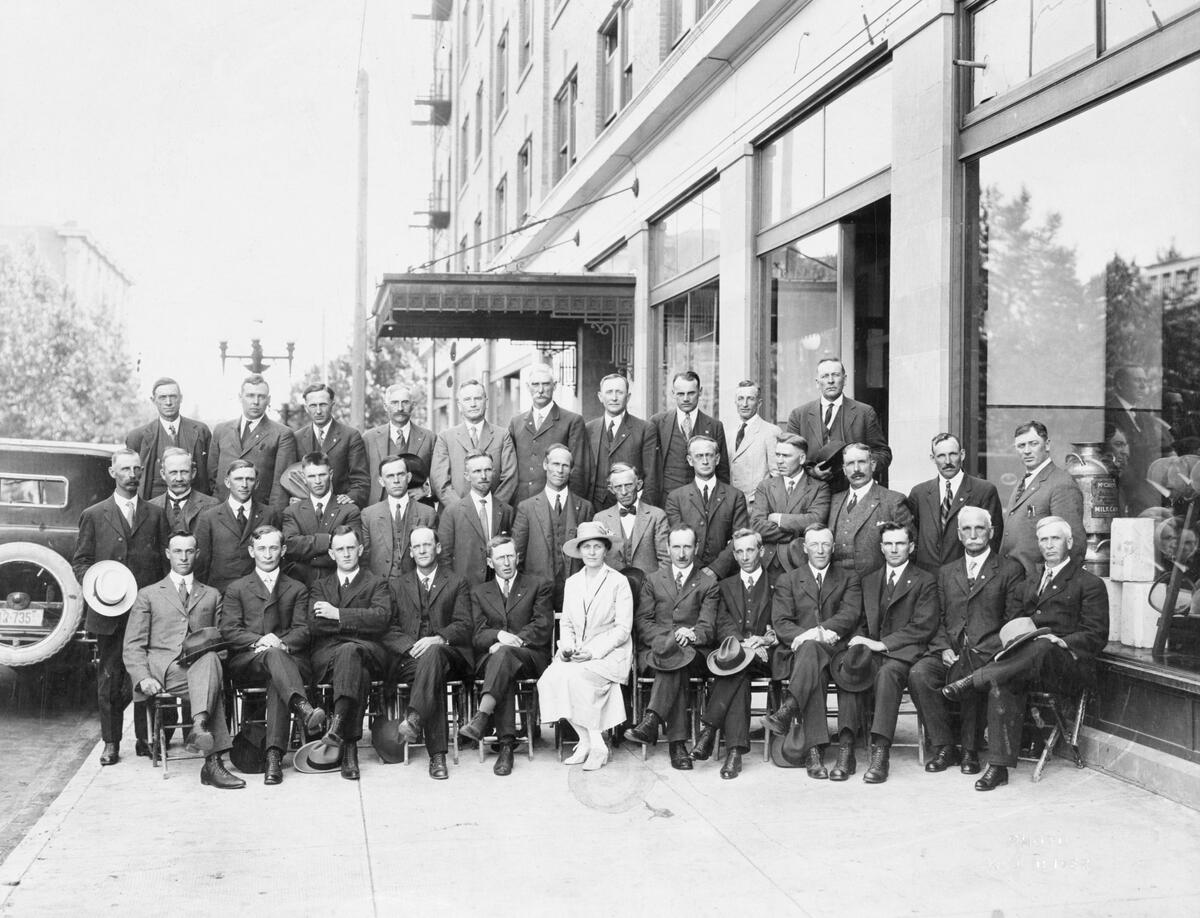
Caucus of the United Farmers of Alberta in 1921

=== Sexual Sterilization Act ===
Like many other prominent left wing Albertan politicians of the time, including fellow Famous Five members Murphy and McClung, Parlby was an advocate for the eugenics movement in Alberta. She supported the Sexual Sterilization Act, which allowed for the sterilization of mentally disabled people to prevent "undesirable" traits from being passed to the next generation. The Act disproportionately affected socially vulnerable people, including females and young adults, along with those of Indigenous ancestry. Parlby expressed sympathy for the mothers of mentally ill children and stated that the "great and only solution to the problem" was the sterilization of feeble-minded persons.

== Famous Five and the Persons Case ==
Parlby was one of the Famous Five, a group of five women including Henrietta Muir Edwards, Nellie McClung, Louise McKinney, and Emily Murphy, who petitioned the federal government for the right of women to serve as senators. The case became known as the "Persons Case", since the federal government took the position that women were not considered "qualified persons", in the provision of the British North America Act, 1867 relating to appointment to the Senate of Canada. In 1927, the case was taken to the Supreme Court of Canada, which ruled that women were not eligible for appointment to the Senate. The case was then appealed to the Judicial Committee of the Privy Council in London, the highest court of the British Empire. In 1929, the Judicial Committee overturned the Supreme Court's decision, allowing women to serve in the Senate. The first woman to serve in the Senate, Cairine Wilson, was appointed the following year.

== Death and legacy ==
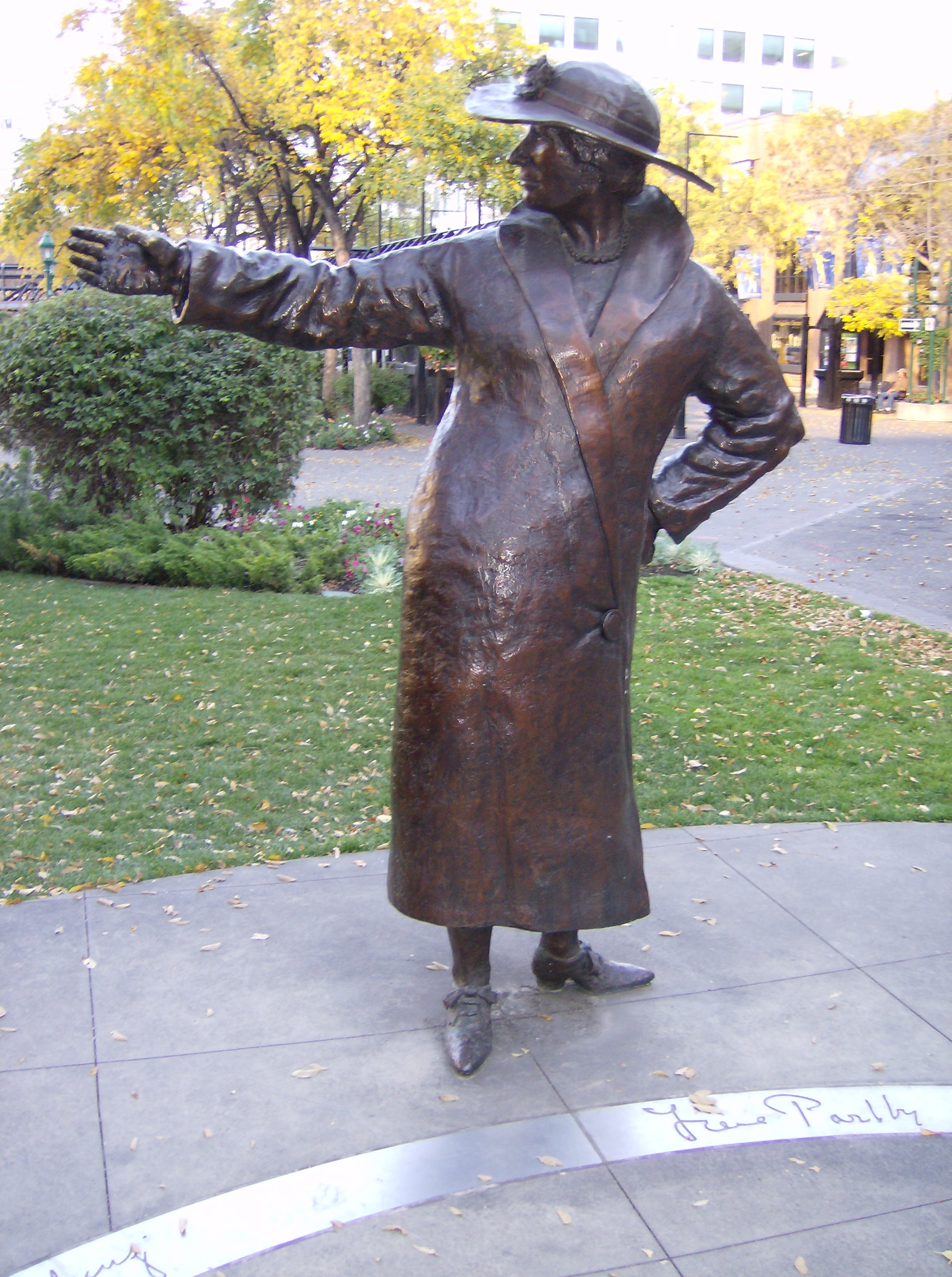
Statue of Irene Parlby in Calgary, Alberta, part of the Women are Persons! monument

In 1935, as recognition for her achievements over the past two decades, she became the first woman to be granted an honorary doctorate from the University of Alberta.

Parlby died on 12 July 1965 at a nursing home in Red Deer, Alberta. She was the last surviving member of the Famous Five.

In May 1966, Parlby was recognized as a Person of National Historic Significance by the government of Canada. A plaque commemorating this is found in Alix, Alberta. In 1997, the Persons Case was recognized as a National Historic Event. In 2000, two identical monuments were created in Calgary, Alberta, and near the Senate of Canada Building, in Ottawa, Ontario. The monuments, called Women are Persons!, depict the members of the Famous Five reading the news about their victory in the Persons Case. The monuments were later featured on the $50 banknote of the Canadian Journey series. In October 2009, the Senate voted to name Parlby and the rest of the Famous Five Canada's first "honorary senators".
