= Excel, Alberta =

Hamlet in Alberta, Canada

Excel
- Hamlet
- Location of Excel in Special Area No. 3 Excel (Alberta)
- Coordinates: 51.387056°N 110.574540°W
- Country: Canada
- Province: Alberta
- Region: Central Alberta
- Census division: No. 4
- Special Area: Special Area No. 3

Government
  - Type: Unincorporated
  - Governing body: Special Areas Board
- Elevation: 791 m (2,595 ft)
- Time zone: UTC−06:00 (Alberta Time)

Excel is a hamlet located in Special Area No. 3 in Alberta, Canada. It is situated 7 km (4.3 mi) away from Oyen, 8 km (5.0 mi) from Lanfine, and 15 km (9.3 mi) from Benton.

== Toponymy ==
The hamlet was named after a comment made by an early settler and business owner, Alfred Wetheral, at a meeting of the area's commercial community. Wetheral reportedly stated, "Let us excel."

== Topography ==
As part of the Special Areas, Excel is situated within Palliser's Triangle. The region is so named for being a semi-arid steppe that was deemed unsuited to agriculture by explorer John Palliser, during his expedition across western Canada in the 1850s. Excel's dry weather ultimately placed a ceiling on the settlement's development.

== History ==
=== Founding of Excel: 1911–1919 ===
In June 1911, local Alfred Wetheral began operating a post office under the name Excel. He also opened a general store, which had an upstairs floor that functioned as a community hall and venue for religious services.

Around this time, three schools organized near Excel. One was named North Excel School, owing to its location two miles north of the townsite; the others were named Farming Valley and Fairacres. The Canadian Northern Railway established a railroad through Excel in 1912, connecting it to Oyen, and a grain elevator opened to serve the hamlet by 1915.

=== Dry years and decline: 1920–1949 ===
In 1920, Albert Bakken, a member of the school board, relocated the North Excel School building to the townsite using a Rumely Oil Pull. The facility reopened as Excel School the following year, though it remained known locally as North Excel.

Excel's early growth belied the dry weather and crop failure afflicting farms in the area. Robert Gardiner, Excel farmer and affiliate of the United Farmers of Alberta (UFA), began his political career in 1921 by running to represent Medicine Hat in the House of Commons. He ran to advance the economic concerns of farmers in Alberta's dry areas, who felt the federal and provincial governments were failing to tackle escalating drought conditions that would become the dust bowl in the 1930s.

Other Excel residents formed an active UFA chapter in the locality's early decades, which also expanded Excel's social events. Local men formed a UFA-affiliated baseball team, and the men's and women's chapters held events to host politicians including Lorne Proudfoot. By 1932, Excel was the site of one of rural Alberta's earliest curling rinks. Nonetheless, the Great Depression negatively impacted Excel's economy throughout the 1930s, followed by successive years of poor crop yields.

Reflecting years later, visitor Jack Cooke would describe the village as "all but abandoned" by 1944, with only a grocery store and the Excel train station in operation. The Nearby schools of Farming Valley and Fairacres, respectively, closed in 1943 and 1944. Some farming operations continued nonetheless, and Excel resident Louise Johnston became a director of the United Farm Women of Alberta (UFWA) in 1946.

=== Rest of the 20th century: 1950–2000 ===
In November 1951, the Government of Alberta officially recognized Excel as an unincorporated place. Excel School closed by 1954, prompting some locals to form Excel Community Club for the purposes of purchasing the building. They were successful in acquiring the property and converted it into a community centre, which held social events until at least the mid-1960s. Excel Curling Club went dormant in 1955, and attempts to revive the organization in 1961 proved unsuccessful.

Between 1963 and 1967, Excel resident Louise Johnston served as President of the UFWA. Upon the completion of her term, she relocated to Calgary, and became a member of the University of Calgary's senate.

Excel's post office closed in August 1970.

=== 21st century: 2001–present ===
As of 2025, the Canadian National Railway maintains rail services through Excel. Little of the original townsite remains, though the area contains several properties.

== Notable residents ==
- Robert Gardiner – farmer and politician who began farming in Excel in 1911
- Louise Johnston – local farmer and president of the United Farm Women of Alberta between 1963 and 1967

== See also ==
- List of hamlets in Alberta
