= Rumely =

Rumely may refer to:

- M. Rumely Company, American agricultural equipment manufacturer that was reorganized as Advance-Rumely
- Rumely Oil Pull, a kerosene-powered farm tractor developed by Edward Rumely
- Rumely, Michigan, an unincorporated community in Rock River Township, Alger County

== People ==
- Edward Rumely (1882–1964), a physician, educator, and newspaper man from Indiana
- Robert Rumely (born 1952), mathematician and co-developer of the Adleman–Pomerance–Rumely primality test
