= Blood Indian Creek =

River in Alberta, Canada

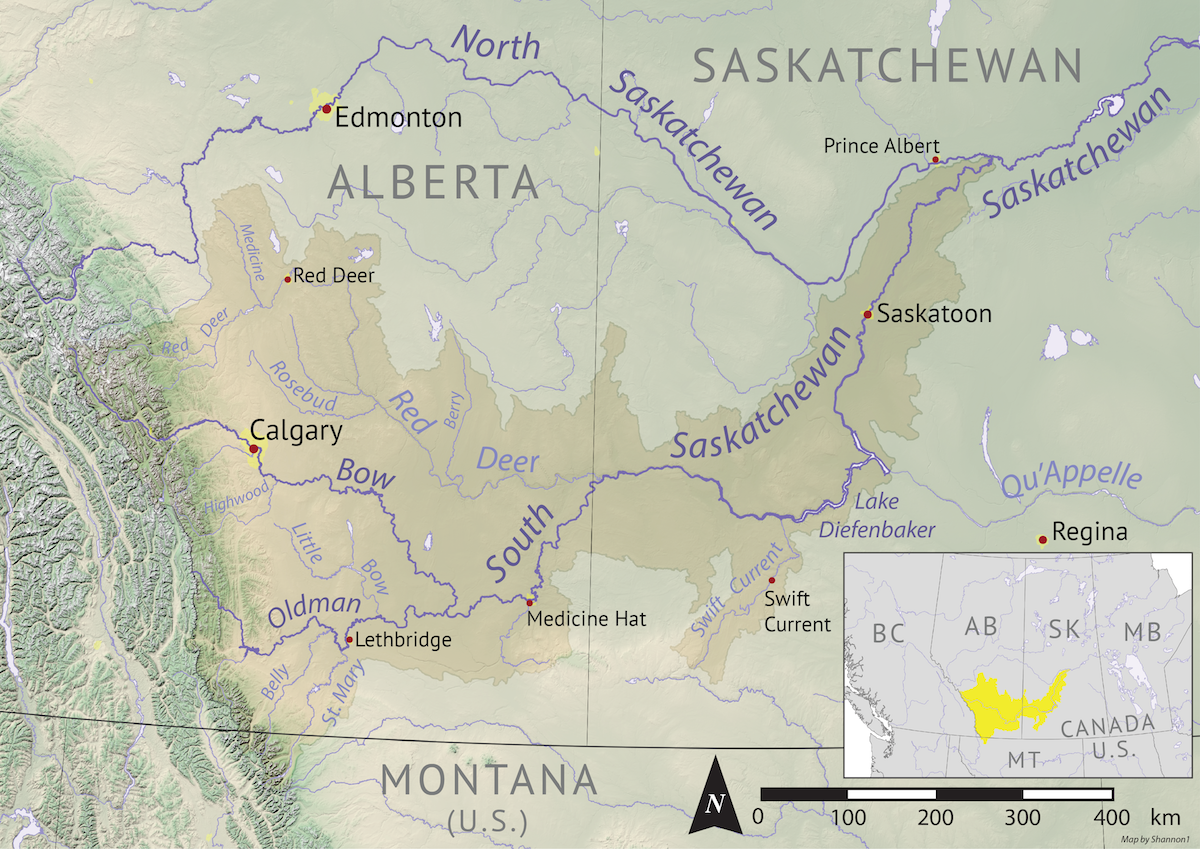
- The South Saskatchewan River drainage basin

- Location of the river's mouth in Alberta Blood Indian Creek (Canada)

Location
- Country: Canada
- Province: Alberta

Physical characteristics
- Source
  - location: Special Area No. 3
  - coordinates: 51.4214°N 111.2328°W
- Mouth: Red Deer River
  - location: Special Area No. 3
  - coordinates: 50.9144°N 111.0614°W

Basin features
- River system: South Saskatchewan River
- Waterbodies: Blood Indian Creek Reservoir

Blood Indian Creek is a river in the Canadian province of Alberta. It begins from a slough about 11.5 kilometres (7 mi) south of Youngstown in Special Area No. 3 and flows south to the Red Deer River. The river's name, Blood Indian, comes from an oral story about a battle between the Saulteaux and Blackfoot near the mouth of Blood Indian Creek.

For most of Blood Indian Creek's course, it follows Highway 884 south. Communities near the river's banks include Big Stone and Cabin Lake. In 1965, a dam was built across the river for drought and flood mitigation creating Blood Indian Creek Reservoir. Blood Indian Park, which was founded in 1987, encompasses most of the reservoir.

Blood Indian Creek was part of a proposed — but never implemented — large-scale drought and flood mitigation project originally conceived in 1920 by William Pearce for Canada's Department of Reclamation Services. The project, which was reviewed for feasibility in 1935 by the Prairie Farm Rehabilitation Administration, entailed the construction of multiple dams and reservoirs at the headwaters of the Red Deer River. A large diversion channel was then to be built from the Red Deer River to Sullivan Lake, thereby turning the lake into a large reservoir. A channel would be built east from the lake to Sounding Creek and another one south-east to the headwaters of multiple creeks, including Blood Indian. The project was never initiated.

== Blood Indian origin ==
An oral story by an "Old Lady" describes a battle between the Saulteaux and Blackfoot tribes at the mouth of Blood Indian Creek. In c. 1840, a Blackfoot raiding party attacked a Saulteaux camp killing many people, including three sons of the "Old Lady". In her "sorrow and anger", she organised a war party and tracked down the Blackfoot. She led a surprise attack against the Blackfoot camp at the mouth of a creek that flowed into the Red Deer River. That creek "ran red with the blood of the slain Blackfeet", hence the "Blood Indian" name for the creek.

== See also ==
- List of rivers of Alberta
- Hudson Bay drainage basin
