= Cabin Lake =

Cabin Lake may refer to:

- Cabin Lake, Alberta, a locality in Canada
- Cabin Lake (California), a lake in California
