= Helmsdale, Alberta =

Helmsdale, Alberta may refer to:

- Helmsdale, Airdrie, Alberta, a locality in Airdrie, Alberta
- Helmsdale, Rocky View County, a locality in Rocky View County, Alberta
- Helmsdale, Special Area No. 3, Alberta, a locality in Special Area No. 3, Alberta
