= UFWA =

UFWA may refer to:

== Organizations ==
- United Federal Workers of America
- United Farm Workers of America
- United Farm Women of Alberta
- United Farmers and Woolgrowers Association of Australia

== Other uses ==
- Unincorporated Far West Area
