= Blood Indian Creek Reservoir =

Reservoir in Alberta, Canada

- Location within Alberta Location within Canada
- Location: Special Area No. 3, Alberta
- Coordinates: 51°15′00″N 111°12′30″W
- Type: Reservoir
- Primary inflows: Blood Indian Creek
- Primary outflows: Blood Indian Creek
- Catchment area: 116 km^{2} (45 sq mi)
- Basin countries: Canada
- Managing agency: Special Areas Board
- Built: 1965
- Max. length: 3.3 km (2.1 mi)
- Max. width: 0.6 km (0.37 mi)
- Surface area: 103 ha (250 acres)
- Average depth: 4.6 m (15 ft)
- Max. depth: 13.3 m (44 ft)
- Shore length^{1}: 12.3 km (7.6 mi)
- Surface elevation: 760 m (2,490 ft)
- Settlements: None
- ^{1} Shore length is not a well-defined measure.

Blood Indian Creek Reservoir is a reservoir in Special Area No. 3 in Alberta, Canada. It is along the course of Blood Indian Creek, which is a tributary of the Red Deer River. Blood Indian Park surrounds most of the lake and the Big Stone Community Hall is on the eastern shore. Access to the lake and its amenities is from Highway 884.

The dam that impounds the reservoir was built in 1965 by the Prairie Farm Rehabilitation Administration (PFRA) for downstream irrigation. Control of the reservoir was handed over to the Special Areas Board in 1967.

== Blood Indian Park ==
Blood Indian Park was gounded in 1987 encompasses most of the lake. It has over 300 campsites, 37 of which are serviced. The park is divided into four blocks: North Block, West Block, East Block, and Overflow Block. Amenities at the lake include beaches, boat launches, ball diamonds, a camp kitchen, showers, a playground, sani-dump stations, and rodeo corrals. Most of the facilities are in or near the East Block.

== Fish species ==
Fish commonly found in Blood Indian Creek Reservoir include brook trout, Prussian carp, rainbow trout, brown trout, and tiger trout. The reservoir is stocked annually with 175,000 fingerling trout.

== See also ==
- List of lakes of Alberta
