= Gaar, Scott & Co. =

Defunct American agricultural machinery manufacturing company

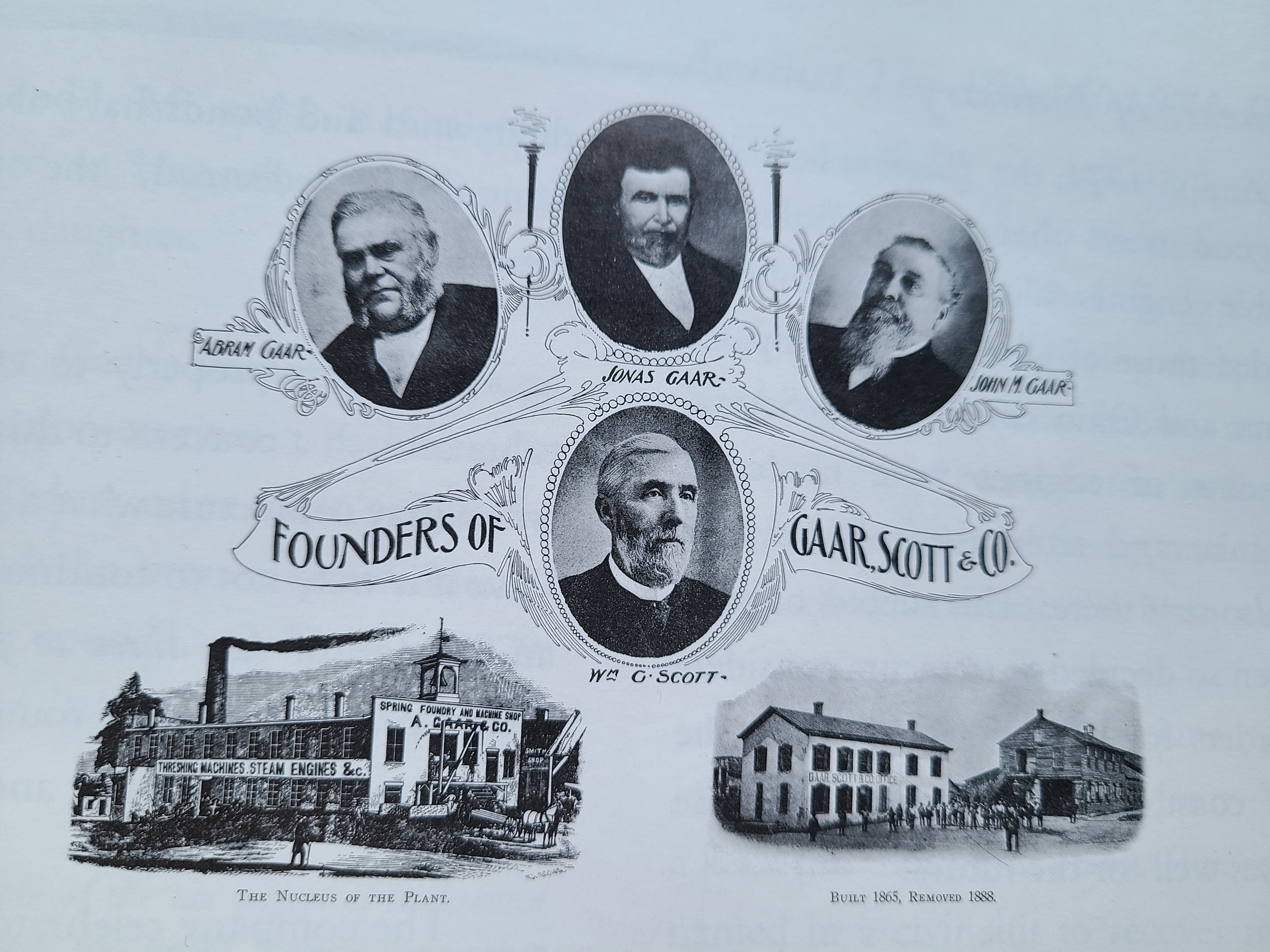
Abram Gaar, Jonas Gaar, John Milton Gaar, and William Scott

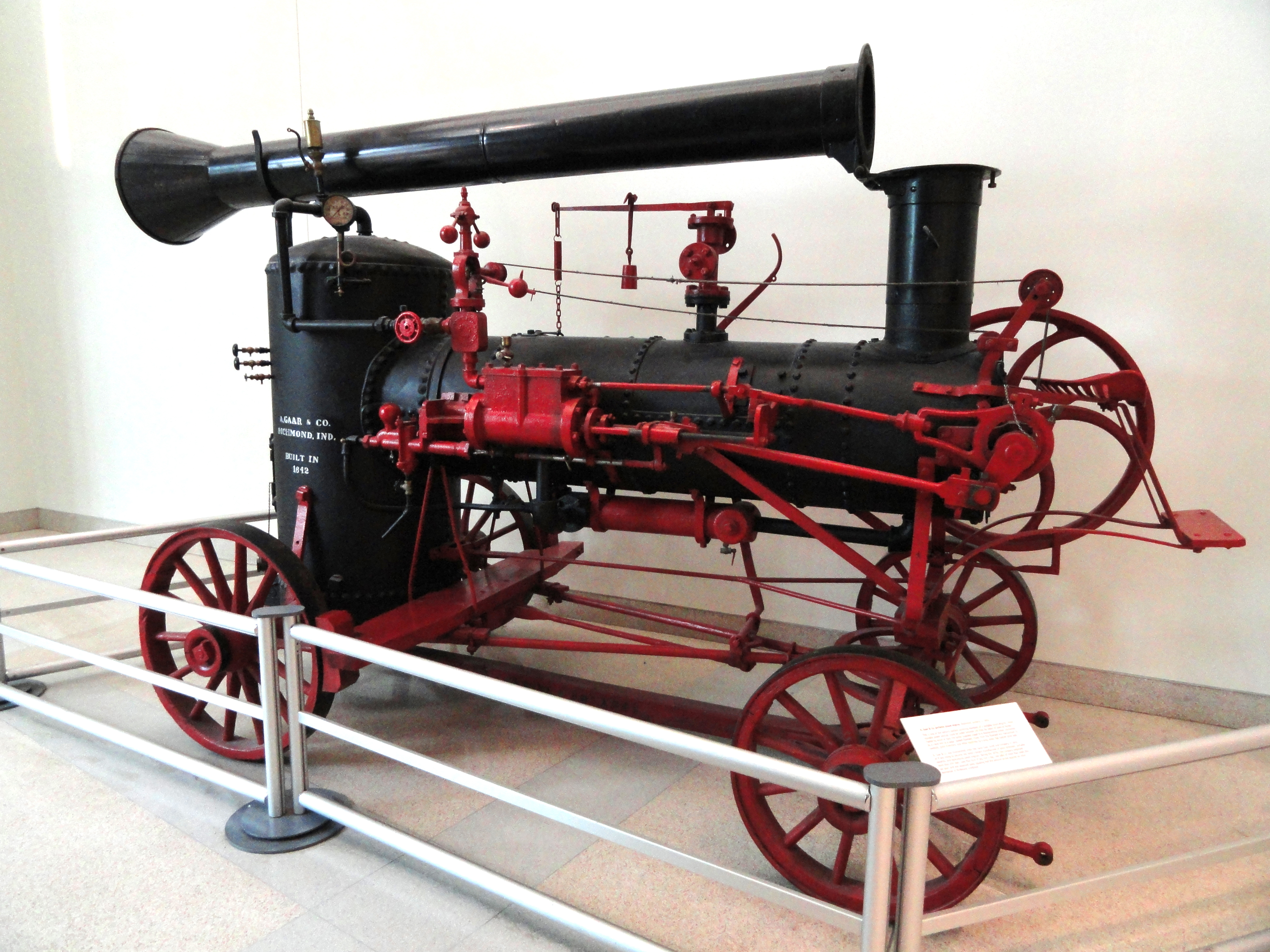
Abram Gaar & Co. portable engine of 1842

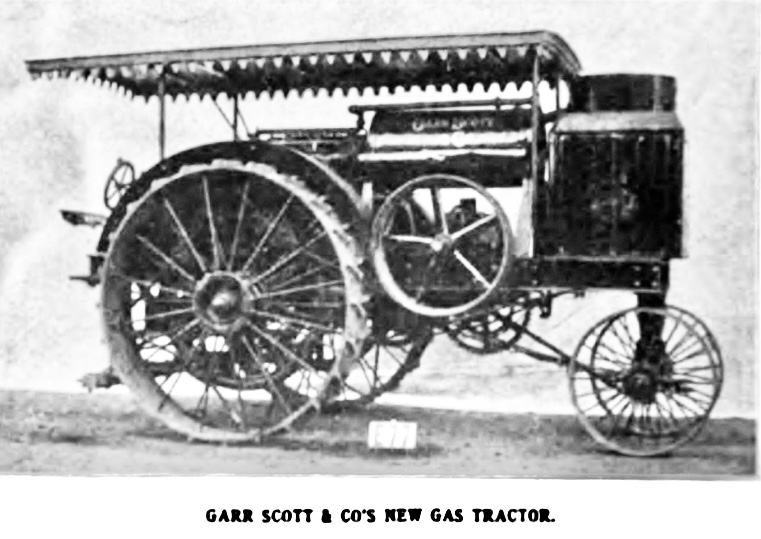
Gaar, Scott & Co. 22 hp (1911)

Gaar, Scott & Co. was an American threshing machine and steam traction engine builder founded in 1849 and based in Richmond, Indiana. The company built simple and compound engines in sizes from 10 to 50 horsepower. Farm machinery produced by the firm were advertised as part of "the Tiger Line" and used a tiger upon two globes as the company logo. In the Fall of 1869, A. Gaar & Co. won "Best Portable Farm Steam Engine" and "Best Eight Horse Power" at the 17th Illinois State Fair, for which it won two Silver Medal prizes. It merged with the M. Rumley Co. in 1911 during a purchasing frenzy that put the later firm into insolvency. The company was reorganized as Advance-Rumely Thresher Company Inc. Advance-Rumely Thresher Company was later purchased by Allis-Chalmers Mfg. Co.

The Abram Gaar House and Farm is listed on the National Register of Historic Places and open as a historic house museum. The Gaar-Scott office building, designed by noted architect John A. Hasecoster, still stands in Richmond and is the headquarters of Richmond Baking, a large commercial baker.

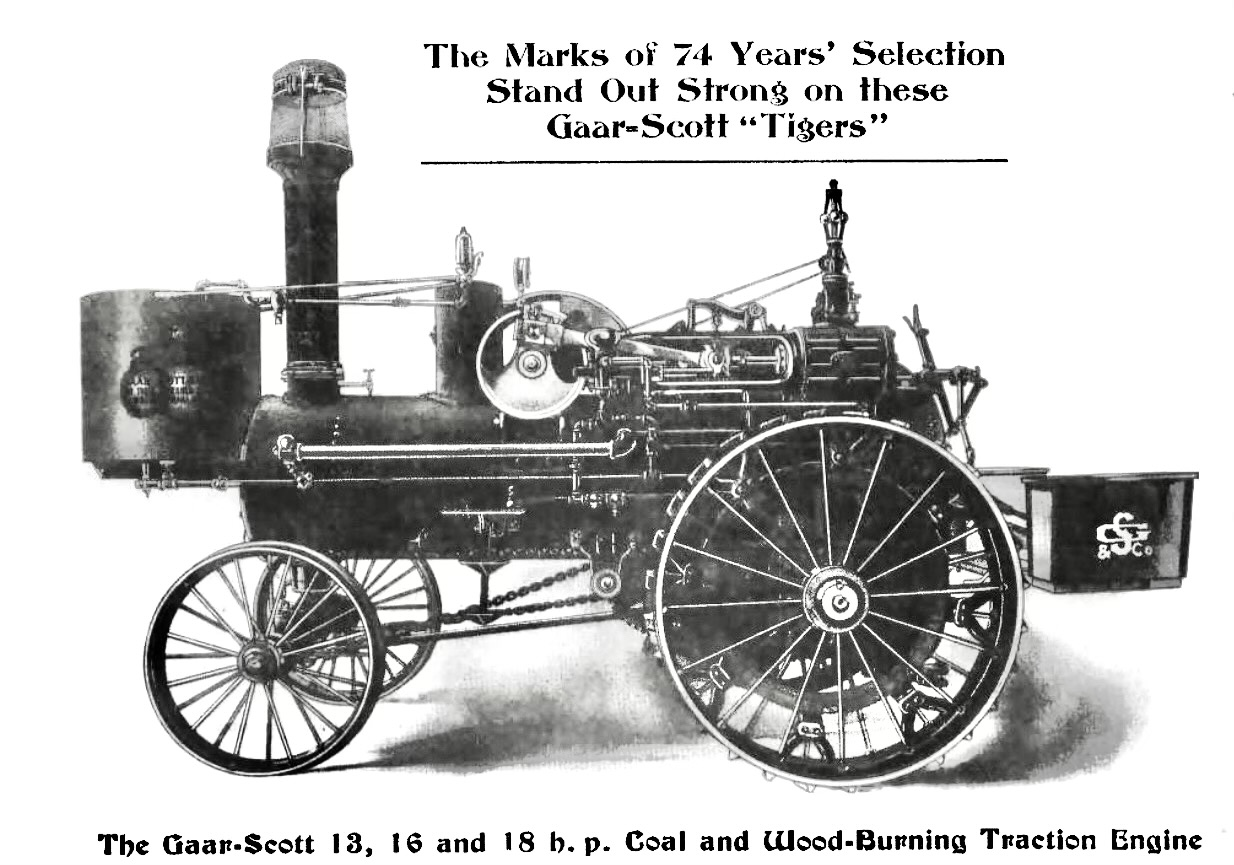
Gaar, Scott & Co. Tiger 13,16,18 hp

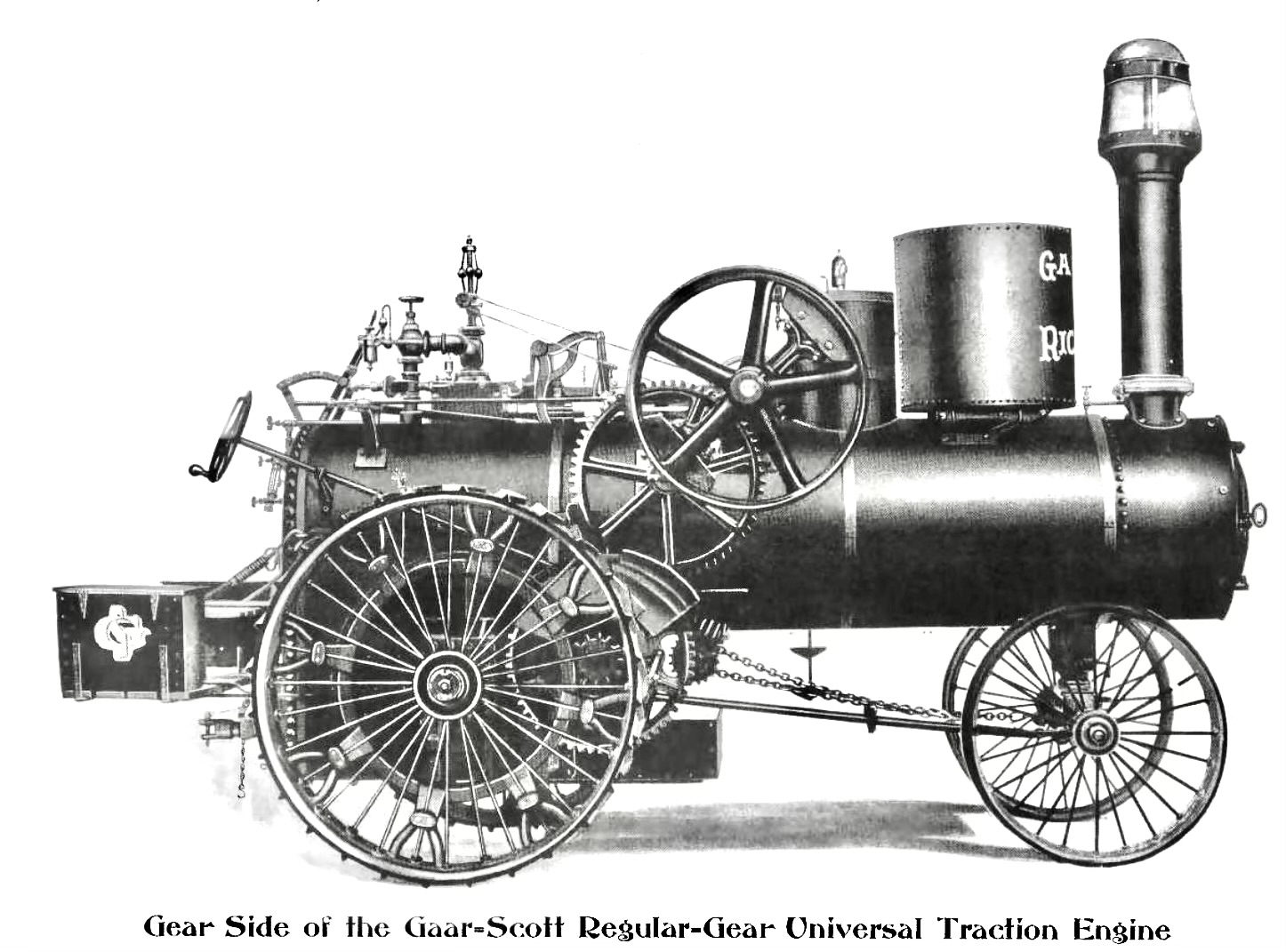
Gaar, Scott & Co. Regular Gear 16,18 hp

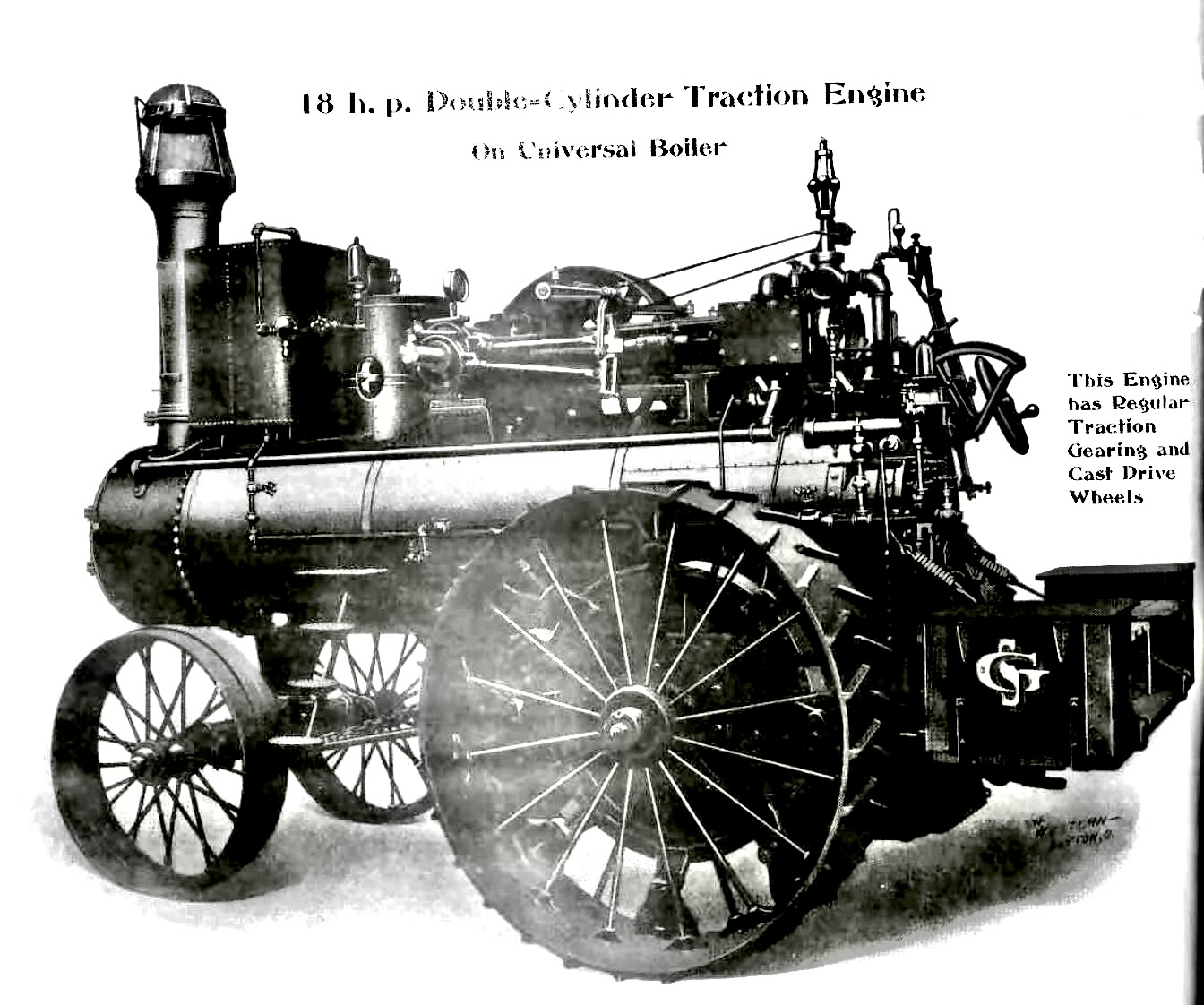
Gaar, Scott & Co. Double Cylinder 18 hp

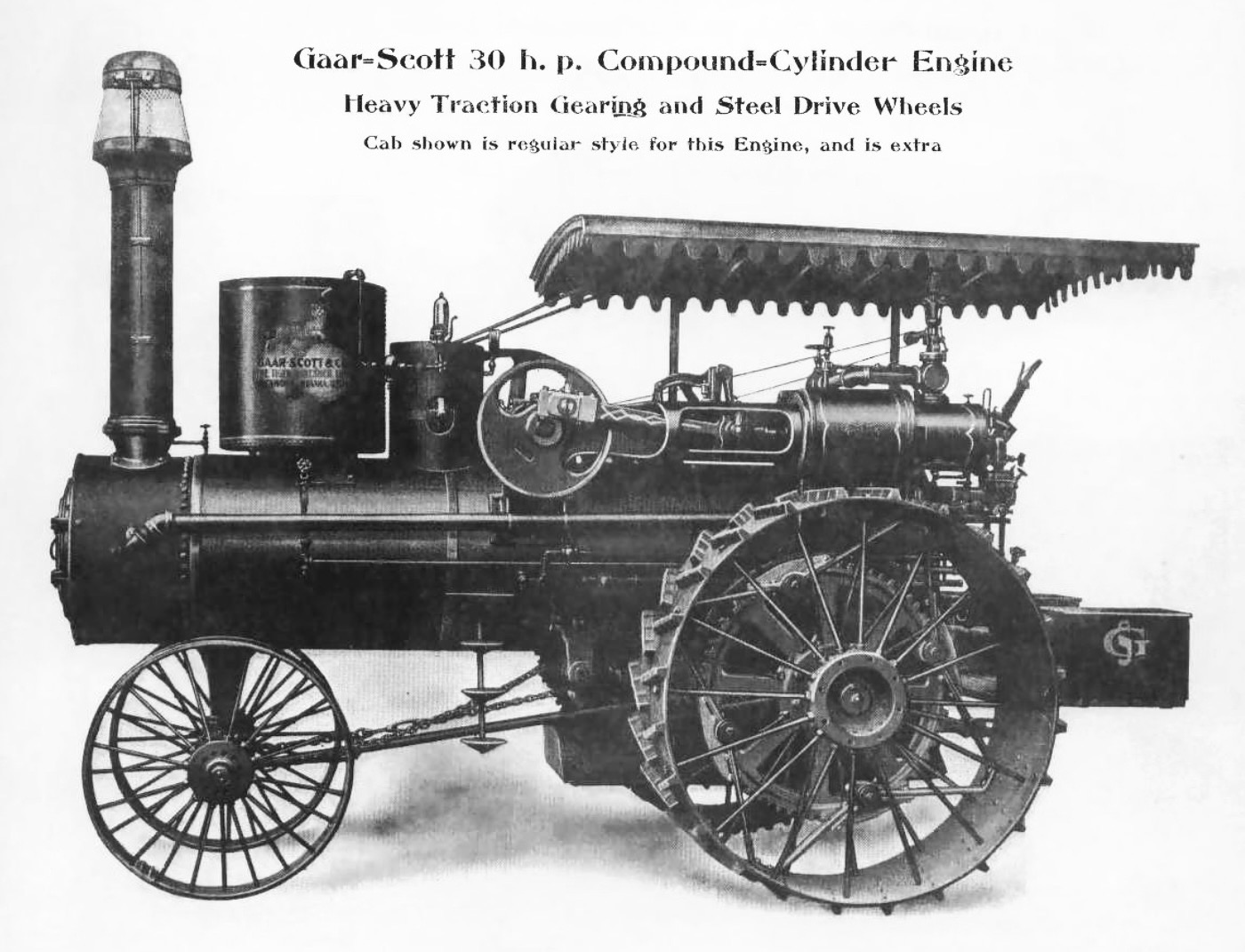
Gaar, Scott & Co. 30 hp

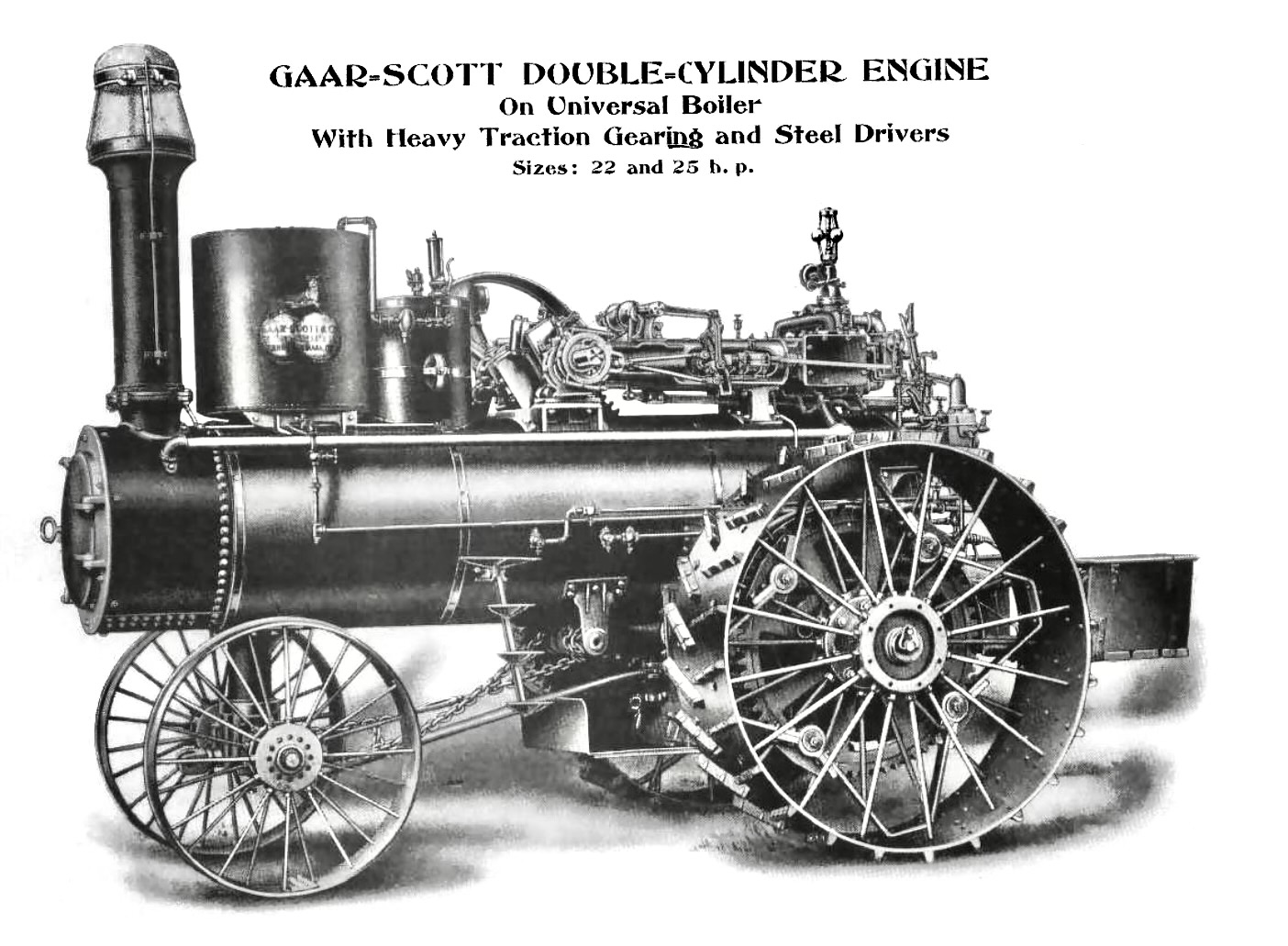
Gaar, Scott & Co. 22, 25 hp

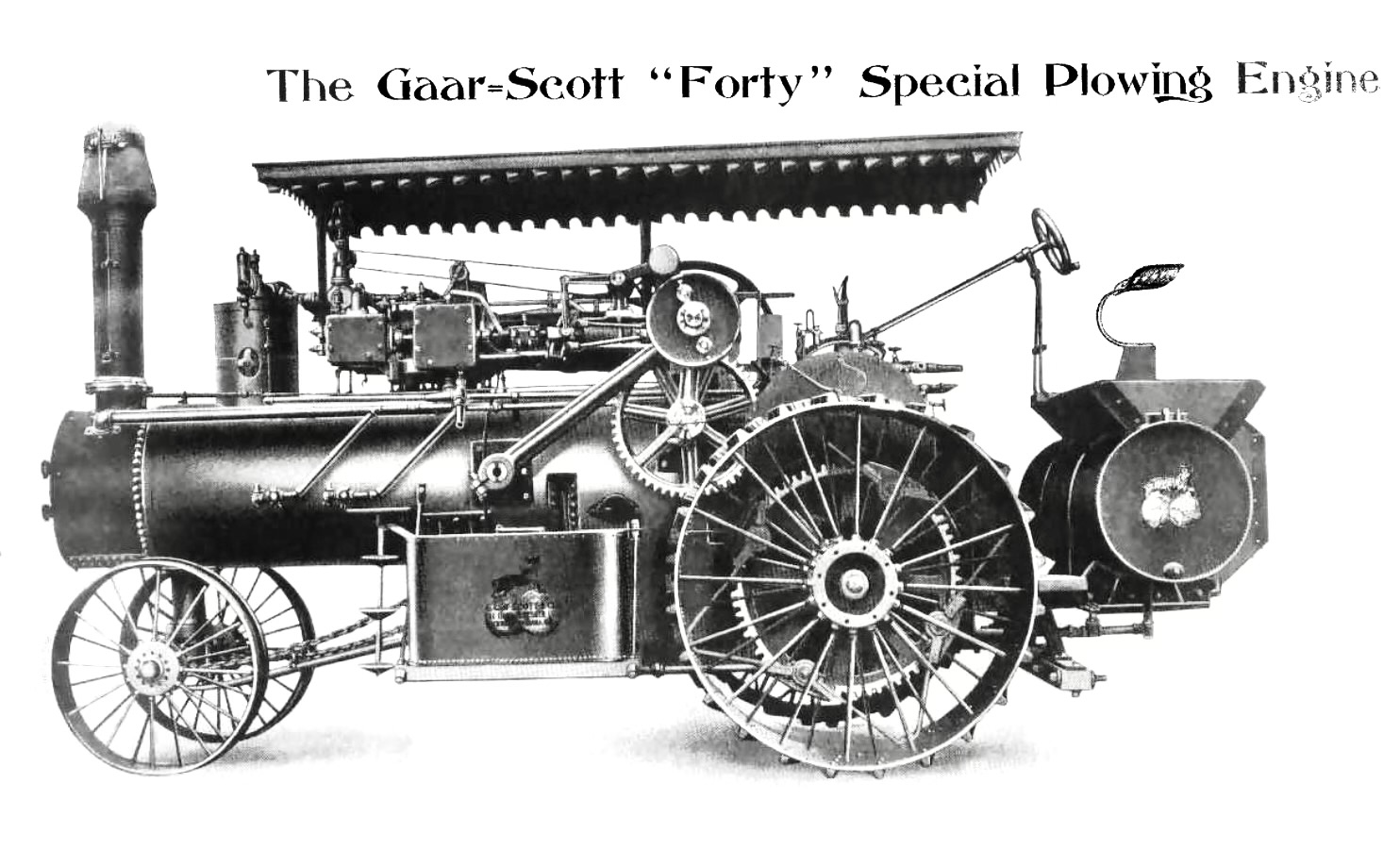
Gaar, Scott & Co. Forty

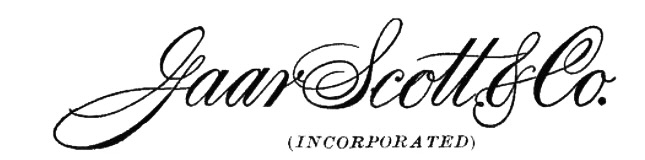
Gaar, Scott & Co. logo
