= Abram Gaar House and Farm =

Historic house in Indiana, United States

- U.S. National Register of Historic Places
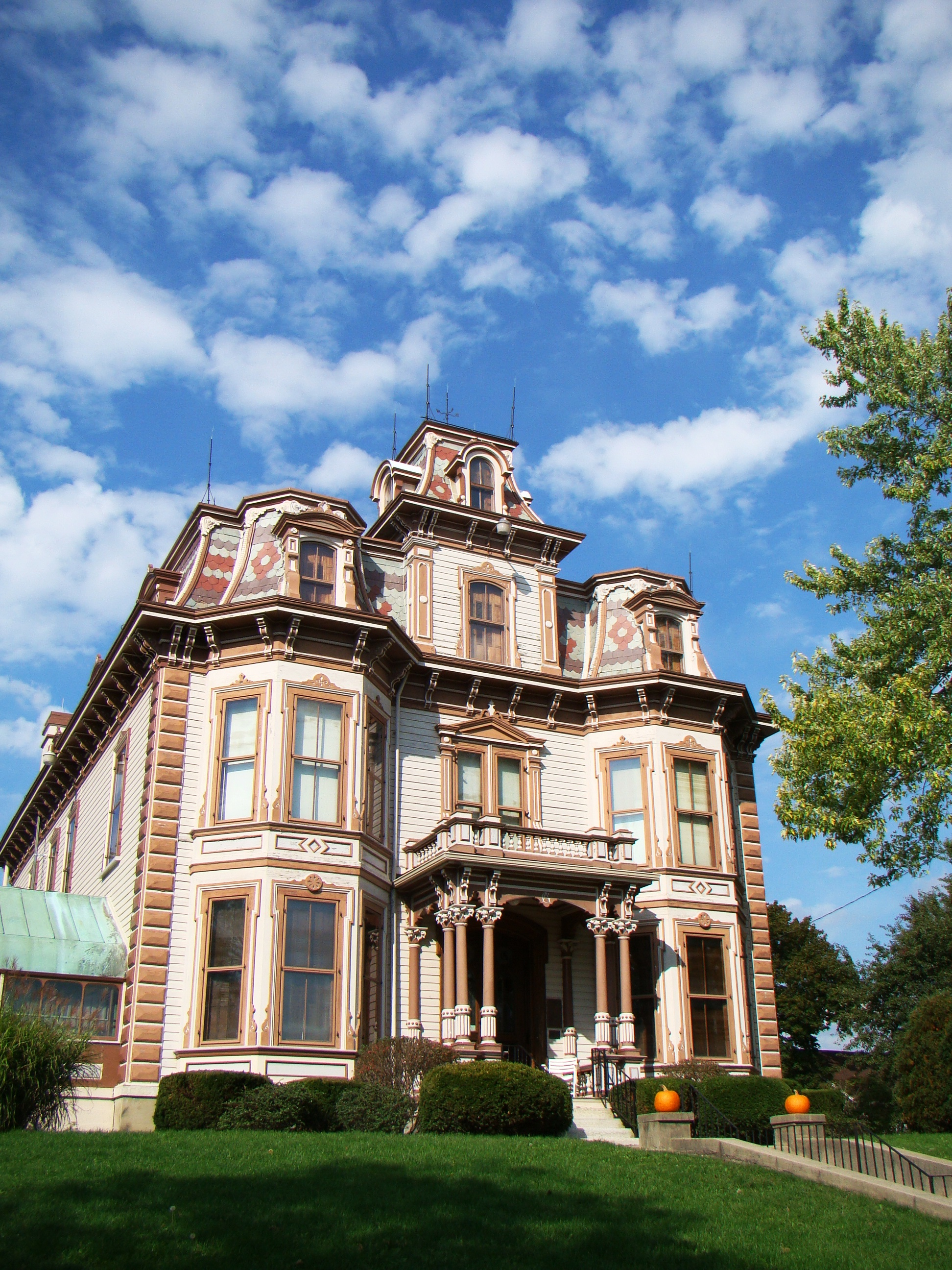

- Location within Indiana Location within the United States
- Location: 2411 Pleasant View Rd., Richmond, Indiana
- Coordinates: 39°50′57″N 84°52′0″W
- Area: 8 acres (3.2 ha)
- Built: 1878
- Architect: Hasecoster, John A.
- Architectural style: Late Victorian
- NRHP reference No.: 75000035
- Added to NRHP: February 20, 1975

The Abram Gaar House and Farm or known as the Gaar Mansion is a wooden Second Empire-style farm home located in Richmond, Indiana, built in 1876 and listed on the National Register of Historic Places.

== History ==
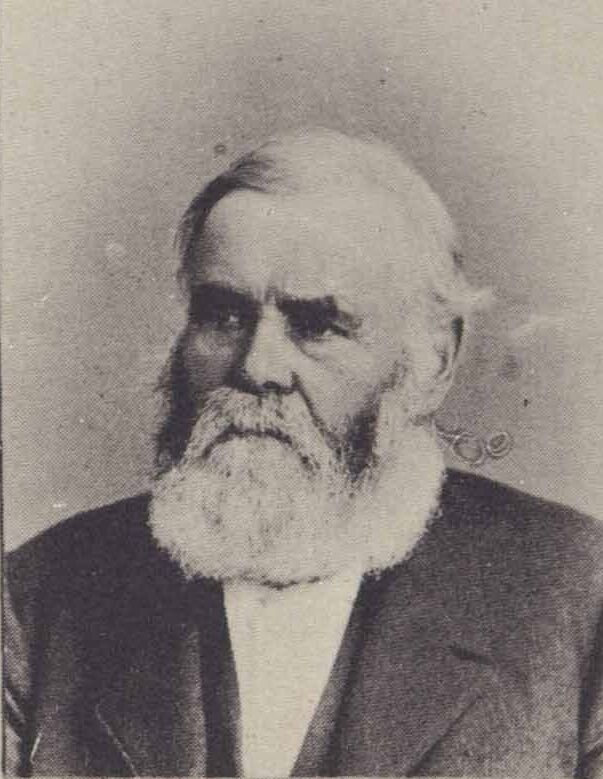
Gaar in an 1893 publication

The home was built by industrialist Abram Gaar, president of Gaar-Scott and Company, manufacturers of steam engines and threshing machines from 1842 to 1911. Total construction cost of the home was $20,000 it took eight months to build. The house is situated on a rise overlooking the city of Richmond from the north. Gaar hired John A. Hasecoster, the area's leading architect of the day to design the house and his original plans drawn on linen sheets are on display at the house today.

== Restoration ==
In the 1970s, Joanna Hill Mikesell, granddaughter of the builder and his wife Agnes restored the home which had remained in her family since it was built. Most of the original fabric of the house remains intact and historic windows, front porch fittings, and interior elements were found in storage on the property and returned to the house during restoration. She established the non-profit Agnes and Abram Gaar Foundation to assume ownership of the house, its contents and a few outbuildings. The Foundation operates the house as a historic house museum.

== Collection ==
The home holds a significant collection of Victorian decorative arts including nearly all the original Eastlake style furnishings, some of which were purchased from the 1876 Centennial Exposition in Philadelphia. Original bills of sale for furniture from Mitchell and Rammelsberg Furniture Company in Cincinnati, Ohio, are also part of the collection. in addition to the house and furnishings, the Foundation's collection holds a number of archival items relating to the history of the Gaar-Scott company and the Gaar family.
