= Benton, Alberta =

Hamlet in Alberta, Canada

Benton Benton Station
- Hamlet
- Etymology: Fort Benton, Montana
- Location of Benton in Special Area No. 3 Benton (Alberta)
- Coordinates: 51.348286°N 110.349383°W
- Country: Canada
- Province: Alberta
- Region: Central Alberta
- Census division: No. 4
- Special Area: Special Area No. 3

Government
  - Type: Unincorporated
  - Governing body: Special Areas Board
- Time zone: UTC−06:00 (Alberta Time)

Benton, also known as Benton Station, is a hamlet located in Special Area No. 3 in Alberta, Canada. It is approximately 9 km (5.6 mi) east of the town of Oyen and approximately 24.5 km (15.2 mi) west of the border with Saskatchewan. The name originates from Fort Benton which, in turn is named after Thomas Hart Benton. The hamlet at one point had a post office and a CNR station.

== See also ==
- List of hamlets in Alberta
- List of ghost towns in Alberta
