= Lanfine, Alberta =

Hamlet in Alberta, Canada

Lanfine
- Hamlet
- Location of Lanfine in Special Area No. 3 Lanfine (Alberta)
- Coordinates: 51.380686°N 110.689595°W
- Country: Canada
- Province: Alberta
- Region: Central Alberta
- Census division: No. 4
- Special Area: Special Area No. 3

Government
  - Type: Unincorporated
  - Governing body: Special Areas Board
- Time zone: UTC−06:00 (Alberta Time)

Lanfine is a hamlet located in Special Area No. 3 in Alberta, Canada. It is named after the Lanfine House in Ayrshire, Scotland near the home of the first postmaster.

== See also ==
- List of hamlets in Alberta
