= Advance-Rumely =

American pioneering producer of agricultural machinery

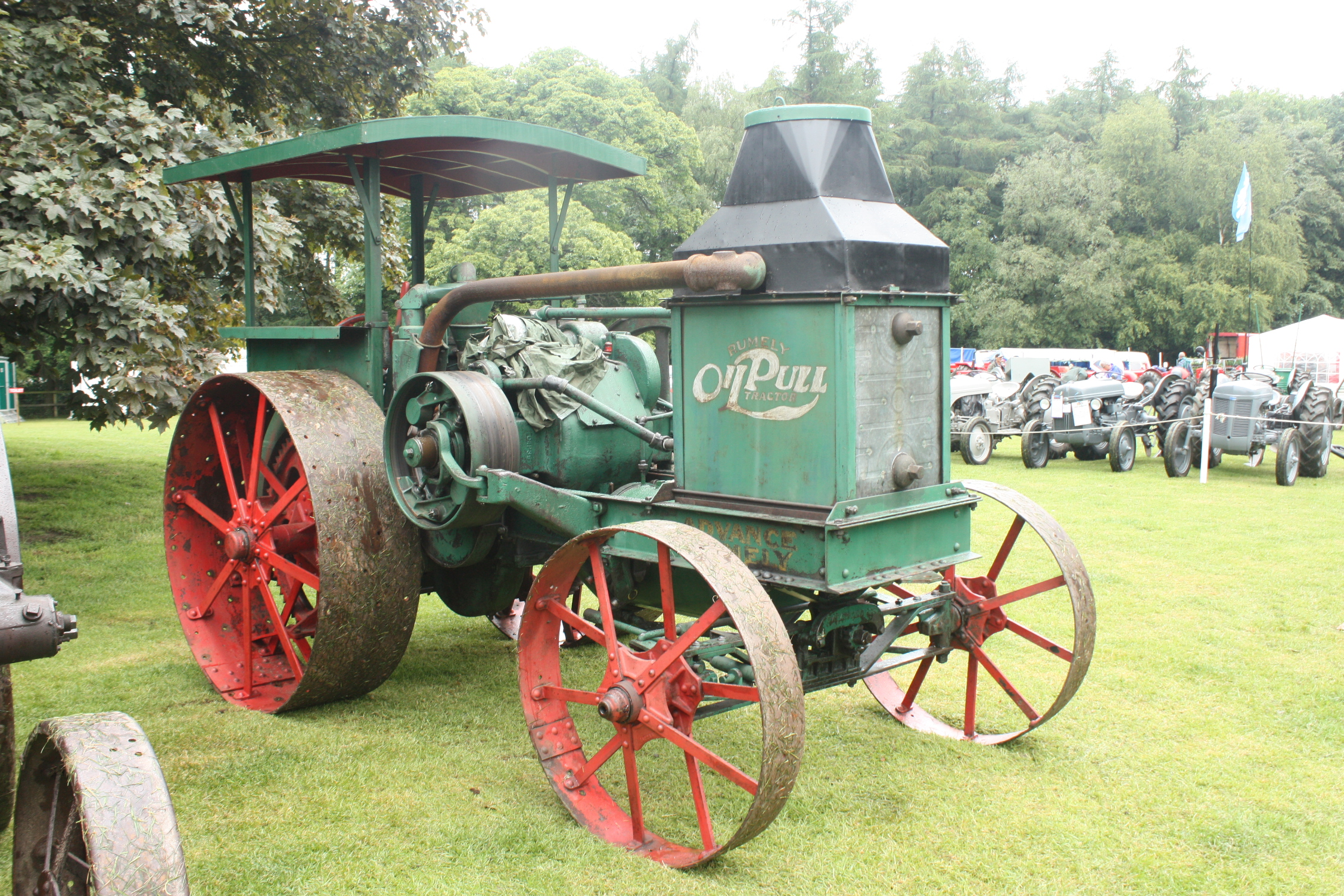
- Rumely OilPull model H
- Founded: 1853; 173 years ago
- Fate: Purchased by Allis-Chalmers in 1931.
- Headquarters: La Porte, Indiana

The Advance-Rumely Company of La Porte, Indiana was an American pioneering producer of many types of agricultural machinery, most notably threshing machines and large tractors. Started in 1853 manufacturing threshers and later moved on to steam engines. Allis-Chalmers Manufacturing Co. purchased Advance-Rumley in 1931. The company's main works would become what was later known as the "La Porte plant".

Thanks to various mergers and acquisitions, the company's origins stretched as far back as 1853. However, the origin of the two components of the corporate name—Advance Thresher Company and M. Rumely Company—were somewhat newer, though still long-lived in the agricultural equipment industry. The company was organized under the name Advance-Rumely in 1915.

== History ==
=== Advance Thresher and M. Rumely ===
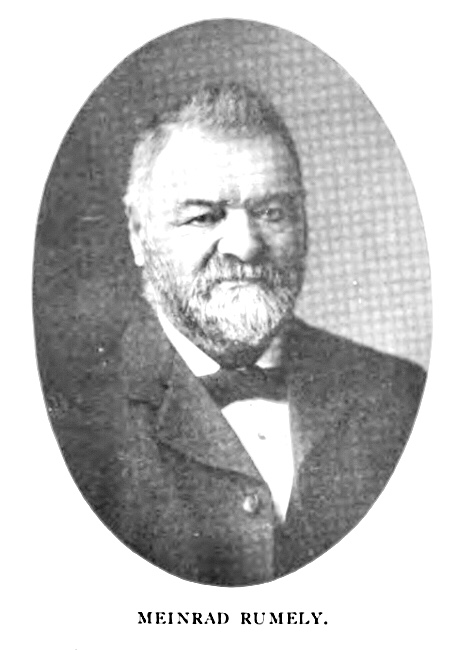
Meinrad Rumely (February 9, 1823 – March 31, 1904)

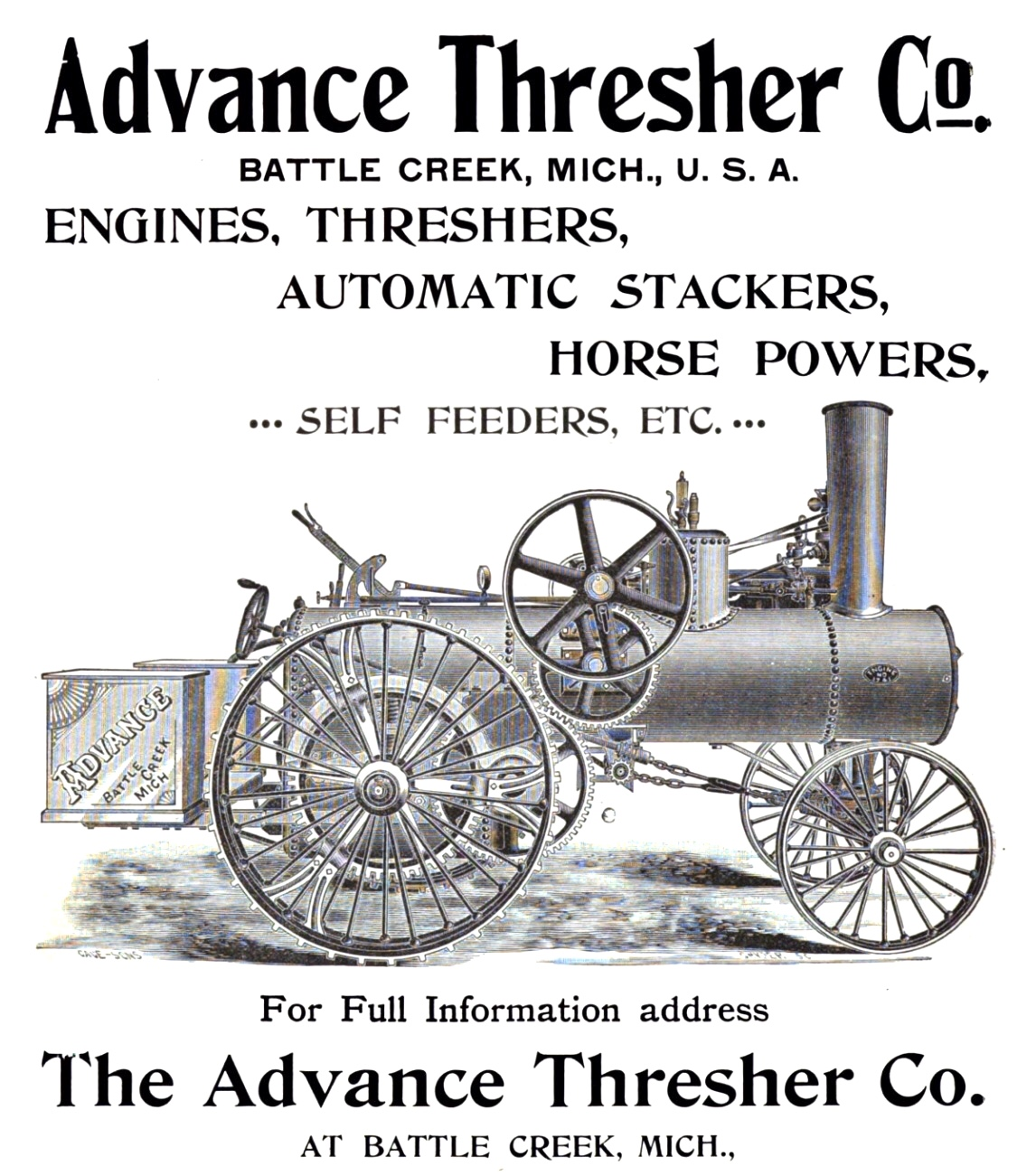
Advance Thresher Company advertisement (1901)

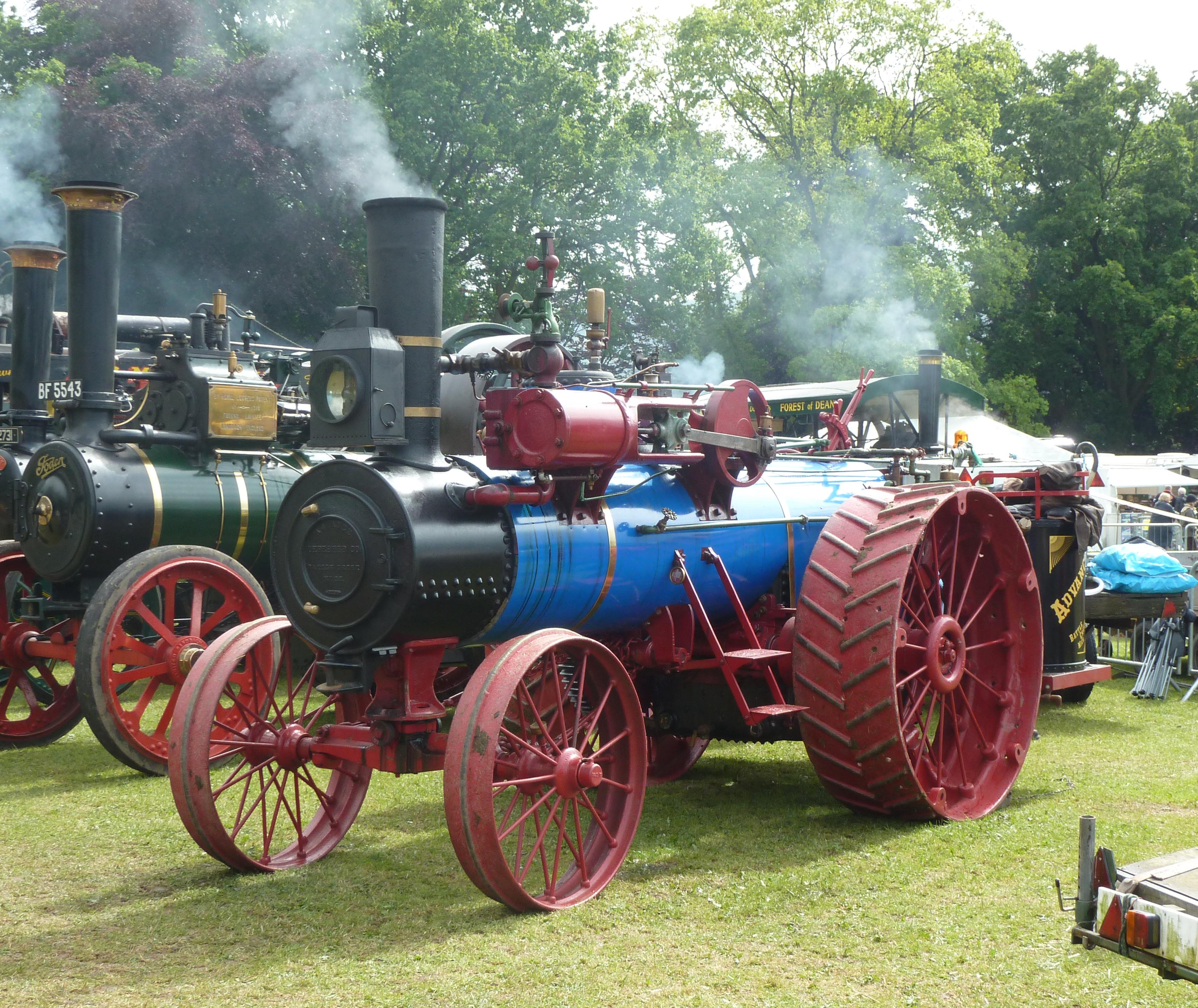
Advance Thresher Co. steam traction engine

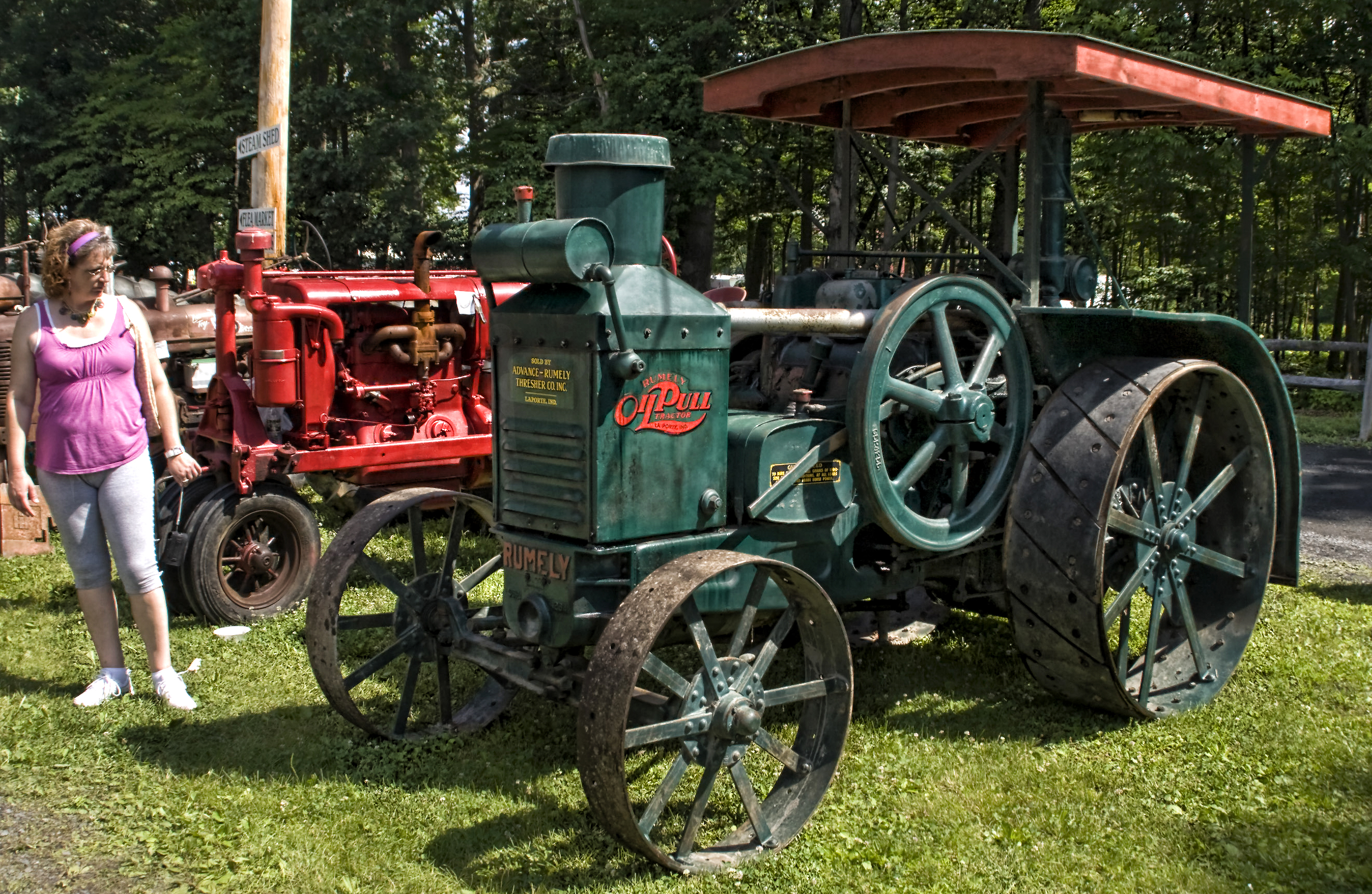
Rumely Oil Pull tractor

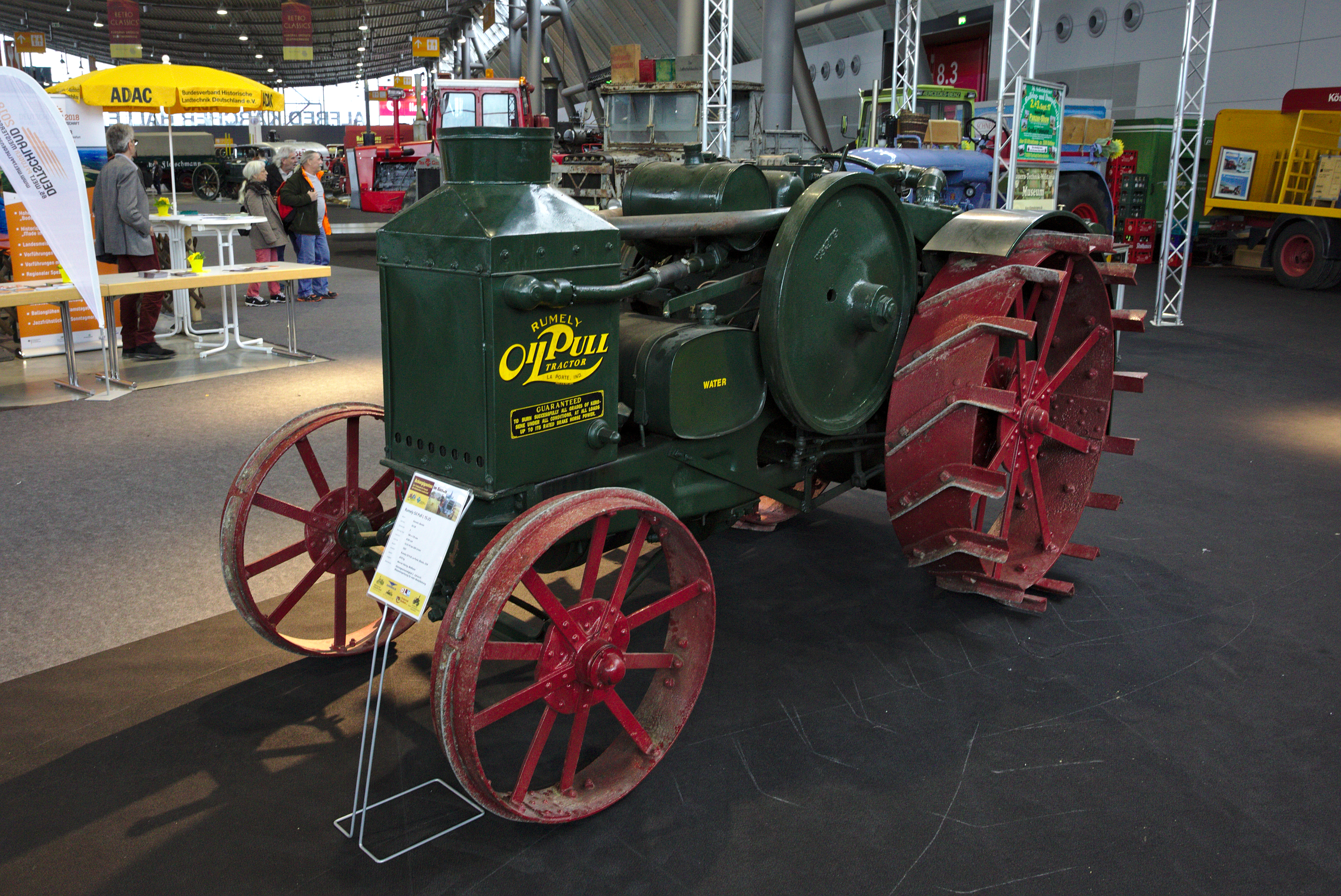
Rumely Oil Pull tractor "L"

Rumely Oil Pull tractor movie

Meinrad Rumely emigrated from Germany in 1848, joining his brother John Rumely in the operation of a foundry in La Porte, Indiana. This operation had expanded by 1859 into the production of corn shellers and complete threshing machines powered by horses. Following success in this new field, Meinrad then bought out his brother's portion of the business and incorporated it as the M. Rumely Company by 1887. In 1895, the line expanded to include steam-powered traction engines. Meinrad died in 1904, but his sons continued to manage the business. Rumely's most famous product, the Rumely Oil Pull tractors, powered by an internal combustion engine using kerosene, was first developed in 1909 and began selling to the public by 1910.

Meanwhile, Advance Thresher Company was founded in 1881 with a factory in Battle Creek, Michigan. In addition to their namesake threshing machines, this company was a prolific producer of steam traction engines.

=== Acquisitions and mergers ===
From 1911 to 1912, M. Rumely Company began purchasing other firms in the agricultural equipment business. Both Advance Thresher Company and Gaar-Scott & Company of Richmond, Indiana were acquired during 1911. Then, in 1912, Rumely expanded further with the purchase of Northwest Thresher Company of Stillwater, Minnesota and the American-Abell Engine & Thresher Company of Toronto.

All these companies were first reorganized in 1913 as two connected firms: the existing M. Rumely Co. Inc. (effectively the manufacturing side), and the new Rumely Products Co. (the sales and distribution side). A further reorganization brought about the final Advance-Rumely Company by 1915, a move which both streamlined the organization and highlighted its famous forebears. Advance-Rumely hadn't quite finished its expansion goals, either: the Aultman-Taylor Company of Mansfield, Ohio was picked up in 1923.

Production figures steam tractors Aultman-Taylor

Year	Production figures	Model	Serial number
1890	255		
1891	340		
1892	350		
1893	250		
1894	110		
1895	120		
1896	220		
1897	140		
1898	210		
1899	260		
1900	180		
1901	190		
1902	230		
1903	200		
1904	260		
1905	250		
1906	320		
1907	250		
1908	90		
1909	170		
1910	250		
1911	165		
1912	150		
1913	170		
1914	280		
1915	195		
1916	50		
1917	40		
1918	60		
1919	50		
1920	40		
1921	25		
Sum	5,870		

=== Consolidation and takeover ===
Despite all of the history and diversity in engineering acquired along with all of their corporate assets during the 1910s, most of this was left by the wayside as Advance-Rumely sought to fold everything under its new brand name or that of Rumely. The general financial collapse of the Great Depression, beginning in 1929 and into the early 1930s, began to take its toll on Advance-Rumely.

As early as January 1930, the Rumely management began seeking a buyer for the company. Correspondence with Otto Falk, president of the Allis-Chalmers Manufacturing Company, proved fruitful. Allis-Chalmers agreed to take over the firm and did so by May 1931.

Rumely had discontinued its traction engine lines in favor of newer-style tractors. But Allis-Chalmers had a line of those that was quite successful. The remaining Rumely-branded tractors were discontinued. Allis-Chalmers was more interested in Advance-Rumely's line of threshing and harvesting machines (not to mention the sprawling plants that built them). Also, Allis-Chalmers bought Rumely's extensive dealer network, and instantly converted to the complete Allis-Chalmers product line. The "La Porte plant", as Advance-Rumely's main headquarters was now called, became known as the "Harvester Capitol of the World" thanks to its eventual production of Allis-Chalmers' successful All-Crop harvester line.

Allis-Chalmers would eventually succumb to bankruptcy and the dismantling of its vast business interests in 1985. But, by that time Advance-Rumely was only a memory.

== Products ==
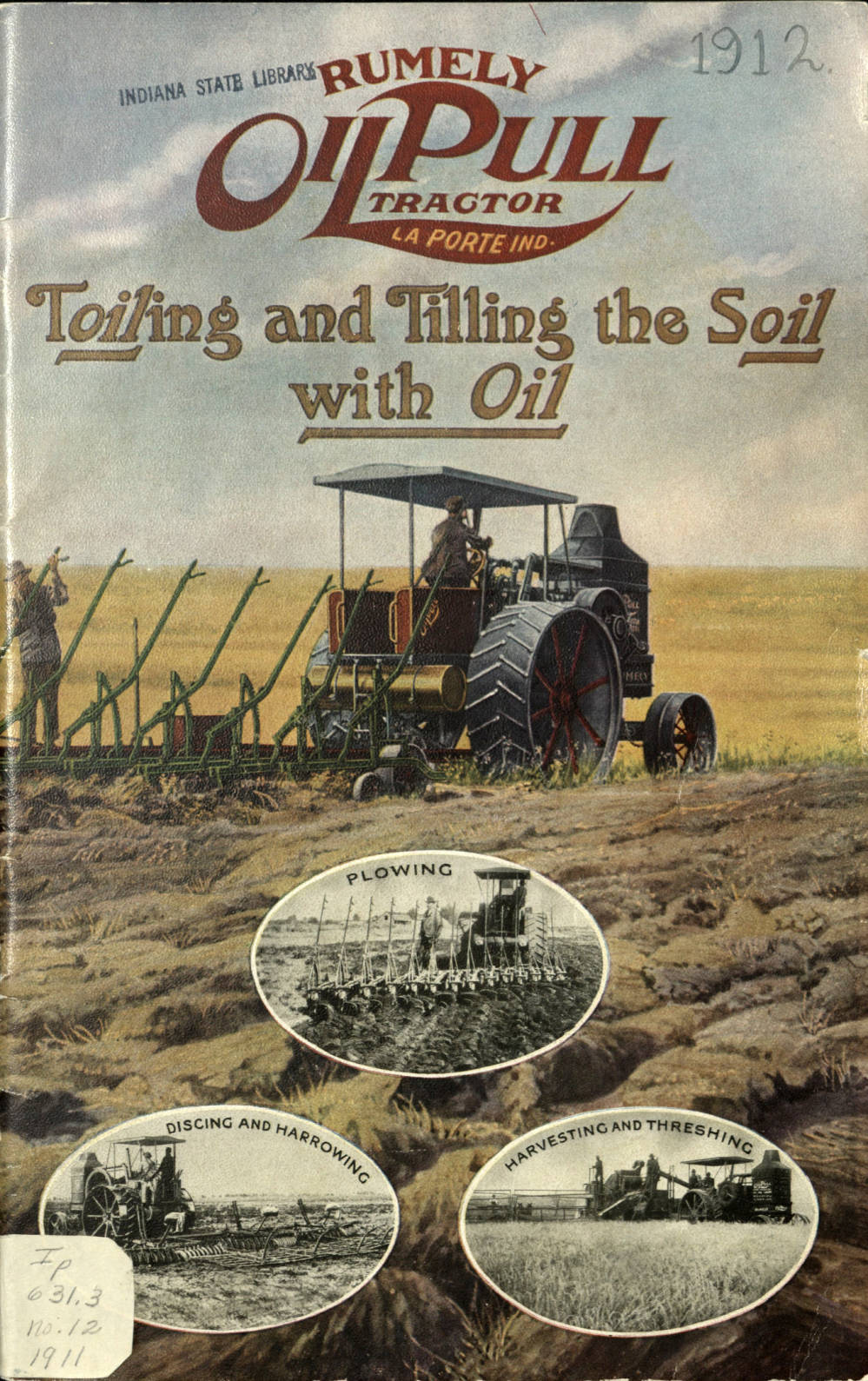
Rumely oilpull catalog 1911

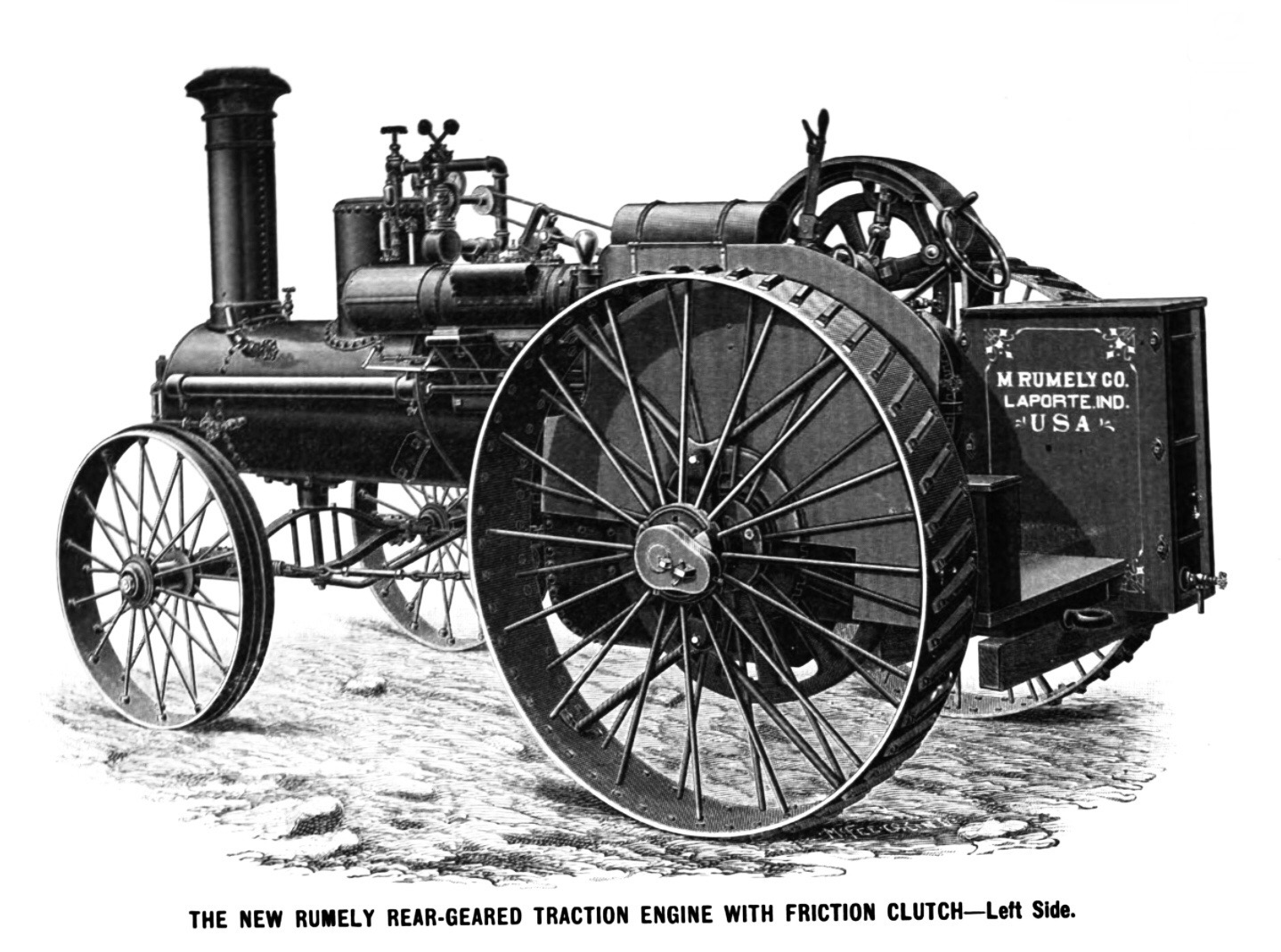
Rumely Steam Tractor 8,10 or 12 hp (1891)

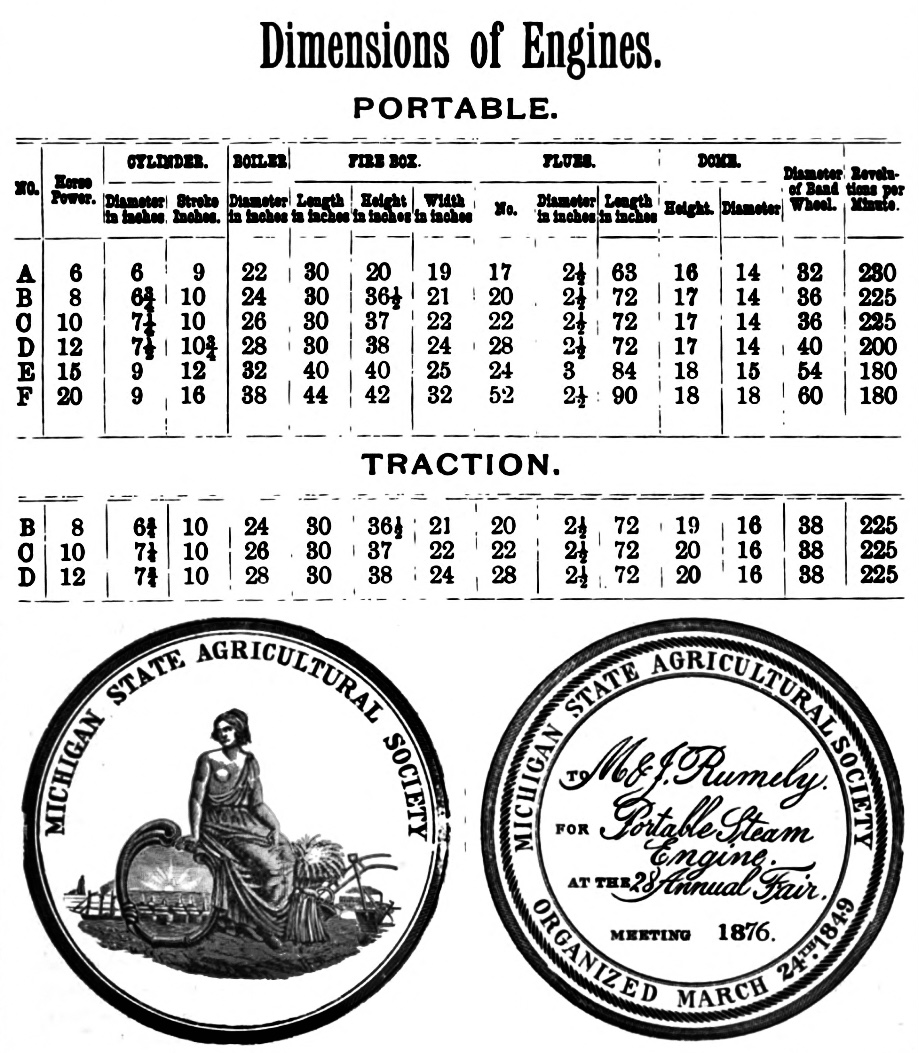
Rumely Dimensions of Steam Engines (1891)

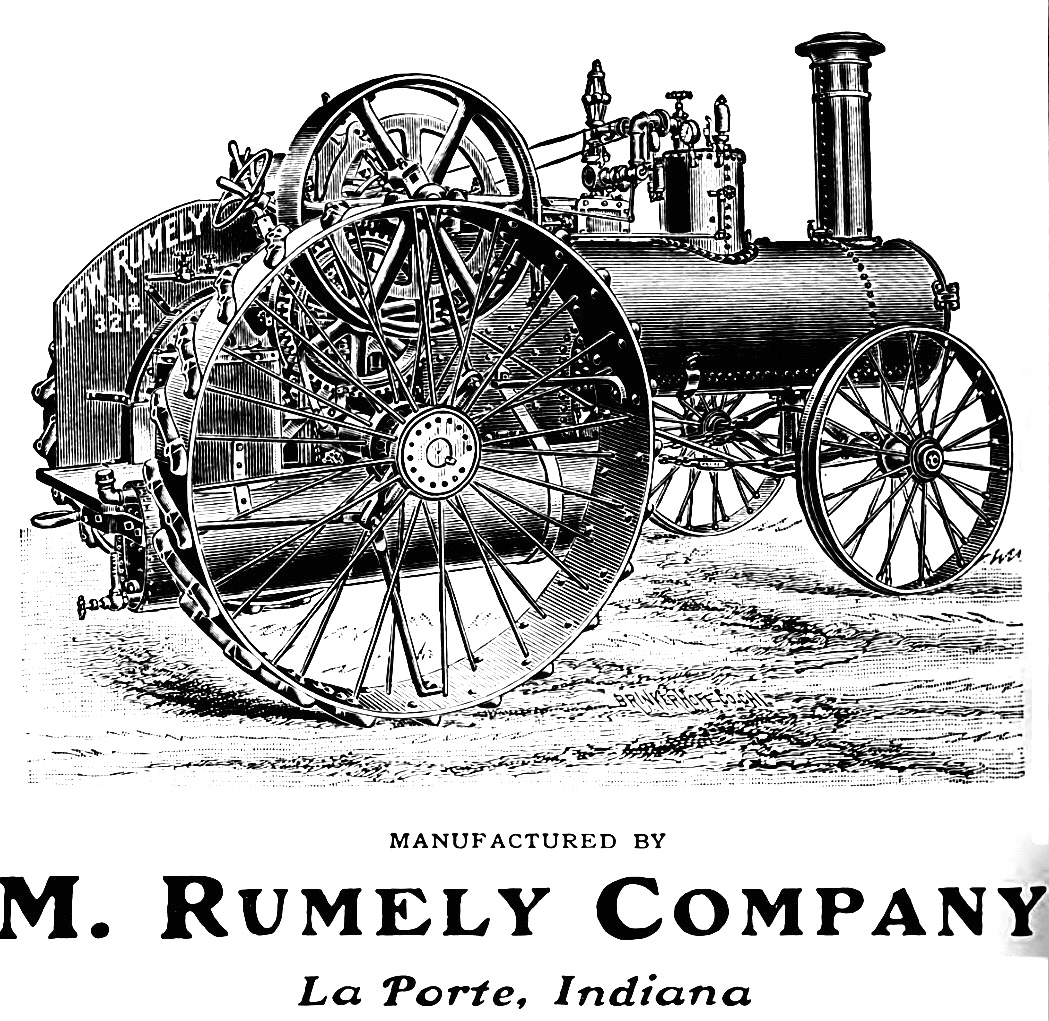
Rumely Steam Tractor No. 3214 (1898)

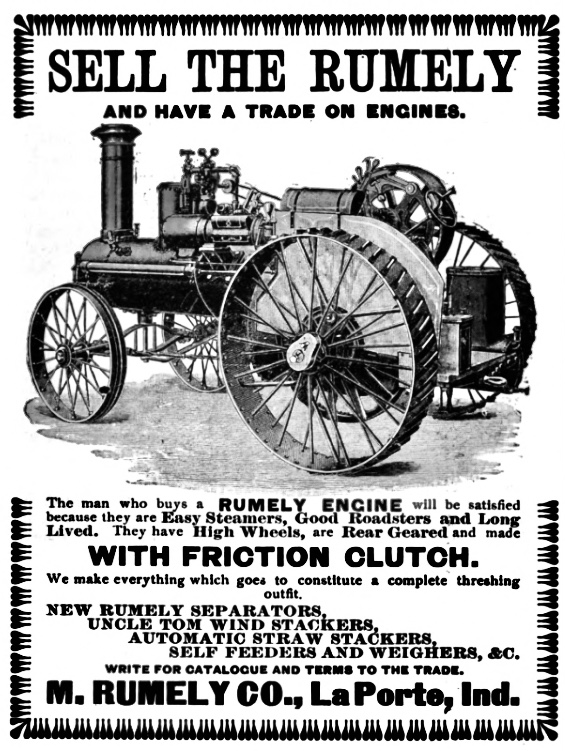
Rumely Steam Tractor advertisement (1898)

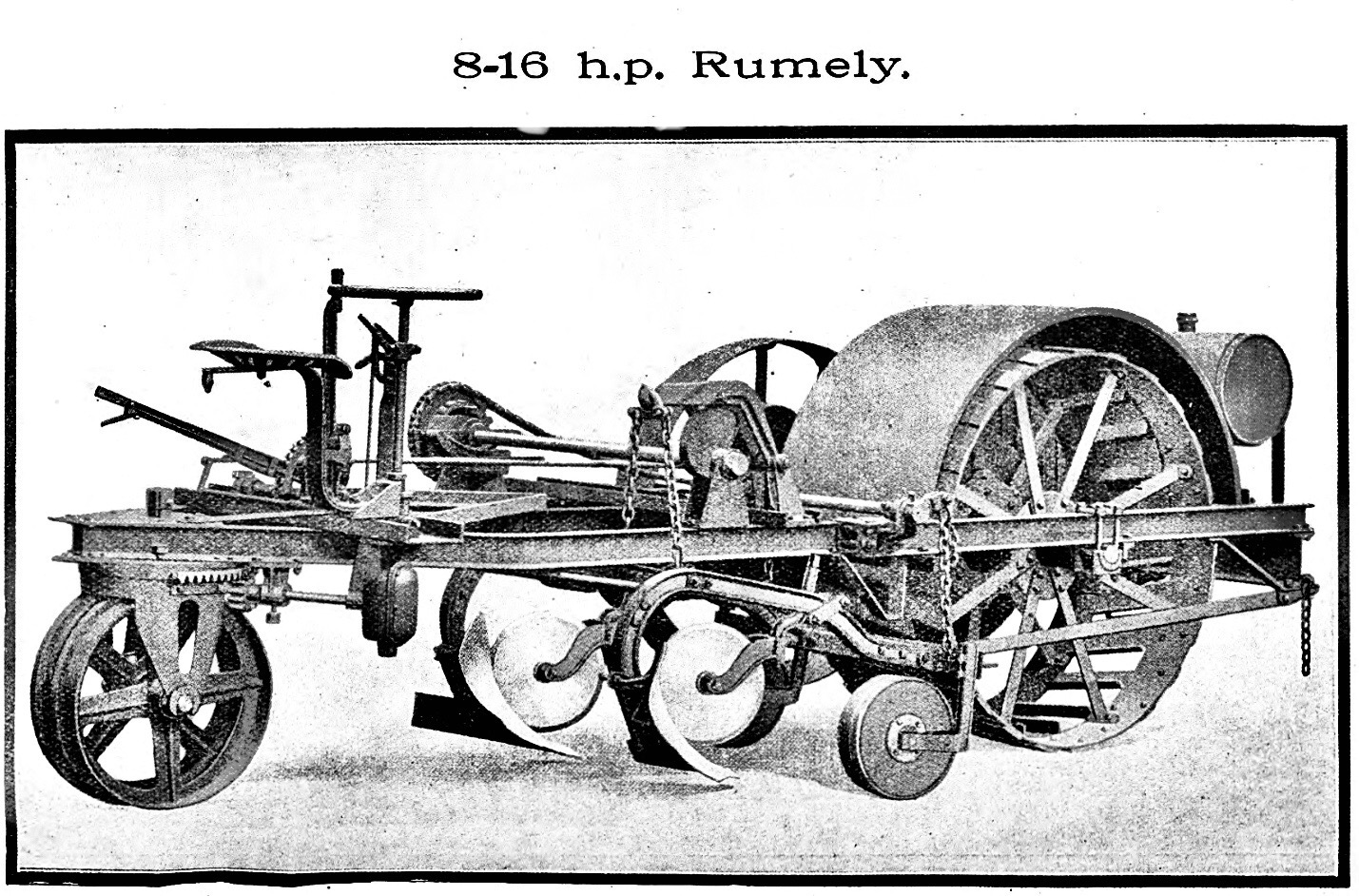
Rumely 8-16 (1915–1916)

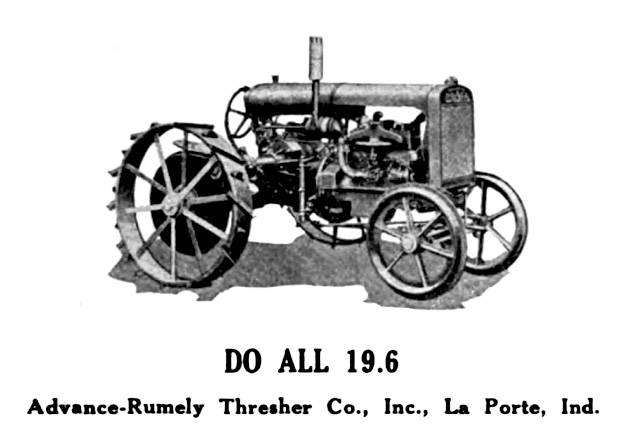
Advance-Rumely DoAll (1928–1932)

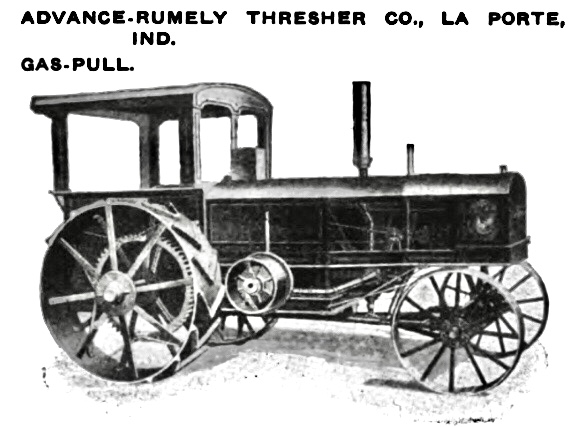
Advance-Rumely GasPull 15-30 (1917)

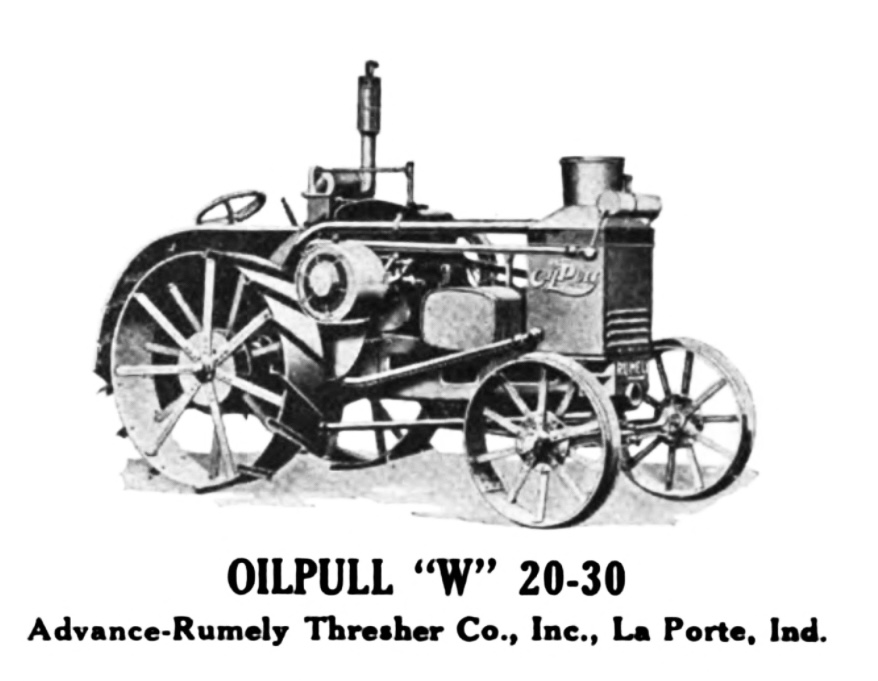
Advance-Rumely Oil Pull W20-30 (1928–1930)

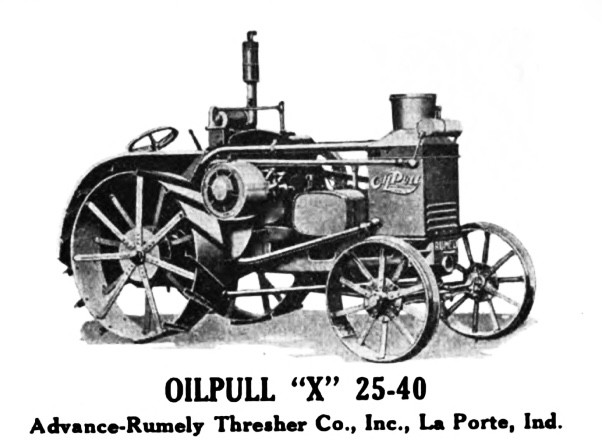
Advance-Rumely Oil Pull X25-40 (1928–1930)

The following is representative of the bulk of Advance-Rumely's production and that of some of its predecessors.

=== Traction engines and tractors ===
- Advance Traction Engine (1885–1917)
- Gaar-Scott Traction Engine (1885–1914)
- Rumely Steam Tractor 8-12 hp (1891–?)
- Rumely DoAll (1928–1932) 22 hp
- Rumely GasPull (~1917) 30 hp
- Rumely 8-16 (1915–1916)
- Rumely Oil Pull B25/45 (1910–1912) 50 hp
- Rumely Oil Pull E30/60 (1910–1923) 84 hp
- Rumely Oil Pull F15/30 (1911–1918) 33 hp
- Rumely Oil Pull G20/40 (1918–1924) 44 hp
- Rumely Oil Pull H16/30 (1917–1924) 33 hp
- Rumely Oil Pull K12/20 (1918–1924) 40 hp
- Rumely Oil Pull L15/25 (1924–1927) 27 hp
- Rumely Oil Pull M20/35 (1924–1927) 38 hp
- Rumely Oil Pull R25/45 (1924–1927) 50 hp
- Rumely Oil Pull S30/60 (1924–1928) 66 hp
- Rumely Oil Pull W20/30 (1928–1930) 33 hp
- Rumely Oil Pull X25/40 (1928–1930) 44 hp
- Rumely Oil Pull Y30/50 (1929) 55 hp
- Rumely Oil Pull Z40/60 (1929) 77 hp
- Rumely Six/6A (1930–1931) 47 hp
- Rumely Traction Engine (1895–1916)
- Rumely Truck (1918–????)

Each Oil Pull also had an associated Oil Turn stationary engine.

Production figures steam tractors Rumely

Year	Production figures	Model	Serial number
1890			
1891		8 hp; 10 hp; 12 hp	
1892			
1893			
1894			
1895	126		2600-2725
1896	153		2726-2878
1897	171		2879-3049
1898	169		3050-3218
1899	218		3219-3437
1900	343		3438-3640
1901	215		3641-3855
1902	281		3856-4136
1903	238		4137-4374
1904	?		
1905	?		
1906	?		
1907	?		
1908	?		
1909	?		
1910	333		5588-5920
1911	367		5921-6287
1912	301		6288-6588
1913	126		6589-6714
1914	322		6715-7036
1915	2		7037-7038
1916	1		7039
Sum	7,039		

Production figures OilPull tractors Rumely

Year	Production figures	Model	Serial number
1910	100; 136	B 25-45; E 30-60	1-100; 101-236
1911	169; 510; 3,856 (1911-1918)	B 25-45; E 30-60; F 15-30	2,101-2,269; 237-746; .
1912	667; 932; .	B 25-45; E 30-60; F 15-30	2,270-2,936; 747-1,678; .
1913	109; .	E 30-60; F 15-30	1,679-1,787; .
1914	0; .	E 30-60; F 15-30	none built; .
1915	200; .	E 30-60; F 15-30	1,819-2,018; .
1916	82; .	E 30-60; F 15-30	2,019-2,100; .
1917	5,728; .; 13,074 (1917-1924); .	E 30-60; F 15-30; H 16-30	2,997-8,724; .; .; .
1918	178; .; 8,066 (1918-1924); .; .; .	E 30-60; F 15-30; G 20-40; H 16-30	8,725-8,902; .; .; .; .; .
1919	97; .; .; .; .	E 30-60; G 20-40; H 16-30	11,500-11,596; .; .; .; .
1920	100; .; .; .; .	E 30-60; G 20-40; H 16-30	2,252-2,351; .; .; .; .
1921	51; .; .; .; .	E 30-60; G 20-40; H 16-30	2,352-2,402; .; .; .; .
1922	50; .; .; .; .	E 30-60; G 20-40; H 16-30	2,404-2,453; .; .; .; .
1923	50; .; .; .; .	E 30-60; G 20-40; H 16-30	2,454-2,503; .; .; .; .
1924	.; .; .; .; 4	G 20-40; H 16-30; S 30-60	.; .; .; .; 1-4
1925	30	S 30-60	5-34
1926	200	S 30-60	35-234
1927	200	S 30-60	235-434
1928	80	S 30-60	435-514
1929	45; 215	Y 30-50; Z 40-60	1-45; 1-215
1930			
1931			
Sum	58,436		

=== Combine harvesters ===
- Advance-Rumely Number 1 Combine (1925–1929)
- Advance-Rumely Number 2 Combine (1926–1930)
- Advance-Rumely Number 3 Combine (1927–1936; line carried on by Allis-Chalmers after purchase)
- Advance-Rumely Number 4 Combine (1928–1929)

=== Grain processing equipment ===
- Advance-Rumely Corn Sheller (1924–1925)
- Rumely Corn Shredder (1901–1928)
- Rumely Thresher (1904–1936; line carried on by Allis-Chalmers after purchase)

=== Other products ===
Advance-Rumely also offered stationary engines, silo fillers, water wagons, cream separators, plows, and a line of lubricating oils designed for the company's tractor lines.

=== Cargo truck ===
There is evidence that the company produced a cargo truck, but data is scarce.
