= Cabin Lake (California) =

Lake in the state of California, United States

- Location within California Location within the United States
- Location: Madera County, California
- Coordinates: 37°41′04″N 119°09′08″W
- Type: Lake
- Basin countries: United States
- Surface elevation: 9,567 feet (2,916 m)

Cabin Lake is a lake in Madera County, California, in the United States.

Cabin Lake was named for a cabin which stood nearby.

== See also ==
- List of lakes in California
