= Big Stone, Alberta =

Unincorporated community in Canada

Coordinates: 51°13′08″N 111°11′35″W

Location of Big Stone Alberta

Big Stone is an unincorporated community in southern Alberta in Special Area No. 3, located 28 km (17 mi) south of Highway 9, 142 km (88 mi) northwest of Medicine Hat.

The community takes its name from nearby Bigstone Creek.

== Climate ==
Big Stone experiences a semi-arid climate (Köppen climate classification BSk) with long, cold, dry winters and short, warm summers. Precipitation is low, with an annual average of 337.4 mm (13.28 in), and is concentrated in the warmer months.

Climate data for Big Stone
| Month | Jan | Feb | Mar | Apr | May | Jun | Jul | Aug | Sep | Oct | Nov | Dec | Year |
|---|---|---|---|---|---|---|---|---|---|---|---|---|---|
| Record high °C (°F) | 12.0 (53.6) | 14.5 (58.1) | 21.5 (70.7) | 29.5 (85.1) | 35.0 (95.0) | 37.0 (98.6) | 36.5 (97.7) | 38.0 (100.4) | 35.0 (95.0) | 28.0 (82.4) | 21.5 (70.7) | 14.5 (58.1) | 38.0 (100.4) |
| Mean daily maximum °C (°F) | −7.6 (18.3) | −4.4 (24.1) | 2.9 (37.2) | 13.0 (55.4) | 18.6 (65.5) | 22.6 (72.7) | 25.3 (77.5) | 25.2 (77.4) | 19.0 (66.2) | 11.8 (53.2) | 0.0 (32.0) | −5.8 (21.6) | 10.1 (50.2) |
| Daily mean °C (°F) | −12.7 (9.1) | −9.5 (14.9) | −2.5 (27.5) | 6.1 (43.0) | 11.6 (52.9) | 15.8 (60.4) | 18.2 (64.8) | 17.9 (64.2) | 12.0 (53.6) | 5.1 (41.2) | −5.0 (23.0) | −10.9 (12.4) | 3.8 (38.8) |
| Mean daily minimum °C (°F) | −17.8 (0.0) | −14.5 (5.9) | −7.8 (18.0) | −0.9 (30.4) | 4.6 (40.3) | 9.0 (48.2) | 10.9 (51.6) | 10.6 (51.1) | 4.8 (40.6) | −1.7 (28.9) | −10.0 (14.0) | −16.0 (3.2) | −2.4 (27.7) |
| Record low °C (°F) | −41.5 (−42.7) | −40.0 (−40.0) | −30.5 (−22.9) | −14.0 (6.8) | −6.0 (21.2) | −1.5 (29.3) | 2.5 (36.5) | −1.0 (30.2) | −8.0 (17.6) | −28.5 (−19.3) | −37.5 (−35.5) | −43.0 (−45.4) | −43.0 (−45.4) |
| Average precipitation mm (inches) | 14.2 (0.56) | 8.6 (0.34) | 13.5 (0.53) | 19.0 (0.75) | 44.6 (1.76) | 73.0 (2.87) | 54.9 (2.16) | 35.1 (1.38) | 32.7 (1.29) | 12.3 (0.48) | 14.8 (0.58) | 14.8 (0.58) | 337.4 (13.28) |
| Average rainfall mm (inches) | 0.0 (0.0) | 0.2 (0.01) | 1.4 (0.06) | 12.4 (0.49) | 43.4 (1.71) | 73.0 (2.87) | 54.9 (2.16) | 35.1 (1.38) | 31.8 (1.25) | 7.4 (0.29) | 1.3 (0.05) | 0.9 (0.04) | 261.7 (10.30) |
| Average snowfall cm (inches) | 14.1 (5.6) | 8.4 (3.3) | 12.1 (4.8) | 6.6 (2.6) | 1.3 (0.5) | 0.0 (0.0) | 0.0 (0.0) | 0.0 (0.0) | 0.9 (0.4) | 5.0 (2.0) | 13.5 (5.3) | 13.8 (5.4) | 75.7 (29.8) |
| Average precipitation days (≥ 0.2 mm) | 5.7 | 4.3 | 5.5 | 5.3 | 8.9 | 11.9 | 10.3 | 8.6 | 7.5 | 5.1 | 5.8 | 6.6 | 85.3 |
| Average rainy days (≥ 0.2 mm) | 0.1 | 0.3 | 0.8 | 3.9 | 8.8 | 11.9 | 10.3 | 8.6 | 7.2 | 3.8 | 1.2 | 0.3 | 57.2 |
| Average snowy days (≥ 0.2 cm) | 5.5 | 4.0 | 4.9 | 1.9 | 0.4 | 0.0 | 0.0 | 0.0 | 0.4 | 1.7 | 4.9 | 6.4 | 30.1 |
Source: Environment Canada

== See also ==
- List of communities in Alberta
