= United Farm Women of Alberta =

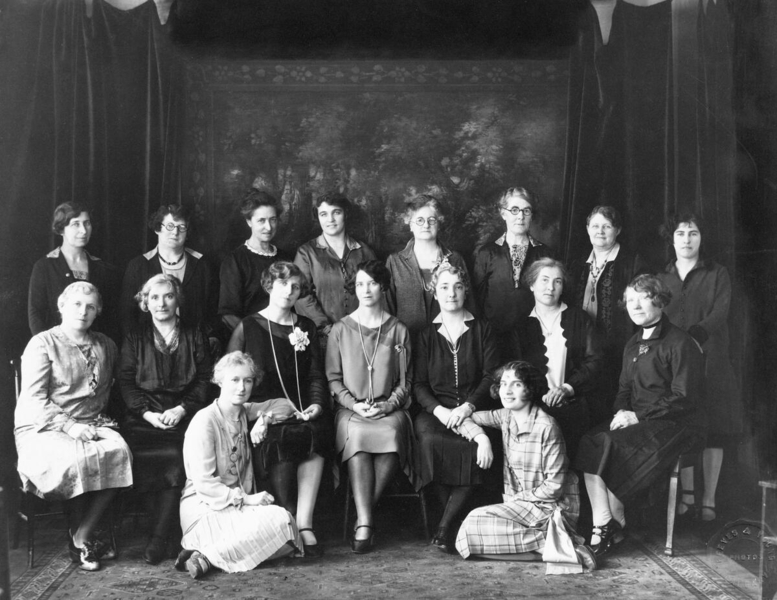
- Board of directors of the UFWA in 1928
- Founded: 1915; 111 years ago
- Dissolved: 2000; 26 years ago
- Location: Canada

The United Farm Women of Alberta, later the Farm Women's Union of Alberta and Women of Unifarm, was a Canadian organization between 1915 and 2000. Originally founded as an auxiliary group of the United Farmers of Alberta in 1915, its members voted to make it a separate organization the following year. The group was a more rural alternative to some women than other groups of the time, such as the Woman's Christian Temperance Union and the National Council of Women. The UFWA mainly focused on improving healthcare and education for rural communities.

In 1916, the organization elected Irene Parlby as its first president. Parlby would later serve as a member of the Legislative Assembly of Alberta from 1921 to 1935, and was the second woman in the British Empire to hold a position in a Cabinet. Between 1918 and 1920, membership in the UFWA grew from 1,450 to over 4,000 women.

The organization published a series of eight cookbooks between 1928 and 1989. In total, the cookbooks sold over 125,000 copies.

The UFWA changed its name to the Farm Women's Union of Alberta in 1949, and again to Women of Unifarm in 1970.

The organization voted to disband on 14 June 2000, due to lack of funding and dwindling numbers of active members.

== Bibliography ==
- Jaques, Carrol (2001), Unifarm: A Story of Conflict & Change, University of Calgary Press, ISBN 9781552380512
- MacEwan, Grant (1975), And mighty women too: stories of notable western Canadian women, Western Producer Prairie Books, ISBN 9780919306653
- McKinlay, Clare Mary (1953), The Honorable Irene Parlby, University of Alberta Libraries
- Prentice, Alison (1988), Canadian women : a history, Harcourt Brace, ISBN 9780774731126
