= Oyen =

- Town
- Town of Oyen
- Location in Special Area No. 3

- Location of Oyen in Alberta
- Coordinates: 51°21′08″N 110°28′26″W
- Country: Canada
- Province: Alberta
- Region: Southern Alberta
- Census division: 4
- Special Area: Special Area No. 3
- Incorporated
  - Village: January 17, 1913
  - Town: September 1, 1965

Government
  - Governing body: Oyen Town Council

Area (2021)
  - Land: 5.15 km^{2} (1.99 sq mi)
- Elevation: 770 m (2,530 ft)

Population (2021)
  - Total: 917
  - Density: 178.1/km^{2} (461/sq mi)
- Time zone: UTC−06:00 (Alberta Time)
- Postal code span: T0J 2J0
- Highways: Highway 9 Highway 41; Highway 895
- Website: Official website

Oyen is a town in Southern Alberta, Canada near the Saskatchewan boundary and north of Medicine Hat. It is on Highway 41, 4 km (2.5 mi) south of its junction with Highway 9.

Early name, Bishopburg, was changed in 1912 to honour Andrew Oyen, an early settler who sold his homestead for the townsite.

Oyen is the service centre for a large but sparsely populated dryland farming area. In the surrounding area wheat, barley, and canola are important crops, and beef cattle are raised.

== Geography ==
=== Climate ===
Oyen experiences a semi-arid climate (Köppen climate classification BSk). Winters are long, cold and dry, while summers are short and warm. Precipitation is low, with an annual average of 322 mm, and is heavily concentrated in the warmer months. Oyen's precipitation is narrowly below being a humid continental climate, a type it closely resembles in terms of yearly temperatures.

Climate data for Oyen Cappon Climate ID: 3024961; coordinates 51°10′N 110°31′W; elevation: 792.5 m (2,600 ft); 1981−2010 normals
Month	Jan	Feb	Mar	Apr	May	Jun	Jul	Aug	Sep	Oct	Nov	Dec	Year
Record high °C (°F)	11.0 (51.8)	14.5 (58.1)	25.5 (77.9)	30.5 (86.9)	35.5 (95.9)	37.5 (99.5)	38.0 (100.4)	39.0 (102.2)	36.0 (96.8)	28.0 (82.4)	21.0 (69.8)	13.5 (56.3)	39.0 (102.2)
Mean daily maximum °C (°F)	−6.7 (19.9)	−4.0 (24.8)	2.2 (36.0)	12.2 (54.0)	18.2 (64.8)	22.1 (71.8)	26.1 (79.0)	25.6 (78.1)	18.8 (65.8)	10.1 (50.2)	0.7 (33.3)	−5.0 (23.0)	10.1 (50.2)
Daily mean °C (°F)	−11.4 (11.5)	−8.7 (16.3)	−2.9 (26.8)	5.5 (41.9)	11.3 (52.3)	15.5 (59.9)	18.8 (65.8)	18.0 (64.4)	12.0 (53.6)	5.1 (41.2)	−3.9 (25.0)	−9.6 (14.7)	4.1 (39.4)
Mean daily minimum °C (°F)	−16.1 (3.0)	−13.4 (7.9)	−8.0 (17.6)	−1.3 (29.7)	4.3 (39.7)	8.9 (48.0)	11.4 (52.5)	10.4 (50.7)	5.2 (41.4)	−1.0 (30.2)	−8.5 (16.7)	−14.3 (6.3)	−1.9 (28.6)
Record low °C (°F)	−40.0 (−40.0)	−40.5 (−40.9)	−33.5 (−28.3)	−23.3 (−9.9)	−7.5 (18.5)	−6.5 (20.3)	3.5 (38.3)	0.0 (32.0)	−8.5 (16.7)	−24.5 (−12.1)	−35.0 (−31.0)	−42.0 (−43.6)	−42.0 (−43.6)
Average precipitation mm (inches)	9.8 (0.39)	5.8 (0.23)	11.2 (0.44)	16.9 (0.67)	41.2 (1.62)	74.7 (2.94)	51.3 (2.02)	34.9 (1.37)	32.0 (1.26)	13.4 (0.53)	11.1 (0.44)	9.8 (0.39)	312.1 (12.29)
Average rainfall mm (inches)	0.0 (0.0)	0.2 (0.01)	1.1 (0.04)	12.3 (0.48)	40.0 (1.57)	74.7 (2.94)	51.3 (2.02)	34.9 (1.37)	31.0 (1.22)	7.7 (0.30)	0.5 (0.02)	0.4 (0.02)	254.1 (10.00)
Average snowfall cm (inches)	9.8 (3.9)	5.6 (2.2)	10.1 (4.0)	4.6 (1.8)	1.2 (0.5)	0.0 (0.0)	0.0 (0.0)	0.0 (0.0)	1.0 (0.4)	5.7 (2.2)	10.6 (4.2)	9.4 (3.7)	58 (23)
Average precipitation days (≥ 0.2 mm)	3.8	2.3	3.6	4.4	8.5	11.2	9.2	7.6	7.3	4.3	3.5	3.5	69.1
Average rainy days (≥ 0.2 mm)	0.0	0.07	0.52	3.2	8.2	11.2	9.2	7.6	7.0	2.9	0.19	0.12	50.2
Average snowy days (≥ 0.2 cm)	3.8	2.2	3.2	1.4	0.48	0.0	0.0	0.0	0.3	1.8	3.4	3.5	20.0
Source: Environment and Climate Change Canada,

== Demographics ==
In the 2021 Census of Population conducted by Statistics Canada, the Town of Oyen had a population of 917 living in 352 of its 404 total private dwellings, a change of −8.4% from its 2016 population of 1,001. With a land area of 5.15 km^{2} (1.99 sq mi), it had a population density of 178.1/km^{2} (461.2/sq mi) in 2021.

The population of the Town of Oyen according to its 2017 municipal census is 1,022, a change of 1.6% from its 2015 municipal census population of 1,006.

In the 2016 Census of Population conducted by Statistics Canada, the Town of Oyen recorded a population of 1,001 living in 400 of its 422 total private dwellings, a 2.9% change from its 2011 population of 973. With a land area of 5.28 km^{2} (2.04 sq mi), it had a population density of 189.6/km^{2} (491.0/sq mi) in 2016.

== Attractions ==
Oyen has a golf course and a local museum. Oyen also contains an arena, curling rink, and outdoor pool. Oyen is also home to the Badlands Badgers baseball academy for high school students.

== Infrastructure ==
A major highway rest stop is located north of the town at the junction of Highway 41 and Highway 9. It is developed with a service station, A&W restaurant, a motel and a visitor information centre operated by Travel Alberta. There is Oyen Municipal Airport nearby. Oyen also has a hospital. Big Country Hospital has a 35% occupancy rate for in-patients.

== Education ==
Oyen is home to a regional public high school and a small Catholic elementary school. The high school is known as South Central High School (SCHS) with students grade seven to twelve. Oyen Public School (OPS) hosts students from kindergarten to grade nine. Assumption Roman Catholic school has students from kindergarten to grade six.

== Notable people ==
- Rick Strankman, Member of the Legislative Assembly of Alberta for Drumheller-Stettler, April 23, 2012 – April 16, 2019.
- Melody Davidson, head coach of the gold medal-winning 2006 Winter Olympics and 2010 Winter Olympics Canadian women's hockey team, and director of the team that won gold in 2014.

== See also ==
- List of communities in Alberta
- List of towns in Alberta
