= Rumely Oil Pull =

Line of farm tractors

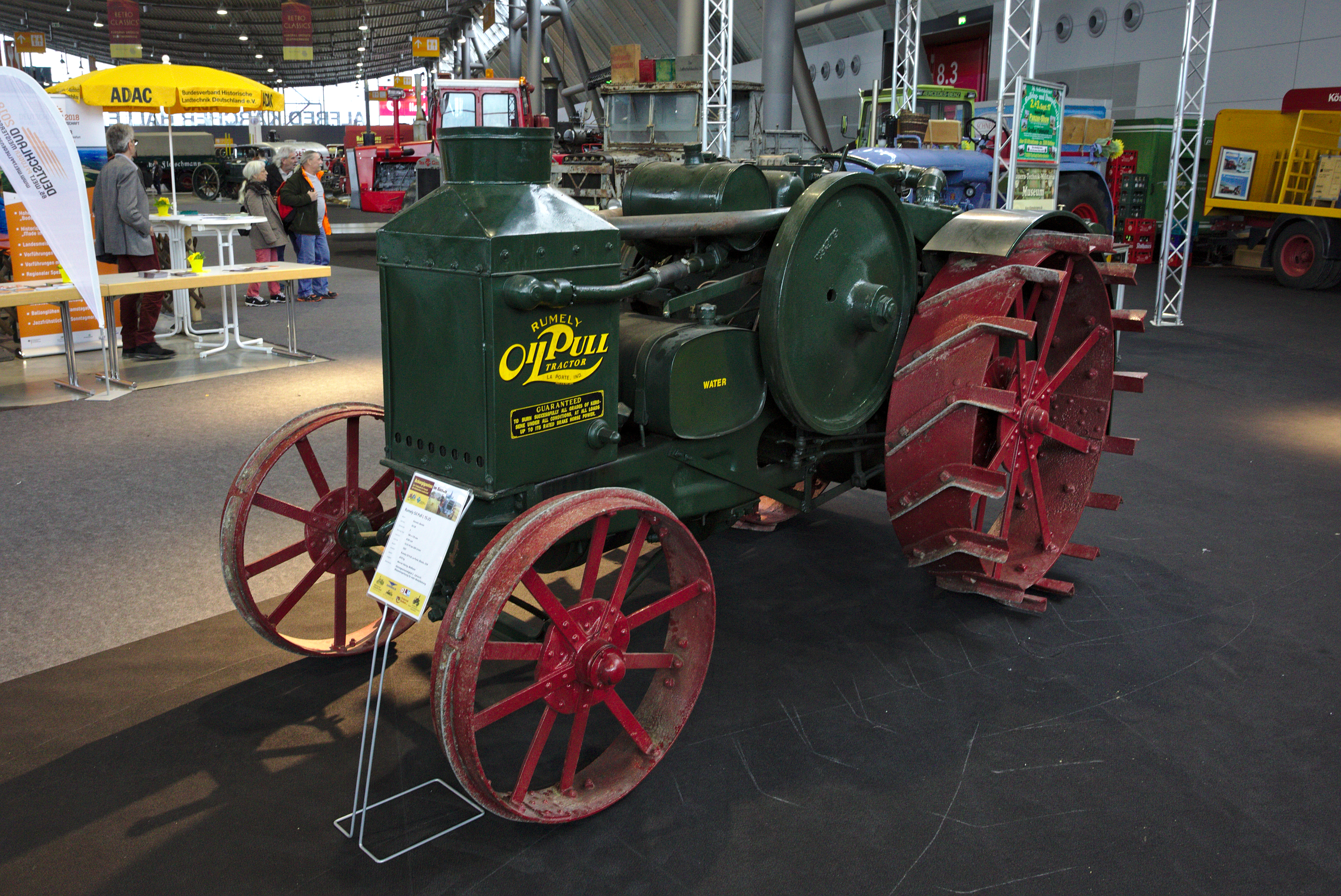
Rumely Oil Pull tractor "L"

The Rumely Oil Pull was a line of farm tractors developed by Advance-Rumely Company from 1909 and sold 1910 to 1930. Most were heavy tractors powered by an internal combustion, magneto-fired engine designed to burn all kerosene grades at any load, called the Oil Turn.

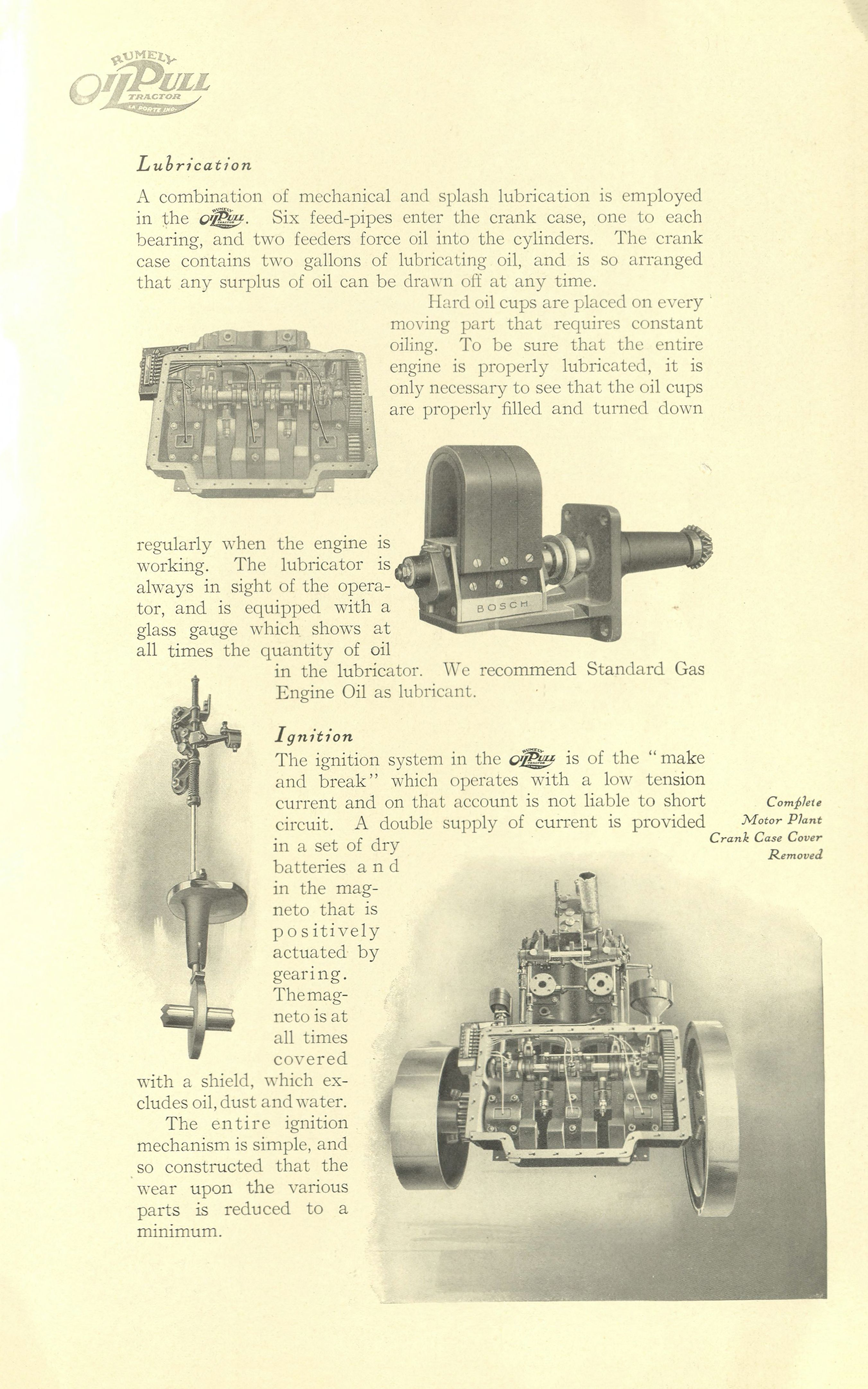
Rumely Oil Pull, ignition & lubrication

A running Rumely Oil Pull tractor

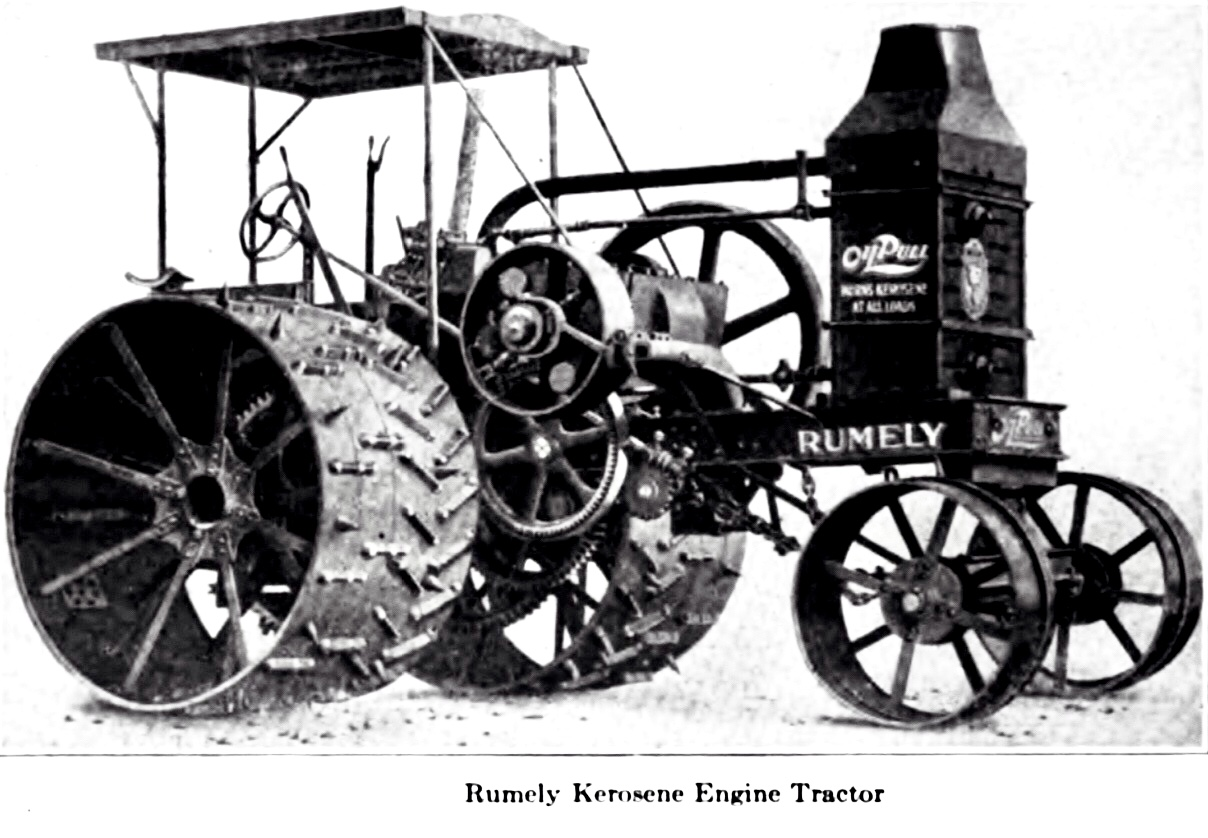
Rumely Tractor (1915).

A popular model, the Type F, had a single cylinder of 10" bore and a 12" stroke. It was started by the operator stepping out of the cab via the large iron rear wheel, climbing onto the flywheel and using his bodyweight to get it turning, then quickly rushing back into the cab to adjust the choke and try to keep the engine running.

== Models ==
=== Heavy Weights ===
Kerosene Annie

- Rumely Model "B" Prototype. Only one remains. It is currently on display in Boise, Idaho.

Model "B" 25-45

- 1910 Serial# 1 - 100
- 1911 Serial# 2,101 - 2,269
- 1912 Serial# 2,270 - 2,936

Model "E" 30-60

- 1910 Serial# 101 - 236
- 1911 Serial# 237 - 746
- 1912 Serial# 747 - 1,678
- 1913 Serial# 1,679 - 1,787
- 1914 Serial# None Built
- 1915 Serial# 1,819 - 2,018
- 1916 Serial# 2,019 - 2,100
- 1917 Serial# 2,997 - 8,724
- 1918 Serial# 8,725 - 8,902
- 1919 Serial# 11,500 - 11,596
- 1920 Serial# 2,252 - 2,351
- 1921 Serial# 2,352 - 2,402
- 1922 Serial# 2,404 - 2,453
- 1923 Serial# 2,454 - 2,503

Model "S" 30-60

- 1924 Serial# 1-4
- 1925 Serial# 5-34
- 1926 Serial# 35-234
- 1927 Serial# 235-434
- 1928 Serial# 435-514

Model "Y" 30-50

- 1929 Serial# 1-45

Model "Z" 40-70

- 1929 Serial# 1-215

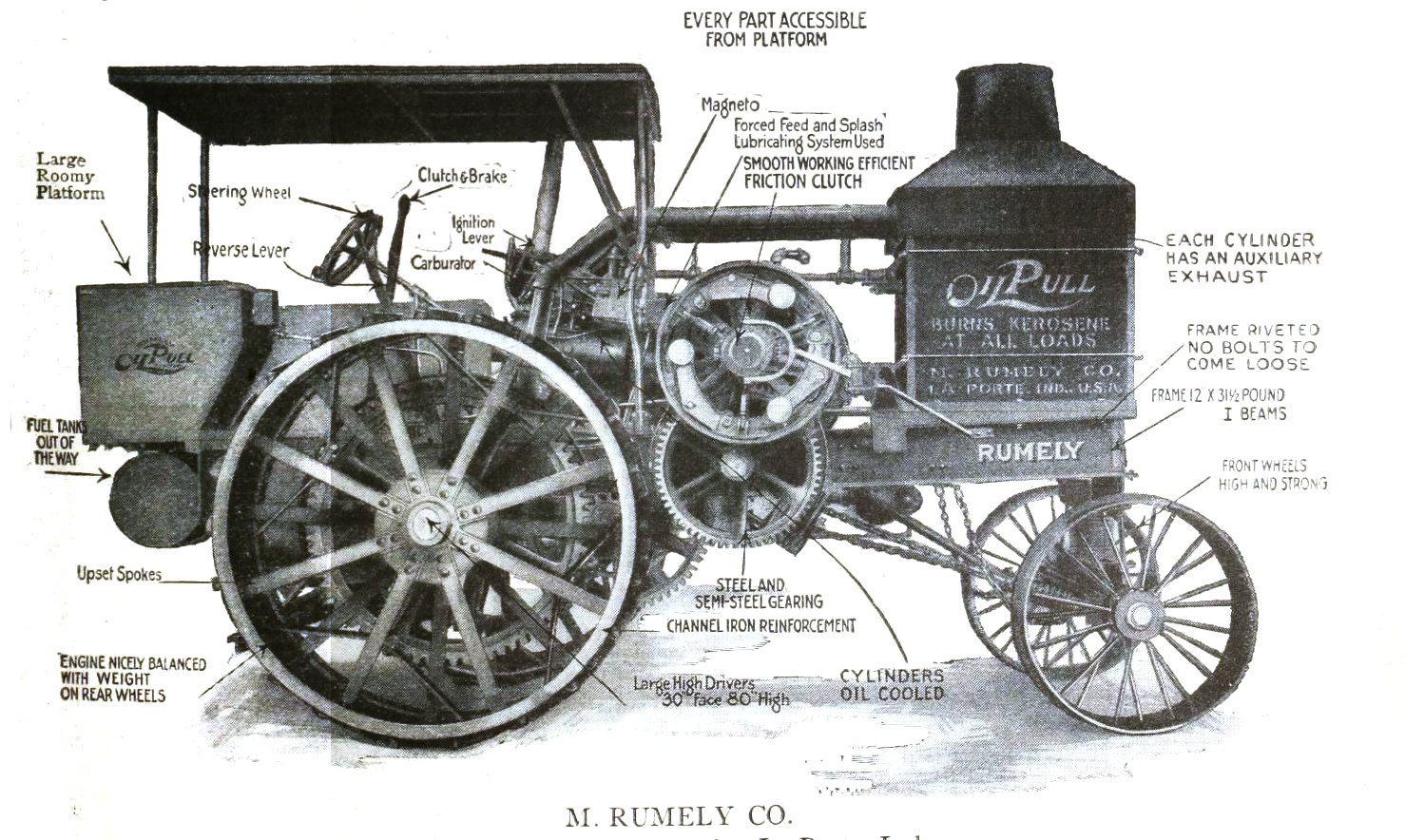
Illustration from a 1911 advertisement
