= Special Area No. 3 =

Special area in Alberta, Canada

- Special area

- Location within Alberta
- Country: Canada
- Province: Alberta
- Planning region: Red Deer
- Incorporated: April 7, 1959

Government
  - Governing body: Special Areas Board
  - Municipal office: Hanna
  - District office: Oyen

Area (2021)
  - Land: 6,469.33 km^{2} (2,497.82 sq mi)

Population (2021)
  - Total: 1,142
  - Density: 0.2/km^{2} (0.52/sq mi)
- Time zone: UTC−06:00 (Alberta Time)
- Postal Code Prefix: T0J
- Area code: +1-403
- Website: Special Areas Board

Special Area No. 3 is a special area in southern Alberta, Canada. It is a rural municipality similar to a municipal district; however, the elected council is overseen by four representatives appointed by the province, the Special Areas Board.

The Blood Indian Creek Reservoir is located within Special Area 3.

== Geography ==
=== Communities and localities ===
The following urban municipalities are surrounded by Special Area No. 3.

Cities

- none

Towns

- Oyen

Villages

- Youngstown

Summer villages

- none

The following hamlets are located within Special Area No. 3.

Hamlets

- Benton
- Cereal
- Chinook
- Esther
- Excel
- Lanfine
- New Brigden
- Sedalia
- Sibbald

The following localities are located within Special Area No. 3.

Localities

- Anatole
- Big Stone
- Cabin Lake
- Calthorpe
- Cappon
- Dobson
- Gold Spur
- Helmsdale
- Naco
- Sunnydale
- Wastina

== Demographics ==
In the 2021 Census of Population conducted by Statistics Canada, Special Area No. 3 had a population of 1,142 living in 439 of its 527 total private dwellings, a change of −1% from its 2016 population of 1,153. With a land area of 6,469.33 km^{2} (2,497.82 sq mi), it had a population density of 0.2/km^{2} (0.5/sq mi) in 2021.

In the 2016 Census of Population conducted by Statistics Canada, Special Area No. 3 had a population of 1,042 living in 387 of its 457 total private dwellings, a change of −7.1% from its 2011 population of 1,122. With a land area of 6,625.58 km^{2} (2,558.15 sq mi), it had a population density of 0.2/km^{2} (0.4/sq mi) in 2016.

== See also ==
- List of communities in Alberta
- List of improvement districts in Alberta
- List of municipal districts in Alberta
- List of municipalities in Alberta
