= New Democratic Party candidates in the 2021 Canadian federal election =

This is a list of New Democratic Party in the 2021 Canadian federal election. The NDP nominated candidates in all of Canada's 338 ridings; 25 of whom were elected. Following the election, the NDP remained the fourth-largest party in the House of Commons.

== Alberta ==
=== Calgary ===
Riding	Candidate's Name	Notes	Residence	Occupation	Votes	%	Rank
Calgary Centre	Juan Estevez Moreno		Beltline, Calgary	Sales professional	9,694	16.37	3rd
Calgary Confederation	Gulshan Akter	ANDP candidate for Calgary-West in the 2019 Alberta provincial election	Taradale, Calgary	Businesswoman	10,561	17.14	3rd
Calgary Forest Lawn	Keira Gunn		Calgary	University lecturer	6,254	18.05	3rd
Calgary Heritage	Kathleen M. Johnson		Calgary	Retail manager	9,320	17.41	2nd
Calgary Midnapore	Gurmit Bhachu	NDP candidate for Calgary Midnapore in the 2019 federal election	Calgary	Teacher	11,826	18.33	2nd
Calgary Nose Hill	Khalis Ahmed	NDP candidate for Calgary Signal Hill in the 2019 and 2015 federal elections NDP candidate in the 2017 Calgary Heritage federal by-election	Calgary	Geologist	8,500	16.87	3rd
Calgary Rocky Ridge	Jena Dianne Kieren		Calgary	University student	10,748	16.26	3rd
Calgary Shepard	Raj Jessel		Chestermere	Bus driver	12,103	16.45	2nd
Calgary Signal Hill	Patrick King	NDP candidate for Calgary Nose Hill in the 2019 federal election	Calgary	App developer	8,863	14.84	3rd
Calgary Skyview	Gurinder Singh Gill		Saddle Ridge, Calgary	Accountant	7,690	16.21	3rd

=== Edmonton ===
Riding	Candidate's Name	Notes	Residence	Occupation	Votes	%	Rank
Edmonton Centre	Heather MacKenzie		Blatchford, Edmonton	Director	14,171	28.83	3rd
Edmonton Griesbach	Blake Desjarlais		Griesbach, Edmonton	Director at Métis Settlements General Council	17,457	40.54	1st
Edmonton Manning	Charmaine St. Germain	NDP candidate for Edmonton Manning in the 2019 federal election	High Park, Edmonton	Clerk	14,999	30.47	2nd
Edmonton Mill Woods	Nigel Logan	NDP candidate for Edmonton Mill Woods in the 2019 federal election	Kiniski Gardens, Edmonton	IT professional	10,553	21.75	3rd
Edmonton Riverbend	Shawn Gray		Queen Alexandra, Edmonton	Civil servant	14,154	24.86	3rd
Edmonton Strathcona	Heather McPherson	Member of Parliament for Edmonton Strathcona (2019–present)	Argyll, Edmonton		31,690	60.68	1st
Edmonton West	Sandra Hunter		Britannia Youngstown, Edmonton	Advisor	14,190	25.34	2nd
Edmonton—Wetaskiwin	Hugo Charles		Leduc		18,259	21.03	2nd
Sherwood Park—Fort Saskatchewan	Aidan Bradley Theroux	NDP candidate for Sherwood Park—Fort Saskatchewan in the 2019 federal election	Fort Saskatchewan	Student	14,740	20.64	2nd
St. Albert—Edmonton	Kathleen Mpulubusi	NDP candidate for St. Albert—Edmonton in the 2019 federal election	Carlisle, Edmonton	Postal worker	17,816	28.58	2nd

=== Rural Alberta ===
Riding	Candidate's Name	Notes	Residence	Occupation	Votes	%	Rank
Banff—Airdrie	Sarah Zagoda		Airdrie	IT professional	12,482	16.21	2nd
Battle River—Crowfoot	Tonya Ratushniak		New Norway	Nurse	5,761	9.82	2nd
Bow River	Michael MacLean		Edmonton		4,726	9.24	3rd
Foothills	Michelle Traxel		Okotoks	Restaurant owner	7,117	11.08	2nd
Fort McMurray—Cold Lake	Garnett Robinson		Lac La Biche		4,377	10.14	3rd
Grande Prairie-Mackenzie	Jennifer Villebrun	NDP candidate for Peace River—Westlock in the 2019 federal election NDP candidate for Peace River in the 2011 federal election Green Party candidate for Peace River in the 2008 federal election	Valleyview	Teacher/lawyer	6,462	12.16	2nd
Lakeland	Des Bissonnette		Lloydminster	Healthcare worker	5,519	10.48	3rd
Lethbridge	Elaine Perez		Lethbridge	Student	11,386	19.31	2nd
Medicine Hat—Cardston—Warner	Jocelyn Stenger		Edmonton		6,816	14.08	2nd
Peace River—Westlock	Gail Ungstad		Slave Lake	Social worker	6,019	12.86	2nd
Red Deer—Lacombe	Tanya Heyden-Kaye		Ponoka		8,806	14.21	2nd
Red Deer—Mountain View	Marie Grabowski		Springbrook	Laboratory technician	8,826	13.94	2nd
Sturgeon River—Parkland	Kendra Mills		Stony Plain	Educator	12,532	18.85	2nd
Yellowhead	Guillaume Roy		Jasper		5,977	11.77	3rd

== British Columbia ==
=== British Columbia Interior ===
Riding	Candidate's Name	Notes	Residence	Occupation	Votes	%	Rank
Cariboo—Prince George	Audrey McKinnon		Prince George	Communications professional/Reporter	10,323	20.36	2nd
Central Okanagan—Similkameen—Nicola	Joan Phillip	NDP candidate for Central Okanagan—Similkameen—Nicola in the 2019 federal election	Penticton	Land manager for the Penticton Indian Band	13,813	21.51	2nd
Kamloops—Thompson—Cariboo	Bill Sundhu		Kamloops	Lawyer	20,431	29.00	2nd
Kelowna—Lake Country	Cade Desjarlais		Kelowna	Student	12,204	18.18	3rd
Kootenay—Columbia	Wayne Stetski	Member of Parliament for Kootenay—Columbia (2015–2021); Mayor of Cranbrook (2011–2014)	Cranbrook	Park manager	23,986	36.92	2nd
North Okanagan—Shuswap	Ron Johnston		Vernon		13,929	19.24	2nd
Prince George—Peace River—Northern Rockies	Cory Grizz Longley	BC NDP candidate for Peace River South in the 2020 British Columbia provincial election	Dawson Creek	Plumber	6,647	13.51	2nd
Skeena—Bulkley Valley	Taylor Bachrach	Member of Parliament for Skeena—Bulkley Valley (2019–2025); Mayor of Smithers (2011–2019)	Smithers	Small business owner	15,921	42.58	1st
South Okanagan—West Kootenay	Richard Cannings	Member of Parliament for South Okanagan—West Kootenay (2015–2025)	Penticton	Biologist	27,595	41.32	1st

=== Fraser Valley/Lower Mainland ===
Riding	Candidate's Name	Notes	Residence	Occupation	Votes	%	Rank
Abbotsford	Dharmasena Yakandawela		Coquitlam	Lawyer	7,729	17.16	3rd
Burnaby North—Seymour	Jim Hanson		North Vancouver	Lawyer	14,318	29.11	2nd
Burnaby South	Jagmeet Singh	Leader of the New Democratic Party (2017–2025); Member of Parliament for Burnaby South (2019–2025); Member of the Legislative Assembly of Ontario for Bramalea—Gore—Malton (2011–2017)	Burnaby	Lawyer	16,382	40.34	1st
Chilliwack—Hope	DJ Pohl		Chilliwack	Legal assistant	13,927	26.70	2nd
Cloverdale—Langley City	Rajesh Jayaprakash		Surrey	Small business owner	10,587	19.88	3rd
Coquitlam—Port Coquitlam	Laura Dupont	Member of Port Coquitlam City Council (2014–2022)	Port Coquitlam		14,982	26.89	3rd
Delta	Monika Dean		Delta	Technician	9,591	18.34	3rd
Fleetwood—Port Kells	Raji Toor		Surrey	Teacher	8,960	18.99	3rd
Langley—Aldergrove	Michael Chang		Langley	Consultant	12,288	19.62	3rd
Mission—Matsqui—Fraser Canyon	Lynn Perrin		Abbotsford	Researcher	8,709	20.17	3rd
New Westminster—Burnaby	Peter Julian	Member of Parliament for New Westminster—Burnaby (2015–2025); Member of Parliament for Burnaby—New Westminster (2004–2015)	New Westminster		24,054	48.77	1st
North Vancouver	Tammy Bentz		Upper Lonsdale, North Vancouver	Filmmaker/actor	11,750	19.81	3rd
Pitt Meadows—Maple Ridge	Phil Klapwyk		Maple Ridge	Union official	16,869	31.93	2nd
Port Moody—Coquitlam	Bonita Zarrillo	Member of Coquitlam City Council (2013–2021)	Coquitlam		19,367	37.18	1st
Richmond Centre	Sandra Nixon		Richmond	Minister	6,196	18.14	3rd
South Surrey—White Rock	June Liu		Surrey	Fundraiser	8,395	14.75	3rd
Steveston—Richmond East	Jack Trovato		Richmond	Teacher	7,525	19.32	3rd
Surrey Centre	Sonia Andhi		Surrey	Social worker	10,627	27.68	2nd
Surrey—Newton	Avneet Johal		Surrey	Advisor	9,536	26.05	2nd
Vancouver Centre	Breen Ouellette	NDP candidate for Vancouver Centre in the 2019 federal election	Vancouver	Lawyer	15,869	30.74	2nd
Vancouver East	Jenny Kwan	Member of Parliament for Vancouver East (2015–present); Member of the British Columbia Legislative Assembly for Vancouver-Mount Pleasant (1996–2015)	Vancouver		27,969	56.40	1st
Vancouver Granville	Anjali Appadurai		Vancouver	Environmental activist	16,619	33.53	2nd
Vancouver Kingsway	Don Davies	Member of Parliament for Vancouver Kingsway (2008–present)	Kensington–Cedar Cottage, Vancouver	Lawyer	20,994	52.28	1st
Vancouver Quadra	Naden Abenes		Vancouver		9,220	19.33	3rd
Vancouver South	Sean McQuillan	NDP candidate for Vancouver South in the 2019 federal election	Coquitlam		9,922	24.63	3rd
West Vancouver—Sunshine Coast—Sea to Sky Country	Avi Lewis		Halfmoon Bay	Documentary filmmaker / Broadcaster	16,265	25.63	3rd

=== Vancouver Island ===
Riding	Candidate's Name	Notes	Residence	Occupation	Votes	%	Rank
Courtenay—Alberni	Gord Johns	Member of Parliament for Courtenay—Alberni (2015–present); Member of Tofino Town Council (2008–2011)	Port Alberni	Small business owner	30,612	44.21	1st
Cowichan—Malahat—Langford	Alistair MacGregor	Member of Parliament for Cowichan—Malahat—Langford (2015–2025)	Duncan	Executive assistant	26,968	42.78	1st
Esquimalt—Saanich—Sooke	Randall Garrison	Member of Parliament for Esquimalt—Saanich—Sooke (2015–2025); Member of Parliament for Esquimalt—Juan de Fuca (2011–2015)	Esquimalt	Professor at Camosun College	28,056	42.81	1st
Nanaimo—Ladysmith	Lisa Marie Barron	Nanaimo Ladysmith Public Schools District Trustee (2018–2021)	Nanaimo	Social worker	19,826	28.83	1st
North Island—Powell River	Rachel Blaney	Member of Parliament for North Island—Powell River (2015–2025)	Campbell River	Non-profit executive	23,833	39.55	1st
Saanich—Gulf Islands	Sabina Singh	NDP candidate for Saanich—Gulf Islands in the 2019 federal election	Saanich	University professor	11,959	18.25	4th
Victoria	Laurel Collins	Member of Parliament for Victoria (2019–2025); Member of Victoria City Council (2018–2019)	Victoria	Professor at the University of Victoria	29,301	43.90	1st

== Manitoba ==
=== Rural Manitoba ===
Riding	Candidate's Name	Notes	Residence	Occupation	Votes	%	Rank
Brandon—Souris	Whitney Hodgins		Brandon	Security professional	7,838	20.54	2nd
Churchill—Keewatinook Aski	Niki Ashton	Member of Parliament for Churchill—Keewatinook Aski (2008–2025)	Thompson		7,632	42.57	1st
Dauphin—Swan River—Neepawa	Arthur Holroyd		Winnipeg	Educator	5,678	14.74	2nd
Portage—Lisgar	Ken Friesen		Morden	Sales professional	6,068	13.38	3rd
Provencher	Serina Pottinger		Winnipeg	Assistant	6,270	12.56	4th
Selkirk—Interlake—Eastman	Margaret Smith		St. Andrews	Teacher	9,604	19.36	2nd

=== Winnipeg ===
Riding	Candidate's Name	Notes	Residence	Occupation	Votes	%	Rank
Charleswood—St. James—Assiniboia—Headingley	Madelaine Dwyer	President of CUPE Local 500	Winnipeg	Labourer	6,974	15.40	3rd
Elmwood–Transcona	Daniel Blaikie	Member of Parliament for Elmwood–Transcona (2015–2024)	Winnipeg	Electrician	20,791	49.69	1st
Kildonan—St. Paul	Emily Clark		Winnipeg		10,313	23.47	3rd
Saint Boniface—Saint Vital	Meghan Waters		Winnipeg	Teacher	9,767	21.48	3rd
Winnipeg Centre	Leah Gazan	Member of Parliament for Winnipeg Centre (2019–present)	Wolseley, Winnipeg	Lecturer at the University of Winnipeg	14,962	50.29	1st
Winnipeg North	Melissa Chung-Mowat		North Point Douglas, Winnipeg	Consultant	8,998	28.65	2nd
Winnipeg South	Aiden Kahanovitch		Winnipeg	Human resources professional	6,632	14.04	3rd
Winnipeg South Centre	Julia Riddell		Winnipeg	Psychologist	10,064	20.64	3rd

== New Brunswick ==
Riding	Candidate's Name	Notes	Residence	Occupation	Votes	%	Rank
Acadie—Bathurst	Mélissa Hébert		Beresford	Engineer	4,906	11.43	3rd
Beauséjour	Evelyne Godfrey	NB NDP candidate for Fredericton-York in the 2018 New Brunswick provincial election	Port Elgin	Archeologist / Professor at Mount Allison University	5,394	10.98	3rd
Fredericton	Shawn Oldenburg	NB NDP candidate for Carleton in the 2020 New Brunswick provincial election	Canterbury	Postal worker	5,564	12.63	4th
Fundy Royal	Josh Floyd	NB NDP candidate for Saint John East in the 2020 New Brunswick provincial election	Loch Lonmond		6,211	13.99	3rd
Madawaska—Restigouche	Elizabeth MacDonald		Fredericton		1,848	6.05	4th
Miramichi—Grand Lake	Bruce Potter		Ottawa	Social worker	2,291	7.05	3rd
Moncton—Riverview—Dieppe	Serge Landry		Moncton	Union official (CLC)	7,774	16.99	3rd
New Brunswick Southwest	Richard Trevor Warren		Hanwell	Computer programmer	4,893	13.36	3rd
Saint John—Rothesay	Don Paulin		Saint John	Healthcare worker	4,816	12.86	3rd
Tobique—Mactaquac	Meriet Gray Miller	NB NDP candidate for Carleton-Victoria in the 2020 New Brunswick provincial election	Upper Kent	Student	3,656	10.63	3rd

== Newfoundland and Labrador ==
Riding	Candidate's Name	Notes	Residence	Occupation	Votes	%	Rank
Avalon	Carolyn Davis	NL NDP candidate for Placentia West-Bellevue in the 2021 Newfoundland and Labrador provincial election	Portugal Cove–St. Philip's		5,151	13.87	3rd
Bonavista—Burin—Trinity	Anne Marie Anonsen	NL NDP candidate for Terra Nova in the 2021 Newfoundland and Labrador provincial election NDP candidate for St. John's South—Mount Pearl in the 2019 federal election	St. John's		2,484	8.28	3rd
Coast of Bays—Central—Notre Dame	Jamie Ruby	NL NDP candidate for Stephenville-Port au Port in the 2021 Newfoundland and Labrador provincial election	St. John's	Self-employed	2,261	7.10	3rd
Labrador	Amy Norman	NL NDP candidate for Lake Melville in the 2021 Newfoundland and Labrador provincial election	Happy Valley-Goose Bay	Pharmacy assistant	2,297	23.80	3rd
Long Range Mountains	Kaila Mintz		Corner Brook	Advisor	4,347	11.93	3rd
St. John's East	Mary Shortall	President of the Newfoundland and Labrador Federation of Labour (2013–2022); NDP candidate for Gander—Grand Falls in the 1997 federal election	St. John's	Union leader	13,090	34.29	2nd
St. John's South—Mount Pearl	Ray Critch		St. John's	Lawyer	8,113	23.40	2nd

== Nova Scotia ==
Riding	Candidate's Name	Notes	Residence	Occupation	Votes	%	Rank
Cape Breton—Canso	Jana Reddick		Glace Bay		5,618	14.27	3rd
Central Nova	Betsy MacDonald	NDP candidate for Central Nova in the 2019 federal election	Antigonish	Communications professional	6,225	15.38	3rd
Cumberland—Colchester	Daniel Osborne		Amherst	Student	4,984	12.33	3rd
Dartmouth—Cole Harbour	Kevin Payne		Dartmouth	Technician	15,267	33.46	2nd
Halifax	Lisa Roberts	Member of the Nova Scotia House of Assembly for Halifax Needham (2016–2021)	Convoy Place, Halifax	Journalist	20,347	39.70	2nd
Halifax West	Jonathan Keith Roberts		Halifax	Professor at Mount Saint Vincent University	12,331	24.16	2nd
Kings—Hants	Stephen Schneider	NDP candidate for Kings—Hants in the 2019 federal election NS NDP candidate for Kings South in the 2017 Nova Scotia provincial election	Wolfville	Professor at Saint Mary's University	8,645	19.23	3rd
Sackville—Preston—Chezzetcook	Jenna Chisholm		Middle Sackville	Healthcare worker	12,012	26.34	3rd
South Shore—St. Margarets	Olivia Dorey		Mahone Bay	Healthcare worker	9,541	19.08	3rd
Sydney—Victoria	Jeff Ward		Membertou	Manager	7,217	19.87	3rd
West Nova	Cheryl Burbidge	NS NDP candidate for Annapolis in the 2021 Nova Scotia provincial election	Hampton	Nurse	5,645	12.87	3rd

== Ontario ==
=== Central Ontario ===
Riding	Candidate's Name	Notes	Residence	Occupation	Votes	%	Rank
Barrie—Innisfil	Aleesha Gostkowski		Innisfil	Student	8,349	15.77	3rd
Barrie—Springwater—Oro-Medonte	Sarah Lochhead		Barrie		8,910	17.06	3rd
Dufferin—Caledon	Samantha Sanchez		Bolton	Lawyer	6,866	10.47	3rd
Durham	Chris Cameron		Oshawa	Marketing professional	11,865	17.52	3rd
Haliburton—Kawartha Lakes—Brock	Zac Miller	ONDP candidate for Haliburton—Kawartha Lakes—Brock in the 2018 Ontario provincial election	Pontypool	Student	9,730	14.37	3rd
Northumberland—Peterborough South	Kim McArthur-Jackson		Campbellford	Consultant	9,809	14.07	3rd
Peterborough—Kawartha	Joy Lachica		Peterborough	Teacher	13,302	18.95	3rd
Simcoe—Grey	Lucas Gillies		Midland	Paramedic	10,140	13.21	3rd
Simcoe North	Janet-Lynne Durnford		Orillia	Teacher	9,958	15.66	3rd
York—Simcoe	Benjamin Jenkins		Barrie	Student	6,800	13.65	3rd

=== Eastern Ontario/Ottawa ===
Riding	Candidate's Name	Notes	Residence	Occupation	Votes	%	Rank
Bay of Quinte	Stephanie Bell	NDP candidate for Bay of Quinte in the 2019 federal election	Picton		9,284	15.05	3rd
Carleton	Kevin Hua	NDP candidate for Carleton in the 2019 federal election	Stittsville	Student (Carleton University)	8,164	11.52	3rd
Glengarry—Prescott—Russell	Konstantine Malakos	NDP candidate for Glengarry—Prescott—Russell in the 2019 federal election	Sainte-Justine-de-Newton		7,022	10.65	3rd
Hastings—Lennox and Addington	Matilda DeBues		Peterborough	Assistant	6,020	11.01	3rd
Kanata—Carleton	Melissa Coenraad	NDP candidate for Kanata—Carleton in the 2019 federal election	Kanata, Ottawa	Laboratory technician	8,317	12.46	3rd
Kingston and the Islands	Vic Sahai		Kingston	Epidemiologist	19,775	29.29	2nd
Lanark—Frontenac—Kingston	Steve Garrison		Kingston	Teacher	9,828	15.62	3rd
Leeds—Grenville—Thousand Islands and Rideau Lakes	Michelle Taylor	NDP candidate for Leeds—Grenville—Thousand Islands and Rideau Lakes in the 2019 federal election ONDP candidate for Leeds—Grenville—Thousand Islands and Rideau Lakes in the 2018 Ontario provincial election	Athens	Student	8,863	14.95	3rd
Nepean	Sean Devine	NDP candidate for Nepean in the 2015 federal election	Trend-Arlington, Ottawa	Playwright / Actor	10,786	16.41	3rd
Orléans	Jessica Joanis		Orleans, Ottawa	Teacher	10,983	14.59	3rd
Ottawa Centre	Angella MacEwen	NDP candidate for Ottawa West—Nepean in the 2019 federal election	Centretown, Ottawa	Economist	24,552	33.03	2nd
Ottawa South	Huda Mukbil		Findlay Creek, Ottawa	Intelligence officer	11,514	19.35	3rd
Ottawa—Vanier	Lyse-Pascale Inamuco			Consultant	13,703	23.61	2nd
Ottawa West—Nepean	Yavar Hameed		Ottawa	Lawyer / Professor at Carleton University	11,163	19.45	3rd
Renfrew—Nipissing—Pembroke	Jodie Primeau		Deep River	Lawyer	12,263	20.96	2nd
Stormont—Dundas—South Glengarry	Trevor Kennedy		Kawartha Lakes	Student	5,804	11.02	3rd

=== Greater Toronto Area ===
Riding	Candidate's Name	Notes	Residence	Occupation	Votes	%	Rank
Ajax	Monique Hughes	ONDP candidate for Ajax in the 2018 Ontario provincial election	Pickering	Educator	6,988	14.04	3rd
Aurora—Oak Ridges—Richmond Hill	Janice Hagan		Markham		3,594	7.83	3rd
Beaches—East York	Alejandra Ruiz Vargas		Toronto	Social worker	11,513	22.52	2nd
Brampton Centre	Jim McDowell		Amaranth	Auto worker	5,932	17.46	3rd
Brampton East	Gail Bannister-Clarke		Brampton	Teacher	6,511	15.75	3rd
Brampton North	Teresa Yeh		Brampton	Teacher	6,448	14.94	3rd
Brampton South	Tejinder Singh		Brampton	Real estate broker	5,894	14.23	3rd
Brampton West	Gurprit Gill		Brampton		6,097	13.08	3rd
Burlington	Nick Page		Hamilton	Consultant	7,507	10.86	3rd
Davenport	Alejandra Bravo		Davenport, Toronto	Director	19,854	41.97	2nd
Don Valley East	Simon Topp		Toronto	Administrator	4,618	12.37	3rd
Don Valley North	Bruce Griffin	ONDP candidate for Don Valley North in the 2019 federal election	Toronto	Musician	4,304	10.62	3rd
Don Valley West	Syeda Riaz		Toronto		3,814	8.11	3rd
Eglinton—Lawrence	Caleb Senneker		Toronto		4,543	9.16	3rd
Etobicoke Centre	Ashley Da Silva		Toronto		5,804	10.09	3rd
Etobicoke—Lakeshore	Sasha Kane		Etobicoke	Supervisor	8,775	13.70	3rd
Etobicoke North	Cecil Peter		Brampton	Teacher	3,708	10.43	3rd
Humber River—Black Creek	Matias de Dovitiis		Jane and Finch, Toronto	Civil servant	5,279	16.40	3rd
King—Vaughan	Sandra Lozano		Woodbridge, Vaughan	Lawyer	3,234	6.47	3rd
Markham—Stouffville	Muhammad Ahsin Sahi		Milton	Lawyer	4,961	8.50	3rd
Markham—Thornhill	Paul Sahbaz	NDP candidate for Markham—Thornhill in the 2019 federal election	Markham	Fundraiser	3,222	8.36	3rd
Markham—Unionville	Aftab Qureshi		Markham	Small business owner	3,001	6.44	3rd
Milton	Muhammad Riaz Sahi		Milton	Lawyer	4,925	8.89	3rd
Mississauga Centre	Teneshia Samuel		Mississauga	Consultant	5,331	11.24	3rd
Mississauga East—Cooksville	Tom Takacs	NDP candidate for Mississauga East—Cooksville in the 2019 federal election ONDP candidate for Mississauga East—Cooksville in the 2018 Ontario provincial election	Woodbridge, Vaughan	Electrician	4,678	10.26	3rd
Mississauga—Erin Mills	Kaukab Usman		Mississauga	Consultant	5,178	10.22	3rd
Mississauga—Lakeshore	Sarah Walji	NDP candidate for Mississauga Centre in the 2019 federal election	Mississauga	Nurse	5,488	9.75	3rd
Mississauga—Streetsville	Waseem Ahmed	NDP candidate for Mississauga—Malton in the 2015 federal election ONDP candidate in Mississauga East—Cooksville in the 2011 provincial election NDP candidate for Mississauga East—Cooksville in the 2011 federal election	Mississauga	Small business owner	5,771	13.99	3rd
Newmarket—Aurora	Yvonne Kelly	NDP candidate for Newmarket—Aurora in the 2019 federal election	Tottenham	Social worker	6,338	11.46	3rd
Oakville	Jerome Adamo	NDP candidate for Oakville in the 2019 federal election	Oakville	Educator	5,373	8.81	3rd
Oakville North—Burlington	Lenaee Dupuis		Burlington	Human resources professional	6,574	9.96	3rd
Oshawa	Shailene Panylo	NDP candidate for Oshawa in the 2019 federal election	Oshawa	Consultant	16,079	28.50	2nd
Parkdale—High Park	Paul M. Taylor	NDP candidate for Parkdale—High Park in the 2019 federal election	Roncesvalles, Toronto	Director	20,602	39.21	2nd
Pickering—Uxbridge	Eileen Higdon	NDP candidate for Pickering—Uxbridge in the 2019 federal election	Pickering	Nurse	7,592	13.05	3rd
Scarborough—Agincourt	Larisa Julius	NDP candidate for Scarborough—Agincourt in the 2019 federal election	Agincourt, Scarborough	Student	3,679	10.04	3rd
Scarborough Centre	Faiz Kamal	NDP candidate for Scarborough Centre in the 2019 federal election	Scarborough	Business analyst	5,479	13.64	3rd
Scarborough—Guildwood	Michelle Spencer	NDP candidate for Scarborough—Guildwood in the 2019 federal election	Scarborough City Centre, Toronto	Civil servant	5,091	13.56	3rd
Scarborough North	Christina Love		Pickering	Student	3,514	11.05	3rd
Scarborough—Rouge Park	Kingsley Kwok	NDP candidate for Scarborough—Rouge Park in the 2019 federal election	Malvern, Toronto	Respiratory therapist	6,068	13.27	3rd
Scarborough Southwest	Guled Arale		Toronto	Assistant	6,924	16.04	3rd
Spadina—Fort York	Norm Di Pasquale	Toronto Catholic District School Board Trustee for Ward 9 (2018–2022)	Toronto	IT professional	16,833	34.5	2nd
Thornhill	Raz Razvi		Langstaff	Professor	3,041	6.07	3rd
Toronto Centre	Brian Chang	NDP candidate for Toronto Centre in the 2019 federal election	Toronto	Researcher	11,909	25.99	2nd
Toronto—Danforth	Clare Hacksel		Riverdale, Toronto	Lecturer at Toronto Metropolitan University	17,555	33.67	2nd
Toronto—St. Paul's	Sidney Coles		Roncesvalles, Toronto	Manager	9,036	16.83	3rd
University—Rosedale	Nicole Robicheau		Toronto		11,921	25.24	2nd
Vaughan—Woodbridge	Peter Michael DeVita	NDP candidate for Vaughan—Woodbridge in the 2019 federal election	Richmond Hill	Engineer	3,265	6.92	3rd
Whitby	Brian Dias	NDP candidate for Whitby in the 2019 federal election	Toronto	Factory worker	8,766	14.12	3rd
Willowdale	Hal Berman	NDP candidate for Markham—Stouffville in the 2019 federal election	Toronto	Physician	4,231	10.29	3rd
York Centre	Kemal Ahmed		Clanton Park, Toronto	Software engineer	3,753	10.18	3rd
York South—Weston	Hawa Mire		Westminster-Branson, Toronto	Consultant	6,517	16.90	3rd

=== Hamilton/Niagara ===
Riding	Candidate's Name	Notes	Residence	Occupation	Votes	%	Rank
Flamborough—Glanbrook	Lorne Newick		Hamilton	Electrician	9,409	15.66	3rd
Hamilton Centre	Matthew Green	Member of Parliament for Hamilton Centre (2019–2025); Member of Hamilton City Council for Ward 3 - Hamilton Centre (2014–2018)	Hamilton		20,105	48.70	1st
Hamilton East—Stoney Creek	Nick Milanovic	NDP candidate for Hamilton East—Stoney Creek in the 2019 federal election	Stoney Creek	Lawyer	12,748	25.60	3rd
Hamilton Mountain	Malcolm Allen	Member of Parliament for Welland (2008–2015); Member of Pelham Town Council for Ward 1 (2003–2008)	Hamilton	Electrician	15,706	32.41	2nd
Hamilton West—Ancaster—Dundas	Roberto Henriquez		Hamilton	Lawyer	12,432	19.79	3rd
Niagara Centre	Melissa McGlashan		Welland		14,086	23.96	3rd
Niagara Falls	Brian Barker	NDP candidate for Niagara Falls in the 2019 federal election	Niagara Falls	Teacher	12,871	18.22	3rd
Niagara West	Nameer Rahman	NDP candidate for Niagara West in the 2019 federal election	Grimsby	Policy advisor	7,064	12.78	3rd
St. Catharines	Trecia McLennon		St. Catharines	Educator / Consultant	12,294	21.08	3rd

=== Northern Ontario ===
Riding	Candidate's Name	Notes	Residence	Occupation	Votes	%	Rank
Algoma—Manitoulin—Kapuskasing	Carol Hughes	Member of Parliament for Algoma—Manitoulin—Kapuskasing (2008–2025)	Hanmer		15,895	40.22	1st
Kenora	Janine Seymour		Kenora	Lawyer	7,801	29.91	2nd
Nickel Belt	Andréane Simone Chénier		Hanmer	Union official (CUPE)	13,137	26.64	3rd
Nipissing—Timiskaming	Scott Robertson	Member of North Bay City Council (2018–2022)	North Bay		10,493	22.09	3rd
Parry Sound—Muskoka	Heather Hay		Gravenhurst		9,339	16.83	3rd
Sault Ste. Marie	Marie Morin-Strom	Daughter of Karl Morin-Strom	Sault Ste. Marie	Teacher	8,041	20.01	3rd
Sudbury	Nadia Verrelli		Sudbury	Professor at Laurentian University	13,569	29.52	2nd
Thunder Bay—Rainy River	Yuk-Sem Won	NDP candidate for Thunder Bay—Rainy River in the 2019 federal election	Thunder Bay	Instructor at Confederation College/Artist	11,342	28.45	3rd
Thunder Bay—Superior North	Chantelle Bryson		Thunder Bay	Lawyer	11,244	27.11	2nd
Timmins—James Bay	Charlie Angus	Member of Parliament for Timmins—James Bay (2004–2025); Northeastern Catholic District School Board Trustee (2000–2004)	Cobalt	Musician / Writer	12,132	35.09	1st

=== Southwestern Ontario ===
Riding	Candidate's Name	Notes	Residence	Occupation	Votes	%	Rank
Brantford—Brant	Adrienne Roberts	NDP candidate for Haldimand—Norfolk in the 2019 federal election	Brantford	Teacher	12,964	19.61	3rd
Bruce—Grey—Owen Sound	Christopher Neudorf		Owen Sound	Teacher	7,939	13.59	3rd
Cambridge	Lorne Bruce	NDP candidate for Kitchener South—Hespeler in the 2015 federal election	Kitchener	Retail manager	9,319	16.99	3rd
Chatham-Kent—Leamington	Dan Gelinas		Wheatley		8,007	14.60	3rd
Elgin—Middlesex—London	Katelyn Cody		Ailsa Craig	Receptionist	10,086	15.99	3rd
Essex	Tracey Ramsey	Member of Parliament for Essex (2015–2019)	Belle River	Union organizer	22,278	31.84	2nd
Guelph	Aisha Jahangir	NDP candidate for Guelph in the 2019 federal election	Guelph	Nurse	14,713	21.09	3rd
Haldimand—Norfolk	Meghan Piironen		Hagersville	Student	8,320	13.29	3rd
Huron—Bruce	Jan Johnstone	ONDP candidate for Huron—Bruce in the 2018 Ontario provincial election	Kincardine		9,056	14.80	3rd
Kitchener Centre	Beisan Zubi		Kitchener	Consultant	8,938	17.46	3rd
Kitchener—Conestoga	Narine Dat Sookram		Kitchener	Social worker	5,948	11.67	3rd
Kitchener South—Hespeler	Suresh Arangath		Kitchener	Financial advisor	8,079	16.27	3rd
Lambton—Kent—Middlesex	Jason Henry	Chief of Chippewas of Kettle and Stony Point First Nation (?–2022)	Kettle & Stony Point		11,107	18.30	3rd
London—Fanshawe	Lindsay Mathyssen	Member of Parliament for London—Fanshawe (2019–2025)	London		22,336	43.44	1st
London North Centre	Dirka Prout	NDP candidate for London North Centre in the 2019 federal election	London	Engineer	15,611	26.63	3rd
London West	Shawna Lewkowitz	NDP candidate for London West in the 2019 federal election	London	Instructor	16,858	24.57	3rd
Oxford	Matthew Chambers	NDP candidate for Oxford in the 2019 federal election	Ingersoll	Custodian	11,325	18.28	3rd
Perth—Wellington	Kevin Kruchkywich		Stratford	Actor	9,552	17.19	3rd
Sarnia—Lambton	Adam Kilner	NDP candidate for Sarnia—Lambton in the 2019 federal election	Sarnia	United Church minister	11,990	21.1	2nd
Waterloo	Jonathan Cassels		Waterloo		11,360	19.04	3rd
Wellington—Halton Hills	Noor Jahangir		Guelph	Student	7,050	10.42	3rd
Windsor—Tecumseh	Cheryl Hardcastle	Member of Parliament for Windsor—Tecumseh (2015–2019)	Tecumseh	Journalist	17,465	30.65	2nd
Windsor West	Brian Masse	Member of Parliament for Windsor West (2002–2025); Member of Windsor City Council (1997–2002)	Windsor	Employment specialist	21,541	44.24	1st

== Prince Edward Island ==
Riding	Candidate's Name	Notes	Residence	Occupation	Votes	%	Rank
Cardigan	Lynne Thiele	NDP candidate for Cardigan in the 2019 federal election	Stratford	Teacher	2,168	9.81	3rd
Charlottetown	Margaret Andrade	Candidate in the 2018 New Democratic Party of Prince Edward Island leadership election NDP candidate for Leeds—Grenville—Thousand Islands and Rideau Lakes in the 2015 federal election Former member of Millet Town Council	Charlottetown	Small business owner	2,048	10.72	3rd
Egmont	Lisa Bradshaw		Summerside	Dental assistant	1,688	8.63	4th
Malpeque	Michelle Neill		Oyster Bed Bridge	Union official (PSAC)	1,898	8.01	4th

== Quebec ==
=== Central Quebec ===
Riding	Candidate's Name	Notes	Residence	Occupation	Votes	%	Rank
Bécancour—Nicolet—Saurel	Catherine Gauvin			Nurse	2,550	5.10	4th
Berthier—Maskinongé	Ruth Ellen Brosseau	Member of Parliament for Berthier—Maskinongé (2011–2019)	Yamachiche	Farmer	18,402	33.49	2nd
Joliette	Alexis Beaudet		Victoriaville	Advisor	3,100	5.52	4th
Montcalm	Oulai B. Goué		Ottawa	Teacher	3,218	6.25	4th
Portneuf—Jacques-Cartier	David-Roger Gagnon		Montréal-Ouest		3,223	4.94	4th
Repentigny	Naomie Mathieu Chauvette		Sherbrooke	Student	4,484	7.51	4th
Saint-Maurice—Champlain	Valérie Bergeron		Joliette	Teacher	2,849	5.06	4th
Trois-Rivières	Adis Simidzija		Trois-Rivières	Director	4,680	8.05	4th

=== Eastern Townships/Southern Quebec ===
Riding	Candidate's Name	Notes	Residence	Occupation	Votes	%	Rank
Beauce	François Jacques-Côté		Saint-Elzéar	Clerk	1,654	2.90	5th
Brome—Missisquoi	Andrew Panton		Pierrefonds	Manager	3,828	6.23	4th
Châteauguay—Lacolle	Hannah Wolker		Kanesatake	Cashier	3,752	7.71	4th
Compton—Stanstead	Geneva Allen		Beaconsfield	Student	4,288	7.42	4th
Drummond	François Choquette	Member of Parliament for Drummond (2011–2019)	Drummondville	Teacher	5,709	11.15	4th
Mégantic—L'Érable	Mathieu Boisvert	NDP candidate for Mégantic—L'Érable in the 2019 federal election	Sainte-Catherine	Assistant	1,308	2.82	5th
Richmond—Arthabaska	Nataël Bureau		Montreal	IT professional	2,550	4.46	4th
Saint-Hyacinthe—Bagot	Brigitte Sansoucy	Member of Parliament for Saint-Hyacinthe—Bagot (2015–2019); Member of Saint-Hyacinthe City Council (2009–2015)	Saint-Hyacinthe	Regional development coordinator	6,170	11.63	4th
Saint-Jean	Jeremy Fournier		Saint-Jean-sur-Richelieu	Student	4,308	7.28	4th
Salaberry—Suroît	Joan Gottman		Très-Saint-Rédempteur		4,529	7.44	4th
Shefford	Patrick Jasmin		Shefford	Paramedic	3,173	5.32	4th
Sherbrooke	Marika Lalime		Sherbrooke	Notary	8,107	13.93	3rd

=== Greater Montreal ===
Riding	Candidate's Name	Notes	Residence	Occupation	Votes	%	Rank
Ahuntsic-Cartierville	Ghada Chaabi		Saint-Henri, Montreal	Seniors' care professional	5,844	11.59	3rd
Alfred-Pellan	Cindy Mercer		Ottawa	Dental hygienist	3,946	7.70	4th
Beloeil—Chambly	Marie-Josée Béliveau		Chambly	Geographer	5,524	8.46	4th
Bourassa	Nicholas Ponari		Montreal	Manager	2,956	8.00	3rd
Brossard—Saint-Lambert	Marc Audet		Saint-Lambert	Director	5,442	10.39	4th
Dorval—Lachine—LaSalle	Fabiola Ngamaleu Teumeni		LaSalle, Montreal	University student	6,241	12.96	3rd
Hochelaga	Catheryn Roy-Goyette	NDP candidate for Hochelaga in the 2019 federal election	Montreal	Union official	9,723	20.38	3rd
Honoré-Mercier	Paulina Ayala	Member of Parliament for Honoré-Mercier (2011–2015)	Montreal	Teacher	3,537	7.31	4th
La Pointe-de-l'Île	Alexandre Vallerand		Montreal	Self-employed	4,954	9.70	3rd
La Prairie	Victoria Hernandez		Sainte-Catherine	Lawyer	4,317	7.30	4th
Lac-Saint-Louis	Jonathan Gray		Dollard-des-Ormeaux	Teacher	7,679	13.30	3rd
LaSalle—Émard—Verdun	Jason De Lierre		Verdun, Montreal	Website developer	9,168	19.36	3rd
Laurier—Sainte-Marie	Nimâ Machouf	NDP candidate for Laurier—Sainte-Marie in the 2019 federal election Projet Montréal candidate in the 2009 and 2005 Montreal municipal election	Le Plateau-Mont-Royal, Montreal	Epidemiologist	14,680	32.86	2nd
Laval—Les Îles	Rowan Woodmass		Montreal	Website designer	3,889	7.69	4th
Longueuil—Charles-LeMoyne	Kalden Dhatsenpa	NDP candidate for Longueuil—Charles-LeMoyne in the 2019 federal election	Le Vieux-Longueuil	Writer	4,957	10.33	3rd
Longueuil—Saint-Hubert	Mildred Murray		Cumberland	Student	4,553	7.95	3rd
Marc-Aurèle-Fortin	Ali Faour	Québec solidaire candidate for Robert-Baldwin in the 2014 Quebec provincial election	Laval	Businessman	4,461	8.56	4th
Montarville	Djaouida Sellah	Member of Parliament for Saint-Bruno—Saint-Hubert (2011–2015)	Longueuil	Financial advisor	4,809	8.37	4th
Mont Royal	Ibrahim Bruno El-Khoury		Montreal	Professor	3,381	8.38	3rd
Notre-Dame-de-Grâce—Westmount	Emma Elbourne-Weinstock		Mile End, Montreal	Assistant	8,753	19.20	2nd
Outremont	Ève Péclet	Member of Parliament for La Pointe-de-l'Île (2011–2015)	Outremont, Montreal	Lawyer	9,579	26.02	2nd
Papineau	Christine Paré		Park Extension, Montreal	Researcher	10,303	22.68	2nd
Pierre-Boucher—Les Patriotes—Verchères	Martin Leprohon		Saint-Basile-le-Grand	Engineer	4,261	7.71	4th
Pierrefonds—Dollard	Maninderjit Kaur Tumbar		LaSalle, Montreal		6,034	11.54	3rd
Rivière-des-Mille-Îles	Joseph Hakizimana	NDP candidate for Rivière-des-Mille-Îles in the 2019 federal election	Mirabel	Healthcare services manager	3,852	7.22	4th
Rosemont—La Petite-Patrie	Alexandre Boulerice	Member of Parliament for Rosemont—La Petite-Patrie (2011–present)	Montreal	Journalist	26,708	48.57	1st
Saint-Laurent	Nathan Devereaux		Montreal	Student	4,059	10.88	3rd
Saint-Léonard—Saint-Michel	Alicia Di Tullio		Saint-Leonard, Montreal	Childcare worker	3,460	8.27	3rd
Terrebonne	Luke Mayba		Terrebonne	Teacher	3,913	6.64	4th
Thérèse-De Blainville	Julienne Soumaoro		Montreal	Teacher	3,827	7.32	4th
Vaudreuil—Soulanges	Niklas Brake		Montreal	Neuroscientist	6,780	10.50	4th
Ville-Marie—Le Sud-Ouest—Île-des-Sœurs	Sophie Thiébaut	Member of Sud-Ouest borough council (2009–2021)	Montreal		9,241	18.70	2nd
Vimy	Vassif Aliev		Montreal	Environmental inspector	4,731	9.30	4th

=== Northern Quebec ===
Riding	Candidate's Name	Notes	Residence	Occupation	Votes	%	Rank
Abitibi—Baie-James—Nunavik—Eeyou	Pauline Lameboy	Member of Chisasibi Town Council (2016–2021)	Chisasibi		3,323	11.69	4th
Abitibi—Témiscamingue	Bethany Stewart		Wemindji	University student	2,794	6.12	4th
Chicoutimi—Le Fjord	Ismaël Raymond		Chicoutimi	Technician	1,944	4.63	4th
Jonquière	Marieve Ruel		Jonquière	Administrator	2,559	5.63	4th
Lac-Saint-Jean	Mathieu Chambers		Alma	IT consultant	1,637	3.26	4th
Manicouagan	Nichola St-Jean		Quebec City		1,509	4.31	4th

=== Quebec City/Gaspe/Eastern Quebec ===
Riding	Candidate's Name	Notes	Residence	Occupation	Votes	%	Rank
Avignon—La Mitis—Matane—Matapédia	Christel Marchand		Montreal	Editor	1,501	4.54	4th
Beauport—Côte-de-Beaupré—Île d'Orléans—Charlevoix	Frédéric Du Verle		Montreal	Urban planner	2,242	4.47	4th
Beauport—Limoilou	Camille Esther Garon		Cité-Universitaire, Quebec City	Event planner	5,075	10.43	4th
Bellechasse—Les Etchemins—Lévis	Marie-Philippe Gagnon Gauthier		Trois-Pistoles	Public relations professional	3,184	5.04	4th
Charlesbourg—Haute-Saint-Charles	Michel Marc Lacroix		Val-des-Monts	Professor	3,446	6.01	4th
Gaspésie—Les Îles-de-la-Madeleine	Lisa Phung		Montreal	University student	1,358	3.68	4th
Lévis—Lotbinière	Guylaine Dumont		Saint-Antoine-de-Tilly	Therapist	4,497	7.09	4th
Louis-Hébert	Hamid Nadji	NDPQ candidate for Jean-Talon in the 2018 Quebec provincial election	Quebec City	Real estate broker	4,337	7.25	4th
Louis-Saint-Laurent	Yu-Ti Eva Huang		Quebec City	Teacher	3,370	5.26	4th
Montmagny—L'Islet—Kamouraska—Rivière-du-Loup	Sean English	NDP candidate for Pierre-Boucher—Les Patriotes—Verchères in the 2019 federal election	Montreal	Copywriter	1,597	3.34	4th
Québec	Tommy Bureau	NDP candidate for Québec in the 2019 federal election	Saint-Roch, Quebec City	Union official (CSQ)	6,652	12.99	4th
Rimouski-Neigette—Témiscouata—Les Basques	Sylvain Lajoie		Montreal	Researcher	2,641	6.27	4th

=== Western Quebec/Laurentides/Outaouais ===
Riding	Candidate's Name	Notes	Residence	Occupation	Votes	%	Rank
Argenteuil—La Petite-Nation	Michel Welt		Montreal	Obstetrician-gynecologist	3,390	6.70	4th
Gatineau	Fernanda Rengel		Montreal		4,508	8.59	4th
Hull—Aylmer	Samuel Gendron		Montreal	Project manager	6,483	12.65	3rd
Laurentides—Labelle	Eric-Abel Baland	NDP candidate for Mount Royal in the 2019 federal election	Morin-Heights	Instructor	3,907	6.09	4th
Mirabel	Benoit Bourassa		Saint-Joseph-du-Lac		5,221	8.27	4th
Pontiac	Denise Giroux		Cantley	Lawyer	6,824	11.01	4th
Rivière-du-Nord	Mary-Helen Paspaliaris		Saint-Jérôme	Manager	3,958	6.90	4th

== Saskatchewan ==
Riding	Candidate's Name	Notes	Residence	Occupation	Votes	%	Rank
Battlefords—Lloydminster	Erik Hansen		Unity		3,718	11.98	2nd
Carlton Trail—Eagle Creek	Shannon O'Toole		Marcelin	Healthcare worker	5,608	13.65	2nd
Cypress Hills—Grasslands	Alex McPhee		Val Marie	Cartographer	3,604	10.51	2nd
Desnethé—Missinippi—Churchill River	Harmonie King	Sask NDP candidate for Meadow Lake in the 2020 Saskatchewan provincial election	Meadow Lake	Social worker	3,548	17.25	3rd
Moose Jaw—Lake Centre—Lanigan	Talon Regent	NDP candidate for Moose Jaw—Lake Centre—Lanigan in the 2019 federal election	Moose Jaw	Lawyer	7,975	19.36	2nd
Prince Albert	Ken MacDougall		Muskoday	Teacher	5,214	15.15	2nd
Regina—Lewvan	Tria Donaldson		Regina	Union official (CUPE)	15,763	34.54	2nd
Regina—Qu'Appelle	Annaliese Bos		Regina	Veterinary technician	6,879	20.87	2nd
Regina—Wascana	Erin Hidlebaugh		Moose Jaw		6,975	18.07	3rd
Saskatoon—Grasswood	Kyla Kitzul		Montgomery Place, Saskatoon	Restaurant manager	13,720	30.09	2nd
Saskatoon—University	Claire Card	NDP candidate for Saskatoon—University in the 2019 federal election	North Park, Saskatoon	Veterinarian / Professor at the University of Saskatchewan	15,042	35.38	2nd
Saskatoon West	Robert Doucette	President of the Métis Nation—Saskatchewan (2007–2017)	Brighton, Saskatoon	Director	13,328	39.31	2nd
Souris—Moose Mountain	Hannah Ann Duerr		Saskatoon	Student	3,107	7.90	3rd
Yorkton—Melville	Halsten David Rust		Saskatoon	Manager	4,239	12.23	2nd

== The Territories ==
Riding	Candidate's Name	Notes	Residence	Occupation	Votes	%	Rank
Northwest Territories	Kelvin Kotchilea	Independent candidate for the 2021 Monfwi territorial by-election	Yellowknife/Behchokǫ̀	Civil servant	4,558	32.34	2nd
Nunavut	Lori Idlout		Igloolik	Lawyer / Non-profit executive	3,427	47.67	1st
Yukon	Lisa Vollans-Leduc		Marsh Lake	Policy analyst	4,354	22.44	3rd
