= Keith Martin (politician) =

Canadian politician and physician

The Honourable Doctor Keith Martin PC MD

Member of Parliament for Esquimalt—Juan de Fuca
- In office October 25, 1993 – May 2, 2011
- Preceded by: Dave Barrett
- Succeeded by: Randall Garrison

Personal details
- Born: London, United Kingdom
- Party: Liberal (2004–present)
- Other political affiliations: Reform (1993–2000); Canadian Alliance (2000–2003); Independent (2003–2004)
- Profession: Executive Director, Consortium of Universities for Global Health, Physician, Conservationist

Keith Martin, PC is a Canadian politician and physician. He was the Member of Parliament for the riding of Esquimalt—Juan de Fuca in British Columbia, Canada from 1993 to 2011. Originally a member of the Reform Party, and then the Canadian Alliance, he did not join the newly formed Conservative Party of Canada post-merger, and instead became a member of the Liberal Party from 2004 until 2011.

He is currently the executive director of the Consortium of Universities for Global Health in Washington, D.C.

== Early life and career ==
Martin was born in London, UK, and grew up in Toronto, Ontario, Canada. He attended Neil McNeil High School and graduated from the University of Toronto with a Doctorate of Medicine and a Bachelor of Science.

He practiced emergency and family medicine from 1987 to 2005. He also did two terms as a doctor in a rural region of South Africa during the Mozambique war. Martin is a member of the Royal College of Physicians and Surgeons' Advisory Committee on International Initiatives.

== Federal politics ==
He was first elected in 1993 as a member of the Reform Party of Canada for the riding of Esquimalt-Juan de Fuca. Being socially liberal, he often clashed with the Reform's conservative ideas.

From 1996 to 2000 he had his own nationally syndicated television program on current events called Beyond Politics.

When the Reform Party was folded into the Canadian Alliance, he sought the party leadership, but finished fourth with 2% of the vote.

In both 2009 and 2010, political commentator Rex Murphy, from the Canadian Broadcasting Corporation's The National, recognized Martin as the most underrated politician in the House of Commons.

Martin led many initiatives in the House of Commons, including legislation to ban landmines (1995, 1996), establish an international mechanism to prevent deadly conflict (Responsibility to Protect) 2007, democratize Parliament, support early learning programs (Head Start) 2000, and modernize Canada's healthcare system.

Martin has been on diplomatic missions to areas in crisis, including Sudan, the Middle East, Zimbabwe, Sierra Leone, and the Sahal. He led initiatives to provide emergency relief in times of crisis, e.g., the 2004 tsunami, famine in Niger, North Pakistan, Democratic Republic of the Congo, Zimbabwe, etc. He also took an international leadership role in global health, including chairing global pre-G8 parliamentary committees in Japan and Rome.

He's had experience between 1986–2007 volunteering on conservation programs in Africa, especially on rhino and other large mammals projects. He has been an ardent campaigner against the trafficking of illegal wildlife products, and has strongly supported the integration of conservation into development initiatives.

On April 17, 2002, he caused a controversy as he attempted to remove the ceremonial mace from the table of the Clerk of the House to protest an intervention by the government that violated MP's fundamental democratic rights. He was found to be in contempt and not allowed to retake his seat until he had apologized to the House from the Bar. The reason for his actions was as a result of an amendment that would have removed the entire contents of Martin's Private Members' Bill C-344 which violated the spirit and meaning of Private Members Business.

=== Liberal ===
In January 2004, after the Canadian Alliance merged with the centre-right Progressive Conservative Party to form the Conservative Party of Canada, Martin announced he would not join the new party. He sat as an independent for the remainder of the 37th Parliament, but ran as a Liberal in the 2004 election. He was re-elected, and served as the Parliamentary Secretary to the Minister of National Defence. Martin was subsequently re-elected in the 2006 and 2008 federal elections. He has served in many shadow cabinet positions including foreign affairs, health and international development. He has taken leadership roles in many areas including: global health, domestic health, foreign affairs, conservation and the environment and human rights. He was appointed in 2004 by Prime Minister Paul Martin to be a member of the Queen's Privy Council.

Martin has organized several relief efforts to ship urgent medical supplies to areas in crisis.

He is the founder of several global health and conservation initiatives. He is Founder and Chair of the first all Party International Conservation Caucus. In 2010, he founded the International Conservation Forum, a website that increases awareness and facilitates action on key conservation issues through the use of social media and the publication of the online magazine - The Horn.

On November 9, 2010, Martin announced that he wouldn't run in the next election, stating that "Canada's institutions need new blood and new ideas." He's been an outspoken critic of the decline in democracy in parliament and the increasing disempowerment of Members of Parliament.

== Post-politics career ==
In September 2012, Martin was appointed as the founding Executive Director of the Consortium of Universities for Global Health (CUGH). With over 170 academic institutions and a network of 30,000 scientists worldwide, CUGH is the world's largest consortium of its kind. It works across research, education, advocacy and service, across disciplines, to improve the health of people and the planet. CUGH is particularly focused on improving health and environmental outcomes in low-income communities.

November 2014, Martin made presentations on the nexus between environmental sustainability, conservation, and human health at the World Parks Congress in Sydney, Australia. He regularly speaks at conferences on a wide range of global health issues (www.cugh.org) covering health, conservation, the environment and politics. He has co-chaired CUGH's last 7 global health conferences that attract over 1800 scientists and students from over 50 nations. He is a member of the Lancet Commission on Pollution and Health, a member of the editorial Board of the Annals of Global Health, a member of the Board of Directors of the Jane Goodall Institute and an adviser to the International Cancer Expert Corps.
