= Consortium of Universities for Global Health =

U.S.-based nonprofit organization

- Founded: 2008
- Type: International organization International NGO
- Purpose: Global health, especially within academia and between academia and other global health practice areas.
- Location: Washington, D.C.
- Region served: Worldwide
- Key people: Keith Martin (physician), Executive Director
- Website: www.cugh.org

The Consortium of Universities for Global Health (CUGH), established in 2008, is a membership-based nonprofit organization focusing on global health. Its members are primarily institutions, although individuals can also become members. CUGH members currently include over 145 academic institutions and other organizations. CUGH was established in 2008 with funding from the Bill & Melinda Gates Foundation and The Rockefeller Foundation.

== Annual conference ==
Since 2009, CUGH has held an annual conference for global health academics and practitioners.

- The fourth annual conference, held March 14–16, 2013, in Washington, D.C., had over 1,400 attendees, representing 56 countries and 721 institutions. Speakers at the conference included Dr. Agnes Binagwaho, the Minister of Health of Rwanda, Ambassador Eric Goosby of PEPFAR, and USAID Administrator Dr. Rajiv Shah.
- The fifth annual conference was held May 10–12, 2014, in Washington, D.C. The theme was "Universities 2.0: Advancing the Global Health Agenda in the Post-MDG Era."
- The seventh annual conference, April 8–11, 2016, in San Francisco, had over 1,800 attendees and the theme was "Bridging to a Sustainable Future in Global Health".
- The eighth annual conference was held April 7–9, 2017, in Washington, D.C., with the theme of "Healthy People, Healthy Ecosystems: Implementation, Leadership & Sustainability in Global Health".

== Member list ==
- Academy of Health Sciences
- AFREHealth
- Aga Khan University
- Albert Einstein College of Medicine
- Association for Socially Applicable Research
- Association of American Medical Colleges
- American Academy of Pediatrics
- American Dental Education Association
- American University of Antigua
- American University of Beirut
- Association of Schools and Programs of Public Health
- Association of American Veterinary Medical Colleges
- Barcelona Institute for Global Health/ISGlobal
- Bay Area Global Health Alliance
- Baylor College of Medicine
- Boston College
- Boston University
- BRAC University
- Brown University
- California University of Science and Medicine
- Canadian Association for Global Health
- Case Western Reserve University
- Commission on Graduates of Foreign Nursing Schools (CGFNS)
- Charles R. Drew University of Medicine and Science
- Chemonics International
- Child Family Health International
- College of Medicine, University of Ibadan
- Columbia University
- CORE Group
- Cornell University
- Covenant University
- CRDF Global
- CSIS Global Health Policy Center
- CUNY Graduate School of Public Health and Health Policy
- Dartmouth College
- Direct Relief
- Drexel University
- Duke University
- Eastern Virginia Medical School
- Ecole Inter-Etats des Sciences et Médicine Vétérinaires
- Educational Commission for Foreign Medical Graduates
- Emory University
- Florida International University
- Friends in Village Development Bangladesh, USA
- Friends in Village Development Bangladesh, Bangladesh
- Fudan University
- George Washington University
- Georgetown University
- Global Health Council
- Harvard University
- Hofstra University
- Hope College
- Howard University
- Icahn School of Medicine at Mount Sinai
- Indiana University
- Instituto Nacional de Salud Publica
- International Cancer Experts Corps, Inc.
- International Cancer Institute
- Johns Hopkins University
- Seoul National University
- Kaiser Permanente Northern California Global Health Program
- Kamuzu University of Health Sciences (formally Kamuzu College of Nursing at the University of Malawi)
- Karolinska Institutet
- Kesmonds International University
- Kilimanjaro Christian Medical University College, Tumaini University Makumira
- Lecturio
- Loma Linda University
- London School of Hygiene & Tropical Medicine, University of London
- Loyola University
- Makerere University
- Mayo Clinic College of Medicine
- McGill University
- McMaster University
- Medical College of Wisconsin
- Medical University of South Carolina
- Memorial Sloan Kettering Cancer Center
- Michigan State University
- Morehouse School of Medicine
- Morgan State University
- New York Institute of Technology
- New York University
- Northeastern University
- Northwestern University
- Ohio State University
- Ohio University
- Phil Simon Clinic Tanzania Project
- Philippine Council for Health Research and Development, Department of Science and Technology
- Princeton University
- Public Health Institute
- Queen’s University
- Research America
- Rice University
- Rush University
- Rutgers, the State University of New Jersey
- Saint Louis University
- San Diego State University
- Sri Siddhartha Academy of Higher Education
- St. Catherine University
- St. George's University
- St. John of God, College of Sciences
- Stanford University
- Stellenbosch University
- Stony Brook University
- Sun Yat-Sen University
- Sudanese American Physicians Association
- SUNY Downstate Health Sciences University
- SUNY Upstate Medical University
- Texas A&M University
- Texas Children's Hospital
- Texas Tech University
- Thomas Jefferson University
- Touro University
- Triangle Global Health Consortium
- Tufts University
- Tulane University
- Tumaini Foundation
- Uniformed Services University of the Health Sciences
- Universidad Peruana Cayetano Heredia
- Universidad San Francisco de Quito
- University at Buffalo
- University of Alabama at Birmingham
- University of Arizona
- University of British Columbia
- University of California, Berkeley
- University of California, Davis
- University of California, Irvine
- University of California, Los Angeles
- University of California, San Diego
- University of California, San Francisco
- University of Chicago
- University of Edinburgh
- University of Georgia
- University of Global Health Equity
- University of Hawaiʻi System
- University of Hong Kong
- University of Illinois at Chicago
- University of Iowa
- University of Kansas
- University of Kentucky
- University of Manitoba
- University of Maryland, Baltimore
- University of Maryland, College Park
- University of Massachusetts Dartmouth
- University of Medicine and Health Sciences
- University of Melbourne
- University of Miami
- University of Michigan
- University of Minnesota, Twin Cities
- University of Nebraska Medical Center
- University of North Carolina at Chapel Hill
- University of Notre Dame
- University of Pennsylvania
- University of Peradeniya
- University of Pittsburgh
- University of Queensland
- University of Southern California
- University of Tennessee Health Science Center
- University of Texas at Houston
- University of Texas Health Science Center at San Antonio
- University of Texas Medical Branch at Galveston
- University of Texas Southwestern Medical Center
- University of Toronto
- University of Utah
- University of Uyo
- University of Vermont
- University of Washington
- University of Wisconsin-Madison
- University of Wollongong
- Vanderbilt University
- VetAgro Sup
- Virginia Polytechnic Institute and State University
- Wake Forest University
- Washington State University
- Washington University in St. Louis
- Wayne State University
- West Virginia University
- Wright State University
- Yale University
- Yantalo Peru Foundation
- Yonsei University
