= Stephanie McLean (politician) =

Canadian lawyer and politician

The Honourable Stephanie McLean PC ECA MP
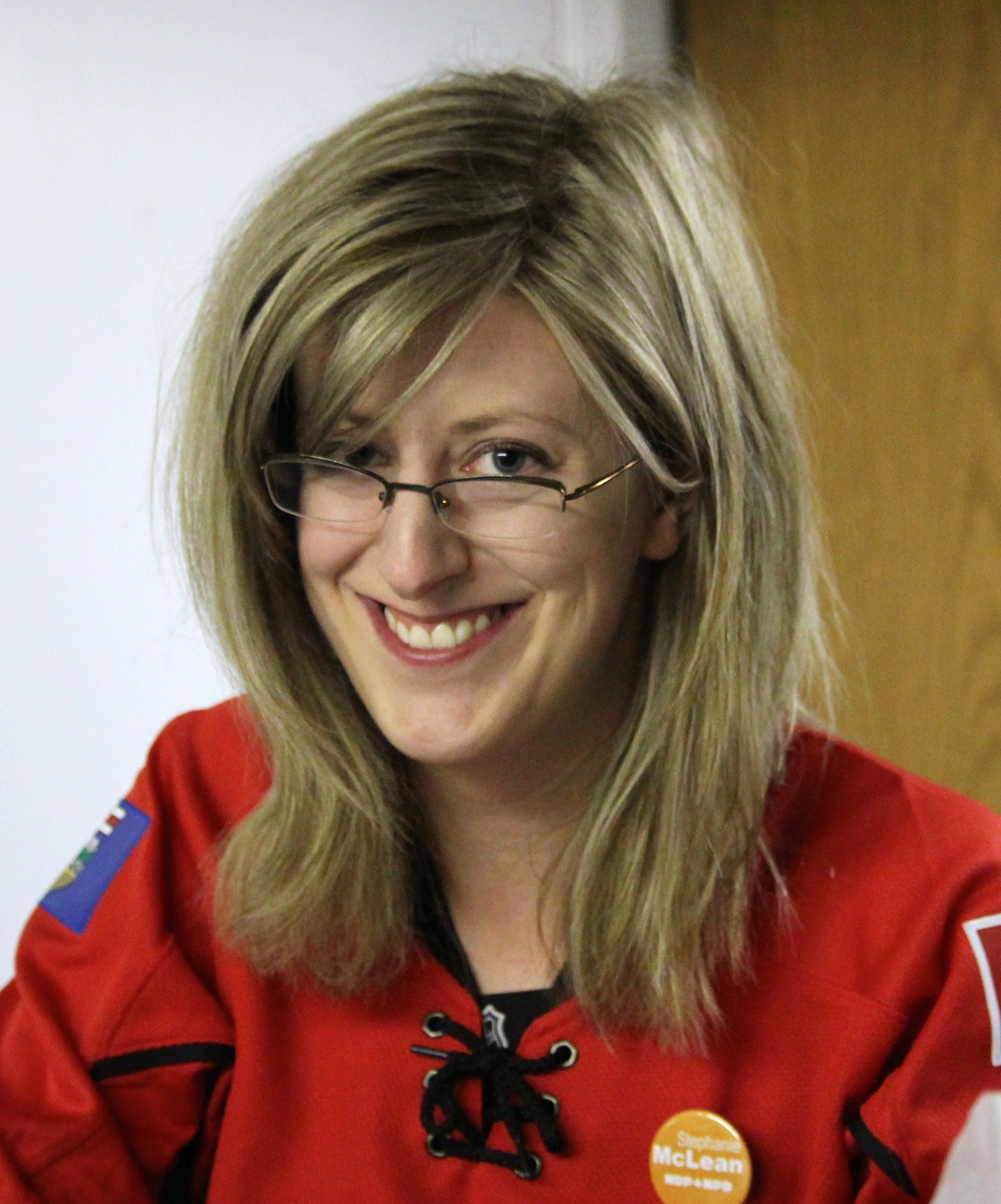
- Photo of Stephanie McLean at her campaign office.

Secretary of State (Seniors)
- Incumbent
- Assumed office May 13, 2025
- Prime Minister: Mark Carney
- Preceded by: Joanne Thompson

Member of Parliament for Esquimalt—Saanich—Sooke
- Incumbent
- Assumed office April 28, 2025
- Preceded by: Randall Garrison

Minister of Service Alberta
- In office February 2, 2016 – June 18, 2018
- Premier: Rachel Notley
- Preceded by: Danielle Larivee
- Succeeded by: Brian Malkinson

Minister of Status of Women
- In office February 2, 2016 – June 18, 2018
- Premier: Rachel Notley
- Preceded by: Ministry Created
- Succeeded by: Danielle Larivee

Member of the Legislative Assembly of Alberta for Calgary-Varsity
- In office May 5, 2015 – January 2, 2019
- Preceded by: Donna Kennedy-Glans
- Succeeded by: Jason Copping

Personal details
- Born: March 2, 1987 (age 39) Calgary, Alberta, Canada
- Party: Liberal (federal, since 2025)
- Other political affiliations: Alberta NDP (provincial, until 2020)
- Education: Concordia University of Edmonton (B.A.); University of Calgary (J.D)
- Occupation: Lawyer

Stephanie Veronica McLean PC ECA MP is a Canadian politician and lawyer who has served as Secretary of State for Seniors since 2025. A member of the Liberal party, she has represented Esquimalt—Saanich—Sooke in the House of Commons of Canada since the 2025 Canadian federal election.

McLean was elected to the Legislative Assembly of Alberta as a member of the New Democratic Party in the 2015 Alberta general election representing Calgary-Varsity. She served as Minister of Status of Women and Minister of Service Alberta from February 2, 2016 to June 18, 2018.

== Early life and education ==
McLean was born in Calgary, Alberta. She earned her Juris Doctor degree from the University of Calgary's law school.

== Political career ==
McLean made history when she became the first Member of the Legislative Assembly of Alberta to give birth while in office. She gave birth to a baby boy, Patrick, on February 12, 2016. McLean's pregnancy sparked questions around the logistics and rules of the Alberta legislature around pregnancy, maternity leave, and support for new parents in the legislature. An all-party committee was created with a mandate to review and make recommendations on maternity leave and making the Legislature more responsive to members' family obligations.

After serving in the Alberta Legislature, McLean moved to Colwood, British Columbia, and returned to practicing law.

On March 31, 2025, she was named the Liberal candidate for the riding of Esquimalt—Saanich—Sooke. She went on to win in the 2025 federal election, receiving 49.4% of the vote.

== Electoral history ==
=== Federal elections ===
2025 Canadian federal election: Esquimalt—Saanich—Sooke
| Party | Candidate | Votes | % | ±% | Expenditures |
|---|---|---|---|---|---|
| Liberal | Stephanie McLean | 36,181 | 49.34 | +27.46 | $116,092.08 |
| Conservative | Grant Cool | 21,082 | 28.75 | +7.78 | $101,432.32 |
| New Democratic | Maja Tait | 13,666 | 18.64 | –24.60 | $78,201.75 |
| Green | Ben Homer-Dixon | 1,959 | 2.67 | –6.22 | $17,629.61 |
| Christian Heritage | David Schaafsma | 159 | 0.22 | – | $3,519.03 |
| Independent | Param Bhatti | 152 | 0.21 | – | $181.44 |
| Communist | Robert Crooks | 136 | 0.19 | –0.19 | none listed |
| Total valid votes/expense limit | | 73,335 | 99.47 | – | $143,722.25 |
| Total rejected ballots | | 391 | 0.53 | –0.32 | |
| Turnout | | 73,726 | 74.18 | +10.08 | |
| Eligible voters | | 99,386 | | | |
| Liberal notional gain from New Democratic | | Swing | | +26.03 | |
Source: Elections Canada

=== Provincial elections ===
2015 Alberta general election: Calgary-Varsity
| Party | Candidate | Votes | % | ±% |
|---|---|---|---|---|
| New Democratic | Stephanie McLean | 8,297 | 43.94 | +39.31 |
| Progressive Conservative | Susan Billington | 5,700 | 30.19 | -15.71 |
| Wildrose | Sharon Polsky | 2,598 | 13.76 | -12.45 |
| Liberal | Pete Helfrich | 1,862 | 9.86 | -10.62 |
| Green | Carl Svoboda | 424 | 2.25 | +0.92 |
| Total valid votes | | 18,881 | 99.33 | +0.03 |
| Rejected, spoiled and declined | | 127 | 0.67 | -0.03 |
| Eligible voters / turnout | | 32,467 | 58.55 | -1.30 |
| New Democratic gain from Progressive Conservative | | Swing | | +27.51 |
Source(s) "2015 Provincial General Election Results". Elections Alberta. Archived from the original on September 28, 2020.

Alberta provincial by-election, October 27, 2014: Calgary-Elbow Resignation of Alison Redford on August 6, 2014
| Party | Candidate | Votes | % | ±% |
|---|---|---|---|---|
| Progressive Conservative | Gordon Dirks | 4,209 | 33.22 | -24.87 |
| Alberta Party | Greg Clark | 3,406 | 26.88 | +24.20 |
| Wildrose | John Fletcher | 3,061 | 24.16 | -4.42 |
| Liberal | Susan Wright | 1,523 | 12.02 | +6.49 |
| New Democratic | Stephanie McLean | 471 | 3.72 | -0.23 |
| Total | | 12,842 | — | — |
| Rejected, spoiled and declined | | 23 | 22 | 2 |
| Eligible electors / turnout | | 34,163 | 37.16 | — |
| Progressive Conservative hold | | Swing | | -24.53 |
Source(s) Alberta. Chief Electoral Officer (2015). Report on the October 27, 2014 By-elections in: Calgary-Elbow, Calgary-Foothills, Calgary-West, Edmonton-Whitemud (PDF) (Report). Edmonton: Legislative Assembly of Alberta; Chief Electoral Officer. ISBN 978-098653678-6.
