= Donna Kennedy-Glans =

Canadian politician

Member of the Legislative Assembly of Alberta for Calgary Varsity
- In office 23 April 2012 – 5 May 2015
- Preceded by: Harry B. Chase
- Succeeded by: Stephanie McLean

Personal details
- Born: 5 May 1960 (age 66) near Tillsonburg, Ontario
- Party: Progressive Conservative (2012–2014); Independent (2014); Progressive Conservative (2014-present)
- Education: Wilfrid Laurier University; University of Western Ontario
- Profession: Businesswoman, Philanthropist

Donna Marie Kennedy-Glans (born 5 May 1960) is a Canadian politician who was elected to the Legislative Assembly of Alberta representing the electoral district of Calgary-Varsity from April 2012 to May 2015. She was elected initially as a member of the Progressive Conservative caucus, and chaired the all-party Standing Committee on Resource Stewardship. On 13 December 2013, she was sworn into the Cabinet of Alberta to fill the newly created post of Associate Minister – Electricity and Renewable Energy.

On 25 October 2012, Kennedy-Glans was one of eight PC MLA and cabinet members who accompanied then Premier Allison Redford on a flight in a government fleet aircraft to attend a PC party fundraiser in Grande Prairie on 25 October 2012. In his 2014 report, then provincial Auditor General Merwan Saher found Redford's use of government fleet aircraft for partisan purposes to be inappropriate.

Kennedy-Glans announced that she was resigning from cabinet and leaving the PC caucus to sit as an independent on 17 March 2014, in protest against the leadership of Alison Redford. She officially rejoined the PC caucus on 17 September 2014, after Jim Prentice assumed the leadership of the party.

Kennedy-Glans declared as a candidate for the leadership of the Alberta Progressive Conservative Party. She withdrew her candidacy in a letter to supporters on 8 November 2016, following the party's Annual General Meeting, saying: "Right now, politics in Alberta is polarizing and there is limited opportunity for centrist voices to be heard." Following Jason Kenney's Progressive Conservative leadership victory Kennedy-Glans announced, that 10 days prior to the vote, she had been named to his transition team.

== Election results ==
2012 Alberta general election: Calgary-Varsity
Party	Candidate	Votes	%	±%
Progressive Conservative	Donna Kennedy-Glans	8,099	45.90	+9.22
Wildrose	Rob Solinger	4,624	26.21	+19.06
Liberal	Bruce Payne	3,614	20.48	-26.85
New Democratic	Jackie Seidel	817	4.63	+1.00
Alberta Party	Alex McBrien	255	1.45	
Evergreen	Carl Svoboda	234	1.33	-3.87
Total valid votes		17,643	99.30	-0.11
Rejected, spoiled and declined		124	0.70	+0.11
Eligible electors / turnout		29,688	59.85	+15.21
Progressive Conservative gain from Liberal		Swing		+18.04
Source(s) Elections Alberta. "Electoral Division Results: Calgary-Varsity".
