= Calgary-Varsity =

Provincial electoral district in Alberta, Canada

Coordinates: 51.09°N 114.14°W

Alberta electoral district
- Calgary-Varsity within the City of Calgary, 2017 boundaries

Provincial electoral district
- Legislature: Legislative Assembly of Alberta
MLA
Luanne Metz
New Democratic
- District created: 1993
- First contested: 1993
- Last contested: 2023

Calgary-Varsity is a provincial electoral district in Calgary, Alberta, Canada. The district was created in 1993 and returns a single member to the Legislative Assembly of Alberta.

It comprises the communities of Varsity, Brentwood, Banff Trail, University Heights, Parkdale, Point Mckay, and Charleswood (part of the Triwood community which also includes Collingwood west of 19th St NW).

== History ==
The electoral district was created in the 1993 boundary redistribution out of parts of three electoral districts. They were Calgary-Foothills, Calgary-North Hill and Calgary-North West.

The 2010 boundary redistribution saw the district only slightly altered. It picked up some land from Calgary-Bow and Calgary-Mountain View when the south boundary was moved south to run completely along the Bow River and it also picked up a few blocks of houses from Calgary-North Hill when the east boundary between 17th Ave NW and 24 Ave NW was moved one block over to 18 Street NW

=== Boundary history ===
23 Calgary-Varsity 2003 boundaries
Bordering districts
North	East	West	South
Calgary-Foothills and Calgary-Nose Hill	Calgary-North Hill	Calgary-Bow and Calgary-North West	Calgary-Mountain View
riding map goes here			
Legal description from the Statutes of Alberta 2003, Electoral Divisions Act.
Starting at the intersection of Sarcee Trail NW with John Laurie Boulevard NW; then 1. southeast along John Laurie Boulevard NW to 19 Street NW; 2. south along 19 Street NW to 16 Avenue NW; 3. west along 16 Avenue NW to Shaganappi Trail NW; 4. north along Shaganappi Trail NW to 32 Avenue NW; 5. west along 32 Avenue NW and its westerly extension to the right bank of the Bow River; 6. north along the right bank of the Bow River to the southerly extension of Silver Springs Boulevard NW; 7. north along the extension and Silver Springs Boulevard NW to Silver Springs Gate NW; 8. east and north along Silver Springs Gate NW to Sarcee Trail NW; 9. north along Sarcee Trail NW to the starting point.
Note:

26 Calgary-Varsity 2010 boundaries
Bordering districts
North	East	West	South
Calgary-Foothills and Calgary-Mackay-Nose Hill	Calgary-Klein	Calgary-Bow and Calgary-Hawkwood	Calgary-Currie and Calgary-Mountain View
Legal description from the Statutes of Alberta 2010, Electoral Divisions Act.

=== Representation history ===
Members of the Legislative Assembly for Calgary-Varsity
Assembly	Years	Member	Party
See Calgary-Foothills and Calgary-North Hill 1971-1993, Calgary-North West 1979-1993
23rd	1993–1997	Murray Smith	Progressive Conservative
24th	1997–2001	Murray Smith	Progressive Conservative
25th	2001–2004	Murray Smith	Progressive Conservative
26th	2004–2008	Harry Chase	Liberal
27th	2008–2012	Harry Chase	Liberal
28th	2012–2014	Donna Kennedy-Glans	Progressive Conservative
28th	2014	Donna Kennedy-Glans	Independent
28th	2014–2015	Donna Kennedy-Glans	Progressive Conservative
29th	2015–2019	Stephanie McLean	New Democratic
29th	2019	Vacant	
30th	2019–2023	Jason Copping	United Conservative
31st	2023–present	Luanne Metz	New Democratic

The electoral district was created in 1993 and comprised land that had existed in three electoral districts. The region at that era had returned a mixture of Liberal and Progressive Conservative representatives.

In the first election in the district held in 1993, the district saw a closely contested race between Progressive Conservative candidate Murray Smith and Liberal candidate Carrol Jaques. Smith would win with a plurality of 47%. Premier Ralph Klein appointed Smith to his first cabinet post as Minister of Economic Development and Tourism in 1994. He would be shuffled to the Labour portfolio in 1996.

Smith and Jaques faced each other again in the 1997 election with both candidates losing popular vote. Smith however won his second term by taking a majority of the ballots cast. After the election Smith kept his Labour portfolio until 1999 when he was shuffled to be the Minister of Gaming.

The 2001 election would see Jaques and Smith face each other for the third time. The result would be a near landslide in Smith's favour. After the election Smith would once again change cabinet portfolios this time becoming Minister of Energy until he retired at dissolution of the assembly in 2004.

Liberal candidate Harry Chase was elected as the second representative of the riding in the 2004 election with nearly 45% of the vote. He won his second term in 2008 with a slightly larger plurality.

In 2012 Progressive Conservative candidate Donna Kennedy-Glans was elected with 46% of the vote. She briefly sat as an independent in protest of Alison Redford's leadership.

In 2015 New Democrat candidate Stephanie McLean was elected with 44% of the vote. After serving in the cabinet of Rachel Notley, she stepped down as MLA shortly before the 2019 election.

In 2019 despite the NDP attracting a star candidate to run in Calgary-Varsity, Anne McGrath, she was defeated by United Conservative candidate Jason Copping.

In 2023 NDP candidate Luanne Metz - a clinical neurologist and researcher - defeated the incumbent Minister of Health, Jason Copping.

== Legislative election results ==
=== 2023 ===
2023 Alberta general election
Party	Candidate	Votes	%	±%
New Democratic	Luanne Metz	13,449	58.27	+14.83
United Conservative	Jason Copping	9,377	40.63	-5.53
Wildrose Loyalty Coalition	Oaklan Davidsen	141	0.61	–
Solidarity Movement	Kent Liang	112	0.49	–
Total valid votes		23,079	98.96	–
Rejected and declined		243	1.04	
Turnout		23,322	70.65	
Eligible electors		33,010		
New Democratic gain from United Conservative		Swing		+10.18
Source(s) Source: Elections Alberta

=== Elections in the 2010s ===
2019 Alberta general election
Party	Candidate	Votes	%	±%
United Conservative	Jason Copping	10,853	46.16	+1.90
New Democratic	Anne McGrath	10,215	43.44	+3.29
Alberta Party	Beth Barberree	1,687	7.17	+6.05
Liberal	Ryan Campbell	383	1.63	-10.48
Green	Cheryle Chagnon-Greyeyes	274	1.17	-1.04
Independence	Chris McAndrew	101	0.43	New
Total valid votes		23,513	99.89	
Rejected, spoiled and declined		264	1.11	
Turnout		23,777	73.34	
Eligible electors		32,422		
United Conservative notional hold		Swing		-0.69
Source(s) "2019 Provincial General Election Results". Elections Alberta.

2015 Alberta general election
Party	Candidate	Votes	%	±%
New Democratic	Stephanie McLean	8,297	43.94	+39.31
Progressive Conservative	Susan Billington	5,700	30.19	-15.71
Wildrose	Sharon Polsky	2,598	13.76	-12.45
Liberal	Pete Helfrich	1,862	9.86	-10.62
Green	Carl Svoboda	424	2.25	+0.92
Total valid votes		18,881	99.33	+0.03
Rejected, spoiled and declined		127	0.67	-0.03
Eligible voters / turnout		32,467	58.55	-1.30
New Democratic gain from Progressive Conservative		Swing		+27.51
Source(s) "2015 Provincial General Election Results". Elections Alberta. Archived from the original on September 28, 2020.

2015 Alberta general election redistributed results
Party	Votes	%
New Democratic	8,322	40.16
Progressive Conservative	6,137	29.61
Wildrose	3,034	14.64
Liberal	2,510	12.11
Green	456	2.20
Alberta Party	233	1.12
Social Credit	32	0.15
Source(s) Source: Ridingbuilder

2012 Alberta general election
Party	Candidate	Votes	%	±%
Progressive Conservative	Donna Kennedy-Glans	8,099	45.90	+9.22
Wildrose	Rob Solinger	4,624	26.21	+19.06
Liberal	Bruce Payne	3,614	20.48	-26.85
New Democratic	Jackie Seidel	817	4.63	+1.00
Alberta Party	Alex McBrien	255	1.45	
Evergreen	Carl Svoboda	234	1.33	-3.87
Total valid votes		17,643	99.30	-0.11
Rejected, spoiled and declined		124	0.70	+0.11
Eligible electors / turnout		29,688	59.85	+15.21
Progressive Conservative gain from Liberal		Swing		+18.04
Source(s) Elections Alberta. "Electoral Division Results: Calgary-Varsity".

=== Elections in the 2000s ===
2008 Alberta general election
Party	Candidate	Votes	%	±%
Liberal	Harry Chase	6,907	47.34	+2.70
Progressive Conservative	Jennifer Diakiw	5,353	36.69	-2.63
Wildrose Alliance	Brennan Lytle	1,043	7.15	+1.77
Greens	Sean Maw	758	5.19	-0.16
New Democratic	Tim Stock-Bateman	530	3.63	-0.85
Total valid votes		14,591	99.41	-0.07
Rejected, spoiled and declined		87	0.59	+0.07
Eligible electors / Turnout		32,883	44.64	-9.67
Liberal hold		Swing		+2.67
Source(s) The Report on the March 3, 2008 Provincial General Election of the Twenty-seventh Legislative Assembly. Elections Alberta. July 28, 2008. pp. 260–263.

2004 Alberta general election
Party	Candidate	Votes	%	±%
Liberal	Harry Chase	6,347	44.64	+16.01
Progressive Conservative	Michael Smyth	5,591	39.32	-20.10
Alberta Alliance	Ronald Beniger	765	5.38	New
Greens	Richard Larson	761	5.35	+2.92
New Democratic	Mark Gabruch	637	4.48	-5.04
Social Credit	Len Skowronski	118	0.83	New
Total valid votes		14,219	99.48	+0.01
Rejected, spoiled and declined		75	0.52	-0.01
Eligible electors / Turnout		26,318	54.31	-5.14
Liberal gain from Progressive Conservative		Swing		+18.06
Source(s) "Calgary-Varsity Statement of Official Results 2004 Alberta general election" (PDF). Elections Alberta.

2001 Alberta general election
Party	Candidate	Votes	%	±%
Progressive Conservative	Murray Smith	8,173	59.42	+8.00
Liberal	Carrol Jaques	3,938	28.63	-9.87
New Democratic	Susan Scott	1,309	9.52	+4.97
Greens	Tavis Du Preez	334	2.43	+1.49
Total valid votes		13,754	99.47	-0.37
Rejected, spoiled and declined		73	0.53	+0.37
Eligible electors / Turnout		23,260	59.45	+0.24
Progressive Conservative hold		Swing		+8.94
Source(s) "Calgary-Varsity Official Results 2001 Alberta general election" (PDF). Elections Alberta.

=== Elections in the 1990s ===
1997 Alberta general election
Party	Candidate	Votes	%	±%
Progressive Conservative	Murray Smith	7,232	51.42	+3.54
Liberal	Carrol Jaques	5,414	38.50	-0.05
Social Credit	Mike Bressers	646	4.59	New
New Democratic	Dirk Huysman	640	4.55	-5.48
Greens	Joel Ashworth	132	0.94	-2.04
Total		14,064	99.84	+0.10
Rejected, spoiled and declined		23	0.16	-0.10
Eligible electors / Turnout		23,792	59.21	-5.53
Progressive Conservative hold		Swing		+1.80
Source(s) "1997 General Election". Elections Alberta. Archived from the original on February 14, 2012.

1993 Alberta general election
Party	Candidate	Votes	%
Progressive Conservative	Murray Smith	8,520	47.88
Liberal	Carrol Jaques	6,860	38.55
New Democratic	Sharon Kimmel	1,785	10.03
Greens	Mike Sawyer	531	2.98
Natural Law	Santo Esposito	99	0.56
Total valid votes		17,795	99.74
Rejected, spoiled and declined		47	0.26
Eligible electors / Turnout		27,560	64.74
Progressive Conservative pickup new district.			
Source(s) "Calgary-Varsity results 1993 Alberta general election". Alberta Heritage Community Foundation. Archived from the original on December 8, 2010.

== Senate nominee election results ==
2004 Senate nominee election results: Calgary-Varsity				Turnout 54.44%	
Affiliation	Votes	% votes	% ballots	Rank	
Progressive Conservative	Bert Brown	5,387	16.92%	49.83%	1
Progressive Conservative	Jim Silye	4,891	15.36%	45.25%	5
Progressive Conservative	Betty Unger	4,072	12.79%	37.67%	2
Independent	Link Byfield	3,812	11.97%	35.26%	4
Independent	Tom Sindlinger	2,920	9.17%	27.01%	9
Progressive Conservative	David Usherwood	2,682	8.42%	24.81%	6
Progressive Conservative	Cliff Breitkreuz	2,536	7.96%	23.46%	3
Alberta Alliance	Vance Gough	2,105	6.61%	19.47%	8
Alberta Alliance	Michael Roth	1,895	5.95%	17.53%	7
Alberta Alliance	Gary Horan	1,547	4.61%	14.31%	10
Total votes		31,847	100%		
Total ballots		10,810	2.95 votes per ballot		
Rejected, spoiled and declined		3,517			

Voters had the option of selecting four candidates on the ballot

== Student vote results ==
Participating schools
Banff Trail School
Brentwood Elementary
Ecole Varsity Acres School
F. E. Osborne Junior High School
H.D. Cartwright Junior High School
Jerry Potts Elementary
Sir William Van Horne High School
William Aberhart High School

On November 19, 2004, a student vote was conducted at participating Alberta schools to parallel the 2004 Alberta general election results. The vote was designed to educate students and simulate the electoral process for persons who have not yet reached the legal majority. The vote was conducted in 80 of the 83 provincial electoral districts with students voting for actual election candidates. Schools with a large student body that reside in another electoral district had the option to vote for candidates outside of the electoral district then where they were physically located.

2004 Alberta student vote results
Affiliation	Candidate	Votes	%
Liberal	Harry Chase	424	30.44%
Progressive Conservative	Michael Smyth	373	26.78%
Green	Richard Larson	282	20.24%
NDP	Mark Gabruch	203	14.57%
Alberta Alliance	Ronald Beniger	60	4.31%
Social Credit	Len Skowronski	51	3.66%
Total		1,393	100%
Rejected, spoiled and declined		95	

== See also ==
- List of Alberta provincial electoral districts
- Canadian provincial electoral districts
