= Harry B. Chase =

Canadian politician

Harry Chase
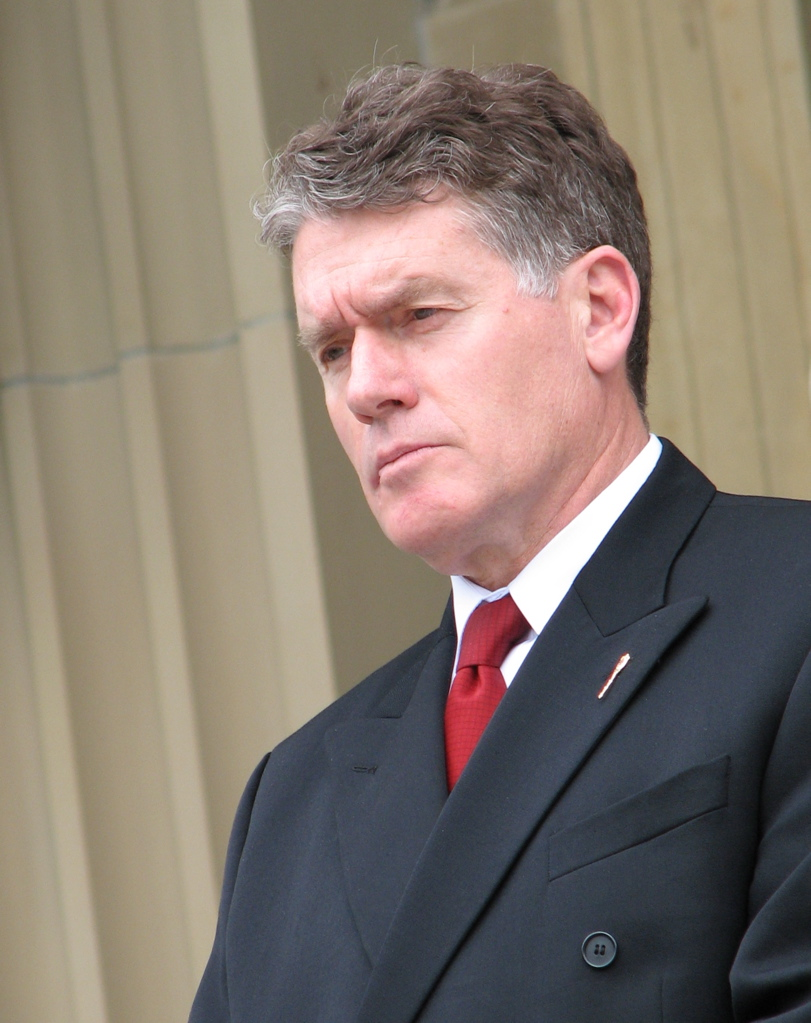
- Chase outside the Alberta legislature, June 11, 2007

Member of the Legislative Assembly of Alberta for Calgary Varsity
- In office November 22, 2004 – April 23, 2012
- Preceded by: Murray Smith
- Succeeded by: Donna Kennedy-Glans

Personal details
- Born: Harry Bryce Chase; November 22, 1947 (age 78) Saskatoon, Saskatchewan
- Party: Alberta Liberal Party
- Profession: Teacher

Harry Bryce Chase (born November 22, 1947) is a Canadian politician. He was a provincial MLA as a member of the Alberta Liberal Party.

== Early life ==
Harry B. Chase was elected to his first term as a Member of the Legislative Assembly of Alberta for the constituency of Calgary-Varsity on November 22, 2004. He was re-elected for a second term on March 3, 2008.

Chase earned his Bachelor of Education from the University of Calgary in 1971. He served as a teacher for 34 years. During that time, Chase served as the Council of Schools’ representative for over 20 years. He later served the Calgary chair of the Friends of Medicare. He was also a member of the Local 38 branch of the Alberta Teachers’ Association (ATA), serving on the economic policy committee/ teacher welfare branch from 1988 to 1998. He was awarded his lifetime membership with the ATA in 2003.

== Political career ==
Chase ran for office in the 2001 Alberta general election. He was defeated in a landslide running in the electoral district of Calgary Foothills by Finance Minister Pat Nelson.

He ran for a second time in the 2004 Alberta general election. He defeated Progressive Conservative candidate Michael Symth in what was considered an upset win. He has since represented the riding of Calgary Varsity, which was previously considered a Progressive Conservative stronghold. In his first term in office he served as the official opposition Infrastructure critic.

Chase ran for a second term in office in the 2008 Alberta general election, he was re-elected holding the electoral district with a comfortable plurality. He did not seek re-election in the 2012 election.
