= Murray Smith (Alberta politician) =

Canadian politician

The Honourable Murray D. Smith ECA

Member of the Legislative Assembly of Alberta
- In office June 15, 1993 – November 22, 2004
- Preceded by: New district
- Succeeded by: Harry Chase
- Constituency: Calgary-Varsity

Personal details
- Party: Progressive Conservative
- Spouse: Barbara Smith
- Occupation: Lawyer, businessman, politician

Murray D. Smith ECA is a businessman and former provincial-level politician from Alberta, Canada. He served as a member of the Legislative Assembly of Alberta from 1993 until 2004 sitting with the governing Progressive Conservative caucus. During his time in office he served as a cabinet minister under the government of Ralph Klein serving various cabinet portfolios from 1994 to 2004.

== Early life ==
Smith took his post secondary education as the University of Calgary where he earned a B.A. (Economics & Political Science). He also attended London Business School's Senior Executive Program and went to Notre Dame College in Wilcox, Saskatchewan.

After university he worked in the Alberta energy sector with a number of Alberta-based energy service companies including drilling fluids, service rigs, oilfield contracting and consulting. In addition to his involvement in the private sector, he was an active community volunteer. Political Career

Smith ran for political office on the provincial level. He ran for a seat to the Alberta Legislature in the electoral district of Calgary-Varsity in the 1993 Alberta general election. He won the new electoral district winning a hotly contested race against Liberal candidate Carrol Jaques and three other candidates to pick up the district for the provincial Progressive Conservatives.

After the election Premier Ralph Klein appointed Smith to the Executive Council of Alberta. He served as the Minister of Economic Development and Tourism. During his tenure of the portfolio he phased out the Machinery and Equipment Tax. This was the largest industrial tax reduction in the province's history. Klein would shuffle his cabinet on May 31, 1996 and Smith became the Minister of Labour.

Smith ran for re-election in the 1997 Alberta general election with ministerial advantage. He faced off against Jaques for the second time and ended up returning to his second term with a larger majority over the other four candidates. Jaques saw her popular vote fall from her 1993 result.

Klein would shuffle his cabinet on May 26, 1999. Smith was given a new portfolio he became the first Minister of Gaming for the province. He ran for a third term in office in the 2001 Alberta general election and faced Jaques for the third time. He defeated three other candidates including Jaques with a landslide majority to win his third term, while Jaques popular vote collapsed.

After the election in 2001 Klein would assign Smith to another portfolio he would become the Minister of Energy on March 16, 2001. Smith was responsible in that portfolio for gaining international recognition of Alberta's 176 billion barrels of established oil reserves—including 174 billion barrels of oil sands. During his tenure, Alberta annual oil and gas royalty revenue rose to over $9 billion, a record number of wells were drilled (over 20,000), and over $60 billion in investment was committed to Alberta oil sands projects.

Smith was also responsible for Alberta's electricity sector, guiding the $5 billion market move to a competitive wholesale generation market. Increased investment added over 5000 megawatts in new generation, and Alberta became the top wind generation province in Canada. He retired from provincial politics at dissolution of the legislature in 2004.

== Washington appointment ==
After leaving provincial politics Smith was appointed in January 2005 as the Official Representative of the Province of Alberta to the United States of America. He led the Alberta Office in Washington, DC, until returning to Canada in the fall of 2007. Smith is a member of the Board at Williams(WMB.nyse) He is also a member of the board at N-Solv, a private company with Hatch as the majority shareholder. N-Solv is a in situ oilsands technology company that produces oil with 85% reduction in GHG emissions and uses no water

As Alberta's representative in Washington DC, Smith was a Congressional Nominee for Securing America's Future Energy, a Presidential Commission, (The Energy Policy Act of 2005). Smith also built a partnership with the Smithsonian Institution that featured Alberta on the National Mall in Washington DC in 2006, as part of the Smithsonian Folklife Festival that attracted over a million visitors and garnered national media attention. During his tenure in Washington DC, Smith testified in Senate and Congressional Committees on Energy, was a frequent commentator and source for energy analysis for US print and electronic media. Smith is also a frequent presenter and speaker to investor organizations, conferences and numerous seminars.

== Late life ==
Smith is a current member of Energy Advisory Board of TD Securities Inc. He serves on various energy-related corporate boards, and is president of a private consulting company, Murray Smith and Associates.

Smith has been the recipient of numerous awards, including being named as one of the top 40 alumni in the past 40 years at the University of Calgary (where an endowment exists in his name). In 2006 Smith was recognized as one of Alberta Venture newsmagazine's 50 most influential Albertans. Smith was also recently recognized for his work with the First Nations of Alberta and made an honorary chief and given the name “Seven War Bonnets Man”. Smith is a contributor to many community organizations and is a past Director of the Calgary Stampede Board.

Smith is married to Barbara Smith and has two daughters. He is a golfer and a lifetime member of the Riley Park Cricket Club.
