= Esquimalt—Saanich—Sooke =

Federal electoral district in British Columbia, Canada

British Columbia electoral district
- Interactive map of riding boundaries from the 2025 federal election

Federal electoral district
- Legislature: House of Commons
MP
Stephanie McLean
Liberal
- District created: 2013
- First contested: 2015
- Last contested: 2025
- District webpage: profile, map

Demographics
- Population (2011): 113,004
- Electors (2019): 99,285
- Area (km²): 404
- Pop. density (per km²): 279.7
- Census division: Capital
- Census subdivision(s): Saanich (part), Colwood, Esquimalt, Sooke, View Royal, Metchosin, New Songhees, T'Sou-ke, Becher Bay, Esquimalt

Esquimalt—Saanich—Sooke is a federal electoral district in Greater Victoria, located on the southern tip of Vancouver Island in British Columbia, Canada.

It was created by the 2012 federal electoral boundaries redistribution, the district came into effect in 2013, and first contested in the general election on Monday October 19th, 2015. Esquimalt—Saanich—Sooke encompasses portions of the south Island that were previously included in the electoral districts of Esquimalt—Juan de Fuca and Saanich—Gulf Islands. The riding contains the Township of Esquimalt, the City of Colwood, the District of Metchosin, View Royal, Sooke, as well as the North Quadra, Swan Lake and Cloverdale neighbourhoods in Saanich East along with all of Saanich West. The population of the district was 113,004 in 2011.

The district was originally planned to be named "Saanich—Esquimalt—Juan de Fuca".

The riding was redrawn in accordance to the 2023 representation order.

== Demographics ==
Panethnic groups in Esquimalt—Saanich—Sooke (2011−2021)
Panethnic group	2021		2016		2011	
Panethnic group	Pop.	%	Pop.	%	Pop.	%
European (Note: Statistic includes all persons that did not make up part of a visible minority or an indigenous identity.)	99,360	78.75%	96,370	81.57%	95,230	85.4%
Indigenous	7,255	5.75%	6,655	5.63%	5,270	4.73%
East Asian (Note: Statistic includes total responses of "Chinese", "Korean", and "Japanese" under visible minority section on census.)	5,645	4.47%	4,820	4.08%	3,440	3.08%
South Asian	4,640	3.68%	3,665	3.1%	2,890	2.59%
Southeast Asian (Note: Statistic includes total responses of "Filipino" and "Southeast Asian" under visible minority section on census.)	4,365	3.46%	3,340	2.83%	2,375	2.13%
African	1,735	1.38%	1,300	1.1%	1,110	1%
Latin American	1,160	0.92%	785	0.66%	595	0.53%
Middle Eastern (Note: Statistic includes total responses of "West Asian" and "Arab" under visible minority section on census.)	970	0.77%	590	0.5%	210	0.19%
Other (Note: Statistic includes total responses of "Visible minority, n.i.e." and "Multiple visible minorities" under visible minority section on census.)	1,035	0.82%	615	0.52%	395	0.35%
Total responses	126,165	98.07%	118,150	97.78%	111,510	98.71%
Total population	128,644	100%	120,834	100%	112,969	100%
Notes: Totals greater than 100% due to multiple origin responses. Demographics based on 2012 Canadian federal electoral redistribution riding boundaries.

According to the 2016 Canadian census

Languages: 86.2% English, 2.4% French, 1.5% Punjabi, 1.1% German, 1.0% Cantonese, 1.0% Tagalog
Religions (2011): 43.0% Christian (13.7% Catholic, 7.9% Anglican, 5.6% United Church, 2.6% Baptist, 1.3% Lutheran, 1.3% Pentecostal, 1.2% Presbyterian, 9.4% Other), 1.4% Sikh, 52.6% No religion
Median income (2015): $37,275
Average income (2015): $45,081

== Members of Parliament ==
This riding has elected the following members of the House of Commons of Canada:

Parliament	Years	Member	Party
Esquimalt—Saanich—Sooke; Riding created from Esquimalt—Juan de Fuca and Saanich—Gulf Islands
42nd	2015–2019	Randall Garrison	New Democratic
43rd	2019–2021	Randall Garrison	New Democratic
44th	2021–2025	Randall Garrison	New Democratic
45th	2025–present	Stephanie McLean	Liberal

== Election results ==
View source data.
Graph of election results in Esquimalt—Saanich—Sooke (minor parties that never got 2% of the vote or didn't run consistently are omitted)

=== 2023 representation order ===
2025 Canadian federal election
Party	Candidate	Votes	%	±%	Expenditures
Liberal	Stephanie McLean	36,181	49.34	+27.46	$116,092.08
Conservative	Grant Cool	21,082	28.75	+7.78	$101,432.32
New Democratic	Maja Tait	13,666	18.64	–24.60	$78,201.75
Green	Ben Homer-Dixon	1,959	2.67	–6.22	$17,629.61
Christian Heritage	David Schaafsma	159	0.22	–	$3,519.03
Independent	Param Bhatti	152	0.21	–	$181.44
Communist	Robert Crooks	136	0.19	–0.19	none listed
Total valid votes/expense limit		73,335	99.47	–	$143,722.25
Total rejected ballots		391	0.53	–0.32	
Turnout		73,726	74.18	+10.08	
Eligible voters		99,386			
Liberal notional gain from New Democratic		Swing		+26.03	
Source: Elections Canada

2021 federal election redistributed results
Party	Vote	%
New Democratic	26,306	43.23
Liberal	13,314	21.88
Conservative	12,759	20.97
Green	5,410	8.89
People's	2,828	4.65
Others	234	0.38

=== 2013 representation order ===
2021 Canadian federal election
Party	Candidate	Votes	%	±%	Expenditures
New Democratic	Randall Garrison	28,056	42.81	+8.74	$90,837.23
Liberal	Doug Kobayashi	14,466	22.07	+4.17	$64,494.79
Conservative	Laura Anne Frost	13,885	21.18	+2.06	$40,019.46
Green	Harley Gordon	5,891	8.99	–17.40	$44,246.24
People's	Rob Anderson	2,995	4.57	+3.02	$2,605.00
Communist	Tyson Riel Strandlund	249	0.38	+0.22	none listed
Total valid votes/expense limit		65,542	99.15	–	$128,919.72
Total rejected ballots		565	0.85	+0.42	
Turnout		66,107	64.10	–6.16	
Eligible voters		103,129			
New Democratic hold		Swing		+6.46	
Source: Elections Canada

2019 Canadian federal election
Party	Candidate	Votes	%	±%	Expenditures
New Democratic	Randall Garrison	23,887	34.06	–0.95	$91,278.46
Green	David Merner	18,506	26.39	+6.45	$82,588.37
Conservative	Randall Pewarchuk	13,409	19.12	+1.62	$55,407.54
Liberal	Jamie Hammond	12,554	17.90	–9.45	$69,892.94
People's	Jeremy Gustafson	1,089	1.55	–	$5,720.80
Libertarian	Josh Steffler	287	0.41	–	none listed
Communist	Tyson Strandlund	111	0.16	–0.04	$476.56
Independent	Louis James Lesosky	100	0.14	–	none listed
Independent	Fidelia Godron	99	0.14	–	none listed
Independent	Philip G. Ney	83	0.12	–	none listed
Total valid votes/expense limit		70,125	99.57	–	$122,646.26
Total rejected ballots		304	0.43	+0.14	
Turnout		70,429	70.26	–4.73	
Eligible voters		100,238			
New Democratic hold		Swing		–	
Source: Elections Canada

2015 Canadian federal election
Party	Candidate	Votes	%	±%	Expenditures
New Democratic	Randall Garrison	23,836	35.01	–4.39	$119,644.07
Liberal	David Merner	18,622	27.35	+17.65	$45,814.93
Green	Frances Litman	13,575	19.94	+7.08	$90,432.82
Conservative	Shari Lukens	11,912	17.50	–20.11	$108,944.43
Communist	Tyson Strandlund	136	0.20	–	none listed
Total valid votes/expense limit		68,081	99.71	–	$229,301.98
Total rejected ballots		199	0.29	–	
Turnout		68,280	74.99	–	
Eligible voters		91,056			
New Democratic notional hold		Swing		–11.02	
Source: Elections Canada

2011 federal election redistributed results
Party	Vote	%
New Democratic	22,324	39.40
Conservative	21,305	37.61
Green	7,287	12.86
Liberal	5,496	9.70
Others	242	0.43

== See also ==
- List of Canadian electoral districts
- Historical federal electoral districts of Canada
