= Convoy Place, Nova Scotia =

Neighbourhood in Halifax, Nova Scotia

Coordinates: 44°39′54.3″N 63°37′0.6″W

Convoy Place is a residential neighbourhood in Halifax on the Halifax Peninsula within the Halifax Regional Municipality of Nova Scotia.
