= Oyster Bed Bridge =

- Unincorporated Rural Area
- Location within Prince Edward Island
- Coordinates: 46.388345°N 63.237005°W
- Country: Canada
- Province: Prince Edward Island
- County: Queens County
- Parish: Greensville
- Lot: Lot 24
- Time zone: Atlantic (AST)
- Canadian Postal code: C0A 1N0
- Area code: 902
- NTS Map: 011L06
- GNBC Code: BABZD

Oyster Bed Bridge is an unincorporated rural community in the township of Lot 24, Queens County, Prince Edward Island, Canada.

Oyster Bed Bridge is located at the intersections of Route 6 and Route 7, 12 kilometres (7 mi) south of North Rustico and 20 kilometres (12 mi) north of Charlottetown in the central part of the province on the north shore.
