= Esquimalt—Juan de Fuca =

Former federal electoral district in British Columbia, Canada

Coordinates: 48.50°N 123.94°W

British Columbia electoral district
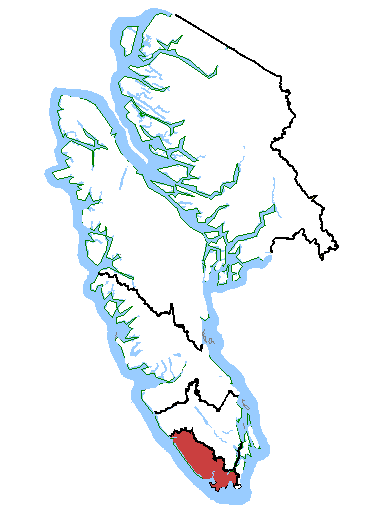
- Esquimalt—Juan de Fuca in relation to other Vancouver Island federal electoral districts

Federal electoral district
- Legislature: House of Commons
- District created: 1987
- District abolished: 2013
- First contested: 1988
- Last contested: 2011
- District webpage: profile, map

Demographics
- Population (2011): 132,300
- Electors (2011): 91,003
- Area (km²): 1,796.18
- Census division: Capital
- Census subdivision(s): Saanich, Langford, Esquimalt, Colwood, Sooke, View Royal, Metchosin, Capital H (Part 1)

Esquimalt—Juan de Fuca is a former federal electoral district in the province of British Columbia, Canada, which was represented in the House of Commons of Canada from 1988 to 2015

== Demographics ==
Population, 2006	120,669
Electors	87,456
Area (km^{2})	1,862
Population density (people per km^{2})	64.80

== Geography ==
It initially consisted of:

- the Esquimalt District Municipality and the City of Colwood;
- Electoral Area D of the Capital Regional District, the southwest part of Electoral Area B, the southwest part of Electoral Area E'
- the southwest part of Saanich District Municipality,
- the southeast part of Cowichan Valley Regional District, and
- Metchosin District Municipality.

== History ==
The riding was created in 1988 from Esquimalt—Saanich and Cowichan—Malahat—The Islands ridings.

=== Members of Parliament ===
This riding has elected the following members of Parliament:

Parliament	Years	Member	Party
Riding created from Esquimalt—Saanich and Cowichan—Malahat—The Islands
34th	1988–1993	Dave Barrett	New Democratic
35th	1993–1997	Keith Martin	Reform
36th	1997–2000	Keith Martin	Reform
36th	2000–2000	Keith Martin	Alliance
37th	2000–2003	Keith Martin	Alliance
37th	2003–2004	Keith Martin	Independent
38th	2004–2006	Keith Martin	Liberal
39th	2006–2008	Keith Martin	Liberal
40th	2008–2011	Keith Martin	Liberal
41st	2011–2015	Randall Garrison	New Democratic
Riding dissolved into Esquimalt—Saanich—Sooke and Cowichan—Malahat—Langford

== Election results ==
=== 2011 ===
2011 Canadian federal election
Party	Candidate	Votes	%	±%	Expenditures
New Democratic	Randall Garrison	26,198	40.87	+18.15	$61,291.60
Conservative	Troy DeSouza	25,792	40.24	+6.17	$96,496.90
Liberal	Lillian Szpak	6,439	10.05	–24.14	$47,126.99
Green	Shaunna Salsman	5,341	8.33	+0.05	$462.02
Independent	Louis James Lesosky	181	0.28	–	none listed
Canadian Action	Christopher Porter	145	0.23	+0.00	none listed
Total valid votes/expense limit		64,096	99.76	–	$98,933.86
Total rejected ballots		152	0.24	+0.02	
Turnout		64,248	65.24	+0.67	
Eligible voters		98,477			
New Democratic gain from Liberal		Swing		+5.99	
Source: Elections Canada

=== 2008 ===
2008 Canadian federal election
Party	Candidate	Votes	%	±%	Expenditures
Liberal	Keith Martin	20,042	34.18	–0.75	$68,186.12
Conservative	Troy DeSouza	19,974	34.07	+6.59	$89,363.98
New Democratic	Jennifer Burgis	13,322	22.72	–8.57	$54,964.99
Green	Brian G. Gordon	4,854	8.28	+2.58	$19,490.93
Independent	Philip G. Ney	309	0.53	–	$2,282.76
Canadian Action	Brad Rhodes	130	0.22	+0.07	$773.86
Total valid votes/expense limit		58,631	99.78	–	$91,768.05
Total rejected ballots		129	0.22	+0.03	
Turnout		58,760	64.57	–3.51	
Eligible voters		91,003			
Liberal hold		Swing		–3.68	
Source: Elections Canada

=== 2006 ===
2006 Canadian federal election
Party	Candidate	Votes	%	±%	Expenditures
Liberal	Keith Martin	20,761	34.93	–0.36	$77,288.02
New Democratic	Randall Garrison	18,595	31.29	+0.67	$74,284.67
Conservative	Troy DeSouza	16,327	27.47	+3.31	$76,237.04
Green	Mike Robinson	3,385	5.70	–3.55	$1,911.22
Western Block	Doug Christie	272	0.46	–	$97.73
Canadian Action	David Piney	89	0.15	–0.11	$3,523.26
Total valid votes/expense limit		59,429	99.81	–	$84,072.71
Total rejected ballots		112	0.19	–0.07	
Turnout		59,541	68.08	+2.15	
Eligible voters		87,456			
Liberal hold		Swing		–0.52	
Source: Elections Canada

=== 2004 ===
2004 Canadian federal election
Party	Candidate	Votes	%	±%	Expenditures
Liberal	Keith Martin	19,389	35.30	+11.37	$70,953.15
New Democratic	Randall Garrison	16,821	30.62	+17.21	$36,007.10
Conservative	John Koury	13,271	24.16	–33.57	$62,004.61
Green	Jane Sterk	5,078	9.24	+4.98	$20,392.02
Independent	Jen Fisher-Bradley	229	0.42	–	$5,424.80
Canadian Action	Shawn W. Giles	141	0.26	–	none listed
Total valid votes/expense limit		54,929	99.74	–	$79,941.95
Total rejected ballots		144	0.26	–0.06	
Turnout		55,073	65.93	+4.44	
Eligible voters		83,527			
Liberal gain from Independent		Swing		–2.92	
Change for the Conservatives is based on the combined totals of the Canadian Alliance and the Progressive Conservatives. Liberal candidate Keith Martin lost 14.44 percentage points from his 2000 performance running as a Canadian Alliance candidate.
Source: Elections Canada

=== 2000 ===
2000 Canadian federal election
Party	Candidate	Votes	%	±%	Expenditures
Alliance	Keith Martin	23,982	49.73	+6.30	$55,783
Liberal	Alan Thompson	11,536	23.92	–2.25	$42,770
New Democratic	Carol E. Harris	6,468	13.41	–8.76	$17,154
Progressive Conservative	John Vukovic	3,857	8.00	+3.51	$7,015
Green	Casey Brennan	2,056	4.26	+1.75	$129
Natural Law	Paul E. Tessier	324	0.67	+0.01	none listed
Total valid votes		48,223	99.68		
Total rejected ballots		157	0.32	+0.01	
Turnout		48,380	61.50	–3.49	
Eligible voters		78,669			
Reform hold		Swing		+4.28	
Change for the Canadian Alliance is based on the Reform Party.
Source: Elections Canada

=== 1997 ===
1997 Canadian federal election
Party	Candidate	Votes	%	±%	Expenditures
Reform	Keith Martin	20,370	43.43	+8.14	$61,464
Liberal	John Bergbusch	12,278	26.18	+4.66	$51,318
New Democratic	Chris Main	10,400	22.17	–5.02	$55,916
Progressive Conservative	Terry Prentice	2,104	4.49	–5.40	$4,987
Green	Robert Moore-Stewart	1,181	2.52	–	$979
Natural Law	Sylvia Danyluk	311	0.66	–0.26	$321
Canadian Action	Dan W. Whetung	261	0.56	–4.22	$3,206
Total valid votes		46,905	99.68		
Total rejected ballots		150	0.32	–0.04	
Turnout		47,055	64.98	–0.83	
Eligible voters		72,411			
Reform hold		Swing		+1.74	
Source: Elections Canada

=== 1993 ===
1993 Canadian federal election
Party	Candidate	Votes	%	±%
Reform	Keith Martin	16,352	35.29	+24.86
New Democratic	Dave Barrett	12,600	27.19	–23.73
Liberal	Ross McKinnon	9,970	21.52	+9.52
Progressive Conservative	Grace Holman	4,582	9.89	–15.21
National	Dan W. Whetung	2,214	4.78	–
Natural Law	Don McCarthy	426	0.92	–
Independent	Louis James Lesosky	98	0.21	–0.09
Canada Party	Alisen Oliver	97	0.21	–
Total valid votes		46,339	99.64	
Total rejected ballots		167	0.36	+0.15
Turnout		46,506	65.81	–10.78
Eligible voters		70,662		
Reform gain from New Democratic		Swing		+24.30
Source: Elections Canada

=== 1988 ===
1988 Canadian federal election
Party	Candidate	Votes	%
New Democratic	Dave Barrett	22,644	50.92
Progressive Conservative	Owen Lippert	11,162	25.10
Liberal	William J. McElroy	5,332	11.99
Reform	William Kronkhite	4,637	10.43
Green	Beverley A. Holden	444	1.00
Independent	Louis James Lesosky	132	0.30
Independent	Richard Lewers	84	0.19
Confederation of Regions	Donald L. Porter	34	0.08
Total valid votes		44,469	99.79
Total rejected ballots		93	0.21
Turnout		44,562	76.60
Eligible voters		58,176	
This riding was created from parts of Esquimalt—Saanich and Cowichan—Malahat—The Islands, which elected a Progressive Conservative and a New Democrat, respectively, in the last election.
Source: Elections Canada

== See also ==
- List of Canadian electoral districts
- Historical federal electoral districts of Canada
