= Randall Garrison =

Canadian politician

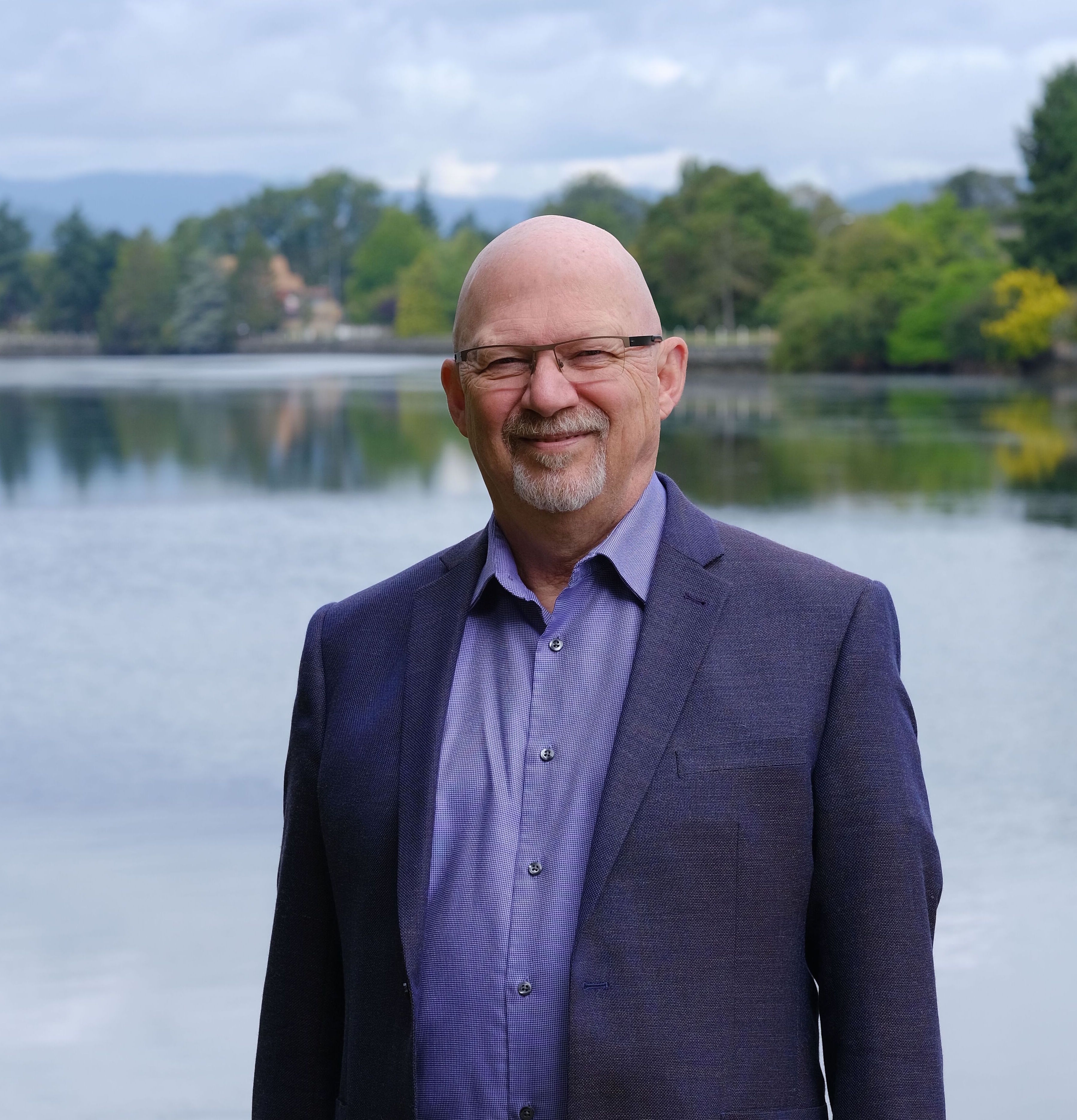
- Garrison in 2019

Member of Parliament for Esquimalt—Saanich—Sooke Esquimalt—Juan de Fuca (2011–2015)
- In office May 2, 2011 – January 30, 2025
- Preceded by: Keith Martin
- Succeeded by: Stephanie McLean

Personal details
- Born: August 27, 1950 (age 76) Lincoln, Nebraska, U.S.
- Party: New Democratic
- Spouse: Teddy Pardede
- Occupation: Criminologist, college instructor

Randall C. Garrison (born August 27, 1950) is a Canadian politician. Elected to the House of Commons in the 2011 federal election, he represented the electoral district of Esquimalt—Saanich—Sooke until 2025 as a member of the New Democratic Party. He served as the party's critic for justice, 2SLGBTQIA+ rights and deputy critic for National Defence.

As a member of Parliament, he was known for his work in successfully banning conversion therapy in Canada, adding transgender, gender identity & gender expression to both the Canadian Human Rights Code and hate crimes section of the criminal code, eliminating criminal records for simple possession of drugs, and ending the ban on gay & bisexual men from donating blood. A former criminology and political science instructor at Camosun College, Garrison is openly gay and married to Teddy Pardede.

Garrison has served on the boards of several non-profit organizations as well as the Esquimalt Police Board. He is also an international human rights activist. He has worked as a policing researcher in Afghanistan with Amnesty International, on a Christian-Muslim peace building project in Indonesia for the International Catholic Migration Commission, and as co-coordinator of IFET, an international non-government human rights observer mission for the East Timor independence referendum in 1999. In May 2010, Garrison served as an international observer with the People's International Observers Mission (PIOM) in the Autonomous Region of Muslim Mindanao for the national elections in the Philippines.

== Early life and career ==
Born in Nebraska, Randall Garrison eventually moved to Canada in 1973. He spent two years living in Yellowknife, working for the government recording vital statistics. He moved to British Columbia (BC) where, at the age of 26, Garrison graduated from the University of British Columbia with a master's degree in political science. He moved to Victoria where he worked within the BC provincial government as a public policy researcher and director. By the 1990s, and until he was elected as a member of Parliament, he taught at Camosun College, in criminal justice, political science, and Pacific Rim studies. In 1990, as a member of the Victoria Civic Electors, Garrison ran for Victoria City Council but did not win a seat. At the time, he was president of the Vic West Community Association and executive director of the South Pacific People's Foundation of Canada. In 1999, Garrison helped coordinate the International Federation for East Timor who acted as neutral election observer during the East Timorese independence referendum. Garrison's other work overseas included peace-building between religious groups in Indonesia and investigating human rights issues in Afghanistan. Back in Canada, Garrison became a member of the Victoria and Esquimalt police board. During this time, Garrison also helped co-found the Victoria Immigrant and Refugee Centre.

== Political career ==
=== Early electoral history ===
In the 2004 federal election, the 53-year-old Garrison became the New Democratic Party candidate in the Esquimalt—Juan de Fuca riding. The election was seen as a three-way race between Garrison, the Liberal Party incumbent Keith Martin and Conservative Party candidate and former Martin aide John Koury. Garrison placed second, 4.6% behind Martin who was re-elected to a fourth term. A year-and-a-half later, with another federal election expected soon, Garrison was acclaimed the NDP candidate, and again faced Martin, but this time the Conservative challenger was lawyer Troy DeSouza. This January 2006 election was again considered a toss-up and as a result CBC Radio One's Cross Country Checkup broadcast a show highlighting the riding and the candidates. However, Garrison again lost to Martin, this time by 3.6%. Subsequently, Garrison and his partner moved to Vancouver's West End where, in January 2007, he was acclaimed the NDP candidate in the Vancouver Centre riding for an expected election. The next election did not occur until October 2008 and by that time Garrison had moved back to Esquimalt and withdrew from the Vancouver Centre election.

Instead, Garrison stood in the November 2008 local government election where he won a seat on the Esquimalt municipal council. On local issues Garrison was critical of police budget request increases of 10% in 2009 and 5% in 2010 and argued that Esquimalt's merger of its police force with the Victoria Police Department was not producing the benefits that were promised and costing the municipality more than it should. The council adopted a resolution, proposed by Garrison to fund the full budget requests of the police minus one dollar. Garrison advocated for stricter targets of greenhouse gas emissions reduction, and passed a motion supporting a permanent ban on coastal drilling and tanker traffic in BC waters. Garrison lobbied to get the municipality to adopt a living wage policy. At the time a living wage in Greater Victoria was calculated to be $17.31 per hour for a full-time worker. The council adopted the proposal in principle, but ultimately approved a policy that only applied to limit situations.

In January 2011, Garrison was again acclaimed as the NDP candidate in the Esquimalt—Juan de Fuca riding. With Liberal MP Keith Martin no longer seeking re-election, the riding was seen as a potential win for the party. The election came in the spring 2011 and other candidates included home-maker Shaunna Salsman for the Green Party, Canadian Action Party leader Christopher Porter and independent Louis Lesosky, as well as Langford councillor Lillian Szpak for the Liberal Party. Garrison campaigned on supporting development of light rail and universal child care. He was endorsed by the Conservation Voters of British Columbia. The Conservative Party candidate, Troy DeSouza, was supported by party leader and Prime Minister, Stephen Harper, who visited the riding early in the election campaign. Garrison won the riding over DeSouza by 0.6%, due to rising NDP support nationwide and significant votes from Saanich and Esquimalt, thereby joining the official opposition caucus, with the Conservative Party having won a majority government.

=== 41st Parliament ===
As the 41st Parliament opened, Garrison was appointed to the Standing Committee on Public Safety and National Security and party leader Jack Layton appointed Garrison as the NDP critic on LGBT issues. During the 2012 New Democratic Party leadership election, following the death of Jack Layton, Garrison supported Peggy Nash, saying she "embodies the NDP values of social justice, environmental sustainability and prosperity for all". Following Nash's defeat on the second ballot of the contest, he supported Thomas Mulcair, the eventual winner. Mulcair added public safety to Garrison's critic duties.

Following the election, fellow British Columbian NDP MP Jean Crowder was appointed his political mentor. While Garrison and Crowder shared an office in Ottawa, Garrison opened his constituency office in View Royal. Locally, Garrison joined with fellow NDP MP Denise Savoie, provincial Member of the Legislative Assembly Rob Fleming, and local councillors, and the Greater Victoria Chamber of Commerce to advocate for federal and provincial funds to develop a light rail transportation system from Victoria to Langford, a system which had already had commitment from Victoria Regional Transit Commission, the Capital Regional District and the BC Transit. Garrison also successfully fought the attempted deportation of a constituent through a public campaign to the Minister of Citizenship and Immigration Jason Kenney.

As the NDP's LGBT critic, Garrison introduced a piece of legislation, An Act to amend the Canadian Human Rights Act and the Criminal Code (gender identity and gender expression) (Bill C-279) which include gender identity and gender expression among the characteristics protected from discrimination and eligible to be considered in sentencing crimes motivated by hate. Similar legislation had been introduced by Bill Siksay in the 38th, 39th and 40th Parliaments. The bill was amended by the House of Commons to remove the term 'gender expression' and sent to the Senate where it died on the order paper. He also spoke at a remembrance ceremony for a teenager who had committed suicide due to bullying concerning his sexual orientation. After Conservative Party MPs made an 'It Gets Better' video in response to the bullied teenager, a video which received independent criticism regarding its hypocrisy (the MPs had previously voted against same-sex marriage legislation) Garrison explained that, while well-intentioned, they were just repeating a slogan and did not understand the concept.

Garrison introduced Bill C-509, "An Act to amend the Navigable Waters Protection Act (Goldstream River)" in October 2013. The legislation aims to return federal oversight to the "ecological and culturally significant river". Garrison also introduced a motion (M-460) to implement an action plan via the federal government to save the remaining Southern resident killer whales.

=== 42nd Parliament ===
Garrison stood for re-election in the 2015 election. Challenging him in the Esquimalt—Saanich—Sooke riding was government lawyer David Merner for the Liberal Party, Colwood councillor Shari Lukens for the Conservative Party, small-business owner Frances Litman for the Green Party, and student Tyson Strandlund for the Communist Party. Garrison held the riding for the NDP but the party fell to third party status for the 42nd Parliament.

Party leader Thomas Mulcair appointed Garrison to be the critic for national defence and LGBT issues. After Mulcair's resignation as leader, Garrison endorsed Jagmeet Singh in the NDP leadership election. Following Singh's victory, he kept Garrison critic role the same. In December 2015, Garrison again introduced the private member bill An Act to amend the Canadian Human Rights Act and the Criminal Code (gender identity and gender expression) (Bill C-204). While Bill C-204 did not advance beyond that, its contents were finally adopted in the Minister of Justice's Bill C-16.

=== 43rd Parliament ===
As the 43rd Parliament opened, Garrison was appointed by NDP Leader Jagmeet Singh to the Canadian House of Commons Standing Committee on Justice and Human Rights as the NDP Justice Critic, and reappointed as the NDP Critic for National Defence and NDP Critic for 2SLGBTQIA+ Rights.

Garrison introduced Bill C-247, an Act to amend the Criminal Code (controlling or coercive conduct)., criminalizing controlling and coercive behavior in intimate-partner relationships. During its introduction, rates of domestic violence had spiked in Canada as a result of the Shadow Pandemic. Coercive and controlling behavior in intimate partner relationships are primary precursors to domestic violence, and this bill would allow police to intervene earlier in these cases of domestic abuse. After the bill became stalled in the order of introduction of Private Member's Bills Canadian House of Commons, Garrison moved a motion at the Canadian House of Commons Standing Committee on Justice and Human Rights to study the bill. After conducting their study, the Canadian House of Commons Standing Committee on Justice and Human Rights submitted a unanimous report on the text of the bill to the Canadian House of Commons recommending the bill's adoption.

Garrison introduced Bill C-203, An Act to amend the National Defence Act (maiming or injuring self or another). This was Garrison's 3rd attempt to remove self-harm as a disciplinary offense from the Canadian Military Code of Conduct, a key factor preventing active Canadian Armed Forces Members from accessing mental health services and supports.

Garrison introduced Bill C-226, An Act to amend the Employment Equity Act. This bill would have added members of the lesbian, gay, bisexual, transgender, queer and two-spirit communities to the Employment Equity Act, requiring the government to keep track of and set targets for the representation of these groups within the federal public service.

=== 44th Parliament ===
After being re-elected to his fourth consecutive term, Garrison was appointed by NDP Leader Jagmeet Singh to the Canadian House of Commons Standing Committee on Justice and Human Rights as the NDP justice critic, NDP deputy critic for national defence and NDP critic for 2SLGBTQIA+ rights. During this Parliament, Garrison played a critical part in the debate and passage of Bill C-4, which banned the practice of conversion therapy in Canada.

During the passage of Bill C-5, An Act to amend the Criminal Code and the Controlled Drugs and Substances Act, Garrison successfully added a requirement for the government to sequester criminal records for simple possession after 2 years. This sequestration would effectively eliminate criminal records for these offences, avoiding the onerous process of applying for pardons related to these offences.

Garrison reintroduced the text of his previous bill, C-247, An Act to amend the Criminal Code (controlling or coercive conduct), as Bill C-202 in the new parliament. Despite the bill receiving a unanimous recommendation from the Canadian House of Commons Standing Committee on Justice and Human Rights in the 43d Parliament, as a private member's bill low on the order of introduction, it was unlikely to be voted on in the 44th Parliament. To address this, MP Laurel Collins adopted much of the text of the bill in Bill C-332, which eventually passed through the House of Commons.

Garrison also reintroduced the text of his previous bill, C-203, An Act to amend the National Defence Act (maiming or injuring self or another), as C-206 in the new Parliament.

On April 27, 2023, Garrison announced he would not seek re-election. On December 4, 2024, Garrison announced he would resign from Parliament, effective January, due to health reasons.

== Electoral record ==
2021 Canadian federal election: Esquimalt—Saanich—Sooke
Party	Candidate	Votes	%	±%	Expenditures
New Democratic	Randall Garrison	28,056	42.81	+8.74	$90,837.23
Liberal	Doug Kobayashi	14,466	22.07	+4.17	$64,494.79
Conservative	Laura Anne Frost	13,885	21.18	+2.06	$40,019.46
Green	Harley Gordon	5,891	8.99	–17.40	$44,246.24
People's	Rob Anderson	2,995	4.57	+3.02	$2,605.00
Communist	Tyson Riel Strandlund	249	0.38	+0.22	none listed
Total valid votes/expense limit		65,542	99.15	–	$128,919.72
Total rejected ballots		565	0.85	+0.42	
Turnout		66,107	64.10	–6.16	
Eligible voters		103,129			
New Democratic hold		Swing		+6.46	
Source: Elections Canada

2019 Canadian federal election: Esquimalt—Saanich—Sooke
Party	Candidate	Votes	%	±%	Expenditures
New Democratic	Randall Garrison	23,887	34.06	–0.95	$91,278.46
Green	David Merner	18,506	26.39	+6.45	$82,588.37
Conservative	Randall Pewarchuk	13,409	19.12	+1.62	$55,407.54
Liberal	Jamie Hammond	12,554	17.90	–9.45	$69,892.94
People's	Jeremy Gustafson	1,089	1.55	–	$5,720.80
Libertarian	Josh Steffler	287	0.41	–	none listed
Communist	Tyson Strandlund	111	0.16	–0.04	$476.56
Independent	Louis James Lesosky	100	0.14	–	none listed
Independent	Fidelia Godron	99	0.14	–	none listed
Independent	Philip G. Ney	83	0.12	–	none listed
Total valid votes/expense limit		70,125	99.57	–	$122,646.26
Total rejected ballots		304	0.43	+0.14	
Turnout		70,429	70.26	–4.73	
Eligible voters		100,238			
New Democratic hold		Swing		–	
Source: Elections Canada

2015 Canadian federal election: Esquimalt—Saanich—Sooke
Party	Candidate	Votes	%	±%	Expenditures
New Democratic	Randall Garrison	23,836	35.01	–4.39	$119,644.07
Liberal	David Merner	18,622	27.35	+17.65	$45,814.93
Green	Frances Litman	13,575	19.94	+7.08	$90,432.82
Conservative	Shari Lukens	11,912	17.50	–20.11	$108,944.43
Communist	Tyson Strandlund	136	0.20	–	none listed
Total valid votes/expense limit		68,081	99.71	–	$229,301.98
Total rejected ballots		199	0.29	–	
Turnout		68,280	74.99	–	
Eligible voters		91,056			
New Democratic notional hold		Swing		–11.02	
Source: Elections Canada

2011 Canadian federal election: Esquimalt—Juan de Fuca
Party	Candidate	Votes	%	±%	Expenditures
New Democratic	Randall Garrison	26,198	40.87	+18.15	$61,291.60
Conservative	Troy DeSouza	25,792	40.24	+6.17	$96,496.90
Liberal	Lillian Szpak	6,439	10.05	–24.14	$47,126.99
Green	Shaunna Salsman	5,341	8.33	+0.05	$462.02
Independent	Louis James Lesosky	181	0.28	–	none listed
Canadian Action	Christopher Porter	145	0.23	+0.00	none listed
Total valid votes/expense limit		64,096	99.76	–	$98,933.86
Total rejected ballots		152	0.24	+0.02	
Turnout		64,248	65.24	+0.67	
Eligible voters		98,477			
New Democratic gain from Liberal		Swing		+5.99	
Source: Elections Canada

2006 Canadian federal election: Esquimalt—Juan de Fuca
Party	Candidate	Votes	%	±%	Expenditures
Liberal	Keith Martin	20,761	34.93	–0.36	$77,288.02
New Democratic	Randall Garrison	18,595	31.29	+0.67	$74,284.67
Conservative	Troy DeSouza	16,327	27.47	+3.31	$76,237.04
Green	Mike Robinson	3,385	5.70	–3.55	$1,911.22
Western Block	Doug Christie	272	0.46	–	$97.73
Canadian Action	David Piney	89	0.15	–0.11	$3,523.26
Total valid votes/expense limit		59,429	99.81	–	$84,072.71
Total rejected ballots		112	0.19	–0.07	
Turnout		59,541	68.08	+2.15	
Eligible voters		87,456			
Liberal hold		Swing		–0.52	
Source: Elections Canada

2004 Canadian federal election: Esquimalt—Juan de Fuca
Party	Candidate	Votes	%	±%	Expenditures
Liberal	Keith Martin	19,389	35.30	+11.37	$70,953.15
New Democratic	Randall Garrison	16,821	30.62	+17.21	$36,007.10
Conservative	John Koury	13,271	24.16	–33.57	$62,004.61
Green	Jane Sterk	5,078	9.24	+4.98	$20,392.02
Independent	Jen Fisher-Bradley	229	0.42	–	$5,424.80
Canadian Action	Shawn W. Giles	141	0.26	–	none listed
Total valid votes/expense limit		54,929	99.74	–	$79,941.95
Total rejected ballots		144	0.26	–0.06	
Turnout		55,073	65.93	+4.44	
Eligible voters		83,527			
Liberal gain from Independent		Swing		–2.92	
Change for the Conservatives is based on the combined totals of the Canadian Alliance and the Progressive Conservatives. Liberal candidate Keith Martin lost 14.44 percentage points from his 2000 performance running as a Canadian Alliance candidate.
Source: Elections Canada
