= Barry Cooper (political scientist) =

Canadian political scientist (born 1943)

Barry Cooper FRSC
- Born: Fraser Barry Cooper; 1943 (age 82–83)

Academic background
- Education: University of British Columbia (BA); Duke University (MA, PhD)

Academic work
- Discipline: Political science
- Sub-discipline: Canadian politics; political theory; public policy
- School or tradition: Calgary School
- Institutions: University of Calgary

Fraser Barry Cooper FRSC (born 1943) is a Canadian political scientist at the University of Calgary. Before coming to Calgary, he taught at Bishop's University (1968–1970), McGill University, and York University (1970–1981). The winner of a Killam Research Fellowship, he is a fellow of the Royal Society of Canada. In 1991, Cooper wrote Action into Nature: An Essay on the Meaning of Technology and he co-authored Deconfederation: Canada without Quebec, in which he argued that Canada would benefit from Quebec separation. He is also the author of the 1999 publication Eric Voegelin and the Foundations of Modern Political Science.

He is a fellow at the Centre for Military and Strategic Studies and a senior research fellow at the Canadian Defence and Foreign Affairs Institute. As a regular columnist for the Calgary Herald, Cooper is a frequent commentator on Canadian political issues. He attended high school at Shawnigan Lake School, on Vancouver Island, and received degrees from the University of British Columbia and Duke University.

Cooper is an advocate of climate denialism, Quebec separatism, Western Canadian separatism, with Alberta as an independent, sovereign jurisdiction within Canada.

== Calgary School ==
Cooper is a member of a group of conservative political scientists, the Calgary School, which also includes Tom Flanagan, Rainer Knopff, Ted Morton, and David Bercuson. The group's focus has been to influence public affairs over the long term. (Note: "There are tensions between the socially conservative and economically conservative factions within the school. Bercuson publicly criticized Morton's social policies by saying that they "were hard to stomach for a libertarian." (McLean, Archie. "Morton would use Alberta as his 'guinea pig': Social, religious views will drive policy, expert says", Edmonton Journal, 2 December 2006.) Such division brings into question whether its members reflect a coherent "school" of thought (Wikipedia article on Calgary School).") Cooper, like other members of the Calgary School, strongly advocate against First Nations rights to land and special privilege. In his arguments in a January 2013 article, he cites controversial publication, First Nations? Second Thoughts, in which he countered arguments presented in the Royal Commission on Aboriginal People(1996). Both this publication and Cooper's article argue against these statements by the RCAP: "(1) Aboriginals are privileged because they were here first; (2) there are no significant differences between European and Indian civilizations so that (3) Indians are sovereign nations; accordingly (4) treaties were nation-to-nation agreements that (5) affirmed aboriginal sovereignty and ownership of the land."

In its early years, in the late 1990s, members of the small Calgary School, a group of Calgary-based political science professors, had some influence on Canadian public policy according to an article by David J. Rovinsky from the Center for Strategic and International Studies (CSIS), a public policy research institution based in Washington, DC. In his "Advice to Progressives from the Calgary School" in the Literary Review of Canada, Tom Flanagan wrote, "Knopff and Morton took on judicial activism. Cooper and Bercuson's Deconfederation undermined the Meech Lake agenda of endless concessions to Quebec. In First Nations? Second Thoughts, I stood up against the juggernaut of the Royal Commission on Aboriginal Peoples. All these books were widely discussed in the media and have had some impact on the course of public affairs."

== Climate change ==
During his tenure as the director of the Calgary branch of the Fraser Institute from 1999 to 2005, Cooper began to focus on climate change. He invited Bjørn Lomborg, a Danish political scientist who also worked with the Friends of Science to provide arguments against climate change, to Calgary.

The Friends of Science opposes the Kyoto Protocol and claims to offer "critical evidence that challenges the premises of the Kyoto Protocol and presents alternative causes for climate change."

By 2004, Cooper set up the Science Education Fund which could accept donations through the Calgary Foundation. The Calgary Foundation administers charitable giving in the Calgary area and had "a policy of guarding donors' identities." Albert Jacobs, a geologist and retired oil-explorations manager and member of the Canadian Society of Petroleum Geologists who formed the Friends of Science, described how donations from oil and gas industry donors were passed on to the Science Education Fund set up by Barry Cooper, which in turn supported the activities of the Friends of Science.

In 2004, Talisman Energy, a Calgary-based, global oil and gas exploration and production company, one of Canada's largest independent oil and gas companies, donated $175,000 (Note: According to Canwest News Service reporter, Mike De Souza's article published in the Vancouver Sun in 2011, the letter from University of Calgary account administrator, Chantal-Lee Watt, accompanying $175,000 Talisman cheque, dated 4 November 2004, was part of documents released by the University of Calgary under the orders of Franklin J. Work, the office of Alberta's information and privacy commissioner.) to fund a University of Calgary-based project which journalist Mike De Souza said was a "public relations project designed to cast doubt on scientific evidence linking human activity to global warming." De Souza published the list of significant donations to the Friends of Science which had been received by the press, in an article published in the Vancouver Sun in 2011. Sydney Kahanoff, a Calgary oil and gas executive and philanthropist donated $50,000 through his Kahanoff Foundation, a charity he established in 1979. Murphy Oil matched one of its employees $1,050 donations. Douglas Leahey defended the donations to the Friends of Science from the then CEO of Talisman Energy, James Buckee, (Note: The Calgary Herald described James Buckee's retirement from Talisman in May 2007 as the end of an oilpatch era with Buckee as one of its most colourful characters.) who shared the Friends' views on climate change. Cooper's involvement in the funding of that group was called into question in 2006, when it was reported he helped start a University of Calgary fund the Science Education Fund, which accepted monies from Alberta oil and gas companies, foundations, and individuals and then used some of that charitable donation in the Friends of Science group to produce a video, which is available at friendsofscience.org.

In April 2005, Friends of Science released a 23-minute online video directed by Mike Visser, "Climate Catastrophe Cancelled: What You're Not Being Told About the Science of Climate Change." The video featured consultant Tim Ball, Sallie L. Baliunas, Tim Patterson, Ross McKitrick, and Cooper, all of whom are known for climate change denial. A second edition was released on 13 September 2007.

In 2014, Friends of Science released a billboard in Calgary, Alberta, claiming that the sun, not human activity, is the primary driver of global warming.

In 2020, Cooper submitted a 28-page report, "Background Report on Changes in the Organization and Ideology of Philanthropic Foundations with a Focus on Environmental Issues as Reflected in Contemporary Social Science Research." Also called the "Cooper Report," it had been commissioned by the government of Jason Kenney's Public Inquiry into Anti-Alberta Energy Campaigns.

== Western alienation and Alberta sovereignty ==
Cooper is an advocate of Western Canadian separatism, Cooper co-authored the September 2021 "Free Alberta Strategy" with lawyers, Rob Anderson and Derek From in which they called for Alberta's recognition as a sovereign jurisdiction within Canada. The initiative was supported by United Conservative Party MLAs, Angela Pitt, Jason Stephan, Drew Barnes, and Todd Loewen.

== Selected works ==
- 2020 Barry Cooper (2020). Background Report on Changes in the Organization and Ideology of Philanthropic Foundations with a Focus on Environmental Issues as Reflected in Contemporary Social Science Research (PDF) (Report). Public Inquiry into Anti-Alberta Energy Campaigns. Calgary, Alberta: University of Calgary. p. 28. Archived from the original (PDF) on January 16, 2021.
- 2005 Moens, A. Alexander; Cooper, Barry (2005). "Canadian participation in North American missile defence: a cost-benefit analysis" (PDF). Fraser Institute. Vancouver.
- 2005 Miljan, Lydia; Cooper, Barry (2005), "The Canadian "garrison mentality" and anti-Americanism at the CBC", Fraser Institute, Vancouver
- 2005 Szeto, Ray; Cooper, Barry (2005), "The need for Canadian strategic lift", Fraser Institute, Vancouver
- 2004 Cooper, Barry (2004), "Privacy and security in an age of terrorism", Fraser Institute, Vancouver
- 2004 Cooper, Barry (2004), New political religions, or, an analysis of modern terrorism, Columbia: University of Missouri Press
- 2003 Miljan, Lydia; Cooper, Barry (2003), "Hidden agendas: how journalists influence the news", UBC Press, Vancouver
- 2002 Cooper, Barry (2002), "Unholy terror: the origin and significance of contemporary, religion-based terrorism", Fraser Institute, Vancouver
- 2000 Cooper, Barry; Kanji, Mebs (2000), "Governing in post-deficit times: Alberta in the Klein years", Centre for Public Management, University of Toronto, Toronto
- 1999 Cooper, Barry (July 21, 1999). Eric Voegelin and the Foundations of Modern Political Science (1 ed.). Columbia: University of Missouri. ISBN 978-0-8262-1229-0. On Eric Voegelin (1901–1985).
- 1996 Cooper, Barry (1996), "The Klein achievement", Centre for Public Management, University of Toronto, Toronto
- Bercuson, David Jay, 1945-. Derailed: the betrayal of the national dream / David J. Bercuson and Barry Cooper. -- Toronto: Key Porter Books, 1994.
- Cooper, Barry, 1943-. Sins of omission: shaping the news at CBC TV / Barry Cooper. -- Toronto: University of Toronto Press, 1994.
- 1991 Cooper, Barry (June 1, 1991). Action into Nature: An Essay on the Meaning of Technology. University of Notre Dame Press. ISBN 978-0-268-00629-7.
- Bercuson, David Jay, 1945-. Deconfederation: Canada without Quebec / David Jay Bercuson, Barry Cooper. -- Toronto: Key Porter Books, 1991.
- Cooper, Barry, 1943-. Action into nature: an essay on the meaning of technology / Barry Cooper. -- Notre Dame: University of Notre Dame Press, 1991.
- Bercuson, David Jay, 1945-. Goodbye ... et bonne chance!: les adieux du Canada anglais au Quebec / David J. Bercusson, Barry Cooper; traduit de l'anglais par Claude Fafard et Stephen Dupont. -- Montréal: Le Jour, 1991.
- The Resurgence of conservatism in Anglo-American democracies / edited by Barry Cooper, Allan Kornberg, and William Mishler. -- Durham: Duke University Press, 1988.
- Cooper, Barry, 1943-. Alexander Kennedy Isbister: a respectable critic of the honourable Company / Barry Cooper. -- Ottawa: Carleton University Press, 1988.
- Cooper, Barry, 1943-. Old modes and orders some limits to George Grant's Political theory / Barry Cooper. -- [Canada: s.n.], 1984.
- Cooper, Barry, 1943-. The end of history: an essay on modern Hegelianism / Barry Cooper. -- Toronto: University of Toronto Press, 1984.
- Cooper, Barry, 1943-. Michel Foucault, an introduction to the study of his thought / Barry Cooper. Lewiston, New York: Edwin Mellen Press, 1981.
- Cooper, Barry, 1943-. Merleau-Ponty and Marxism: from terror to reform / Barry Cooper. -- Toronto: University of Toronto Press, 1979.
