= Alberta Agenda =

2001 open letter in Canadian politics

The Alberta Agenda, the Firewall Letter, was a January 2001 open letter by six prominent conservatives in Alberta—including Calgary School professors and Stephen Harper—addressed to then Premier of Alberta, Ralph Klein, setting out a five-point firewall to protect Alberta from the "intrusions" by the federal government. The Alberta government to fully exercise the province's constitutional powers. The group, who called themselves the Alberta Residents League (ARL) proposed the Alberta Agenda—a new vision for the province, which focused on "More Alberta, less Ottawa." The letter was composed by Harper—then president of the National Citizens Coalition. Harper later served as Canada's Prime Minister for three consecutive terms—from 2006 to 2015. Signatories included three political science professors associated with the "Calgary School" as the University of Calgary—Tom Flanagan, Ted Morton, and Rainer Knopff. Other signatories included Andrew Crooks, who was serving as chair of the Canadian Taxpayers Federation, and Ken Boessenkool, Canadian Alliance leader Stockwell Day's former policy adviser. The letter was published in its entirety in the National Post on January 27, 2001.

== Background ==
The Alberta Agenda letter was written in the wake of the Jean Chrétien's Liberal government securing its third consecutive majority government in the 2000 Canadian federal election, while the primarily Alberta-based Canadian Alliance's under Stockwell Day formed the official opposition.

== Firewall Letter ==
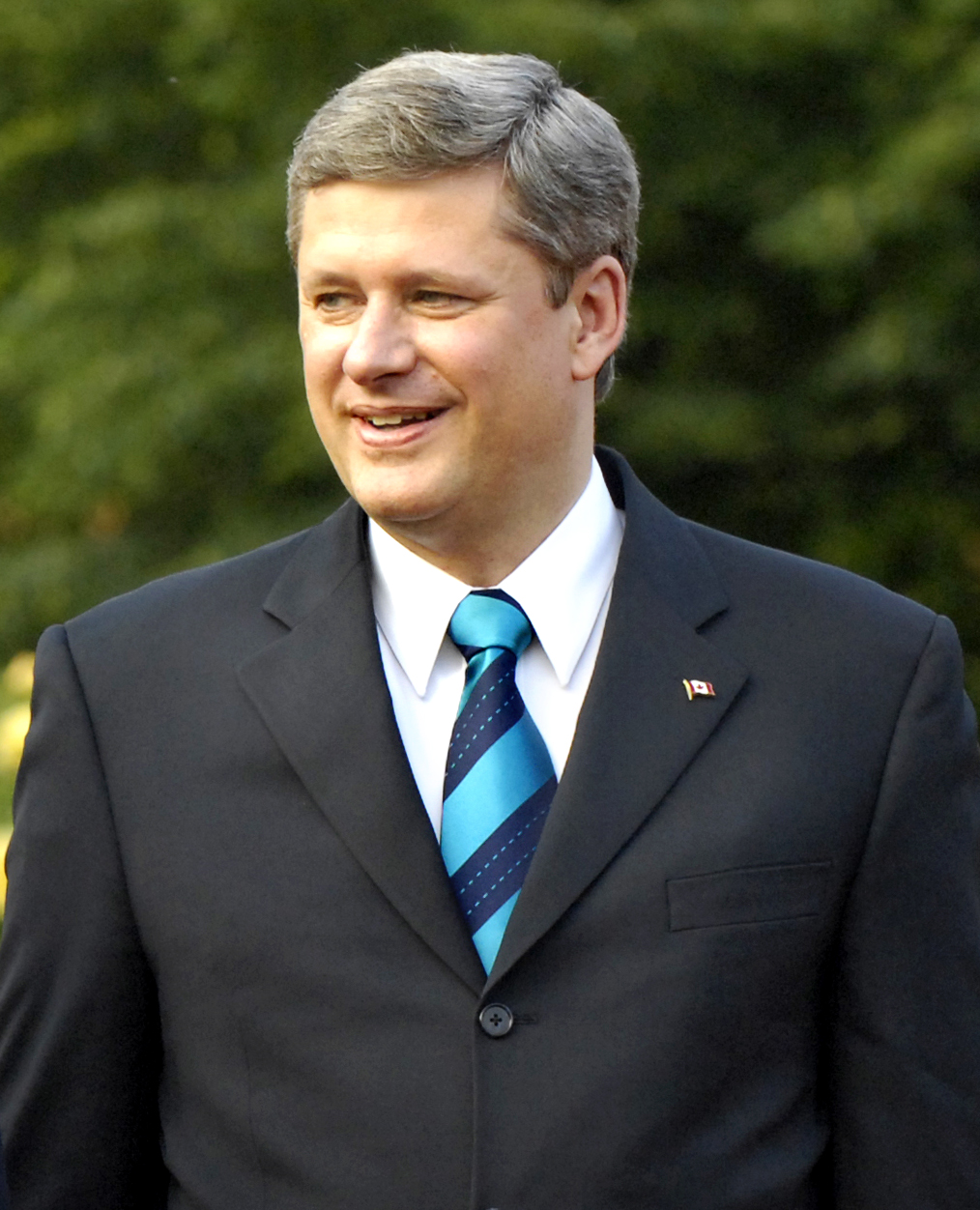
Stephen Harper (2007)

On January 24, 2001, former Member of Parliament and future Prime Minister of Canada Stephen Harper composed a letter which was signed by six other prominent conservative Albertans and sent to then Premier of Alberta, Ralph Klein. Harper resigned his seat in Parliament in January 1997 largely due to opposition between his conservative principles and Preston Manning's populism, following his resignation he would be appointed the vice-president of the National Citizens Coalition, and later president. Others who signed the letter were three University of Calgary professors in public policy—Tom Flanagan, Ted Morton and Rainer Knopff; Andrew Crooks, then-chair of the Canadian Taxpayers Federation; and Ken Boessenkool, who had previously served as Canadian Alliance leader Stockwell Day's former policy adviser.

A 2015 National Post article summarizes the Firewall Letter as a plea for Albertans to insulate themselves against an "increasingly hostile government in Ottawa." Proposals in the letter included that the province should let its contract with the Royal Canadian Mounted Police expire in 2012, and establish a provincial police force to replace the RCMP. Alberta had a separate police force from 1917 until 1932. The letter recommended that Alberta withdraw from the Canada Pension Plan and establish a separate Alberta Pension Plan. It called for a separate collection of the province's income tax, as opposed to letting the Canada Revenue Agency handle tax collection. Two provincesAlberta, and Quebec unlike all the other provinces and territories collect its own corporate tax. The letter called on the province to advocate for Senate reform to return to the national agenda; and taking over complete provincial responsibility for health care.

The letter has been referred to as the Firewall Letter from its use of the phrase "build firewalls around Alberta" a reference to the building practice which block unwanted fire or "intrusions" from outside sources.

Premier Klein's personal response was published in the Edmonton Journal on responded to the letter, but rejected implementing the authors' requests for the duration of his premiership.

== See also ==
- Western alienation
- Buffalo Declaration
- Conservativism in Canada
- Populism in Canada
