= Canadian Taxpayers Federation =

Canadian conservative advocacy organization

- Fédération canadienne des contribuables
- Abbreviation: CTF
- Formation: 1990
- Merger of: Association of Saskatchewan Taxpayers; Resolution One Association of Alberta
- Type: Fiscal conservative advocacy
- Headquarters: Regina, Saskatchewan, Canada
- Members: 7 (2026)
- President and CEO: Scott Hennig
- Chair: Tim McMillan
- Revenue: $4.8 million (2020)
- Expenses: $4.5 million (2020)
- Website: taxpayer.com

The Canadian Taxpayers Federation (CTF; French: Fédération canadienne des contribuables) is a taxpayer advocacy organization in Canada. It was founded in Saskatchewan in 1990 through a merger of the Association of Saskatchewan Taxpayers and the Resolution One Association of Alberta

It describes itself as an organization that advocates for lower taxes, less waste, and an increase in government accountability though others view it as an astroturf organization with ties to Canada's political right.

== Funding and structure ==
The Canadian Taxpayers Federation was founded in Saskatchewan in 1990 through a merger of the Association of Saskatchewan Taxpayers and the Resolution One Association of Alberta which was created in 1989 by Link Byfield.

In 2019 the CTF had 215,000 supporters. In 2018-19 it received $5.1 million from 30,517 donations. The CTF receives no funding from government and accepts no foreign donations. Like all non-profits, it pays no taxes and its donors can choose to remain anonymous.

CTF is an "Atlas Network partner" according to the Atlas Network.

The organization has spokespeople who address issues on a regional basis. CTF staff and board directors are prohibited from holding a membership in or donating funds to any political party and is independent of any institutional affiliations. Voting membership, however, is restricted to the board of directors. According to its by-laws, the board "can have as few as three and as many as 20" members. In 2017, it reportedly had a voting membership of six board members, and in 2020 it had four.

=== Offices ===
The CTF maintains a federal office in Ottawa, and has staff based in Calgary, Vancouver, Victoria, Edmonton, Regina, Toronto, Montreal and Halifax. Provincial offices conduct research and advocacy activities specific to their provinces, and act as regional organizers of Canada-wide initiatives. The group opened the office in Halifax, partly due to a pension scandal in September 2010. In February 2016, the CTF hired its first Quebec Director, based in Montreal.

=== Board of directors ===
The Canadian Taxpayers Federation has a volunteer board of directors. Its mission is to maintain the integrity of the organization, conduct, strategic planning, and finances. It must approve goals, tactics, a budget on an annual basis and members are prohibited from holding a membership in any political party.

As of 2026 the CTF board of directors is composed of Tim McMillan (chair), Blaine Higgs, Sunira Chaudhri, Ken Azzopardi, Joe Coucill, Tim Hudak, and Chris Gardner.

== Activities ==
CTF initiatives include public relations campaigns and paid advertising. Public policy campaigns are intended to incorporate greater involvement and support from the general public. Their representatives regularly appear before legislative hearings and committees. Its directors publish annual detailed pre-budget submissions, as well as reports on public issues including health care, tax reform, and "whistle blower" and freedom of information legislation. The CTF advocates for public policy issues and legislation related to direct democracy, taxpayers protection legislation, and the Canada Pension Plan.

The federation uses a combination of e-mail, media interviews, press conferences, speeches, presentations, stunts, petitions and publications in its advocacy. The CTF publishes The Taxpayer magazine three times a year, sends regular e-mail 'Action Updates', hosts a website/blog and Facebook page and issues opinion commentaries to media outlets.

=== Government spending ===
The organization regularly comments on government spending, and in 1993 built a "debt clock" to display the per-second increase of Canadian's debt and the share owed by each family. The clock was resurrected in 2011 to show the federal debt per capita. The clock is still used at events across the country, most recently in the summer of 2016 when the debt clock was toured across the country by Federal Director Aaron Wudrick to raise awareness of Canada's growing debt burden. There is also an online version at debtclock.ca.

In 1995 the organization also organized 19 Tax Alert rallies to promote lower taxes. The rallies were attended by 20,000 Canadians, and gathered 233,000 petition signatures. At this time, the organization also encouraged governments to adopt legislation requiring budgets to be balanced. Ontario PC Leader Mike Harris signed the pledge drafted by CTF that stated he would not increase taxes without gaining voter approval first.

=== Government salaries and pensions ===
The CTF regularly comments on salaries and pensions of legislators, and is the only organization to regularly calculate and release details about politicians' pensions and benefits. It also has continually advocated against tax-free allowances, which exempt a part of legislators' salaries from income tax. CTF advocated fully taxable salaries in Ontario, BC, Manitoba, Alberta, and Saskatchewan. These provinces made salaries fully taxable, although in 2007 British Columbia reinstated tax-free allowances.

In 1995, It put out 242 pigs on the Parliament Hill lawn to represent MPs who said they would join the new pension plan.

In 2006, the organization advocated that Calgary also remove tax-free allowances for municipal councillors.

In 2010, the organization began publishing reports on the ratio of funding for pensions between taxpayers and legislators. In June it was released that the ratio for the members of parliament was $4 for every $1 contributed by a parliamentarian. A more recent report showed that in New Brunswick the ratio was $16 to every $1, and for Nova Scotia it was $22 to every $1. The pension plan costs taxpayers $7.5 million annually. In Nova Scotia, 24 MLA's could collect $23 million in benefits if they live till they are 75. CTF has advocated that the pension plans be changed to have equal contributions from taxpayers and legislators, and for a citizen's oversight body to make recommendations for MLA compensation.

In reaction to the report, former Nova Scotia Premier Darrell Dexter said that he was open to reviewing the process for pensions, but that he was not ready to review it at the time. Dexter was slated to collect $2 million in pension benefits.

During 2012, the CTF ran a national campaign to get MPs to reform their pensions. They launched billboards across the country targeting the $24 to $1 contribution ratio (taxpayers to MPs), ran a video in Toronto bar and gym bathrooms, and flew an airplane towing a banner behind it over Parliament Hill demanding pension reform. After years of CTF advocacy, MPs reformed their pensions in October 2012, significantly reducing overall benefit levels for current and future Members of Parliament.

In 2013, CTF began demanding that convicted politicians lose their pensions.

=== Taxes ===
From 2003 to 2008, CTF worked to abolish the Alberta Health Premium, criticizing it for not funding health care, having high administrative costs, and for being a "regressive tax". In 2008, Premier Ed Stelmach abolished the tax, which had previously brought in $900 million to the province's general revenue fund. The tax cut saved individuals $528 and families $1,056 on average.

Starting in 1997, CTF worked to put an end to what was called "bracket creep," where tax brackets were not released indexed to inflation. This resulted in numerous Canadians being bumped up to a higher tax bracket, despite not being any wealthier in real terms. The organization launched a national campaign to fight this practice both federally and provincially. The campaign worked an put an end to bracket creep federally in 2000. Other provinces followed suit. The last province to put an end to this practice was Manitoba in 2017. As of 2020, bracket creep remains a reality in Alberta, Saskatchewan, Prince Edward Island, and Nova Scotia

In 2015 CTF organized the no side for the transit tax referendum in British Columbia's Lower Mainland, proposing a 0.5% increase in the local sales tax to finance transit infrastructure in the greater Vancouver area. Despite being outspent more than 160-to-1 by the yes side, the CTF no side won the referendum with 61.7% of the popular vote.

By 2020, the government of British Columbia eliminated MSP premiums after years of advocacy by the CTF.

The organization holds an annual "Gas Tax Honesty" day. As of 2010, over 150,000 Canadians signed the CTF's gas tax petition demanding lower and dedicated fuel taxes. The organization advocates that fuel taxes be dedicated to a "municipal roadway trust" and not to general spending. Manitoba and Saskatchewan have passed legislation requiring the fuel tax be dedicated to roads.

=== Government transparency ===
In 1990 the CTF led a petition drive in Saskatchewan and Alberta which led to the implementation of freedom of information legislation (FOI). The organization also organized advocates in British Columbia and Manitoba to oppose the weakening of existing FOI laws. CTF also participates in "Right to Know Week", where multiple organizations advocate more open government.

In 2009, CTF joined the Canadian Newspaper Association and BC Freedom of Information and Privacy Association requesting that the Prime Minister follow U.S. President Barack Obama's example and post details of stimulus spending online.

More recently, the organization demanded that Members of the Legislative Assembly of Alberta (MLAs) post their credit card receipts and expenses online, and that the Legislative Assembly's expenses be subject to the Freedom of Information and Protection of Privacy Act. This was in addition to a petition to have members of parliament (MPs) and senators be audited after audits of the British parliament and Nova Scotia members revealed wasteful and unethical spending. In June, the House of Commons agreed to allow spot audits but would not allow the release the names of those being audited.

CTF also supported Ontario PC Member of Provincial Parliament Lisa MacLeod's effort to disclose all contracts and grants over $10,000 and travel/hospitality expenses.

In 2012, the Alberta government began requiring 400 senior staff and MLAs to post expenses, including receipts, online.

=== Aboriginal policy reform ===
In 2002, Gordon Benoit went to court in Ottawa, saying that an oral promise made to his ancestors in 1899 exempted him and all Treaty 8 Indians from paying taxes. Benoit was challenged by the CTF who argued that a race-based tax exemption would violate equality provisions, international treaties and the basic principles of fairness. In March 2002, Benoit won his first case when Judge Douglas Campbell ruled in his favour. However, CTF appealed the decision and the second ruling was in their favor, with the Supreme Court dismissing the case in 2004.

In December 2009, the CTF worked with a whistleblower in Manitoba to expose what it referred to as outrageous salaries on the Peguis First Nation. While disclosing the pay to the media, the CTF began a long campaign to convince the federal government to begin posting the salaries of all aboriginal politicians' pay online as well as each reserve's annual audit documents.

In November 2010, with data obtained through access to information requests, they released a report that revealed for 2008-09 that over 80 reserve politicians earned more than the after-tax income of $184,000 of Prime Minister Stephen Harper in the same period. 222 reserve politicians were paid more in tax-free income in 2008-09 than their respective provincial premiers, who averaged an after-tax income of $109,893. One reserve politician in Atlantic Canada was found to have been paid a combined tax-free salary and honorarium totaling $978,468. The amounts for reserve politicians included travel and per diems in comparison to the base salary of other politicians

In 2013, the federal government passed bill C-27 requiring all aboriginal bands to disclose on a public website their compensation amounts. After the federal government's decision to put on hold numerous enforcement measures in 2015 resulting in a much lower compliance rate, the CTF helped First Nations activist Charmaine Stick to mount a court battle with the Onion Lake Cree Nation so that it would release its finances. In 2017 they claimed victory after a Saskatchewan court ordered Onion Lake Cree Nation to disclose its finances. The judgment was upheld by the Saskatchewan Court of Appeals in 2018.

=== Canadian Firearms Registry ===
The organization has opposed the Canadian Firearms Registry, calling it "ill-conceived crime-fighting measure that did little more than add paperwork and expenses for hunters, farmers and recreational gun users." In 2010, the CTF supported private member's bill C-391 which would have eliminated the registry. The federal government eliminated the registry in April 2012 with the passing of bill C-19.

=== Generation Screwed ===
Generation Screwed, is a non-partisan campus-based movement seeking to raise awareness on the issues of government debt and unfunded liabilities, and how they affect young Canadians. Founded in 2013 as a Canadian Taxpayers Federation initiative, the movement is currently the biggest free-market oriented campus initiative in Canada, with active clubs on 29 campuses across nine provinces.

=== Events ===
==== Gas Tax Honesty Day ====
Gas Tax Honesty Day is a day where the organization advocates for federal and provincial governments to end the practice of calculating the GST or HST after it has already levied provincial and federal excise taxes on gasoline. The organization has organized this occasion for 20 years as of 2018. CTF reported that Canada collected $1.6 billion in additional taxes due to this practice. To calculate the costs of these practices the organization publishes yearly reports. The 2018 report shows that on average taxes make 33% of the pump price for gasoline and 30% diesel. It also shows that tax-on- tax on gas costs an extra 3 cents per liter on average, allowing governments to rake in an additional $1.84 billion in revenue.

==== TaxFighter Award ====
The TaxFighter Award given by the organization to Canadian citizens which it believes demonstrates commitment and dedication to the cause of "taxpayer emancipation." The awards have been given since 2000. Some of the most recent winners include Former premier Ralph Klein and his first finance minister Jim Dinning for passing balanced budgets without increasing taxes. Other past winners include Dave Rutherford, a talk radio host, has also received the award after being on the air for 42 years. In 2007, it was granted to three people: National Post & Edmonton Journal columnist Lorne Gunter, Winnipeg Sun columnist Tom Brodbeck, and Edmonton senior Patricia Ehli. In 2000, CTF awarded Mike Harris the award for the passage of the Taxpayer Protection and Balanced Budget Act.

Recent History of the Award Winners

Year	Recipient	For
2019	Charmaine Stick	The Canadian Taxpayers Federation presented Charmaine Stick with the TaxFighter Award for her courageous struggle for accountability and transparency at the Onion Lake Cree Nation and in First Nations communities across Canada.
2018	Calgary School	Tom Flanagan, Barry Cooper, Ted Morton and Rainer Knopff, for making the case for limited government and proposing reforms to Canada's Institutions.
2017	Terence Corcoran	Currently a columnist for the Financial Post has been at the vanguard of the fight for lower taxes, free markets, limited and accountable government for four decades.
2016	Irv Leroux	In his decade-long battle with the Canada Revenue Agency over its wrongful tax claim, the courts ruled the CRA owed a Duty of Care to Canadians
2015	Stockwell Day	His contribution to Alberta with the establishment of a flat income tax
2013	Kevin Page	Under Page's leadership, the Parliamentary Budget Office's ground-breaking work on military procurement, personnel costs, and macroeconomic forecasting won the praise of the International Monetary Fund, and national legislative budget officers around the world.
2013	Preston Manning; Werner Schmidt; Lee Morrison	Manning: Opted out of the gold-plated MP pension plan in 1993 that saved Canadian Taxpayers an amount of $66,602 per year, totaling $676,609 in forgone pension payments up to 2013; Schmidt: Opted out of the gold-plated MP pension plan in 1993 that saved Canadian Taxpayers an amount of $47,172 per year, totaling $324,996 in forgone pension payments up to 2013. Morrison: Opted out of the gold-plated MP pension plan in 1993 that saved Canadian Taxpayers an amount of $38,560 per year, totaling $451,043 up to 2013.
2011	Jim Dinning; Ralph Klein	Balanced the budget in Alberta in the period of 1994–95 after a decade of deficits without raising taxes.
2007	Lorne Gunter; Patricia Ehli; Tom Brodbeck	Brodbeck: Relentlessly hounding the Winnipeg and Manitoba governments to reduce government waste, lower taxes and be more accountable; Ehli: Collecting some 1,200 signatures herself to oppose large property tax hikes; Gunter: Distinguished advocate for smaller government and critical analyst on the costs of climate change reduction policies for taxpayers
2001	Kevin Page	Drafting the model of the Taxpayer protection legislation
2000	Mike Harris	Passage of the Taxpayer Protection and Balanced Budget Act.

==== Teddy Awards ====
The "Teddies" are awarded to government entities and politicians wasteful spending or high taxes. Founded in 1999, The Teddies are named after Ted Weatherill, a former Chairman of the Canada Labour Relations Board who was terminated in 1998 for expenses incompatible with his position. The expenses included $150,000 in meals over eight years and over $700 for a lunch in Paris.

Three golden sows are awarded federally, provincially and a lifetime achievement to any bureaucrat, politician, government or government agency every February.

History of Award Winners

Year	The Federal Teddy	The Provincial Teddy	The Municipal Teddy	Lifetime Achievement Teddy
2020	Global Affairs Canada's Mission Cultural Fund.	Yukon Department of Tourism's gold in the creek campaign.	The City of Toronto's Euchregate.	Ex-Mayor of Montreal Michael Applebaum.
2019	Prime Minister Trudeau's Trip to India.	B.C. Legislature Clerk Craig James and Sergeant-at-Arms Gary Lenz for frivolous trips and expenses on taxpayer dollars.	The City of Vancouver's Parks Board for Email-a-Tree Project.	Ex-Governor General Adrienne Clarkson for her $1.1 million in taxpayer bills since leaving office.
2018	Heritage Canada for $8.2 million Canada 150 temporary Parliament Hill ice rink.	Ontario's Fair Hydro Plan costing Ontarians $39 billion.	City of Montreal for $34 million Formula E subsidies.	The City of Calgary for its gaffe-prone public art policy.
2017	Canada Revenue Agency for a $538,000 relocation payment to an unnamed employee who moved 192 km.	Ontario's Electric Vehicle Incentive Program for taxpayer subsidies for luxury cars.	City of Victoria for its $105 million 46 metre "Blue Bridge".	The Government of Ontario for wasting billions on above-market energy contracts, the Green Energy Act, cancelled power plants, bungled smart meters, and carbon cap and trade.
2016	Canada's 2016 COP Paris Delegation - which at 283 people was four times larger than the 2015 delegation.	Prince Edward Island's Department of Tourism and Culture for racy 2015 tourism guide cover.	City of Calgary for its waste station "Poop Palace".	Bombardier for receiving at least $3.8 billion in taxpayer handouts since 1966.
2015	Former MP, Cabinet Minister and Mayor of London Joe Fontana – convicted of breach of trust, fraud and uttering forged documents for filing a $1,700 expense claim for a function with the Minister of Finance, when it was actually for his son's wedding expenses.	Ontario's Ministry of Energy for installing 4.8 million 'smart' energy meters that ran nearly $1 billion over budget without reducing power use.	Halifax Regional Municipality Councillor Brad Johns for a $25,000 18-foot talking Christmas Tree	Vancouver's TransLink for wasting millions of dollars.
2014	Employment and Social Development Canada – wasted $2.5 million on 2013 Stanley Cup playoffs advertising for the non-existent Canada Jobs Grant.	Fired Toronto Pan-Am Games boss Ian Troop who earned $552,065 a year, claimed $8,500 for a lavish party in Mexico and made the event $1.1 billion over budget.	Vancouver's TransLink builds $4.5 million parking lot that no one uses	The Canadian Senate due to scandals with certain senators.
2013	Chief Roger Redman, whom earned more than the Prime Minister for leading the Standing Buffalo First Nation.	Former Alberta Tourism Minister Christine Cusanelli for canceling a junket for the London games and $113,000 in empty hotel rooms.	The Toronto Maintenance and Skilled Trades Council for its $158 million bill for the Toronto Public School District, including $143 to attach a pencil sharpener to a desk and $266 for hanging three pictures on a wall.	Bev Oda for expensing chauffeured limos, luxury hotels, an air purifier so she could smoke in her office, and a $52,000 annual pension.
2012	Agriculture Canada Tobacco Transition Program which doubled the number of tobacco farmers in Canada instead of reducing it.	Alberta MLA's who earn $1,000 monthly for a committee that hasn't held a meeting since 2008.	Montreal's snowplow service, which was billed before snowfall.	Gilles Duceppe for collecting $140,765 in pensions after losing his seat in Parliament.
2011	G8/G20 costing $1.24 billion	Ontario tax collectors paid severance for keeping jobs: $56-million (max estimate)	Edmonton haiku contest on riding the city bus, where the award was $5,000.	Former Toronto Mayor, David Miller, for increasing the city's operation budget by 44 percent ($2.8 billion) and the city's debt by over $1 billion.
2010	MP Mailer Mail service, where the cost increased by $4.1 million in three years.	Nova Scotia MLA Expenses, including expenses from Len Goucher for expensing 11 computers, 12 printers, 5 digital cameras, 4 video cameras and the Xbox game Dance Dance Revolution.	City of Toronto's Homeless Audit, which paid people $100 daily to dress up and pretend to be homeless.	"Gold-plated" MP Pensions
2009	Canada Council for the Arts, which spent $15,000 last year to help bring a Belgian art exhibit to Quebec that produces a poop-like substance when fed with food. It also spent $40,000 on a project that seeks to fly a giant inflatable banana over the state of Texas.	All Nations Coordinated Response Network for hosting a $2,292 spa day for its employees.	City of Vancouver for its 2010 Olympic athletes village for incurring $875-million in debt for building the condos.	The "Big 3" auto bailout which cost $780-million in grants and loans.
2008	Senator Raymond Lavigne for having a staffer cut down a neighbor's tree and for the $23,500 for travel, being charged with fraud, breach of trust, and obstruction of justice after the ensuing investigation.	Former Lieutenant Governor Lise Thibault, who reported over $700,000 in expenses.	Former Toronto Catholic School Board Trustee Christine Nunziata for expensing vacations in Cuba and the Dominican Republic.	Canadian Tax Code, which has increased from 11 pages in 1917 to 2,226 pages.
2007	CTF awarded Colin Kenny the Federal Teddy for arranging a week long trip to Dubai where only one three-hour meeting was scheduled and the hotel bill cost taxpayers $30,000	The Provincial Award went to Tom Parkinson, CEO of Hydro One for having $45,000 in personal expenses, a $1.5 million salary and a $3 million severance check.	The Municipal Award went to the city of Edmonton spent $30,000 to hire 30 actors from Washington, D.C, to hand out yo-yos in the U.S. capital on Canada Day.	The Lifetime Achievement Award went to Ontario Premier Dalton McGuinty for passing the largest tax hike in Ontario's history and passing several deficit budgets.
2006	Joe Volpe, MP for Eglinton Lawrence for charging $60,000 in travel and hospitably expenses in a few months.	Retracted.	City of Richmond local council for incurring the following expenses for building an Olympic speed skating rink: $460,000 travel, $325,000 has gone to consultants, $500,000 to programming, $960,537 for site preparation and over $2.3 million for a design drawing.	David Dingwall for having $846,464 in expenses for meals, travel, limousines rides, and country club memberships.
2005	Lucie McClung, Commissioner of the Correctional Service of Canada, for spending $142,000 traveling to Hong Kong, New Zealand, Brazil, Barbados and Europe. She also expensed $9,000 in meals, her $500 Rideau Club membership fee and arranged a spa day for prisoners.	Roy Romanow for a $36 million potato farm that went bust	Toronto City Hall for spending almost $1 million on hotel rooms for the homeless, who never checked in.	André Ouellet for having $2 million in expenses without showing any receipts.
2004	Public Works Minister Alfonso Gagliano paying $1.5-million for three identical reports. The Auditor-General recently revealed $100-million was paid to firms for little or no work.	Manitoba Arts Council for awarding 5,000 tax dollars to fund Aliza Amihude's jewelry made with her toenails, pubic hair, mouse droppings and dead ladybugs.	Adrienne Clarkson for taking a $5.3-million trip to Finland, Russia, and Iceland despite having no foreign policy role.	
2003	The Canadian Firearms Centre for costing $1 billion in oversight	City of Winnipeg for its $1 million toilet	-	Prime Minister Jean Chrétien
2002	Farm Credit Canada (FCC) for its $433,000 name change from Farm Credit Corporation to Farm Credit Canada	Alberta for having $732,064 in legal bills	-	Minister Brian Tobin for his championing the $2 billion to $5 billion broadband boondoggle project
2001	Canadian Alliance MPs elected in 1993 that opted backed into the MP pension plan	SIGA and its former CEO for squandering $1.7 million of public money	-	British Columbia Premier Glen Clark raised income taxes, surtaxes, user fees, crown corporation fees, property taxes, automobile taxes, liquor taxes, cigarette taxes, estate taxes, medicare taxes, corporate capital taxes, general business taxes, small business taxes, resource taxes, sales taxes and fuel taxes by a whopping $1.5 billion over two budgets.
2000	Human Resources and Development Canada grant jobs scandal	Government of British Columbia for the Fast Ferry Fiasco: The Audit	-	Heritage Minister Sheila Copps for her legacy of anti-taxpayer initiatives

== Ties to Canada's political right ==
Many of the federation's provincial directors had roots in conservative parties. Politicians with roots in the federation include former Alberta Premier Jason Kenney, who was the federation's CEO in the early 1990s. Former Alberta Director and National Research Director Derek Fildebrandt was previously a separatist MLA for Strathmore-Brooks. Former Alberta director John Carpay was a Reform Party candidate in the riding of Burnaby-Kingsway in the 1993 federal election, and is now president of the Justice Centre for Constitutional Freedoms. Walter Robinson, CTF federal director from 1998 to 2004, left the position to run as a Conservative in the 2004 federal election in Ottawa-Orléans.

John Williamson, a former Federal Director, is the Conservative MP for New Brunswick Southwest. Adrienne Batra, the CTF's former Manitoba Director, later became the editor-in-chief of conservative tabloid the Toronto Sun and previously worked as press secretary to then Toronto Mayor Rob Ford. Mark Milke, the CTF's former Alberta and BC Director has worked with various free-market thinktanks. David Maclean, the CTF's former Saskatchewan Director is now Vice President with the Canadian Manufacturers and Exporters. Former Research Director Adam Taylor is currently the principal and co-founder of Export Action Global. Former Alberta Director Mitch Gray is an entrepreneur who owns many businesses in Alberta and abroad. Former Saskatchewan Director Richard Truscott is currently Vice President, British Columbia and Alberta, for the Canadian Federation of Independent Businesses. Former Manitoba Director Victor Vrisnik is currently government affairs manager for 7-11 Canada. Former Ontario Director Tasha Kheiriddin is a journalist and hosted her own show on Global News Radio 640 in Toronto. Kheiriddin, who co-authored Rescuing Canada's Right: Blueprint for a Conservative Revolution with future CTF chair Adam Daifallah in 2005, was president of the Progressive Conservative (PC) Youth Federation from 1994 to 1998. She later served as a ministerial aide in the government of Ontario PC premier Mike Harris.

Adrienne Batra of the Manitoba office worked as a staff person for the Saskatchewan Party in Saskatchewan. Former Ontario Director Candice Malcolm was a columnist for the Sun newspaper chain and founder of True North Initiative. Former BC Director Jordan Bateman is now the Director of Marketing and Communications for the Independent Contractors and Businesses Association. Sara MacIntyre, the federation's BC director, worked as a researcher in the Conservative Party of Canada's leader's office in Ottawa. After leaving CTF, she became Prime Minister Stephen Harper's press secretary. In the 2019 Canadian federal election, Lee Harding, the CTF Saskatchewan director ran as a candidate in the Cypress Hills—Grasslands riding for the far-right People Party of Canada. On April 18, 2024, Politico reported that federal director Franco Terrazzano attended an house party in Mississauga, Ontario as a donor to Federal Conservative leader, Pierre Poilievre.

== Criticism ==
The Federation has been criticized of being an astroturf organization.

=== Dispute with the Manitoba Government ===
The 2006 Provincial/Municipal Teddy was awarded to the Manitoba provincial government for "Special Achievement in Cosmetic Makeover and Budget Misallocation". The CTF accused the Winnipeg Regional Health Authority of spending money on unnecessary cosmetic surgery, including $981,000 for 218 abdominoplasty and other fat-reducing surgeries, and $10,900 for 31 vials of Botox. The following day the Winnipeg Free Press printed a follow-up story ("Foolish funding? Not a bit, MDs say") with information from Manitoba doctors indicating that the expenditures were for necessary medical treatments. The abdominoplasties were performed on patients with chronic stomach infections that did not respond to antibiotics, while the botulinum toxin was used to treat spastic muscle disorders such as multiple sclerosis.

On March 9, 2006, the Canadian Taxpayers Federation announced a withdrawal of the Teddy Award given to the government of Manitoba. The withdrawal claimed that a December 4, 2005 story in the Winnipeg Sun implied that the Botox treatments and abdominoplasties were for cosmetic purposes.

=== Climate change denial ===
The CTF has been described by academic researchers as an astroturf business advocacy group that promotes climate change denial and opposes efforts by the Canadian government to reduce carbon emissions. In the run-up to the implementation of the British Columbia carbon tax in July 2008, CTF began campaigning against it, publishing reports and opinion pieces, and engaging in lobbying. In an op-ed for the Toronto Star in June of that year, the federal director of CTF denied CO₂ was a pollutant. In 2010, the same federal director told the Halifax Media Co-op, "We don't believe there's such thing as man-made climate change" and disputed the scientific consensus, saying "I disagree with the characterization that there's consensus". Researchers later identified the CTF as part of the Atlas Network and analyzed the social network of similar think tanks. They found that CTF was a member of what they called the "petrobloc", a coalition of groups "dedicated to fossil fuel expansion".

Sociologist Timothy J. Haney writes that among the Canadian groups that engage in climate denial as members of the Atlas Network, CTF plays an important role, along with the Fraser Institute, C.D. Howe Institute, and the Frontier Centre for Public Policy. Haney also found that CTF was closely associated with Friends of Science (FoS), a climate denial organization funded by the fossil fuel industry and based in Calgary, Alberta, the center of the oil sands industry. Haney argues that this kind of climate denial is deliberate, "to ensure continued extraction from Alberta's tar sands". A year before Canada's national climate strategy was released, CTF mounted another campaign against carbon taxes in 2016. Several years later, CTF helped sponsor "Road to Change", an FoS event produced in 2024. In a promotional advertisement for the event, FoS disputed the scientific findings of the Intergovernmental Panel on Climate Change.

Canadian scientist David Suzuki and Ian Hanington have stated that information regarding CTF's funding sources is not publicly available and that the group "is on record as denying the existence of human-caused climate change". They argue that campaigns run by climate denial groups in both the U.S. and Canada have similarities. For example, in 2015, some groups connected to the Koch network and the Heartland Institute argued in a letter to the U.S. Congress that "Transportation infrastructure has a spending problem, not a revenue problem", a talking point similar to the one used by CTF that same year in their anti-transit campaign in Vancouver.
