= Calgary School =

Proposed group of Canadian political science professors

The Calgary School is a term coined by Ralph Hedlin in an article in the now defunct Alberta Report in reference to four political science professors – Tom Flanagan, Rainer Knopff, Ted Morton, and Barry F. Cooper – who became colleagues at Alberta's University of Calgary in the early 1980s. They shared and promoted similar ideas about how political scientists could shape the rise of a particular kind of conservatism in Canada – informed by theories based on Friedrich Hayek and Leo Strauss. Cooper and Flanagan had met in the 1960s at Duke University while pursuing doctoral studies, while Knopff and Morton were both mentored by Walter Berns, a prominent Straussian, at the University of Toronto. They were economic, foreign policy, and social conservatives who were anti-abortion and were not in favour of legalizing gay marriage. They supported Stephen Harper in his 1993 election campaign, and former Alberta premiers Ralph Klein and Jason Kenney. A fifth University of Calgary professor, David Bercuson, co-authored publications with Cooper but was more loosely associated with the group and, at times, disagreed with the others on these public policies and candidates.

By 1992, the four professors were influential in the policies of the Reform Party of Canada. The Reform Party had been established in the 1980s, in response to Western Canada's protest against the Progressive Conservative federal government of Brian Mulroney. The party became the Canadian Alliance in 2000, and then merged with the Progressive Conservative Party in 2003 to form the modern-day Conservative Party of Canada.

Flanagan, Morton, Knopff, and Stephen Harper co-signed the January 2001 "Firewall Letter" to then Alberta Premier Ralph Klein calling for major changes in federal-provincial relations that would "insulate" Alberta from the federal government.

Harper who served as Prime Minister of Canada from 2006 to 2015, was associated with the Calgary School in the 1990s and early 2000s, but he distanced himself from Flanagan once he became prime minister.

In 2010, Flanagan said the Calgary School professors and their students had contributed to the rise of conservative ideas in Canada.

In 2018, the four original members of the school received the "TaxFighter Award" from the Canadian Taxpayers Federation.

== Overview ==
=== The 1980s ===
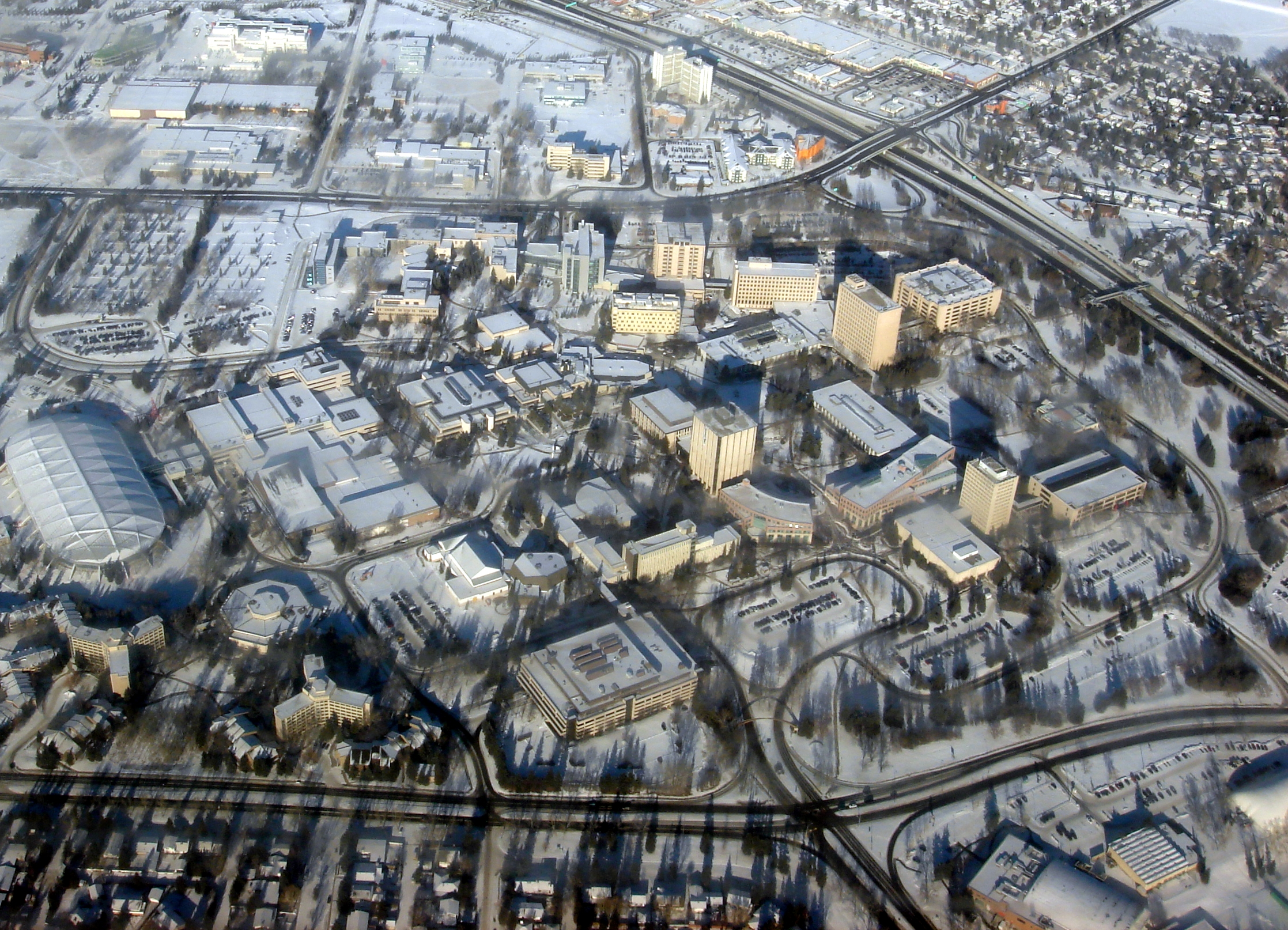
University of Calgary

In 2018, Mark Milke described the Calgary School by referring to its four original members, Cooper, Flanagan, Knopff and Morton, during a presentation at a 2018 Canadian Taxpayers Federation event. Milke said that the Calgary School's "driving idea" was informed by Tom Flanagan's understanding of the Austrian economist Friedrich Hayek. Hayek had said that "spontaneous order arises when people are left to spontaneously order themselves ... We do not require the state to help organize us."

While working on the doctorates at the University of Toronto in the 1970s, Knopff and Morton were mentored by Walter Berns, an American constitutional law and political philosophy professor and an American Enterprise Institute scholar. Berns was a prominent student of Leo Strauss. When they completed their PhDs in the 1980s, they were hired by the University of Calgary. They shared Flanagan's discontent with the eastern establishment in Ottawa. Knopff and Morton opposed the Canadian Charter of Rights and Freedoms. Morton, who received his dual American-Canadian citizenship in 1993, grew up in the United States.

Cooper and Flanagan met in the mid-1960s while pursuing doctoral studies at Duke University in Durham, North Carolina. Cooper came to the University of Calgary in 1981. By the 1980s, all four professors were working at the University of Calgary, but they did not have a visible impact on the public agenda.

=== 1990s ===
Ezra Levant was one of their students in the early 1990s and he joined the Reform party at that time. Unlike his professors, he received a lot of media attention. In the 1990s Levant worked in Preston Manning's office in Ottawa, where he joined Rahim Jaffer, Jason Kenney and Rob Anders in what became known in Ottawa as the "Snack Pack".

According to Milke, it was Ralph Hedlin, a journalist with the Alberta Report who coined the name "Calgary School". Knopff preferred the name "Calgary mafia", coined by the Globe and Mail political columnist Jeffrey Simpson in 1992. Simpson was referring to the influence – direct and indirect – that Flanagan, Knopff, Morton, Bercuson, and Cooper had on Preston Manning's Reform Party of Canada. The Reform Party was a federal party that gave voice to Western Canada's discontent with the Progressive Conservative (PC) federal government under Prime Minister Brian Mulroney. In the 1990s, the Reform Party attacked Mulroney's federal government – which had been in power for nine years – for the deficit, the GST, and the Charlottetown Accord of 1992. In response, colleagues in University of Calgary's department, where four of the five teach, wrote to the Globe distancing themselves from the Reform Party and from the Calgary School.

Bercuson, who had been at the University of Calgary since 1970, had earned his PhD in history at the University of Toronto with a focus on liberal and social democratic theory. Over the years he became more conservative. Bercuson was not a political scientist like Flanagan, Knopff, Morton but he co-published with Cooper because of a shared interest in military history. Bercuson was an "economic and foreign policy conservative" like the other four, but he was more of a "social liberal". He supported pro-choice on abortion, and was in favor of legalizing gay marriage, unlike the others. He did not support Harper in 1993 as did the others, although he did support him in 2006. While the others supported Ralph Klein, Bercuson supported a Liberal candidate.

The four professors said that the competition between the historical Progressive Conservative Party of Canada and the Reform Party of Canada, was helping the centrist Liberal Party of Canada. The Calgary School aimed to reshape of Conservative politics in Canada in the early 1990s. Members of the school, notably Tom Flanagan, worked hard to turn the Reform Party into the dominant right-wing party and later to encourage a coalition of conservative parties. Flanagan, who has widely published in areas such as political science, public policy, political theory and aboriginal land claims, from a libertarian perspective, and has self-described as a Hayekian, was associated with the Calgary School from its inception in the 1990s. In 1997, Harper and Flanagan co-authored a "detailed, persuasive and deeply-researched" article calling on opposition parties in the federal government to compromise and form a coalition governments to "curb the tendency to a 'one-party state'", which they called "a benign dictatorship." detailed, persuasive and deeply-researched plea for governments to be forced to compromise with opposition coalitions. That's the only way, said Harper and Flanagan, to curb the tendency to a "one-party state" induced by Canada's "winner take all" system. They cited the "forced cohabitation" during the presidency of Bill Clinton who had to work with a Republican Congress after 1996. Stephen Harper, who had been a student at the University of Calgary, participating in discussions with members of the school and Preston Manning in the lead up to the formation of the Reform Party. Harper played a role in the development of the Blue Book; which help developed the policies of the Reform Party.

In a 1998 Center for Strategic and International Studies (CSIS) article, American political scientist David Rovinsky used the term "Calgary School" referencing the Chicago school of economics. Both Hayek and Nobel laureate Milton Friedman, who were influential in the Chicago School of Economics, had worked together in 1947 to establish the Mont Pèlerin Society, an international forum for libertarian economists.

During 1950–1962, Hayek was a faculty member of the Committee of Social Thought at the University of Chicago, where he conducted a number of influential faculty seminars. There were a number of Chicago academics who worked on research projects sympathetic to some of Hayek's own, such as Aaron Director, who was active in the Chicago School in helping to fund and establish what became the "Law and Society" program in the University of Chicago Law School. Hayek and Friedman also cooperated in support of the Intercollegiate Society of Individualists, later renamed the Intercollegiate Studies Institute, an American student organisation devoted to libertarian ideas.

=== 2000s ===
==== Firewall Letter ====
On January 24, 2001, Stephen Harper, Tom Flanagan, Ted Morton, Rainer Knopff, Andrew Crooks, then-chair of the Canadian Taxpayers Federation, and Ken Boessenkool wrote a letter to then Premier of Alberta, Ralph Klein, which has been called the "Firewall Letter". The letter called on Albertans to insulate themselves against an "increasingly hostile" Liberal federal government. The group called for the creation of a provincial pension plan, similar to the Quebec Pension Plan, a provincial police force, such as those in Quebec and Ontario, an Alberta provincial income tax, like the one that Quebec had, Senate reform, and Alberta's complete control over its provincial health care. Boessenkool had previously served as Canadian Alliance leader Stockwell Day's policy adviser.

In 2001, Flanagan was the Canadian Taxpayers Federation's director, Morton was Alberta Senator-elect, and Boessenkool was chief of staff to Premier Christy Clark. Boessenkool had previously served as Canadian Alliance leader Stockwell Day's policy adviser.

In December 2003, Flanagan worked on the merger of the Progressive Conservative Party of Canada and the successor to the Reform Party the Canadian Alliance that created the new Conservative Party of Canada. In March 2004, Stephen Harper was elected as the leader of the newly formed Conservative Party. Flanagan played a key role in the development of the new party's platform, helped to build its successful fundraising campaign, and worked on its 2006 election campaign. In 2006, Harper became prime minister. A 2004 article in The Walrus, entitled "The Man Behind Stephen Harper" said that the "Calgary School" which included Tom Flanagan, Rainer Knopff, Ted Morton, David Bercuson, and Barry Cooper, was a politically conservative group supporting "a rambunctious, Rocky Mountain brand of libertarianism" that seeks "lower taxes, less federal government, and free markets unfettered by social programs such as medicare that keep citizens from being forced to pull up their own socks."

By 2006, there were tensions between the socially conservative and economically conservative factions within the school. Bercuson publicly criticized Morton's social policies, saying "[they] were hard to stomach for a libertarian." Ted Morton had served in Progressive Conservative government of Alberta cabinet as finance minister in the Ed Stelmach government and energy minister in the first Alison Redford-led government.

From about 2006 on, Prime Minister Harper and his caucus were often "at odds with" Flanagan. When Flanagan was criticized for his "glib" remarks "calling for the assassination of WikiLeaks founder Julian Assange", the Conservative party representative said that "Flanagan speaks for himself. He doesn't speak for the government and he hasn't advised the PM for years. I certainly don't share his views."

In his 2010 response to an article in the Literary Review of Canada, Flanagan said that conservatives were winning the war of ideas in Canada. He wrote that, while the Calgary School of political science – "Barry Cooper, Ted Morton, Rainer Knopff and I, along with our historian outrider David Bercuson" – did not cause this transformation, they had, along with their students, "played an honourable part in making it happen." (Note: The school is not an official organization and has no membership list. The Walrus included the names of six people in their 2004 in-depth article on the Calgary School. The four main people associated with the school are Barry F. Cooper, Tom Flanagan, Rainer Knopff, Ted Morton who became University of Calgary colleagues in the early 1980s and are still considered to be members of the Calgary School. David Bercuson was more loosely affiliated with the group. Roger Gibbins, was also mentioned. Bercuson is a history professor and director of the university's Centre for Military and Strategic Studies. Cooper is political science professor and fellow of the Canadian Defence and Foreign Affairs Institute. Flanagan was a professor of political science, senior fellow at the Fraser Institute and former adviser to Conservative Prime Minister, Stephen Harper. Roger Gibbins is a political scientist and was, formerly president of the Canada West Foundation (1999-2012) and political science professor at the University of Calgary. Rainer Knopff is political science professor. In Flanagan's 2010 letter to the 'Literary Review of Canada, he mentions these people, but they are possible former students and have not necessarily self-identified with the Calgary School. These are Stephen Harper, Danielle Smith, Ian Brodie, Ezra Levant, Mark Milke, Marco Navarro, and Mercedes Stephenson. Jason Kenney is not a former student. Harper, is a former Prime Minister of Canada and owner of "Harper and Associates" in downtown Calgary. Smith became premier of Alberta in 2022. Brodie studied at the University of Calgary and was former Chief of Staff to Stephen Harper. Levant is a lawyer, author, founder and former publisher of the Western Standard, hosted The Source daily on Sun News Network. Milke studied at the University of Calgary and is Director of Alberta Policy Studies at the Fraser Institute. Navarro studied at the University of Calgary and is a Director of Research at Frontier Centre for Public Policy, Director at Rights and Democracy, Fellow at The Latin American Research Centre, University of Calgary. Stephenson studied at the University of Calgary and is a reporter for Global News The West Block.)

Tom Flanagan remembered Danielle Smith as was one of his most promising students in his statistics class at the University of Calgary. In a 2009 interview, Flanagan remembered her as one of his best students. Flanagan became Smith's campaign manager in her 2012 Alberta general election campaign, running for the Wildrose Party. He played a "pivotal behind-the-scenes role in transforming his former pupil into premier of Alberta." Smith's Wildrose lost the election to the Progressive Conservatives under Alison Redford.

In 2013, Flanagan was still a political scientist and author who was respected by many. He was a "sought-after commentator in the media with a regular spot on CBC Television, and an effective Conservative political activist who had once served as Prime Minister Stephen Harper's chief of staff." All that ended abruptly in the wake of controversial comments he had made in Lethbridge following his talk on the Indian Act. Flanagan's libertarian response to questions about child pornography met with immediate consequences. He had become a pariah within hours – he was denounced by then-Prime Minister Harper, Danielle Smith, and other political allies. After over four decades with the University of Calgary, he was "trashed". He was fired as a CBC commentator. A chastened Flanagan later said that he had played a role in this brand of negative politics. In a 2014 interview with Margaret Wente, Flanagan said that as an architect of Harper's Conservative party, he was "complicit in the cultivation of a climate of ruthlessness that put the PM into power and has kept him there". In this political culture, "people and principles are expendable" and "dissent is not tolerated". Flanagan said he had to accept his "share of blame". Originally, Flanagan had thought that the "only way to beat the Liberals at their own game" was to be ruthless.

In May 2018, Cooper, Flanagan, Knopff and Morton were awarded the "TaxFighter Award" by the Canadian Taxpayers Federation. In his introduction, Mark Milke described the Calgary School by its four original members, Cooper, Flanagan, Knopff and Morton. Milke described the Calgary School's "driving idea" through the lens of Tom Flanagan's perspective, influenced by the Austrian economist Friedrich Hayek. Hayek said that "spontaneous order arises when people are left to spontaneously order themselves ... We do not require the state to help organize us."

In 2020, Barry Cooper, who founded the climate change denying NGO Friends of Science in 2002, submitted a commissioned report to Alberta Premier Jason Kenney's Public Inquiry into Anti-Alberta Energy Campaigns. In his report, Cooper said "The apocalyptic rhetoric of so much current environmental discourse is unlikely to end anytime soon. The evocation of an apocalypse has been part of Western political symbolism since the book of Daniel in the Hebrew bible." Cooper has been associated with the Calgary School since its inception.

== Other influences at the University of Calgary ==
By 2019, the University of Calgary placed a greater emphasis on indigenous scholarship and education, which is reflected in the appointments of indigenous researchers, as well as the recognition of indigenous politics and law as a research field within the departments of Political Science and Law respectively. Additionally, the Department of Political Science has developed a strong research interest in feminist and gender politics, even considering it a prominent research field. Faculty in the Department of Political Science condemned criticisms by Premier Jason Kenney who said their work aligned with the Alberta New Democratic Party. Trevor Tombe, a prominent member of the Department of Economics faculty supports carbon pricing as an effective method of achieving climate targets. Faculty members in the Department of Economics promote the implementation of a provincial sales tax in Alberta, as a means to prevent drastic austerity policies. The Faculty of Law has also produced two Alberta cabinet ministers under Rachel Notley's New Democratic government, Kathleen Ganley and Irfan Sabir.
