= Grave Error =

2023 book

- Editors: C.P. Champion; Tom Flanagan
- Language: English
- Genre: History
- Publisher: True North and Dorchester Books
- Publication date: 2023
- Publication place: Canada
- Pages: 343
- ISBN: 979-8867599317

Grave Error: How The Media Misled Us (and the Truth about Residential Schools) is a book published in 2023 by C.P. Champion and Tom Flanagan.

The book contains 18 essays by various contributors, and critically examines the narrative surrounding reports of unmarked graves found around Canadian residential schools. The book has been criticized for promoting residential school denialism.

The book reached number one on the Canadian Literature bestseller list from Amazon.

== Contents ==
The book contains a Preface by Conrad Black, an introduction by the editors, eighteen essays authored by various contributors, and a postscript.

The introduction states:

Canada...is already very far down the path not just of accepting, but of legally entrenching, a narrative for which no serious evidence has been proffered...This book is an attempt to appeal for rationality and truth amid a moral panic of stories about Canada that are so implausible that they should not be believed without convincing evidence.

The chapters are as follows:

- In Kamloops, Not One Body Has Been Found
- Graves in the Apple Orchard
- Digging for the Truth about Canada’s Residential School Graves
- Mass Graves and Other Fake Atrocities on the Blue Quills Indian Reserve
- Billy Remembers
- A Media-Fuelled Social Panic Over Unmarked Graves
- Canada’s Descent into Collective Guilt
- The Banality of Genocide, Made in Canada
- We Had a "Knowing": The False Narrative of IRS Burials
- Neither Truth Nor Reconciliation
- Asking for Evidence Now Counts as "Denialism"
- Integration, Forced Assimilation, or Genocide?
- Everybody’s Favourite Dead White Male
- Were the Residential Schools Agents of Genocide?
- Myths About Attendance at Indian Residential Schools
- The Tainted Milk Murder Mystery
- Did Indian Residential Schools Cause Intergenerational Trauma?
- My Life in Two Indian Residential Schools
- Postscript: Reconciliation and Truth

== Reception ==
The book has been widely criticized for promoting residential school denialism.

The Union of British Columbia Indian Chiefs said the book “essentially questions the very existence of residential schools and their well-documented harms against Indigenous peoples.”

The Coast Reporter described the book as a "collection of essays...which accuses the media of perpetuating a false narrative of residential schools and questions the findings of the Truth and Reconciliation Commission".

The Vancouver Sun stated the book "severely downplays the history and harms of residential schools in Canada."

Frontier Centre for Public Policy stated the book "continues the lengthy process of unravelling the falsehoods about residential schools perpetrated against the Canadian people by our elites and telling the much more truthful and balanced story."

== Sequel ==
Dead Wrong: How Canada Got the Residential School Story So Wrong (published late 2025) is the follow-up.
