= Society of Natural Sciences of Navarra Gorosti =

- Founded: 1983
- Founder: Luis Miguel García Bona
- Legal status: Non-profit organization
- Purpose: Promotion of natural sciences
- Headquarters: (Spain) Pamplona, Navarra
- Region served: Spain
- Services: Projects and other activities

Society of Natural Sciences of Navarra Gorosti or simply Society of Natural Sciences Gorosti (Spanish: Sociedad de Ciencias Naturales de Navarra Gorosti; Basque: Gorosti Natur Zientzi Elkartea in Basque Gorosti Natur Zientzi Elkartea) is a non-profit organization in Navarre, Spain, created in 1983.

== Overview ==
This association was founded in October 1983 in Pamplona, under the name Society of Natural Sciences Gorosti. Its registration was made out of cultural and educational interest, with the purpose of studying nature sciences. The association has 300 members. The funding comes from economic contributions from the Government of Navarra, the Environmental Institute of the Pamplona City Council, and various banking institutions (Caja de Ahorros de Navarra, Caja Rural de Navarra, and Caja Laboral Popular).

The Society is located at 34 Calderería Street in Pamplona.

== Activities ==
=== Projects ===
- Conducting activities: Such as campaigns, exhibitions, conferences and workshops, naturalistic itineraries, courses, or other forms of training, etc., related to natural sciences and nature.
- Conducting studies: various themes such as botany, zoology, mycology, prehistory, and environmental legislation.
- Coordinating other actions to analyze and protect Navarre's fauna, flora, soil, and landscape.

=== Publications ===
The Society of Natural Sciences Gorosti carries out various publications (Books, articles, guides, etc.), including journal Gorosti. Notebooks of Natural Sciences of Navarra.

=== Agreements ===
The Society of Natural Sciences Gorosti also signs collaboration agreements with various institutions, such as Valle de Egüés Town Hall.

=== Collaborations ===
The organization also collaborates in the organization and promotion of scientific events or activities of various kinds, such as the Week of Science in Navarra, together with other entities and organizations such as the Pamplona Planetarium, the Club of Friends of Science, the Public University of Navarra, or the Institute of Agrobiotechnology among others.

== Board of Directors ==
- President: Alfredo Barbería Goñi
- Vice President: Puri Mateo Chivite
- Secretary: Santiago Serrano Maya
- Treasurer: Rosario Pastor García
