= Tim Ball =

Canadian public speaker and writer (1938–2022)

- Born: Timothy Francis Ball; 5 November 1938; Chippenham, England
- Died: 24 September 2022 (aged 83)
- Citizenship: Canadian
- Education: University of Winnipeg, University of Manitoba, Queen Mary University of London
- Known for: Opposing mainstream consensus on climate change
- Spouse: Marty Ball
- Awards: Clarence Atchison Award for Excellence in Community Service Clifford J. Robson Memorial Award for Teaching Excellence
- Scientific career
- Fields: Geography, Climatology
- Workplaces: University of Winnipeg
- Thesis: Climatic change in central Canada : a preliminary analysis of weather information from the Hudson's Bay Company Forts at York Factory and Churchill Factory, 1714–1850. (1983)
- Doctoral advisor: B.W. Atkinson
- Military career
- Allegiance: Canada
- Branch: Royal Canadian Air Force
- Service years: 1960–1968
- Website: Official website

Timothy Francis Ball (5 November 1938 – 24 September 2022) was a British-born Canadian public speaker and writer who was a professor in the Department of Geography at the University of Winnipeg from 1971 until his retirement in 1996. Subsequently Ball became active in promoting rejection of the scientific consensus on global warming, giving public talks and writing opinion pieces and letters to the editor for Canadian newspapers.

== Early life ==
Timothy Ball was born on 5 November 1938, in Chippenham England and immigrated to Canada in 1957. He worked in Toronto and Sudbury before enlisting in the Royal Canadian Air Force in 1960. He was trained as an aircraft radio operator and for a time served in search and rescue in northern Canada. It was during his service that Ball first became interested in climate science. After eight and a half years in the Air Force, he left in 1968 and began his college studies.

== Education and professional career ==
Ball received a bachelor's degree with honors in geography from the University of Winnipeg in 1970, followed by an M.A. from the University of Manitoba in 1971 and a PhD in geography with a specific focus on historical climatology from Queen Mary University of London in England in 1983.

Ball became an instructor at the University of Winnipeg in 1971, and a lecturer the following year. He then served in the latter capacity for 10 years. In 1982 he became an assistant professor there, and was promoted to associate professor in 1984 and full professor in 1988. He retired from teaching in 1996.

== Research and books ==
=== Historical climatology and natural history ===
Ball founded the Rupert's Land Research Centre, a historical society dedicated to promoting the history of the area formerly known as Rupert's Land, in 1984. He also served as its director from then until 1996. The society placed a particular emphasis on the use of the Hudson's Bay Company Archives. Ball has published a number of peer-reviewed papers in the field of historical climatology, most of which pertain to reconstructing temperatures in Canada during the past several centuries. In 2003, Ball co-authored a book entitled "Eighteenth-Century Naturalists of Hudson Bay," which was reviewed in the American Indian Quarterly by Theodore Binnema of the University of Northern British Columbia in 2005, as well as by Fred Cooke in the Auk in 2004.

=== Climate and polar bears study ===
In 2007 Ball was one of seven co-authors of a paper arguing that "spring air temperatures around the Hudson Bay basin for the past 70 years (1932–2002) show no significant warming trend," and that, as a result, "the extrapolation of polar bear disappearance is highly premature." The paper was a "Viewpoint" article and was not peer-reviewed. While the paper was cited by Sarah Palin to justify opposition to listing polar bears on the endangered-species list, its findings were contradicted by reports from the U.S. Geological Survey and other independent researchers, who concluded that man-made climate change was likely to lead to major declines in polar-bear populations by 2050. The paper was also criticized by an expert at the National Snow and Ice Data Center, who wrote that it "doesn't measure up scientifically." A subsequent in depth international independent study, Re-Assessment of the Baffin Bay and Kane Basin Polar Bear Subpopulations: Final Report to the Canada-Greenland Joint Commission on Polar Bear determined that while polar bear populations are not declining overall and are increasing significantly in some areas, "If the current trends in sea ice continue it is reasonable to predict further changes in [the Baffin Bay] subpopulation including, ultimately, declines in abundance and vital rates. This warrants caution in both future monitoring and management."

=== Books disputing climate change ===
Tim Ball wrote several books positing a false notion that carbon dioxide is not a greenhouse gas causing warming and advancing a false climate change conspiracy theory.

In his 2016 book Human Caused Global Warming : the Biggest Deception in History Ball tells "the story of how and why the global warming deception was achieved. The world has not warmed for over 20 years, yet carbon dioxide (CO2) levels continue to rise in complete contradiction to what all governments are saying". Ball writes:

The deception is the hypothesis that human production of CO2 is causing global warming. The hypothesis is referred to as Anthropogenic Global Warming (AGW). The agency that carried out the deception was the UN Intergovernmental Panel on Climate Change (IPCC).

Ball introduces his book as "presented in the form of a journalistic investigation answering basic questions, Why, Who, What, Where, When, and How."

Ball's 2014 book The Deliberate Corruption of Climate Science was along the same lines.

Ball was one of several authors of the 2011 book Slaying the Sky Dragon: Death of the Greenhouse Gas Theory.

== Climate change-related activism ==
Ball worked with Friends of Science and Natural Resources Stewardship Project, which oppose the scientific consensus of significant anthropogenic global warming, and is a former research fellow at the Frontier Centre for Public Policy. Ball also rejected the scientific consensus on climate change, claiming that "CO_{2} is not a greenhouse gas that raises global temperature."

Ball rejected the scientific consensus on climate change and stated that he believed global warming is occurring but that human production of carbon dioxide is not the cause. Ball rejected not only CO_{2} greenhouse gas–induced climate change but the existence of the CO_{2} greenhouse effect itself.

Ball told National Geographic that carbon dioxide causing warming was just a hypothesis, but had been treated as fact because it fit a political agenda and the views of the environmentalists. He reiterated the view that man-made global warming was fabricated by the environmental movement, particularly Environment Canada, in a presentation he gave in June 2006 to the Comox Valley Probus Club.

Ball was also a frequent guest on Coast to Coast AM, an alternative media radio show. On 21 July 2011, while a guest on the show, he stated: "To suggest that CO_{2}'s a pollutant when it's an extremely important gas in the atmosphere for all plant life and therefore for the oxygen that's produced, is just nonsense." He is also one of the signatories of the Manhattan Declaration on Climate Change. Ball also, along with Tom Harris, argued that the National Climatic Data Center misleads the public by announcing premature results from their temperature datasets based on incomplete data, and then quietly updating the data when they gain access to all of it, usually diminishing the warming trend in doing so. He also wrote about ocean acidification from a similarly dismissive point of view, arguing that "Even if CO_{2} increases to 560 ppm by 2050, as the IPCC predict, this would only result in a 0.2 unit reduction of pH. This is still within the error of the estimate of global average [which is 0.3 units]." Ball also said that since he became a vocal opponent of the consensus position on global warming, he received five death threats.

Michael E. Mann called Ball "perhaps the most prominent climate change denier in Canada." The Frontier Centre for Public Policy, a Canadian think tank, states that Ball disputed anthropogenic global warming since the mid-1990s, and asserted that global warming is due to natural variations. Ball spoke twice at The Heartland Institute's International Conference on Climate Change, where he was presented as a former climatology professor at the University of Winnipeg. However, critics pointed out that Ball was a professor of geography, not climatology, and that the University of Winnipeg never had a climatology department. Ball replied that the climate program at The University of Winnipeg was part of the geography department in the early 1980s. He also asserted that websites such as DeSmogBlog made false charges about his credentials and professional qualifications.

From 2002 to 2007, Ball wrote 39 opinion pieces and 32 letters to the editor in 24 different Canadian newspapers, and from 2002 to 2012, he gave over 600 public talks about global warming and various environmental issues. Friends of Science maintains a "Climate Digest" of articles written by Ball in 2008–09.

In 2007 Ball appeared on The Great Global Warming Swindle, an hour and a quarter-long British television documentary that aired on Channel 4 and that was described as a "deceptive and propagandist portrayal of the science of global warming". Also in 2007, he participated in Exposed: The Climate of Fear, a special presentation of the Glenn Beck Program, with Patrick Michaels, John Christy, and other climate deniers. In 2010, he appeared on the Michael Coren Show.

== Controversies and lawsuits ==
Ball claimed, in an article written for the Calgary Herald, that he was the first person to receive a PhD in climatology in Canada, and that he had been a professor for 28 years, claims he also made in a letter to then-prime minister of Canada, Paul Martin. Dan Johnson, a professor of environmental science at the University of Lethbridge, countered his claim on 23 April 2006, in a letter to the Herald stating that when Ball received his PhD in 1983, "Canada already had PhDs in climatology," and that Ball had only been a professor for eight years, rather than 28 as he had claimed. Johnson, however, counted only Ball's years as a full professor. In the letter, Johnson also wrote that Ball "did not show any evidence of research regarding climate and atmosphere," which Ball later admitted.

In response, Ball filed a lawsuit against Johnson. Johnson's statement of defence was provided by the Calgary Herald. In the ensuing court case, Ball acknowledged that he had only been a tenured professor for eight years, and that his doctorate was not in climatology but rather in the broader discipline of geography, and subsequently withdrew the lawsuit on 8 June 2007.

In 2011 climate scientist Andrew J. Weaver sued Ball over an article Ball wrote for the Canada Free Press which was later retracted. In the article, Ball described Weaver as lacking a basic understanding of climate science and stated, incorrectly, that Weaver would not be involved in the production of the IPCC's next report because he had concerns about its credibility. Andrew Weaver's defamation suit against Ball was dismissed in 2018. The judge noted that Ball's words "lack a sufficient air of credibility to make them believable and therefore potentially defamatory" and concluded that the “article is poorly written and does not advance credible arguments in favour of Dr. Ball’s theory about the corruption of climate science. Simply put, a reasonably thoughtful and informed person who reads the article is unlikely to place any stock in Dr. Ball’s views...". The British Columbia Court of Appeal in April 2020 reversed the dismissal. Writing that Ball's statements "meet the classic test for defamation," it sent the case back to the trial judge to decide the amount of damages and whether the article was fair comment.

The Frontier Centre for Public Policy's web site published a February 2011 interview, in which Ball told an anonymous interviewer that Michael E. Mann, director of the Earth System Science Center at Pennsylvania State University, "should be in the State Pen, not Penn State". This referred to Mann's role in the Climatic Research Unit email controversy. Mann then sued Ball and Frontier Centre for libel, and stated that he was seeking punitive damages and for the article to be removed from the web site.

On 7 June 2019, the Frontier Centre For Public Policy published a retraction and apology and settled their part of the case with Mann. On 21 March 2019, Tim Ball had applied to the court to dismiss the action for delay. This request was granted at a hearing on 22 August 2019, and court costs were awarded to Ball. The actual defamation claims were not judged, but instead the case was dismissed due to delay by Mann's legal team.

== Funding sources ==
Some have linked Ball's activism to funding from the fossil fuel industry, especially through the organization Friends of Science, whose scientific advisory board he sat upon. For example, Peter Gorrie said in the Toronto Star that Friends of Science received a third of its funding from the oil industry. Bankruptcy disclosures made by Peabody Energy, a large US coal company, showed that Friends of Science received funding from the company. Ball himself has publicly denied these claims, as has his wife, Marty Ball.

== Books ==
- Ball, Tim (2016). Human caused global warming : the biggest deception in history. Tellwell Talent. ISBN 9781773021300.
- Ball, Tim (2014). The deliberate corruption of climate science. Stairway Press. ISBN 9780988877740.
- Ball, Tim; Siddons, Alan; Olson, Joseph A.; et al. (2011). Slaying the sky dragon : death of the greenhouse gas theory. Stairway Press. ISBN 9780982773413.
- Houston, Stuart; Ball, Tim; Houston, Mary (2003). Eighteenth-Century Naturalists of Hudson Bay. McGill-Queen's Native and Northern. Vol. 34. McGill-Queen's University Press. ISBN 9780773522855.
