= Tom Flanagan (political scientist) =

Canadian political scientist and advisor (born 1944)

Tom Flanagan CM FRSC
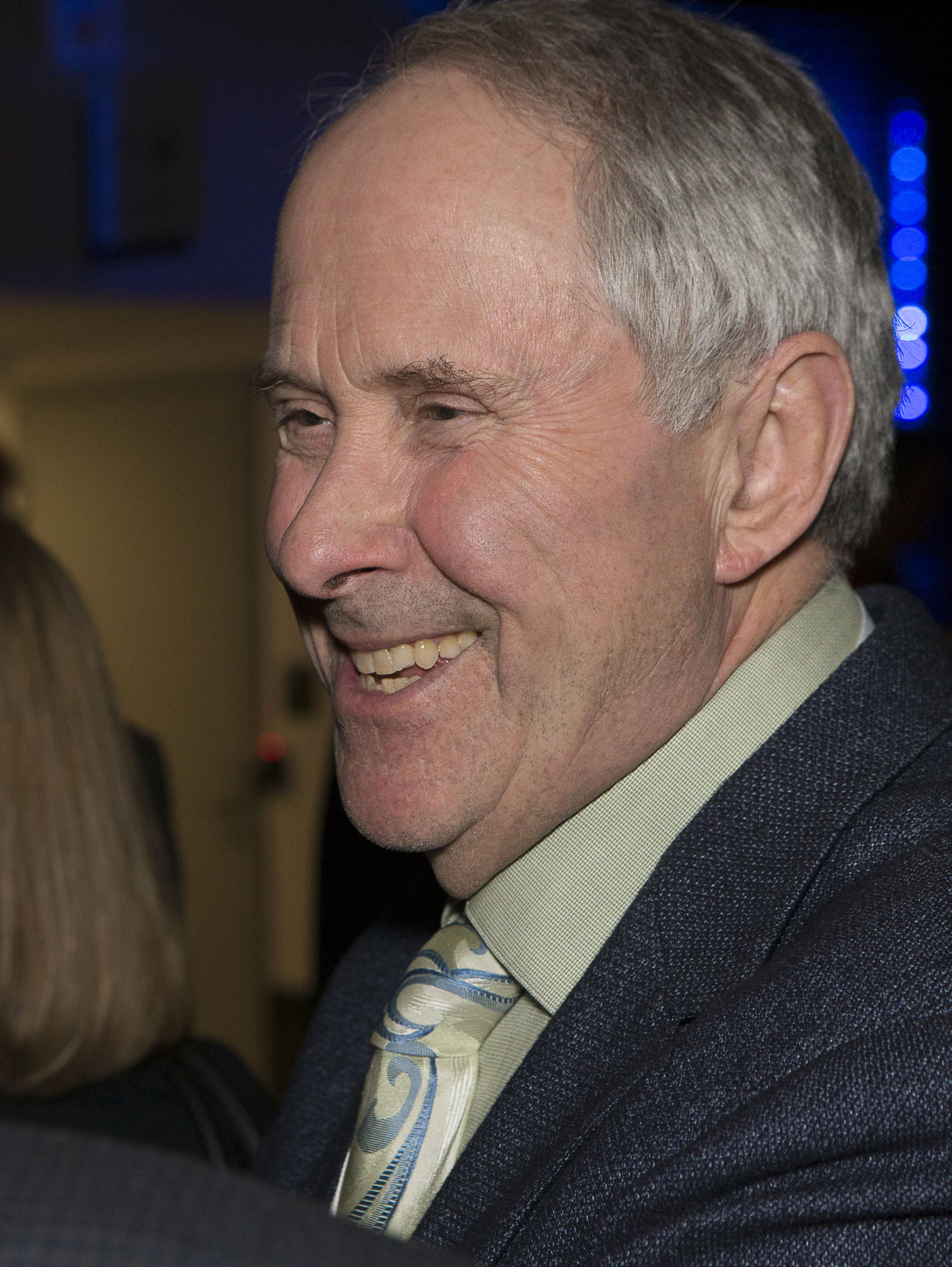
- Flanagan in 2014
- Born: Thomas Eugene Flanagan; 5 March 1944 (age 82); Ottawa, Illinois, U.S.
- Occupations: Academic; political advisor
- Political party: Reform Party of Canada (1990–?); Canadian Alliance (bef. 2002 – ?); Conservative Party of Canada (since c. 2003); Wildrose Party

Academic background
- Education: University of Notre Dame; Duke University
- Influences: Friedrich Hayek; Eric Voegelin

Academic work
- Discipline: Political science
- School or tradition: Calgary School
- Institutions: University of Calgary

Thomas Eugene Flanagan CM FRSC (born 5 March 1944) is an American-born Canadian author, conservative political activist, and former political science professor at the University of Calgary. He also served as an advisor to Canadian prime minister Stephen Harper until 2004.

Flanagan has focused on challenging certain historical interpretations of Native and Métis history. In connection with his multi-year research and publications on Louis Riel, Flanagan published a reinterpretation of the North-West Rebellion, defending the federal government's response to Métis land claims. He began publishing works on Riel—leader of the 1885 North-West Resistance—in the 1970s, which evolved into a multi-year 'Louis Riel Project' that he coordinated. During the 2012 provincial elections he served as the campaign manager of the Wildrose Party, an Alberta libertarian/conservative provincial party.

As part of his political activism, Flanagan began to write as a columnist in 1997 in The Globe and Mail, National Post, Calgary Herald, Ottawa Citizen, Maclean's, and Time. He regularly made appearances on Canadian television and radio as a commentator until January 2013, when he began a "research and scholarship leave" from the University of Calgary prior to his retirement.

== Education and teaching ==
Flanagan was born on 5 March 1944 in Ottawa, Illinois, US. He earned a Bachelor of Arts degree at the University of Notre Dame in Indiana. Studying political science under John Hallowell, Flanagan earned a Master of Arts degree in 1967 and a Doctor of Philosophy degree in 1970, both at Duke University in North Carolina. He also studied at the Free University of Berlin.

Flanagan began teaching at the University of Calgary in 1968 and co-authored an introductory Canadian politics textbook. He served as Head of the Political Science Department and Assistant to the President of the University. He retired on 30 June 2013.

Since the 1970s Flanagan published numerous scholarly studies "debunking the heroism of Métis icon Louis Riel, arguing against native land claims, and calling for an end to aboriginal rights."

Flanagan developed his concept of aboriginal orthodoxy in which he argued against aboriginal collective rights. He claimed that section 35 of the Constitution Act, 1982, which stated that "The existing aboriginal and treaty rights of the aboriginal peoples of Canada are hereby recognized and affirmed" resulted in thousands of cases involving aboriginal and treaty rights – indeed thousands of cases including residential school claims. Flanagan decried the increased influence of the courts and "[t]he sheer volume of these cases" which threaten "to take policy-making out of the hands of elected representatives and put it into the hands of a small cadre of judges, lawyers, law professors, and expert witnesses." Although Flanagan admits that he has profited as expert witness, he also believes that "[this] flood of litigation is detrimental to democracy."

== Research and scholarship ==
Flanagan has widely published in areas such as political science, public policy, political theory and aboriginal land claims, from a libertarian perspective.

=== Louis Riel ===
Flanagan has written about his change of views regarding Métis leader Louis Riel:

I had earlier accepted that the Métis had serious unresolved grievances; the government of Canada never gave a satisfactory response to the complaints; that Riel resorted to violence only after legal means of action had failed; and that he received a trial of questionable validity before being executed by vengeful government. As I sifted the evidence this became less and less convincing to me until I concluded that the opposite was closer to the truth: that the Métis grievances were at least partly of their own making; that the government was on the verge of resolving them when the Rebellion broke out; that Riel's resort to arms could not be explained by the failure of constitutional agitation and that he received a surprisingly fair trial.

Flanagan developed a theory that Riel could be understood as a millenarian prophet, not just as a political figure. He translated and edited Riel's diaries and co-edited a volume of Riel's youthful poetry which won the 1978 Prix Champlain. He also published the book Louis 'David' Riel: 'Prophet of the New World', which won the Canadian Biography Award from the University of British Columbia.

Flanagan later participated in the "Louis Riel Project", collecting and publishing all of Riel's writings, which have been dispersed among more than 40 archives in Canada and the United States. The University of Alberta Press published the work in 1985 to commemorate the centennial of the North-West Rebellion. In connection with this work, Flanagan also published a reinterpretation of the North-West Rebellion, highlighting how the government had responded to Métis land claims.

=== Litigation over Métis claims ===
Flanagan was retained by the federal Department of Justice in litigation over Métis claims in Manitoba. His 1991 book Metis Lands in Manitoba, won the 1992 Margaret McDonald/McWilliams Medal, awarded by the Manitoba Historical Society for the best book of the year on Manitoba history.

=== First Nations? Second Thoughts ===
Flanagan later published the controversial First Nations? Second Thoughts, which critiqued the report of the Royal Commission on Aboriginal Peoples. The book received the Donner Prize for the best book of the year on Canadian public policy in 2000, (Note: Harper and Flanagan (Winter 1996-1997) accredited the Donner Canadian Foundation, a newly formed foundation "with real money to spend" that promoted Canadian conservatism, with the "acceleration of the growth of a conservative intellectual network" along with the National Citizens' Coalition, the Fraser Institute, Alberta Report and others (Harper and Flanagan 2006-2007).") and the Donald Smiley Prize from the Canadian Political Science Association for the best book on Canadian government and politics.

In his 2002 review, Yale D. Belanger, compared Alan Cairn's publication entitled Citizens Plus with Flanagan's First Nations? Second Thoughts. He concluded that the ideas in First Nations? Second Thoughts should be made publicly available and read as a companion piece with Cairn's Citizens Plus. The books were written for very different audiences: Flanagan wrote First Nations? Second Thoughts (2000) for the lay reader while Cairns wrote for an informed academic audience. Belanger questioned why Flanagan as a professional academic did not access more robust peer-reviewed scholarly resources regarding analysis and statistics, preferring instead to make extensive use of newspaper clippings from the Calgary Herald, the National Post, and The Globe and Mail and the conservative magazine the Alberta Report. Flanagan did not visit any First Nation communities to research the publication nor did he quote any Aboriginal leader in support land privatization in exchange for the end of the reserve system (Belanger 2002:107). Belanger described Flanagan's tone as "distasteful", "militant", and "sensationalist." He claimed he echoed "the assimilation rhetoric of 19th century policy makers and politicians" which perpetuates a stereotyped image of First Nations as "uncivilized" and "unwilling to shake the social pathologies he suggests proliferate all reserve communities." But he felt that readers would have a more holistic understanding of the complexities of the debate by reading both books.

Pamela Palmater, a Mi'kmaq lawyer who holds a new chair in indigenous governance at Toronto Metropolitan University, argued in her review that First Nations? Second Thoughts provides a summary of Flanagan's convictions that "since First Nations in Canada are uncivilized and their governments produce 'wasteful, destructive, familistic factionalism,' they should not be entitled to self-governing powers, special tax exemptions or federal funding, but should be assimilated and their reserves divided up into parcels of individually owned, 'fee simple' lands available for sale to non-aboriginal people and corporations."

In order to become self-supporting and get beyond the social pathologies that are ruining their communities, aboriginal people need to acquire the skills and attitudes that bring success in a liberal society, political democracy, and market economy. Call it assimilation, call it integration, call it adaptation, call it whatever you want: it has to happen.

— Flanagan, 2000. First Nations? Second Thoughts p.195)

According to Suzanne Methot's review of the book, Flanagan claimed that "European civilization was several thousand years more advanced than the aboriginal cultures of North America" and colonization was therefore "inevitable" and "justifiable."

Flanagan wrote a book on property rights in 1979, a book on game theory in 1988, and another about conservative Canadian political parties in 1995. His books on Preston Manning and the Reform Party, and Stephen Harper and the Conservative Party, were based on his experiences as political adviser and campaign manager (discussed below).

In 1996, Flanagan was elected a fellow of the Royal Society of Canada (Academy II). The citation mentioned his contribution to the study of Louis Riel and the Métis, Western Canadian history, and Canadian political parties.

== Beyond the Indian Act ==
In their 2010 publication, Beyond the Indian Act: Restoring Aboriginal Property Rights, co-authors Thomas Flanagan, Christopher Alcantara and André Le Dressay, (Note: André LeDressay, who completed his PhD in economics at Simon Fraser University in 1996, is managing director of Fiscal Realities Economists managing director and Director of Thompson Rivers University's Tulo Centre of Indigenous Economics in Kamloops, British Columbia.) introduced the First Nations Property Ownership Initiative (FNPOI). The book, with a foreword by C.T. (Manny) Jules, was a finalist for the Donner Prize. According to an 28 August 2016 article by Sasha Boutilier in Policy Options, they misrepresented the FNPOI in Canada, which Boutilier described as a "proposed piece of opt-in legislation that would have allowed First Nations to grant fee-simple interests to First Nations members". Boutilier said that their criticisms of the First Nations Land Management Act (FNLMA) which he calls a "quiet success", are "quite simply inaccurate", and that the authors, while acknowledging the FNLMA’s "effectiveness in reducing transaction costs", would leave "each First Nation on its own to develop its own system of property rights and failed "to provide technical assistance in the form of model land codes and zoning regulations." Boutlier says that these "criticisms ignore the First Nations Lands Advisory Board, in existence prior to 1996, and the First Nations Land Management Resource Centre, operating since 1999 and incorporated in 2004, which provide exactly the support Flanagan and his co-authors say is lacking. Indeed, the 1996 Framework Agreement specifically states that the role of the Lands Advisory Board and the Resource Centre is “developing model land codes, laws and land management systems” as well as “assisting First Nation[s] in developing and implementing” such laws and systems."

== Role as historical consultant and expert witness ==
In 1986 Flanagan became the historical consultant and primary expert witness for the Federal Department of Justice in the Manitoba Métis Federation v Canada case (Flanagan, Metis Lands vii). He criticized the recognition of the Indian title of the Métis (1885 Reconsidered) and of the "Métis as an Aboriginal people in the Constitution Act, 1982 (Case Against; Metis Rights) and traced the original evolution of what can be called the 'doctrine of the derivative aboriginal rights' (History)8. Among other things, the Calgary School political scientist has asserted that, during the Resistance in 1869-70, not only did the Métis "never describe themselves as an aboriginal people with special land rights" (Blais 160) nor demand "special treatment as an Aboriginal people" (History 73) but that there "was never a demand for special treatment of the Métis as a group" (Case against 316; Metis Rights 231), nor for a land grant or anything like it" (Reconsidered 2nd ed. 65) (O'Toole 2010:140)."

Substantial grants of land provided to the Metis by the Manitoba Act were rapidly transferred from Metis to immigrants from Ontario who had arrived in large numbers. New research in the 1970s and 1980s shifted the blame to the government's lack of administration of the land grants. Flanagan and Ens (1996) argued that the government acted appropriately and that the Metis had gained financially.

The Manitoba Métis Federation has been in and out of provincial and federal courts for decades in a high-stakes land-claims negotiation. The case involves Prime Minister John A. Macdonald and Louis Riel and an unfulfilled promise of land for the Métis people. Manitoba Métis Federation v Canada & Manitoba court case was argued before the Supreme Court of Canada in 2012. In 2012 Tom Berger, the indigenous rights lawyer represented the Manitoba Métis Federation in the Supreme Court (SCC Case Information: #33880 Manitoba Métis Federation Inc., et al. v. Attorney General of Canada, et al.) claiming that the federal government never "lived up to the 1870 deal that settled the Red River Rebellion, fought by Métis struggling to hold on to their land in the face of growing white settlement." "A Métis win would probably lead to high-stakes land-claim negotiations – and fulfil a prophecy made by Métis leader Louis Riel more than a century ago." (Note: In 2012 Tom Berger, the renowned aboriginal rights lawyer represented the Manitoba Métis Federation in the Supreme Court claiming that the federal government never "lived up to the 1870 deal that settled the Red River Rebellion, fought by Métis struggling to hold on to their land in the face of growing white settlement." "A Métis win would probably lead to high-stakes land-claim negotiations – and fulfil a prophesy made by Métis leader Louis Riel more than a century ago." White settlers from Ontario and the United States were pouring into what is now Manitoba, alarming Métis who had lived and farmed there for generations. In an attempt to assert control, Mr. Riel declared a provisional Métis government in 1870 to negotiate with Ottawa – a government backed by armed Métis insurgents. In response, the federal government passed the Manitoba Act, which carved the province out of the sprawling region called the Northwest Territories and established Canadian dominion. The act promised 5,565 square kilometres of land would be set aside for the 7,000 children of the Red River Métis.)

In 1976 Flanagan published The Diaries of Louis Riel. He was one of three Louis Riel biographers, along with Gilles Martel and Glen Campbell who collected and published Riel's poetry under the title Poésies de Jeunesse in 1977. Flanagan became the coordinator for a multi-year Louis Riel Project. In 1979 he published Louis "David" Riel: Prophet of the New World. In 1983 he published Riel and the Rebellion. In 1985 he co-edited The Collected Writings of Louis Riel/Les Ecrits complet de Louis Riel Flanagan's research on Louis Riel situated him at the apex of debates on Métis rights and land claims. The 1970s saw a new age of land claims negotiations that would change the relationships between First Nations, Inuit and Métis of Canada. In 1973 Canadian law acknowledged that aboriginal title to land existed prior to the colonization of the continent Calder case (1973) (Note: Although Chief Calder of the Nisga'a natives of northwestern BC lost their Supreme Court case in 1973, it was the first time that Canadian law acknowledged that aboriginal title to land existed prior to the colonization of the continent and was not merely derived from statutory law. The decision led to federal willingness to negotiate native land claims.) It is not surprising then that there was a "virtual "explosion in Métis scholarship" that emerged in the 1970s, to determine the causes for the large scale migration of Métis in Manitoba. "With native political organizations and the governments of Canada and Manitoba embroiled in an on-going court battle, various scholars have received generous financial support to investigate Métis land claims in Manitoba." Flanagan, acting as "historical consultant for the Federal Department of Justice" argued that the "federal government fulfilled the land provisions of the Manitoba Act." Donald Sprague, a "historian retained by the Manitoba Métis Federation to undertake research into Métis land claims, argues that through a process of formal and informal discouragement, the Métis were victims of a deliberate conspiracy in which John A. Macdonald and the Canadian government successfully kept them from obtaining title to the land they were to receive under terms of the Manitoba Act of 1870."

=== Witness ===
Flanagan has served as a witness for Alberta, Manitoba, and Canada in litigation involving native rights and land claims, providing testimony about the Numbered Treaties and the administration of federal programs for Métis and Indians in Western Canada. He has since stated that he will no longer be serving in this capacity for ethical reasons.

The Blais decision, as well as the later Manitoba Metis Federation case, upheld the efficacy of the nineteenth-century distribution of land and scrip in extinguishing Métis land rights in Manitoba., but the decision was overturned on appeal to the Supreme Court of Canada.

Benoit established that Treaty Eight did not grant immunity from taxation to Indians living off reserve.

In Victor Buffalo, the Samson Cree band, located near Hobbema, Alberta, unsuccessfully challenged the federal government's implementation of Treaty Six.

Flanagan was also a witness for the University of Alberta in the Dickason case in which the Supreme Court of Canada ultimately upheld the validity of mandatory retirement for university professors.

== Views ==
Flanagan adopts a libertarian point of view and defends personal freedom, particularly in academia. He self-describes as a Hayekian and was considered among the most conservative members of the Reform Party in 1998.

=== Superiority of Western civilization ===
Flanagan adopts the philosophical analysis of John Locke and Emer de Vattel that European colonization of North America by Western civilization was justifiable and inevitable. (Note: John Locke, the Father of Classical Liberalism,(Locke, John. A Letter Concerning Toleration Routledge, New York, 1991. p. 5 (Introduction))(Delaney, Tim. The march of unreason: science, democracy, and the new fundamentalism Oxford University Press, New York, 2005. p. 18) (Godwin, Kenneth et al. School choice tradeoffs: liberty, equity, and diversity University of Texas Press, Austin, 2002. p. 12). Locke's contributions to classical republicanism and liberal theory are reflected in the United States Declaration of Independence(Becker, Carl Lotus. The Declaration of Independence: A Study in the History of Political Ideas Harcourt, Brace, 1922. p. 27)) He asserts that "European civilization was several thousand years more advanced than the Aboriginal cultures of North America both in technology and social organization" (Flanagan 2000:6).

=== Wikileaks ===
In 2010, Flanagan made controversial comments, later retracted, advocating the assassination of WikiLeaks founder Julian Assange. While appearing on the CBC television program "Power & Politics", he called for WikiLeaks founder Julian Assange to be killed. "I think Assange should be assassinated," Flanagan stated, before noting to host Evan Solomon, "I'm feeling pretty manly today." Flanagan subsequently retracted his call for the death of Assange while reiterating his opposition to WikiLeaks. Dimitri Soudas, spokesman to Prime Minister Stephen Harper, decried Flanagan's comments and said the former Tory strategist "should be charged with incitement to commit murder." The call for prosecution was joined by both Assange and Vancouver attorney Gail Davidson, who filed a police complaint against Flanagan. Ralph Goodale, deputy leader of the Liberal Party in the House of Commons, called Flanagan's remarks "clearly contrary to the Canadian Charter of Rights and Freedoms." Flanagan apologized, acknowledging that his words were "glib and thoughtless."

=== Child pornography ===
In November 2009, Flanagan was attending a lecture on Canadian election campaigning at the University of Manitoba. He was asked about Stockwell Day's claim that a lawyer that defends a person against child pornography charges is defending the legitimacy of child pornography. Flanagan responded, then made a "side-bar" comment: "But that's actually another interesting debate or seminar: what's wrong with child pornography, in the sense that they're just pictures?" Flanagan says no one complained or criticized his comment, and maintains that he used the phrase "just pictures" to shock students into questioning pre-held ideas, which is the job of a teacher. The University of Manitoba Aboriginal Students' Association wrote a letter of complaint to the head of the political studies department, George MacLean, but Flanagan's comments did not receive widespread attention.

On 27 February 2013, Flanagan was invited to give a speech on whether it was time to repeal the Indian Act to a group of students at the University of Lethbridge. Flanagan was warned that members of Idle No More were planning on attending and disrupting the speech. Flanagan learned after the event that the Idle No More protesters had organized the event with the intent of creating a "Gotcha!" moment and denouncing Flanagan's views on aboriginals. In fact, the video of Flanagan's comments distinctly includes the protester exclaiming "Gotcha Tom!" as Flanagan responded.

One of the protesters, "Levi Little Moustache," stood and quoted Flanagan's 2009 comments on child pornography. Flanagan responded that "I certainly have no sympathy for child molesters, but I do have some grave doubts about putting people in jail because of their taste in pictures. I don't look at these pictures." A video of the remarks was posted to YouTube overnight and his remarks proved controversial. Danielle Smith, who was mentored by Flanagan, and served as Wildrose Party leader in 2009, cut her ties with him saying "there is no language strong enough to condemn [his] comments". Andrew McDougall (the Director of Communications for the Prime Minister of Canada) considered them to be "repugnant, ignorant, and appalling." CBC News immediately announced that, "In light of recent remarks made by Tom Flanagan at the University of Lethbridge, CBC News has taken the decision to end our association with him as a commentator on Power and Politics. While we support and encourage free speech across the country and a diverse range of voices, we believe Mr Flanagan's comments to have crossed the line and impacted his credibility as a commentator for us (McGuire February 28, 2013)".

Flanagan subsequently apologized for his remarks, stating that his words were "badly chosen". On 5 March 2013 Flanagan, in an interview with The Agenda talk show host Steve Paikin, Flanagan defended his position, and explains that he was cut off and unable to explain fully his position. He also states he was posing a question to provoke thought, as he would have done in his role as a professor. In his book Persona Non Grata, Flanagan explains that his remarks were taken as if he was in favour of child pornography or supportive of child molesters. In fact, he was intending to question whether mandatory jail time for simple possession of child pornography was an appropriate punishment.

== Affiliations ==
Flanagan is often described as a member of the Calgary School, which includes a group of conservatively inclined professors at the University of Calgary, such as Barry F. Cooper, F.L.(Ted) Morton, Rainer Knopff and history professor David Bercuson who are strongly committed to strategic and direct influence on public affairs with a long-term vision. (Note: "There are tensions between the socially conservative and economically conservative factions within the school. Bercuson publicly criticized Morton's social policies, saying "[they] were hard to stomach for a libertarian." (McLean, Archie. "Morton would use Alberta as his 'guinea pig': Social, religious views will drive policy, expert says", Edmonton Journal, 2 December 2006.)Such division brings into question whether its members reflect a coherent "school" of thought (Wikipedia article on Calgary School).")

By 1998, the Center for Strategic and International Studies (CSIS), a public policy research institution based in Washington, DC, had already observed the ascendancy of the role of Calgary-based academics on Canadian public policy, specifically the Calgary School of political science (Rovinsky 1998:10).

In The Court Party, Knopff and Morton took on judicial activism. Cooper and Bercuson's Deconfederation undermined the Meech Lake agenda of endless concessions to Quebec. In First Nations? Second Thoughts, I stood up against the juggernaut of the Royal Commission on Aboriginal Peoples. All these books were widely discussed in the media and have had some impact on the course of public affairs.

— Tom Flanagan, Advice to progressives from the Calgary School, Literary Review of Canada

He is also a senior fellow of the conservative think tank the Fraser Institute.

== Political influence ==
In a jocular (Note: Flanagan has been described as "colourful", "provocative", "no stranger to controversy" with an "off-the-cuff sense of humour" who sometimes talks "tongue-in-cheek".(CBC 2010)) letter written to the Literary Review of Canada (2010–12), Flanagan commented that, "Sylvia Bashevkin's plaintive cri de coeur confirmed my belief that conservatives are winning the war of ideas in Canada. The Calgary School of political science – Barry Cooper, Ted Morton, Rainer Knopff and I, along with our historian outrider David Bercuson – did not cause this transformation, but we and our students have played an honourable part in making it happen."

=== Reform Party of Canada ===
Flanagan joined the right-wing populist Reform Party of Canada in 1990 and began working there in 1991 as director of policy research. Flanagan, who was among the most conservative of Preston Manning's advisers, was fired before the 1993 federal election. (Note: Flanagan supported conservative economic and social policies which were popular in the west but not elsewhere in Canada at that time. Manning was transforming the party into a broader center-right party (Rovinsky 1998:11).)

=== Tom Flanagan and Stephen Harper ===
Flanagan and Stephen Harper began publishing together in 1996-7 with "Canadian conservatism is at its strongest level in many years". Their controversial opinion piece entitled "Our Benign Dictatorship: Canada's system of one-party-plus rule has stunted democracy. Two prominent conservatives present the case for more representative government" which argued that the Liberal Party only retained power through a dysfunctional political system and a divided opposition. Harper and Flanagan argued that national conservative governments between 1917 and 1993 were founded on temporary alliances between Western populists and Quebec nationalists, and were unable to govern because of their fundamental contradictions. The authors called for an alliance of Canada's conservative parties, and suggested that meaningful political change might require electoral reforms such as proportional representation. "Our Benign Dictatorship" also commended Conrad Black's purchase of the Southam newspaper chain, arguing that his stewardship would provide for a "pluralistic" editorial view to counter the "monolithically liberal and feminist" approach of the previous management.

Flanagan and Harper co-authored their last article in 2001. Flanagan was a key player in Stephen Harper's political rise to Prime Minister of Canada. In 2001, Flanagan helped Harper seek the leadership of the Canadian Alliance. Flanagan managed Harper's leadership campaign, and Harper went on to win the Alliance leadership in March 2002. Flanagan then served for one year as chief of staff to Harper, who was then the Leader of the Opposition. Flanagan managed his leadership campaigns for the Canadian Alliance (2002) and the Conservative Party of Canada (2004). He also managed the Conservative Party's national election campaign in 2004. He was the Senior Communications Adviser for the Conservatives successful 2005–2006 election campaign.

In 2007 Flanagan published his book entitled Harper's Team: Behind the Scenes in the Conservative Rise to Power.

By 2010 Government House Leader John Baird announced during question period in the House of Commons that "Mr. Flanagan speaks for himself ... He doesn't speak for the government and he hasn't advised the Prime Minister Office Stephen Harper for years. I certainly don't share his views."

=== Accusation of corruption ===
In 2008, Flanagan and Doug Finley were accused by Dona Cadman of offering her late husband, MP Chuck Cadman, a million-dollar life insurance policy (on behalf of the Conservative Party of Canada) in exchange for his vote against the Liberal budget in May 2005. This vote would have caused the government to fall and triggered an election. The Royal Canadian Mounted Police found no evidence to support criminal charges.

=== Civitas ===
Flanagan was a founding member and president of the Canadian conservative society , founded in 1996 by William Gairdner, and described the society's raison d'être this way:

For those of you who are not yet familiar with Civitas, it grows out of Canadians' desire to take up one of the great challenges of Western civilization: how to reconcile our desire for individual freedom with the need for social order. Every society and age throws up new challenges requiring us to balance these precious values. As a "society where ideas meet," Civitas is an organization dedicated to promoting and nurturing that conversation in Canada today. We bring together people with an interest in conservative, classical liberal and libertarian ideas and allow them to engage with some of the world's finest minds who are grappling with these questions.

— Brian Lee Crowley, Civitas Regional Dinner, Halifax, 27 October 2005

His critics claimed he had too much power in the shadows, advising Canadian politicians, to whittle "aboriginal claims on land and self-determination down to individual property rights and municipal self-government."

=== Society for Academic Freedom and Scholarship ===
Flanagan has served on the board of directors of the Society for Academic Freedom and Scholarship since 2004.

== Selected publications ==
=== Books ===
- Champion, CP; Flanagan, Tom (2023). Grave Error: How The Media Misled Us (and the Truth about Residential Schools). True North. ISBN 979-8867599317.
- Flanagan, Tom; Mintz, Jack; Morton, Ted (2020). Moment of Truth: How to Think About Alberta's Future. Sutherland House. ISBN 978-1989555361.
- First Nations? Second Thoughts (3rd ed.). McGill-Queen's University Press. 2019. ISBN 978-0773558533.
- Persona Non Grata: The Death of Free Speech in the Internet Age. Signal Books. 2014. ISBN 978-0771030536.
- Winning Power: Canadian Campaigning in the Twenty-First Century. Montreal and Kingston: McGill-Queen's University Press. 2014. ISBN 978-0773543317.
- Flanagan, Tom; Alcantara, Christopher; Le Dressay, André (2011). Beyond the Indian Act: Restoring Aboriginal Property Rights (2nd ed.). McGill-Queen's University Press. ISBN 978-0773539211.
- Flanagan, Tom; Alcantara, Christopher; Le Dressay, André (2010). Beyond the Indian Act: Restoring Aboriginal Property Rights (1st ed.). McGill-Queen's University Press. ISBN 978-0773536869.
- Mark O. Dickerson; Thomas Flanagan; Brenda O'Neill (2009). An Introduction to government and politics: A Conceptual Approach (8 ed.). Toronto: Nelson. ISBN 9780176500429.
- Harper's Team: Behind the Scenes in the Conservative Rise to Power (2nd ed.). McGill-Queen's University Press. 2009. ISBN 978-0773535459.
- Waiting for the Wave: The Reform Party and the Conservative Movement (Illustrated ed.). Mcgill-Queens University Press. 2009. ISBN 978-0773535466.
- First Nations? Second Thoughts (2nd ed.). McGill-Queen's University Press. 2008. ISBN 978-0773534445.
- Harper's Team: Behind the Scenes in the Conservative Rise to Power (1st ed.). Montreal and Kingston: McGill-Queen's University Press. 2007. ISBN 978-0773532984.
- Flanagan, Thomas; Anderson, Terry L.; Benson, Bruce (2006). Self-Determination: The Other Path for Native Americans. Stanford: Stanford University Press. p. 346.
- Flanagan, Thomas; Dickerson, Mark (2005). An Introduction to Government and Politics: A Conceptual Approach (7 ed.). Toronto: Thomson Nelson. p. 304.
- Premieres Nations? Second Regards. Montreal and Kingston: McGill-Queen's University Press. 2002. p. 304. ISBN 978-2894483381.
- First Nations? Second Thoughts. Montreal and Kingston: McGill-Queen's University Press. 2000.
- Waiting for the Wave: The Reform Party and Preston Manning. Toronto: Stoddart Publishing. 1995. pp. 245. ISBN 0-7737-2862-7.
- Métis Lands in Manitoba. Calgary: University of Calgary Press. 1991. ISBN 978-0919813878.
- George G.F. Stanley; Raymond J.A. Huel; Gilles Martel; Thomas Flanagan; Glen Campbell, eds. (1985). The Collected Writings of Louis Riel/Les Ecrits complet de Louis Riel. Calgary, Alberta: University of Calgary.
- Riel and the Rebellion: 1885 Reconsidered. Saskatoon: Western Producer Prairie Books. 1983. ISBN 978-0888331083.

=== Selected journal articles ===
- 1996 Thomas Flanagan; Gerhard Ens (1996). "Metis Land Grants in Manitoba: A Statistical Study" (PDF). Social History. 27 (53): 65–87.
- 1990 Flanagan, Thomas (1990). "The History of Métis Aboriginal Rights: Politics, Principles and Policy". Canadian Journal of Law and Society. 5: 71–94. doi:10.1017/s0829320100001721. S2CID 142986900.
- 1986 Flanagan, Thomas (1986). "Louis Riel: A Review Essay". Journal of Canadian Studies. 21 (2): 157–164. doi:10.3138/jcs.21.2.157. S2CID 149092044.
- 1983 Flanagan, Thomas (1983). "The Case Against Métis Aboriginal Rights". Canadian Public Policy. 9 (3): 314–325. doi:10.2307/3550780. JSTOR 3550780.

=== Book chapters ===
- 1985 Flanagan, Thomas (1985). "Métis Aboriginal Rights: Some Historical and Contemporary Problems". In Menno Boldt; et al. (eds.). The Quest for Justice: Aboriginal Peoples and Aboriginal Rights. Toronto: University of Toronto Press. pp. 230–245.
- 1983 Flanagan, Thomas (1983). "Louis Riel and Aboriginal Rights". In Ian A. L. Getty; Antoine S. Lussier (eds.). As Long as the Sun Shines and Water Flows: A Reader in Canadian Native Studies. Vancouver, BC: University of British Columbia Press.
- 1979 Flanagan, Thomas (1979). "The Political Thought of Louis Riel". In Antoine S. Lussier (ed.). Riel and the Métis. Winnipeg, Manitoba: Métis Federation Press. pp. 131–160.

== Notes ==
Political offices
| Preceded by Jim McEachern | Chief of Staff to the Leader of the Official Opposition; 2002–2003 | Succeeded by Phil Murphy |
Party political offices
| New political party | National Campaign Manager of the Conservative Party of Canada; 2003–2005 | Succeeded by Doug Finley |
Awards
| Preceded by David Gratzer | Donner Prize; 2000 | Succeeded by Marie McAndrew |
