= Tim Patterson =

Canadian geologist

- Born: St. Stephen, New Brunswick
- Education: Dalhousie University (BA, BSc), University of California, Los Angeles (PhD)
- Known for: Climate Change and Environmental Earth Sciences
- Scientific career
- Fields: Micropaleontology, Paleoclimatology, Paleolimnology, Paleoceanography, Environmental Earth Sciences
- Workplaces: University of Southern California, Carleton University
- Thesis: (1986)
- Doctoral advisor: Helen Niña Tappan Loeblich
- Other academic advisors: David B. Scott, Franco S. Medioli, Alfred R. Loeblich Jr, Charlotte A. Brunner
- Website: carleton.ca/timpatterson/

R. Timothy Patterson is a Canadian professor of geology, chairman of the Department of Earth Sciences at Carleton University, Ottawa, Ontario, Canada, and a researcher with specialization in paleolimnology, paleoceanography, and paleoclimatology. He founded and is co-director of the Carleton Climate and Environmental Research Group (CCERG) He has previously served as director of the Ottawa-Carleton Geoscience Centre and as senior visiting fellow in the School of Geography, Queen's University of Belfast, Northern Ireland.

== Research ==
Patterson is also an international lecturer and media commentator, primarily contributing to increasing public awareness of environmental issues. He co-founded and served as executive editor (1997–2000) of Palaeontologia Electronica (PE). Palaeontologia Electronica covers all aspects of palaeontology, and is the world's longest-running open-access, peer-reviewed electronic journal. He also previously served as associate editor for the Journal of Foraminiferal Research (1995–2008), and the journal Micropaleontology (1990–1997).

Patterson works on a wide array of research subjects, most of which are based on analysis of marine and lake sediments to reconstruct past environments. He uses many techniques to understand the history of marine and lake environments from the perspective of: 1) the influence of climate variability on aquatic ecosystem services (AES); 2) the impact of degradation resulting from human activities on AES, and 3) the degree to which remediation and mitigation efforts are successful in improving AES. He has developed technologies that permit extraction of very high-resolution paleoenvironmental records, and uses time series analysis techniques to recognize trends and cycles in the climate record. Other research focuses on assessing the impact of nutrient loading and road salt contamination on lake environments.

== Views on climate change ==
Patterson has publicly opposed the scientific consensus on climate change which says that burning fossil fuels causes global warming. He has promoted the view that changes in the Earth's climate are influenced less by carbon dioxide than by solar cycles, changes in the Earth's orbit around the Sun, and cosmic rays. Patterson is an advisor to Friends of Science, an organization that rejects the concept that climate change is caused by human activity. He is associated with the Heartland Institute, another climate denial organization. In a 2002 news conference sponsored by Imperial Oil and other companies, he argued against Canada ratifying the Kyoto Protocol.

In June 2007 he authored an article in the Financial Post as part of its series on scientists who disagreed with the scientific consensus. The article predicted general climatic cooling as the Sun enters Solar cycle 25 about 2018, which did not occur. He has previously accepted, along with several other climate change deniers, fossil fuel industry money.

== Environmental research ==
More recently he led a research team that investigated the long term viability under a changing climate of the Tibbitt to Contwoyto Winter Road (TCWR), the world's longest heavy haul ice road, that extends 588 km north from the start point in Yellowknife Northwest Territories (NT). Statistical downscale climate model projections produced by the team suggest that under a projected future warming scenario that there is a trend towards thinner lake ice and a reduced time window when lake ice is at sufficient thickness to support trucks on the ice road. It was also recognized during this work that further complications are presented by the cyclic influences of climate teleconnections such as El Niño, Pacific Decadal Oscillation, as well as variability in solar forcing. Considering the importance of this ice road to the economy of the NT the work highlighted the need for planners and policy makers to consider future changes in climate when planning annual haulage along the TCWR. The work is of practical application to industry, which under the Mine Site Reclamation Policy for the Northwest Territories requires that mine operators plan for closure and cleanup of mine sites before operations even begin. The realization that limnological conditions in lakes adjacent to new mine sites may naturally vary considerably through the life cycle of a mine contributed valuable information for the environmental assessment process. Tim Patterson is presently co-team lead, together with professors Francine McCarthy and Martin Head of Brock University, in the effort to have Crawford Lake within the Crawford Lake Conservation Area, Milton, Ontario, designated as the Global Boundary Stratotype Section and Point (GSSP) for the proposed Anthropocene Epoch, with a start point in the mid-20th century. The annually deposited varves recovered with freeze corers from the lake provide a perfectly preserved record of the post WWII Great Acceleration and nuclear testing, which are key requirements for the Anthropocene GSSP.

== Select publications ==
- Patterson, R.T., Swindles, G.T., 2015. Influence of ocean-atmostpheric oscillations on lake ice phenology in eastern North America. Climate Dynamics. v. 45, p. 293–2308.
- Patterson, R.T., Chang, A.S., Prokoph, A., Roe, H.M., Swindles, G.T. 2013. Influence of the Pacific Decadal Oscillation, El Niño-Southern Oscillation and solar forcing on climate and primary productivity changes in the northeast Pacific. Quaternary International. v. 310 p. 124–139.
- Patterson, R.T., Prokoph, A., Reinhardt, E., and Roe, H., 2007. "Climate cyclicity in anoxic marine sediments from the Seymour-Belize Inlet Complex, British Columbia". Marine Geology. v. 242, 123–140.
- Patterson, R.T., Dalby, A.P., Roe, H.M., Guilbault, J.-P., Hutchinson, I., and Clague, J.J. 2005. "Relative utility of foraminifera, diatoms and macrophytes as high resolution indicators of paleo-sea level". Quaternary Science Reviews, v. 24, p. 2002–2014.
- Chang, A.S., and Patterson, R.T. 2005. "Climate shift at 4400 years BP: Evidence from high-resolution diatom stratigraphy, Effingham Inlet, British Columbia, Canada". Palaeogeography, Palaeclimatology, Palaeoecology. v. 226, 72–92.
- Patterson, R.T., Prokoph, A., and Chang, A.S. 2004. "Late Holocene sedimentary response to solar and cosmic ray activity influenced climate variability in the NE Pacific". Sedimentary Geology. 172, p. 67–84.
- Prokoph, A., and Patterson, R.T. 2004. "Application of wavelet and discontinuity analysis to trace temperature changes: Eastern Ontario as a case study. Atmosphere Ocean". v. 42, p. 201–212.
- Patterson, R.T., Fowler, A.D., and Huber, B., 2004. "Evidence of Hierarchical Organization in the Planktic Foraminiferal Evolutionary Record". Journal of Foraminiferal Research, v. 34 (2), p. 85–95.
- Patterson, R.T., Prokoph A., Wright, C., Chang, A.S., Thomson, R.E., and Ware, D.M., 2004. "Holocene Solar Variability and Pelagic Fish Productivity in the NE Pacific". Palaeontologia Electronica, v. 6 (1). 17 pp.
- Gehrels, W.R., Milne, G.A., Jason R. Kirby, J.R., Patterson, R.T., and Belknap, D.F., 2004. "Late Holocene sea-level changes and isostatic crustal movements in Atlantic Canada. Quaternary International". v. 120, p. 79–89.

== Academic group memberships ==
- Director, Coquina Press, publisher of Palaeontologia Electronica
- Geological Society of America (GSA)
- Society for Sedimentary Geology (SEPM)
- North American Micropaleontological Society (NAMS)
