= Frontier Centre for Public Policy =

Canadian public policy think tank

- Established: 1997
- Founder: Peter Holle
- Type: Public Policy Think Tank
- Headquarters: 203 – 2727 Portage Avenue; Winnipeg, Manitoba, Canada
- Coordinates: 49.8785°N 97.2728°W
- President: Peter Holle
- Chairman: Wayne Anderson
- VP Development and Engagement: David Leis
- Website: www.fcpp.org

The Frontier Centre for Public Policy (FCPP) is a Canadian public policy think tank founded in 1997 in Winnipeg, Manitoba, Canada. The Centre favors free markets and has promoted climate change denial. It is part of the Atlas Network of neoliberal think tanks.

== Publications and controversies ==
=== Residential schools ===
In September 2018, the Frontier Centre ran a radio ad which asked "are Canadians being told the whole truth" about the Canadian Indian residential school system. According to the Canadian Broadcasting Corporation (CBC), the ad stated that the "average stay was less than five years and the vast majority of Aboriginal youth never attended", and that "there is little evidence that abuse that was suffered by a grandparent had any affect on the academic success of the generations that followed". CBC quoted a professor who described the Frontier Centre's position as "egregiously wrong" and "knowingly turning its back on the facts." Perry Bellegarde of the Assembly of First Nations denounced the ad for downplaying the "overwhelming research and evidence that shows the harmful, negative impacts of residential school".

The Centre published in 2021 an anthology of 13 articles criticizing editorial, legal and historical defects in the publications of the Truth and Reconciliation Commission of Canada (2015). A general theme was that the TRC 500-page Summary—published first—does not reflect even-handedly the 3,000 other pages of the final report (in six volumes.)

=== Climate change ===
According to research by Aldous Sperl at Carleton University, the Frontier Centre for Public Policy (FCPP) is historically part of seven climate denial groups in Canada, including the Friends of Science (FOS), the International Climate Science Coalition (ICSC), the Fraser Institute (FI), Energy Probe (EP), Natural Resources Stewardship Project (NRSP), and the Canadian Coalition for Responsible Environmental Solutions (CCRES). Sperl notes that these groups all comprise a relatively small group of people that work closely together and cite each others work. Sperl also makes the distinction between groups that are dedicated just to climate denial, and groups like the FCPP, which he categorizes as having a larger mission that is "free-market oriented" and advocates for multiple positions but whose environmental focus is climate change denial. Sociologist Timothy J. Haney of Mount Royal University characterizes FCPP as taking a more "bureaucratic and academic" tone when compared to other conservative think tanks who defend the oil industry.

In a 2013 study, the centre was noted as publishing two books against the scientific consensus on climate change. In 2011 and 2012 the Frontier Centre put on its website and in letters allegations of fraud made by Timothy Ball against climate scientist Michael E. Mann, who issued a lawsuit. In June 2019 the Frontier Centre apologised for publishing "untrue and disparaging accusations which impugned the character of Dr. Mann."

In a paper about climate ethics published in 2022, philosopher Francesca Pongiglione and philosopher of science Carlo Martini at Vita-Salute San Raffaele University described FCPP as an "independent think tank known to be a front for the corporate climate denial agenda."

== Funding ==
The Frontier Centre is funded by private charitable foundations (63%) such as the Aurea Foundation and the Heartland Institute, businesses (18%), individuals (18%), and by events (1%).
