= Rainer Knopff =

Canadian political scientist

Rainer Knopff is a writer, professor of political science at the University of Calgary, Canada, and member of a group known as the Calgary School. He especially well known for his views about the influence of judicial decisions on Canadian public policy. In 2010, Knopff was appointed by then-Prime Minister Stephen Harper to the Governor General Consultation Committee, a special committee to recommend a successor to Governor General of Canada Michaëlle Jean. The panel recommended David Johnston, who was installed as viceroy on October 1, 2010.

== Affiliations ==
Rainer Knopff is often described as a member of the Calgary School, which includes a group of conservatively inclined professors at the University of Calgary, such as Barry Cooper, F. L.(Ted) Morton, Tom Flanagan (political scientist), and history professor David Bercuson who are strongly committed to strategic and direct influence on public affairs with a long term vision. (Note: "There are tensions between the socially conservative and economically conservative factions within the school. Bercuson publicly criticized Morton's social policies, saying, " [they] were hard to stomach for a libertarian." (McLean, Archie. "Morton would use Alberta as his 'guinea pig': Social, religious views will drive policy, expert says". Edmonton Journal, December 2, 2006.) Such division brings into question whether its members reflect a coherent "school" of thought (Wikipedia article on Calgary School).")

By 1998, the Center for Strategic and International Studies (CSIS), a public policy research institution based in Washington, D.C., had already observed the ascendancy of the role of Calgary-based academics on Canadian public policy, specifically the Calgary School of political science (Rovinsky 1998:10).

The Calgary School are clever strategists who chose to write about contentious, controversial and current topics that "people care about" by simplifying and polarizing complex and sensitive issues giving them dramatic interest and mass appeal. Their role is not to clarify public policy alternatives available to help political leaders make informed choices.

== Criticism of Canadian Charter of Rights and Freedoms ==
Rainer Knopff writes on constitutional and judicial politics (Knopff 2008:44) and, since 1982, has been particularly active in challenging the Canadian Charter of Rights and Freedoms, often with F. L. Morton. (Note: which a bill of rights entrenched in the Constitution of Canada anc forms the first part of the Constitution Act, 1982. The Charter guarantees certain political rights to Canadian citizens and civil rights of everyone in Canada from the policies and actions of all areas and levels of government. It is designed to unify Canadians around a set of principles that embody those rights. The Charter was signed into law by Queen Elizabeth II of Canada on April 17, 1982 along with the rest of the Act.)

In their book entitled The Charter Revolution & the Court Party Morton and Knopff (2000) argue that "the advent of the Canadian Charter of Rights and Freedoms has drastically increased the power of judges in Canadian society. In deciding to use their new powers in an activist way, judges have been urged on by what Morton and Knopff call "the Court Party," a loose coalition of feminists, civil libertarians, government lawyers, Supreme Court clerks, law professors, and social activists, many funded principally by government (Morton and Knopff 2000:55)".

== Controversy ==
Knopff participated in a highly controversial debate to defend a Calgary School colleague whose career ended abruptly when his comments on the consumption of child pornography were publicized. In a statement from Elizabeth Cannon, President of the University of Calgary, regarding remarks made by Tom Flanagan, the university sought to distance itself from Flanagan's comments by declaring that they "absolutely do not represent the views of the University of Calgary. In the university's view, child pornography is not a victimless crime. All aspects of this horrific crime involve the exploitation of children. Viewing pictures serves to create more demand for these terrible images, which leads to further exploitation of defenseless children" (Cannon 2013).

In his criticism of the university, the CBC, and the Manning Institute, Knopff cited the "famous Sharpe case" in which "both the trial judge and the B.C. Court of Appeal struck down Canada's criminal prohibition of possessing child pornography" in what was called a "courageous" act in the face of a "hallmark of tyranny." Rainer agreed with the possession offence but also with his colleague's statement that the demand-side consumption of child pornography is one of personal liberty and suggested that as opposed to the production side, which is a more harmful crime, it could be addressed by treatment, not incarceration.
