= Calgary Foundation =

The Calgary Foundation (TCF) is a Canadian registered charity serving Calgary, Alberta.

The foundation was established by a group of community-minded citizens to meet a wide variety of social, cultural, educational, health, environmental, and community charitable needs in Calgary and the surrounding area. The foundation undertakes this work through the distribution of income from endowments and other funds established by donors. The foundation distributes five percent of the market value of each fund on an annual basis. Any income in excess of this, net of administration expenses, is added to the capital of the funds. As of 2007, it had endowments valued at $334 million and granted $33 million to 547 charitable organisations.

== History ==
The Calgary Foundation was founded in 1955 by community leaders like Doug Hawkes. Hawkes remembered the generosity of the Red Cross Agencies that took care of him while serving as a soldier in World War II and vowed to return the favour one day.

In the early 1960s the foundation received its first infusion of capital when twenty founding donors contributed $5,000 each. These and subsequent gifts to the foundation were pooled and invested. Income was then distributed as grants to local charitable organizations. The first grants were made in 1964 to the United Fund ($1,000) and to Mount Royal College ($500).
