= Tom Harris (mechanical engineer) =

Canadian mechanical engineer (born 1953)

Tom Harris (born 1953) is a Canadian mechanical engineer, executive director of the climate contrarian International Climate Science Coalition (ICSC) and former executive director of the Natural Resources Stewardship Project. Harris has 30 years’ experience working as a mechanical engineer, project manager, and in science and technology communications. From May to September 2006, he was Ottawa operations director of the High Park Group, a public relations and lobbying firm active in creating debate over global warming.

== Work at the International Climate Science Coalition ==
The ICSC calls itself "a non-partisan group of independent scientists", but has been described as having "less to do with science than with public relations". Geochemist and National Science Board member James Lawrence Powell contrasts the mission and principles of the ICSC with those of the American Geophysical Union. In Powell's opinion, the ICSC is a "denier organization" that "know[s] the answers and seek[s] only confirmation that they are right. One group of minds is open; the other closed".

James Hoggan, public relations professional and Chair of the board of the David Suzuki Foundation, and Richard Littlemore of DeSmogBlog.com quoted and analyzed some paragraphs from the ICSC website. They noted that Harris's views as executive director of the ICSC were published from the same IP address as and shared the tactics of the climate change denial organizations New Zealand Climate Science Coalition and Australian Climate Science Coalition. The New Zealand Climate Science Coalition created the ICSC in 2007 and ICSC led the creation of the Australian Climate Science Coalition in 2008, and the Climate Science Coalition of America in 2010.

== Speech at the 2008 International Conference on Climate Change ==
At the 2008 International Conference on Climate Change hosted by the Heartland Institute, Tom Harris gave a speech in which he discussed what he called "information sharing" and "coordinated local activism":

[...] We need regular high-impact media coverage of the findings of leading scientists — not just one or two publications, but we need to have hundreds all over the world. We need to have a high degree of information sharing and cooperation between groups, so that when Vincent Gray for example has an article published in New Zealand, we can take the same piece and we can (say) submit it to newspapers all over North America and Europe.
