= Bill C-3 =

Bill C-3 may refer to the following Canadian federal acts:

- An Act to amend the Citizenship Act (2025) (S.C. 2025, c. 5), removing the first-generation limit on citizenship by descent
- Gender Equity in Indian Registration Act (S.C. 2010, c. 18)
