= Jason Kenney =

Premier of Alberta from 2019 to 2022

The Honourable Jason Kenney PC ECA
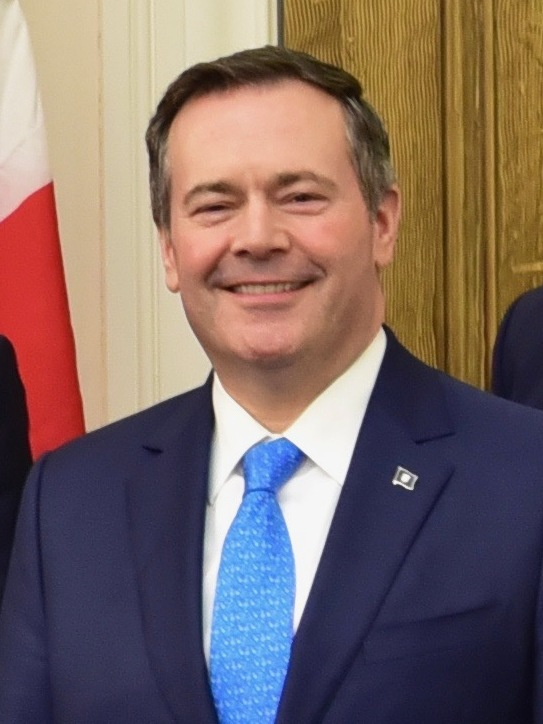
- Kenney in 2020

18th Premier of Alberta
- In office April 30, 2019 – October 11, 2022
- Monarchs: Elizabeth II; Charles III
- Lieutenant Governor: Lois Mitchell; Salma Lakhani
- Preceded by: Rachel Notley
- Succeeded by: Danielle Smith
Party leadership positions
Leader of the Opposition in Alberta
In office January 29, 2018 – April 30, 2019
Deputy	Leela Aheer
Preceded by	Jason Nixon
Succeeded by	Rachel Notley
Leader of the United Conservative Party
In office October 30, 2017 – October 6, 2022
Deputy	Mike Ellis; Leela Aheer; Vacant (2021–2022)
Preceded by	Nathan Cooper (interim)
Succeeded by	Danielle Smith
Leader of the Progressive Conservative Association of Alberta
In office March 18, 2017 – July 24, 2017
Preceded by	Ric McIver (interim)
Succeeded by	Nathan Cooper (as interim leader of the United Conservative Party)
28th Canadian Ministry
Minister of National Defence
In office February 9, 2015 – November 4, 2015
Prime Minister	Stephen Harper
Preceded by	Rob Nicholson
Succeeded by	Harjit Sajjan
Minister for Multiculturalism
In office August 16, 2013 – November 4, 2015
Prime Minister	Stephen Harper
Preceded by	Himself (as minister of Citizenship, Immigration and Multiculturalism)
Succeeded by	Position abolished
Minister of Employment and Social Development
In office July 15, 2013 – February 9, 2015
Prime Minister	Stephen Harper
Preceded by	Diane Finley (Human Resources and Social Development)
Succeeded by	Pierre Poilievre
Minister of Citizenship, Immigration and Multiculturalism
In office October 30, 2008 – July 15, 2013
Prime Minister	Stephen Harper
Preceded by	Diane Finley
Succeeded by	Chris Alexander
Secretary of State for Multiculturalism and Canadian Identity
In office January 4, 2007 – October 29, 2008
Prime Minister	Stephen Harper
Minister	Bev Oda; Josée Verner
Preceded by	Position established
Succeeded by	Position abolished
Parliamentary constituencies
Member of the Alberta Legislative Assembly for Calgary-Lougheed
In office December 14, 2017 – November 29, 2022
Preceded by	Dave Rodney
Succeeded by	Eric Bouchard
Member of Parliament for Calgary Midnapore (Calgary Southeast; 1997–2015)
In office June 2, 1997 – September 23, 2016
Preceded by	Jan Brown
Succeeded by	Stephanie Kusie (2017)

Personal details
- Born: Jason Thomas Kenney; May 30, 1968 (age 58) Oakville, Ontario, Canada
- Party: United Conservative (since 2017)
- Other political affiliations: Federal: Reform (1997–2000); Alliance (2000–2003); Conservative (since 2003); Provincial: Progressive Conservative (2016–2017)
- Education: University of San Francisco (no degree)
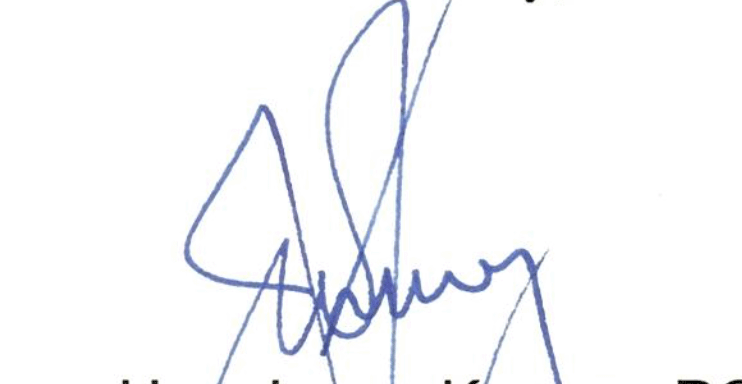
- Signature

Jason Thomas Kenney PC ECA (born May 30, 1968) is a former Canadian politician who served as the 18th premier of Alberta from 2019 until 2022, and the leader of the United Conservative Party (UCP) from 2017 until 2022. He also served as the member of the Legislative Assembly (MLA) for Calgary-Lougheed from 2017 until 2022. Kenney was the last leader of the Alberta Progressive Conservative Party (PC Party) before the party merged with the Wildrose Party to form the UCP. Prior to entering Alberta provincial politics, he served in various cabinet posts under Prime Minister Stephen Harper from 2006 to 2015.

Kenney studied philosophy at the University of San Francisco, but returned to Canada without completing his degree. In 1989, he was hired as the first executive director of the Alberta Taxpayers Association before becoming the president and chief executive officer of the Canadian Taxpayers Federation. Kenney was elected to the House of Commons in the 1997 federal election for the Reform Party. In 2000, he was re-elected as a Canadian Alliance candidate and then was re-elected five times as a candidate for the Conservative Party of Canada.

Following the Conservative victory in the 2006 federal election, Kenney was appointed parliamentary secretary to Prime Minister Harper. In January 2007, he was sworn into the Privy Council as the secretary of state for multiculturalism and Canadian identity. Kenney held the post of minister for citizenship, immigration and multiculturalism from October 2008 to July 2013, when he became minister of employment and social development and minister for multiculturalism. In February 2015, he was named minister of national defence. Kenney was considered a potential party leader following the defeat of the Conservative government in October 2015 and resignation of Harper as leader.

In July 2016, Kenney announced his intention to run for the leadership of the Alberta PCs in that party's 2017 leadership election. Kenney resigned his seat in Parliament on September 23, after sitting in the House of Commons for over 19 years. He was elected party leader on March 18, 2017, on a platform of merging with the Wildrose Party. He was leader until the merger was effected on July 24. Kenney was then elected United Conservative Party leader on October 28.

On April 16, 2019, Kenney led the United Conservative Party to a majority government in the 2019 Alberta general election, defeating incumbent Premier Rachel Notley of the New Democratic Party. Kenney came under criticism for his handling of the COVID-19 pandemic from members within the UCP and the general public, triggering a leadership review in May 2022. On May 18, 2022, Kenney narrowly won the leadership review 51.4% to 48.6%, but announced that this support was insufficient and that he would step down as UCP leader. Kenney remained premier until October 11, 2022. Danielle Smith was chosen to succeed him by the United Conservative Party on October 6, 2022.

== Early life and career ==
Jason Thomas Kenney was born on May 30, 1968, in Oakville, Ontario, the son of Lynne (Tunbridge) and Robert Martin Kenney. His father was a teacher at Appleby College and was of Irish heritage. Kenney's grandfather was jazz musician and big band leader Mart Kenney.

Kenney attended the Athol Murray College of Notre Dame in Wilcox, Saskatchewan, a private Catholic high school of which his father was president. Kenney may have been inspired to enter politics following a brief discussion with former prime minister John Diefenbaker.

Kenney studied philosophy at the University of San Francisco, a Jesuit university in San Francisco, California, but failed to complete his coursework. It was there that he discovered conservatism. During his time in California, Kenney was interviewed by CNN for a segment exploring religious values. In the segment, where he was credited as "Jason Kenny – Anti-abortion Activist," he argued against Jesuit professors who declared free speech as essential to a university. Allowing pro-choice activists on campus, Kenney argued, was "destroying the mission and the purpose of this university." In the student newspaper, the San Francisco Foghorn, he suggested that giving a platform to pro-choice groups would mean the school had no basis to refuse a similar platform to pedophiles or to the Church of Satan.

The Archbishop rejected Kenney's petition that summer, and he never returned to complete his undergraduate degree. Instead, Kenney returned to Canada to begin work for the Saskatchewan Liberal Party. He was "very involved in the young Liberals" as a young man, and in 1988 was executive assistant to Ralph Goodale, the leader of the provincial party at the time. Not long after, in 1989, Kenney was hired as the first executive director of the Alberta Taxpayers Association, which advocated for fiscal responsibility. In 1990, Kenney was named president and chief executive officer of the Canadian Taxpayers Federation, a self-described taxpayer's advocacy group that scrutinizes governmental expenditure from a conservative perspective.

== In opposition (1997–2006) ==
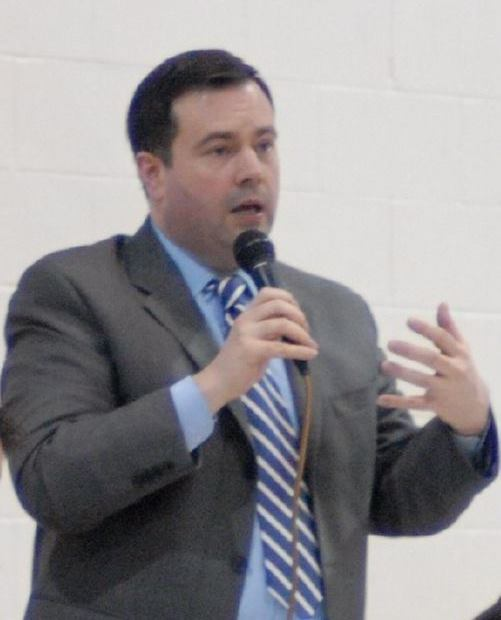
Kenney at the All Candidates Forum at McKenzie Lake Community Centre in Calgary's Southeast, January 14, 2006

Kenney was first elected to the Canadian House of Commons in 1997, at the age of 29. He was elected as a member of the Reform Party of Canada, which later became the Canadian Alliance. While a member of the House of Commons, Kenney was co-chair of the United Alternative Task Force, national co-chairman of Stockwell Day's campaign for leadership of the Alliance, and national co-chair of the Canadian Alliance's 2000 election campaign. While on the Opposition benches between 1997 and 2006, Kenney served in several prominent shadow cabinet roles, including deputy House leader for the Official Opposition, critic for Canada–United States relations, critic for national revenue, and critic for finance.

He was a member of a group of Reform Party MPs that were known as the Snack Pack due to their habit of eating greasy food and ridiculing the ruling Liberals.

Kenney supported the 2003 invasion of Iraq and suggested that the Chrétien government's refusal to support the war would damage Canada's relationship with the United States.

Kenney was a member of the Canada Tibet Committee and hosted the Dalai Lama in 2010.

== Parliamentary Secretary to the Prime Minister (2006–2007) ==
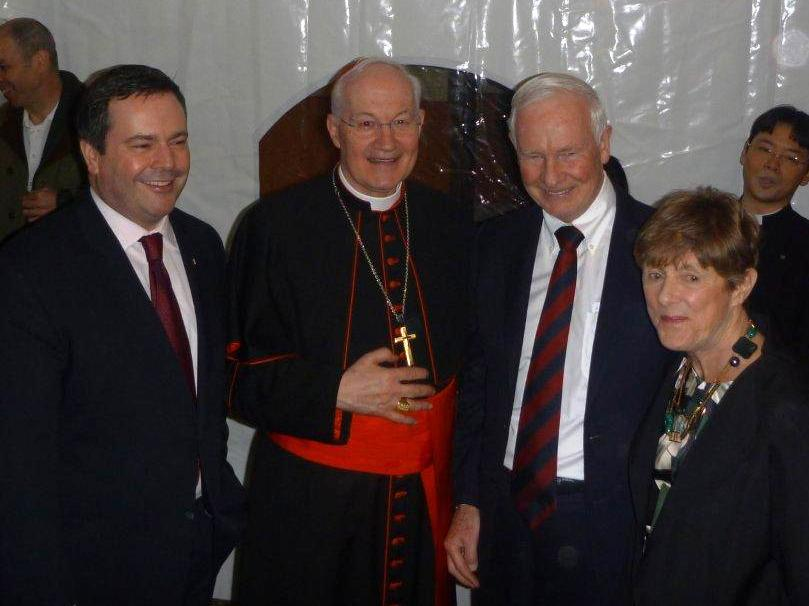
Kenney, Cardinal Marc Ouellet, and David Lloyd Johnston at the Pontifical Canadian College in Rome in preparation for the inauguration of Pope Francis

On February 6, 2006, Kenney and Sylvie Boucher were appointed as parliamentary secretaries to the prime minister, Stephen Harper. That August, when two opposition MPs suggested removing Hezbollah from Canada's list of terrorist organizations, Kenney came under fire for comparing the organization to the Nazi Party. Later, he rebuked Prime Minister of Lebanon Fuad Saniora for his criticisms of Canada, invoking the $25 million CAD that the country received from Canada in reconstructive assistance during the 2006 Lebanon War.

== Secretary of State for Multiculturalism and Canadian Identity (2007–2008) ==
On January 4, 2007, Kenney was sworn in as the secretary of state for multiculturalism and Canadian identity and as a Privy Councillor. In this capacity, Kenney was the Harper government's representative to ethnic communities in Canada, and made frequent appearances at ethnic community events across the country.

In early 2008, Kenney posted an announcement on his website, declaring that the Canadian government recognized the flag of the Republic of Vietnam as the symbol of the Vietnamese-Canadian community. Further, he declared that "attempts to disparage [the flag] are a deeply troubling attack on one of Canada's ethnic communities and on the principles of multiculturalism." In May 2008, he made a speech at an Army of the Republic of Vietnam rally, lending support to the program.

That same month, Kenney launched the Community Historical Recognition Program (CHRP), which established $13.5 million CAD in funding over five years for commemorative projects by ethno-cultural communities that had been subject to discriminatory Canadian immigration and wartime policies. By the project's conclusion in 2013, all of the funds had been utilized, save for $500,000 that was earmarked for education about the Chinese head tax, and was left unspent when one Chinese community group failed to file the required paperwork. Because more than thirty other projects involving the Chinese-Canadian community had been funded through the CHRP, Kenney considered the project a success and declined to release the funding, citing the conclusion of the program. In 2013, Kenney said in his remarks on the end of the CHRP program that the government was "committed to recognizing and educating Canadians about the experiences of those pioneers who overcame such heavy burdens. Their experiences mark an unfortunate period in our nation's history. We must ensure that they are never forgotten."

== Minister of Citizenship, Immigration and Multiculturalism (2008–2013) ==
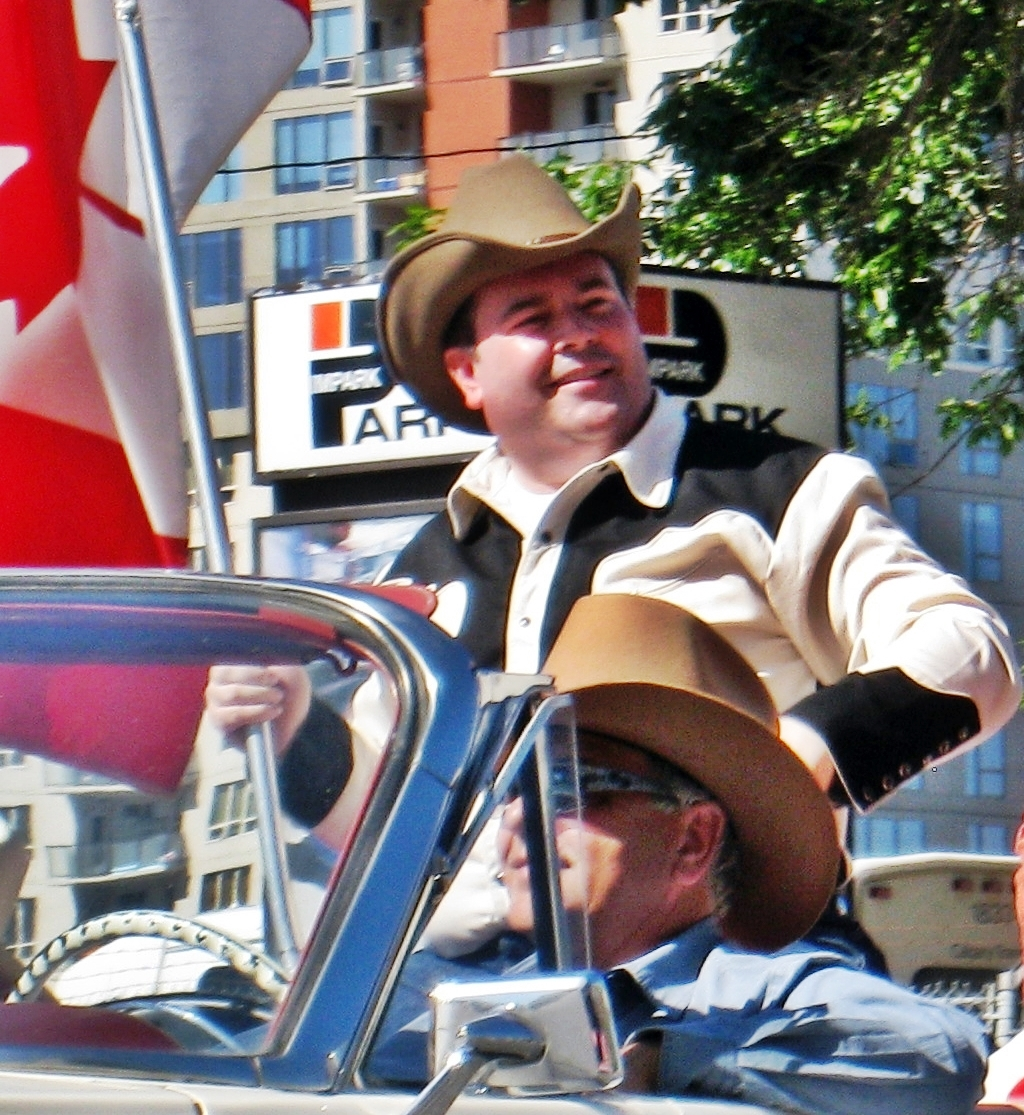
Jason Kenney in the 2010 Calgary Stampede Parade

In 2008, Kenney became Minister of Citizenship and Immigration in Prime Minister Stephen Harper's cabinet shuffle of October 30, while retaining responsibility for multiculturalism, which he had been given in 2007.

In April 2009, Kenney officially launched Asian Heritage Month to "better understand the rich diversity the Asian Canadian community brings to Canada".

While speaking in Jerusalem in December 2009 about Canadian government funding of human rights organizations, Kenney said, "We have de-funded organizations, most recently, like KAIROS who are taking a leadership role in the boycott [of Israel]. We're receiving a lot of criticism for these decisions ... but we believe we have done these things for the right reasons, and we stand by these decisions." He later added in a letter to the Toronto Star that, "While I disagree with the nature of KAIROS's militant stance toward the Jewish homeland, that is not the reason their request for taxpayer funding was denied."

On June 26, 2010, Kenney announced changes to the Skilled Worker Immigration Program. For their applications to be processed, skilled worker applicants were thereafter required to either have an offer of arranged employment or be qualified in one of 29 eligible occupations out of the 520 described in the National Occupational Classification (NOC). A cap of 20,000 applications per year for the skilled workers class was also introduced. As of July 1, 2011, a maximum of 10,000 Federal Skilled Worker applications will be considered for processing in the subsequent 12 months. Within the 10,000 cap, a maximum of 500 federal skilled worker applications per eligible occupation will be considered for processing each year.

Kenney said that his reform of the immigration point system fixed problems with the previous immigration system. He also said the new system was more efficient in accepting migrants who could make the best contributions to the Canadian economy. The Canadian Experience Class Program was created to attract more international students who qualify as a graduate in the program, with an increased focus on youth, job skills, and a fluency in English or French. And at the same time, the immigration department imposed a new language requirement for the Federal Skilled Workers (FSW) program. Many of these changes were made to reduce the processing times for immigration applications. Vancouver immigration lawyer Richard Kurland said that these changes would guarantee "no more backlogs." Kenney, however, decided to delete the backlog of 280,000 skilled worker applications, and a lawsuit by the deleted applicants failed to preserve the applications.

There was significant criticism of the institution of a Designated Country of Origin (DCO) list, which attributes countries as being unlikely to persecute. Therefore, refugee claimants coming from these countries—including Hungary, Mexico, and Israel—will undergo a different refugee claimant process than those from non-DCO countries. Furthermore, refugee claimants from countries on the DCO no longer receive emergency healthcare coverage.

In 2011, Kenney imposed a ban on niqab face veils for those taking the oath of citizenship. In his appeal on behalf of the Department of Citizenship and Immigration in Citizenship and Immigration v Ishaq, 2015 FCA 194, the three justices ruled in favour of Zunera Ishaq and her right to wear the niqab, confirming that the federal requirement was unlawful.

=== Investigations into citizenship fraud ===
On July 19, 2011, Kenney announced that the government intended to revoke the citizenship of 1,800 people it believes obtained their status through fraudulent means. The decision to revoke Canadian citizenship was rare, and a large-scale proposed crackdown had no precedent. At the time of his announcement, fewer than 70 citizenships had been revoked since the Citizenship Act, 1946.

An investigation into residence fraud continued to grow, and almost 11,000 cases were being reviewed in September 2012. Citizenship and Immigration Canada (CIC) revoked up to 3,100 citizens' citizenship, citing cheating or lies. Kenney said of the matter, "Canadian citizenship is not for sale and we are taking action to strip citizenship and permanent residence status from people who do not play by rules." CIC worked in tandem with the Canada Border Services Agency (CBSA), the Royal Canadian Mounted Police (RCMP), and various overseas Canadian offices to prevent citizenship fraud. Minister of Public Safety and Emergency Preparedness Vic Toews said that "These efforts reinforce our government's commitment to protecting the integrity of our immigration system." The CIC estimates that about 5,000 people with Canadian permanent resident status are outside of Canada, and implicated in residence fraud.

In January 2009, Kenney made public statements critical of U.S. soldiers seeking asylum in Canada who were facing punishment for their refusal to participate in the Iraq War. Unlike in the Vietnam era, Kenney said, the current asylum seekers were neither "draft dodgers" nor "resisters", but rather "people who volunteer to serve in the armed forces of a democratic country and simply change their mind to desert. And that's fine, that's the decision they have made, but they are not refugees." He also referred to the asylum seekers as "bogus refugee claimants". These remarks were seen by some supporters of the asylum seekers as a form of interference in the asylum process. Kenney believed that Kimberly Rivera, an American soldier seeking refuge, was not a legitimate refugee. "Military deserters from the United States are not genuine refugees under the internationally accepted meaning of the term," said Alexis Pavlich, the minister's press secretary.

In 2012, Kenney took steps in 2012 to find and combat marriage fraud. His efforts were primarily focused on marriages in which one party was a Canadian citizen and the other, an immigrant, was using marriage to facilitate their entry into Canada, at which point they would leave their sponsor's home and declare the marriage to be a lie. In response, Kenney instituted a five-year prohibition on spousal sponsorship for those who had already been sponsored by a spouse into Canada. He also implemented a "conditional" permanent residency status, to ensure that a spouse or partner had to live as husband and wife for a minimum of two years with their Canadian sponsor, or else they would have their status revoked.

=== Admissibility decisions ===
As part of Kenney's Faster Removal of Foreign Criminals Act, introduced in June 2012, the Minister of Citizenship, Immigration and Multiculturalism would have the ability to deny entry to Canada based on "public policy considerations." Kenney was quoted in The Globe and Mail as saying that present immigration laws do not allow someone to be kept out if they are seeking to promote violence. The previous year, both the official opposition New Democratic Party (NDP) and Quebec's National Assembly had asked Kenney to exercise negative discretion, but no such ability existed under Canadian law. During debate in the House of Commons, the NDP criticized this component of the bill, arguing it gives too much power to the minister.

Earlier, in March 2009, the CBSA prevented British politician George Galloway from entering Canada, where he had planned to give a series of speeches against the War in Afghanistan. The Office of the Immigration Minister stated that the Canada Border Services Agency deemed Galloway as inadmissible to Canada due to national security concerns. Galloway had openly given what he called "financial support" to Hamas, classified as a terrorist group in Canada.

Galloway pursued the matter in the Canadian court system, where it was revealed that Kenney's office had emailed the CBSA on the matter. The Federal Court found that Kenney's office had used "a flawed and overreaching interpretation of the standards under Canadian law for labeling someone as engaging in terrorism or being a member of a terrorist organization." The presiding judge also determined that the CBSA had produced its assessment of Galloway on scant evidence after receiving instructions from Kenney's staff, who attempted to bar Galloway because "they disagreed with his political views".

The Globe and Mail later pointed out that, while Kenney was quick to refuse Galloway entry into Canada, his department gave entry to controversial politician Geert Wilders, who compared Islam to fascism and campaigned to ban the Quran from the Netherlands. Wilders spoke in Toronto and Ottawa, generating further controversy.

=== Citizenship policy changes ===
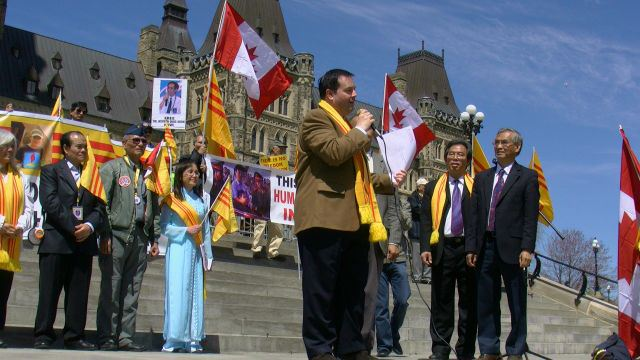
Jason Kenney's speech at Black April demonstration

A new law amending the Citizenship Act came into effect on April 17, 2009. One of the changes instituted by the Government of Canada is the "first generation limitation", considered a punitive measure by some against naturalized citizens who reside abroad for lengthy periods of time. Minister Kenney said the following in the House of Commons of Canada on June 10, 2010: "That's why we must protect the values of Canadian citizenship and must take steps against those who would cheapen it … We will strengthen the new limitation on the ability to acquire citizenship for the second generation born abroad." The new rules would not confer a Canadian citizenship on children born outside of Canada to parents who were also born outside of Canada. Thus, for children to obtain Canadian citizenship if born abroad, they would have to have one parent who was born in Canada. Another effect of this law was to abolish automatic citizenship by birth for the children of parents in Canada in the service of a foreign government. Children born to foreign diplomats in Canada would only become Canadian if at least one parent was either a Canadian citizen or a Permanent Resident.

Kenney took steps to restore full citizenship status to the "Lost Canadians", Canadian nationals who had "fallen through the cracks". Bill C-37 corrected the citizenship issues for 95% of "Lost Canadians," and special grants were to be made to resolve the remaining 5%. Kenney says the Lost Canadians group should not be politicizing their plight, but they should be making a "solid application and a strong case". Kenney's predecessor, Diane Finley, had authorized a special grant of citizenship to Guy Valliere, although he died prior to receiving citizenship.

=== Removal of references to LGBTQ+ rights in Canada ===
In 2010, Kenney introduced Discover Canada, a new citizenship guide for prospective citizens. The guide drew significant controversy when internal government documents revealed that Kenney's office had ordered the removal of all references to LGBTQ+ history and rights from an early draft, including the 1969 decriminalization of homosexuality, protections under the Charter of Rights and Freedoms, and the 2005 legalization of same-sex marriage. Senior immigration department officials explicitly issued internal warnings to Kenney's office regarding the omission, recommending a late-stage re-insertion of the text boxes covering sexual orientation equality rights; however, Kenney rejected the bureaucrats' advice. Following intense public pressure and media scrutiny after the guide's initial 2009 release, a single-sentence mention confirming full legal protection for gay and lesbian Canadians was added back in a 2011 revision.

=== Accusations of 'pinkwashing' ===
Kenney's office faced further backlash in 2012 over privacy violations and accusations of "pinkwashing" by LGBTQ+ advocates. Government staff harvested email addresses from independent online petitions—including one supporting a gay artist facing deportation—and used the data to send a mass, unsolicited promotional email titled "LGBT Refugees from Iran" to thousands of gay and lesbian Canadians. Organizations such as the Rainbow Refugee Committee criticized the maneuver, arguing that Kenney was using targeted messaging about protecting foreign refugees to deflect from his own parliamentary voting record against LGBTQ+ rights domestically.

=== Refugee reform ===
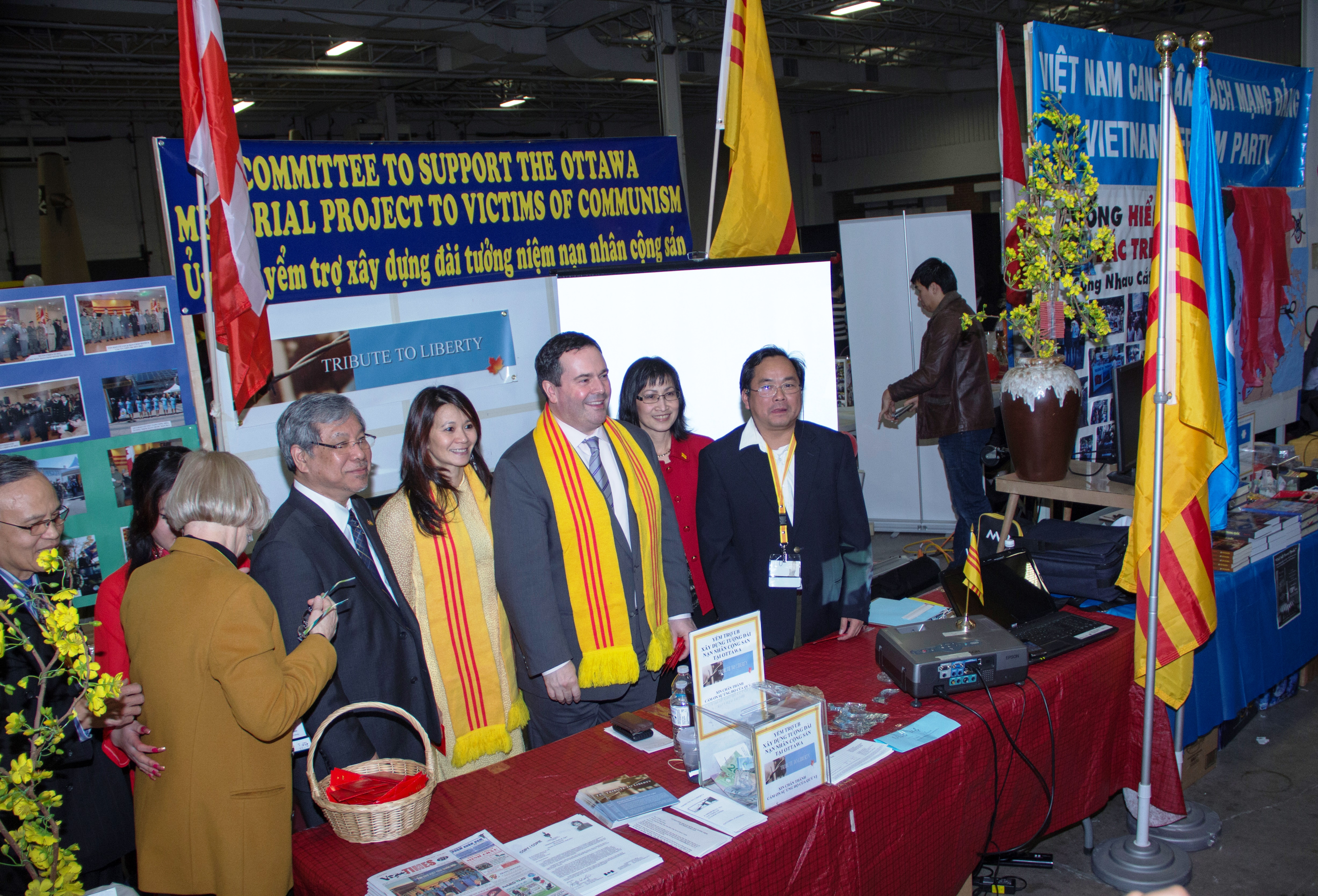
Jason Kenney and Senator Thanh Hai Ngo with Members of Committee To Support Victims of Communism

On March 29, 2010, Kenney announced an overhaul of the Canadian refugee system. The reform package committed to allowing the resettlement of 2,500 more refugees living in United Nations refugee camps and urban slums. The plan also included expansion of the Government-Assisted Refugees Program to 500 places, while a further 2,000 resettlement places were added to the Private Sponsorship of Refugees Program. In total, the new plan would lead to the resettlement of 14,500 UN-selected refugees from refugee camps and urban slums to Canada.

The Protecting Canada's Immigration System Act was introduced on February 16, 2012, and received Royal Assent on June 28, 2012. It was broadly criticized as it "gives Ministers broad, unfettered and unprecedented powers" among other new powers. It was sponsored by Kenney.

There was controversy around changes to Interim Federal Health, the social assistance program for refugee claimants. Physicians and allied health professionals opposed these cuts through national protests in all major cities in Canada. Physicians opposing the cuts to refugee health care include Vincent Lam, who stated that Canada is a country known for its tolerance and diversity, but healthcare professionals are "dismayed and ashamed at the cuts for healthcare for refugees."

Afghan interpreters who served alongside Canadian troops in southern Afghanistan, and who applied for Canadian visas on the basis of facing threats from insurgents, were denied visas. Kenney backed this decision.

Kenney promised that Canada would resettle more refugees from 2011 to 2012 than in previous years. Instead, there was a 26% drop in refugee resettlement in Canada during that period, hitting a 30-year low. Loly Rico, president of the Canadian Council for Refugees, criticized Kenney for not following through on his promise.

=== Office of Religious Freedom ===
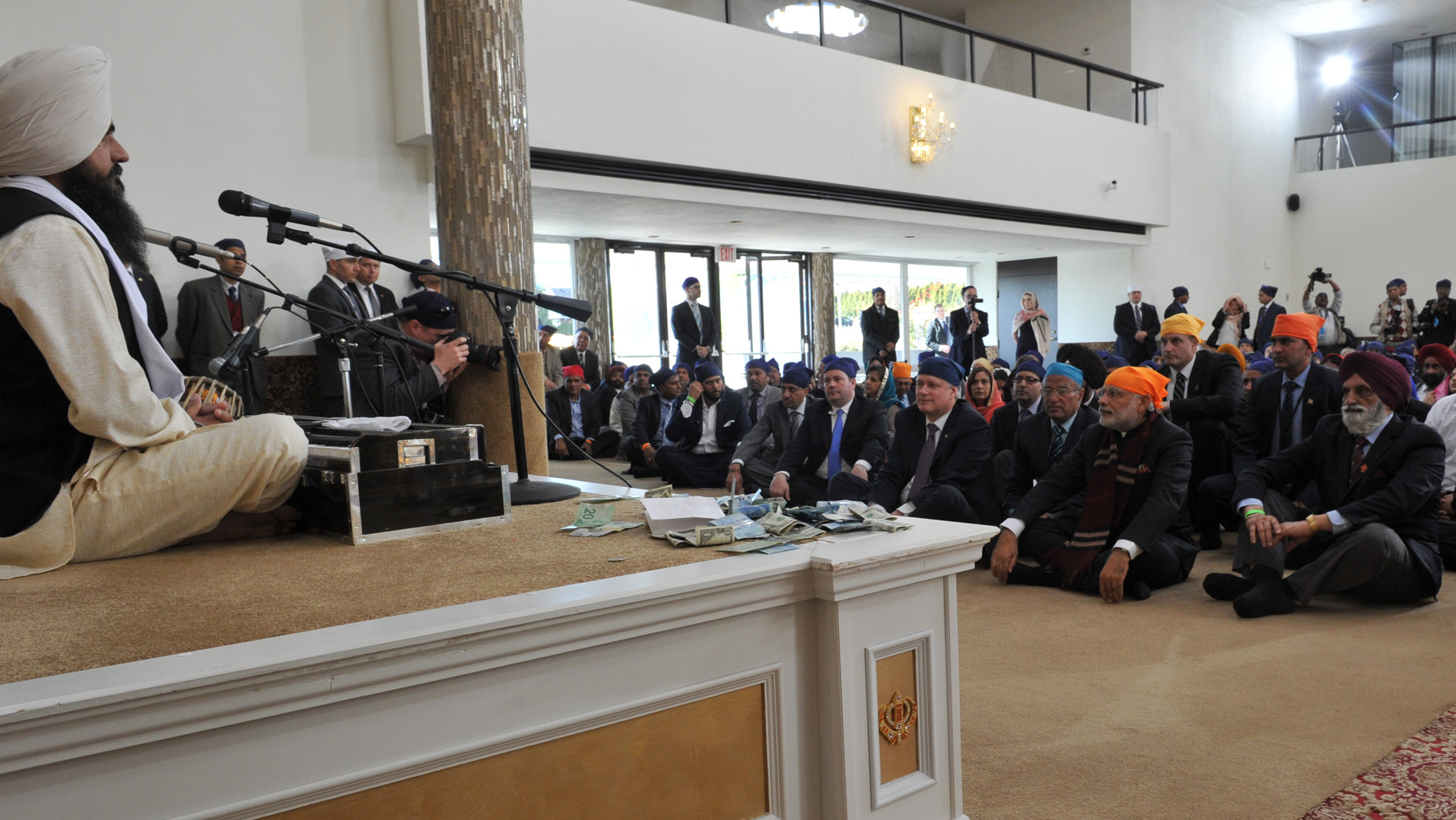
Kenney with Stephen Harper and Narendra Modi at a gurdwara in Vancouver

Following through on a Conservative campaign promise from the 2011 Canadian federal election, Kenney initiated the creation of the Office of Religious Freedom, an agency of Foreign Affairs Canada, to monitor religious oppression domestically and promote religious freedom internationally. Former British prime minister Tony Blair endorsed the office in a visit to Canada in 2013, saying, "I think it shows leadership from Canada. And Canada, by the way, in many ways is a perfect place from which to promote this ideal because of the complexion of the country." The Liberal government which formed after the 2015 Canadian federal election closed the office in 2016.

== Minister of Employment and Social Development (2013–2015) ==
As part of the July 2013 cabinet reorganization, Kenney was named Minister of Employment and Social Development. While in this position, he focused on expanding the review process for the Canada Pension Plan and Old Age Security disability appeals, which had become backlogged under the previous tribunal process.

In January 2014, Kenney reached an agreement with all provincial and territorial counterparts, except Quebec, to implement the Canada Job Grant, which aimed to train unemployed workers who did not qualify for unemployment insurance over a period of four years. The final agreement provided more flexibility for the provinces and territories than the initial 2013 proposal, which had been rejected by Kenney's counterparts for its "take it or leave it" nature, which potentially forced the provinces and territories to forgo $300 million of the $500 million in federal funding provided to them by Labour Market Agreements if they did not accept the plan. $2.5 million were spent on advertising for the program during Stanley Cup playoffs spots in 2013 and 2014, even before the details of the federal-provincial agreements were finalized or approved, which prompted Advertising Standards Canada to label them as "misleading."

== Minister of Defence (2015) ==
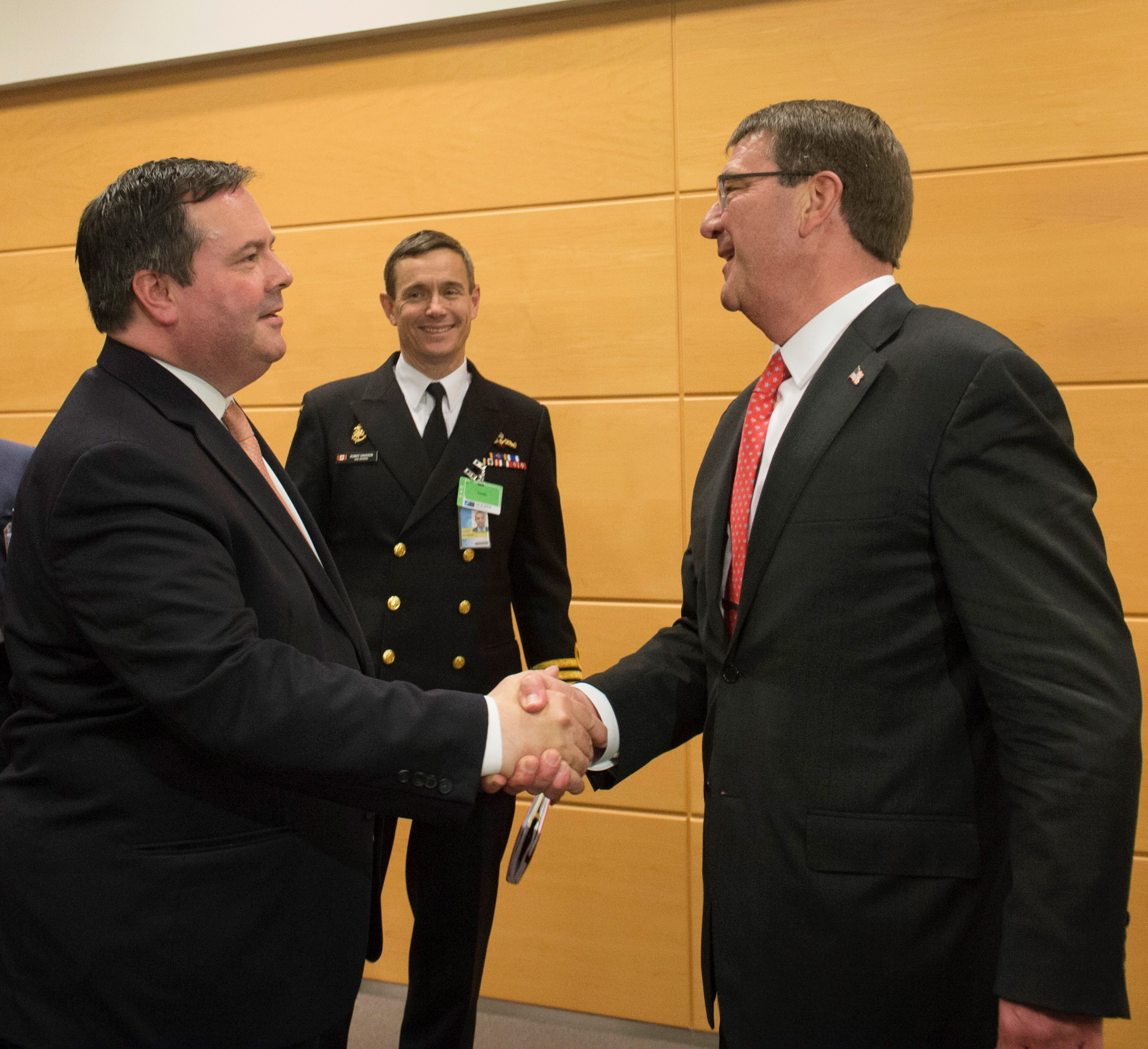
Canadian Minister of National Defense Jason Kenney meets U.S. Secretary of Defense Ash Carter at NATO Headquarters in Brussels, Belgium

After a February 2015 cabinet shuffle in which Minister of Foreign Affairs John Baird left federal politics, with former defence minister Rob Nicholson taking his place, Kenney was promoted to Minister of Defence. While serving in this position, Kenney took a hard-line approach to national security, saying that it was necessary for Canada to fight against Islamic State militants to prevent them from becoming a threat to the country.

In March 2015, Kenney claimed that Russian warships had confronted Royal Canadian Navy craft, and that Russian fighters had buzzed HMCS Fredericton at low altitude while it participated in a NATO maritime task force off the coast of Ukraine as part of a mission against Russian intervention in the country. NATO officials later stated that Russian ships could be seen on the horizon, but never approached the fleet, and that all flyovers had been at high altitudes.

Later that month, Kenney defended the Canadian airstrike campaign against ISIS being extended into Syria, claiming that, among the coalition air forces, only Canada and the United States had aircraft capable of using precision guided munitions. In fact, Arab allies such as Saudi Arabia and the United Arab Emirates had won praise from general Martin Dempsey, the chairman of the US Joint Chiefs of Staff, for their use of precision guided munitions. General Tom Lawson, then the Chief of Canada's Defence Staff, issued a statement defending Kenney, but later retracted his statement and apologized, saying that its contents were incorrect. Sources within the Department of Defence say that Lawson had been pressured into releasing the inaccurate statement by Kenney's office.

Also in March, Kenney faced criticism for tweeting photos purporting to be of ISIS enslaving young girls. One of the images was taken years before ISIS came into existence and appeared to be from an Ashura procession, while another turned out to be a picture staged by actors in London, England.

In April 2015, Kenney announced that troops from the Canadian Armed Forces would be sent to Ukraine as trainers for Ukrainian forces as part of Operation UNIFIER. The soldiers, who arrived in September 2015, were from 2 Canadian Mechanized Brigade Group (2 CMBG) and were stationed in at the Ukrainian Armed Forces International Peacekeeping and Security Centre near the Polish–Ukrainian border at Yavoriv.

In May 2015, after a report was published on sexual misconduct in the Canadian Forces, Kenney promised that an independent centre at arm's length from the military would be formed to hear complaints of sexual misconduct in the military and provide support and resources for victims.

== Return to opposition and entry into provincial politics ==
Although the Conservatives were defeated at the 2015 federal election, Kenney was reelected in Calgary Midnapore, essentially a reconfigured version of his old riding, where he was named to the Special Committee on Electoral Reform. Kenney was long considered a likely candidate to succeed Stephen Harper as leader of the Conservative Party of Canada, and had been mentioned as a prospective candidate and presumed frontrunner in the next leadership election to be held in 2017. His name was also mentioned as a prospective leader of the Progressive Conservative Party of Alberta (PC) who could potentially unite the rival Progressive Conservative and Wildrose parties. On July 6, 2016, Kenney announced that he would be seeking the leadership of the Alberta PC Party, citing his desire to unite Alberta's two major centre-right parties. The following day, he announced that he would resign his seat in the House of Commons within three months once the leadership campaign period officially opened, a decision that was severely criticized by the Canadian Taxpayers Federation, which Kenney had previously lead, for misusing taxpayer dollars. He officially resigned September 23.

Kenney was elected leader of the PCs on March 18, 2017, with more than 75% of the delegate votes on the first ballot. He re-affirmed his pledge to unite the party with the rival Wildrose Party. Two months later, on May 18, the PC and Wildrose party announced a merger agreement that would be voted by on their respective memberships. The results, announced June 22, had 95% of Wildrose and PC members vote in favour of a merger. The new United Conservative Party was recognized as the Official Opposition by the Legislative Assembly of Alberta on July 25, 2017, and shortly thereafter registered with Elections Alberta. Nathan Cooper named interim leader while the party organized a leadership election. However, as Alberta law forbade political parties from transferring assets, the PC and Wildrose parties continued to exist on paper, and the UCP was formally a newly created party.

On October 28, 2017, the party's inaugural leadership election was held. Kenney was elected as the first full-time leader of the party, defeating former Wildrose leader Brian Jean and lawyer Doug Schweitzer. The following day, MLA Dave Rodney announced his resignation of his seat of Calgary-Lougheed in order to create a vacancy for Kenney. Kenney was elected as MLA on December 14, and sworn in as Leader of the Opposition on January 29, 2018.

=== "Kamikaze campaign" scandal ===
The Royal Canadian Mounted Police and the Alberta Election Commissioner investigated allegations that Jason Kenney and his team were involved in orchestrating Jeff Callaway's campaign for the leadership of the United Conservative Party in an attempt to harm Kenney's biggest rival, Brian Jean. Documents obtained by The Star confirm that Kenney's campaign controlled major aspects of Callaway's campaign, including the providing of strategic plans, attack ads, speeches, and talking points intended to discredit Jean. These documents were handed over the election commissioner, according to Callaway's former campaign manager Cameron Davies. Davies also said that Kenney had attended a meeting at Callaway's house in July 2017, where the "kamikaze campaign" was discussed, and that Kenney had firsthand knowledge of this strategy.

A leaked document alleged that Jason Kenney's team first approached Derek Fildebrandt in July 2017 about running a "dark-horse" campaign, but ultimately decided against working with him. Fildebrandt confirmed this account but stated that it was he who rejected the idea.

An emergency injunction was sought to halt the probe into the financing of Callaway's UCP leadership campaign for the duration of the 2019 Alberta general election, but was denied by Court of Queen's Bench Justice Anne Kirker, who ruled it was in the public interest for the investigation to continue.

CBC News and CTV News received documents indicating that fraudulent e-mail addresses attached to party memberships were used to cast ballots in the party's leadership race in 2017, which Jason Kenney won. CBC News picked a sample of e-mail addresses based on suspicious domains, and determined that 60% of those were used to cast ballots in the leadership election.

Former UCP MLA Prab Gill sent a letter to the RCMP outlining allegations that the Kenney leadership campaign used fraudulent e-mail addresses to intercept PINs needed to vote in the leadership race, and that they were subsequently used by the Kenney campaign to vote for Kenney.

Many of the suspicious domains were traced to a network with ever-changing domains, and it is unclear who registered these domains. The majority of the fraudulent e-mail addresses were registered in the weeks preceding the leadership vote. CBC noted that it is not clear how widespread the voting fraud is outside of their selected sample of suspicious domains, and it is also possible that common e-mail providers such as Gmail or Hotmail were used with fraudulent addresses. A dozen individuals were contacted by CBC News to confirm whether or not they voted in the race, all of whom confirmed that they did not vote in the race and the e-mails on the voter's list were not their true e-mails.

The RCMP went to question at least one family to speak with them regarding the allegations of voter fraud.

== Premier of Alberta (2019–2022) ==
Under Kenney's leadership, the United Conservative Party won a majority government in the 2019 Alberta general election, winning 63 seats and 54.88% of the popular vote in 2019 election. On April 30, 2019, Kenney was sworn in by Lieutenant Governor Lois Mitchell, becoming the 18th Premier of Alberta.

During the first session of the 30th Alberta Legislature, the Kenney government passed several notable of pieces of legislation, including the Act to Repeal the Carbon Tax, the Alberta Corporate Tax Amendment, and the Public Sector Wage Arbitration Deferral Act. The government also passed legislation allowing parties to merge, clearing the way for PC and Wildrose to legally and formally merge into the UCP, and hence dissolve. Premier Kenney established a one-year, $2.5 million Public Inquiry into Anti-Alberta Energy Campaigns and a Calgary-based $30 million 'war room' to "fight misinformation related to oil and gas". They announced their first provincial budget on October 24, 2019, which fulfilled their "promise of slight austerity" with "cuts to spending programs and the elimination of hundreds of bureaucracy jobs", according to The National Post. The Post said that these and the corporate tax cuts "were the key planks of a four-year plan to bring the budget into balance." The goal is to reduce government spending by $4-billion over four years.

=== Oil Sands lawsuit ===
On February 2, 2022, five environmental organizations filed a lawsuit in Edmonton against Kenney for defamation. The lawsuit alleged that, in public statements and in social media posts, Kenney deliberately distorted the results of a public inquiry led by Calgary forensic accountant Steve Allan investigating the possibility that the groups accepted American money to spread misinformation about the environmental impacts of oil sands development in Alberta. They were represented in the filing by Paul Champ of Ottawa-based Champ & Associates.

=== Leadership tensions and resignation ===
On March 8, 2021, CBC News reported that following discontent about the travel controversy and government policies around pandemic measures and coal mining, several UCP constituency associations had discussed holding a leadership review at an upcoming convention, putting Kenney's leadership of the party to a vote. On March 13, the UCP announced a leadership review will be held at the party's annual general meeting in 2022, expected to be held in October, six months ahead of the fixed election date for the next Alberta general election.

On April 7, 2021, 15 UCP MLAs, including former Minister of Municipal Affairs Tracy Allard and Speaker Nathan Cooper, signed a letter criticizing the Government's public health orders. Two other MLAs added their names to the letter after it had been released publicly. UCP MLA Dan Williams also released a video criticizing the closure of GraceLife Church by Alberta Health Services. Kenney stated that Government MLAs were permitted to dissent over COVID-19 health restrictions but breaking health rules or encouraging others to do so would result in their expulsion from the Government Caucus. This was described as a "revolt" and an unprecedented level of opposition from within a government caucus. During a three-hour caucus meeting following the release of the letter, Kenney reportedly threatened to ask the lieutenant governor to dissolve the legislature and call a snap election if dissidents did not support the government.

On April 22, 2021, a letter calling for the resignation of Premier Kenney, started circulating within the UCP party's leadership boards. The letter gained 90 signatures composed of board presidents and board members of UCP riding associations. The letter states that the boards believed that they did not believe Kenney had the moral authority or trustworthiness to lead this party into the next election or to continue to deliver on important conservative priorities and that for the sake of a strong and free Alberta and for the well-being of the conservative movement in this province, the boards ask that Kenney do the proper thing and resign. The petitioners will bring up the letter during an upcoming board meeting.

On May 13, 2021, MLA Todd Loewen stepped down from his role as UCP caucus chair and called on Jason Kenney to resign, citing "persistent issues of dysfunction within the government" and claiming that "the Premier chooses not listen to caucus".

On September 22, 2021, MLA RJ Sigurdson presented a motion of no-confidence at a UCP caucus meeting, after the government introduced new public health restrictions, including a vaccine passport, following a fourth wave of the COVID-19 pandemic in Alberta. The motion was withdrawn after it was agreed that the UCP would hold a leadership review in Spring 2022, rather than October 2022 as previously scheduled.

On May 18, 2022, Jason Kenney narrowly won a confidence vote held by the UCP with 51.4% support from members of his party. He then announced on the same evening his intention to resign as premier of Alberta and leader of the UCP, citing the clearly divisive nature of his leadership and a need for party unity. He subsequently confirmed that he would not be candidate in the leadership election to succeed himself.

== Post-premiership ==
On November 29, 2022, Jason Kenney resigned as MLA for Calgary-Lougheed, with immediate effect. On February 1, 2023, Kenney announced that he had started a new job as senior advisor for the law firm, Bennett Jones.

His seat was retained by Eric Bouchard of the UCP in the May 2023 Alberta general election.

Jason Kenney was nominated to the board of ATCO on March 31, 2023.

Kenney joined former premier Rachel Notley to campaign for remain in the 2026 Alberta independence referendum.

== Political positions ==
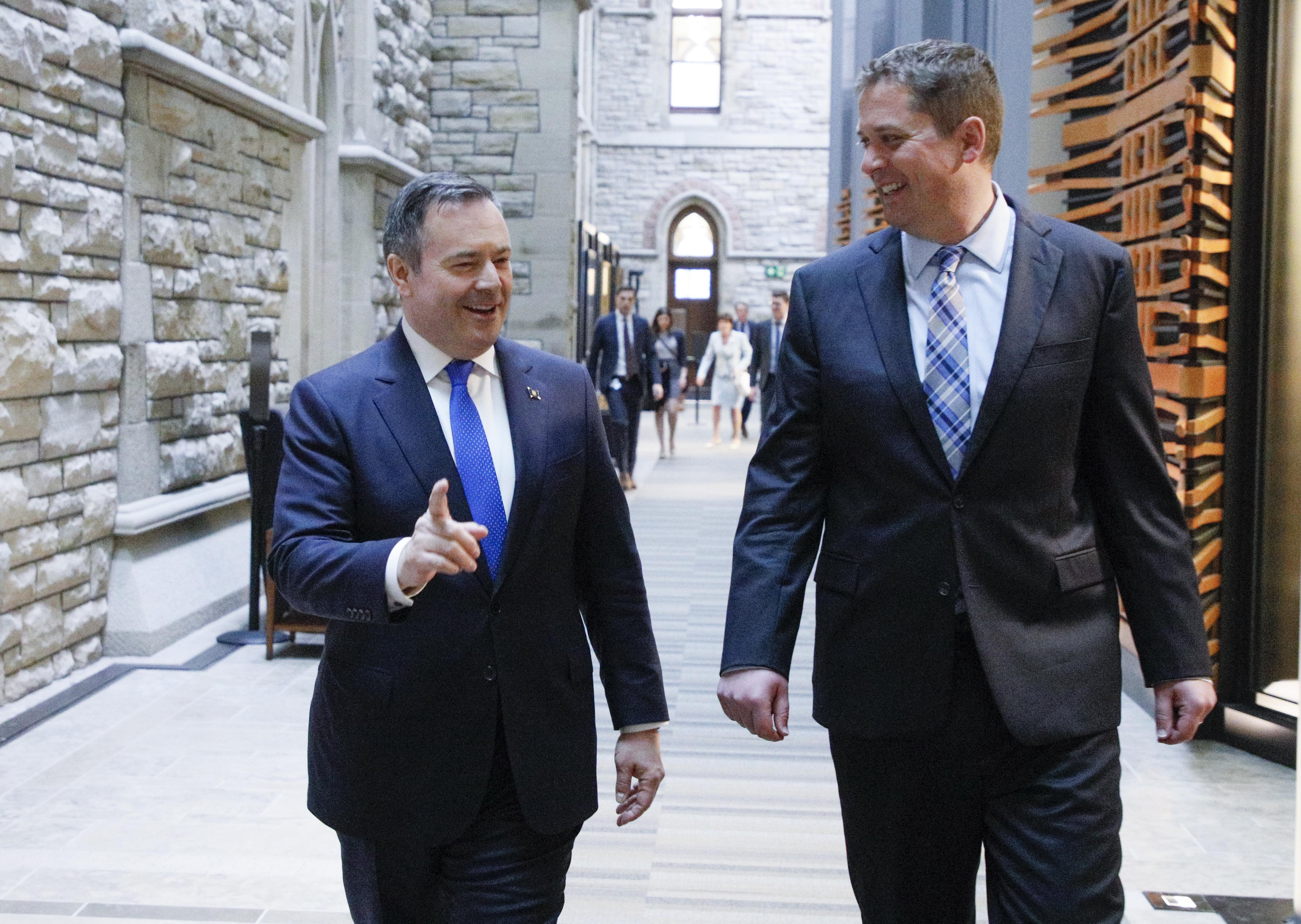
Kenney with Andrew Scheer in 2019.

Kenney has been a social conservative in his political career, voting in favor of abortion restrictions and against same-sex marriage.

=== Abortion ===
Kenney voted in favour of abortion restrictions and received an endorsement from the socially conservative lobbyist group Campaign Life Coalition. In 2012, Kenney was one of ten Cabinet ministers who voted in favour of a motion to study when life begins. In 2018, a bill to create "no-protest zones" around abortion clinics was introduced to the Alberta legislature, following similar legislation in Ontario, Quebec, British Columbia, and Newfoundland and Labrador. As leader of the UCP, Kenney refused to debate the bill and led his caucus to walk out of the house 14 times over the course of two months when the bill was at issue.

=== LGBTQ issues ===
Kenney voted against same-sex marriage as an MP, saying, "A majority of Canadians support the provision of benefits on grounds such as domestic partnership relationships, which are grounded on unions of economic dependency rather than relationships of a mere conjugal nature, and yet still two-thirds of Canadians, from every culture that exists in this country, from every corner of the globe who have come to this country to build a future for themselves and their families, recognize that marriage is, as the Supreme Court said the last time it spoke to this issue in the Egan case in 1995, 'by nature a heterosexual institution'."

In 2016, Kenney supported the removal of "traditional definition of marriage" from the conservative party policy book.

Kenney was criticized by the provincial NDP, some LGBTQ activists, and some journalists for saying in a Postmedia interview that parents generally have a right to know if their child has joined a Gay-Straight Alliance, unless it would be contrary to the best interests of the child in the circumstances.

In November 2018, Kenney faced pressure to expel an outspoken member of the United Conservative Party who compared the gay pride flag to the flag of Nazi Germany. Although Kenney had previously directed the party to cancel the membership of another member, he said that the decision to expel members rested with the party's board.

A two-decade-old audio recording surfaced in December 2018 of Kenney boasting about overturning a gay marriage law in 1989 in San Francisco. Kenney was referring to his role in organizing a petition to repeal the city ordinance that extended recognition rights of heterosexual couples to same-sex couples. This ordinance, originating during the 1980s AIDS epidemic, extended rights that were previously exclusive to heterosexual couples, such as hospital visitation, to same-sex couples. Kenney addressed the audio clip by stating that he regrets the comments he made and that, since then, his record shows he supports domestic partner arrangements and benefits for couples regardless of sexual orientation. The comments led to backlash from outside and within the United Conservative Party. One board member and campaign manager for the party resigned his positions and membership with the party, citing the audio recording of Kenney as his reason for departure.

=== Minority outreach ===
Kenney was widely recognized for his central role in reaching out to ethnic minority voters in 2011, leading to the Conservative Party's successful election campaign, and the Conservative parliamentary majority that resulted. He publicly acknowledged that his ongoing strategy of promoting conservative values and policies in government so as to capture the support of ethnic communities was in the works beginning years prior to Stephen Harper first winning government in 2006. Kenney also suggested that Harper was one of the first people he consulted with on the ethnic outreach strategy, when the latter was still an opposition Canadian Alliance MP.

Kenney's ethnic outreach strategy was also evident when, in early 2011, a letter using government stationery was sent to Conservative riding associations seeking assistance in raising $200,000 funding for an ad campaign aimed at bolstering support among ethnic communities in ridings that the Conservatives were targeting in the next election. News of this broke when a copy was believed to have been mistakenly sent to the office of opposition MP Linda Duncan instead of that of fellow Conservative MP John Duncan (no relation). This led to criticism over the letter's labelling of certain groups and ridings as "ethnic" or "very ethnic". Kenney publicly apologized for the mailing error, citing a staffer's inexperience for the mistake.

As immigration minister, Kenney was largely credited with building bridges attracting ethnic communities to the Conservative Party, which was long dominated by the Liberal Party. In addition, he also handled the apology and financial compensation for the Chinese head tax and the official recognition of the Armenian and Ukrainian genocides. According to an observer, "He acts as a conductor to correct historical wrongs, It might not seem important to the majority of the population, but for the concerned communities, it's huge." According to The Globe and Mail, the Chinese–Canadian community nicknamed Kenney the "Smiling Buddha" in reference to his efforts to garner ethnic votes on the basis of what some perceive as commonly held conservative values. The Toronto Star characterized him as having a "Bieber-like" following in many communities. Kenney justified his efforts to gain ethnic support by stating, "You observe how these new Canadians live their lives. They are the personification of Margaret Thatcher's aspirational class. They're all about a massive work ethic."

== Personal life ==
Kenney is bilingual, speaking French and English. He has never been married and has no children.

== Awards and recognition ==
Kenney received the Queen Elizabeth II Golden Jubilee Medal in 2002, the Queen Elizabeth II Diamond Jubilee Medal in 2012, and the Albertan version of the Queen Elizabeth II Platinum Jubilee Medal in 2022.

In 2004, Kenney was named one of Canada's "100 Leaders of the Future" by Maclean's magazine, "one of Canada's leading conservative activists" by The Globe and Mail, and one of "21 Canadians to watch in the 21st century" by the Financial Post.

On May 13, 2009, Maclean's, in association with the Dominion Institute, L'actualité, and presenting sponsor Enbridge, presented Kenney with the award for "Best Overall MP".

Maclean's named Kenney the "hardest working" MP of 2011, citing overwhelming support from all political parties who recognized Kenney's constant "20-hour work days" and "permanent 5 o'clock shadow".

On November 4, 2012, he received an honorary doctorate from the University of Haifa.

In 2014, Kenney received the UN Watch Moral Courage Award for speaking out on behalf of those who had been victimized by international tyranny. At the ceremony in Geneva, representatives of the 14th Dalai Lama presented Kenney with a traditional Tibetan scarf. Also in 2014, Kenney was awarded the inaugural Benjamin Disraeli Prize by Policy Exchange, a centre-right UK think tank, in recognition of the successful outreach to Canada's ethnic and cultural communities. The award was presented by British Conservative cabinet minister Michael Gove.

In August 2016, President Petro Poroshenko of Ukraine awarded Jason Kenney with an Order of Merit, Third Class.

Ribbon	Description	Notes
	Queen Elizabeth II Golden Jubilee Medal	Decoration awarded in 2002; Canadian version
	Queen Elizabeth Diamond Jubilee Medal	Decoration awarded in 2012; Canadian version
	Queen Elizabeth II Platinum Jubilee Medal	Decoration awarded in 2022; Alberta version
	Order of Merit (Ukraine)	Decoration awarded in August 2016; Third Class

In 2025 Kenney was awarded the Tryzyb Award from Ukrainian diaspora in Canada as a "Friend of Ukraine"

== Electoral record ==
2019 Alberta general election: Calgary-Lougheed
Party	Candidate	Votes	%	±%	Expenditures
United Conservative	Jason Kenney	11,633	65.70	+3.19	$44,704
New Democratic	Julia Bietz	4,334	24.48	-7.52	$6,631
Alberta Party	Rachel Timmermans	1,365	7.71	+6.84	$9,945
Liberal	Wilson McCutchan	219	1.24	-3.39	$500
Alberta Independence	Peter De Jonk	101	0.57	–	$500
Independent	Larry R Heather	55	0.31	–	$500
Total		17,707	99.20	–	
Rejected, spoiled and declined		142	0.80		
Turnout		17,849	65.99		
Eligible voters		27,046			
United Conservative notional hold		Swing		+5.35	
Source(s) Source: Elections Alberta Note: Expenses is the sum of "Election Expenses", "Other Expenses" and "Transfers Issued". The Elections Act limits "Election Expenses" to $50,000.

^ Change is calculated from redistributed 2015 results.

Alberta provincial by-election, December 14, 2017: Calgary-Lougheed Resignation of Dave Rodney
Party	Candidate	Votes	%	±%
United Conservative	Jason Kenney	7,760	71.51	+8.35 (Note: Swing is calculated from the sum of Progressive Conservative and Wildrose vote shares.)
New Democratic	Phillip van der Merwe	1,822	16.79	−15.24
Liberal	David Khan	1,009	9.30	+4.49
Reform	Lauren Thorsteinson	137	1.26	–
Green	Romy Tittel	60	0.55	–
Independent	Wayne Leslie	42	0.39	–
Independent	Larry Heather	22	0.20	–
Total valid votes		10,852	–	–
Rejected, spoiled and declined		28	2	96
Eligible voters / turnout		31,067	35.03	−16.32
United Conservative notional hold		Swing		+11.80
Source(s) Elections Alberta

2015 Canadian federal election: Calgary Midnapore
Party	Candidate	Votes	%	±%	Expenditures
Conservative	Jason Kenney	42,415	66.73	−9.17	$67,515.08
Liberal	Haley Brown	14,396	22.65	+16.24	$11,213.46
New Democratic	Laura Weston	4,915	7.73	−2.82	$18,349.56
Green	Brennan Wauters	1,691	2.66	−3.77	$4,520.21
Marxist–Leninist	Peggy Askin	145	0.23	–	–
Total valid votes/Expense limit		63,562	100.00		$226,378.18
Total rejected ballots		179	0.28	–	
Turnout		63,741	73.13	–	
Eligible voters		87,158			
Conservative hold		Swing		–12.71	
Source: Elections Canada

2011 Canadian federal election: Calgary Southeast
Party	Candidate	Votes	%	±%	Expenditures
Conservative	Jason Kenney	48,173	76.26	+2.43	$54,158
New Democratic	Kirk Oates	6,482	10.26	+3.07	$0.05
Green	Brett Spencer	4,079	6.46	−3.80	$5,584
Liberal	Brian MacPhee	4,020	6.36	−2.36	$11,237
Independent	Antoni Grochowski	225	0.36	*	
Western Block	Paul Fromm	193	0.31	*	$5,393
Total valid votes/Expense limit		63,172	100.00	–	$104,090
Total rejected ballots		129	0.20	–	
Turnout		63,301	60.32	–	
Eligible voters		104,941	–	–	
Conservative hold		Swing		+3.12	

2008 Canadian federal election: Calgary Southeast
Party	Candidate	Votes	%	±%	Expenditures
Conservative	Jason Kenney	41,322	73.83	−1.35	$40,322
Green	Margaret Chandler	5,744	10.26	+3.45	$3,529
Liberal	Brad Carroll	4,880	8.72	−1.63	
New Democratic	Chris Willott	4,024	7.19	−0.48	$5,082
Total valid votes/Expense limit		55,970	100.00	$96,650	
Total rejected ballots		–	–		
Turnout		–	–		
Conservative hold		Swing		−2.40	

2006 Canadian federal election: Calgary Southeast
Party	Candidate	Votes	%	±%	Expenditures
Conservative	Jason Kenney	44,987	75.18	+4.19	$46,829
Liberal	James Ludwar	6,193	10.35	−6.00	$9,186
New Democratic	Eric Leavitt	4,584	7.67	+1.09	$2,949
Green	Gus Gutoski	4,076	6.81	+0.76	$1,535
Total valid votes		59,840	100.00		
Total rejected ballots		120	0.20		
Turnout		59,960	67.08		
Conservative hold		Swing		+5.10	

2004 Canadian federal election: Calgary Southeast
Party	Candidate	Votes	%	±%	Expenditures
Conservative	Jason Kenney	36,843	70.99	−13.06	$47,525
Liberal	Jim Tanner	8,488	16.35	+4.17	$23,178
New Democratic	Brian Pincott	3,419	6.58	+4.55	$2,401
Green	George Read	3,142	6.05	+4.35	$1,193
Canadian Action	Trevor Grover	274	0.53	–	
Total valid votes		51,892	100.00		
Total rejected ballots		119	0.23		
Turnout		52,011	63.72		
Conservative hold		Swing		−8.62	

2000 Canadian federal election: Calgary Southeast
Party	Candidate	Votes	%	±%	Expenditures
Alliance	Jason Kenney	34,492	63.24	+8.22	$41,614
Progressive Conservative	Ray Clark	11,353	20.81	−2.82	$9,884
Liberal	Dana Peace	6,646	12.18	−6.00	$18,677
New Democratic	Giorgio Cattabeni	1,111	2.03	−0.60	$490
Green	James Stephen Kohut	931	1.70	–	
Total valid votes		54,533	100.00		
Total rejected ballots		116	0.21		
Turnout		54,649	63.89		
Alliance hold		Swing		−5.52	

1997 Canadian federal election: Calgary Southeast
Party	Candidate	Votes	%	±%	Expenditures
Reform	Jason Kenney	24,602	55.02	−4.83	$54,180
Progressive Conservative	Carol Kraychy	10,567	23.63	+3.51	$60,861
Liberal	Patti-Anne Kay	8,131	18.18	+4.55	$43,986
New Democratic	Jason Ness	1,176	2.63	−0.74	$524
Natural Law	Neeraj Varma	235	0.52	−0.27	
Total valid votes		44,711	100.00		
Total rejected ballots		79	0.18		
Turnout		44,790	63.69		
Reform hold		Swing		−4.17	
