= David Khan (politician) =

Canadian politician

Leader of the Alberta Liberal Party
- In office June 4, 2017 – November 22, 2020
- Preceded by: David Swann (interim)
- Succeeded by: John Roggeveen (interim)

Personal details
- Born: 1974 or 1975 (age 51–52) Calgary, Alberta, Canada
- Party: Liberal
- Education: University of British Columbia; University of Toronto
- Profession: Constitutional Lawyer

David Khan (born May 17, 1974) is a Canadian politician who led the Alberta Liberal Party from 2017 to 2020. Prior to running for leader, he served as the party's executive vice-president. He was elected leader on June 4, 2017.

== Political positions ==
Khan did not support co-operation with the Alberta Party, but did support forging closer ties with the Liberal Party of Canada. His leadership platform included a basic income pilot project, elimination of the small business tax, proportional representation for the Legislature, more free votes for MLAs, bringing private schools into the public system, and establishing universal pharmacare for those under 24.

== Personal life ==
Born in Calgary, Khan's father was an immigrant to Canada from Pakistan while his mother is English. Professionally, Khan is a lawyer who practices indigenous law and is fluently bilingual in both English and French. He is the first openly gay leader of a major Alberta political party.

== Election results ==
He was previously the party's 2014 by-election candidate in Calgary-West and 2015 provincial election candidate in Calgary-Buffalo, finishing third both times. Khan was also the Liberal candidate in the December 14, 2017 by-election in Calgary-Lougheed. He again placed third, behind United Conservative Party leader Jason Kenney and the NDP candidate. Under his leadership, the Alberta Liberal Party experienced its worst results in history in the 2019 provincial election.

=== 2019 general election ===
2019 Alberta general election: Calgary-Mountain View
Party	Candidate	Votes	%	±%
New Democratic	Kathleen Ganley	12,526	47.32%	18.45%
United Conservative	Jeremy Wong	9,708	36.68%	2.24%
Alberta Party	Angela Kokott	2,345	8.86%	–
Liberal	David Khan	1,474	5.57%	-31.10%
Green	Thana Boonlert	315	1.19%	–
Alberta Independence	Monica Friesz	102	0.39%	–
Total		26,470	–	–
Rejected, spoiled and declined		203	86	7
Eligible electors / turnout		38,316	69.63%	15.24%
New Democratic gain from Liberal		Swing		1.43%
Source(s) Source: "18 - Calgary-Mountain View, 2019 Alberta general election". officialresults.elections.ab.ca. Elections Alberta.

=== 2017 by-election ===
Alberta provincial by-election, December 14, 2017: Calgary-Lougheed Resignation of Dave Rodney
Party	Candidate	Votes	%	±%
United Conservative	Jason Kenney	7,760	71.51	+8.35 (Note: Swing is calculated from the sum of Progressive Conservative and Wildrose vote shares.)
New Democratic	Phillip van der Merwe	1,822	16.79	−15.24
Liberal	David Khan	1,009	9.30	+4.49
Reform	Lauren Thorsteinson	137	1.26	–
Green	Romy Tittel	60	0.55	–
Independent	Wayne Leslie	42	0.39	–
Independent	Larry Heather	22	0.20	–
Total valid votes		10,852	–	–
Rejected, spoiled and declined		28	2	96
Eligible voters / turnout		31,067	35.03	−16.32
United Conservative notional hold		Swing		+11.80
Source(s) Elections Alberta

=== 2015 general election ===
2015 Alberta general election: Calgary-Buffalo
Party	Candidate	Votes	%	±%	Expenditures
New Democratic	Kathleen T. Ganley	4,671	35.11%	30.39%	$3,118
Progressive Conservative	Terry Rock	3,738	28.09%	-2.58%	$92,068
Liberal	David Khan	3,282	24.67%	-16.80%	$54,749
Wildrose	Leah Wamboldt	1,351	10.15%	-10.97%	$2,900
Green	Sabrina Lee Levac	263	1.98%	–	$500
Total		13,305	–	–	–
Rejected, spoiled and declined		162	–	–	–
Eligible electors / turnout		32,950	40.87%	-3.39%	–
New Democratic gain from Liberal		Swing		-1.89%	
Source(s) Source: "05 - Calgary-Buffalo, 2015 Alberta general election". officialresults.elections.ab.ca. Elections Alberta. "2015-2016 Annual Report of the Chief Electoral Officer" (PDF). Elections Alberta.

=== 2014 by-election ===
Alberta provincial by-election, October 27, 2014: Calgary-West Resignation of Ken Hughes on September 26, 2014
Party	Candidate	Votes	%	±%
Progressive Conservative	Mike Ellis	4,836	44.29	−5.56
Wildrose	Sheila Taylor	4,530	41.58	+4.25
Liberal	David Khan	927	8.51	+1.05
New Democratic	Brian Malkinson	337	3.09	+0.08
Alberta Party	Troy Millington	264	2.42	+1.45
Total		10,894	—	—
Rejected, spoiled and declined		17	7	1
Eligible electors / turnout		30,541	35.73	—
Progressive Conservative hold		Swing		−
Source(s) Alberta. Chief Electoral Officer (2015). Report on the October 27, 2014 By-elections in: Calgary-Elbow, Calgary-Foothills, Calgary-West, Edmonton-Whitemud (PDF) (Report). Edmonton: Legislative Assembly of Alberta; Chief Electoral Officer. ISBN 978-098653678-6.
