= Marlene Graham =

Canadian politician and judge

MLA for Calgary-Lougheed
- In office March 11, 1997 – November 22, 2004
- Preceded by: Jim Dinning
- Succeeded by: Dave Rodney

Personal details
- Born: May 31, 1953 (age 72) Red Deer, Alberta
- Party: Progressive Conservative

Marlene Graham (born May 31, 1953) is a judge and a former provincial level politician from Alberta, Canada. She served as a member of the Legislative Assembly of Alberta from 1997 until 2004.

== Political career ==
Graham was first elected to the Legislative Assembly of Alberta in the 1997 Alberta general election as a Progressive Conservative member for Calgary-Lougheed. She served 2 terms as MLA and resigned in 2004. During her time in office she did a lot of work revising the Alberta Family Law system.

After leaving politics, she was appointed as a provincial judge.
