= Calgary-Lougheed =

Provincial electoral district in Alberta, Canada

Coordinates: 50.91°N 114.13°W

Alberta electoral district
- Calgary-Lougheed within the City of Calgary, 2017 boundaries

Provincial electoral district
- Legislature: Legislative Assembly of Alberta
MLA
Eric Bouchard
United Conservative
- District created: 1993
- First contested: 1993
- Last contested: 2023

Demographics
- Population (2016): 42,253
- Census division(s): Division No. 6
- Census subdivision(s): Calgary

Calgary-Lougheed is a provincial electoral district in Alberta, Canada. It is one of 87 districts mandated to return a single member to the Legislative Assembly of Alberta using the first-past-the-post method of voting.

The district is primarily urban, and it exists on the suburban fringes of the city of Calgary. It was created in the 1993 boundary redistribution from Calgary-Shaw, and is named in honour of former premier Peter Lougheed, who held the nearby seat of Calgary West from 1967 to 1986.

The district has been a stronghold for Progressive Conservative candidates since it was created. The current MLA for this riding is Eric Bouchard of the United Conservative Party. The riding was vacant for a period following the resignation of the former premier of Alberta, Jason Kenney of the United Conservative Party. The first MLA was Jim Dinning, who previously represented Calgary-Shaw.

The district contains the neighbourhoods of Bridlewood, Millrise, Shawnee, Evergreen, Evergreen Estates, Alpine Park, and Vermilion Hills.

== History ==
The electoral district was created in the 1993 boundary redistribution from Calgary-Shaw and Highwood. In the 2010 Boundary redistribution all land east of 14 Street was cut out of the riding and given to Shaw and Calgary-Fish Creek.

=== Boundary history ===
14 Calgary-Lougheed 2003 boundaries
Bordering districts
| North | East | West | South |
|---|---|---|---|
| Calgary-Glenmore | Calgary-Fish Creek and Calgary-Shaw | Foothills-Rocky View | Foothills-Rocky View |
| riding map goes here | | | |
Legal description from the Statutes of Alberta 2003, Electoral Divisions Act.
14 Calgary - Lougheed Starting at the intersection of the west Calgary city boundary with Anderson Road SW; then 1. east along Anderson Road SW to Elbow Drive SW; 2. south along Elbow Drive SW to Canyon Meadows Drive SW; 3. southeasterly along Canyon Meadows Drive SW to Macleod Trail S; 4. south along Macleod Trail S to Shawnessy Boulevard SW; 5. west along Shawnessy Boulevard SW to James McKevitt Road SW; 6. south along James McKevitt Road SW and 14 Street SW to the city boundary; 7. generally west, north, east and north along the city boundary to the starting point.
Note:

18 Calgary-Lougheed 2010 boundaries
Bordering districts
| North | East | West | South |
|---|---|---|---|
| Calgary-Acadia and Calgary-Glenmore | Calgary-Fish Creek, Calgary-Shaw and Calgary-South East | Chestermere-Rocky View | Highwood and Livingstone-Macleod |
Legal description from the Statutes of Alberta 2010, Electoral Divisions Act.

=== Representation history ===
Members of the Legislative Assembly for Calgary-Lougheed
| Assembly | Years | Member | Party |
|---|---|---|---|
See Calgary-Shaw 1986-1993 and Highwood 1971-1993
| 23rd | 1993-1997 | Jim Dinning | Progressive; Conservative |
| 24th | 1997-2001 | Marlene Graham | Progressive; Conservative |
| 25th | 2001-2004 | Marlene Graham | Progressive; Conservative |
| 26th | 2004-2008 | Dave Rodney | Progressive; Conservative |
| 27th | 2008-2012 | Dave Rodney | Progressive; Conservative |
| 28th | 2012-2015 | Dave Rodney | Progressive; Conservative |
| 29th | 2015-2017 | Dave Rodney | Progressive; Conservative |
| 29th | 2017 | Dave Rodney | United Conservative |
| 29th | 2017 | Vacant | |
| 29th | 2017-2019 | Jason Kenney | United Conservative |
| 30th | 2019-2022 | Jason Kenney | United Conservative |
| 30th | 2022-2023 | Vacant | |
| 31st | 2023–present | Eric Bouchard | United Conservative |

The electoral district was created from Calgary-Shaw in the 1993 boundary redistribution. The first election held that year saw incumbent Progressive Conservative MLA Jim Dinning defeat Liberal candidate Jack Driscoll and three other candidates. Dinning retired from the legislature in 1997.

The 1997 election saw Progressive Conservative candidate Marlene Graham elected with a landslide majority. She was re-elected with a larger margin in the 2001 general election and retired at dissolution in 2004.

The 2004 election saw Progressive Conservative candidate Dave Rodney win a very large majority to hold the seat for his party. He was easily re-elected in 2008 and 2012.

In 2015, however, Rodney barely held the seat in a close three-way race against NDP and Wildrose challengers. In 2017, the Progressive Conservative and Wildrose parties merged to form the United Conservative Party, which Rodney joined. He subsequently resigned his seat to allow party leader Jason Kenney to run in a by-election. Kenney was elected by a wide margin over the NDP candidate and Liberal leader David Khan.

== Legislative election results ==
=== 2023 ===
2023 Alberta general election
| Party | Candidate | Votes | % | ±% |
|---|---|---|---|---|
| United Conservative | Eric Bouchard | 9,690 | 56.45 | -9.25 |
| New Democratic | Venkat Ravulaparthi | 6,924 | 40.33 | +15.86 |
| Liberal | John Roggeveen | 369 | 2.15 | +0.91 |
| Solidarity Movement | Nathaniel Pawlowski | 184 | 1.07 | – |
| Total | | 17,167 | 99.18 | – |
| Rejected and declined | | 142 | 0.82 | |
| Turnout | | 17,309 | 60.06 | |
| Eligible voters | | 28,818 | | |
| United Conservative hold | | Swing | | -12.55 |
Source(s) Source: Elections Alberta

=== 2019 ===
2019 Alberta general election
| Party | Candidate | Votes | % | ±% | Expenditures |
|---|---|---|---|---|---|
| United Conservative | Jason Kenney | 11,633 | 65.70 | +3.19 | $44,704 |
| New Democratic | Julia Bietz | 4,334 | 24.48 | -7.52 | $6,631 |
| Alberta Party | Rachel Timmermans | 1,365 | 7.71 | +6.84 | $9,945 |
| Liberal | Wilson McCutchan | 219 | 1.24 | -3.39 | $500 |
| Alberta Independence | Peter De Jonk | 101 | 0.57 | – | $500 |
| Independent | Larry R Heather | 55 | 0.31 | – | $500 |
| Total | | 17,707 | 99.20 | – | |
| Rejected, spoiled and declined | | 142 | 0.80 | | |
| Turnout | | 17,849 | 65.99 | | |
| Eligible voters | | 27,046 | | | |
| United Conservative notional hold | | Swing | | +5.35 | |
Source(s) Source: Elections Alberta Note: Expenses is the sum of "Election Expenses", "Other Expenses" and "Transfers Issued". The Elections Act limits "Election Expenses" to $50,000.

^ Change is calculated from redistributed 2015 results.

=== 2017 by-election ===
Alberta provincial by-election, December 14, 2017 Resignation of Dave Rodney
| Party | Candidate | Votes | % | ±% |
|---|---|---|---|---|
| United Conservative | Jason Kenney | 7,760 | 71.51 | +8.35 (Note: Swing is calculated from the sum of Progressive Conservative and Wildrose vote shares.) |
| New Democratic | Phillip van der Merwe | 1,822 | 16.79 | −15.24 |
| Liberal | David Khan | 1,009 | 9.30 | +4.49 |
| Reform | Lauren Thorsteinson | 137 | 1.26 | – |
| Green | Romy Tittel | 60 | 0.55 | – |
| Independent | Wayne Leslie | 42 | 0.39 | – |
| Independent | Larry Heather | 22 | 0.20 | – |
| Total valid votes | | 10,852 | – | – |
| Rejected, spoiled and declined | | 28 | 2 | 96 |
| Eligible voters / turnout | | 31,067 | 35.03 | −16.32 |
| United Conservative notional hold | | Swing | | +11.80 |
Source(s) Elections Alberta

=== 2015 ===
2015 Alberta general election
| Party | Candidate | Votes | % | ±% |
|---|---|---|---|---|
| Progressive Conservative | Dave Rodney | 5,939 | 34.99 | -15.22 |
| New Democratic | Mihai Ion | 5,437 | 32.03 | +28.07 |
| Wildrose | Mark Mantei | 4,781 | 28.17 | -10.24 |
| Liberal | Leila Keith | 817 | 4.81 | -2.61 |
| Total valid votes | | 16,974 | 98.54 | |
| Rejected, spoiled and declined | | 251 | 1.46 | +0.28 |
| Eligible electors/ turnout | | 33,547 | 51.35 | -0.52 |
| Progressive Conservative hold | | Swing | | -21.65 |
Source(s) "2015 Provincial General Election Results". Elections Alberta.

2015 Alberta general election redistributed results
| Party | Votes | % |
|---|---|---|
| Progressive Conservative | 4,473 | 34.59 |
| New Democratic | 4,138 | 32.00 |
| Wildrose | 3,611 | 27.92 |
| Liberal | 599 | 4.63 |
| Alberta Party | 112 | 0.87 |
Source(s) Source: Ridingbuilder

=== 2012 ===
2012 Alberta general election
| Party | Candidate | Votes | % | ±% |
|---|---|---|---|---|
| Progressive Conservative | Dave Rodney | 7,836 | 50.21 | -2.30 |
| Wildrose | John Carpay | 5,993 | 38.40 | +26.57 |
| Liberal | Fred Stenson | 1,159 | 7.43 | -21.25 |
| New Democratic | Brent Kelly | 618 | 3.96 | +1.51 |
| Total | | 15,606 | 98.82 | |
| Rejected, spoiled and declined | | 186 | 1.18 | +0.87 |
| Eligible electors / Turnout | | 30,445 | 51.87 | +12.71 |
| Progressive Conservative hold | | Swing | | -14.44 |
Source(s) "Electoral Division Results, Calgary-Lougheed".

=== 2008 ===
2008 Alberta general election
| Party | Candidate | Votes | % | ±% |
|---|---|---|---|---|
| Progressive Conservative | Dave Rodney | 7,190 | 52.51% | -7.33% |
| Liberal | Lori Czerwinski | 3,926 | 28.68% | +0.61% |
| Wildrose Alliance | Derrick Jacobson | 1,620 | 11.83% | +7.63% |
| Greens | Bernie Amell | 520 | 3.80% | -0.65% |
| New Democratic | Clint Marko | 336 | 2.45% | -0.99% |
| Independent | Keith Laurie | 100 | 0.73% | |
| Total | | 13,692 | 100.00% | |
| Rejected, spoiled and declined | | 42 | | |
| Eligible electors / Turnout | | 35,071 | 39.16% | -1.51% |
| Progressive Conservative hold | | Swing | | -3.97% |
Source(s) The Report on the March 3, 2008 Provincial General Election of the Twenty-seventh Legislative Assembly. Elections Alberta. July 28, 2008. pp. 222–225.

=== 2004 ===
2004 Alberta general election
| Party | Candidate | Votes | % | ±% |
|---|---|---|---|---|
| Progressive Conservative | Dave Rodney | 6,336 | 59.84% | -14.35% |
| Liberal | Al Pollock | 2,972 | 28.07% | +7.04% |
| Greens | Ryan Boucher | 471 | 4.45% | |
| Alberta Alliance | Tariq Khan | 445 | 4.20% | |
| New Democratic | Matt Koczkur | 365 | 3.44% | -1.34% |
| Total | | 10,589 | 100.00% | |
| Rejected, spoiled and declined | | 70 | | |
| Eligible electors / Turnout | | 26,209 | 40.67% | -14.15% |
| Progressive Conservative hold | | Swing | | -10.70% |
Source(s) "Calgary-Lougheed Statement of Official Results 2004 Alberta general election" (PDF). Elections Alberta.

=== 2001 ===
2001 Alberta general election
| Party | Candidate | Votes | % | ±% |
|---|---|---|---|---|
| Progressive Conservative | Marlene Graham | 8,952 | 74.19% | +8.19% |
| Liberal | Pete Montgomery | 2,538 | 21.03% | -3.68% |
| New Democratic | Marc Power | 577 | 4.78% | +0.25% |
| Total | | 12,067 | 100.00% | |
| Rejected, spoiled and declined | | 48 | | |
| Eligible electors / Turnout | | 22,099 | 54.82% | +0.43% |
| Progressive Conservative hold | | Swing | | +5.94% |
Source(s) "Calgary-Lougheed Official Results 2001 Alberta general election" (PDF). Elections Alberta.

=== 1997 ===
1997 Alberta general election
| Party | Candidate | Votes | % | ±% |
|---|---|---|---|---|
| Progressive Conservative | Marlene Graham | 7,761 | 66.00% | +13.23% |
| Liberal | Darryl Hawkins | 2,906 | 24.71% | -17.36% |
| Social Credit | Hub Blanchet | 560 | 4.76% | |
| New Democratic | Mara Vogel | 533 | 4.53% | +0.89% |
| Total | | 11,760 | 100.00% | |
| Rejected, spoiled and declined | | 20 | | |
| Eligible electors / Turnout | | 21,660 | 54.39% | -13.90% |
| Progressive Conservative hold | | Swing | | +15.30% |
Source(s) "1997 General Election". Elections Alberta. Archived from the original on February 14, 2012.

=== 1993 ===
1993 Alberta general election
| Party | Candidate | Votes | % |
|---|---|---|---|
| Progressive Conservative | Jim Dinning | 7,280 | 52.77% |
| Liberal | Jack Driscoll | 5,803 | 42.07% |
| New Democratic | Catherine Rose | 502 | 3.64% |
| Confederation of Regions | Peter Hope | 122 | 0.88% |
| Natural Law | Ida Bugmann | 88 | 0.64% |
| Total | | 13,795 | 100.00% |
| Rejected, spoiled and declined | | 20 | |
| Eligible electors / Turnout | | 20,231 | 68.29% |
| Progressive Conservative pickup new district. | | | |
Source(s) "Calgary-Lougheed results 1993 Alberta general election". Alberta Heritage Community Foundation.

== Senate nominee election results ==
=== 2004 ===
| 2004 Senate nominee election results: Calgary-Lougheed | | | | Turnout 40.76% | |
| Affiliation | Candidate | Votes | % votes | % ballots | Rank |
| Progressive Conservative | Bert Brown | 4,603 | 17.44% | 52.78% | 1 |
| Progressive Conservative | Jim Silye | 4,040 | 15.31% | 46.32% | 5 |
| Progressive Conservative | Betty Unger | 3,900 | 14.78% | 44.72% | 2 |
| Progressive Conservative | David Usherwood | 3,047 | 11.55% | 34.94% | 6 |
| Progressive Conservative | Cliff Breitkreuz | 2,473 | 9.37% | 28.35% | 3 |
| Independent | Link Byfield | 2,374 | 9.00% | 27.22% | 4 |
| Independent | Tom Sindlinger | 1,684 | 6.38% | 19.31% | 9 |
| Alberta Alliance | Michael Roth | 1,520 | 5.76% | 17.43% | 7 |
| Alberta Alliance | Vance Gough | 1,485 | 5.63% | 17.03% | 8 |
| Alberta Alliance | Gary Horan | 1,262 | 4.78% | 14.47% | 10 |
| Total votes | | 26,388 | 100% | | |
| Total ballots | | 8,722 | 3.03 votes per ballot | | |
| Rejected, spoiled and declined | | 1,960 | | | |
26,209 eligible electors

Voters had the option of selecting four candidates on the ballot

=== 2012 ===
2012 Senate nominee election results: Calgary-Lougheed
| Party | Candidate | Votes | % |
|---|---|---|---|
| Progressive Conservative | Doug Black | 5,447 | 17.74 |
| Progressive Conservative | Scott Tannas | 4,282 | 13.95 |
| Progressive Conservative | Mike Shaikh | 4,149 | 13.51 |
| Wildrose | Rob Gregory | 3,679 | 11.98 |
| Wildrose | Raymond Germain | 3,403 | 11.08 |
| Wildrose | Vitor Marciano | 2,964 | 9.65 |
| Independent | Len Bracko | 1,436 | 4.68 |
| Evergreen | Elizabeth Johannson | 1,332 | 4.34 |
| Independent | Ian Urquhart | 1,077 | 3.51 |
| Independent | Paul Frank | 910 | 2.96 |
| Independent | David Fletcher | 898 | 2.92 |
| Independent | William Exelby | 664 | 2.16 |
| Independent | Perry Chahal | 462 | 1.50 |
| Number of votes cast | | 30,703 | |
| Number of valid ballots | | 12,788 | 90.16 |
| Rejected, spoiled and declined | | 1,395 | 9.84 |
| Eligible electors/ Turnout | | 30,445 | 46.59 |
Source(s) "2012 Senate Nominee Election" (PDF). Elections Alberta.

== See also ==
- List of Alberta provincial electoral districts
- Canadian provincial electoral districts

Legislative Assembly of Alberta
| Preceded by Edmonton-Strathcona | Constituency represented by the premier of Alberta; 2019–2022 | Succeeded by Brooks-Medicine Hat |
