= Canadian nationality law =

Citizenship Act Loi sur la citoyenneté

Parliament of Canada
- Long title: An Act respecting citizenship
- Citation: RSC 1985, c. C-29
- Territorial extent: Canada
- Enacted by: 30th Canadian Parliament
- Commenced: 15 February 1977
- Administered by: Immigration, Refugees and Citizenship Canada

Repeals
- Canadian Citizenship Act, 1946
- Status: Amended

Canada's primary law governing nationality is the Citizenship Act, 1976, which commenced in 1977.

Individuals born anywhere within the provinces and territories of Canada are default citizens at birth, with few exceptions. Foreign nationals may naturalize after living in Canada for at least three years after holding permanent residency status and showing written and oral proficiency in the English or French language.

Canada is composed of several former British colonies whose residents were British subjects. When Canada was granted Dominion status within the British Empire in 1867, Canada was granted more autonomy over time and gradually became independent from the United Kingdom. Although Canadian citizens have not been British subjects since 1977, they continue to hold favoured status when residing in the UK. As Commonwealth citizens, Canadians are eligible to vote in UK elections and serve in public office there.

== History ==
=== Fragmented development ===
European settlement of North America began with the arrival of the first colonists from England and France in the 16th century. The rival empires competed to expand their territorial control until British victory in the Seven Years' War and annexation of French Canada in 1763. Despite the loss of the Thirteen Colonies in 1783, British presence on the continent continued to expand through the 19th century, often in contest with the United States as the two powers raced to settle the Pacific Northwest. British nationality law applied to the North American colonies, as was the case elsewhere in the British Empire. Residents of these colonies and all other imperial citizens were British subjects; any person born in British North America, the United Kingdom, or anywhere else within Crown dominions was a natural-born British subject.

British nationality law during this time was uncodified and did not have a standard set of regulations, relying instead on precedent and common law. Until the mid-19th century, it was unclear whether naturalization rules in the United Kingdom were applicable in other parts of the Empire. Each colony had wide discretion in developing their own procedures and requirements for admitting foreign settlers as subjects.

Naturalization in Britain was achieved through private Acts of Parliament until 1844, when a more streamlined administrative process was introduced. The North American colonies emulated this system in their own naturalization legislation, which was enacted in all local legislatures by 1868. In 1847, the Imperial Parliament formalised a clear distinction between subjects who naturalized in the UK and those who did so in other territories. Individuals who naturalized in the UK were deemed to have received the status by imperial naturalization, which was valid throughout the Empire. Those naturalizing in colonies were said to have gone through local naturalization and were given subject status valid only within the relevant territory; a subject who locally naturalized in British Columbia was a British subject there, but not in England or New Zealand. Nevertheless, locally naturalized British subjects were still entitled to imperial protection when travelling outside of the Empire.

Married women generally followed the nationality status of their husbands. Upper Canada enacted local legislation in 1849 that automatically naturalized foreign women who married British subjects, mirroring regulations enacted in the UK in 1844. After Britain established marital denaturalization for British subject women who married non-British men in 1870, Canada adapted its rules to match this in 1881. The 1870 regulations provided that any British subject who acquired a foreign nationality automatically lost subject status.

=== Post-confederation policies ===
On July 1, 1867, three British North American colonies (the Province of Canada, New Brunswick, and Nova Scotia) united to form the Dominion of Canada. The status of Canadians as British subjects remained unchanged despite the creation of this federation. Federal nationality legislation enacted in 1868 superseded laws of the new provinces; naturalization in one of the provinces became automatically valid in all of them. Foreigners were able to naturalize as British subjects in Canada after residing in the Dominion for at least three years, fulfilling a good character requirement, and swearing an oath of allegiance. By 1880, Britain had transferred all of its remaining North American territory to Canada except Newfoundland Colony, which became a separate Dominion in 1907.

The first law defining a "Canadian citizen" is the Immigration Act, 1910. A citizen under this definition did not hold a substantive Canadian citizenship and the term was only a label for those who had the right to enter and remain in Canada; Canadians continued to be British subjects. Under the Act, a Canadian "citizen" was any person born in Canada who had not denaturalized, a British subject domiciled in Canada for at least three years, or an individual naturalized in Canada who had not since lost British subject status and remained permanently resident in the Dominion.

==== Discriminatory policies against Asian migrants ====
Chinese immigration to Canada began in the 1850s during the British Columbia gold rushes. Growing hostility and anti-Chinese sentiment led to a concerted movement within the Legislative Assembly of British Columbia to restrict Chinese immigration. The provincial legislature attempted to discourage this migration with the Chinese Regulation Act of 1884, imposing an annual $10 fee on every Chinese person resident in the province and a $100 fine on recreational opium use. However, the law was struck down by the Supreme Court of British Columbia for legislating on issues beyond the scope of the provincial government. Laws directly restricting Chinese immigration were passed by the legislature in 1884 and 1885 but similarly struck down by orders in council. Fearing open violence if the situation were to continue, the federal government enacted the Chinese Immigration Act, 1885, which limited the number of Chinese migrants who could land in Canada to one per 50 tons of cargo and imposed a $50 head tax on every Chinese person who entered the Dominion. These measures also applied to British subjects of Chinese ancestry, but not those who were already resident in Canada. The entrance tax was increased to $100 in 1900 and to $500 in 1903.

When Japanese migrants started entering British Columbia in large numbers beginning in 1901, the local legislature attempted to legislate restrictions on this movement, but these measures were again struck down by the federal government in 1902, 1905, and 1907. Treaty obligations stemming from the Anglo-Japanese Alliance made total restriction impossible but the Dominion was able to limit Japanese migration to Canada in most cases with agreement from the Japanese government. Only individuals with government-approved work contracts, agricultural laborers for Japanese-owned farms, returning residents, and domestic workers for Japanese residents would be allowed entry.

Migration from India was also limited beginning in 1908, despite the fact that Indians were British subjects. Any person who landed in Canada from a country other than that of their birth or citizenship could be denied entry into the Dominion. Because there was no direct steamship service from India, this measure directly limited persons from India. Similar measures were created targeting British subjects from Hong Kong. All "Asiatic immigrants" were required beginning in 1908 to hold at least $200 of currency to enter Canada. The 1910 Immigration Act further enabled the federal government to limit the entrance of "immigrants belonging to any race deemed unsuited to the climate or requirements of Canada".

=== Imperial common code ===
The Imperial Parliament brought regulations for British subject status into codified statute law for the first time with passage of the British Nationality and Status of Aliens Act 1914. British subject status was standardised as a common nationality across the Empire. Dominions that adopted this Act as part of local legislation were authorised to grant subject status to aliens by imperial naturalization. A Dominion could define a citizenship for its own citizens, although that status would only be effective within the local Dominion's borders. Canada adopted the common code in 1914, and Newfoundland in 1916.

The 1914 regulations codified the doctrine of coverture into imperial nationality law, where a woman's consent to marry a foreign national was also assumed to be intent to denaturalise; British women who married foreign men automatically lost their British nationality. There were two exceptions to this: a wife married to a husband who lost his British subject status was able to retain British nationality by declaration, and a British-born widow or divorcée who had lost her British nationality through marriage could reacquire that status without meeting residence requirements after the dissolution of her marriage. Minor children whose parents voluntarily lost British subject status by renunciation or acquiring a foreign nationality were considered to have automatically British nationality as well, but could resume their status as British subjects by declaration within one year of reaching age 21.

Canada became an independent member of the League of Nations and the Permanent Court of International Justice in 1920. Each country was able to nominate a candidate to be a judge on this court. It would have been possible for a successful Canadian candidate, as a British subject, to be turned down from the court if a British subject from Australia or another part of the Empire was also selected as a judge. The Canadian Nationals Act, 1921 was enacted to allow Canada to differentiate its own nationals in international bodies. Under this law, a Canadian national was any British subject who qualified as a Canadian citizen under the Immigration Act, 1910.

By the end of the First World War, the Dominions had exercised increasing levels of autonomy in managing their own affairs and each by then had developed a distinct national identity. Britain formally recognised this at the 1926 Imperial Conference, jointly issuing the Balfour Declaration with all the Dominion heads of government, which stated that the United Kingdom and Dominions were autonomous and equal to each other within the British Commonwealth of Nations. Full legislative independence was granted to the Dominions with passage of the Statute of Westminster 1931.

Women's rights groups throughout the Empire pressured the imperial government during this time to amend nationality regulations that tied a married woman's status to that of her husband. Because the British government could no longer enforce legislative supremacy over the Dominions after 1931 and wanted to maintain a strong constitutional link to them through the common nationality code, it was unwilling to make major changes without unanimous agreement among the Dominions on this issue, which it did not have. Imperial legal uniformity was nevertheless eroded during the 1930s; New Zealand and Australia amended their laws in 1935 and 1936 to allow women denaturalized by marriage to retain their rights as British subjects, and Ireland changed its regulations in 1935 to cause no change to a woman's nationality after her marriage. Canada partially reformed its rules on marital denaturalization in 1932; women who had not acquired foreign nationality on marriage were permitted to retain their British nationality.

=== Canadian citizenship created ===
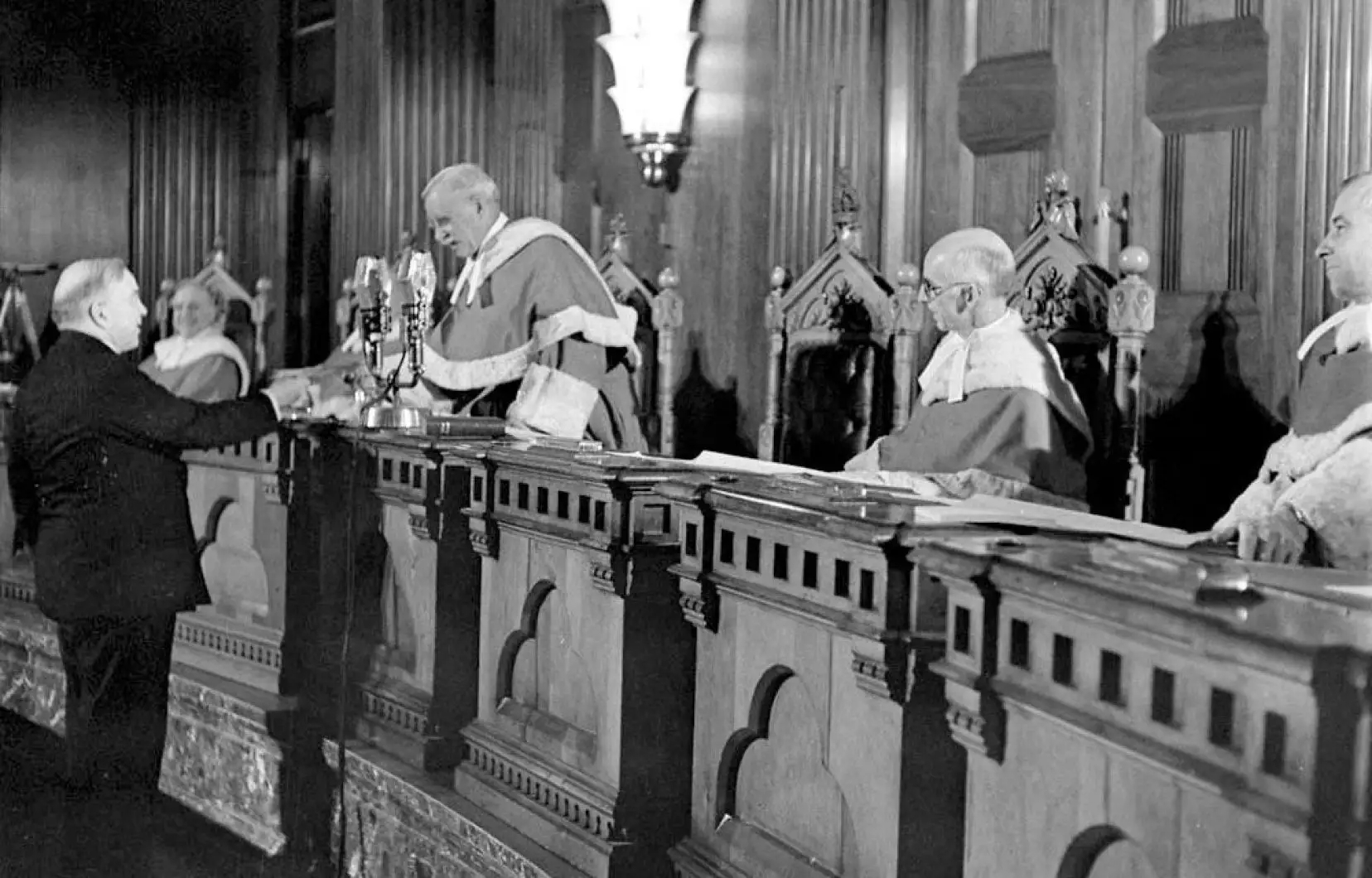
Prime Minister William Lyon Mackenzie King is presented with his citizenship certificate by Chief Justice Thibaudeau Rinfret after becoming the first Canadian citizen in 1947.

Following the Second World War, growing assertions of local national identity separate from that of Britain and the Empire led the Canadian government to develop a new substantive citizenship status based on a purely Canadian idea of nationhood. This was created with passage of the Canadian Citizenship Act, 1946, which came into force on January 1, 1947. All British subjects who were born, naturalized, or resident for at least five years in Canada automatically acquired Canadian citizenship on that date. British subjects born to a father who himself was born or naturalized in Canada also automatically acquired citizenship on that date. Women no longer automatically took the nationality of their husbands when they married, but any British subject woman who was already married to someone qualifying as a Canadian citizen when the 1946 Act came into force automatically acquired citizenship on that date. Minor children born overseas to a Canadian father or unmarried Canadian mother who had already been admitted into Canada also automatically became Canadian citizens. All citizens of Canada and any other Commonwealth country remained defined as British subjects under this Act. The Act later became applicable in Newfoundland when it joined Canada in 1949.

All other noncitizens could acquire citizenship by naturalization after fulfilling a general residence requirement and demonstrating proficiency in English or French. Candidates must have continuously resided in Canada for one year immediately preceding an application. Wives of Canadian citizens had no further residence requirement, but all other applicants were additionally required to have been resident in the country for at least four of the preceding six years, for a total requisite period of five years. Applicants who had been domiciled in Canada for at least 20 years were exempted from the language requirement. Successful completion of the naturalization process was dependent on the outcome of an interview with a citizenship judge to verify an applicant's background and fulfillment of the citizenship requirements. Non-local British subjects applying for naturalization were not subject to this judicial requirement.

==== Provisions for automatic loss of citizenship ====
Children born abroad to a Canadian father or unmarried Canadian mother after the 1946 Act came into force were eligible to became Canadian citizens, provided that their births were registered at a Canadian diplomatic mission within two years. On reaching age 21, these individuals were required to make a formal declaration of their intention to retain Canadian citizenship within one year. If they had acquired nationality of another country by birth or at any point as a minor, they were also required to renounce their other nationalities. Eligible minor children who had not already lawfully entered Canada when the Act became effective were subject to the same conditions for retaining Canadian citizenship on reaching age 21. The time limit to make a declaration of citizenship retention was later extended from one year to three years, before an applicable person's 24th birthday. Alternatively, they would also remain citizens if they were domiciled in Canada on reaching age 24.

Canadian citizens residing overseas who voluntarily acquired a foreign nationality other than through marriage automatically lost their Canadian citizenship. Canadians who became foreign nationals by marriage, who held another nationality by birth, or had otherwise become foreign nationals as minors could retain Canadian citizenship unless they made a formal declaration of renunciation. The 1946 Act further contained extensive measures for revoking citizenship from Canadians who were not natural-born. Individuals who became domiciled outside of Canada for six years, showed disloyalty to the monarch, obtained naturalization through fraudulent means, or traded with an enemy nation during a time of war were liable to have their citizenship revoked. Honorably discharged former service members of the Canadian Armed Forces were exempt from the six-year overseas residence limit. The maximum period of absence from Canada was extended to 10 years in the 1950s and later repealed in 1967.

=== Reform and abolition of British subject status ===
The creation of Canadian citizenship unilaterally broke the system of a common imperial nationality. Combined with the approaching independence of India and Pakistan in 1947, comprehensive reform to imperial nationality law was necessary at this point to address ideas that were incompatible with the previous system. The British Nationality Act 1948 abolished the common code and each Commonwealth country would enact legislation to create its own nationality. British subject was redefined to mean any citizen of a Commonwealth country. Commonwealth citizen is defined in this Act to have the same meaning. British subject/Commonwealth citizen status co-existed with the citizenships of each Commonwealth country. The change in naming indicated a shift in the base idea of British subject status; allegiance to the Crown was no longer a requirement to possess the common status, which would be maintained by voluntary agreement among the various members of the Commonwealth. Irish citizens were treated as if they were British subjects, despite Ireland's exit from the Commonwealth in 1949.

All British subjects under the reformed system initially held an automatic right to settle in the United Kingdom and Ireland. Non-white immigration into the UK was systemically discouraged, but strong economic conditions in Britain following the Second World War attracted an unprecedented wave of colonial migration. In response, the British Parliament imposed immigration controls on any subjects originating from outside the British Islands with the Commonwealth Immigrants Act 1962. Ireland had continued to allow all British subjects free movement despite independence in 1922 as part of the Common Travel Area arrangement, but moved to mirror Britain's restriction in 1962 by limiting this ability only to people born on the islands of Great Britain or Ireland. Britain somewhat relaxed these measures in 1971 for patrials, subjects whose parents or grandparents were born in the United Kingdom, which gave effective preferential treatment to white Commonwealth citizens.

As a sign of Canada's changing relationship with Britain, British subjects lost voting eligibility for federal elections in 1975. Provincial governments progressively phased out this entitlement until it was fully abolished in 2006. Preferences that were afforded to non-local British subjects in the naturalization process were abolished in 1977. British subject status itself was removed from Canadian law in that year as well, although Canadians and citizens from other Commonwealth countries remain defined as Commonwealth citizens.

By the 1970s and 1980s, most colonies of the British Empire had become independent and remaining ties to the United Kingdom had been significantly weakened. The UK itself updated its nationality law to reflect the more modest boundaries of its remaining territory and possessions with the British Nationality Act 1981, which redefined British subject to no longer also mean Commonwealth citizen. Canadian citizens remain Commonwealth citizens in British law and are still eligible to vote and stand for public office in the UK.

=== Expanding access to citizenship ===
The Citizenship Act 1977 expanded the available pathways to citizenship and allowed more situations to retain it. The retention requirement was abolished for individuals born overseas to natural-born or naturalized Canadians, and any applicable person who had not yet reached age 24 at that point was no longer required to make a declaration of retention; individuals born after February 1953 have not been subject to this requirement. Births overseas also no longer needed to be registered within two years to maintain eligibility for Canadian citizenship. However, persons born abroad to Canadian parents who themselves were born abroad became subject to a retention requirement before age 28. The general residence requirement for acquiring citizenship was reduced to three years and remaining gender imbalances were removed from nationality regulations; citizenship has been transferrable by descent to children through mothers as well as fathers regardless of marital status since 1977. Additionally, automatic denaturalisation of Canadians acquiring foreign nationalities was repealed.

As part of a 1988 agreement with the Japanese Canadian community in compensation for their internment during the Second World War, any individual of Japanese ancestry who was expelled from Canada or had their citizenship revoked between 1941 and 1949 was eligible for a special restoration of citizenship. This right to citizenship also extended to the descendants of applicable persons. The requirement for an interview with a citizenship judge in the naturalization process was largely replaced by the Canadian Citizenship Test in 1995. Applicants who failed this test are still required to be interviewed by a judge, although the rate of successfully passing the test is over 90 percent.

Naturalization requirements became more stringent in 2014, after passage of the Strengthening Canadian Citizenship Act. The general residence requirement was increased to a minimum of four of the preceding six years and applicants became required to be physically present in Canada for at least 183 days per year. The age range for candidates mandated to take citizenship and language tests was broadened to include all individuals aged 14 to 64 (previously 18 to 54) and the language requirement itself became stricter. While candidates were previously screened for language knowledge through their ability to pass the citizenship test, naturalization candidates became required to attain a level 4 rating in a Canadian Language Benchmark evaluation.

==== Restoration of involuntarily lost citizenship ====
When the 1977 Act was enacted, a provision was included that allowed children born abroad to unmarried Canadian mothers (but not fathers) who had not had their births registered within two years an extension to that deadline to register as Canadian citizens. In the 2004 Federal Court case Augier v Canada (Minister of Citizenship and Immigration), it was ruled that the exclusion of children born to unmarried Canadian fathers infringed upon rights of equality granted by the Canadian Charter of Rights and Freedoms. Individuals born abroad to unmarried Canadian fathers before 1977 could apply for citizenship during a limited application period that ended on August 14, 2004. Citizenship granted through this process was not retroactive from birth and was only applicable from the date it was granted.

Following the 2007 implementation of the Western Hemisphere Travel Initiative, Canadian citizens became required to hold Canadian passports when crossing the Canada–United States border. When applying for passports, a large number of individuals who believed themselves to be citizens discovered that they did not actually hold Canadian citizenship due to previous provisions concerning automatic loss under the 1946 Act. Legislation enacted in 2009 addressed this issue by restoring citizenship to specific categories of individuals who had involuntarily lost that status. This group of affected people became known as the Lost Canadians. Citizenship was restored to any person who: had naturalized as a Canadian citizen but resided overseas for more than 10 years before 1967, had acquired foreign nationality through their own or a parent's naturalization, had been born abroad to an applicable parent (married Canadian father or unmarried Canadian mother) before 1977 and did not have their birth registered with Canadian authorities or failed to apply for citizenship retention before age 24, or had been born abroad to a Canadian parent who themself was born abroad after 1977 but failed to apply for retention before age 28. Any person born abroad to a Canadian parent in the second or subsequent generations after the 1977 Act came into force but had not yet reached age 28 on 17 April 2009 was able to retain Canadian citizenship without application. However, citizenship has not been transferrable by descent past the first generation born abroad since that date.

Further changes became effective in 2015 that granted Canadian citizenship to certain groups of individuals who had never become citizens and their descendants. Canadian citizenship was granted to individuals who: were born or naturalized in Canada but lost British subject status before the 1946 Act came into force, were non-local British subjects ordinarily resident in Canada but did not qualify as Canadian citizens when that status was created, were born outside Canada in the first generation to a parent in either of the preceding categories, were born outside Canada in the first generation to a parent who did become a Canadian citizen when the 1946 Act became effective but who themself did not acquire citizenship, or were a foreign-born adoptee who was adopted before 1947 by a parent who became a Canadian citizen and who qualified to pass citizenship by descent. Any person who voluntarily renounced British subject status or had it revoked did not qualify to receive citizenship by this special grant.

In 2023, the Ontario Superior Court of Justice found the first-generation limit to citizenship by descent unconstitutional. The rule was deemed to have violated the charter rights of citizens born abroad, as it did not grant the same rights to citizens based on where they had been born. The Liberal government decided to not challenge the ruling, and is required by the court to grant citizenship to those impacted by the first-generation limit. The court required the government to pass a law doing so by June 20, 2024, but multiple extensions were granted, with the final deadline being January 20, 2026. The final version of the court-required law, Bill C-3 of the 45th Parliament, came into force on December 15, 2025.

== Acquisition and loss of citizenship ==
=== Entitlement by birth or adoption ===
With few exceptions, all individuals born in Canada receive Canadian citizenship by birth, including those who were born in Canadian airspace, internal and territorial waters, and Canadian-registered ships and aircraft. The only exceptions are children born to two foreign parents with at least one who is employed by a foreign government, an employee of a foreign government, or an organization with diplomatic immunity.

Abandoned children found before the age of seven are assumed to have been born in Canada, unless contrary evidence is found within seven years of discovery.

=== Entitlement by descent ===
In 2025, an amendment to the Citizenship Act, 1976, granted Canadian citizenship to children of Canadian parents beyond the first generation born abroad. Before the amendment, Canadian citizenship could not be granted to individuals born abroad to foreign-born Canadian citizens, creating an immigration phenomenon that the Canadian media labelled as the "Lost Canadians". Following the 2025 amendment, Canadian citizenship can be granted to those born outside Canada with the criteria depending on their date of birth or adoption:

==== People born or adopted abroad on or after December 15, 2025 ====
People born outside Canada in the second generation or later may be Canadian citizens if all of the following conditions are met:

- The parent was also born or adopted outside Canada to a Canadian citizen (grandparent was Canadian)
- That parent spent at least 1,095 days (3 years) physically present in Canada before the person’s birth.

Adopted individuals may be eligible to apply for Canadian citizenship if:

- They were born and adopted outside Canada in the second generation or later
- Canadian parent spent at least 1,095 days in Canada before the adoption.

==== People born or adopted abroad before December 15, 2025 ====
A person is automatically a Canadian citizen if they were:

- born before December 15, 2025
- born outside Canada to a Canadian parent.

This rule also applies to individuals whose parent became Canadian as a result of these legislative changes, for unlimited generations (i.e. if someone’s great-great-great-great-grandparent was born in Canada, they are probably a citizen).

=== Naturalization ===
Ordinary naturalisation in Canada is regulated at the federal level under the Citizenship Act, 1967, and administered by the Immigration, Refugees and Citizenship Canada (IRCC). Canadian citizenship is bestowed on conditions based on permanent residence status, physical presence, proficiency in the English or French Language, civic knowledge, and tax compliance. Over time, the requirements have been amended by Canadian Parliament to adjust residency thresholds, age ranges for testing, and the treatment of time spent in Canada before permanent residence. While the process applies uniformly across the country, the act provides specific exemptions and alternative pathways for minors, members of the Canadian Armed Forces, stateless individuals, and individuals granted citizenship under discretionary or exceptional circumstances by the IRCC.

Permanent residents aged 18 or older may apply for Canadian citizenship after residing in Canada for at least 1,095 days within the five-year period immediately before applying. Applicants may count each day within the preceding five-year period that they were present in Canada as a temporary resident or protected person as half a day of physical presence for this condition, up to a maximum of 365 days. Applicants also have to satisfy the listed criteria:

- Applicants must have filed income taxes for at least three of the preceding five years.
- Applicants aged 18 to 54 must demonstrate written and oral proficiency in English or French and pass the Canadian Citizenship Test.
- Applicants aged 14 and over must take the Oath of Citizenship.

In case by case circumstances, the IRCC can waive language requirements, the citizenship test, and the oath requirement for applicants with mental disabilities or compassionate circumstances.

Canadian citizenship can also be granted under the listed circumstances by discretion of the IRCC:

==== Canadian Armed Forces exceptions ====
- Permanent residents serving in the Canadian Armed Forces (CAF) may qualify with 1,095 days of completed military service within the previous six years.
- Foreign military members attached to the CAF with equivalent service are exempt from permanent residence and tax filing requirements.

==== Stateless individuals ====
Stateless individuals under 23 years old who were born abroad to at least one known Canadian parent after 17 April 2009, and have 1,095 days of physical presence within a four-year period, may be granted citizenship.

==== Parliament discretion ====
The Parliament of Canada is granted the ability to honorably naturalize foreign nationals after following a joint resolution by both the House of Commons and the Senate of Canada. The Parliament can also denaturalize those granted honorary citizenship.

=== Renunciation and revocation ===
Canadian citizenship can be relinquished by applying for renunciation, provided that the applicant already possesses or will possess another nationality. Individuals who automatically acquired citizenship in 2009 or 2015 because of amendments to nationality law in those years have a special route for renunciation that only requires that they are citizens of another country and costs no fees.

Former citizens who renounced their nationality may subsequently apply for nationality restoration, after reacquiring permanent residency and being physically present in Canada for at least 365 days during the two-year period preceding their applications. They must also have filed income taxes for the prior year. Individuals who had their citizenships revoked are ineligible for nationality resumption and must follow the naturalization process instead.

Citizenship may be revoked from individuals who fraudulently acquired it, and renunciations may be similarly rescinded from persons who provided false information during that process. The Federal Court holds decision-making power for all revocation cases, except where the individual in question specifically requests the IRCC Minister to make that decision. Additionally, between 28 May 2015 and 19 June 2017, Canadians holding another citizenship who were convicted of treason or terrorism were liable for potential citizenship revocation.

== Calls for reform of the Canadian Citizenship Act ==
Calls to rewrite the Canadian Citizenship Act have been echoed by various legal experts and organizations.

In 2009, the Senate Standing Committee on Social Affairs, Science and Technology described the Citizenship Act as a "cumbersome patchwork of technically drafted provisions, many of which refer to other provisions in now-repealed legislation." The committee further stated that the government should "prioritize replacing the Citizenship Act with new, clear, and straightforward citizenship legislation in the near future."

Amandeep Hayer, a lawyer representing the Canadian Bar Association (CBA), testified before the Senate Standing Committee on Social Affairs, Science and Technology in support of reforming the Citizenship Act. Hayer argued that the complexity of the Act — particularly s. 3 — made it inaccessible and difficult to understand. He further noted that references to previous iterations of the Act risked perpetuating outdated values, particularly regarding gender, and could result in another generation of Lost Canadians.

== Canadian royal family ==
Although the King of Canada primarily resides in the United Kingdom, the sovereign is the physical embodiment of the Canadian state, and is therefore considered Canadian. Members of the royal family are personal subjects of the Canadian monarch and not foreigners for the purpose of diplomatic or military protocol, but they fall within the definition of a foreign national unless they acquired Canadian citizenship or permanent residence and there is no legal provision that grants them automatic citizenship or permanent residence. The King and other royal family members have occasionally described Canada as "home" and themselves as Canadian.

Prince Edward, Duke of Kent and Strathearn, the father of Queen Victoria, lived in Lower Canada and Nova Scotia from 1791 to 1800, prior to her birth in 1819. As such Victoria and every monarch of Canada since has had a direct ancestor who lived in what is now Canada. With the passage of Bill C-3, this also most likely makes any British Royal decended from Queen Victoria a legal full Canadian citzen provided that they were born before December 15, 2025.
