= Jim Dinning =

Canadian politician (born 1952)

The Honourable Jim Dinning OC ECA

Member of the Legislative Assembly of Alberta for Calgary-Lougheed
- In office June 15, 1993 – March 11, 1997
- Preceded by: Riding Established
- Succeeded by: Marlene Graham

Member of the Legislative Assembly of Alberta for Calgary-Shaw
- In office May 8, 1986 – June 15, 1993
- Preceded by: Riding Established
- Succeeded by: Jon Havelock

Chancellor of the University of Calgary
- In office 2010–2014
- Preceded by: Joanne Cuthbertson
- Succeeded by: Robert Thirsk

Personal details
- Born: James Francis Dinning; December 4, 1952 (age 73) Edmonton, Alberta, Canada
- Party: Progressive Conservative

James Francis Dinning OC ECA (born December 4, 1952) is a Canadian Progressive Conservative politician and businessman. He was a Member of the Legislative Assembly of Alberta (1986–1997), and now is on the board of directors of several Canadian companies. Dinning ran for the leadership of the Alberta Progressive Conservatives to replace Ralph Klein as Premier of Alberta. Dinning raised over $2 million for his leadership bid but was ultimately defeated by Ed Stelmach when party members voted for Klein's replacement on December 2, 2006. In June 2010, he was selected as the 12th Chancellor of the University of Calgary. Dinning is an advisor to Canada's Ecofiscal Commission.

== Political history ==
After graduating at Western Canada High School in 1970, Dinning went on to obtain his Bachelor of Commerce honours degree from Queen's University in 1974. He also earned a Master's degree in Public Administration from Queen's in 1977.

Elected in the riding of Calgary-Shaw in 1986, Dinning held the riding until 1993. During this time he served in a variety of positions within the provincial government. He was the Minister of Community and Occupational Health from 1986 to 1988, the Minister of Education from 1988 to 1992, and he served as the Provincial Treasurer from 1992 to 1997.

In 2006, Dinning ran for leadership of the Progressive Conservative Association of Alberta party. Dinning ultimately lost the party election to Ed Stelmach as a result of a second ballot vote on December 2, 2006. During much of the campaign, he held at least a 20-point lead over his closest competitor and over a 40-point lead on Stelmach.

Today he is a corporate director, advisor and consultant to various companies, not-for-profits and governments.

=== Electoral record ===
==== 1986 ====
Calgary-Shaw

- Jim Dinning (PC) 6,694 61.5%
- Brendan Dunphy (Lib) 2,727 25.1%
- Len Curie (NDP) 1,166 10.7%
- Byron L. Chenger (Rep) 295 2.7%

==== 1989 ====
Calgary-Shaw

- Jim Dinning (PC) 7,412 52.9% (-8.6%)
- Bob Crump (Lib) 4,865 34.7% (+9.7%)
- Gordon M. Christie (NDP) 1,728 12.3% (+1.6%)

==== 1993 ====
Calgary-Lougheed (compared to Calgary-Shaw, which covered much of the same area in southwest Calgary)

- Jim Dinning (PC) 7,280 52.8% (-0.2%)
- Jack Driscoll (Lib) 5,803 42.1% (+7.3%)
- Catherine Rose (NDP) 502 3.6% (-8.7%)
- Peter Hope (CoR) 122 0.9% (-)
- Ida Bugmann (NLP) 88 0.6% (-)

== Career history ==
After retiring from active politics in 1997, he was a senior vice-president and then executive vice-president of TransAlta Corporation from August 1997 to December 2004.

Today, Dinning serves on the board of Russel Metals Inc. and Heritage Resource Royalty.

Previously he has served on the boards of Liquor Stores NA Ltd, Western Financial Group, and Western Investment Company of Canada Ltd where he was chair of those boards. He also was a director of Parkland Fuel Corp., Finning International, and Shaw Communications. He was chair of Export Development Canada and the Canada West Foundation, and served a four year term as chancellor of the University of Calgary.

Dinning was the chair of the Calgary Health Region from 1999 to 2001. He was a governor of the Banff Centre, and served as a director the Canadian Policy Research Networks (CPRN), and the Alberta Energy Research Institute.

The University of Calgary honoured Dinning in 2002 with an honorary doctorate. In 2011, he joined former Alberta Premier Ralph Klein when together they were honoured by the Canadian Taxpayers Federation with their TaxFighter Award. He was made a Fellow of the Institute for Corporate Directors in 2015.

He was named a Member of the Order of Canada in 2015.
