= Eric Bouchard =

Canadian politician from Alberta

Eric Bouchard MLA

MLA for Calgary-Lougheed
- Incumbent
- Assumed office May 29, 2023
- Preceded by: Jason Kenney

Personal details
- Party: UCP

Eric Bouchard is a Canadian politician from the United Conservative Party. He was elected as a Member of the Legislative Assembly of Alberta for Calgary-Lougheed in the 2023 Alberta general election.

== Electoral history ==
2023 Alberta general election: Calgary-Lougheed
Party	Candidate	Votes	%	±%
United Conservative	Eric Bouchard	9,690	56.45	-9.25
New Democratic	Venkat Ravulaparthi	6,924	40.33	+15.86
Liberal	John Roggeveen	369	2.15	+0.91
Solidarity Movement	Nathaniel Pawlowski	184	1.07	–
Total		17,167	99.18	–
Rejected and declined		142	0.82	
Turnout		17,309	60.06	
Eligible voters		28,818		
United Conservative hold		Swing		-12.55
Source(s) Source: Elections Alberta

=== 2023 UCP Calgary-Lougheed nomination contest ===
March 13, 2023

Candidate	Round 1		Round 2		Round 3	
Candidate	Votes	%	Votes	%	Votes	%
Eric Bouchard	275	35.1	319	41.5	382	51.3
Mark Fiselier	157	20.1	170	22.1	213	28.6
Sherissa Celis	137	17.5	142	18.5	149	20.0
Max DeGroat	115	14.7	138	17.9	Eliminated	
Michelle Mather	99	12.6	Eliminated			
Total	783	100.00	769	100.00	744	100.00
