= Dave Rodney =

Canadian politician

The Honourable Dave Rodney ECA

Member of the Legislative Assembly of Alberta for Calgary-Lougheed
- In office November 22, 2004 – November 1, 2017
- Preceded by: Marlene Graham
- Succeeded by: Jason Kenney

Personal details
- Born: June 27, 1964 (age 62) Mankota, Saskatchewan, Canada
- Party: United Conservative
- Other political affiliations: Progressive Conservative Association of Alberta (2004-2017)
- Spouse: Jennifer Rodney (née Adams)
- Children: 2
- Education: University of Saskatchewan; Newman Theological College
- Occupation: educator, film maker, and motivational speaker

David Anthony Rodney ECA (born June 27, 1964) is a Canadian politician and was a Member of the Legislative Assembly of Alberta representing the constituency of Calgary-Lougheed, first as a Progressive Conservative and then the United Conservative Party when it was formed in July 2017 by the merger of the PC Party merged with the Wildrose Party. He was first elected in the 2004 provincial election and re-elected three times. He resigned on November 1, 2017, in order to open a seat for new United Conservative Party leader Jason Kenney. He was the first Canadian to ascend to the summit of Mount Everest twice.

== Early life ==
Rodney was born June 27, 1964, in Mankota, Saskatchewan. He graduated with a Bachelor of Arts degree (with distinction) in 1987 and Bachelor of Education after-degree in 1988 from the University of Saskatchewan. He obtained his Master of Religious Education (with distinction) from Newman Theological College in Edmonton in 2002.

Prior to being elected into the Legislative Assembly of Alberta, Rodney worked in a variety of capacities. He was an educator and administrator for 13 years in Canada, Nepal and the West Indies, and worked for three terms as an Employment and Immigration Canada placement officer. In 1997 he founded SpiritQuest Enterprises Inc., of which he was both president and CEO. He became an international keynote speaker, workshop facilitator, and worldwide adventure guide and worked with National Geographic, BBC, and Oprah Winfrey, among others, to produce more than 20 books and documentaries. He cofounded the Top of the World Society for Children with his wife, Jennifer.

== Political life ==
Rodney first sought public office in the 2004 provincial election in the constituency of Calgary-Lougheed. In that election, he received 60% of the vote. During his first term in office, in addition to his responsibilities as an MLA, Rodney held the title of chair for each of Calgary caucus, the Standing Committee on Legislative Offices, and the Alberta Alcohol and Drug Abuse Commission (AADAC). He was also the government liaison for the Strategic Tourism Marketing Council, and served as a member on numerous committees.

While Dave Rodney was Chairman of the Alberta Alcohol and Drug Abuse Commission (AADAC), specifically between January 2004 and September 2006, executive director Lloyd Carr (in charge of the commission's tobacco reduction unit) defrauded his agency of $624,500 through phony teen smoking reduction program grants of funds that Carr himself was the ultimate recipient of, according to the Alberta Auditor General's investigation and report . The Auditor General was severely critical of AADAC management's hiring and contracting practices, the absence of control mechanisms, as well as the Board's failure to provide oversight and general lack of substantive involvement in governance.. Carr was convicted of fraud and sentenced to 42 months imprisonment in 2010 .

Rodney sponsored a number of bills during the 26th Legislature; he sponsored one private member's bill, Smoke-free Places Act, 2005 and one private bill, Burns Memorial Trust Amendment Act, 2006, in addition to four government bills: Hotel Room Tax (Tourism Levy) Amendment Act, 2005, Health Statutes Amendment Act, 2007, Access to the Future Amendment Act, 2007, and Insurance Amendment Act, 2007.

On March 3, 2008, Rodney was re-elected to a second term as MLA for Calgary-Lougheed with 53% of the vote. In the 27th Legislature, he sponsored a private member's bill, the Alberta Income Tax (Physical Activity Credit) Amendment Act, 2008. He is the chair of the all-party Policy Field Committee on Community Services, government liaison to the Strategic Tourism Marketing Commission, and member of each of the Agenda and Priorities Committee, Special Standing Committee on Members Services, and Cabinet Policy Committee on Community Services.

After the election of Jason Kenney as leader of the United Conservative Party, Rodney announced that he was resigning as MLA for Calgary-Lougheed, effective November 1, 2017, in order to allow Kenney an opportunity to enter the legislature by contesting the seat in a by-election. Rodney did not seek a new seat in the 2019 provincial election.

== Personal life ==
Rodney is married to Jennifer. The couple have two children and a puppy named MacGyver. Rodney has long been an active volunteer; prior to entering politics, he worked for more than 60 charities, both locally and globally. He has received many accolades for his philanthropic work and personal accomplishments, including the Queen's Golden Jubilee Medal for community service, a spot on Alberta Venture magazine's list of Alberta's 50 Most Influential People, and the dedication of a park "Rodney Ridge" in his hometown, (Yorkton, Saskatchewan) where he holds a spot on the sports hall of fame.

Tragedy marred Rodney's 1999 ascent of Everest. Michael Matthews, a member of Rodney's expedition and the youngest Briton to climb Everest, died during his descent. Rodney was interviewed about this experience and featured on the 2023 Disney+ feature documentary, "Finding Michael".

== Election results ==
=== 2004 general election ===
2004 Alberta general election results		Turnout 40.67%		Swing	
Affiliation	Candidate	Votes	%	Party	Personal
Progressive Conservative	Dave Rodney	6,336	59.84%	-14.35%	
Liberal	Al Pollock	2,972	28.07%	7.04%	
Green	Ryan Boucher	471	4.45%	*	
Alberta Alliance	Tariq Khan	445	4.20%		
New Democratic	Matt Koczkur	365	3.44%	-1.34%	
Total		10,589	100%		
Rejected, Spoiled and Declined		70			
26,209 Eligible Electors
Progressive Conservative hold		Swing		-10.70%	

=== 2008 general election ===
2008 Alberta general election results		Turnout 39.16%		Swing	
Affiliation	Candidate	Votes	%	Party	Personal
Progressive Conservative	Dave Rodney	7,190	52.51%	-7.33%	
Liberal	Lori Czerwinski	3,926	28.68%	0.61%	
Wildrose Alliance	Derrick Jacobson	1,620	11.83%	7.63%	
Green	Bernie Amell	520	3.80%	-0.65%	*
New Democratic	Clint Marko	336	2.45%	-0.99%	
Independent	Keith Laurie	100	0.73%		
Total		13,692	100%		
Rejected, Spoiled and Declined		42			
35,071 Eligible Electors
Progressive Conservative hold		Swing		-3.97%	

=== 2012 general election ===
2012 Alberta general election
Party	Candidate	Votes	%	±%
Progressive Conservative	Dave Rodney	7,849	50.26%	
Wildrose	John Carpay	5,995	38.39%	
Liberal	Fred Stenson	1,160	7.43%	
New Democratic	Brent Kelly	612	3.92%	

=== 2015 general election ===
2015 Alberta general election: Calgary-Lougheed
Party	Candidate	Votes	%	±%
Progressive Conservative	Dave Rodney	5,939	34.99	-15.22
New Democratic	Mihai Ion	5,437	32.03	+28.07
Wildrose	Mark Mantei	4,781	28.17	-10.24
Liberal	Leila Keith	817	4.81	-2.61
Total valid votes		16,974	98.54	
Rejected, spoiled and declined		251	1.46	+0.28
Eligible electors/ turnout		33,547	51.35	-0.52
Progressive Conservative hold		Swing		-21.65
Source(s) "2015 Provincial General Election Results". Elections Alberta.

== See also ==
- List of Mount Everest summiters by number of times to the summit
