= Lost Canadians =

Group affected by Canadian nationality law

Lost Canadians (French: Canadiens dépossédés de leur citoyenneté) are individuals who have believed themselves to be Canadian citizens or to be entitled to citizenship, but who are not/were not officially considered citizens due to particular and often obscure aspects or interpretations of Canadian nationality law before 2025.

Although these individuals had strong, undeniable connections to Canada, they were either never actually Canadian citizens throughout their entire life, or else had Canadian citizenship and lost it unknowingly through certain provisions of the Citizenship Act.

In 2025, the Parliament of Canada amended the Citizenship Act to allow individuals of Canadian descent to apply for Canadian citizenship if certain criteria are met (including birth prior to December 15, 2025) and establish clear criteria for transmitting Canadian citizenship by descent for all future births abroad.

== Causes of loss/failure to acquire Canadian citizenship ==
Types of persons who would not have acquired Canadian citizenship when it was created under the 1946 citizenship laws included the following:

- Someone born in another country who did not live in Canada on their 24th birthday
- A "war bride" who was never naturalized
- A war bride's child who was never naturalized
- An unregistered "border baby" – a person with Canadian parents who was born in the U.S. and not registered, commonly someone whose mother crossed into the U.S. to give birth in the closest hospital
- In certain circumstances, someone whose connection to Canada involved descent through a woman rather than a man
- Someone born out of wedlock
- A person born to a parent on military service outside Canada

Types of persons who lost their Canadian citizenship included the following (based on both the 1946 and 1977 Citizenship Acts):

- A second-generation born-abroad Canadian who did not apply to retain citizenship by their 28th birthday
- Those whose father naturalized in another country while they were children
- A woman who married a non-Canadian before 1947
- A child of a woman who married a non-Canadian before 1947, regardless of whether that child was born or lived in Canada
- A Canadian who took citizenship of another country before 1977

In most cases, Lost Canadians were never aware that they were not citizens (or had lost their citizenship) until they applied for government pensions, attempted to receive healthcare or applied for passports.

The Canadian Bar Association (CBA) has argued that the root issue in the current Canadian Citizenship Act lies in the continued reliance on outdated legal principles carried over from earlier statutes. In his testimony before the Senate, Amandeep Hayer, the lawyer representing the CBA, highlighted that references to old laws, such as the Naturalization Act of 1914, Canadian Citizenship Act of 1947, and the Citizenship Act of 1952, inadvertently incorporate outdated values that contribute to exclusions like those experienced by Lost Canadians. Hayer emphasized that in many cases, it was these references to previous laws and their associated values that resulted in the denial of citizenship to individuals who otherwise would have been entitled to it under modern standards. The CBA has pointed out that as long as outdated legal principles persist in the legislation, the exclusion of certain individuals will continue to be a problem. Additionally, during testimony before the House of Commons, witnesses echoed similar concerns, noting that the continued use of old statutory references reinforces the exclusions experienced by Lost Canadians and prevents necessary legal modernization.

== Citizenship Act Amendments ==
=== 2008 ===
On May 29, 2007, Canadian Minister of Citizenship and Immigration Diane Finley (CPC) announced her proposal to amend the Citizenship Act. Under the proposal, anyone naturalized in Canada since 1947 would have citizenship even if they lost it under the 1947 Act. Also, anyone born since 1947 outside the country to a Canadian mother or father, in or out of wedlock, would have citizenship if they are the first generation born abroad. Appearing before the Standing Committee on Citizenship and Immigration, Finley asserted that as of May 24, 2007, there were only 285 cases of individuals in Canada whose citizenship status needed to be resolved. Under the proposed legislation, anyone born before 1947 to a Canadian citizen abroad would be dealt with on a case-by-case basis; such individuals would have to apply for a ministerial permit.

Bill C-37, which received Royal Assent on April 17, 2008, amended the Citizenship Act to give Canadian citizenship to those who lost or never had it due to certain provisions in existing and former legislation. The law came into effect on April 17, 2009, one year following Royal Assent.

People who were citizens when the law came into force did not lose citizenship as a result of these amendments. The law was made retroactive to the time of birth or loss of citizenship, and gave citizenship to the following categories of people:

- People who became citizens when the first citizenship act took effect on January 1, 1947 (including people born in Canada prior to 1947 and war brides) and who then lost their citizenship;
- Anyone who was born in Canada or had become a Canadian citizen on or after January 1, 1947, and had then lost citizenship; and
- Anyone born abroad to a Canadian citizen mother on or after January 1, 1947, if not already a citizen, but only if they were the first generation born abroad.

The exceptions are those born in Canada to a foreign diplomat, those who renounced their citizenship with Canadian authorities, and those whose citizenship was revoked by the government because it was obtained by fraud.

=== 2015 ===
In 2015, the Citizenship act was amended to grant citizenship to those born in Canada who lost their British Subject status prior to 1947 (or 1949), as well as their children. This includes:

- People born or naturalized in Canada before January 1, 1947 (or April 1, 1949 in Newfoundland and Labrador), but stopped being a British subject and didn’t become a citizen on that date
- British subjects living in Canada but weren’t eligible for Canadian citizenship on January 1, 1947 (or April 1, 1949 in Newfoundland and Labrador)
- born outside Canada in the first generation before January 1, 1947 (or April 1, 1949 in Newfoundland and Labrador), to a parent described above
- born outside Canada in the first generation before January 1, 1947 (or April 1, 1949 in Newfoundland and Labrador), to a parent who became a citizen on that date and you didn’t become a citizen on that date
- foreign-born and adopted before January 1, 1947 (or April 1, 1949 in Newfoundland and Labrador), and at least one adoptive parent became a Canadian citizen on that date and the adoptive parent is eligible to pass on citizenship by descent

==== New Lost Canadians ====
The amendment, which attempted to address the original phenomenon, included a provision that Canadian citizens by birth who were born outside Canada could not pass citizenship to their children born outside the country. This in turn has led to the potential creation of a new group of "Lost Canadians", with one notable example being Rachel Chandler, born in China to a Libya-born son of Canadian parents and a Chinese woman. Because her parents' marriage was not recognized by China at the time of her birth, she was not granted citizenship by China, and because she was born after Bill C-37 took effect, her father could not pass on his Canadian citizenship to her. This apparently rendered her stateless (which is against the Convention on the Rights of the Child, of which Canada is a signatory). Chandler now holds an Irish passport. She was entitled to Irish citizenship through her Irish-born paternal grandfather.

John Nicolas Fortin-Rodriguez of Magog, Quebec, born in Mexico in 2011 to Patrick Fortin (himself born abroad, the son of a Canadian soldier posted to CFB Lahr in Cold War-era West Germany) and Lucero Rodriguez (an immigrant from Mexico to Canada), holds a Mexican passport with a Canadian visa but has been denied Canadian citizenship due to being second generation born abroad.

In addition, some people born abroad in the second and subsequent generations not entitled to citizenship under previous versions of the Citizenship Act remain excluded due to the wording of changes which were part of Bill C-24 (2014). This limitation does not apply to people born before 2009 in similar circumstances, whose ancestor was not regularized by C-24.

=== 2025 ===
==== Bjorkquist ruling ====
In 2023, the Ontario Superior Court of Justice gave its ruling in Bjorkquist et al. v. Attorney General of Canada, finding the first-generation limit on citizenship by descent unconstitutional, with the court requirement the government to amend the Citizenship Act. This will have the effect of granting citizenship to additional Lost Canadians who did not acquire citizenship through the prior amendments.

==== Bill C-3 ====
Bill C-3 came into force on December 15, 2025. The legislation amended the Canadian Citizenship Act to remove the first-generation limit on citizenship by descent and to restore Canadian citizenship to certain individuals who had previously lost or been denied citizenship under earlier laws. It also extended eligibility to some descendants of individuals who acquired citizenship under legislative amendments enacted in 2009 and 2015. The law effectively rectified the situation pertaining to Lost Canadians. According to Immigration, Refugees and Citizenship Canada, 1,480 people had been confirmed as "citizens by descent under the new Act" by January 2026. In June 2026, an unknown number of Americans recently granted Canadian citizenship received letters asking them to surrender their citizenship certificates, citing that they "may not be entitled" to them.

==== Age 28 expiry rule remedied ====
The legislative change aimed to correct an historic inequity that stripped thousands of Canadians of their status without notice, and to ensure that citizenship is retained when the parent was Canadian at the time of birth.

== Cases not resolved by the modified law ==
As of 2009, there are still some people who are sometimes referred to as Lost Canadians, including some children of war brides, children born out of wedlock during the Second World War, and Mennonites who have been refused citizenship by the Canadian government. As of 21 October 2009, there were currently 81 people who are asserted to be such cases, but this number is shrinking as the remaining people in this category die off. One person who died while waiting for citizenship (in February 2009) was Guy Valliere, a World War II veteran who had been publicly promised citizenship by Diane Finley.

=== Kasey Neal ===
Kasey Neal, aged two and a half as of 2010, was denied citizenship because her grandparent was a female Canadian rather than a male Canadian. Citizenship and Immigration Canada (CIC) claimed that she is not eligible because her parent was at first denied citizenship and then was later granted retroactive citizenship (which would seem to make her the daughter of a Canadian and thus ordinarily guarantee citizenship). The Supreme Court of Canada ruled in Benner v. Canada (1997) that children of female Canadians are legally guaranteed all rights and privileges that children of male Canadians receive; however, this court decision was not interpreted by the CIC in favour of her case for citizenship. This denial of citizenship is being brought before judicial review and could lead to a class-action lawsuit if the Supreme Court's decision is ignored by CIC.

=== Priscilla Corrie ===
In September 2010, Priscilla Corrie (87), a "war bride", was denied a Canadian passport despite having received passports in the past and despite being on Old Age Pension and Canadian Pension Plan and having come to Canada when she was 20. Her passport was issued later that year, after the government was forced to act due to media coverage of the incident in the Vancouver Sun newspaper.

=== Sandra Burke ===
Sandra Burke came to Canada at six years of age with her Canadian father after her American mother died. He then abandoned her, and she was raised by her paternal grandmother in Toronto and P.E.I. She has been unable to produce copies of her entry documents to Canada, and as of September 2010, the Citizenship and Immigration office of Canada has refused to search their archives.

In 2010, Burke was 66 and was facing possible removal as well as losing old age benefits.

On December 21, 2010, in Mississauga, Ontario, Burke was finally able to take her oath of statehood, after a lengthy fight and support from her MP.

=== Jackie Scott ===
The daughter of a Canadian soldier and a British-born mother naturalized as a Canadian citizen in 1955, Jackie Scott was refused a citizenship card in 2005. She was born while her father was stationed in England during the war in 1945; her parents were unmarried at the time. In 2013, Jackie Scott took her case to the courts to seek judicial review of her exclusion.

=== Byrdie Funk ===
Funk was born in Mexico to Canadian parents and moved back to Canada with them when she was two months old. Since then, Canada has been her home and she holds no other citizenship. She and her parents were unaware of a law requiring people born overseas between 1977 and 1981 to parents also born abroad to apply to maintain their citizenship by the age of 28, and missed the deadline. The arcane rule was abolished in 2009, however the change was not retroactive. Funk joined the "Lost Canadians" group as she worked through the bureaucracy to regain her citizenship, which she regained on July 1, 2017.

=== Notable "Lost Canadians" ===
One notable Lost Canadian was Robert Goulet. He had provided evidence to support a claim of citizenship, but he died before it was approved.
