= Peter Lougheed =

Premier of Alberta from 1971 to 1985

The Honourable Peter Lougheed PC CC AOE QC
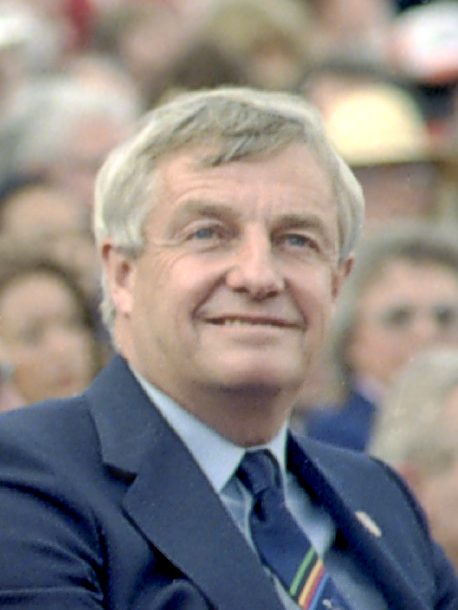
- Lougheed in 1983

10th Premier of Alberta
- In office September 10, 1971 – November 1, 1985
- Monarch: Elizabeth II
- Lieutenant Governor: Grant MacEwan; Ralph Steinhauer; Frank C. Lynch-Staunton; Helen Hunley
- Preceded by: Harry E. Strom
- Succeeded by: Don Getty

Leader of the Official Opposition in Alberta
- In office February 15, 1968 – April 27, 1971
- Preceded by: Michael Maccagno
- Succeeded by: Harry Strom

Leader of the Progressive Conservative Association of Alberta
- In office March 20, 1965 – October 13, 1985
- Preceded by: Milt Harradence
- Succeeded by: Don Getty

Member of the Legislative Assembly of Alberta for Calgary West
- In office May 23, 1967 – February 28, 1986
- Preceded by: Donald S. Fleming
- Succeeded by: Elaine McCoy

Personal details
- Born: Edgar Peter Lougheed; July 26, 1928 Calgary, Alberta, Canada
- Died: September 13, 2012 (aged 84) Calgary, Alberta, Canada
- Party: Progressive Conservative
- Spouse: Jeanne Rogers (m. 1952)
- Children: 4
- Education: University of Alberta (BA, LLB); Harvard University (MBA)
- Profession: Lawyer

Edgar Peter Lougheed PC CC AOE QC (/ˈlɔːhiːd/ LAW-heed; July 26, 1928 – September 13, 2012) was a Canadian lawyer and Progressive Conservative politician who served as the tenth premier of Alberta from 1971 to 1985, presiding over a period of reform and economic growth.

Born in Calgary, Alberta, Peter was the son of Edgar Donald Lougheed and Edna Alexandria Bauld and grandson of Canadian Senator Sir James Alexander Lougheed, a prominent Alberta businessman. Peter Lougheed attended the University of Alberta where he attained his Bachelor of Laws while playing football at the University of Alberta before joining the Edmonton Eskimos of the Western Interprovincial Football Union for two seasons in 1949 and 1950. After graduating, he entered business and practised law in Calgary.

In 1965, he was elected leader of the Alberta Progressive Conservative Party, which held no seats in the legislature. He led the party back into the legislature in the 1967 provincial election as the leader of the Official Opposition, then elected as Premier with 49 of 75 seats in the 1971 election, defeating the Social Credit Party and ending the dynasty which had governed Alberta since 1935. Lougheed established a progressive conservative dynasty in the province that lasted until 2015, when the New Democratic Party won a majority government; at 43 years and 7 months it was the longest unbroken run in government for a political party in Canadian history. Lougheed led the Tories again to victory in 1975, 1979 and 1982, winning landslide majorities each time, with vote tallies of 57 to 63 percent of votes cast.

As premier, Lougheed furthered the development of the oil and gas resources, and started the Alberta Heritage Fund to ensure that the exploitation of non-renewable resources would be of long-term benefit to Alberta. He introduced the Alberta Bill of Rights. He quarrelled with Pierre Trudeau's federal Liberal government over its 1980 introduction of the National Energy Program. After hard bargaining, Lougheed and Trudeau eventually reached an agreement for energy revenue sharing in 1981. Calgary's bid to host the 1988 Winter Olympics was developed during Lougheed's terms. Alberta also experienced economic success and went through significant social reform under the Lougheed administration.

From 1996 to 2002, Lougheed served as Chancellor of Queen's University. He sat on the boards of a variety of organizations and corporations. In a 2012 edition of Policy Options, the Institute for Research on Public Policy named Lougheed the best Canadian premier of the last forty years.

== Early life ==
Edgar Peter Lougheed was born on July 26, 1928, in Calgary, Alberta, as the second biological son to Edgar Donald Lougheed (1893–1951) a lawyer from Calgary, and Edna Alexandria Lougheed (née Bauld) (1901–1972) of Halifax. Lougheed's paternal grandfather was Sir James Alexander Lougheed (1854–1925) a Senator, federal cabinet minister in the Robert Borden and Arthur Meighen governments, and pioneer lawyer in Calgary.

Lougheed's paternal grandmother, Belle Hardisty, was Metis by both her paternal and maternal lines. She was niece of Richard Hardisty (1831–1889), Canada's first Métis Senator. He served in that chamber from 1888 to his death in 1889, when the seat was filled by Belle's husband, James Lougheed.

James Lougheed, Peter's grandfather, accumulated significant wealth in real estate and oil firms before his death in 1925. Much of James Lougheed's oil securities were sold following his death to pay the estate tax. Although James Lougheed's home Beaulieu went into tax recovery proceedings after his death, the City of Calgary permitted James' widow to continue to reside in the home until her death. The onset of the Great Depression resulted in lower demand for the family's office real estate leading to financial difficulties for Edgar Lougheed and his family who continued to manage several properties. Many of Peter Lougheed's early years were spent moving between rented homes and apartments in Calgary. The Lougheed family fortune recovered in the 1940s with growing demand for accommodation in the family's real estate holdings.

Lougheed attended several schools in Calgary, including Strathcona School for Boys, Earl Grey School, Rideau Park School, and the Central Collegiate Institute. At the Central Collegiate Institute, Lougheed founded the students' union and became its first president.

After graduating from the Central Collegiate Institute in 1947, Lougheed enrolled at the University of Alberta where he earned a Bachelor of Arts in 1951 and a Bachelor of Laws in 1952. Lougheed was elected as the president of the Students' Union in 1951, defeating Ivan Head and two other candidates. In an interview for Wood's biography of Lougheed, Head complemented Lougheed's university campaign, recognizing Lougheed's first-rate organizational abilities. Lougheed also served as the editor for the sports section for The Gateway, the University of Alberta student newspaper. While studying at the University of Alberta he joined the Delta Upsilon fraternity, served as president and in Rutherford House for four years.

=== Football career ===
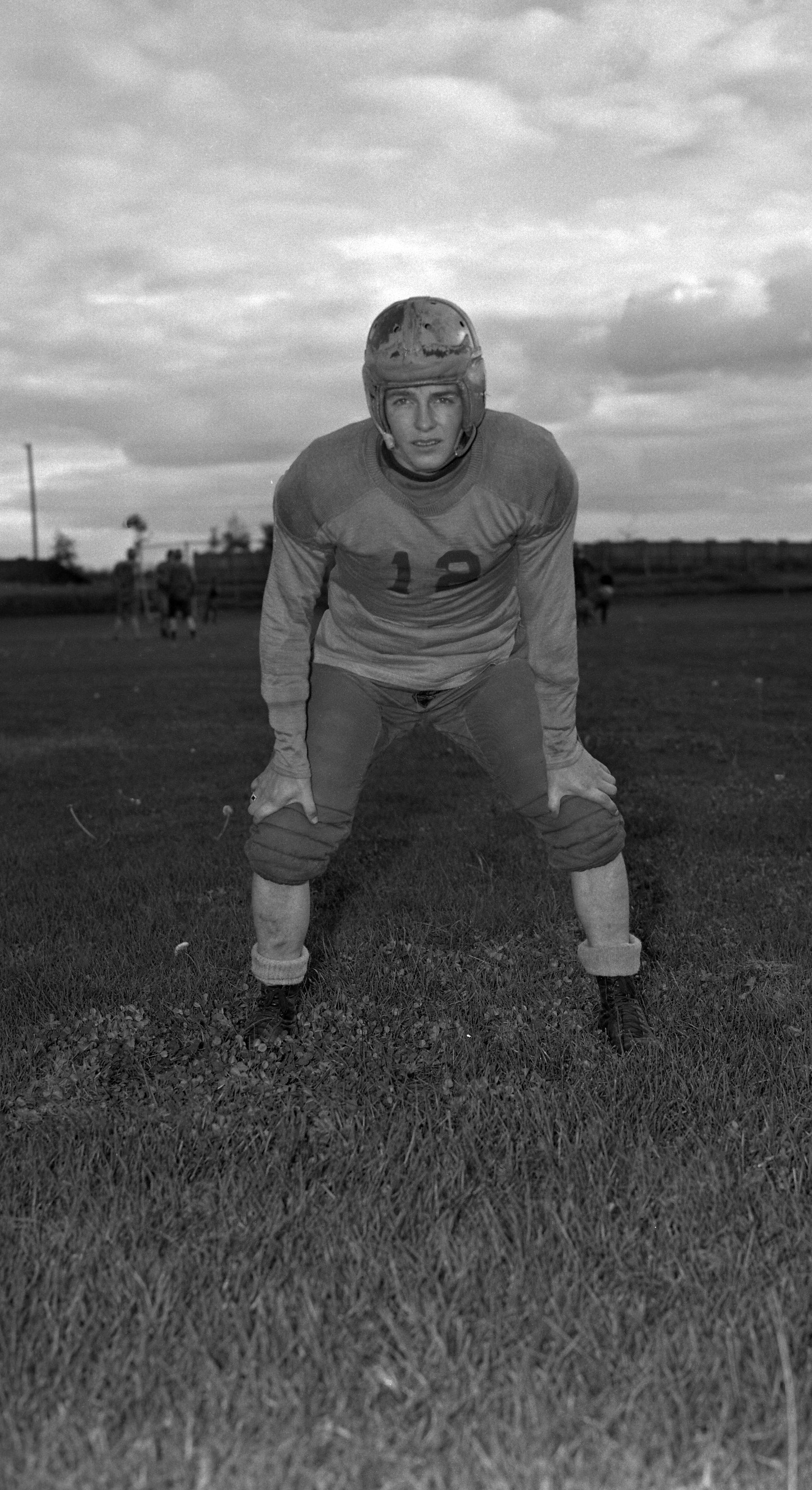
Peter Lougheed as a member of the Alberta Golden Bears football team in 1947.

Despite his small stature, Lougheed took a strong interest in football in his youth. Prior to attending the University of Alberta, Lougheed played for the junior Calgary Tornadoes as a halfback. A sports writer of the Calgary Herald described Lougheed as a "speedy and elusive back", and the Edmonton Journal described him as "gifted with the fine turn of speed" and "an elusive handful".

During his time as a student, Lougheed was also involved in football. He played for the University of Alberta Golden Bears and later for the Edmonton Eskimos of the Western Interprovincial Football Union for two years, in 1949 and 1950. Lougheed's position with the Eskimos was as a punt return specialist.

=== Post-football ===
On June 21, 1952, Lougheed married Jeanne "Jeannie" Estelle Rogers (1928–2020), whom he met while attending the University of Alberta. Jeanne was born in Forestburg, Alberta to Lawrence Rogers, a physician and Estelle Christena Gunston.

After finishing law school, Lougheed started working at the law firm of Fenerty, McGillivray and Robertson in Calgary. However, he had his sights set on Harvard University to pursue a Master of Business Administration, which he completed in 1954. While still a student at Harvard, Lougheed had a number of jobs including a brief time at Chase Manhattan Bank in New York City, and a summer with Gulf Oil in Tulsa, Oklahoma. It was during this time in Tulsa that Lougheed saw firsthand the aftermath of an oil boom town after the resource had been depleted. According to political scientist and biographer Allan Tupper suggested Lougheed drew parallels between Tulsa and a possible future for Alberta.

After completing his Master of Business Administration at Harvard, Lougheed faced a career crossroads. Lougheed was a staunch believer that people should avoid excessive specialization in favour of maximizing their diversity of experience, and he anticipated spending time in business, law, and politics. In pursuit of business, Lougheed accepted a position as a legal assistant with the Canadian construction firm, Mannix Corporation in June 1956, where he was eventually promoted to a corporate law and management position. Later in 1962, Lougheed left Mannix to establish an independent law practice, partnering with John Ballem who brought oil and gas experience and later adding Marvin McDill. Lougheed also served on several boards including the Calgary Stampeders football club, and the Calgary Stampede and Exhibition board in 1963. However, in the early 1960s, Lougheed began to turn his attention toward politics.

== Early political career ==
Lougheed's family history through his grandfather was rooted in the Conservative Party, and that motivated him to pursue a political career. However, during that time, Alberta was represented almost entirely by Progressive Conservatives in the House of Commons of Canada. Although this made federal politics an option, Lougheed saw it as a drawback; he considered the field of federal Progressive Conservatives politicians from Alberta to be crowded, and the life of a backbencher held little appeal for him.

Instead, he turned his attention to the provincial Progressive Conservatives. The party had not formed government since Alberta's founding in 1905, and under leader Milt Harradence had captured a mere 13 per cent of the vote and no seats in the previous 1963 election. The party lacked a network of constituency associations capable of organizing a cohesive campaign. Lougheed sought to differentiate the provincial party from the federal Progressive Conservatives and felt voters should be well aware that he was the dominant figure for the party, and not the leader of the federal party.

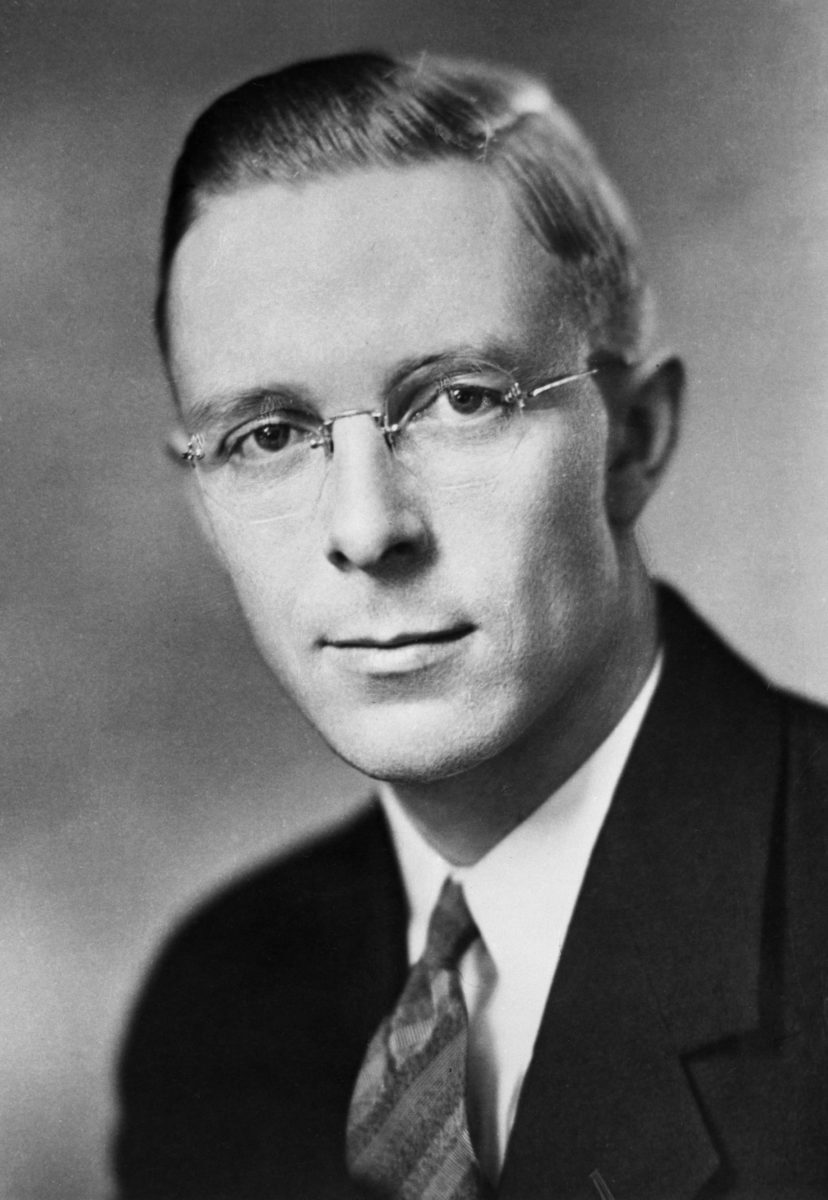
In 1943 Ernest Manning became Alberta's premier, a position he held until 1968.

At the time, the Social Credit Party of Alberta had won every election since 1935. The party was led by Premier Ernest Manning, who had held that role for several decades since he assumed the position in 1943. Manning was popular, and his party had received 55 per cent of the vote in the 1963 election to capture 60 of 63 seats in the legislature. Albertans however, were reluctant to support Social Credit at the federal level, instead electing Progressive Conservative candidates consistently. The provincial Social Credit constituency associations often shared the same members with the federal Progressive Conservatives.

Lougheed believed that the time was right for a change in Alberta's political landscape. He thought that Social Credit was too rural and lacked assertiveness in intergovernmental relations. According to Lougheed, Alberta needed to be a senior partner in Confederation, but the Social Credit Party was not in touch with the province's true potential to be a national leader. To that end, he resolved to win the leadership of the provincial Progressive Conservative party and to navigate it into government. Before the leadership convention, Lougheed travelled around the province eagerly meeting supporters and constituency members to build his support base. Lougheed also started to build a team of supporters who followed him throughout his career including Roy Deyell, Merv Leitch, and Rod McDaniel, who took prominent positions in the Progressive Conservative Party.

In March 1965, Lougheed emerged victorious in the Progressive Conservative Party's leadership convention by defeating Duncan McKillop, a lawyer, who had previously run as the party's candidate for Calgary Queens Park in the 1963 election. The only other candidate, John Scott, a town councillor from Edson who had also entered the race, withdrew on the first day of the convention. Lougheed was nominated from the floor by Lou Hyndman and Charles Arthur Clark, father of future prime minister Joe Clark. Although the Progressive Conservative Association did not release the vote totals, biographer David G. Wood claimed that Lougheed received 91 per cent of the delegates' votes.

After becoming the party leader, Lougheed's first challenge was the 1966 by-election in Pincher Creek-Crowsnest following the death of the eighteen-year Social Credit representative William Kovach. Lougheed and his team campaigned vigorously for candidate Alexander Wells, but the Progressive Conservative finished third with 18.6 per cent of the vote, trailing both the successful New Democratic candidate Garth Turcott and the Social Credit candidate. Despite the defeat, Lougheed saw it as a minor setback.

During his time as leader of the Progressive Conservative Association, Lougheed took on the role of vice-president of the Calgary Olympic Development Association (CODA) for the Banff bid for the 1972 Winter Olympics, which was the eventual runner up bid in the International Olympic Committee vote behind Sapporo, Japan.

=== 1967 Alberta election ===
Lougheed focused on building momentum for the next general election. In the May 1967 election, Lougheed and his supporters worked tirelessly to convince candidates to run in all 65 constituencies, however, the Progressive Conservatives were only able to nominate 47 candidates, two more than the Liberal Party, but less than a full slate put forward by the Social Credit Party and the New Democratic Party. Lougheed sought candidates who were already public figures, often meeting with editors of local weekly newspapers, mayors and presidents of boards of trade to determine who the community's leaders were. As the writ came closer Lougheed and the Progressive Conservatives realized they could not form government and instead focused on a strategy of capturing Lougheed's seat in Calgary-West and forming the opposition. The campaign created red, white and blue promotional materials with the slogan "Alberta Needs an Alternative", while Lougheed's own material added his personal slogan "Let's Start It in Calgary West".

Lougheed sought a public debate amongst the four party leaders, however as a long-time incumbent Manning was not willing to risk a debate which could not benefit him. Manning's position on the debate changed when a group of Edmonton church leaders decided to host a leaders debate, Manning a devout Christian and host of "Back to the Bible Hour" radio broadcasts was forced to accepted the debate. Lougheed's performance in the debate was lauded by the Edmonton Journal and was credited by biographer George Wood with the growth in the Conservative movement in the Edmonton area, including Don Getty's improbable victory over Social Credit Education Minister Randolph McKinnon in Strathcona West. Other media began to take notice, including Maclean's which stated Lougheed was the only politician capable of having "an outside chance of challenging Manning".

Lougheed was subsequently elected to the legislature in Calgary-West garnering 62 per cent of the vote, and the Progressive Conservatives captured 26 per cent of the vote province-wide with five other successful candidates. With six elected MLAs, Lougheed became Leader of the Opposition. The group of elected Conservatives known as the "original six" included Calgary MLAs Len Werry, and David Russell; Edmonton area MLAs Lou Hyndman and Don Getty, and the party's only rural candidate and former federal Member of Parliament Hugh Horner. Following the 1967 election, the Edmonton Journal positively remarked on Lougheed's success, stating that Albertans now had a responsible and credible alternative in opposition.

== Leader of the Opposition ==
On February 15, 1968, the 16th Alberta Legislature gathered and Lougheed assumed his position as Leader of the Opposition, seated across the aisle from Premier Manning.

Ernest Manning, who had been Alberta's Premier since 1943, was aware of the declining support for Social Credit. In the 1967 election, the party received a disappointing 44.6 per cent of the popular vote, the first time under his leadership that they had failed to secure at least 50 per cent. On September 27, 1968, Manning announced his intention to retire from public office. After a leadership contest, Harry Strom succeeded him as Premier on December 12, 1968. In an ominous sign of the rise of Lougheed's Progressive Conservatives, the Social Credit party was defeated in the February 1969 by-election in Manning's former constituency by Progressive Conservative candidate William Yurko. Yurko received 45.7 per cent of the vote compared to the Social Credit candidate's 40.3 per cent.

As Premier, Strom was described by Lougheed biographer Allan Tupper as an "easier opponent" than Manning, although both Tupper and Wood considered Strom as an earnest individual of high integrity, but lacked dynamism, experience and shrewdness. One of the challenges Strom faced was the need to modernize the rural-focused Social Credit Party to better reflect the growing urbanization in Alberta, something he was not able to effectively accomplish. Furthermore, the Social Credit government was predominantly composed of older members, with the average MLA age in 1969 of 54 years of age, and 16 of the 54 members being above the age of 60. In contrast, the Progressive Conservative caucus had an average age under 40. Strom pressed for "a new and more positive relationship with the federal government".

In the Legislature Lougheed oversaw daily caucus strategy meetings to plan and rehearse questions. Each day the Lougheed opposition prepared questions for only one government Minister, ignoring all other Ministers, with the target Minister changing each day. The strategy combined with Lougheed's legal training and sophistication was effective at creating suspense and concern in the government caucus.

Lougheed's success in Alberta was noticed by other conservatives across Canada, he was invited to be the keynote speaker by federal Progressive Conservatives at the 1968 convention in Toronto. During the 1970 spring session, Lougheed moved to position the Progressive Conservatives as a credible alternative to the Social Credit party. His party introduced 21 bills, an unusually large number for an opposition party in a Westminster system where a majority government can usually run roughshod over the legislature.

Through by-elections, Lougheed's Progressive Conservative caucus further grew from the "Original Six" with the election of Robert Dowling in the October 1969 Edson by-election, Bill Dickie a long-time friend of Lougheed crossing the floor from the Liberals to join his caucus in November 1969, and Banff-Cochrane independent representative Clarence Copithorne joining the party in April 1971. This growth saw the Lougheed-led Progressive Conservatives enter the August 1971 election with 10 incumbents.

=== 1971 general election ===
On April 27, 1971, the 16th Legislature was prorogued, and was dissolved three months later on July 22 with an election day set on August 30, 1971. Prior to the 1971 election, a number of changes to Alberta's electoral process occurred. Electoral district boundaries were redrawn and the number of members to be elected was increased from 65 to 75. The Age of Majority Act lowered the voting age from 21 to 18 years.

Since mid-1970, the Progressive Conservative Party had been preparing for an election to be called. They established slogans and branding which was centrally controlled, unlike previous instances in Alberta where individual constituencies were free to develop their own materials. This centralization aimed to reinforce the party's key messages and ensure repetition in the eyes of voters. An advertising budget of $120,000 (equivalent to CA$628,517 in 2025) was set to provide $80,000 for television advertisements and the rest of other materials for constituencies across the province. Unlike Social Credit's use of radio for the less outgoing Strom, Lougheed's focus was on television. Lougheed's team was careful with messaging, stressing the idea of the Progressive Conservative providing an "alternative" rather than "opposition". Prior to the election, Lougheed went on a 40-day tour that brought him to each constituency to "meet and greet" with potential voters.

On August 30, Albertans went to the polls and elected Peter Lougheed's Progressive Conservative Association. The Progressive Conservatives captured 49 of 75 seats in the 17th Alberta Legislature with 46.4 per cent of the popular vote. The victory included a complete sweep of 16 electoral districts in Edmonton and 9 of 13 in Calgary. Lougheed himself won his district with 55.2 per cent of the vote in Calgary-West.

Many observers argue that the Progressive Conservative victory in 1971 was primarily a result of Lougheed's charisma, combined with growing urbanization and an out-of-touch Social Credit government. Lewis G. Thomas argues that Lougheed evoked an image of the traditional elite with his business background which appealed to the province which was undergoing economic growth and prosperity brought on by non-renewable resources, which contrasted the old-fashioned image of the social credit government. Other scholars share similar views that include Lougheed as the saviour of the urban middle class that was seeking a revigorated government aligned with the province's new resource age. Edward Bell counters this argument stating that Lougheed's victory in 1971 was in no way guaranteed before the writ was dropped. Bell argues the Social Credit's poor relationships with unions and Strom's weak campaign led to the progressive conservatives narrow victory of 5.3 percentage points. The media heralded Lougheed's victory as an upset, with the Calgary Albertan claiming "PC's Pull Off Socred Upset", and the Calgary Herald headline "It Is 'Now' for Lougheed; Stunning Alberta Upset Puts PC's in Power".

== Premier (1971–1985) ==
=== Electoral history ===
On September 10, 1971, Peter Lougheed was sworn in as Alberta's tenth premier by Lieutenant Governor Grant MacEwan. Lougheed was set with a majority government in the legislature and a Social Credit opposition of 25 members, which would be the largest opposition Lougheed would face in his 14-year career as Premier.

In the leadup to the 1975 election, Lougheed enjoyed strong support in his constituency which allowed him to focus his campaign efforts across the province. The Progressive Conservatives campaigned a platform on administrative competence and promises outlined in an unpassed 1975–1976 budget. Leaning on successful negotiations with the federal and Ontario governments and oil companies for the development of oil sands in the Winnipeg Agreement only 11 days before the legislature was dissolved. Other promises included the creation of the Alberta Heritage Savings Trust Fund, reduction of personal income taxes by at least 28 per cent, and increased social program spending, all of which were built on growing non-renewable natural resource revenue resulting from the 1970s energy crisis. Lougheed was the centre of the campaign evidenced by the Progressive Conservative slogans "Lougheed Leadership", "43 Months of Progress", and "Vote Today for Alberta". Opposition criticized Lougheed for interfering in the marketplace, such as by the 1974 purchase of Pacific Western Airlines for $37.5-million (equivalent to $235-million in 2025) and authorizing spending with Order-in-Council, instead of appropriations through the legislature. But they did not sway voters.

To no one's surprise, the Progressive Conservative Party won a lopsided victory in 1975, capturing 62.7 per cent of the vote and 69 of 75 seats in the legislature (92 percent of the seats). The Edmonton Report cover featured a caricature of Peter Lougheed following the victory accompanied by the title "Peter The Greatest".

During the 1979 election, Lougheed and the Progressive Conservative party gained popularity, with Lougheed campaigning on the informal slogan "79 in '79" in reference to winning all 79 seats in the legislature. Although they received a slightly lower percentage of the popular vote than in 1975, at 57.4 per cent, they gained five additional seats for a total of 74 out of 79 seats in the legislature. The public was strongly supportive of Lougheed and the Progressive Conservatives, and headlines predicted that they would win with a comfortable majority. Meanwhile, the opposition leaders, including Grant Notley of the New Democratic Party, Nick Taylor of the Liberal Party, and Bob Clark of the Social Credit Party, did not publicly discuss the possibility of winning a majority out of concern that it would harm their credibility. Lougheed's main concern was preventing complacency among candidates and volunteers, and he personally campaigned throughout the province to address these concerns.

The 1982 election marked Lougheed's final as Premier. Lougheed utilized the constitutional debates and focus on Alberta's complete control over natural resources to gain increased support from the electorates. The Progressive Conservatives improved their popular support to capture 62.3 per cent of the popular vote and 75 of the 79 seats in the legislature, a landslide victory and the second-largest majority government in Alberta's history. During the election Lougheed noted it would be his last election. Lougheed focused his campaign primarily on provincial issues and refused to use the name of opposition parties, instead referring to them as "knockers", and his Progressive Conservatives as "doers". He declined any television or public debates, which led to Western Canada Concept leader Gordon Kesler to crash one of Lougheed's events to challenge the Premier to a debate. Lougheed also pushed the same strategy for his candidates as previous years, requiring them to canvass door-to-door as if they were behind in the polls.

Lougheed announced his retirement from politics in on June 26, 1985. A number of candidates campaigned to succeed Lougheed as the leader of the Progressive Conservatives and Premier of Alberta. In the 1985 Progressive Conservative Association of Alberta leadership election original Progressive Conservative caucus from 1967 and later a longtime member of the Lougheed cabinet Don Getty defeated MLA Julian Koziak to become Premier of Alberta. Getty was officially sworn in on November 1, 1985, ending Lougheed's term as premier.

=== Alberta Legislature and governance ===
After his election in 1971, Lougheed sought to increase contact between Albertans and legislators by addressing accessibility, visibility and accountability of the Legislative Assembly. In his government's first Speech from the Throne, Lieutenant Governor Grant MacEwan spoke extensively of the principles of open government. One of Lougheed's initial actions was installing cameras to record and broadcast meetings of the legislature beginning on March 15, 1972, and the beginning of the Hansard series to produce a written record of debates on March 8, 1972.

Lougheed's government made significant transformations to policy and finance through the legislature. Several legislative policy committees were created in 1975 consisting of members of the Progressive Conservative caucus, and did not include members of the opposition. Lougheed also consistently funded programs using special warrants authorized by cabinet and issued by the Lieutenant Governor, these warrants were not included in any budgets provided to the legislature and were not made public until after the decision to spend was approved. Critics argued that the use of special warrants removed the ability of the opposition, members of caucus or the public to hold the government to account.

Lougheed's popularity during his premiership resulted in progressive conservative majority governments with only a limited number of opposition members. Lougheed became creative to provide additional responsibility to members of his caucus, including mandatory caucus meetings which he chaired. In 1975 he removed the requirement for caucus to operate by consensus, owing to the large number of members, instead a vote was called on all issues, and Lougheed often required a two-thirds majority for important issues. Furthermore, Cabinet members were required to attend caucus meetings, and all members were seated in alphabetical order. Lougheed refused to use the term backbencher instead referring to caucus members as either "ministers" or "private members". Non-political attendance in caucus meetings was limited to only four staff members from the Premier's Office. Lougheed required legislators to seek caucus approval to miss caucus meetings or publicly dissent with a position of caucus, which required either a reason of conscience or a constituency issue. When Progressive Conservative member Tom Sindlinger publicly disagreed with matters related to the Heritage Savings Trust Fund, Constitutional patriation, and freedom of information, he was expelled from caucus and the Progressive Conservative Party.

"Attracting good candidates." — Peter Lougheed, Response to "single out one item as your political legacy, what would it be?"

When selecting members for his cabinet, Lougheed took the approach that first-hand knowledge may be a detriment to the success of the minister. Lougheed wanted ministers to take on the role without any preconceived notions. For instance Hugh Horner, a doctor, was appointed minister of agriculture and Lou Hyndman, a lawyer, was appointed minister of education. Lougheed completely shuffled his Cabinet upon re-election in 1975 and 1979, with no minister retaining the same portfolio. This changed after the 1982 election when he reappointed several ministers to the same portfolios. Lougheed also oversaw an expansion of the size of Cabinet, which assisted in providing regional representation.

Based on his experience in opposition, Lougheed named an opposition member as the chair of the Standing Committee on Public Accounts. However, political scientist Engelmann called the appointment "window-dressing" as the committee consists of a majority of government caucus members, and prior to changes under Premier Don Getty in 1990, the chair was not permitted to present a report of the committee to the legislature.

=== Energy policies ===
Lougheed, while serving as the leader of the opposition, accused the Social Credit government of not ensuring Albertans received fair value from the exploitation of public non-renewable natural resources. As Premier, Lougheed implemented several policies to increase the value of Alberta's resources, counter federal programs he viewed as threats and expand development in the oil sands.

"This appears to be the most discriminatory action taken by a federal government against a particular province in the entire history of confederation" — Peter Lougheed, Canadian Club speech in Calgary, September 14, 1973. In regard to export taxes instituted by the federal government.

Shortly after he was elected in 1972, Lougheed announced major changes to the province's oil and gas royalty structures to increase Alberta's share of resource revenue and entrench the provincial government's control over those resources. The previous Social Credit government established a maximum royalty rate at 16.66 per cent, and Lougheed was willing to permit existing leases to continue until they expired and all new leases would be issued at a new higher rate. However, in the wake of the 1973 oil crisis Prime Minister Pierre Trudeau implemented an expanded National Oil Policy which included an export tax on oil. This resulted in domestic oil prices below international levels, all of which disproportionally affected Alberta. Lougheed used the export tax to claim force majeure and cancel all existing oil and gas leases, and reissued them under the new higher royalty rate. These higher royalty rates became contentious later in 1974 when the federal government revised the corporate tax code to no longer permit petroleum companies to deduct provincial royalties from taxable income. Lougheed and Trudeau came to a compromise in early 1975 which allowed the gradual increase in domestic oil prices to near world prices, while creating a buffer to protect manufacturing centers and consumers.

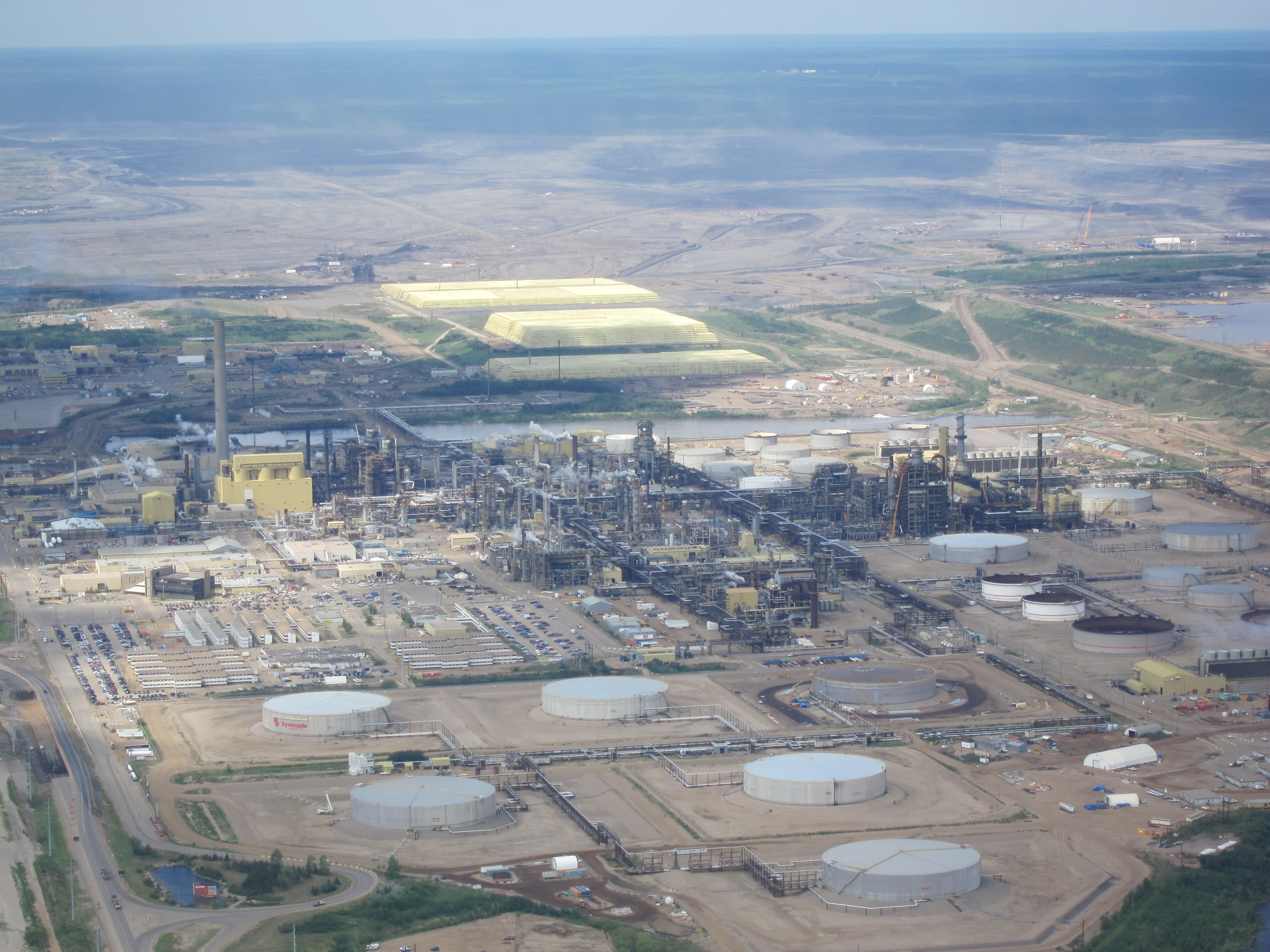
Minesite at Syncrude's Mildred Lake plant

The early 1970s brought the possibility of large-scale oil and gas exploration in the Athabasca oil sands through the Syncrude project. The major negotiations between the Government of Alberta and the consortium of Imperial Oil, Gulf Canada, Atlantic Richfield Canada, and Canada-Cities Service occurred in August 1973 and was led by Lougheed and Energy Minister Don Getty. Lougheed's goals with Syncrude were to get the project off the ground with the province receiving a fair royalty, and Albertans having the opportunity to invest in the project. Lougheed negotiated the royalty to take a similar form to profit sharing and insisted the connecting pipeline be 80 per cent owned by the province, the site powerplant 50 per cent owned by the province, and an option to acquire a 20 per cent ownership stake in the Syncrude project at a later date. The Syncrude negotiations between the government and the consortium were tense, with Don Getty staging a walk-out following an ultimatum letter sent to the Province from the consortium. While an agreement was reached in late-August 1973 which met Lougheed's intended goals, the project began to unravel one year later when in December 1974 Atlantic Richfield backed out of the project when cost estimates doubled. The project was not feasible without a federal government commitment for petroleum price assurances and financial backing. Lougheed and Getty met with other firms to fill Atlantic Richfield's place, and in February 1975 the consortium met with the governments of Alberta, Ontario, and Canada in the neutral site of Winnipeg with negotiations including federal ministers Jean Chrétien and Donald Macdonald, Ontario contingent led by Premier Bill Davis, and the Alberta contingent led by Lougheed, Getty, Leitch and Dickie. The Winnipeg Agreement resulted in Ontario purchasing 5 per cent of the project, Alberta 10 per cent, and the federal government 15 per cent. Alberta also took full cost and ownership of the pipeline and powerplant through the Alberta Energy Company and provided a $200 million loan. A legacy of the Syncrude deal was the growth of Fort McMurray, a small community of 6,847 in 1971 that grew to 31,000 by 1981. Future developments in the Athabasca oil sands were not as successful for Lougheed, with the $13.5 billion Alsands project falling apart in 1982.

Lougheed sought greater provincial control over oil and gas resources and to reduce federal government incursions in natural resource development. Lougheed was successful in leveraged government investment in the place of private investment to achieve his goal. The province took administrative control over natural gas pricing with the Natural Gas Pricing Agreement Act and incorporated the Alberta Energy Company in 1974 to focus on petroleum, pipeline, and petrochemical processing. The establishment of the Alberta Petroleum Marketing Commission further expanded the government's authority in the sale of non-renewable natural resources, as well as construction, purchasing, and leases related to petroleum facilities.

In 1980, the Trudeau government implemented the National Energy Program with the rationale that Canadian ownership and control of natural resources was paramount to national energy security. Trudeau also argued that Canada's energy policy had become divisive and must achieve greater fairness in revenue sharing. While the program increased domestic price controls, the emphasis on revenue sharing and incentives for oil exploration on federally owned lands was viewed critically by Lougheed. Lougheed fought the program vigorously in the courts and in public, where he actively stoked Alberta nationalism in a television address claiming the program would bring more "Ottawa" to the province. Prior to the announcement of the National Energy Program, Lougheed had threatened to reduce Alberta's production of oil and gas to counter any federal program to increase taxes. If Alberta reduced production, Central Canada refineries and other businesses would need to purchase foreign oil which would be heavily subsidized by the federal government, a cost that it could not afford to with a $13.7 billion deficit in 1980. Lougheed finally decided to exercise this authority to force Trudeau to concede some measures of the Program, and Lougheed announced on television a 60,000 barrel reduction to Alberta's production of crude oil to take place over nine months beginning in April 1981, and the suspension of two oil sands projects. Lougheed however pledged that he would not allow a national oil shortage to occur, and would suspend the cuts if a shortage occurred. The threat was successful as negotiations between the federal and provincial governments to amend the National Energy Program proceeded in 1981 to remove certain unpalatable aspects for Alberta. Lougheed's success in the Oil Accord was marked by a widely published photograph of a celebratory champagne toast with Trudeau and himself, Lougheed later admitted to regretting the toast.

Lougheed's battle with the National Energy Program corresponded with the 1980s oil glut where energy prices dropped dramatically due to falling demand. Lougheed was forced to lower royalty rates through the Oil and Gas Activity Program and focused the government's efforts on natural gas diversification to stem falling revenues and a declining economy. Finally, in March 1985, only months before his retirement Lougheed, British Columbia Premier Bill Bennett, Saskatchewan Premier Grant Devine, and federal Progressive Conservative Minister of Energy, Mines and Resources Patricia Carney agreed to the Western Accord which removed the remaining aspects of the National Energy Program and returned the Canadian energy industry to market-driven prices.

Critics have argued that Lougheed undertook a hostile and polarizing campaign toward federal oil and gas policy which forced Albertans to choose between provincial and national citizenship. The growing hostility fueled Alberta separatism which most visibly manifested itself in the election of separatist Gordon Kesler to the Legislative Assembly of Alberta in 1982. Furthermore, when Alberta Conservative Joe Clark became prime minister for a short period in 1979–1980, very little was done in the way of aligning domestic oil prices with the higher international prices, in part due to the significant hardship the higher market prices would have on other provinces and Canadian consumers.

=== Federal-provincial relations ===
Lougheed's provincial-dominated view of Canadian federalism remains one of his most visible and longstanding impacts on Alberta and Canadian history. Historian Michael D. Behiels compares Lougheed's role in the repatriation of the Canadian Constitution to that of 19th-century Ontario Premier Oliver Mowat who helped transform John A. Macdonald's vision of Canadian government into one of coordinated sovereign powers. Amongst his most significant accomplishments in the 1970–1980s constitutional debates was the inclusion of the amending formula based on Alberta's proposal, which requires an amendment to the constitution to take place with the agreement of the federal government and at least seven provinces representing 50 per cent of the Canadian population. The amending formula also included an opt-out provision which requires the consent of the province if amendments affecting existing provincial rights were considered. Lougheed's vision for the amending formula highlighted the rights of individual provinces rather than regions to ensure equity, and there would be no effective veto for a single province, which represented a major deviation from amending formulas proposed in prior constitutional talks. Along with the amending formula, Lougheed's constitutional legacy includes the inclusion of the notwithstanding clause which provides legislatures with the authority to supersede certain provisions of the Charter of Rights and Freedoms.

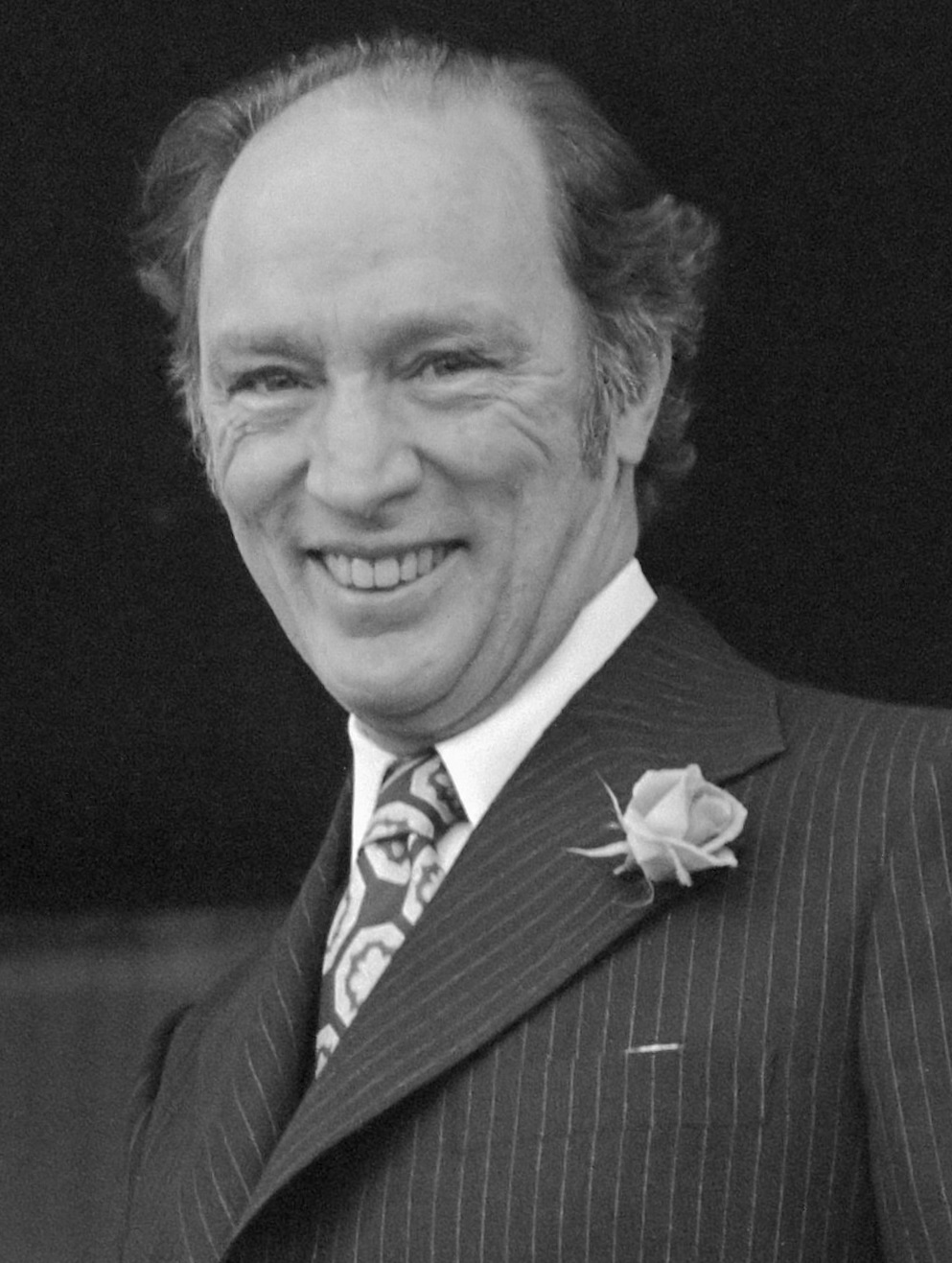
Pierre Elliott Trudeau served as prime minister for a majority of Lougheed's Premiership

Lougheed's constitutional influence began following his election in 1971 through two actions, first by rejecting the basis of the proposed Victoria Charter, and second by creating the Ministry of Federal and Intergovernmental Affairs. The Ministry was tasked with overseeing all intergovernmental matters and grew into the center of the political battles between the provincial and federal governments. The Ministry proved effective and helped usher the transition of Alberta from a junior province into a leading province in constitutional debates.

Prime Minister Trudeau's failure to gain support for the Victoria Charter did not deter him from continuing to push for major constitutional reform. Trudeau's primary objective was to ensure the patriation of the Canadian constitution. Additionally, he aimed to introduce changes such as an acceptable amending formula, the establishment of a Charter of Rights, and the advancement of federal powers. Trudeau's goals were in contrast with those of the provincial governments which were primarily led by Lougheed and Quebec Premier Robert Bourassa, and later René Lévesque. Lougheed sought greater authority over natural resources, Senate reform and reforms to the Supreme Court, while Bourassa and Lévesque sought greater recognition of Quebec's culture and language.

In late 1973, intergovernmental tensions were further inflamed in the wake of the oil crisis and the Trudeau government's export tax on Alberta oil. Lougheed publicly described the export tax as the most discriminatory action in Canadian history. Trudeau's actions further reinforced Lougheed's position that Alberta would only support Constitutional changes on the condition that provincial jurisdiction over resources was maintained. At the 1975 First Ministers' conference, Trudeau discussed reopening constitutional discussions which were limited to patriation exclusively. While all Premiers agreed patriation was desirable, Lougheed led the Premiers in demanding a general review of the distribution of powers, control of resources, and duplication of programs. Trudeau followed up the 1975 conference by submitting to each province a draft proclamation which provided three options, simple patriation, patriation with the Victoria Charter amending formula, and patriation with an updated Victoria Charter. Lougheed rejected the proposal and found an ally with Bourassa who submitted his own list of constitutional demands which expanded provincial jurisdiction. In 1978, Lougheed's government formally outlined the province's position in the paper Harmony in Diversity: A New Federalism for Canada which included the requirement for federal-provincial division of power to be protected by an amending formula which requires the consent of the provinces whose rights are subject to change. In October 1980, when Trudeau dismissed the threat of Alberta separatism as a bargaining tool from Western Canadians premiers, Lougheed agreed with him by telling Don Newman that no one in Western Canada wants to separate and they "a part of the mainstream of Canadian life".

Following an unsuccessful First Ministers Conference in September 1981, Trudeau began the process of unilateral constitutional repatriation led by the federal government alone. Ontario and New Brunswick were supportive of the federal government while the remaining provinces formed what would be dubbed the "Gang of Eight", whose positions were largely created by Lougheed. Reference questions were submitted to the Court of Appeals in Quebec, Manitoba and Newfoundland by their respective governments on the question of unilateral patriation. Lougheed brought forward a resolution in the Legislature stating Alberta would only support patriation if there were safeguards for provincial rights, no amendments would diminish provincial rights, and the federal government did not proceed unilaterally. Lougheed then boycotted parliamentary hearings on patriation and joined the other Premiers in warning Trudeau against patriation before the Supreme Court ruled on whether unilateral patriation was constitutional.

=== Foreign affairs ===
Lougheed spearheaded the provincial push for a fresh approach to bilateral trade at the national level, which ultimately came to fruition with the Canada-United States Free Trade Agreement. During the 1985 First Ministers' Conference in Regina, Lougheed promoted the idea on television, highlighting the potential for Canadian entrepreneurs to participate in the North American market. Lougheed was meticulous in planning his visits to Washington, ensuring every aspect was perfectly executed, as was characteristic of his premiership. Canadian ambassador to the United States, Allan Gotlieb, who served from 1981 to 1989, praised Lougheed as one of the most effective Canadian politicians to work with Congress. Lougheed relied on his close relationship with Washington Senator Henry M. Jackson to gain access to elected officials in Congress during his initial trips to the U.S. Capital.

In 1979, Lougheed created the position of Minister of Foreign Trade and appointed Horst Schmid to the role. During his time in office, Lougheed undertook various official international trips, and he was often accompanied by his wife, Jeanne. Lougheed believed that having his wife present would encourage foreign dignitaries to include their spouses, thereby altering the visit's atmosphere. Lougheed's official visits included Japan in 1972, Europe in 1975, the United States in 1976, and China and Japan in 1983. Additionally, in 1977, Lougheed embarked on an ambitious official visit to the Middle East, Soviet Union and Switzerland. During this trip, Soviet Premier Alexei Kosygin made a public acknowledgment of Lougheed's contribution to Canadian public life.

=== Environment policy ===
Lougheed's tenure as Premier saw major environmental changes in the province. The government evaluated a number of ways to improve environmental and recreational access for Albertans. In 1975 Fish Creek Park was created in Calgary, purchasing land from Lougheed's former boss Frederick Charles Mannix, and later in 1977 Lougheed's government created Kananaskis Provincial Park, which would eventually be renamed Peter Lougheed Provincial Park. Lougheed credited Calgary architect Bill Milne and Highways and Transport Minister Clarence Copithorne with the idea for the new provincial park. Other efforts were taken to create urban parks in Edmonton, Grande Prairie, and Medicine Hat funded through the Heritage Savings Trust Fund.

=== Economic development ===
Peter Lougheed aimed to leverage the province's natural resource revenues to stimulate economic development and diversification in Alberta.

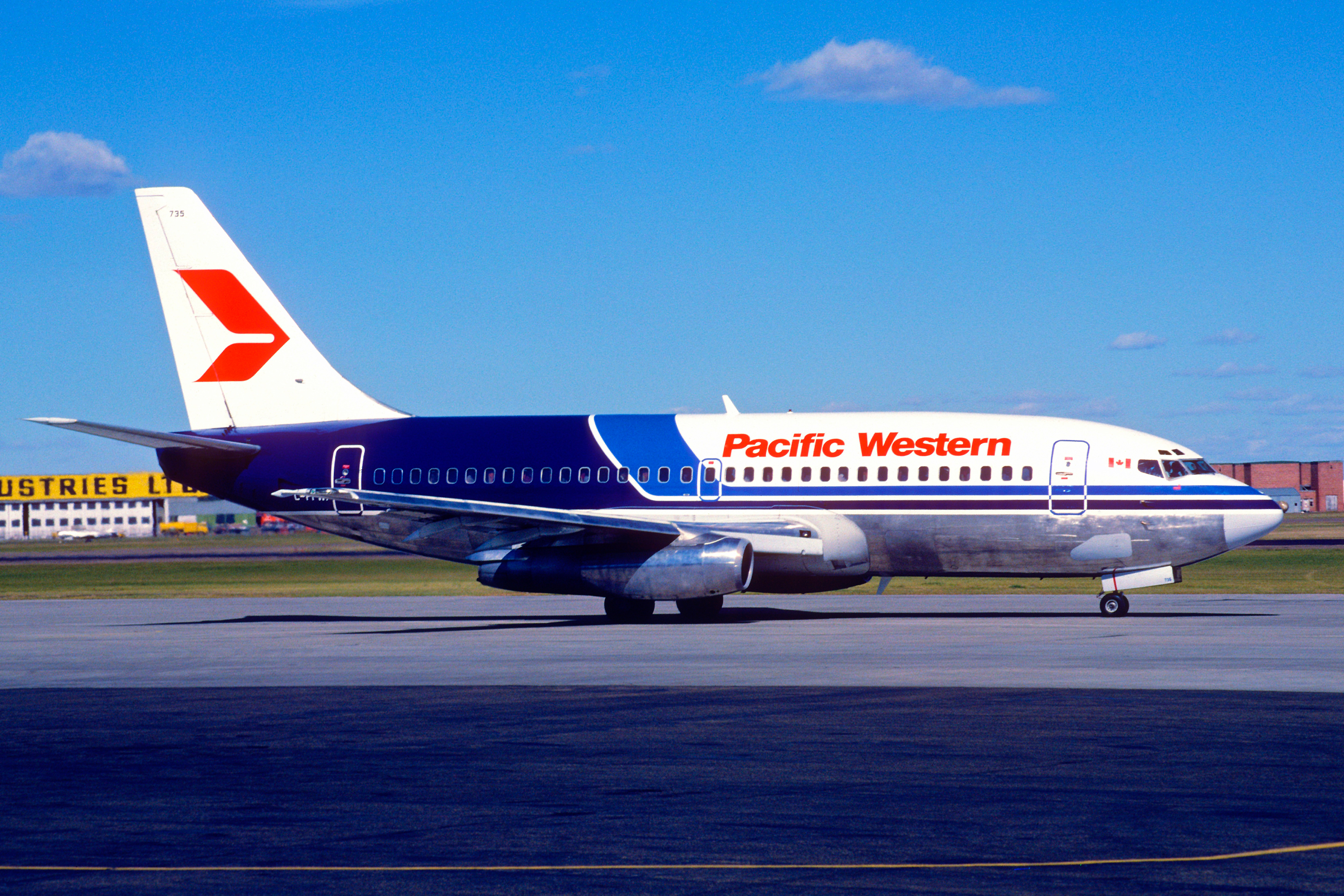
Pacific Western Airlines Boeing 737-200

In 1974, the Lougheed government purchased Pacific Western Airlines in part to assure the development of the North and Western Canada, and position Alberta as the gateway to the north. The province purchased the airline for $37.5 million (equivalent to $235 million in 2025) during a secret takeover bid. The Alberta government moved quickly out of worries British Columbia NDP Premier Dave Barrett had a similar plan to purchase the airline. The decision was highly controversial in Alberta and drew criticism from the business community and fiscal conservatives in the Progressive Conservative caucus. Following the acquisition, the headquarters for the airline was moved to Calgary, and Calgary International Airport became the new hub. In 1983, the Lougheed government sold the airline for $37.7 million (equivalent to $107 million in 2025) following a campaign promising to do so during the 1982 Alberta general election.

Late in his Premiership Lougheed oversaw the early stages of the collapse of Principal Group, a consortium of Canadian financial companies headquartered in Edmonton. The operating licences for two of the Principal Group's subsidiaries were cancelled by Alberta Treasurer Dick Johnston on June 30, 1987, and six weeks later the Principal Group declared bankruptcy owing more than 67,000 investors approximately $468 million (equivalent to $1122 million in 2025). While the collapse occurred under Don Getty's premiership, Lougheed created a special cabinet task force that met weekly in 1985 to discuss the impending collapse, and financial regulators had pressed for action a year earlier. An inquiry found the Progressive Conservative government went to considerable lengths to prevent enforcement actions against certain companies to preserve public confidence. While Lougheed was not directly named, the inquiry found the actions by government ministers aligned with Lougheed's "province-building" policy.

In 1984, his government published a White Paper on industrial and scientific strategy, which recognized that the oil-led boom had come to an end. The paper highlighted oil and gas as the primary "engine of growth" while also portraying financial institutions positively, despite the government's knowledge of the dire financial situations of several Alberta-based businesses, including the Principal Group, Canadian Commercial Bank, and Northland Bank.

=== Culture ===
Lougheed inherited a province with a significant rural focus and a department of Culture that focused on pioneering agricultural events such as the Calgary Stampede, Klondike Days, and rural-based 4-H clubs. Future Canadian Parliamentary Poet Laureate George Bowering who attended the University of Alberta had described Alberta in the 1960s as "a cultural desert". Under Lougheed's leadership, Alberta transitioned from a restrictive, moralistic and rural-based province to a growingly urban and modern society.

In the leadup to the 1971 election, Lougheed committed his government to a "mosaic" approach to culture, which promoted different cultures and opportunities to expose Albertans to experiencing other cultures and traditions. After the election, Lougheed appointed Horst Schmid as Minister for Culture who began an aggressive campaign to promote the arts in Alberta. Strengthened by revenues from oil and gas development the government began a matching grant program for private donations to arts organizations, up to 25 per cent of an organization's budget. The budget for the department of culture dramatically rose from $280,000 in 1971 to $7.5 million by 1979.

In 1974, the province created Heritage Day as a provincial holiday to celebrate cultural diversity, and Edmonton held its first Heritage Festival. Other festivals started during this time include Edmonton Folk Music Festival in 1980 and Edmonton Fringe Festival in 1982. Lougheed's government also established a number of foundations including for art, literary arts, and performing arts. As part of Alberta's 75th anniversary, the province sponsored The Canadian Encyclopedia, providing $3.4 million to develop the encyclopedia, and another $600,000 to provide a free copy to every school and library in Canada. Lougheed's government strongly supported Edmonton's bid for the 1978 Commonwealth Games, and Calgary's bid for the 1988 Winter Olympic Games.

Fil Fraser attributes much of Lougheed's support for the arts to his wife Jeanne who had studied voice, music and dance. Jeanne advocated on behalf of the arts as a way to "nurture the spirit" of Albertans. Fraser notes that the Lougheed's advocated for the arts through being true patrons, constantly attending and participating in events across the province, both large and small. Jeanne held numerous board positions for Alberta cultural organizations including her "baby", the Alberta Ballet Company.

=== Relationship with federal Progressive Conservatives ===
Lougheed transformed the Progressive Conservative Association of Alberta from a marginal party into a dynasty that governed Alberta for over 40 years. Prior to his leadership, the party was unable to attract significant attention or high quality candidates, despite the success of the federal Progressive Conservatives in Alberta. Many of the active members and volunteers for the federal Progressive Conservatives were members and volunteers for the provincial Social Credit party. Lougheed was able to build a party from scratch bringing political and apolitical people under the Progressive Conservative tent that would not only bring himself into power, but result in greater support the federal party as well. Lougheed thought it was important that the public perceive the dominant figure in any provincial party be the leader, and not the leader of the federal equivalent.

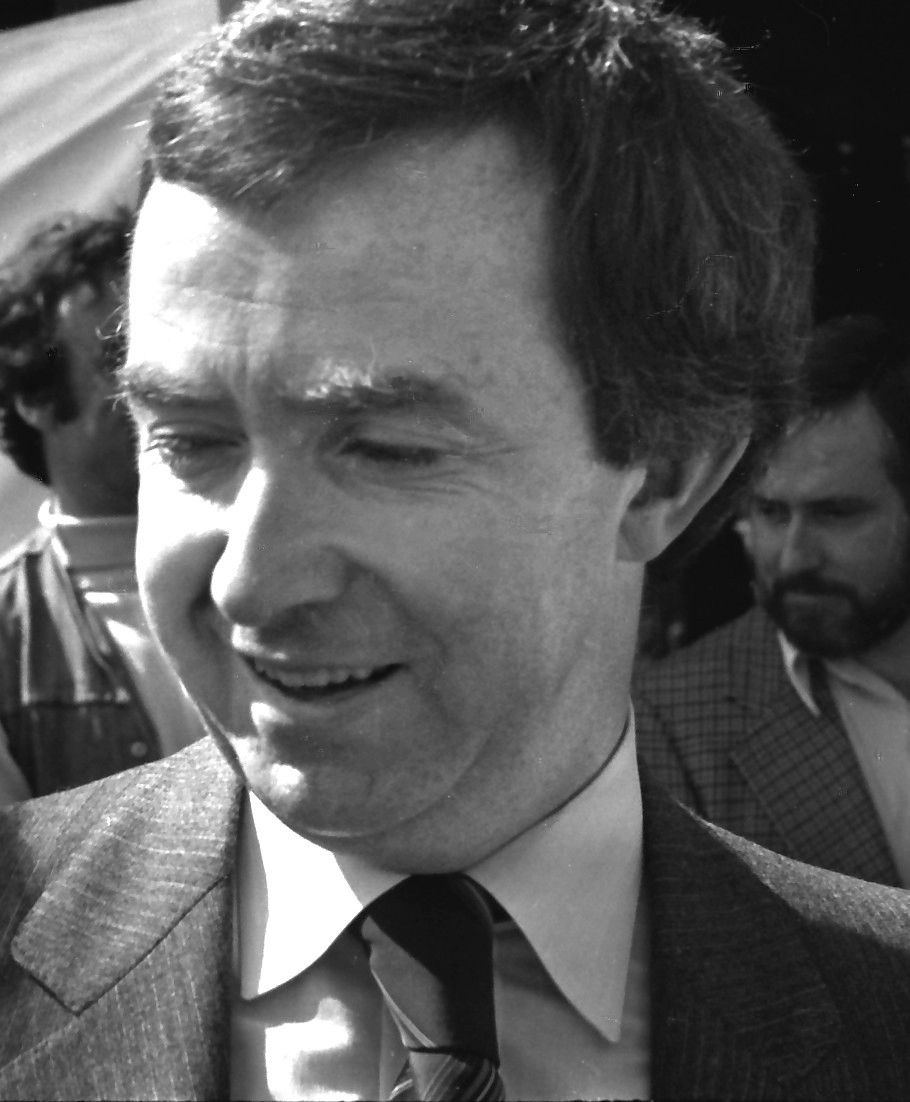
Joe Clark began his political career as a volunteer and candidate for Lougheed in the 1960s, and later served as prime minister

Starting in 1965, future prime minister Joe Clark took a significant role in Lougheed's Progressive Conservatives, moving from volunteer to paid full-time field worker assisting Lougheed in finding candidates for the 1967 election. Clark became a candidate himself in the 1967 election in Calgary South, losing a close election to Arthur J. Dixon. Robert Dinkel served as a campaign manager for the 1967 Progressive Conservatives, and later served as the Alberta manager for Joe Clark's successful 1979 federal bid.

Later during his Premiership, Lougheed was viewed as a potential leader for the federal Progressive Conservatives. Biographer David Wood describes several instances where federal organizers attempted to woo Lougheed into leading the party. Wood describes a meeting in Halifax in 1975 where Lougheed attended the Nova Scotia provincial Progressive Conservative meeting which occurred simultaneously with a federal meeting. Federal leader Robert Stanfield allegedly asked if Lougheed was interested in taking over the leadership from him, and later "twenty or more" federal party members visited his hotel room urging Lougheed to run. Later Hal Jackman and other Ontario Conservatives led a movement to gain support in Ontario for a Lougheed federal run, going so far as to send a five-foot Christmas card with 800 signatures on it and holding rallies in support. Despite his efforts, Lougheed rejected the repeated offers from Jackman. Lougheed described his reason for not making the move federally in 1976 as a responsibility to Albertans after the recent election win in 1975, although Lougheed did remark "the timing wasn't right. It might have been right in 1977 or 1978".

Lougheed was also rumored to make the move to the federal party in the 1983 Progressive Conservative leadership election, with growing party and media attention on his potential bid. Lougheed's wife Jeanne and son Joe urged Lougheed to make the jump to federal politics. However, Lougheed once again declined to make the jump to federal politics, admitting his age (54), inability to speak French fluently, and that he did not have the energy to campaign and learn French at the same time. To put the issue to rest, Lougheed returned to Edmonton early from a vacation in Hawaii and held a news conference to take himself out of the race. While Lougheed did not see an inability to speak French as a significant issue for a federal leadership candidate in the mid-1970s, he acknowledged the growing Quebec nationalist movement had made fluency a prerequisite for any federal leadership candidate. Ontario Premier Bill Davis sought the federal Progressive Conservative leadership in 1983, and asked for Lougheed's endorsement. Lougheed emphatically declined, owing to Davis' refusal to join other Premiers in 1981 on a united energy policy for Canada. Furthermore, Lougheed could not support Joe Clark in retaining his position, and while Lougheed pledged to remain neutral, he did encourage Albertans to "take a good look" at the eventual winner Brian Mulroney for leader.

== Later life ==
Lougheed officially resigned his seat in the Alberta Legislature on February 27, 1986, and returned to private life at the age of 57. After his retirement from politics, Lougheed remained active in government, legal and business affairs, joining Calgary-based law firm Bennett Jones as a partner in 1985, sitting on the Canadian Alliance for Trade and Job Opportunities to promote the Canada-United States Free Trade Agreement in 1987 and serving as the co-chair of the Canada-Japan Forum in 1991. Lougheed served as an honorary chair of the Calgary Olympic Winter Games Organizing Committee.

Lougheed was named to the board of directors of a number of Canadian businesses, and at one time held a seat on 17 different boards. These corporations included ATCO, Royal Bank of Canada, Princeton Developments, Nortel, CFCN Communications, Bombardier, Canadian Pacific Railway, Keyera, Carlson Construction and a number of other businesses. Lougheed continued to support the development of Alberta's natural gas industry, becoming the chair of the Alberta Northeast Gas project which promoted the construction of the Iroquois Pipeline. Lougheed was named a member of the Trilateral Commission.

In 1996 Lougheed was appointed Chancellor of Queen's University, succeeding Agnes Benidickson, a title he held until 2002. Lougheed made the decision on the advice of his two sons who attended Queen's. In 2002 Lougheed was appointed to the inaugural board of directors for the Pierre Elliott Trudeau Foundation.

=== Political involvement ===
Lougheed rarely commented on Alberta's public policy or the Progressive Conservative Party following his resignation as Premier. Lougheed did not endorse any candidate as his successor, nor did he endorse a candidate in the 1992 Progressive Conservative leadership race. In 2006, Lougheed's position changed after the resignation of Premier Ralph Klein, and he began to make occasional political statements and take interviews where he discussed public policy. Late in the 2006 Progressive Conservative leadership election, Lougheed endorsed the eventual runner-up Jim Dinning and in the 2011 leadership race, Lougheed's endorsement of Alison Redford was seen by observers as a difference-maker for her successful campaign.

Lougheed did make occasional statements in support or opposition of successor Progressive Conservative premiers. In a 1995 interview, Lougheed was critical of Conservative government cuts to social services following the early 1990s recession, both targeting Ontario Premier Mike Harris and Alberta Premier Ralph Klein. In 2006, days before Klein's leadership review, Lougheed took out an op-ed in the Globe and Mail, saying that while Alberta should control its resources, it should it take a leading role in confederation by investing in Canada for national unity. In a June 2006 interview with Edmonton Journal reporter Gordon Jaremko, Lougheed criticized Alberta's royalty structure and called for a review of non-renewable resource royalties, which had been significantly reduced by the Klein government in the 1990s to spur development. The interview came months after Klein announced his retirement and created a significant policy issue in the 2006 Progressive Conservative leadership race. Shortly after winning the Progressive Conservative leadership, Premier Ed Stelmach called for the Alberta Royalty Review.

Lougheed was a staunch supporter of the Charlottetown Accord and saw it as an opportunity for Quebec to sign onto the Constitution as a full partner. In a 1992 essay for Maclean's, Lougheed supported a number of concessions for Quebec, including an elected Senate with equal representation from each province, agreed it was fair for Quebec to guarantee 25 per cent representation in the House of Commons, agreed to require a majority of Quebec Senators approve legislation affecting French language or culture, and three members of the Supreme Court of Canada from Quebec and trained in Quebec's civil code. While Lougheed did not support additional engrained rights for Indigenous persons, claiming that it would create a new order of government, he accepted the consensus to include the provisions in the Charlottetown Accord. Lougheed also advocated for a "citizen assembly" composed of elected representatives from each province to negotiate Constitutional reforms as a fallback measure if the Charlottetown Accord failed. Under his plan, no current members of federal or provincial legislatures would have been eligible to participate, and members of the citizen assembly would be barred from running for a seat in a federal or provincial legislatures for six years.

=== Illness and death ===
Lougheed had long been suffering from a heart condition and high blood pressure which required a triple bypass surgery in 1995. In 2012, his health severely deteriorated and he was taken to the hospital named after him in Calgary where he died of natural causes at age 84 on September 13. His body lay in state from September 17 to 18 inside the main rotunda of the Alberta Legislature Building. The national and provincial flags were flown at half-mast throughout the province. After lying in state, Lougheed's body travelled back to Calgary in a motorcade from Edmonton that followed a procession through the city, passing places of significance to Lougheed. A state memorial was held on September 21, 2012, at the Southern Alberta Jubilee Auditorium in Calgary.

In response to his death, Prime Minister Stephen Harper described Lougheed as "one of the most remarkable Canadians of his generation." Alberta Premier Alison Redford cut short her trip to Asia in order to attend his funeral. Alberta's opposition leader Danielle Smith, former prime minister Jean Chrétien (who was the Minister of Justice during negotiations to patriate the Canadian constitution), federal opposition leader Thomas Mulcair and Calgary mayor Naheed Nenshi issued statements condoling his death. Former prime minister Joe Clark wrote a special commentary in The Globe and Mail praising Lougheed.

== Legacy ==
Jeanne and Peter Lougheed were often compared to Jackie and John F. Kennedy as well as Margaret and Pierre Trudeau. Time Magazine alluded to the "movie star" treatment the Lougheeds were greeted with across the province. Fil Fraser described Lougheed's time as Premier as the "Camelot for arts in Alberta".

As a politician, Lougheed travelled around Alberta to meet voters in their communities and impressed upon Progressive Conservative candidates the importance of door-to-door politics. When selecting candidates he looked for community leaders and ethnic diversity to ensure the Progressive Conservative Party reflected Alberta's increasing diversity. He lamented "professional politicians" and sought candidates with professional experience in multiple industries. Lougheed understood the power of television, and was one of the first major Canadian politicians to build an electoral and government strategy around it. He advocated for a decentralization of the Government of Alberta, moving offices outside of Edmonton and Calgary to newly constructed provincial buildings in rural parts of the province.

During his 14 years as Premier, Lougheed oversaw significant economy and cultural growth in Alberta, largely fueled by oil and gas royalty revenues. Lougheed's domestic policies saw the development of the Athabasca oil sands and the creation of the state-owned Alberta Energy Company to facilitate development of the oil and gas industry. Despite his party's Conservative label, Lougheed consistently made policies and investments that significantly expanded the government's role in the economy, impacted industries across the province, both in oil and gas and other areas of the free market, such as the purchase of Pacific Western Airlines. Lougheed implemented large-scale increases in provincial royalty rates for oil and gas production, and during the National Energy Program he reduced oil and gas production and paused two oil sands projects. These policies were unpopular with the Alberta oil and gas industry and conservatives in Alberta. The close ties of the state-owned Alberta Energy Company to the government gave critics the impression of an "unfair competitive advantage", and Lougheed's intervention in the free market through controlling oil and gas production worried his conservative base.

From an investment standpoint, Lougheed did not believe in corporate welfare, and instead sought equity stakes in businesses the province supported resulting in large holdings. In 1976, Lougheed created the Alberta Heritage Savings Trust Fund as a "rainy day" fund for oil and gas royalties. He also placed a significant emphasis on diversification of the Alberta economy away from oil and gas revenues. However, under Lougheed the government of Alberta continued to fund a significant portion of the provincial budget from non-renewable resource revenue, growing from 35 per cent of revenue in 1973 to 51 per cent in 1979.

His advocacy extended beyond provincial borders and was a driving force for Canadian premiers during the constitutional patriation debates of the late-1970s and early-1980s. He is credited for the amending formula and introduction of the notwithstanding clause in the Constitution Act, 1982. However, former University of Calgary professor Roger Gibbins notes that Alberta remained in a defensive position during constitutional debates due to the National Energy Program and Trudeau's willingness to unilaterally patriate the constitution, in that sense Gibbins viewed Lougheed's contribution to constitutional debates as maintaining the status quo, which was not in the best interest of Western Canada.

Former prime minister Brian Mulroney described Lougheed as a "great leader for Alberta...and for the entire nation". Biographer Alan Tupper described Lougheed as exemplifying Alberta's best qualities, and as the "principal architect of modern Alberta". Former prime minister and justice minister during the constitutional debates Jean Chrétien described Lougheed as "he was tough, but he was a gentleman". Former Calgary Mayor Naheed Nenshi described Lougheed's legacy as "I have never known an Alberta or a Canadian that did not benefit from his legacy. We owe him so much: our strong industries, our magnetic cities, our sense of identity within Canada".

When trying to explain how populism not conservatism should be the ideology that best described Alberta politics, Jen Gerson viewed Lougheed as one of Alberta's favourite premiers and that Alberta NDP Premier Rachel Notley should be seen as Lougheed's heir. Future Premier Danielle Smith wrote that she also viewed Notley as the inheritor to Lougheed's legacy.

In 2012, Policy Options a magazine published by the public policy think tank Institute for Research on Public Policy brought together a jury of 30 prominent Canadians which named Peter Lougheed the best Canadian premier in the past 40 years (1972–2012). Lougheed was ranked first amongst 21 of the 30 jurors.

== Honours ==
In 1971 Lougheed was named honorary chief "Thunderbird" by the Cree Nation, and later was named honorary chief "Crop Eared Wolf" by the Blood Nation.

Lougheed was styled "The Honourable" for the duration of his membership in the Executive Council of Alberta from 1971 to 1986. When he was appointed a privy councillor (postnominal: "PC") on April 17, 1982, the style "The Honourable" was extended for life. In 1986, he was named a Companion of the Order of Canada (postnominal: "CC"), and in 1989 he was named to the Alberta Order of Excellence (postnominal: "AOE").

In 1986 the University of Alberta established the Peter Lougheed Scholarship, and later established other scholarships in health sciences, law and arts in his name. In 2001 he was inducted into the Canadian Medical Hall of Fame which established the Peter Lougheed/CIHR Scholarship. Harvard University awarded Lougheed the university's Distinguished Alumni Award in 1986.

The Kananaskis Provincial Park was renamed Peter Lougheed Provincial Park in 1986 after Lougheed's retirement as Premier. The new Calgary General Hospital constructed in 1988 was named the Peter Lougheed Centre, Lougheed received his end-of-life care and died in the hospital. Other sites named in honour of Lougheed include Edmonton's Peter Lougheed Multicultural Village, the Jeanne and Peter Lougheed Building at Banff Centre for Arts and Creativity, a residence hall at the University of Alberta, and Lougheed Avenue in Heisler, Alberta. After his death proposals were made to rename Calgary International Airport in his honour.

== Electoral record ==
=== As party leader ===
1982 Alberta provincial election
Party	Party leader	# of candidates	Seats			Popular vote		
Party	Party leader	# of candidates	1979	1982	% Change	#	%	% Change
Progressive Conservative	Peter Lougheed	79	74	75	+1.4%	588,485	62.28%	+4.88%
New Democrats	Grant Notley	79	1	2	+100%	177,166	18.75%	+3.00%
Independent		34	-	2		36,590	3.87%	+3.10%
Western Canada Concept	Gordon Kesler	78	-	-	-	111,131	11.76%	-
Liberal	Nicholas Taylor	29	-	-	-	17,074	1.81%	−4.35%
Social Credit		23	4	-	−100%	7,843	0.83%	−19.04%
Alberta Reform Movement	Tom Sindlinger	14	-	-	-	6,258	0.66%	*
Communist		8	-	-	-	389	0.04%	−0.01%
Total		344	79	79	-	944,936	100%	
1979 Alberta provincial election
Party	Party leader	# of candidates	Seats			Popular vote		
Party	Party leader	# of candidates	1975	1979	% Change	#	%	% Change
Progressive Conservative	Peter Lougheed	79	69	74	+7.2%	408,097	57.40%	−5.25%
Social Credit	Robert Curtis Clark	79	4	4	-	141,284	19.87%	+1.70%
New Democrats	Grant Notley	79	1	1	-	111,984	15.75%	+2.81%
Liberal	Nicholas Taylor	78	-	-	-	43,792	6.16%	+1.18%
Independent		8	-	-	-	3,430	0.48%	+0.37%
Independent Conservative		3	-	-	-	1,613	0.23%	+0.05%
Independent Christian		1	-	-	-	403	0.06%	-
Communist		7	-	-	-	357	0.05%	−0.08%
Total		334	75	79	+5.3%	710,963	100%	
1975 Alberta provincial election
Party	Party leader	# of candidates	Seats			Popular vote		
Party	Party leader	# of candidates	1971	1975	% Change	#	%	% Change
Progressive Conservative	Peter Lougheed	75	49	69	+40.8%	369,764	62.65%	+16.25%
Social Credit	Werner Schmidt	70	25	4	−84.0%	107,211	18.17%	−22.93%
New Democrats	Grant Notley	75	1	1	0%	76,360	12.94%	+1.52%
Independent Social Credit		1	*	1	100%	4,428	0.75%	*
Liberal	Nicholas Taylor	46	-	-	-	29,424	4.98%	+3.97%
Independent Progressive Conservative		3	-	-	-	1,059	0.18%	-
Communist		14	-	-	-	768	0.13%	-
Independent		4	-	-		625	0.11%	+1.06%
Independent Liberal		2	-	-	-	416	0.07%	-
Constitutional Socialist	Mike Uhryn	3	-	-	-	115	0.02%	-
Total		293	75	75	-	590,200	100%	
1971 Alberta provincial election
Party	Party leader	# of candidates	Seats			Popular vote		
Party	Party leader	# of candidates	1967	1971	% Change	#	%	% Change
Progressive Conservative	Peter Lougheed	75	6	49	+717%	296,934	46.40%	+20.40%
Social Credit	Harry Strom	75	55	25	−54.5%	262,953	41.10%	−3.5%
New Democrats	Grant Notley	70	-	1		73,038	11.42%	−4.56%
Liberal	Bob Russell	20	3	-	−100%	6,475	1.01%	−9.80%
Independent		3	1	-	−100%	462	0.07%	−1.31%
Total		243	65	75	+15.4%	639,862	100%	
1967 Alberta provincial election
Party	Party leader	# of candidates	Seats			Popular vote		
Party	Party leader	# of candidates	1963	1967	% Change	#	%	% Change
Social Credit	Ernest C. Manning	65	60	55	−8.3%	222,270	44.60%	−10.21%
Progressive Conservative	Peter Lougheed	47	-	6		129,544	26.00%	+13.29%
Liberal	Michael Maccagno	45	2	3	+50.0%	53,847	10.81%	−8.95%
Independent		7	-	1		6,916	1.38%	+0.40%
New Democrats	Neil Reimer	65	-	-	-	79,610	15.98%	+6.53%
Coalition		2	1	-	−100%	3,654	0.73%	+0.19%
Independent Progressive Conservative		2	-	-	-	1,118	0.22%	-
Liberal/Progressive Conservative		1	-	-	-	699	0.14%	−0.14%
Independent Social Credit		2	-	-	-	693	0.14%	−0.65%
Total		236	63	65	+3.2%	498,351	100%	

=== As MLA ===
1982 Alberta general election results (Calgary West)			
Affiliation	Candidate	Votes	%
Progressive Conservative	Peter Lougheed	11,668	78.8%
NDP	Ed Smith	1,175	7.9%
WCC	Bruce Roper	1,106	7.5%
Liberal	Barb Scott	598	4.0%
Social Credit	Leonard Petterson	251	1.7%
1979 Alberta general election results (Calgary West)			
Affiliation	Candidate	Votes	%
Progressive Conservative	Peter Lougheed	7,825	72.9%
Social Credit	Frank Cottingham	930	8.7%
Liberal	Barb Scott	874	8.1%
NDP	Ed Smith	699	6.5%
Independent Christian	Jacob Binnema	406	3.8%
1975 Alberta general election results (Calgary West)			
Affiliation	Candidate	Votes	%
Progressive Conservative	Peter Lougheed	8,983	78.6%
Social Credit	Charles Grey	1,213	10.6%
NDP	Neil Ellison	674	5.9%
Liberal	Steve Shaw	564	4.9%
1971 Alberta general election results (Calgary West)			
Affiliation	Candidate	Votes	%
Progressive Conservative	Peter Lougheed	7,049	55.2%
Social Credit	Charles Grey	4,319	33.8%
NDP	Joe Yanchula	1,066	8.3%
Liberal	Brian Stevenson	333	2.6%
1967 Alberta general election results (Calgary West)			
Affiliation	Candidate	Votes	%
Progressive Conservative	Peter Lougheed	8,548	61.7%
Social Credit	Donald S. Fleming	4,028	29.1%
NDP	Allan Early	868	6.3%
Liberal	Natalie Chapman	402	2.9%

== Bibliography ==
=== Biographies of Lougheed ===
- Fraser, Fil (2003). Alberta's Camelot: Culture and the Arts in the Lougheed Years. Lone Pine Publishing. ISBN 978-1-55105-393-6.
- Hustak, Alan (1979). Peter Lougheed: A Biography. McClelland & Stewart. ISBN 978-0-7710-4299-7.
- Perry, Sandra E.; Craig, Jessica J. (2006). The Mantle of Leadership: Premiers of the Northwest Territories and Alberta. Edmonton, Alberta: Legislative Assembly of Alberta. ISBN 0-9689217-2-8.
- Tupper, Allan (2004). "Peter Lougheed". In Bradford J. Rennie (ed.). Alberta Premiers of the Twentieth Century. Regina, Saskatchewan: Canadian Plains Research Center, University of Regina. ISBN 978-0-88977-151-2.
- Wood, David G. (1985). The Lougheed legacy. Toronto: Key Porter Books. ISBN 978-0-919493-48-3. OCLC 910363674.

=== Books ===
- Behiels, Michael D. (2005). "Premiere Peter Lougheed, Alberta and the Transformation of Constitutionalism in Canada, 1971-1985". In Connors, Richard; Law, John M. (eds.). Forging Alberta's Constitutional Framework. Edmonton: University of Alberta Press. ISBN 978-0-88864-457-2.
- Elton, David (1976). "Alberta". In Saywell, John (ed.). Canadian Annual Review of Politics and Public Affairs, 1975. Toronto: University of Toronto Press. ISBN 978-1-4426-7189-8.
- Elton, David (1981). "Alberta". In Byers, R.B. (ed.). Canadian Annual Review of Politics and Public Affairs, 1979. Toronto: University of Toronto Press. ISBN 978-1-4426-7193-5.
- Engelmann, Frederick C. (1992). "The Legislature". In Tupper, Allan; Gibbins, Roger (eds.). Government and Politics in Alberta. Edmonton: University of Alberta Press. ISBN 978-0-88864-243-1.
- McCormick, Peter (1984). "Alberta". In Byers, R.B. (ed.). Canadian Annual Review of Politics and Public Affairs, 1982. Toronto: University of Toronto Press. ISBN 978-1-4426-7196-6.
- Tupper, Allan; Pratt, Larry; Urquhart, Ian (1992). "The Role of Government". In Tupper, Allan; Gibbins, Roger (eds.). Government and Politics in Alberta. Edmonton: University of Alberta Press. ISBN 978-0-88864-243-1.

Academic offices
Preceded by Agnes Benidickson	Chancellor of Queen's University; 1996–2002	Succeeded by A. Charles Baillie
