= Danny Dalla-Longa =

Canadian politician and businessman

Member of the Legislative Assembly of Alberta for Calgary West
- In office 1993–1997
- Preceded by: Elaine McCoy
- Succeeded by: Karen Kryczka

Personal details
- Born: November 6, 1953 (age 72) Medicine Hat, Alberta
- Party: Alberta Liberal Party

Danny Dalla-Longa (born November 6, 1953) is a politician and businessman from Alberta, Canada.

Dalla-Longa was elected to the Legislative Assembly of Alberta as a Liberal member for Calgary-West in 1993. This was seen as a major upset as Calgary West was the former stronghold of Premier Peter Lougheed. Dalla-Longa served for one term in the assembly and did not run again.

Dalla-Longa is an officer of a company in Calgary called i3 Capital Partners Inc., a merchant bank focused on the energy and technology industries.
