= Death spiral =

Death spiral may refer to:

- Aircraft flight:
  - Graveyard spiral
  - Spiral dive
- Death spiral (figure skating), an element of pair skating
- Death spiral (insurance), an insurance plan whose costs are rapidly increasing
- Death spiral financing
- Ant mill, a behavioral phenomenon in ants
- Death Spiral, a 1989 novel by John Ballem
- "Death Spiral", a song by Dirty Projectors from Dirty Projectors
- Amazing Spider-Man/Venom: Death Spiral, a 2026 Marvel Comics storyline
