= Kryczka =

Kryczka is a family name of Polish origin. Notable people with the surname include:

- Joe Kryczka (1935–1991), lawyer, judge, and president of the Canadian Amateur Hockey Association
- Karen Kryczka (born 1940), Canadian politician
- Kelly Kryczka (born 1961), Canadian Olympian
