= Elaine McCoy =

Canadian politician (1946–2020)

The Honourable Elaine McCoy QC
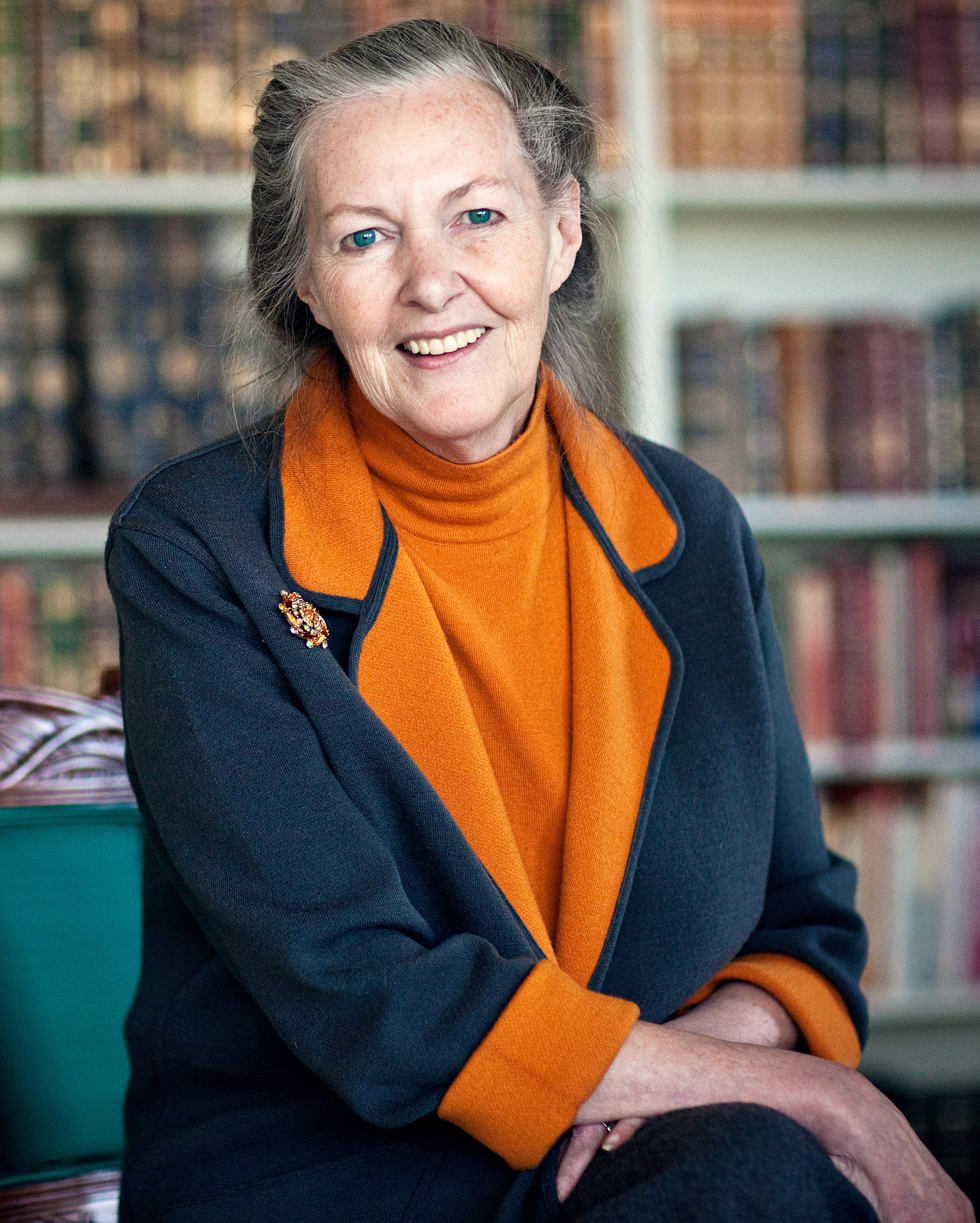
- McCoy in 2010

Facilitator of the Independent Senators Group
- In office September 27, 2016 – September 25, 2017
- Deputy: None (Note: McCoy had no deputy during her term, as the deputy facilitator is elected by the caucus. McCoy was the first facilitator on an interim basis, and was not elected. Thus, no deputy facilitator was in office.)
- Preceded by: Position created
- Succeeded by: Yuen Pau Woo

Canadian Senator from Alberta
- In office March 24, 2005 – December 29, 2020
- Nominated by: Paul Martin
- Appointed by: Adrienne Clarkson

MLA for Calgary-West
- In office 1986–1993
- Preceded by: Peter Lougheed
- Succeeded by: Danny Dalla-Longa

Personal details
- Born: March 7, 1946 Brandon, Manitoba, Canada
- Died: December 29, 2020 (aged 74) Ottawa, Ontario, Canada
- Party: Canadian Senators Group (2019–2020)
- Other political affiliations: Independent Senators Group (2016–2019); Independent Progressive Conservative (2013–2016); Progressive Conservative (2005–2013); Alberta PC (until 1993)
- Education: University of Alberta

Elaine Jean McCoy QC (March 7, 1946 – December 29, 2020) was a Canadian politician from Alberta. She served as a Calgary MLA from 1986 to 1993. She was a member of the Senate of Canada.

In 2005, McCoy was appointed to the Senate. She designated herself a member of the Progressive Conservative Party despite its dissolution two years prior; following the retirement of Lowell Murray in 2011, she was the last remaining member of the Senate to sit as a Progressive Conservative. In 2016, she joined the Independent Senators Group (ISG) and served as its initial interim facilitator. In 2019, she left the ISG and joined the Canadian Senators Group.

McCoy was previously the Alberta PC MLA for Calgary-West from 1986 to 1993. During this time, she served as Minister of Consumer and Corporate Affairs, Minister responsible for Women's Issues and Minister of Labour under Premier Don Getty.

== Early life and education ==
Born in Brandon, Manitoba, Elaine Jean McCoy was the daughter of John Frederick and Jean Stewart (Hope) McCoy. She was an alumna of the University of Alberta, and held an LLB (1969) and Bachelor of Arts in English (1968).

Before entering provincial politics, McCoy worked as senior legal counsel for the Alberta Energy and Utilities Board and as counsel for TransAlta Utilities Corporation.

== Alberta politics ==
From 1986 to 1993, McCoy was the Alberta Progressive Conservative Party Member of the Legislative Assembly (MLA) for Calgary-West in the Legislative Assembly of Alberta. She succeeded Peter Lougheed in the riding, whom she had previously campaigned with and who had suggested she run in the constituency after he retired. McCoy expected to be a backbencher, as she was not well-connected within the party, and was surprised to be immediately appointed to the Executive Council of Alberta. She was named Minister of Consumer and Corporate Affairs and Minister responsible for Women's Issues by Premier Don Getty. As Minister, McCoy was responsible for creating the Insurance Council of Alberta, restructuring the Alberta Securities Commission, and for introducing a variety of new policies to protect consumers. She was also involved in developing foreign credentials recognition for immigrant professionals.

In 1989, McCoy was appointed Alberta's Minister of Labour and Minister responsible for Human Rights, in which portfolio she was responsible for Alberta's personnel administration office. She set up an Alberta Human Rights Commission inquiry into the Aryan Nations which was responsible for investigating and eliminating supremacist activity in the province. McCoy also shed light on violence against women and spearheaded the Lake Louise Declaration, which was Alberta's first action plan designed to fight violence against women, and the first all-Canada declaration on the subject.

=== Leadership candidate ===
When Getty retired in 1992, McCoy ran in the 1992 Progressive Conservative Association of Alberta leadership election to succeed him. She placed 8th in a field of nine and was eliminated on the first ballot; the contest was won by Ralph Klein. Klein did not appoint her to his cabinet, and she did not run for re-election in 1993.

=== Right-to-work joint review committee ===
In 1995, McCoy was asked by the government of Alberta to chair a joint review committee (JRC) into whether or not right-to-work (RTW) legislation would be beneficial to the province. The committee was formed following a motion debated on March, and announced in April 1995. It delivered its unanimous report in November of the same year. It received 225 written submissions from Albertans on the issue. The JRC ultimately did not recommend RTW legislation for Alberta, as it found no evidence of economic advantage to it.

== Senate of Canada ==
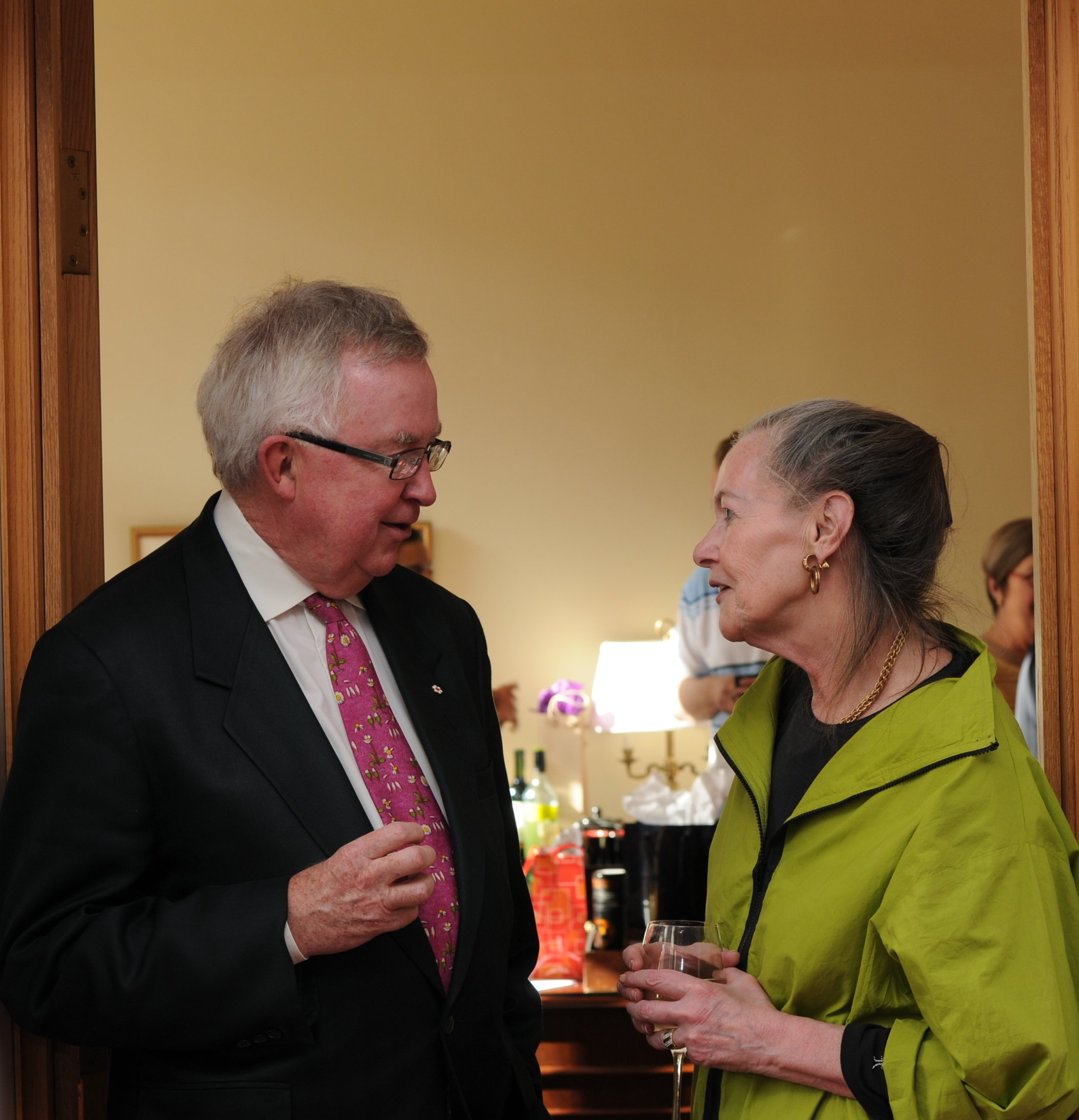
McCoy speaks with former prime minister Joe Clark, March 2010.

McCoy was appointed to the Senate by Governor General Adrienne Clarkson, on the recommendation of Prime Minister Paul Martin, on March 24, 2005. She represented Alberta as a member of the Canadian Senators Group.

Initially a member of the Progressive Conservative caucus, a rump caucus of Tory senators who had refused to join the new Conservative Party of Canada in 2003, McCoy was ultimately the last Progressive Conservative in the chamber following the retirement of Senator Lowell Murray in 2011. She changed her designation to Independent PC in 2013 and then to non-affiliated in 2016, following the decision by the government of Justin Trudeau to make the Senate a non-partisan institution and appoint independent senators. In September 2016, she and 14 other non-affiliated senators formed the Independent Senators Group to advocate for the rights of non-affiliated senators as the upper house was still organized around partisan lines resulting in non-affiliated senators being underrepresented on committees and not receiving the funding given to party caucuses. McCoy was elected facilitator of the new group for the 2016–2017 parliamentary term. In December 2016, the Senate agreed to recognize the ISG and granted it funding, and also agreed that non-affiliated senators would be appointed to Senate committees in numbers proportionate to their numbers in the Senate.

On November 4, 2019, she joined the Canadian Senators Group.

After being appointed to the Senate, McCoy was an influential voice for the role of the individual senator, for Senate reform, for an inclusive federation and the role of Alberta in Canada. McCoy was one of the first members of the Senate of Canada to blog and tweet on her experiences in Ottawa and the political issues of the day. A feature article on McCoy in Maclean's called her a "symbol of defiance" as one of only two Progressive Conservative senators then remaining in federal politics and someone who "defines herself as socially progressive and fiscally conservative".

== Personal life ==
McCoy was married to Miles Patterson, a lawyer. She died on December 29, 2020, in Ottawa.

== Sources ==
- Cavanaugh, Catherine Anne; Warne, Randi Ruth, eds. (1993). Standing on New Ground: Women in Alberta. The University of Alberta Press. ISBN 0-88864-258-X. OCLC 243593549.
- Harder, Lois (2003). "Feminists and Family Values: The Crisis of Alberta's Welfare State". State of Struggle: Feminism and Politics in Alberta. The University of Alberta Press. pp. 79–118. ISBN 0-88864-401-9. OCLC 52071270.
- Trimble, Linda (1992). "The Politics of Gender". In Gibbins, Roger; Tupper, Allan (eds.). Government and Politics in Alberta. The University of Alberta Press. pp. 219–246. ISBN 0-88864-243-1. OCLC 243592310.
