= Melvin H. Smith =

Canadian attorney and civil servant

Melvin H. Smith, Q.C. (1934–2000) spent 31 years in the public service of British Columbia.

Born in Winnipeg, Manitoba in 1934, Mel Smith graduated from UBC with Commerce and Law degrees. In 1960, Smith was called to the Bar of British Columbia. He became a B.C. public servant and served for 31 years. He was the ranking official on constitutional law and reform issues for four successive provincial administrations from 1967 to 1987. A key player in the patriation of the Constitution in 1981, Smith was also a leader in the "NO" campaign on the Charlottetown Accord.

After retiring from government in 1991, he spent his time as a consultant, commentator and columnist for BC Report, and lecturer at Trinity Western University. He authored the best-selling book "Our Home or Native Land?", among many other publications and essays. Mel believed Canadians are on the threshold of achieving greater opportunity for a stronger and more balanced Canada, and felt that Canadians, as a nation, must recommit themselves to the transcendent values of hard work, loyalty, honesty, and integrity.

== The Mel Smith Collection ==
This Special Collection, housed in Trinity Western University's Archives, comprises a comprehensive set of professional and personal papers chronicling the events of the most crucial period of federal-provincial relations—1967 to 1992. The collection includes documents, briefing papers, position papers, correspondence, books, news clippings, photographs, and memorabilia relating to the events of these years viewed from a B.C. perspective. The collection is available to students and researchers from all institutions.

== The Mel Smith Scholarship Award ==
An endowment fund has been established to grant an annual scholarship to a TWU student of exceptional academic ability, majoring in Canadian History or Political Science. Recipients of this award prepare a research paper on a constitutional issue, which is then published in the Archives.

== The Mel Smith Lectures ==
Every year since 1999, TWU has hosted the Mel Smith Lecture & Scholarship Presentation. Lecture topics range from citizen engagement to aboriginal self-government.

Speakers have included the following:

- Rafe Mair (1999) - "The Role of BC in Constitutional Reform"
- Preston Manning, CC (2000) - "Thinking Big About the Future"
- Gordon Gibson, OBC (2001) - "B.C. and Canada: The Old Ways and New"
- Nick Loenen (2002) - "Should Canada Consider Proportional Representation"
- Ted Morton (2003) - "Our Turn: A New Course for the West"
- John Weston, MP (2004) - "Why Never Give In"
- Ken Carty (2005) - "Turning Voters Into Citizens"
- David Elton (2006) - "Citizen Engagement: Democracy At Its Best"
- Chuck Strahl, PC, MP (2007) - "Logging, Politics, Life: It Matters Where You Stand"
- Ralph Klein (2008) - "Government and Politics: Ralph's Way"
- Deborah Grey, OC (2009) - "Power, Parliament, and Preston Manning: My Life as a Reformer"
- D. Martyn Brown, (2014)- "Visions versus Pipelines: Beyond the Effort"
