= Donald S. Fleming =

Canadian politician

Donald Stuart Fleming (March 23, 1913 – September 12, 2001) was a politician from Alberta, Canada.

== Political career ==
Fleming was elected as a Social Credit Party of Alberta member to the Legislative Assembly of Alberta in the 1959 Alberta general election for Calgary West. He barely held onto his seat in 1963, holding off Progressive Conservative leader Milt Harradence by just over a thousand votes. He sought a third term in 1967 and was resoundingly defeated by Harradence's successor as Tory leader, Peter Lougheed, who would go on to become Alberta's premier.

During his years in the Legislature Donald Fleming served as a back bench member in the Social Credit government. He participated on the Select Standing Committees on Agriculture, Colonization, Immigration and Education; Railways, Telephones and Irrigation; Public Affairs; Private Bills; and Public Accounts.

Legislative Assembly of Alberta
Preceded by New District	MLA Calgary West; 1959-1967	Succeeded by Peter Lougheed
