= Calgary-West =

Provincial electoral district in Alberta, Canada

Coordinates: 51.03°N 114.19°W

Alberta electoral district
- Calgary-West within the City of Calgary, 2017 boundaries

Provincial electoral district
- Legislature: Legislative Assembly of Alberta
MLA
Mike Ellis
United Conservative
- District created: 1957
- First contested: 1959
- Last contested: 2023

Calgary-West (formerly styled Calgary West from 1957 to 1971) is a provincial electoral district for the Legislative Assembly of Alberta, Canada. The electoral riding of Calgary West is one of the two original Calgary ridings of the seven that has survived from the 1959 Redistribution of the Calgary riding. The other riding is Calgary-Glenmore.

This riding covers the central west portion of Calgary and contains the neighbourhoods of Cougar Ridge, Coach Hill, Strathcona, Signal Hill, Discovery Ridge, Springbank Hill, Strathcona, Aspen Woods, West Springs, Springhaven, Montreaux, Spring Hill, Richmond Hill, Wentworth, Patterson, Glamorgan, Glenbrook and Christie Park.

== History ==
The electoral district was first created in 1957 and used in 1959 as part of the original boundary redistribution for Calgary after the Social Credit government decided to return to the first past the post method of voting.

The 2010 boundary redistribution saw significant changes to the riding. It lost all land east of Sarcee Trail to Calgary-Currie and all land north of Bow Trail to Calgary-Bow.

=== Boundary history ===
24 Calgary-West 2003 boundaries
Bordering districts
North	East	West	South
Calgary-Bow	Calgary-Bow Calgary-Currie and Calgary-Elbow	Foothills-Rocky View	Foothills-Rocky View
riding map goes here			
Legal description from the Statutes of Alberta 2003, Electoral Divisions Act.
Starting at the intersection of the west Calgary city boundary and the north boundary of the south half of Sec. 28, Twp. 24, Rge. 2 W5; then 1. east along the north boundary of the south half of Secs. 28, 27 and 26 in Twp. 24, Rge. 2 W5 to its intersection with Sarcee Trail NW; 2. southeast and south along Sarcee Trail SW to the westerly extension of 26 Avenue SW; 3. east along 26 Avenue SW to 43 Street SW; 4. south along 43 Street SW to 28 Avenue SW; 5. east along 28 Avenue SW to 40 Street SW; 6. north along 40 Street SW to 26 Avenue SW; 7. east along 26 Avenue SW to 37 Street SW; 8. south along 37 Street SW to Richmond Road SW; 9. southwest along Richmond Road SW to Sarcee Trail SW; 10. south along Sarcee Trail SW to the south Calgary city boundary (50 Avenue SW); 11. west and north along the Calgary city boundary to the starting point.
Note:

27 Calgary-West 2010 boundaries
Bordering districts
North	East	West	South
Calgary-Bow	Calgary-Currie and Calgary-Elbow	Chestermere-Rocky View	Chestermere-Rocky View
Note: Boundary descriptions were not used in the 2010 redistribution

=== Representation history ===
Calgary-West
Assembly	Years	Member	Party
Riding created from Calgary
14th	1959–1963	Donald Fleming	Social Credit
15th	1963–1967	Donald Fleming	Social Credit
16th	1967–1971	Peter Lougheed	Progressive Conservative
17th	1971–1975	Peter Lougheed	Progressive Conservative
18th	1975–1979	Peter Lougheed	Progressive Conservative
19th	1979–1982	Peter Lougheed	Progressive Conservative
20th	1982–1986	Peter Lougheed	Progressive Conservative
21st	1986–1989	Elaine McCoy	Progressive Conservative
22nd	1989–1993	Elaine McCoy	Progressive Conservative
23rd	1993–1997	Danny Dalla-Longa	Liberal
24th	1997–2001	Karen Kryczka	Progressive Conservative
25th	2001–2004	Karen Kryczka	Progressive Conservative
26th	2004–2008	Ron Liepert	Progressive Conservative
27th	2008–2012	Ron Liepert	Progressive Conservative
28th	2012–2014	Ken Hughes	Progressive Conservative
28th	2014–2015	Mike Ellis	Progressive Conservative
29th	2015–2017	Mike Ellis	Progressive Conservative
29th	2017–2019	Mike Ellis	United Conservative
30th	2019–2023	Mike Ellis	United Conservative
31st	2023–Present	Mike Ellis	United Conservative

The electoral district was first contested in the 1959 general election, and returned Social Credit candidate Donald Fleming. He won just over half of the popular vote in the new seat to pick it up for his party. Fleming faced a stiff challenge running in his second term in the 1963 election from Progressive Conservative leader Milt Harradence. Although Fleming won, he tallied under half the popular vote and only held off Harradence by just over a thousand votes.

The 1967 election would see Calgary West swing to the Progressive Conservatives. Fleming was defeated by Harradence's successor as PC leader, Peter Lougheed, who won the seat with a near landslide majority. He would go on to become Leader of the Opposition after he and five other candidates were elected.

Lougheed ran for his second term in the 1971 general election and won easily. His party would go on to form government in the province for the first time ever, and Lougheed became Premier. Lougheed would easily hold the district for the next three terms winning landslide majorities. He won his highest popular vote in the riding for the 1982 election as well as the highest number of seats in Alberta's history. Lougheed retired as Premier in 1985 and vacated Calgary-West on February 28, 1986.

The electoral district remained vacant for about two months until the 1986 general election which occurred in May of that year. The third representative for the riding was Progressive Conservative candidate Elaine McCoy who held the district losing almost half of the popular vote that Lougheed had won in 1982. She was appointed to the cabinet under Lougheed's successor, Don Getty.

McCoy won re-election in the 1989 election with a reduced majority. In 1992 she ran for leadership of the Progressive Conservative Association after Getty retired. She failed in her bid for leader losing to Ralph Klein. She did not run for a third term in 1993 and retired from the Legislature.

The 1993 election would see Calgary-West won by Liberal candidate Danny Dalla-Longa who won with a strong door knocking campaign over Progressive Conservative candidate Ron Leigh who had served as an Alderman on Calgary City Council. Dalla-Longa would only serve a single term in office retiring in 1997.

After Dalla-Longa retired the riding returned to the Progressive Conservative party selecting candidate Karen Kryczka in the 1997 election. She would be re-elected in 2001 winning a higher raw popular vote than Lougheed won in 1982. Kryczka retired at dissolution in 2004.

The most recent member of the legislature was Ron Liepert who won his first term in the 2004 election. He would be appointed to the cabinet in 2006 under the government of Ed Stelmach. He won his second term in office in 2008 with a larger majority.

== Legislative election results ==
=== 1959 ===
1959 Alberta general election
Party	Candidate	Votes	%	±%
Social Credit	Donald S. Fleming	5,060	50.14%	–
Progressive Conservative	Roy Victor Deyell	3,392	33.61%	–
Liberal	Ted Duncan	1,397	13.84%	–
Co-operative Commonwealth	Ken Tory	242	2.40%	–
Total		10,091	–	–
Rejected, spoiled and declined		32	–	–
Eligible electors / Turnout		18,231	55.53%	–
Social Credit pickup new district.				
Source(s) Source: "Calgary-West Official Results 1959 Alberta general election". Alberta Heritage Community Foundation.

=== 1963 ===
1963 Alberta general election
Party	Candidate	Votes	%	±%
Social Credit	Donald S. Fleming	5,183	42.80%	-7.34%
Progressive Conservative	Asa Milton Harradence	4,109	33.93%	0.32%
Liberal	Ted Duncan	2,250	18.58%	4.74%
New Democratic	Jack D. Peters	568	4.69%	2.29%
Total		12,110	–	–
Rejected, spoiled and declined		12	–	–
Eligible electors / Turnout		22,540	53.78%	-1.75%
Social Credit hold		Swing		-3.83%
Source(s) Source: "Calgary-West Official Results 1963 Alberta general election". Alberta Heritage Community Foundation.

=== 1967 ===
1967 Alberta general election
Party	Candidate	Votes	%	±%
Progressive Conservative	Peter Lougheed	8,548	61.74%	27.81%
Social Credit	Donald S. Fleming	4,028	29.09%	-13.71%
New Democratic	Allan M. Early	868	6.27%	1.58%
Liberal	Natalie Chapman	402	2.90%	-15.68%
Total		13,846	–	–
Rejected, spoiled and declined		70	–	–
Eligible electors / Turnout		19,986	69.63%	15.85%
Progressive Conservative gain from Social Credit		Swing		11.89%
Source(s) Source: "Calgary-West Official Results 1967 Alberta general election". Alberta Heritage Community Foundation.

=== 1971 ===
1971 Alberta general election
Party	Candidate	Votes	%	±%
Progressive Conservative	Peter Lougheed	7,049	55.21%	-6.52%
Social Credit	Charles Grey	4,319	33.83%	4.74%
New Democratic	Joe Yanchula	1,066	8.35%	2.08%
Liberal	Brian Stevenson	333	2.61%	-0.30%
Total		12,767	–	–
Rejected, spoiled and declined		58	–	–
Eligible electors / Turnout		16,848	76.12%	6.49%
Progressive Conservative hold		Swing		-5.63%
Source(s) Source: "Calgary-West Official Results 1971 Alberta general election". Alberta Heritage Community Foundation.

=== 1975 ===
1975 Alberta general election
Party	Candidate	Votes	%	±%
Progressive Conservative	Peter Lougheed	8,983	78.56%	23.35%
Social Credit	Charles Gray	1,213	10.61%	-23.22%
New Democratic	Neil Ellison	674	5.89%	-2.45%
Liberal	Steve Shaw	564	4.93%	2.32%
Total		11,434	–	–
Rejected, spoiled and declined		42	–	–
Eligible electors / Turnout		17,624	65.12%	-11.01%
Progressive Conservative hold		Swing		23.29%
Source(s) Source: "Calgary-West Official Results 1975 Alberta general election". Alberta Heritage Community Foundation.

=== 1979 ===
1979 Alberta general election
Party	Candidate	Votes	%	±%
Progressive Conservative	Peter Lougheed	7,825	72.90%	-5.66%
Social Credit	Frank F. Cottingham	930	8.66%	-1.94%
Liberal	Barbara Ann Scott	874	8.14%	3.21%
New Democratic	Ed Smith	699	6.51%	0.62%
Independent Christian	Jacob H. Binnema	406	3.78%	–
Total		10,734	–	–
Rejected, spoiled and declined		68	–	–
Eligible electors / Turnout		17,796	60.70%	-4.42%
Progressive Conservative hold		Swing		-1.86%
Source(s) Source: "Calgary-West Official Results 1979 Alberta general election". Alberta Heritage Community Foundation.

=== 1982 ===
1982 Alberta general election
Party	Candidate	Votes	%	±%
Progressive Conservative	Peter Lougheed	11,668	78.85%	5.95%
New Democratic	Ed Smith	1,175	7.94%	1.43%
Western Canada Concept	Bruce Roper	1,106	7.47%	–
Liberal	Barbara Ann Scott	598	4.04%	-4.10%
Social Credit	Leonard Petterson	251	1.70%	-6.97%
Total		14,798	–	–
Rejected, spoiled and declined		82	–	–
Eligible electors / Turnout		22,774	65.34%	4.64%
Progressive Conservative hold		Swing		3.34%
Source(s) Source: "Calgary-West Official Results 1982 Alberta general election". Alberta Heritage Community Foundation.

=== 1986 ===
1986 Alberta general election
Party	Candidate	Votes	%	±%
Progressive Conservative	Elaine McCoy	6,846	64.65%	-14.20%
New Democratic	Joseph Yanchula	2,354	22.23%	14.29%
Liberal	George Francom	1,390	13.13%	9.08%
Total		10,590	–	–
Rejected, spoiled and declined		52	–	–
Eligible electors / Turnout		24,129	44.10%	-21.23%
Progressive Conservative hold		Swing		-14.25%
Source(s) Source: "Calgary-West Official Results 1986 Alberta general election". Alberta Heritage Community Foundation.

=== 1989 ===
1989 Alberta general election
Party	Candidate	Votes	%	±%
Progressive Conservative	Elaine McCoy	6,133	46.30%	-18.35%
Liberal	Bernie Myers	4,550	34.35%	21.22%
New Democratic	Joseph Yanchula	2,564	19.36%	-2.87%
Total		13,247	–	–
Rejected, spoiled and declined		50	–	–
Eligible electors / Turnout		25,551	52.04%	7.94%
Progressive Conservative hold		Swing		-15.23%
Source(s) Source: "Calgary-West Official Results 1989 Alberta general election". Alberta Heritage Community Foundation.

=== 1993 ===
1993 Alberta general election
Party	Candidate	Votes	%	±%
Liberal	Danny Dalla-Longa	6,927	47.04%	12.69%
Progressive Conservative	Ron Leigh	6,532	44.36%	-1.94%
New Democratic	Nabil (Ben) Hantes	584	3.97%	-15.39%
Social Credit	Sharon Whitehead	548	3.72%	–
Natural Law	Phil Morin	135	0.92%	–
Total		14,726	–	–
Rejected, spoiled and declined		23	–	–
Eligible electors / Turnout		22,959	64.24%	12.20%
Liberal gain from Progressive Conservative		Swing		7.32%
Source(s) Source: "Calgary-West Official Results 1993 Alberta general election". Alberta Heritage Community Foundation.

=== 1997 ===
1997 Alberta general election
Party	Candidate	Votes	%	±%
Progressive Conservative	Karen Kryczka	8,478	56.23%	11.87%
Liberal	Paul Adams	4,995	33.13%	-13.91%
Social Credit	Craig Chandler	1,070	7.10%	3.38%
New Democratic	Rudy Rogers	534	3.54%	-0.42%
Total		15,077	–	–
Rejected, spoiled and declined		12	17	1
Eligible electors / Turnout		26,946	56.00%	-8.24%
Progressive Conservative gain from Liberal		Swing		10.21%
Source(s) Source: "Calgary-West Official Results 1997 Alberta general election". Alberta Heritage Community Foundation.

=== 2001 ===
2001 Alberta general election
Party	Candidate	Votes	%	±%
Progressive Conservative	Karen Kryczka	12,866	73.15%	16.92%
Liberal	Lorne B. Neudorf	3,459	19.67%	-13.46%
New Democratic	Greg Klassen	1,263	7.18%	3.64%
Total		17,588	–	–
Rejected, spoiled and declined		53	10	4
Eligible electors / Turnout		32,302	54.63%	-1.38%
Progressive Conservative hold		Swing		15.19%
Source(s) Source: "Calgary-West Official Results 2001 Alberta general election". Alberta Heritage Community Foundation.

=== 2004 ===
2004 Alberta general election
Party	Candidate	Votes	%	±%
Progressive Conservative	Ron Liepert	6,969	52.08%	-21.07%
Liberal	Derek Smith	4,284	32.02%	12.35%
Alberta Alliance	John Keyes	989	7.39%	–
Green	James S. Kohut	731	5.46%	–
New Democratic	Chantelle Dubois	408	3.05%	-4.13%
Total		13,381	–	–
Rejected, spoiled and declined		40	27	3
Eligible electors / Turnout		31,736	42.30%	-12.33%
Progressive Conservative hold		Swing		-16.71%
Source(s) Source: "00 - Calgary-West, 2004 Alberta general election". officialresults.elections.ab.ca. Elections Alberta.

=== 2008 ===
2008 Alberta general election
Party	Candidate	Votes	%	±%
Progressive Conservative	Ron Liepert	8,428	47.97%	-4.11%
Liberal	Beth Gignac	5,693	32.41%	0.39%
Wildrose	Bob Babcock	2,273	12.94%	–
Green	James S. Kohut	773	4.40%	-1.06%
New Democratic	Chantelle Dubois	401	2.28%	-0.77%
Total		17,568	–	–
Rejected, spoiled and declined		31	25	2
Eligible electors / Turnout		40,146	43.84%	1.54%
Progressive Conservative hold		Swing		-2.25%
Source(s) Source: "24 - Calgary-West, 2008 Alberta general election". officialresults.elections.ab.ca. Elections Alberta.

=== 2012 ===
2012 Alberta general election
Party	Candidate	Votes	%	±%
Progressive Conservative	Ken Hughes	8,160	49.93%	1.96%
Wildrose	Andrew Constantinidis	6,094	37.29%	24.35%
Liberal	Wilson McCutchan	1,219	7.46%	-24.95%
New Democratic	Mary I. Nokleby	499	3.05%	0.77%
Evergreen	Karen Huggins	212	1.30%	–
Alberta Party	Pam Crosby	158	0.97%	–
Total		16,342	–	–
Rejected, spoiled and declined		114	48	3
Eligible electors / Turnout		27,975	58.83%	14.99%
Progressive Conservative hold		Swing		-1.46%
Source(s) Source: "27 - Calgary-West, 2012 Alberta general election". officialresults.elections.ab.ca. Elections Alberta.

=== 2014 by-election ===
Alberta provincial by-election, October 27, 2014 Resignation of Ken Hughes on September 26, 2014
Party	Candidate	Votes	%	±%
Progressive Conservative	Mike Ellis	4,836	44.29	−5.56
Wildrose	Sheila Taylor	4,530	41.58	+4.25
Liberal	David Khan	927	8.51	+1.05
New Democratic	Brian Malkinson	337	3.09	+0.08
Alberta Party	Troy Millington	264	2.42	+1.45
Total		10,894	—	—
Rejected, spoiled and declined		17	7	1
Eligible electors / turnout		30,541	35.73	—
Progressive Conservative hold		Swing		−
Source(s) Alberta. Chief Electoral Officer (2015). Report on the October 27, 2014 By-elections in: Calgary-Elbow, Calgary-Foothills, Calgary-West, Edmonton-Whitemud (PDF) (Report). Edmonton: Legislative Assembly of Alberta; Chief Electoral Officer. ISBN 978-098653678-6.

=== 2015 ===
2015 Alberta general election
Party	Candidate	Votes	%	±%
Progressive Conservative	Mike Ellis	8,312	46.79%	2.50%
New Democratic	Mizanur Rahman	4,940	27.81%	24.72%
Wildrose	Gerard Lucyshyn	4,512	25.40%	-16.18%
Total		17,764	–	–
Rejected, spoiled and declined		75	20	22
Eligible electors / turnout		31,604	56.51%	20.78%
Progressive Conservative hold		Swing		
Source(s) Source: "27 - Calgary-West, 2015 Alberta general election". officialresults.elections.ab.ca. Elections Alberta.

=== 2019 ===
2019 Alberta general election
Party	Candidate	Votes	%	±%
United Conservative	Mike Ellis	14,974	66.11	-6.08
New Democratic	Gulshan Akter	5,768	25.47	-2.34
Alberta Party	Frank Penkala	1,610	7.11	–
Liberal	Yasna Oluic-Kovacevic	298	1.32	–
Total		22,651	–	–
Rejected, spoiled and declined		65	40	6
Eligible electors / turnout		32,570	69.76%	13.25%
United Conservative hold		Swing		
Source(s) Source: "26 - Calgary-West, 2019 Alberta general election". officialresults.elections.ab.ca. Elections Alberta.

=== 2023 ===
2023 Alberta general election
Party	Candidate	Votes	%	±%
United Conservative	Mike Ellis	12,793	56.67	-9.44
New Democratic	Joan Chand'oiseau	9,468	41.94	+16.48
Green	Jason McKee	313	1.39	–
Total		22,574	99.15	–
Rejected and declined		193	0.85	
Turnout		22,767	66.25	
Eligible voters		34,363		
United Conservative hold		Swing		-12.96
Source(s) Source: Elections Alberta

== Senate nominee election results ==
=== 2004 ===
2004 Senate nominee election results: Calgary-West				Turnout 43.63%	
Affiliation	Candidate	Votes	% votes	% ballots	Rank
Progressive Conservative	Bert Brown	5,834	17.30%	52.79%	1
Progressive Conservative	Jim Silye	5,745	17.03%	51.99%	5
Progressive Conservative	Betty Unger	4,792	14.21%	43.36%	2
Progressive Conservative	David Usherwood	3,446	10.22%	31.18%	6
Independent	Link Byfield	3,176	9.42%	28.74%	4
Progressive Conservative	Cliff Breitkreuz	3,095	9.18%	28.01%	3
Independent	Tom Sindlinger	2,306	6.84%	20.87%	9
Alberta Alliance	Vance Gough	1,954	5.79%	17.68%	8
Alberta Alliance	Michael Roth	1,782	5.28%	16.13%	7
Alberta Alliance	Gary Horan	1,603	4.73%	14.51%	10
Total votes		33,733	100%		
Total ballots		11,051	3.05 votes per ballot'		
Rejected, spoiled and declined		2,795			

Voters had the option of selecting four candidates on the ballot

== Student vote results ==
=== 2004 ===
Participating schools
Calgary Academy
Brentwood Elementary
Glenbrook School
Menno Simons Christian School
Webber Academy

On November 19, 2004, a student vote was conducted at participating Alberta schools to parallel the 2004 Alberta general election results. The vote was designed to educate students and simulate the electoral process for persons who have not yet reached the legal majority. The vote was conducted in 80 of the 83 provincial electoral districts with students voting for actual election candidates. Schools with a large student body that reside in another electoral district had the option to vote for candidates outside of the electoral district then where they were physically located.

2004 Alberta student vote results
Affiliation	Candidate	Votes	%
Progressive Conservative	Ron Liepert	158	44.13%
Green	James Kohut	98	27.37%
Liberal	Derek Smith	52	14.53%
NDP	Chantelle Dubois	27	7.54%
Alberta Alliance	John Keyes	23	6.43%
Total		358	100%
Rejected, spoiled and declined		31	

=== 2012 ===
2012 Alberta student vote results
Affiliation	Candidate	Votes	%
Progressive Conservative			%
Wildrose	Andrew Constantinidis		
Liberal	Wilson Mccutchan		%
NDP	Mary Nokleby		%
Total			100%

== See also ==
- List of Alberta provincial electoral districts
- Canadian provincial electoral districts
