= Milt Harradence =

Canadian politician (1922–2008)

Asa Milton "Milt" Harradence (April 23, 1922 – February 28, 2008) was a Canadian criminal lawyer, pilot, politician and judge of the Court of Appeal of Alberta.

== Early life ==
Harradence was born in Blaine Lake, Saskatchewan and earned his law degree at the University of Saskatchewan. His aggressive nature saw him become middleweight boxing champion of the University of Saskatchewan. His brother, Clyne Harradence, graduated in law at the same time and was in partnership with John Diefenbaker before Diefenbaker became Prime Minister.

== Military service & aviation ==
From 1941 to 1943, during World War II, he served in the Royal Canadian Air Force (RCAF). It was during his service that he was wrongfully "cashiered" for performing aerobatics with a Bristol Bolingbroke bomber-trainer, "broken" from the RCAF and sent to Alaska as a member of the Canadian Army. After the war he overturned his "cashiering," had his flying status and honourable record renewed and moved to Calgary, Alberta to practise law.

Harradence flew with 403 City of Calgary Squadron, RCAF for a number of years. In 1960 Lynn Garrison, also a pilot with 403 Squadron, obtained the contract to ferry 75 P-51 Mustang aircraft, retired from RCAF service, to their new owners in New York City. Harradence would take time off from his law practise to accompany Garrison on the trips. Flying without radios, most of the time, they navigated by following the CPR railroad tracks eastward. Some of the flights were very exciting. He and Garrison acquired two Mustangs as part of their compensation and registered them as CF-LOR and CF-LOQ, the first of their type registered in Canada. Harradence loved to do low-level aerobatics and participated in many airshows across Canada and the United States. He and Garrison had a long-term relationship with the founders of the Confederate Air Force in Texas. Milt would trade his Mustang for a DeHavilland Vampire jet, obtained from New York by Garrison. This would be traded for Garrison's Canadair F-86 which Harradence flew as CF-AMH, for a short time, before retiring from the aviation game in 1967.

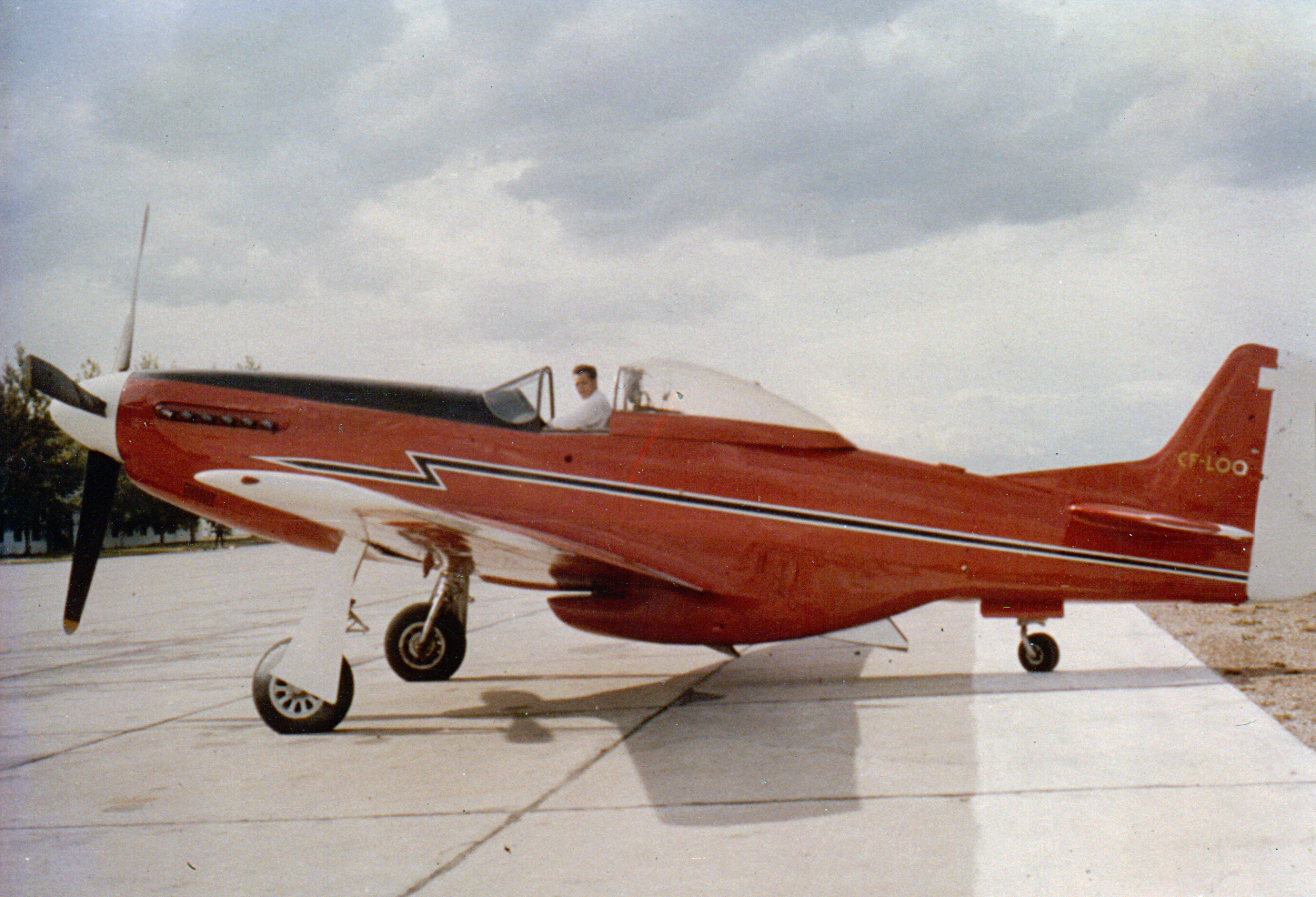
Milt Harradence in his ex-RCAF Mustang

While ferrying surplus Mustangs from the old RCAF Station Macleod, Harradence and Garrison noted a number of Lancaster bombers heading into the melting pot. Garrison purchased Lancaster FM-136 in 1960 and ferried it to Calgary where, with the help of Milt Harradence and Arthur R. Smith DFC, MP, created the Lancaster Memorial Fund. The Lancaster is a permanent display in Calgary as a memorial to those who served with the British Commonwealth Air Training Plan, during World War Two. Harradence and Smith received their pilot training under this scheme. Smith flew Lancasters.

== Politics ==
With Lynn Garrison as his campaign manager, Harradence was elected to Calgary City Council in 1957 serving as an alderman for a term. He was re-elected for a second term but resigned after a short period. Harradence was leader of the Alberta Progressive Conservative Party from 1962 to 1964. A flamboyant Calgary defence lawyer and war veteran, he defeated Ernest Watkins, the party's sole member of the legislature, at the 1962 Progressive Conservative leadership convention. He received media attention during 1963 Alberta general election by flying his own red P-51 Mustang across the province while campaigning. Harradence was defeated in Calgary West by Donald S. Fleming of the Social Credit Party of Alberta and the party lost half of its popular vote and was shut out of the legislature with the loss of Watkins' seat.

Harradence's vigorous campaigning created a base upon which Peter Lougheed would develop the Progressive Conservative Party to the point where it defeated the Social Credit Party. Lougheed became Premier.

== Legal career ==
Harradence retired from politics and returned to his legal practise as a criminal defence lawyer. The target of a number of death threats due to his legal work, he was one of the few people in the country granted a permit to carry a concealed weapon.

In the 1970s, he was asked by the province to investigate allegations of brutality by prison guards at the Calgary Correctional Institute. While he cleared the guards his report criticized the prison system.

The Pierre Trudeau government's handling of the 1973 energy crisis and his treatment of Western Canada created a reason for the Committee for Western Independence in early 1975. Milt Harradence was involved in the Independent Alberta Association aimed at breaking Alberta's oil industry away from Ottawa's control. This created a great deal of embarrassment for Trudeau. Harradence's cousin, Jack Horner, was a cabinet minister in the Trudeau government.

In spite of this, one of Trudeau's final acts before leaving office, saw Harradence appointed to the Alberta Court of Appeal in 1979 where he sat as a judge until his retirement in 1997. He died from cancer on February 28, 2008.

== Other ==
His service was recognized when he was appointed an honorary colonel of the 416 Tactical Fighter Squadron in Cold Lake.

His colleague, C.D. Evans, wrote a book on Harradence: Milt Harradence: The Western Flair. Canadian Magazine said of Harradence: "When he strides into a courtroom, Calgary’s Milt Harradence goes to war."

The Criminal Trial Lawyers' Association in Alberta periodically awards the Harradence Prize in his honour to the experienced counsel whose actions most reflect the characteristics of Harradence
