= Governor General's Special Warrants =

Governor General's Special Warrants (French: Mandats spéciaux du gouverneur général) are documents authorizing Canada's President of the Treasury Board to spend money appropriated by Parliament. The Governor General may also issue a special warrant which allows the government to spend funds without an appropriation from Parliament. A special warrant may only be issued when money is "urgently needed" after Parliament has been dissolved, there is no other appropriation available to make a payment and until sixty days after the dates set for the return of election writs.

All special warrants must be published in the Canada Gazette within 30 days after they were issued. In addition, the government must present a list of all special warrants that were issued while the Parliament was not in session due to election to the House of Commons within 15 days after the election.

Until 1997, when an act sponsored by Peter Milliken received royal assent, special warrants were available whenever Parliament was not is session, including adjournments and prorogations. Milliken had introduced similar bills since 1989 in response to the use of special warrants in 1988. Parliament convened in December 1988 and adjourned quickly without considering appropriations. During the adjournment and subsequent prorogation, the government resorted to special warrants to fund operations. The issue was raised in both chambers after Parliament returned.
