= Karen Kryczka =

Canadian politician (born 1940)

Member of the Legislative Assembly of Alberta for Calgary West
- In office March 11, 1997 – November 22, 2004
- Preceded by: Danny Dalla-Longa
- Succeeded by: Ron Liepert

Personal details
- Born: November 24, 1940 (age 85) Edmonton, Alberta
- Party: Progressive Conservative Association of Alberta

Karen Pearce Kryczka (born November 24, 1940) is a former politician from Alberta, Canada.

Kryczka was first elected to the Legislative Assembly of Alberta in the 1997 Alberta general election. She served as a back bench member for the Progressive Conservatives. In 2001 she was re-elected for a second term. She retired from her seat in 2004 when she decided not to run again.

In the Legislature she was the chair of the Seniors Advisory Council for Alberta.

She was a supporter of Jim Dinning's campaign in the 2006 Alberta Progressive Conservative leadership election.

== Family ==
Kryczka is the mother of Canadian Olympian Kelly Kryczka, and was married to Adam Kryczka, the brother of Joe Kryczka.
