= David Elton =

David Elton CM
- Occupations: Political scientist, academic, foundation executive
- Years active: 1980–present
- Employer: University of Lethbridge
- Known for: President of Canada West Foundation (CWF); Senate reform advocacy
- Title: Professor Emeritus
- Awards: Member of the Order of Canada (2014)

David Elton CM is Professor Emeritus of political science at the University of Lethbridge, and past President of Max Bell Foundation.

Elton taught at the University of Lethbridge for over thirty years. In 1980 Dr. Elton began working as President of the Canada West Foundation (CWF), and served as President until 1997. During Elton's tenure, CWF research topics included institutional reform and citizens' engagement. In 1997 Elton was appointed as President of the Max Bell Foundation, a charitable granting philanthropic organization.

Elton was the keynote speaker at the 2006 Mel Smith Lecture at Trinity Western University.

In June 2014, Elton was named a Member of the Order of Canada for dedicating his academic life to political reform, most especially senate reform.
