= John Ballem =

Canadian writer and lawyer (1925–2010)

- Born: February 2, 1925; New Glasgow, Nova Scotia, Canada
- Died: 9 January 2010 (aged 84)
- Occupations: Novelist, Poet, Lawyer
- Writing career
- Period: 1970s to 2010
- Genres: Mystery, legal writing
- Website: www.johnballem.ca

John Bishop Ballem (1925–2010) was a Canadian murder mystery/thriller novelist. While best known for his novels about the oil industry and private law, Ballem was also a naval air force pilot, assistant professor, specialist in the oil industry and private law lawyer. He was an acknowledged legal authority on oil and gas and winner of the Petroleum Law Foundation Prize in 1973. He was a member of the Crime Writers of Canada, the Probus Club of Calgary and the Air Crew Association of Alberta: Southern Alberta Branch. In 2009, the Law Society of Alberta and the Canadian Bar Association of Alberta awarded John the Distinguished Service Award for Legal Scholarship. He was also a Calgary Herald world travels reporter and visited many exotic locations such as both poles. Ballem's most important and well known work is the internationally recognized authoritative text The Oil and Gas Lease in Canada, a standard legal reference that went to four editions, the final being 2008.

== Education and career ==
When he was 19, he joined the Royal Navy Fleet Air Arm and participated in WWII (1944–1945). After the war was over he returned to Nova Scotia to attend Dalhousie University and completed the following degrees: B.A., 1946; M.A. 1948 & LL.B. 1949. Ballem also attended Harvard Law School and completed a post graduate LL.M. in 1950. After completing university, he took on a job at the University of British Columbia as an assistant professor of law for 2 years (1950–1952). From there, he moved on to the oil industry in Alberta where he worked for over a decade. Following his career in the oil industry, Ballem moved to Calgary in 1962 and entered energy law practice.

== Alberta oil industry identity ==
Although he wrote mystery novels set in exotic locations, such as the Caribbean and the Northwest Territories, Ballem's best known are his murder mysteries set in Alberta. During his career in the oil industry, he would write his famous Oilpatch Empire Trilogy which consisted of Oilpatch Empire (1985), Death Spiral (1989) and The Barons (1991). The trilogy would highlight the turbulent world of oil, business, power and sex in the Canadian oil industry and was considered Ballem's greatest work.

Then there is The Oil Patch Quartet, an omnibus of four novels which included his first novel The Devil's Lighter. The novel was praised by former Calgary Herald books editor Kenneth McGoogan as "an invaluable picture of the Alberta oil industry from the halcyon 1950s through the tumultuous 1980s." The book sold out within a few days of its publication.

== Works ==
=== Novels ===
- The Devil's Lighter (1973)
- The Dirty Scenario (1974)
- The Judas Conspiracy (1976) (reissued as Alberta Alone) (1981)
- The Moon Pool (1978)
- Sacrifice Play (1981)
- The Marigot Run (1984)
- Oilpatch Empire (1985)
- Death Spiral (1989)
- The Barons (1991)
- Manchineel (2000)
- Murder as a Fine Art (2002)
- The Oil Patch Quartet (omnibus of four novels) (2005)
- A Victim of Convenience (2006)
- Murder on the Bow (2010)

=== Textbooks ===
- The Oil and Gas Lease in Canada (4th ed.) (1973/2008)

=== Poetry ===
- Lovers & Friends, The Natural World

=== Articles ===
- Journey to the End of the World (Calgary Herald) (2005)
- Schmoozing with the Emperors (Calgary Herald) (2007)
- The Stone Giants of Easter Island (Calgary Herald) (2007)
- Dubai nature reserve is an oasis (Calgary Herald) (2008)
- On the trail of Shackleton in Antarctica (Calgary Herald) (2009)
- Waiting for the Ilyushin ‘window’ (2009)
