= Holger Herwig =

German-born Canadian historian (born 1941)

Holger H. Herwig
- Born: September 25, 1941 (age 84); Hamburg, Germany
- Education: University of British Columbia (BA), State University of New York at Stony Brook (MA, Ph.D.)
- Occupation: Historian
- Writing career
- Subjects: World War I, German military and political history
- Notable works: Deadly Seas: The Destruction of the Bismarck, The First World War: Germany and Austria-Hungary, 1914-1918

Dr. Holger H. Herwig (born 1941) is a German-born Canadian historian and professor. He is the author of more than a dozen books, including the award-winning, The First World War: Germany and Austria-Hungary 1914-1918 and The Origins of World War I, written with Richard F. Hamilton. His research focuses on World War I and German military and political history. Dr. Herwig holds a dual position at the University of Calgary as Professor of History and as Canada Research Chair in the Centre for Military and Strategic Studies.

== Early life and education ==
Herwig was born on September 25, 1941, in Hamburg, Germany.

In 1965, he earned his Bachelor of Arts degree from the University of British Columbia; in 1967, he obtained his Master's degree from the State University of New York at Stony Brook. In 1971, he received a Ph.D from Stony Brook.

== Career ==
From 1971 to 1989, Herwig taught at Vanderbilt University in Nashville, Tennessee. For one year, starting in 1985, he was visiting professor of Strategy at the Naval War College in Newport, Rhode Island.

In 1991, he was made Head of the Department of History at the University of Calgary. He held this position until 1996. Herwig was the Andrea and Charles Bronfman Distinguished Visiting professor of Judaic Studies at the College of William & Mary in Virginia in 1998.

He is a Fellow of the Royal Society of Canada.

Herwig has written and co-authored over a dozen books. Many of his books have been translated into Chinese, Czech, German, Polish, Portuguese, Serbs-Croatian, and Spanish. His research interests include German imperial history, German military history, German political and diplomatic history, and strategic studies. Military Diplomatic History and Europe fall under his areas of specialization.

With co-author, David Bercuson, Herwig wrote Deadly Seas: The Destruction of the Bismarck and One Christmas in Washington. The former book captured the attention of filmmaker James Cameron. Both Bercuson and Herwig produced Cameron's film for the Discovery Channel, James Cameron's Expedition: Bismarck. Herwig's other television projects in collaboration with Bercuson include Deadly Seas (1998), Murder in Normandy (1999), and Forced March to Freedom (2001).

== Publications ==
- The Demon of Geopolitics: How Karl Haushofer "Educated" Hitler and Hess (2016). ISBN 9781442261136
- Long Night of the Tankers: Hitler's War Against Caribbean Oil (2012), co-author with David J. Bercuson, ISBN 9781770870949
- The Marne, 1914: The Opening of World War I and the Battle that Changed the World (2011), ISBN 9780812978292
  - German: Marne 1914: eine Schlacht, die die Welt veränderte? Verlag Ferdinand Schöningh, 2016, ISBN 978-3-506-78195-6.
- War Memory and Popular Culture: Essays on Modes of Remembrance and Commemoration (2009), ISBN 9780786441419
- War Planning 1914 (2009), co-author with Richard F. Hamilton, ISBN 9780521110969
- World History of Warfare (2008), co-author with Christon Archer, John Ferris, and Tim Travers, ISBN 9780803219410
- One Christmas in Washington: The Secret Meeting Between Roosevelt and Churchill that Changed the World (2006), co-author with David J. Bercuson ISBN 9781585678464
- One Christmas in Washington: Roosevelt and Churchill Forge the Grand Alliance (2005), co-author with David J. Bercuson and Lloyd James, ISBN 9780786176281
- Decisions for War, 1914-1917 (2004), co-author with Richard F. Hamilton, ISBN 9780521545303
- The Origins of World War I (2003), co-author with Richard F. Hamilton, ISBN 9780521102186
- Cassell's World History of Warfare: The Global History of Warfare from Ancient Times to the Present Day (2003), ISBN 9780304363520
- The Destruction of the Bismarck (2001), co-author with David J. Bercuson, ISBN 9781585671922
- The Grand Illusion: The Prussianization of the Chilean Army (Studies in War, Society, and the Militar) (1999), co-author with William F. Sater Ph.D. MA AB, ISBN 9780803223936
- The Nazi Revolution (1999) co-author with Alan Mitchell and Theodore S. Hamerow, ISBN 9780395961476
- Deadly Seas: The Duel Between the St. Croix and the U305 in the Battle of the Atlantic (1998), ISBN 9780679309277
- The First World War: Germany and Austria-Hungary 1914-1918 (1997), ISBN 9780340573488
- The Outbreak of World War I (Problems in European Civilization Series (1996) ISBN 978-0669416923
- Hammer or Anvil? Modern Germany 1648-Present (Problems in European Civilization Series) (1993) ISBN 978-0669218770
- The Outbreak of World War I: Causes and Responsibilities (Problems in European Civilization Series) (1990) ISBN 9780669416923
- The Naval Strategy of the World War (Classics of Sea Power) (1989) (Translator) with Vice Admiral Wolfgang Wegener (Author), ISBN 9780870214899
- Luxury Fleet: The Imperial Germany Navy, 1888-1918 (1987), ISBN 9780948660030
- Germany's Vision of Empire in Venezuela, 1871-1914 (1986), ISBN 9780691054834
- Biographical Dictionary of World War I (1982), co-author with Neil M. Heyman ISBN 9780313213564
- Politics of Frustration: The United States in German Naval Planning, 1889-1941 (1976) ISBN 9780316358903
- German Naval Officer Corps (1973) ISBN 9780198225171
