= Canada West Foundation =

Canadian think tank

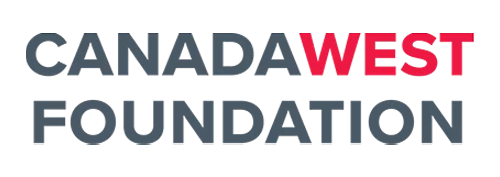
- Abbreviation: CWF
- Formation: December 31, 1970
- Type: Public policy think tank
- Headquarters: 110–134 11th Avenue SE
- Location: Calgary, Alberta
- Key people: Gary Mar (President & CEO); Bernie Morton (COO)
- Website: cwf.ca

The Canada West Foundation is an independent, non-partisan think tank based in Calgary, Alberta. It researches issues of concern in British Columbia, Alberta, Saskatchewan, and Manitoba and issues of national significance.

The foundation focuses on research and convening stakeholders to improve the prosperity, sustainability, and quality of life for the citizens of Canada's four western provinces and educate Canadians on Western Canadian contributions and aspirations.

== History ==
The Canada West Foundation was founded Dec. 31, 1970. Founding members include George Maxwell Bell (1912–1972), Arthur Child (1910–1996), (Note: Arthur Child, a staunch Reform Party supporter, was president and CEO for Burns Foods, brought it from the verge of bankruptcy to becoming the second-largest meat packer in the country. Child was the author of Economics and Politics in US Banking(1965).) Frederick C. Mannix (1913-present) and Honourable James A. Richardson.

The idea of a Western-focused thinking tank emerged during the One Prairie Province? A Question for Canada Conference, co-sponsored by the University of Lethbridge and the Lethbridge Herald in Lethbridge, Alberta, on May 10–13, 1970. Three papers were presented, including Strayer's paper on the Constitutional processes for a Prairie union. David Elton political science at the University of Lethbridge. published the conference proceedings in 1970 in the Lethbridge Herald.. Elton replaced Stan Roberts as president in 1980. He remained in that position until 1997 when he researched institutional reform and citizens' engagement. In this capacity, he acted as a witness in federal parliamentary committees on Finance, advocating for zero deficit and cut-off income limits for social welfare funding.

Stan Roberts was president of the Canada West Foundation from 1976 to 1980. In this capacity, he took a leading role in arguing for the West's position in Canada's constitutional debates.

In 1987 Francis Winspear, (Note: Francis G. Winspear (1903-1997) was a wealthy Edmonton financier and philanthropist who retired in Vancouver. Biography.) financed the Western Assembly on Canada's Economic and Political Future, (Patten 1997:40) organized by Preston Manning, Stan Roberts and Robert Muirheld and promoted by Ted Byfield, in Vancouver in 1987. The Canada West Foundation provided organizational support. It was at this assembly that the Reform Party of Canada was launched. (Note: Ellis worked with Tom Flanagan conducting research for the Reform Party which eventually led to his dissertation. Roger Gibbins recruited Ellis into the Ph.D. program in political science at the University of Calgary.) (Note: In a meteoric rise, the Reform Party became the Official Opposition to the Government of Canada within 10 years.) Winspear who was convinced that "mainline political parties no longer served the interest of Canadians," played a crucial role in the "founding and sustaining of the Reform Party of Canada." some within the Canada West Foundation believed that Roberts himself was partly sympathetic to separatism; he never became affiliated with the movement, but was forced to step down as CWF President in December 1980 after some controversial statements on the subject. According to journalist Norm Ovenden, under Roberts' presidency, by 1980, the Canada West Foundation had become a "powerhouse", a "prestige organization in just a decade." Ovenden credits Roberts with transforming a "low-key research organization" into a "well-known, widely respected pulse-takers of the Canadian west" in four years.

James K. Gray co-founder of Canadian Hunter Exploration, "one of Canada's largest and most successful natural gas companies." served as chair of the Canada West Foundation from 1994 to 2009 and as honorary chair.

Roger Gibbins, chairman and head of the political science department at the University of Calgary, served as president and CEO of the Canada West Foundation from 1999 until his retirement in June 2012. Gibbins was also a member of the Calgary School. (Note: Although the Calgary school is not an official organization and has no membership list, Roger Gibbins, David Bercuson, history professor and director of the university's Centre for Military and Strategic Studies, Barry F. Cooper, political science professor and fellow of the Canadian Defence and Foreign Affairs Institute, Tom Flanagan, professor of political science, senior fellow at the Fraser Institute and former adviser to Conservative Prime Minister Stephen Harper, Rainer Knopff, political science professor and Ted Morton were included in the group in a 2004 article in The Walrus.)

Dylan Jones was president and CEO of the Foundation from June 2012 to May 2016. Jones was former Deputy Minister to Saskatchewan Premier Brad Wall. Jones was named Deputy Minister of Western Economic Diversification, effective June 20, 2016.

Martha Hall Findlay served as president and CEO of the Foundation from September 2016 to December 2019. Findlay previously served as a Liberal Member of Parliament in the Toronto riding of Willowdale from 2008 to 2011. Findlay was named Chief Sustainability Officer for Suncor at the beginning of 2020.

== Funding ==
The Foundation is a registered educational charity funded through donations from charitable foundations, government, industry stakeholders and individual citizens. It also researches on behalf of clients. The Foundation has a reserve fund from which it draws annual income.

== Projects ==
=== Research centres ===
After a deep program review in 2012–13, the foundation focused on three critical research areas: human capital, natural resources and trade and investment. In 2013, the Foundation established three new research centres: the Natural Resources Centre, the Trade & Investment Centre and the Human Capital Centre.

Through its three centres, it looks for practical solutions to the challenges facing western Canada, including getting products to markets around the world, building a stronger, more versatile workforce, and finding ways to build public support for the region's key natural resource industries: forestry, agri-food, mining, and oil and natural gas.

=== Senate reform ===
In late 1978, CWF President, Stan Roberts, expressed interest in Francis Winspear's proposed constitutional reforms, which included Senate reform and the equal treatment of all provinces. During this period, Roberts made several speeches warning about the possibility of Western separatism. The four western provinces were vastly under-represented in the Senate. In 2012, Manitoba, Saskatchewan, Albert and British Columbia had only six seats each in the 105-seat Senate chamber. Nova Scotia, Prince Edward Island, New Brunswick and Newfoundland, despite much smaller populations than the West, had a combined 30 seats. Ontario and Quebec each had 24 seats. The CWF promotes a Triple-E Senate that would be equal, elected, and effective. However, with Prime Minister Harper in power, "the West no longer wants in because it is in. Indeed, it occupies the Prime Minister's Office."

=== Western Cities Project ===
In 2000, the CWF published a report entitled A Roof Over Our Heads: Affordable Housing and Urban Growth in Western Canada. In 2008, the research was updated in a publication entitled Affordable Housing and Homelessness Policy in Canada funded by the Alberta Real Estate Foundation, the Urban Development Institute Alberta and the cities of Vancouver, Calgary, Edmonton, Saskatoon and Regina.

=== Canada-Asia Energy Futures Task Force ===
In September 2011, the Asia Pacific Foundation of Canada (APF Canada) and the Canada West Foundation established the Canada-Asia Energy Futures Task Force with Kathleen (Kathy) E. Sendall, C.M., FCAE, (Note: Kathleen Sendall, is director CGG (Paris, France), Director of Enmax Corporation (Calgary, AB); Vice Chair, Alberta Innovates – Energy and Environment Solutions (Calgary, AB); Co-Chair, Canada West/Asia Pacific Foundation Task Force (Calgary, AB)." In 2013 Prime Minister Harper appointed her the Sustainable Development Advisory Council (SDAC) and the Advisory Council for Promoting Women on Boards. She advises "federal and provincial governments in the areas of climate change, carbon capture and storage, environmental legislation, and Arctic foreign policy, and recently chaired the Canadian Council of Academies Assessment Panel on the State of Industrial R&D in Canada. Previously, Ms. Sendall led Petro-Canada's North American Natural Gas Business Unit."Kathleen Sendall Biography) a former Governor and board chair of the Canadian Association of Petroleum Producers (CAPP) and Kevin G. Lynch, a Canadian economist and former Clerk of the Privy Council and Secretary to the Cabinet, Canada's most senior civil servant as co-chairs, to investigate a long-term Canada-Asia energy relationship. One of their recommendations was the creation of a public energy transportation corridor.

== See also ==
- Fraser Institute
- Calgary School
