= Global affairs (disambiguation) =

Global affairs usually refers to International relations, the scientific study of the international connections between states.

Global affairs or Global Affair may also refer to:

- A Global Affair, 1964 comedy film
- Global Affairs Canada, Canadian government department that manages Canada's diplomatic and consular relations

== See also ==
- Canadian Global Affairs Institute, an independent research institute based in Calgary
- Chicago Council on Global Affairs, a global affairs think tank
- Jackson Institute for Global Affairs, Yale University
- Munk School of Global Affairs, University of Toronto
