= Arthur Child =

Canadian businessman

- Born: 19 May 1910; Guildford, Surrey
- Died: 30 July 1996 (aged 86); Calgary, Alberta
- Education: Queen's University (BCom 1931); University of Toronto (MA 1960)
- Spouse(s): Olive Mabel Graham-Murray (m. 1933) Mary Gordon (m. 1955)
- Military career
- Allegiance: Canada
- Branch: Canadian Army
- Service years: 1928–29, 1943–45
- Rank: Lieutenant
- Unit: Royal Canadian Corps of Signals

Arthur James Edward Child OC (19 May 1910 – 30 July 1996) was a British-Canadian businessman who was a senior executive in the meat-packing industry. Child began his career in Toronto in 1931 with Canada Packers and rose to become a vice-president. In 1960 he left the company and became president of Intercontinental Packers in Saskatoon. Child moved to Calgary in 1966 where he became president of Burns Foods. In 1978, Burns became a private company with Child as a 25 per cent owner. Child and the other owners sold the company in 1985, however, in early 1986 he and a new partner reacquired four Burns divisions and organised them into a new business. Child was an 80 per cent owner of the new Burns company and at the time of his death was a multi-billionaire.

== Biography ==
=== Early life ===
Arthur Child was born on 19 May 1910 in Guildford, Surrey, to William Arthur Child and Helena Mary Wilson. He had two brothers, Robert and William. In 1913, the Childs moved to Canada and settled in Gananoque, where William worked at a steel foundry. Child graduated from Gananoque Secondary School in 1927, and that year entered Queen's University on scholarship. While a student at Queen's, Child was for three years the regimental sergeant-major of the university's Canadian Officers' Training Corps and was commissioned a second-lieutenant in the Royal Canadian Corps of Signals. He spent two summers during university at Camp Borden. Child was the sports editor for the Queen's Journal. He graduated bachelor of commerce in 1931.

=== Canada Packers ===
Child joined Canada Packers Limited in 1931 as a junior clerk. In 1938 he was appointed chief auditor. From 1943 to 1945, Child was recommissioned as reserve lieutenant in the Canadian Army. During the war, he spent time in Ottawa advising on food regulations, and devised the government's meat and gasoline rationing systems. In 1952, he was appointed vice-president of finance at Canada Packers. In 1956, Child took a leave of absence from the company to attend the Advanced Management Program at Harvard University. In the late 1950s, while continuing to work, he pursued a master's degree in economics at the University of Toronto. He wrote his thesis on the history of Canada Packers and graduated in 1960.

=== Intercontinental Packers ===
In 1960, Child resigned from Canada Packers and moved to Saskatoon, where he assumed the presidency of Intercontinental Packers Limited. During his tenure as president, Child tripled the size of the company. While in Saskatoon, for the 1964-65 academic year he served as an associate professor at the University of Saskatchewan.

=== Burns ===
==== Burns Foods Limited ====
Child left Saskatoon in 1966, at which time he moved to Calgary and became president of Burns Foods Limited. Child had been recruited by Montreal financier Reginald Howard Webster, who with Alec Hill of Toronto controlled the company. At the time, Burns was losing $350,000 per month. By 1969, the company had a net profit of $4 million. In an interview with the Calgary Herald in 1970, he said, "I wanted a simple profit and loss statement from each department weekly. I arranged to have the accounting revamped in one week, and I cut the front office staff from 80 to 30." In 1993, Child recounted how he turned the business around, saying, "when I arrived, it was a pretty loose company. I was used to just the opposite, a situation where orders were orders and you carried them out immediately – no 'ifs,' 'ands' or 'buts.' When I arrived, I laid down the law in several bulletins. Orders had to be obeyed promptly and no excuses were accepted for non-performance. Unacceptable performance could mean dismissal. Any challenge to my authority was met with immediate dismissal. There wasn't much of that after the first two or three instances. We became the most highly disciplined company in the industry."

By the late 1970s, Child owned 3.7 per cent of the company while Webster held 42 per cent. In 1978, Child and Webster took Burns private. After the buyout of the minority shareholders, Webster owned 61 per cent of Burns, Child owned 25 per cent, and a group of Burns officers owned the remaining 14 per cent.

==== Burns Foods (1985) Limited ====
In March 1985, the Burns ownership group sold the company to Union Enterprises of Toronto, the parent of Union Gas, for $125 million. Union's purchase of Burns intended as a "poison pill" to fend of a hostile takeover by Unicorp Canada Corp. Later in 1985, Unicorp took over Union nonetheless. In January 1986, Unicorp put Burns up for sale, as the food company was an uncomfortable fit in what was otherwise an energy concern. On Monday, 5 May 1986, it was announced that Child and executive vice-president Ronald Jackson would buy four of the seven Burns divisions. Child would hold an 80 per cent share, while Jackson would hold 20 per cent. Child executed the purchase through his company Ajex Investments Limited. The four divisions Child and Jackson acquired were Burns Meats Limited of Winnipeg, Scott National Co. Limited of Calgary, Food Service Limited of Montreal, and A. R. Clarke & Co. Limited of Toronto. The four companies were placed within a new parent company called Burns Foods (1985) Limited. The Burns divisions left with Unicorp were Palm Dairies, Canbra Foods, and Flavorland Foods, which were sold later to Peter Pocklington.

After Child's death, Ron Jackson explained how Child's army service informed his business practices. Jackson said, "he was probably the most disciplined and dedicated individual I've met. His entire business career was predicated on the regimentation of the military."

=== Other activities ===
In July 1933, Child married Olive Mabel Graham-Murray at Castlefield Avenue Baptist Church in Toronto. They divorced in 1948. On 10 December 1955, he remarried to Mary Gordon (1914–2004). In Calgary, the Childs built a house at 1320 Baldwin Crescent in the Bel-Aire neighbourhood. The house was demolished in 2017. Arthur and Mary had no children.

Child belonged to the Royal Canadian Military Institute, Royal Canadian Yacht Club, Harvard Club, University Club of Toronto, Mount Royal Club, Saint James's Club of Montreal, Club Saint-Denis, Vancouver Club, Royal Vancouver Yacht Club, Ranchmen's Club, and Calgary Golf & Country Club. He received honorary degrees from Queen's in 1983, the University of Toronto in 1984, and the University of Calgary in 1984. He was a fellow of the Royal Society of Arts and a member of the Canadian Meat Council, Institute of Internal Auditors, American Management Association, Beta Alpha Psi, and the International Institute for Strategic Studies. At various points in his career he served as a director of Nova Corporation, the Dominion Bridge Company, Canada Life Assurance, Imperial Trust, Montreal Trust, and Quebecair.

Child was the founding chairman in 1970 of the Canada West Foundation, a think tank based in Calgary. He remained the chairman until 1994. Although non-partisan, Child supported several politicians and advocated for Western Canada to have a greater role in the Canadian Federation. In 1990, he backed Stanley Waters in his bid for a federal senate seat. Child and Waters shared a common aspiration for Canada to have an elected federal senate.

In 1985, he was made an Officer of the Order of Canada, and in 1987 an officer of the Order of Good Hope in South Africa. Child served as the honorary colonel of 4 Wing, the Communications and Electronics Branch, and 5 Signal Regiment (South African Army). Child was a major donor to the 1000 Islands History Museum and Military Communications and Electronics Museum, both of which named buildings in his honour.

Child died in Calgary on 30 July 1996 at the age of 86. A memorial service was held on 9 August at HMCS Tecumseh.

=== Arthur J. E. Child Foundation ===
Child and his wife had no children, and after his death, the Arthur J. E. Child Foundation was endowed with his estate. The original trustees of the foundation were Burns co-owner Ron Jackson, Burns general counsel Lorne Jacobson, and Canada West Foundation president David Elton. In July 1997, the foundation gave $100,000 to the Alberta branch of Planned Parenthood, and $1 million to the Reform Party. In 2006 and 2007 foundation endowed a research chair in defence economics at the Centre for Military, Security and Strategic Studies of the University of Calgary. The chair was held by Dr Michael McKee.

In 2023, Alberta Health Services CEO Mauro Chies announced the new Calgary cancer centre would be named The Arthur J.E. Child Comprehensive Cancer Centre following a $50 million donation from his foundation. In October 2024, The Cancer Centre officially commenced operations, earning the distinction of being described as "one of the largest comprehensive cancer centres in the world." The facility features 160 inpatient rooms, 12 radiation vaults, and offers both inpatient and outpatient services.

== Works ==
- Internal Control against Fraud and Waste. Prentice-Hall, 1953. (With Bradford Cadmus)
- The Predecessor Companies of Canada Packers Limited: A Study of Entrepreneurial Achievement and Entrepreneurial Failure. University of Toronto, 1960. (Thesis)
- Economics and Politics in U.S. Banking and Other Essays. Midwest, 1965.
- The Meat Packing Industry in Canada, 1874–1927. Canadian Historical Association, 1974.
