= School of Public Policy (University of Calgary) =

Public policy school at the University of Calgary

- Type: Public policy school
- Established: 2008; 18 years ago
- Parent institution: University of Calgary
- Director: Martha Hall Findlay
- Management Board chair: Sandra Davidson
- Academic staff: 13 research faculty (2023)
- Location: 5th Floor, 906 8th Avenue SW, Calgary, Alberta, T2P 1H9, Canada; 51.04636°N 114.08215°W
- Website: spp.ucalgary.ca
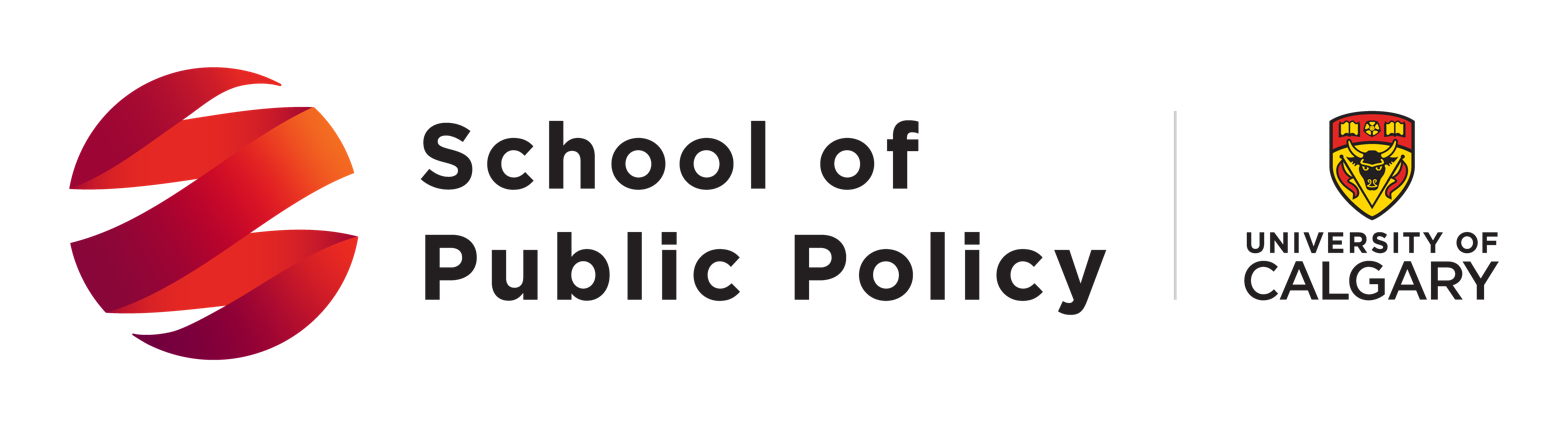

The School of Public Policy is an interdisciplinary teaching and research institution at the University of Calgary in Calgary, Alberta, Canada.

Founded in 2008, the School conducts public policy research and analysis and offers graduate degree programs, including the Master of Public Policy (MPP) and the Master of Science (MSc) in Sustainable Energy Development. It combines university-based teaching and research with policy analysis and public engagement characteristic of a think tank.

== History and evolution ==
The School was established in 2008 following plans for a School of Policy Studies at the University of Calgary announced in 2007 . Economist Jack Mintz, previously at the Rotman School of Management at the University of Toronto, became its founding director and held the James S. and Barbara A. Palmer Chair in Public Policy. The School was established with support from the Palmer family, including a $4 million donation from Calgary lawyer James S. Palmer.

Robert Mansell was appointed the School's first Academic Director in January 2009. The School was formally launched on 13 May 2009 at an event featuring a keynote address by former United States secretary of state Condoleezza Rice.

Early research-area leadership included David Bercuson as Director of International Policy, Ronald Kneebone as Director of Economic and Social Policy, Ken McKenzie as Director of Taxation and Economic Growth, and Michal Moore as Director of Energy and Environmental Policy, as recorded in the School's 2012 annual review. By 2016–17, Bev Dahlby was identified as the School's Research Director and Scientific Director for Fiscal and Economic Policy.

Since its inception, the School has drawn on research and teaching expertise from across the university and from outside organizations. Faculty members from several university faculties teach and conduct research at the School, including through secondment arrangements, while affiliated researchers and fellows contribute to its policy research and public events.

== Governance and funding ==
The School of Public Policy is an academic unit of the University of Calgary but is not a faculty. Faculty members present at the School are either seconded from other University of Calgary faculties or teach its courses without formal secondment.

The School reports to a Management Board chaired by the university's provost and composed of members of the university's executive and senior leadership. The board oversees management matters, including budgeting, hiring, programming and planning. The Management Board chair is Sandra Davidson, who became the university's provost in July 2024.

The School's founding director was Jack Mintz, followed by Robert Mansell as interim director from July 2015 to March 2016 and Pierre-Gerlier Forest as director from March 2016 to June 2021. Following Forest's departure, Peter MacKinnon and Jackie Sieppert served successively as interim directors. Martha Hall Findlay, a former Member of Parliament and former president and CEO of the Canada West Foundation, began a five-year term as director on 8 January 2024. The School's other executive and research leadership includes Associate Director Siu Ming Kwok and Research Director Myles Leslie.

As of 202, the School had 13 research faculty, seven managers and directors, 63 staff members (including support and research staff), and 75 fellows.

=== Funding ===
The School receives funding from multiple sources, including operating allocations from the University of Calgary, graduate tuition fees, research grants, philanthropic donations, and funding from government ministries and nonprofit organizations.

As of August 2019, the School's strategic outlook stated that its base funding allocation from the university then accounted for approximately 30–35% of annual funding, and projected a consolidated annual budget of C$9.8 million in the School's tenth year. In April 2023, the Government of Alberta announced C$9 million in funding over three years to support and expand the School's Master of Public Policy program.

== James S. Palmer Lecture Series ==
The James S. Palmer Lecture Series is a public lecture series named for James S. Palmer, a former chancellor of the University of Calgary. It brings invited speakers to the university to discuss public policy and related issues. Speakers have included writer Robert D. Kaplan in 2014 and journalist David Frum in 2017.

== Research ==
The School identifies five areas of research focus: Economic Growth & Prosperity, Energy & Natural Resources Policy, International Policy, Health & Social Policy, and Canadian Governance Policy.

Research areas
Area	Examples of topics
Economic Growth & Prosperity	Taxation, public finance, productivity, and interprovincial trade
Energy & Natural Resources Policy	Energy markets, natural resources, critical minerals, and energy transition
International Policy	International trade, Canada–United States relations, and Indo-Pacific relations
Health & Social Policy	Health services, social policy, and related public policy issues
Canadian Governance Policy	Canadian governance and intergovernmental relations

Research is overseen by an academic research committee composed of academics from multiple faculties and disciplines. According to its published procedures, research outputs are reviewed anonymously by two external experts, with revisions being subject to the approval of the School's Scientific and Research Directors.

=== Research output ===
The School publishes public policy papers written by affiliated and external researchers, including communiqués, briefing papers, research papers, and technical papers. It makes its research publications available online. As of 2022, it has produced more than 600 peer-reviewed publications since its establishment, with an additional 52 publications for the 2023–24 reporting year and 37 in its 2025 annual report.

== Education ==
The School reported 62 graduates across its degree programs in 2025.

=== Master of Public Policy ===
The School welcomed 40 students to the inaugural Master of Public Policy (MPP) cohort in September 2011. The MPP is a full-time, cohort-based program ordinarily completed over 12 months at the university's Downtown Campus. It combines coursework in public policy with an independent capstone research project supervised by a faculty member; projects may involve collaboration with government, business, or other organizations.

The School's 2017–18 annual report described a cohort of 50 students. School reporting suggests that 95% of MPP graduates were working in their field of study. Its 2025 annual report reported 499 MPP graduates since 2012.

=== Combined degree programs ===
The School offers a combined Master of Business Administration and Master of Public Policy degree (MBA/MPP) with the Haskayne School of Business, as well as a combined Juris Doctor and Master of Public Policy degree (JD/MPP) with the University of Calgary Faculty of Law.

=== Master of Science in Sustainable Energy Development ===
The School also offers an interdisciplinary Master of Science (MSc) in Sustainable Energy Development (SEDV). The program ordinarily takes 16 months and covers energy development through technical, economic, legal, business, environmental, and policy perspectives. It draws on teaching expertise from the Haskayne School of Business, Schulich School of Engineering, Faculty of Law, and the School of Architecture, Planning and Landscape, in addition to the School of Public Policy. In 2025 the School reported 531 graduates from the SEDV program since 1996, a period that predates the School's establishment.

== Rankings ==
The School has appeared repeatedly among the top 25% of public policy schools in the IDEAS/RePEc rankings in economics and finance, including in 2020, 2022, 2023, 2025, and 2026. In September 2026, the School ranked 45th among 259 institutions listed as public policy schools.

== Political criticism ==
In a 2015 commentary on the University of Calgary, journalist David Climenhaga characterized the School as a publicly financed political lobbying organization and criticized what he viewed as its links to conservative political networks and corporate donors.
