= New Dundee, Ontario =

New Dundee
- Unincorporated community
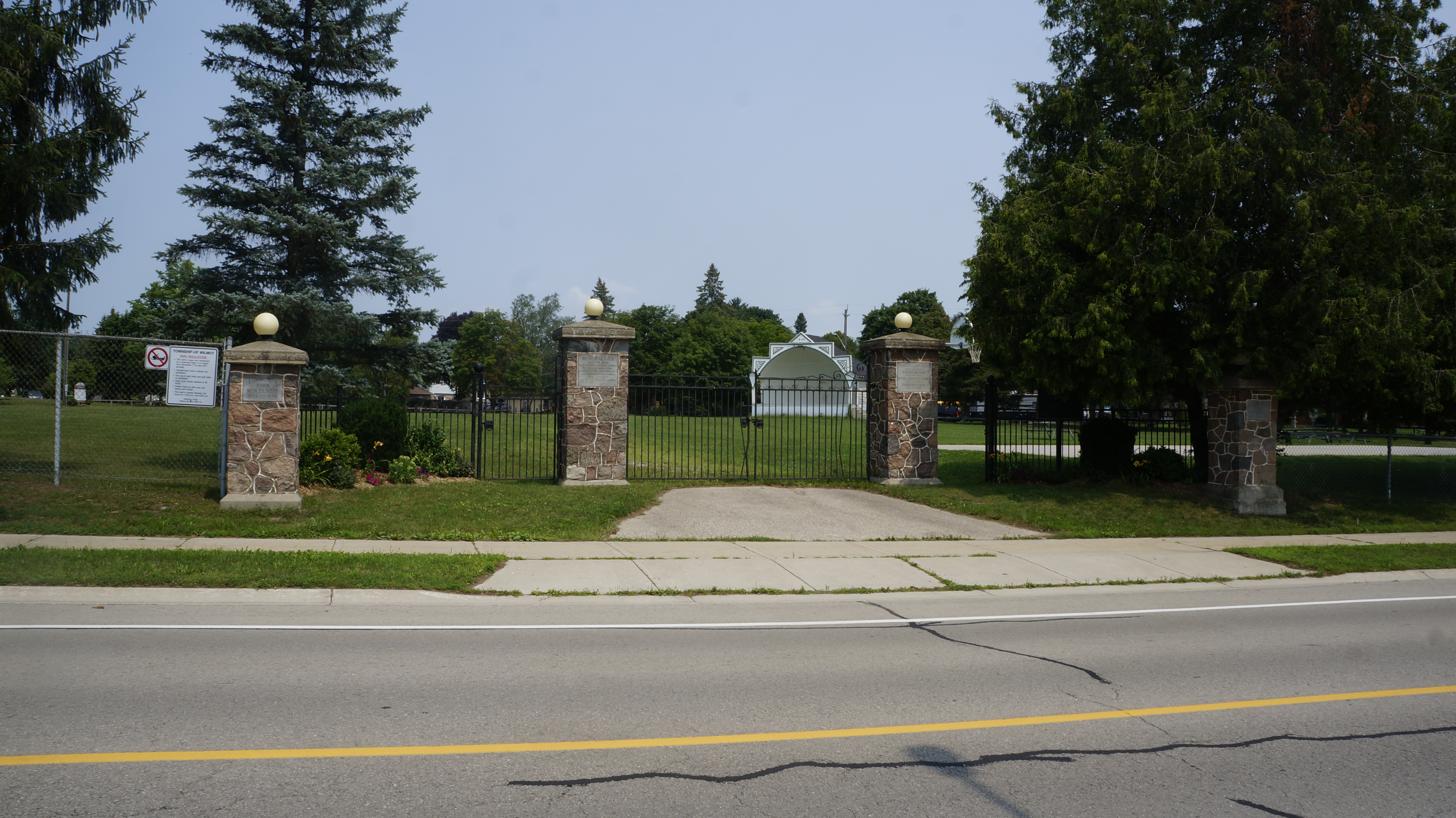
- New Dundee Community Park
- Interactive map of New Dundee
- Coordinates: 43°21′4″N 80°32′12″W
- Country: Canada
- Province: Ontario
- Regional municipality: Waterloo
- Township: Wilmot

Area
  - Land: 1.52 km^{2} (0.59 sq mi)

Population (2016)
  - Total: 1,119
  - Density: 734/km^{2} (1,900/sq mi)
- Time zone: UTC-5 (EST)
  - Summer (DST): UTC-4 (EDT)
- Forward sortation area: N0B 2E0
- Area codes: 519 and 226
- NTS Map: 040P07
- GNBC Code: FEAPA

New Dundee is a small community of 1,119 people at the time of the 2016 Census, in the township of Wilmot, Ontario, Canada. It is located southwest of Kitchener.

== History ==
The land grants to New Dundee's early settlers were largely in Concessions 2 and 3, Block A, Wilmot Township. The township was opened to settlement in 1824 and was not part of the German Company Tract purchased out of Haldimand Tract land, but lay to the west of it. Wilmot was divided into three blocks arranged latitudinally: Block A in the south, Block B in the north, and the German Block in the centre. While the German Block was largely settled by Germans, Blocks A and B were acquired by the Canada Land Company, and were settled by a mix of German, Irish, Scottish, and English people, along with others. One of the Company's goals was to promote English, Scottish, and Irish settlement in the township; However, only a small number of these people ever did settle in the area, and they were largely concentrated within Block A. While the German Block was connected to Waterloo Township by three major thoroughfares (Erb's Road, Snyder's Road, and Bleam's Road), each leading to an established mill, Block A only had one: the Huron Road, which unlike the others, was a long-distance route connecting as far west as Goderich and as far east as Guelph. It became the dominant roadway in the Waterloo County area until the arrival of the railways in the 1850s lessened its importance, and was a major transportation corridor within Upper Canada as a whole for many years.

New Dundee itself was founded by the Millar pioneer family. The Millars emigrated from Scotland around 1825, and originally settled in the Niagara area. Arriving in Waterloo Township, several of them at first moved to the Sand Hills area which would later become Berlin and finally, Kitchener, where they established the first general store in that community. John Millar was the first member of the family to settle in the New Dundee area; in 1826 he dammed Alder Creek and built the first sawmill and general store there. John named the community New Dundee after his home town of Dundee, Scotland. The settlement was located off the Huron Road, at the far southeast corner of Block A, requiring settlers to construct a connecting road in order to access the outside world conveniently.

Frederick Gourlay Millar later bought John's sawmill, house, and store, and also constructed a gristmill. The Millars were soon joined by other pioneer families: the Reichard family in 1829, who opened their own sawmill on the creek on land granted to them in lieu of payment for their work on the Huron Road, and the Bettschen family, who cleared the dense forest on the southern half of Lot 5, Concession 3 and built a farm and blacksmith shop. Another early settler was a squatter, Dan Schafer, who lived alone in a trapper's cabin on the northern half of Lot 5, Concession 3. Frederick Millar, who was civic-minded and had played a role in the early growth of Berlin, had a village plan drawn up in the 1850s. The planned-for village never truly materialized as shortly after, New Dundee, already located a distance from the Huron Road, was bypassed by the Grand Trunk Railway, which passed through the German Block communities of Petersburg, Baden, and New Hamburg instead.

The Post Office was opened in 1852. By 1870, there were two churches, two hotels, a school, the sawmill and the flour mill, and factories that produced shingles, rakes and flax, as well as two stores and two hotels. The population was 250.

In 1904, Ezra H. Thamer opened New Dundee's first Bell Telephone exchange, the New Dundee Rural Telephone Company, and started a small home-based creamery. By 1908, other investors joined the group, and the creamery became a larger operation, initially as the New Dundee Farmer’s Cooperative Creamery Company Ltd.; it was later renamed to the New Dundee Co-Operative Creamery Ltd. The operation became the community's largest industry, processing 140 million pounds of milk in 1964, for example. The business closed in 1998 and the factory was dismantled in 2005.

The current New Dundee Public School was built in 1928, with additions in 2008 and 2013.

The Dundee Country Club golf course opened in 1970. Many small businesses are located within the community on Alder Lake and some historic buildings are still standing.

William J. Wintemberg, called by some the "Father of Canadian Archaeology", and an expert on Iroquioan prehistory, was born in the village.

== Geography ==
New Dundee is situated along the Grand River watershed. The local stream is called Alder Creek. Alder Creek flows into the Nith River a few kilometres downstream. The original settlers built the town because of its creek.

== Notable people ==
- Randolph Mank (1954 – ), founder of MankGlobal Inc. consultancy in 2015
- Dilman Kinsey Erb (1857 – 1936), member of the House of Commons of Canada from 1896 – 1904

== See also ==
- List of population centres in Ontario
- List of unincorporated communities in Ontario
