= Colin Robertson (diplomat) =

Canadian diplomat

Donald Colin Robertson CM CD (born November 27, 1954) is a Canadian former diplomat and a commentator on international affairs specializing in Canada-United States relations.

== Education ==
Robertson was born in 1954 in Winnipeg, Manitoba. He received a Bachelor of Arts with Honors (First Class) from the University of Manitoba and then went on to complete his Masters in International Affairs at the Norman Paterson School of International Affairs (NPSIA) at Carleton University in Ottawa, Canada.

== Foreign Service ==
Robertson had a career in the Canadian foreign service spanning from 1977 to 2010. Over that time he served at Canada's Permanent Mission to the United Nations, as Vice Consul in the Canadian Consulate in New York City and as Counsellor and Consul in the Canadian Commission (now Consulate General) in Hong Kong.

He served as Consul General in Los Angeles from 2000-2004 where he was responsible for the American Southwest was appointed as the first head of the Advocacy Secretary and Minister at the Canadian Embassy in Washington. Mr Robertson worked in the Trade Negotiations Office during the Canada-US Free Trade Agreement negotiations and later was a member of the NAFTA Implementation Team. Mr. Robertson also held executive positions at Citizenship and Immigration, the Treasury Board Secretariat and with Petro-Canada International Assistance Corporation.

In his final assignment, Robertson directed a project at Carleton University's Centre for Trade Policy and Law with the support of the federal and provincial governments as well as the private sector on Canada-US Engagement.

== Other work ==
Robertson is currently a senior strategic advisor for McKenna, Long and Aldridge LLP where he focuses his practice on U.S.–Canada government relations and advising clients on policy issues that involve perspectives from both sides of the border. He is the vice president and a senior research fellow at the Canadian Defence and Foreign Affairs Institute based out of the institute's Ottawa office. He appears regularly on CBC, CTV and Global to comment on international affairs, and is a regular contributor to iPolitics and The Globe and Mail. He also works with the Canadian Council of Chief Executives.

He served as president of the Historica Foundation from 2006-2007 and is the honorary chair of the Canada Arizona Business Council. He is a member of the Pacific Council on International Policy. Robertson sits on the boards of the Conference of Defence Associations Institute and of Canada World Youth, where he is the vice chair.

He is also the former president and executive member of the National Capital Branch of the Canadian International Council. He was editor of bout de papier - Canada's Magazine of Diplomacy and Foreign Service] and president of the Professional Association of Foreign Service Officers.

He is a distinguished senior fellow at NPSIA, former member of Carleton's President's Advisory Council and a current member of the NPSIA Advisory Council.

He was named in Embassy Magazine 2012 edition of the "Top 80 Influencing Canada Foreign Policy".

== Awards ==
He is an Honorary Captain of the Royal Canadian Navy assigned to the Strategic Communications Directorate. The Alberta Motion Picture Industry Association awarded him with the 'Friend of the Industry' in 2004 for his work in promoting Alberta's film industry. Robertson was given the "Hot Potato Award" for helping to increase collaboration between U.S. and Canada organizations and stakeholders at the 2012 Pacific NorthWest Economic Region (PNWER) Summit. Also in 2012, Robertson was awarded the Queen Elizabeth II Diamond Jubilee Medal.

In 2026, he was named as an Member of the Order of Canada. He lives in Ottawa.
