= Randolph Mank =

Randolph Bruce Mank (born 1954) is a global business executive and a three-time former Canadian ambassador. He founded MankGlobal Inc. consultancy in 2015.

== Professional life ==
While still a graduate student, Mank was recruited to a research team surveying 3,000 Canadian households on energy consumption patterns in 1979. The major project was led by Dr. Gordon H.G. McDougall of Wilfrid Laurier University, together with Professors John Claxton, University of British Columbia and J.R. Brent Ritchie, University of Calgary. It was funded by the Canadian federal government as part of the effort to devise energy conservation programs following the oil shocks of 1973 and 1979. Mank co-authored an article on the subject with Dr. McDougall in the journal, Energy Policy, in September 1982.

He was recruited to the Canadian Foreign Service in 1981 while studying for a doctorate at the London School of Economics in London, U.K. Thus began a foreign service career that led him overseas to Greece, Sweden, Indonesia (twice), Japan, Pakistan, and Malaysia.

His initial assignments were in Greece and Sweden. In the latter, he was a delegate from 1984 to 1985 to the Stockholm Conference on Security and Cooperation in Europe, which was aimed at developing confidence-building measures between the Soviet Union and NATO during the Cold War.

This was followed by a headquarters' desk officer role handling Central America and Caribbean relations from 1985 to 1988. The region was destabilized during the period by insurgencies by the Contras in Nicaragua and the Farabundo Martí National Liberation Front (FMLN) in El Salvador. In addition to these two conflicts, he also handled relations with Costa Rica, Honduras, Panama, and Cuba, travelling to the region to meet with governments and opposition leaders during the time.

He then spent the decade of the 1990s working in and on Japan. He first studied Japanese at the U.S. State Department School in Yokohama from 1989 to 1991, before heading Diet (parliamentary) Relations at the Canadian embassy in Tokyo for four years. From 1996, he became Deputy Director and briefly Acting Director for Japan at the Department of Foreign Affairs and International Trade in Ottawa.

Appointed Director for Policy Planning in late 1999, he quarterbacked a Canadian foreign policy review and headed the G7 Foreign Minister's Secretariat for Canada for four years. Much of this work was shaped by the need for major policy responses following the September 11, 2001 terrorist attacks in New York and Washington, D.C. These responses included the Canadian military deployment to Afghanistan, Canada-U.S. Border Management initiatives, and a G7 Counter-Terrorism Action Plan. The latter was launched during Canada's year as G7 host in 2002, featuring strengthened financial tracking and other measures.

Mank was appointed Ambassador of Canada to Indonesia and Timor-Leste in 2003, where he led the Canadian response to the 2004-05 tsunami crisis in the northern Sumatra province of Aceh. He established Canada House in Aceh as a unique platform for all Canadian stakeholders involved in delivering emergency and recovery aid in the disaster zone. He also guided Canada-Indonesia counter-terrorism training and cooperation following numerous terrorist attacks on the Marriott Hotel in Jakarta and other locations in Bali and Java. He deployed election monitoring teams during the 2004 legislative election, as well as the 2005 gubernatorial and mayoral elections, in support of Indonesia's ongoing transition to democracy. On the commercial front, he worked closely with companies on expanding bilateral trade and investment. He also spearheaded the launch of the Canadian BlackBerry smartphone in Indonesia in 2004.

He returned to Ottawa in 2006 as Director-General for Asia South and South East Asia, guiding the work of eighteen missions and ambassadors with 1,400 staff in the region. He directed a re-engagement strategy with India during this period and served as Canada's Senior Official for ASEAN, negotiating a new Action Plan for Canada in South East Asia. He also oversaw the civilian Afghanistan Task Force, accompanying Governor General and Commander in Chief, Michaëlle Jean, as well as Foreign Minister Peter McKay, on separate visits to the front lines in Kandahar and Kabul in 2007 and 2008.

He was subsequently appointed High Commissioner (ambassador) to Pakistan in 2008, where he continued to develop a Pakistan-Afghanistan border initiative that he had begun in Ottawa. He chaired a G7 working group on the border initiative in Islamabad while ambassador there.

Mank's final diplomatic assignment was as Canada's High Commissioner (ambassador) to Malaysia, between 2010 and 2012. There, he co-founded the Malaysia-Canada Oil and Gas Council, and worked closely with the state energy giant, Petronas, to bring a $36 billion liquefied natural gas (LNG) investment to Canada. At the time, it was the largest ever foreign investment by Petronas and its first ever in Canada. It was also the largest ever inward investment project in Canadian history.

Mank was recruited to the private sector in 2012, working first as Vice President Asia for BlackBerry. He handled government relations, public policy, and business development across Asia for the corporation that invented the smartphone and dominated the market at the time. He worked with governments in the region to stave off threats to shut down BlackBerry due to misuse of their impenetrable security.

Later, he became President Asia-Pacific for SICPA of Switzerland, where he led a team offering technologies to governments and corporations for the tracking and tracing of illicit trade.

Mank has served in various board roles at the Department of Foreign Affairs and International Trade in Canada, including Secretary to Policy Board, Co-Chair of the Corporate Social Responsibility Group, and Chair of the Focus India Group. Abroad, he was Chair of the G7 Pakistan-Afghanistan Working Group in Islamabad, Chair of the Indonesia-Canada Chamber of Commerce in Jakarta, Patron of the Malaysia-Canada Business Council in Kuala Lumpur, as well as Executive Board member of the Canada-ASEAN Business Council and the Canadian Chamber of Commerce in Singapore.

He was named Canadian Public Service Mentor of the Year in 1999, and a Laurier Top 100 Alumni of Achievement in 2011.

He founded MankGlobal Inc. in 2015, a consultancy that supports clients with business development, government relations, and representation services.

He is a Fellow of the Canadian Global Affairs Institute, as well as the Balsillie School of International Affairs. He is also a Distinguished Fellow of New Westminster College. In addition to his consulting work, he continues to write and comment on foreign policy, business, and trade issues.

== Personal life ==
Mank began life as the youngest in a family of seven siblings in the rural village of New Dundee, Ontario. His father, Clayton Mank, was born in 1910 in what was then called Berlin, Ontario. Due to anti-German sentiment, the spelling of the family name was changed from Moenck during World War I. The city name of Berlin was changed to Kitchener in 1916. His father died in 1956 at age 46. Led by a single mother of Irish-Scottish heritage, nee Mary Montgomery, the family subsisted in a small wooden cottage in New Dundee, before moving to Kitchener, Ontario. The only family member to attend university, Randolph obtained bachelor's and master's degrees from Wilfrid Laurier University in Waterloo, Ontario between 1973 and 1979 (B.A. Honours English and Political Science, 1977; M.A. Political Science 1979). He then moved to the United Kingdom to conduct Ph.D. research on energy policy at the London School of Economics between 1979 and 1981.

He married Fumiko Kitano in Tokyo in 1996 (divorced 2008) and has two adult children, Mari-Lisa and Noah Mank. He remarried Singaporean Lenny Surjati in 2016 and gained two adult step-children, Phoebe and Phylicia Tan. He maintains residences in Canada and Singapore.

== Publications ==
- "Lessons from COVID-19 for 5G and Internet Security" - Canadian Global Affairs Institute - April 2020
- "Let's get Canada's foreign policy house in order" - Policy Options - January 2020
- "Canada's quixotic foreign policy in the shifting global landscape" - Canadian Foreign Policy Journal - September 2019
- "A new Cold War has begun: Iran and Canada are early battlegrounds" - Policy Options - August 2019
- "Stop the chest-thumping over China" - The Hill Times - May 2019
- "Does Canada Need a Foreign Policy Review" - Canadian Global Affairs Institute - January 2019
- "Reassessing Canadian Trade in Asia" - Canadian Global Affairs Institute - January 2018
- "Quantum Diplomacy for a New Technological Age" - Canadian Global Affairs Institute - December 2017
- "Consumer energy conservation policy in Canada: Behavioural and institutional obstacles" - Energy Policy Journal - September 1982
