= History of German foreign policy =

German foreign policy since 1871

The history of German foreign policy covers diplomatic developments and international history since 1871.

Before 1866, Habsburg Austria and its German Confederation were the nominal leader in German affairs, but the Hohenzollern Kingdom of Prussia exercised increasingly dominant influence in German affairs, owing partly to its ability to participate in German Confederation politics through its Brandenburg holding, and its ability to influence trade through its Zollverein network. The question of excluding or including Austria's influence was settled by the Prussian victory in the Austro-Prussian War in 1866. The unification of Germany was made possible by the Franco-Prussian War of 1870–71, in which the smaller states joined behind Prussia in a smashing victory over France. The German Empire was put together in 1871 by Otto von Bismarck, who dominated German and indeed all of European diplomatic history until he was forced to resign in 1890.

The new German Empire immediately became the dominant diplomatic, political, military and economic force in Continental Europe, although it never had as large a population as the Russian Empire. The Great Britain continued to dominate the world in naval affairs, international trade, and finance. The Germans tried to catch up in empire building but felt an inferiority complex. Bismarck felt a strong need to keep France isolated, lest its desire for revenge frustrate his goals, which after 1871 were European peace and stability. When Kaiser Wilhelm II removed Bismarck in 1890, German foreign policy became erratic and increasingly isolated, with only Austria-Hungary as a serious ally and partner.

During the July Crisis, Germany played a major role in starting World War I in 1914. The Allies defeated Germany in 1918. The Versailles Peace Treaty was punishing for the new Weimar Republic.

By the mid-1920s, Germany had largely recovered its role as a great power thanks to astute diplomacy on its own part, the willingness of the British and Americans compromise, and financial aid from New York. Internal German politics became frenzied after 1929 and the impact of the Great Depression, leading to a takeover by Adolf Hitler and the Nazis in 1933. They introduced a highly aggressive foreign policy in alliance with Italy and Japan. The British and French tried to appease in 1938, which only whetted Hitler's hunger for more territory, especially in the East. Nazi Germany had by far the most decisive role in starting World War II in 1939.

Since 1945, Germany has recovered from massive wartime destruction to become again the richest and most powerful country in Europe, this time it is fully integrated into European affairs. Its major conflict was West Germany versus East Germany, with East Germany being a client state of the Soviet Union until the collapse of the Soviet Union. Since the 1970s, (West) Germany has also sought to play a more important role internationally again. After the collapse of Communism in 1989-1991, East Germany was merged into Germany, and Berlin became the capital of the united country. NATO expanded to include the former East Germany and also most of the East European countries that had been satellites of the USSR. Relations with Russia worsened after the seizure of Crimea from Ukraine in 2014. However, Germany depends on Russia for much of its energy supply, and Russia needs the cash payments for oil and gas. Relations were tense with the United States during the first Presidency of Donald Trump (2017–2021) but improved at the start of the Presidency of Joe Biden (2021–2024).

== Bismarck and unification ==
Prussia entered the ranks of the great powers shortly after becoming a kingdom in 1701. It became increasingly large and powerful in the 18th and 19th centuries, having a major voice in European affairs under the reign of Frederick the Great (1740–1786). At the Congress of Vienna (1814–15), which redrew the map of Europe following Napoleon's defeat, Prussia acquired rich new territories, including the coal-rich Ruhr. The country then grew rapidly in influence economically and politically, and became the core of the new North German Confederation in 1867, and then of the German Empire in 1871. The Kingdom of Prussia was now so large and so dominant in the new Germany that Junkers and other Prussian elites identified more and more as Germans and less as Prussians.

Prussian Minister-President Otto von Bismarck controlled Prussian foreign policy and his goal was to unify the German states into a powerful new nation under Prussian leadership. He used wars against Denmark, Austria and France to achieve his goal in 1871. At the same time, Austria was allied with smaller German states and Bismarck decided it was necessary to cut Austria off—Austria would not be part of the new German empire. In 1864, eighteen-year-old Ludwig II, became King of Bavaria, a smaller and much less powerful realm than Prussia, but nonetheless a key to southern Germany. Tensions between Austria and Prussia escalated steadily toward war. Bismarck had tried to convince Bavaria to be neutral but the young king refused and continued Bavaria's alliance with Austria. In 1866, the Austro-Prussian War began. Bavaria and most of the south German states remained allied with Austria, but would play a small role in the war against Prussia. Prussia quickly defeated the Kingdom of Hanover, then won the Battle of Königgrätz (3 July 1866) against Austria, which soon sued for peace.

== 1871–1919 ==
=== Military role in shaping foreign policy ===
After the creation of the German Empire in 1871, diplomatic relations were handled by the Imperial government, rather than by lower-level governments such as the Prussian and Bavarian governments. Down to 1914, the Chancellor typically dominated foreign policy decisions, supported by his Foreign Minister. The powerful German Army reported separately to the Emperor, and increasingly played a major role in shaping foreign policy when military alliances or warfare was at issue.

In diplomatic terms, Germany used the Prussian system of military attaches attached to diplomatic locations, with highly talented young officers assigned to evaluate the strengths, weaknesses, and military capabilities of their assigned nations. These officers used close observation, conversations, and paid agents to produce very high quality reports that gave a significant advantage to the military planners.

The military staff grew increasingly powerful, reducing the role of the Minister of War and increasingly asserting itself in foreign policy decisions. Otto von Bismarck, the Imperial Chancellor from 1871 to 1890, was annoyed by military interference in foreign policy affairs–in 1887, for example, the military tried to convince the Emperor to declare war on Russia; they also encouraged Austria to attack Russia. Bismarck never controlled the army, but he did complain vehemently, and the military leaders drew back. In 1905, when the Morocco affair was roiling international politics, Chief of the German General Staff Alfred von Schlieffen called for a preventive war against France. At a critical point in the July crisis of 1914, Helmuth von Moltke, the Chief of Staff, without telling the Emperor or Chancellor, advised his Austro-Hungarian counterpart Franz Conrad von Hötzendorf to mobilize against Russia at once. During World War I, Field Marshal Paul von Hindenburg and General Erich Ludendorff increasingly set foreign policy, working directly with the Emperor–and indeed shaped his decision-making–leaving the chancellor and civilian officials in the dark. Historian Gordon A. Craig says that the crucial decisions in going to war in 1914, "were made by the soldiers and that, in making them, they displayed an almost complete disregard for political considerations."

=== Bismarck ===
Bismarck's post-1871 foreign policy was peace-oriented. Germany was content—it had all it wanted so that its main goal was peace and stability. However, peaceful relations with France became difficult in 1871 when Germany annexed the provinces of Alsace and Lorraine. German public opinion demanded it to humiliate France, and the Army wanted its more defensible frontiers. Bismarck reluctantly gave in—French would never forget or forgive, he calculated, so might as well take the provinces. Germany's foreign policy fell into a trap with no exit. "In retrospect it is easy to see that the annexation of Alsace–Lorraine was a tragic mistake." Once the annexation took place the only policy that made sense was trying to isolate France so it had no strong allies. However France complicated Berlin's plans when it became friends with Russia. In 1905 a German plan for an alliance with Russia fell through because Russia was too close to France.

The League of Three Emperors (Dreikaisersbund) was signed in 1872 by Russia, Austria, and Germany. It stated that republicanism and socialism were common enemies and that the three powers would discuss any matters concerning foreign policy. Bismarck needed good relations with Russia in order to keep France isolated. In 1877–1878, Russia fought a victorious war with the Ottoman Empire and attempted to impose the Treaty of San Stefano on it. This upset the British in particular, as they were long concerned with preserving the Ottoman Empire and preventing a Russian takeover of the Bosphorus Strait. Germany hosted the Congress of Berlin (1878), whereby a more moderate peace settlement was agreed to. Germany had no direct interest in the Balkans, however, which was largely an Austrian and Russian sphere of influence, although King Carol I of Romania was a German prince.

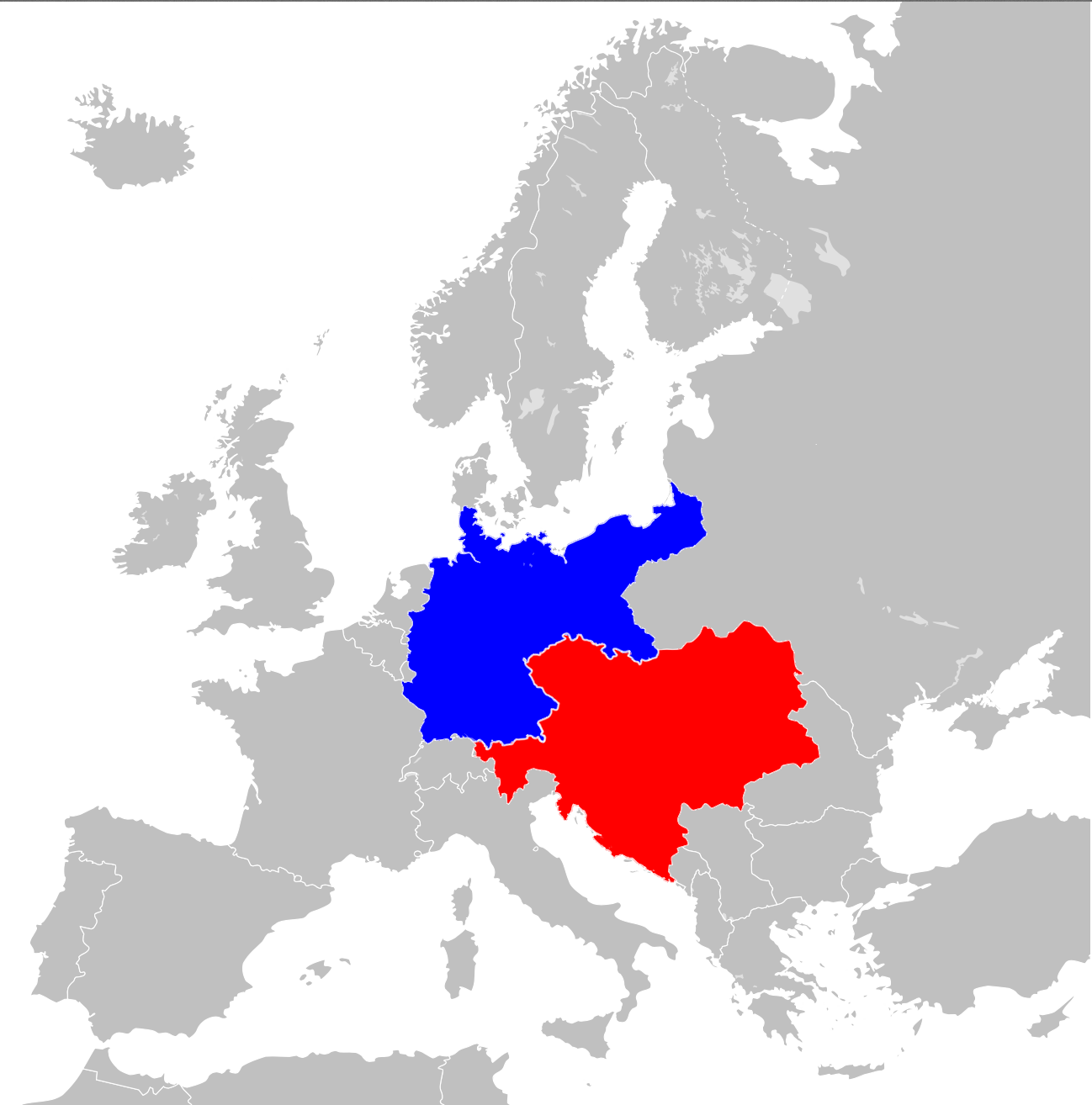
The Dual Alliance in 1914, Germany in blue and Austria-Hungary in red

=== Dual Alliance (1879) with Austria-Hungary ===
In 1879, Bismarck formed a Dual Alliance of Germany and Austria-Hungary, with the aim of mutual military assistance in the case of an attack from Russia, which was not satisfied with the agreement reached at the Congress of Berlin. The establishment of the Dual Alliance led Russia to take a more conciliatory stance, and in 1887, the so-called Reinsurance Treaty was signed between Germany and Russia: in it, the two powers agreed on mutual military support in the case that France attacked Germany, or in case of an Austrian attack on Russia. Russia turned its attention eastward to Asia and remained largely inactive in European politics for the next 25 years. In 1882, Italy joined the Dual Alliance to form a Triple Alliance. Italy wanted to defend its interests in North Africa against France's colonial policy. In return for German and Austrian support, Italy committed itself to assisting Germany in the case of a French military attack.

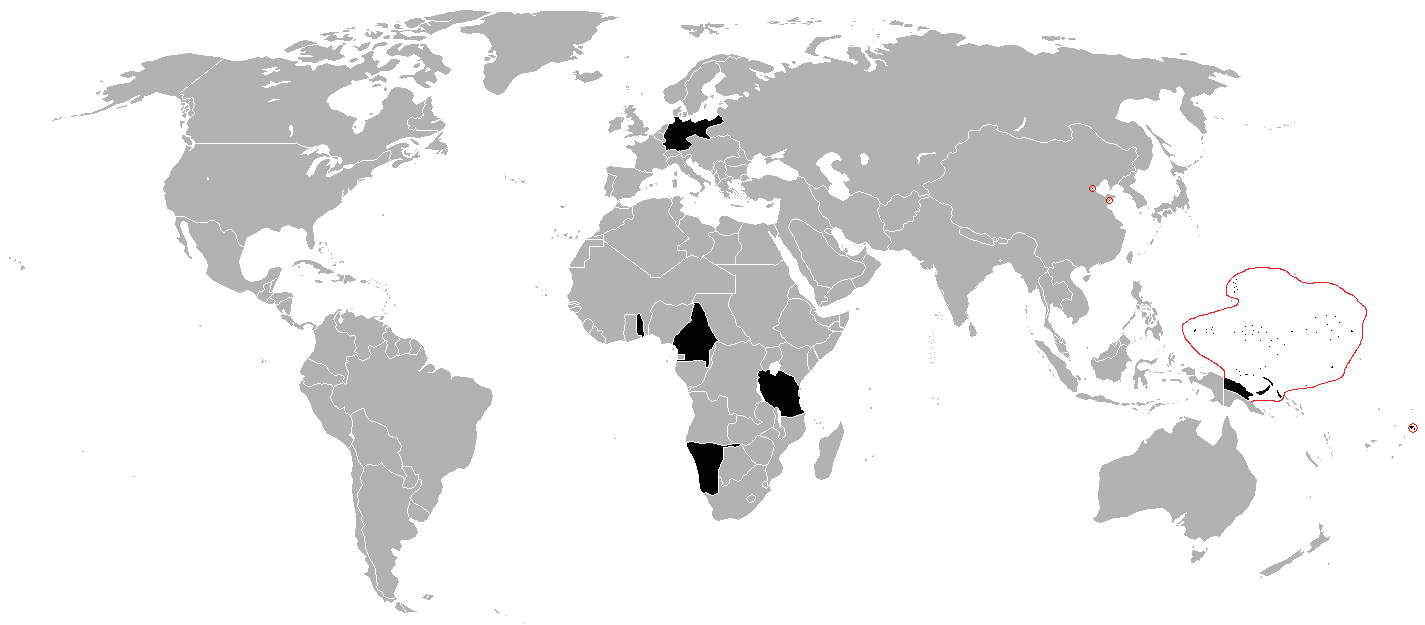
German colonies and protectorates in 1914

=== German colonial empire ===
For a long time, Bismarck had refused to give into widespread public and elite demands to give Germany "a place in the sun" through the acquisition of overseas colonies, stating that he was "no man for colonies". In 1880 Bismarck gave way, and a number of colonies were established overseas building on private German business ventures. In Africa, these were Togo, the Cameroons, German South-West Africa, and German East Africa; in Oceania, they were German New Guinea, the Bismarck Archipelago, and the Marshall Islands. In fact, it was Bismarck himself who helped initiate the Berlin Conference of 1885. He did it to "establish international guidelines for the acquisition of African territory" (see Colonisation of Africa). This conference was an impetus for the "Scramble for Africa" and "New Imperialism".

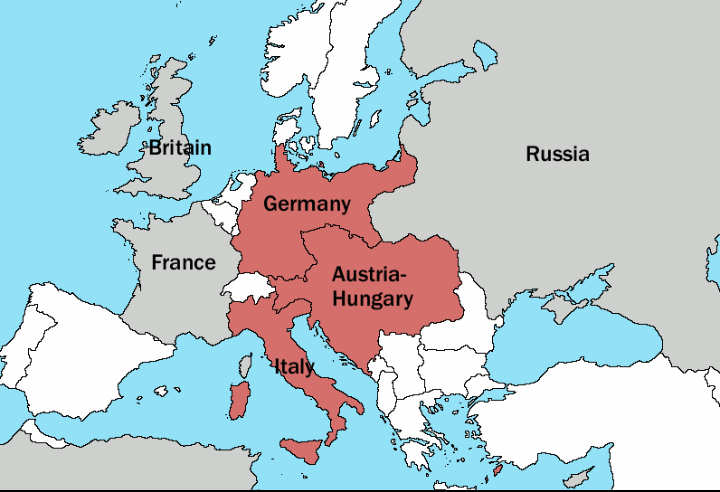
The Triple Alliance (1913 in red) was constructed to isolate France.

=== Kaiser Wilhelm ===
After removing Bismarck in 1890 the young Kaiser Wilhelm sought aggressively to increase Germany's influence in the world (Weltpolitik). Foreign policy was in the hands of an erratic Kaiser, who played an increasingly reckless hand, and the powerful foreign office under the leadership of Friedrich von Holstein. The foreign office argued that: first, a long-term coalition between France and Russia had to fall apart; secondly, Russia and Britain would never get together; and, finally, Britain would eventually seek an alliance with Germany. Germany refused to renew its treaties with Russia. But Russia did form a closer relationship with France in the Dual Alliance of 1894, since both were worried about the possibilities of German aggression. Furthermore, Anglo–German relations cooled as Germany aggressively tried to build a new empire and engaged in a naval race with Britain; London refused to agree to the formal alliance that Germany sought. Berlin's analysis proved mistaken on every point, leading to Germany's increasing isolation and its dependence on the Triple Alliance, which brought together Germany, Austria-Hungary, and Italy. The Triple Alliance was undermined by differences between Austria and Italy, and in 1915 Italy switched sides.

Meanwhile, the Imperial German Navy under Admiral Alfred von Tirpitz had ambitions to rival the great British Royal Navy, and dramatically expanded its fleet in the early 20th century to protect the colonies and exert power worldwide. Tirpitz started a programme of warship construction in 1898. In 1890, Germany had gained the island of Heligoland in the North Sea from Britain in exchange for the East African island of Zanzibar, and proceeded to construct a great naval base there. This posed a direct threat to British hegemony on the seas, with the result that negotiations for an alliance between Germany and Britain broke down. The British, however, kept well ahead in the naval race by the introduction of the highly advanced new Dreadnought battleship in 1907.

==== Two crises in Morocco ====
In the First Moroccan Crisis of 1905, Germany nearly came to blows with Britain and France when the latter attempted to establish a protectorate over Morocco. The Germans were upset at having not been informed about French intentions, and declared their support for Moroccan independence. William II made a highly provocative speech regarding this. The following year, a conference was held in which all of the European powers except Austria-Hungary (by now little more than a German satellite) sided with France. A compromise was brokered by the United States in the Algeciras Conference where the French relinquished some, but not all, control over Morocco.

The Second Moroccan Crisis of 1911 saw another dispute over Morocco erupt when France tried to suppress a revolt there. Germany, still smarting from the previous quarrel, agreed to a settlement whereby the French ceded some territory in Central Africa in exchange for Germany's renouncing any right to intervene in Moroccan affairs. It was a diplomatic triumph for France.

Historian Heather Jones argues that Germany's use of warlike rhetoric was a deliberate diplomatic ploy:

Another German strategy was to stage dramatic gestures, and dangerously play up the threat of war, in the belief that this would impress upon other European powers the importance of consultation with Germany on imperial issues: the fact that France had not considered it necessary to make a bilateral agreement with Germany over Morocco rankled, especially given Germany was deeply insecure about its newly acquired Great Power status. Hence Germany opted for an increase in belligerent rhetoric and, theatrically, Kaiser Wilhelm II dramatically interrupted a Mediterranean cruise to visit Tangier, where he declared Germany's support for the Sultan's independence and integrity of his kingdom, turning Morocco overnight into an international 'crisis.'

Berlin's Morocco adventures resulted in failure and frustration, as military cooperation and friendship between France and Britain was strengthened, and Germany was left more isolated. An even more momentous consequence was the heightened sense of frustration and readiness for war in Germany. It spread beyond the political elite to much of the press and most of the political parties except for the Liberals and Social Democrats on the left. The Pan-German element grew in strength and denounced their government's retreat as treason, stepping up chauvinistic support for war.

==== Fears of encirclement ====
Berlin was deeply suspicious of a supposed conspiracy of its enemies: that year-by-year in the early 20th century it was systematically encircled by enemies. There was a growing fear that the supposed enemy coalition of Russia, France and Britain was getting stronger militarily every year, especially Russia. The longer Berlin waited the less likely it would prevail in a war. According to American historian Gordon A. Craig, it was after the set-back in Morocco in 1905 that the fear of encirclement began to be a potent factor in German politics. Few outside observers agreed with the notion of Germany as a victim of deliberate encirclement. English historian G. M. Trevelyan expressed the British viewpoint:

The encirclement, such as it was, was of Germany's own making. She had encircled herself by alienating France over Alsace-Lorraine, Russia by her support of Austria-Hungary's anti--Slav policy in the Balkans, England by building her rival fleet. She had created with Austria-Hungary a military bloc in the heart of Europe so powerful and yet so restless that her neighbors on each side had no choice but either to become her vassals or to stand together for protection....They used their central position to create fear in all sides, in order to gain their diplomatic ends. And then they complained that on all sides they had been encircled.

=== First World War ===
Ethnic groups demanded their own nation states, threatening violence. This upset the stability of multinational empires (Germany, Russia, Austria-Hungary, Turkey/Ottoman). When ethnic Serbians assassinate the Austrian heir, Austria decided to heavily punish Serbia. Germany stood behind its ally Austria in a confrontation with Serbia, but Serbia was under the informal protection of Russia, which was allied to France. Germany was the leader of the Central Powers, which included Austria-Hungary, the Ottoman Empire, and later Bulgaria; arrayed against them were the Allies, consisting chiefly of Russia, France, Britain, and in 1915 Italy.

British historian Paul Kennedy in 1980 summarizes the scholarly consensus on why neutral Britain went to war with Germany. He argues that London's awareness of Germany's superior economic power was a factor. Kennedy such minor factors as the disputes over economic trade imperialism, the Baghdad Railway, confrontations in Central and Eastern Europe, high-charged political rhetoric and domestic pressure-groups. Germany's reliance time and again on sheer power, while Britain increasingly appealed to moral sensibilities, played a major role, especially in seeing the invasion of Belgium as a profound moral and diplomatic crime. Kennedy argues that by far the main reason was London's fear that a repeat of 1870 — when Prussia and the German states smashed France — would mean that Germany, with a powerful army and navy, would control the English Channel and northwest France. British policy makers insisted that would be a catastrophe for British security.

Canadian historian Holger Herwig summarizes the scholarly consensus on Germany's final decision:

Berlin did not go to war in 1914 in a bid for 'world power', as historian Fritz Fischer claimed, but rather first to secure and thereafter to enhance the borders of 1871. Secondly, the decision for war was made in July 1914 and not, as some scholars have claimed, at a nebulous 'war council' on 8 December 1912. Thirdly, no one in Berlin had planned for war before 1914; no long-term economic or military plans have been uncovered to suggest otherwise....The fact remains that on 5 July 1914 Berlin gave Vienna unconditional support (‘blank cheque’) for a war in the Balkans....Civilian as well as military planners in Berlin, like their counterparts in Vienna, were dominated by a 'strike-now-better-than-later' mentality. They were aware that Russia’s 'Big Programme' of rearmament...would be completely around 1916–17....No one doubted that war was in the offing. The diplomatic and political record...contains countless dire prognostications of the inevitability of a 'final reckoning' between Slavs and Teutons. Leaders in Berlin also saw war as the only solution to 'encirclement'....In short, war was viewed as both apocalyptic fear and apocalyptic hope.

=== German war goals ===
The Germans never finalized a set of war aims. However, in September 1914, Kurt Riezler, a senior staff aide to German Chancellor Theobald von Bethmann Hollweg sketched out some possible ideas—dubbed by historians the "September Program." It emphasized economic gains, turning all of Central and Western Europe into a common market controlled by and for the benefit of Germany. Belgium would become a vassal state, there would be a series of naval bases threatening England, Germany would seize much of Eastern Europe from Russia – as in fact it did in early 1918. There would be a crippling financial indemnity on France making it economically dependent on Germany. The Netherlands would become a dependent satellite, and British commerce would be excluded. Germany would rebuild a colonial empire in Africa. The ideas sketched by Riezler were not fully formulated, were not endorsed by Bethmann Hollweg, and were not presented to or approved by any official body. The ideas were formulated on the run after the war began, and did not mean these ideas had been reflected a prewar plan, as historian Fritz Fischer fallaciously assumed. However they do indicate that if Germany had won it would have taken a very aggressive dominant position in Europe. Indeed, it took a very harsh position on occupied Belgium and France starting in 1914, and in the Treaty of Brest Litovsk imposed on Russia in 1918.

The stalemate by the end of 1914 forced serious consideration of long-term goals. Britain, France, Russia and Germany all separately concluded this was not a traditional war with limited goals. Britain, France and Russia became committed to the destruction of German military power, and Germany to the dominance of German military power in Europe. One month into the war, Britain, France and Russia agreed not to make a separate peace with Germany, and discussions began about enticing other countries to join in return for territorial gains. However, as Barbara Jelavich observes, "Throughout the war Russian actions were carried out without real coordination or joint planning with the Western powers." There was no serious three-way coordination of strategy, nor was there much coordination between Britain and France before 1917.

== 1919–1933 ==
=== Treaty of Versailles ===
The Treaty of Versailles proclaimed that Germany was guilty of starting the war and therefore had to pay for it, with unspecified very heavy reparations to be paid the winners, especially to Belgium and France. Foreign Minister Ulrich Graf von Brockdorff-Rantzau on 7 May 1919, rejected the assumption that Germany was guilty. Nevertheless, he was forced to sign the treaty as Allied armies occupied parts of Germany and crippling economic sanctions cut off food supplies. Germans of all political shades denounced the treaty—particularly the War Guilt Clause as an insult to the nation's honour. Germany's first democratically elected head of government, Philipp Scheidemann, resigned rather than sign the treaty. In an emotional and polemical address to the Weimar National Assembly on 12 May 1919, he denounced the treaty.

=== Weimar Republic ===
The humiliating peace terms in the Treaty of Versailles provoked bitter indignation throughout Germany, and seriously weakened the new democratic regime. Gustav Stresemann, the foreign minister 1923–1929, achieved good relations with the major powers, and with the Soviet Union,

When Germany defaulted on its reparation payments, French and Belgian troops occupied the heavily industrialised Ruhr district in January 1923. The German government encouraged the population of the Ruhr to passive resistance: shops would not sell goods to the foreign soldiers, coal mines would not dig for the foreign troops, trams in which members of the occupation army had taken seat would be left abandoned in the middle of the street. The passive resistance proved effective, insofar as the occupation became a loss-making deal for the French government. But the Ruhr fight also led to hyperinflation, and many who lost all their fortune would become bitter enemies of the Weimar Republic, and voters of the anti-democratic right.

Germany was the first state to establish diplomatic relations with the new Soviet Union. Under the Treaty of Rapallo, Germany accorded the Soviet Union de jure recognition, and the two signatories mutually cancelled all pre-war debts and renounced war claims. In October 1925 the Treaty of Locarno was signed by Germany, France, Belgium, Britain and Italy. Germany officially recognized its post-World War I western border for the first time, guaranteed peace with France and Belgium and pledged to observe the demilitarization of the Rhineland. If the terms of the treaty were broken, the signatories promised to come to the aid of the country against which the violation had taken place. As part of the Locarno Treaties, Germany also signed arbitration agreements with Poland and the First Czechoslovak Republic to ensure that any future conflict would be settled by impartial arbitration rather than by the use of force, but there was no guarantee of the inviolability of Germany's eastern borders as there had been in the west. Locarno paved the way for Germany's admission to the League of Nations in 1926.

== Nazi era, 1933-39 ==
Hitler came to power in January 1933, and inaugurated an aggressive power designed to give Germany economic and political domination across central Europe. He did not attempt to recover the lost colonies. Until August 1939, the Nazis denounced Communists and the Soviet Union as the greatest enemy, along with the Jews.

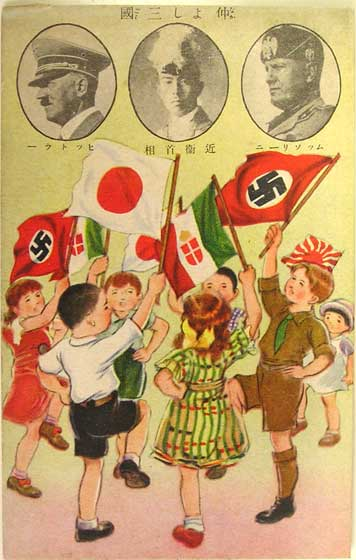
Japanese poster promoting the Axis cooperation in 1938

Hitler's diplomatic strategy in the 1930s was to make seemingly reasonable demands, threatening war if they were not met. When opponents tried to appease him, he accepted the gains that were offered, then went to the next target. That aggressive strategy worked as Germany pulled out of the League of Nations (1933), rejected the Versailles Treaty and began to re-arm (1935), won back the Saar (1935), remilitarized the Rhineland (1936), formed an alliance ("axis") with Mussolini's Italy (1936), sent massive military aid to the Nationalists in the Spanish Civil War (1936–39), seized Austria (1938), took over Czechoslovakia after the British and French appeasement of the Munich Agreement of 1938, formed a nonagression pact with Joseph Stalin's Soviet Union in August 1939, and finally invaded Poland in September 1939. Britain and France declared war and World War II began – somewhat sooner than the Nazis expected or were ready for.

After establishing the "Rome-Berlin axis" with Benito Mussolini, and signing the Anti-Comintern Pact with Japan – which was joined by Italy a year later in 1937 – Hitler felt able to take the offensive in foreign policy. On 12 March 1938, German troops marched into Austria, where an attempted Nazi coup had been unsuccessful in 1934. When Austrian-born Hitler entered Vienna, he was greeted by loud cheers. Four weeks later, 99% of Austrians voted in favour of the annexation (Anschluss) of their country Austria to the German Reich. After Austria, Hitler turned to Czechoslovakia, where the 3.5 million-strong Sudeten German minority was demanding equal rights and self-government. At the Munich Conference of September 1938, Hitler, the Italian leader Benito Mussolini, British Prime Minister Neville Chamberlain and French Prime Minister Édouard Daladier agreed upon the cession of Sudetenland to the German Reich by Czechoslovakia. Hitler thereupon declared that all of German Reich's territorial claims had been fulfilled. However, hardly six months after the Munich Agreement, in March 1939, Hitler used the smoldering quarrel between Slovaks and Czechs as a pretext for taking over the rest of Czechoslovakia as the Protectorate of Bohemia and Moravia. In the same month, he secured the return of Memel from Lithuania to Germany. Chamberlain was forced to acknowledge that his policy of appeasement towards Hitler had failed.

Hitler's speeches sometimes did mention return of the lost African colonies, as a bargaining point, but at all times his real target was Eastern Europe.

=== World War II ===
Germany's foreign policy during the war involved the creation of allied governments under direct or indirect control from Berlin. A main goal was obtaining soldiers from the senior allies, such as Italy and Hungary, and millions of workers and ample food supplies from subservient allies such as Vichy France. By the fall of 1942, there were 24 divisions from Romania on the Eastern Front, 10 from Italy and 10 from Hungary. When a country was no longer dependable, Germany would assume full control, as it did with France in 1942, Italy in 1943, and Hungary in 1944. Full control allowed the Nazis to achieve their high priority of mass murdering all Jewish population. Although Japan was officially a powerful ally, the relationship was distant and there was little coordination or cooperation, such as Germany's refusal to share the secret formula for making synthetic oil from coal until late in the war.

Hitler devoted most of his attention during the war to military and diplomatic affairs. DiNardo argues that in Europe Germany's foreign-policy was dysfunctional during the war, as Hitler treated each ally separately, and never bothered to create any sort of combined staff that would synchronize policies, armaments, and strategies. Italy, Finland, Romania, and Hungary each dealt with Berlin separately, and never coordinated their activities. Germany was reluctant to share its powerful weapons systems, or to train Axis officers. There were some exceptions, such as the close collaboration between the German and Italian forces in North Africa.

== Postwar ==
Since 1951, Germany has been at the heart of European integration. The reunification in 1990, which saw East Germany merged into West Germany, promoted peaceful integration with its neighbors. Strong ties with the United States remain central to German foreign policy.

Within the framework of NATO and an integrated European Union Military Staff, the Federal Republic has resumed the deployment of military units to mediate in conflict regions worldwide.

Germany is one of the world's strongest supporters for ecological awareness in response to climate change and global warming.

=== 1945–1990 ===
==== Westbindung ====
"Bindung" is the German word for fixation or bond; "Westbindung" is Germany's implant into Europe and the Western World.

In particular during the Cold War – but continuous into the 21st century – (West-) German foreign policy pursues the country's integration into NATO and a strong co-operation and collective security with its Western partners.

Germany, as a democratic market economy and the world's third-richest economy (nominal GDP, behind the U.S. and Japan), Germany's foreign economic interests are centered free and secure world trade. It is the world's largest exporting nation.

==== Ostpolitik ====
Under the Hallstein Doctrine, the FRG did not have any diplomatic relations with countries in Eastern Bloc until the early 1970s, when Willy Brandt's Ostpolitik led to increased dialogue and treaties like the Treaty of Warsaw, where West Germany accepted the Oder-Neisse line as German-Polish border, and the Basic Treaty, where West and East Germany accepted each other as sovereign entities. Both Germany states were admitted to the United Nations on 18 September 1973.

==== German Question and German Problem ====
Ever since the creation of the consolidated German nation state in 1871, the German Problem as to what interests, ambitions, and borders Germany would have and how it would fit into the international system, was a major concern not just for the neighbours but also for German policy-makers themselves. This Problem was temporarily suspended during the Cold War as with Germany being a divided nation, the question as to how to reunify the country (the German Question) would take precedence over other considerations. During the Cold War, both Germanys also lacked the power to challenge the system more generally.

==== Latin America ====
Strong foreign policy differences appeared in the 1970s regarding oppressive right-wing dictatorships in Latin America according to Felix Botta. The Brandt government denounced the military junta in Chile after 1973, and gave asylum to its political refugees. However, Schmidt's government was hostile to left-wing terrorism and reversed policy in dramatic fashion, welcoming the anti-democratic coup by the National Reorganization Process in Argentina in 1976. Schmidt accepted the “Dirty War” policy of repression as necessary to fight leftist subversion in Argentina, and refused to accept any of its political refugees. Furthermore, West Germany sold billions of marks worth of weapons to Argentina.

=== 1990–2001 ===
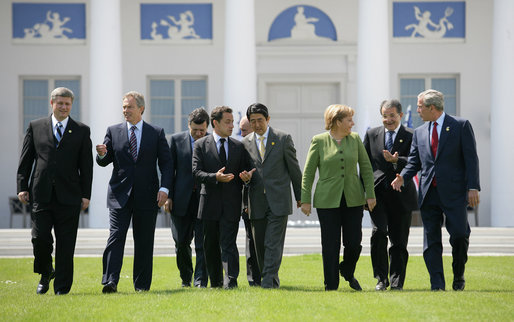
Leaders of the 33rd G8 summit in Heiligendamm, Germany

After the Fall of the Berlin Wall and the Treaty on the Final Settlement With Respect to Germany, German reunification took effect on 3 October 1990.

On 14 November 1990, Germany and Poland signed a treaty confirming the Oder-Neisse line. They also concluded a cooperation treaty on 17 June 1991. Germany concluded four treaties with the Soviet Union covering the overall bilateral relationship, economic relations, the withdrawal of Soviet troops from the territory of the former German Democratic Republic, and German support for those troops. The Kremlin accepted Russia's obligations under these treaties as successor to the Soviet Union.

=== 2001 to present ===
Ostpolitik policy was dramatically shaken after 2014 as Russia threatened Ukraine, seized Crimea, and sponsored fighting in eastern Ukraine bordering on civil war. Berlin denounced Moscow's actions as a violation of international law, and took a leadership role in formulating EU sanctions. However, Germany depends heavily on Russian energy supplies via the Nord Stream 1 pipeline, so it has proceeded cautiously and opposed American efforts to cancel Nord Stream.

Longstanding close relations with the United States flourished especially under the Obama Administration (2009–2017). In 2016 President Barack Obama hailed Chancellor Angela Merkel as his “closest international partner.” However relations worsened dramatically during the first Trump administration (2017–2021), especially regarding NATO funding, trade, tariffs, and Germany's energy dependence upon Russia.

In 2021 talks and meetings with Merkel and other European leaders, President Joe Biden spoke of bilateral relations, bolstering transatlantic relations through NATO and the European Union, and closely coordinating on key issues, such as Iran, China, Russia, Afghanistan, climate change, the COVID-19 pandemic and multilateral organizations. In early February 2021, Biden froze the Trump administration's withdrawal of 9,500 troops from U.S. military bases in Germany. Biden's freeze was welcomed by Berlin, which said that the move "serves European and transatlantic security and hence is in our mutual interest."

Merkel met Biden in Washington on July 15, 2021, with an agenda covering COVID-19 pandemic, global warming and economic issues. Trump's opposition to the $11 billion Nord Stream 2 gas pipeline remains an unsettled issue under Biden, with Merkel and Biden agreeing to disagree on the issue.

After Russia's Feb. 24 invasion of Ukraine in 2022, Germany's previous foreign policy towards Russia (traditional Ostpolitik) has been severely criticized for having been too credulous and soft.

== See also ==
- Foreign relations of Germany
  - History of Germany
  - International relations, 1648–1814
    - International relations of the Great Powers (1814–1919)
    - Diplomatic history of World War I
    - International relations (1919–1939)
    - Diplomatic history of World War II
    - Cold War
      - Wandel durch Handel
  - France–Germany relations
    - Germany–Hungary relations
    - Germany–Israel relations
    - Germany–Italy relations
    - Germany–Japan relations
    - Germany–Netherlands relations
    - Germany–Poland relations
    - Germany–Russia relations
    - Germany–Turkey relations
    - Germany–Ukraine relations
    - Germany–United Kingdom relations
    - Germany–United States relations
