= Marius Grinius =

Canadian foreign service officer

- Military career
- Allegiance: Canada
- Branch: Canadian Forces
- Service years: 1967-1979
- Awards: Canadian Forces' Decoration (CD)
- Other work: Foreign Service (1979 - 2012)

Marius Grinius is a Canadian foreign service officer and former soldier. Grinius served in the Canadian Forces from 1967-1979 as a member of the Royal Regiment Canadian Artillery. He then joined the Canadian Foreign Service where he served until his retirement in 2012.

== Career ==
Grinius joined the Canadian Forces in 1967. He graduated from the Royal Military College of Canada in 1971. After having served in 5eRALC (CFB Valcartier), attended the Long Gunnery Staff Course (Guided Weapons) at the Royal School of Artillery in Larkhill, UK, instructed at the Combat Arms School (CFB Gagetown) and served as a staff officer in HQ Canadian Forces Europe in Lahr, West Germany from 1971 to 1979, Grinius joined the Canadian foreign service in 1979. He has served abroad in Bangkok (twice), Brussels (NATO), Hanoi and again in Hanoi from 1997 to 1999 as Ambassador to Vietnam. He served in the Arms Control and Disarmament Division, and later, as the Director of the Asia Pacific South Relations Division and the Southeast Asia Division, at Foreign Affairs headquarters in Ottawa.

Grinius transferred to the Privy Council Office (PCO) in 1999, where he served in the Social Development Policy Secretariat. He was subsequently appointed Director General of the Western Economic Diversification Canada. Returning to the PCO, he served as the Director of the Operations, Security and Intelligence Secretariat from 2002 to 2004. He was Ambassador to the Republic of Korea from 2004 to 2007 and concurrently to the Democratic People's Republic of Korea from 2005 to 2007.

Grinius was the Ambassador and Canada's Permanent Representative to the Office of the United Nations and to the United Nations Conference on Disarmament in Geneva (2007–2011). He returned to Ottawa in 2011 where he was seconded to the Department of National Defence as Director-General, International Security Policy for a year. He retired on November 8, 2012 after 45 years of service to Canada. Grinius is a Fellow at the Canadian Defence and Foreign Affairs Institute.

He has experience in arms control, and has visited Pyongyang to stress Canada's calls for North Korea to halt its nuclear weapons program. He has called for Canada to engage more with North Korea, encouraging more diplomatic visits to Pyongyang to learn more about what is happening and to "build credibility" with China.
