= Jack Mintz =

Canadian economist

- Occupations: Economist, professor

Academic background
- Education: University of Alberta (BA), Queen's University (MA), University of Essex (PhD)

Jack Mintz is a Canadian economist and academic.

== Early life and education ==
Mintz earned a Bachelor of Arts degree in economics from the University of Alberta in 1973, a Master of Arts degree in economics from Queen's University in 1974, and a PhD in economics from the University of Essex in 1980.

== Career ==
From 1978 to 1989, Mintz held the position as a professor in Queen's University's economics department, before serving as Professor of Business Economics at the University of Toronto's Rotman School of Management from 1989 to 2007. During this time, he also was the president and CEO of the think tank, the CD Howe Institute, from 1999 to 2006. He was the Palmer Chair at the University of Calgary's School of Public Policy from 2008 until 2015, when he became President’s Fellow of the School of Public Policy.

Mintz chaired the federal government's Technical Committee on Business Taxation in 1996 and 1997, which led to corporate tax reform in Canada since 2000. He served as Vice-President and chair of the Social Sciences and Humanities Research Council from 2012 to 2018. He chaired the Alberta Premier's Economic Recovery Council from March 2020 to July 2022.

Mintz became a member of the Order of Canada in 2015 and received the Queen Elizabeth Diamond Jubilee Medal in 2012 for service to the Canadian tax policy community.

He has served on corporate boards including Imperial Oil Limited, Brookfield Asset Management (2002-2012), and Morneau Shepell (2010-2020).

Mintz is also a weekly columnist to the Financial Post and a member of International Tax and Public Finance's editorial board. He serves on the board of the Aristotle Foundation for Public Policy.

=== Research interests ===
Mintz has mainly focused on the public policy strand of economics, particularly tax policy.

== Published works ==
- Who Pays the Piper?: Canada's Social Policy (1995)
- Capital Mobility And Tax Competition
- Moment of Truth: How to Think About Alberta's Future (2020)
