= Weltpolitik =

Imperialist foreign policy of the German Empire

Weltpolitik (German: [ˈvɛltpoliˌtiːk], "world politics") was the imperialist foreign policy adopted by the German Empire during the reign of Kaiser Wilhelm II. The aim of the policy was to transform Germany into a global power. Though considered a logical consequence of the German unification by a broad spectrum of Wilhelmine society, it marked a decisive break with the defensive Realpolitik of the Bismarckian era.

The origins of the policy can be traced to a Reichstag debate on 6 December 1897 during which German Foreign Secretary Bernhard von Bülow stated, "in one word: We wish to throw no one into the shade, but we also demand our own place in the sun." (Mit einem Worte: wir wollen niemand in den Schatten stellen, aber wir verlangen auch unseren Platz an der Sonne).

Nancy Mitchell says that the creation of Weltpolitik was a change in the appliance of German foreign policy. Up until Wilhelm's dismissal of Otto von Bismarck, Germany had concentrated its efforts on stopping the possibility of a two-front war in Europe. Prior to Weltpolitik, there was a greater focus on using its army and subtle diplomacy to maintain its status. In particular, Bismarck had initially been wary of acquiring overseas colonies and wished to reserve the role of Germany as an "honest broker" in continental affairs, though the 1878 Congress of Berlin had revealed the limits of his mediation.

However, despite Bismarck's initial scepticism, the foundations of the German colonial empire were already laid during his tenure from 1884 onwards, when the government began to place the privately acquired properties of colonisers like Adolf Lüderitz, Adolph Woermann, Carl Peters, and Clemens Denhardt under the protection of the German Empire, necessitating costly action such as in the 1888 Abushiri revolt. According to German historian Hans-Ulrich Wehler, German colonial policy in the 1880s was an example of a "pragmatic" social imperialism, a device that allowed the government to distract public attention from domestic problems and preserve the existing social and political order.

Under Weltpolitik, despite a two-front war still being at the forefront of Germany's concerns as proven through the Schlieffen Plan, Wilhelm II was far more ambitious. Colonial policies officially became a matter of national prestige, promoted by pressure groups like the Pan-German League; in the ongoing Scramble for Africa, Germany was a latecomer and had to stand firm to catch up. However, only relatively small acquisitions were made, such as Kiautschou Bay and Neukamerun, whereas Wilhelm's support for a policy of colonisation was shown in his Kruger telegram in 1896 and response to the Venezuelan crisis of 1902–1903. Colonial ambitions were further reflected in the Herero and Nama genocide from 1904 onwards and the suppression of the Maji Maji Rebellion from 1907, as well as in the First and Second Moroccan Crisis of 1905 and 1911.

The Anglo-German naval arms race was likely lost when Germany failed to keep up with the British after the advent of dreadnought battleships from 1906 onwards; with the Anglo-Russian Convention and the Triple Entente of 1907, Weltpolitik showed itself unable to forestall the threat of a two-front war. The policy's ultimate failure would be sealed in the First World War.
