= Centre for Military, Security and Strategic Studies =

Canadian military research centre

The Centre for Military, Security and Strategic Studies (CMSS) is an interdisciplinary research centre at the University of Calgary focusing on military, defence and security issues, established in 1999. CMSS' mission is to promote and develop excellence in military, security and defence studies.

== History ==
The Strategic Studies Program was established in 1981. It is part of the Department of National Defence's former nationwide network of Security and Defence Forum (SDF) research Centres, a network of Centres specializing in defence and security studies across Canada. It was renamed the Centre for Military and Strategic Studies in 1999.

In November 2015, the Centre changed its name to include Security as a way to reflect the centre's increasingly diverse research focus. CMSS is part of the Faculty of Arts at the University of Calgary, draws from external departments such as Political Science, History, Economics, Anthropology, and Geomatics.

In June 2022, UCalgary announced that the PhD program was temporarily halted due to dropping number of applicants since 2015.

In October 2022, it was reported that alleged Russian spy Jose Assis Giammaria studied at the CMSS in a course-based Masters program and graduated in 2018.

== Programs ==
CMSS is a graduate-level program, currently offering four degrees: MSS thesis-based, MSS course-based, MSS Co-op, and PhD. An application to hold a formal PhD program within CMSS was approved by the University of Calgary Faculty of Social Science. (Now Faculty of Arts) The Masters program is currently completed by thesis, course work or co-op. Masters in Military and Strategic Studies (MSS) thesis-based is a two-year program consisting of one year of seminar and lecture courses, and a second year of thesis writing and defence; whereas, course-based students complete a second year of seminar study. The Co-op program for Master's students differs in that they work in a security and defence related job for eight months of their second year.

Research conducted at the Centre by both faculty and graduate students is broad. Recent research has included work on Canadian military studies, civil-military relations, unconventional warfare, ethics and morality in conflict, Arctic sovereignty, domestic/hemispheric security, peacebuilding, naval history, strategic thought, Israel security studies and U.S. policy and politics.

=== Partners ===
The Centre is partners with the University of Calgary School of Public Policy and the Canadian Defence and Foreign Affairs Institute. CMSS also has a collaborative relationship with the University of Calgary's Institute for Security, Privacy and Information Assurance (ISPIA) and has an exchange program with the Helmut Schmidt University in Hamburg, Germany. CMSS is affiliated with the Canadian Forces, Department of National Defence, the Arctic Institute of North America, and the Calgary business community.

== Publications ==
The Centre for Military, Security and Strategic Studies sponsors the online Journal of Military and Strategic Studies, which publishes four issues per year. The mandate of this open access and peer reviewed publication, is to encourage the creation of original scholarship in strategic and military studies, to disseminate this material to an academic and professional audience, and to provide a forum for the discussion of Canadian security issues.

CMSS also publishes international conference proceedings, books by fellows and the Calgary Papers in Military and Strategic Studies.

== Senior research fellows ==
- David J. Bercuson, Director CMSS
- Robert Huebert, Associate Director CMSS
- Holger H. Herwig, Canada Research Chair - Military and Strategic Studies
- James Keeley, Graduate Program Director
- Stephen J. Randall
- Terry Terriff
- David Wright
- Alexander A. Hill
- Gavin Cameron
- Barry Cooper
- Maureen Hiebert
- Pablo Policzer
- John R. Ferris
- Sabrina Peric, CDFAI Chair
- Patrick H. Brennan
- Jean-Sébastien Rioux
- Paul James Stortz
- Timothy Stapleton

== See also ==
- Canadian Institute of Strategic Studies
