= Canadian Global Affairs Institute =

Canadian research institute

- Canadian Global Affairs Institute
- Abbreviation: CGAI
- Formation: 2001
- Founded at: Calgary, Alberta
- Type: Research Institute, Think Tank
- Purpose: To be a catalyst for innovative Canadian global engagement
- Headquarters: Calgary, Alberta and Ottawa, Ontario
- Website: www.cgai.ca
- Formerly called: Canadian Defence and Foreign Affairs Institute

The Canadian Global Affairs Institute (CGAI) is an independent, non-partisan research institute based in Calgary with an office in Ottawa. Incorporated as a charitable organization in 2001, CGAI seeks to focus the national debate and understanding of Canada's international policies, with the ultimate aim of ensuring a more globally engaged Canada.

CGAI provides insight into the international challenges and opportunities facing Canada in the areas of defence, diplomacy, development, security, international trade and global governance.

CGAI's mission is to enhance recognition of Canada’s important role in the international community and to promote Canada’s active and effective involvement in all international forums. The institute is dedicated to educating Canadians, particularly those who have leadership roles in shaping Canadian foreign policy, about the importance of Canada being proactive in world affairs with tangible diplomatic, military, and aid assets. CGAI believes that doing so enhances Canadian security and prosperity.

== About ==
CGAI began in Calgary, Alberta, in 2001 as the Canadian Defence & Foreign Affairs Institute (CDFAI) with a mandate to promote and inform government and the public about the value of a strong international Canadian presence. In 2010, CGAI opened an Ottawa, Ontario, office to reach out to parliamentarians, senior policy makers and the diplomatic service.

The Institute's research is created by staff and fellows, comprising a diverse group of practitioners and academics throughout Canada and abroad. Program guidance is provided by an advisory council made up of a cross-section of former politicians, senior retired civil servants, retired general officers and academics. The Institute is governed by a board of experienced corporate directors, while a team of staff split between Calgary and Ottawa manages the day-to-day operations.

=== Vision ===
The Institute’s vision is to become indispensable to the government, media, business and civil society, both in Canada and abroad, in terms of global policy analysis.

=== Mission ===
CGAI’s mission is to identify Canadian global interests and to promote Canada’s active and effective involvement in the international arena. This is pursued through the production of authoritative, relevant and rigorous public policy analysis, and the dissemination of this strategic analysis to Canadian policy-makers and the public.

== Current Activities ==
The Institute conducts research on current and critical international issues relevant to Canada, including topics of defence, development, diplomacy, security, international law, trade, natural resource management and global governance. This is achieved by promoting and disseminating written, audio and video publications, hosting speaker events and providing expert commentary to the media.

=== Weekly Podcasts ===
==== The Global Exchange Podcast ====
The Global Exchange podcast is a weekly conversation focused on bringing listeners comprehensive analysis and commentary on a variety of world issues, including foreign policy, trade, and development issues. Host Colin Robertson guides listeners through the various challenges confronting Canadian foreign policymakers.

==== Defence Deconstructed Podcast ====
The Defence Deconstructed podcast is a weekly conversation with host David Perry engaging various defence experts and officials on the pressing defence and security issues Canada faces today and tomorrow. Defence Deconstructed is released every Friday.

==== Energy Security Cubed Podcast ====
The Energy Security Cubed podcast is a weekly conversation with hosts Kelly Ogle and Joe Calnan engaging various experts and officials to discuss the three pillars of energy security – energy, economics and the environment. Energy Security Cubed is released weekly on Thursdays.

==== The Event Edit Podcast ====
“The Event Edit,” is released every Tuesday over the Summer. This podcast comprises recordings from events organized by CGAI throughout the year.

=== Roundtable Events ===
Each year, CGAI hosts several dozen roundtable speaker events based on specific topics of importance to Canadian defence, security, and foreign affairs. The roundtables are held in Calgary, Montreal, Toronto, and Ottawa, and bring together businesspeople, academics, and practitioners to listen to some of Canada's most important and influential thinkers. Former speakers include Peter MacKay, Minister of National Defence; Michael Bell, former diplomat; and Yuen Pau Woo, president and CEO of the Asia Pacific Foundation of Canada, among others.

=== Conferences ===
CGAI hosts various conferences in Ottawa around critical issues in Canadian defence, trade, security, resources, and foreign policy. These conferences consistently attract high-calibre speakers, key policy makers, prominent academics, and a large number of the interested public.

Conferences are core components in the pursuit of the Institute's vision. By gathering prominent Canadian policy-makers, business leaders, academics and bureaucrats, CGAI conveys and exchanges ideas about Canada’s evolving role in the world as well as bolster debate and analysis of Canadian policy options.

=== Publications ===
CGAI sponsors publications that are written and developed with the intent of promoting public dialogue on issues affecting Canada’s policies in the areas of foreign affairs, including defence, security, trade policy, natural resources, international law, migration and global governance.

=== Policy Papers ===
The analysis and recommendations produced in these papers and the ideas they articulate are a key component of the Canadian Global Affairs Institute. All policy papers undergo a double-blind peer review process to ensure unbiased methodological and conceptual evaluation. Policy papers are longer, more in-depth bodies of work that afford the authors a chance to thoroughly examine a topic, analyzing research and providing a recommended course of action.

=== Policy Perspectives ===
Policy Perspectives are a middle ground between research intensive Policy Papers and brief but topical op-eds and commentary. These papers allow the CGAI to respond in a timely manner to a wide range of topics associated with the dynamic global environment. Similar to Policy Papers, Policy Perspectives are subject to rigorous review to ensure high quality research and analysis, however, to ensure timely distribution they do not undergo a double-blind review. They are produced by CGAI fellows, staff and other subject matter experts and cover a wide range of topics, reflective of the Institute’s breadth of expertise.

=== Primers ===
CGAI Primers are an occasional publication series that provides overviews of individual topics or upcoming international events. Like CGAI's policy papers, Primers undergo internal review before publication.

=== Triple Helix ===
Triple Helix is a network composed of the CGAI, the Norman Paterson School of International Affairs (NPSIA) at Carleton University, and industry that will explore how a range of emerging technologies intersect with defence.

Directed by Dr. David Perry (CGAI), Dr. Alex Wilner (NPSIA), and Michael Petric, Triple Helix is a hub that:

- thinks creatively about emerging technology;
- links developments therein to Canadian defence strategy, policy, and planning;
- facilitates the establishment of a pan-Canadian research across academia, think tanks, and industry dedicated to promoting research excellence; and,
- develops working relationships with researchers, practitioners, and industry in Five Eyes countries in order to draw international lessons for Canada on how allied states are applying emerging technologies to their own defence priorities and needs.

The objective of Triple Helix is to provide an empirically driven and practically oriented guide on the interplay between technology, innovation, security, defence, and policy useful to Canadian policymakers and private sector actors alike, as well as to identify paths to and foster greater cooperation between government, academia, think tanks and industry in the areas of emerging technologies and innovation.

Four overarching and related research questions animate Triple Helix's network:

1. First, what is the impact of emerging technologies on force development with respect to connected battlespace?
2. Second, what policy instruments and cooperation mechanisms exist to support allied military interoperability and connectivity among defence coalitions?
3. Third, how do emerging communications and related space and cyber technologies, including synthetic environments, effect both the public and the defence sector, and how can these enhanced capabilities participate in shaping a global, dispersed, and resilient connected battlespace?
4. And fourth, how do these technologies, policy instruments and enhanced capabilities strengthen continental defence?

To date, there is very little Canadian transdisciplinary scholarship that spans academia, public policy, and industry on any of these research questions. Triple Helix seeks to close that gap.

The research outputs of Triple Helix look to respond to three central defence policy challenges: “Emerging Technologies and Military Application,” “Cyber, Space and Information as Operational Domains,” and “Securing North America and Enhancing Continental Defence.”

Diversity, equity and inclusion, the principles of Gender-Based Analysis Plus (GBA+), as well as building the next generation of defence professionals, guide Triple Helix's operations, activities, and outputs.

=== CGAI-WiDS Fellowship Award ===
CGAI partners with Women in Defence & Security (WiDs) to offer a professional development fellowship. This opportunity aims to advance the careers of women in defence and security by offering one or more women mentorship, work and research/analysis opportunities with CGAI, access to our publications and resources. This collaboration selects female graduate or post-graduate students, using the WiDS Annual Memorial Scholarship Process.

=== Committee Testimony ===
Being experts in their specific fields, CGAI Fellows and Advisory Council members are consistently called upon by House of Commons and Senate committees to give expert testimony on a given subject of parliamentary study.

== Past Activities ==
=== The Dispatch ===
The Canadian Global Affairs Institute produced a quarterly newsletter called The Dispatch. The Dispatch invited CGAI fellows to provide insight on international issues of relevance to Canada.

=== Strategic Studies Working Group ===
The Strategic Studies Working Group (SSWG) was a partnership between CGAI and the Canadian International Council (CIC), which incorporated the former Canadian Institute of Strategic Studies. The SSWG was administered by CGAI, which also conducted research and produced publications on security and defence issues on behalf of the partnership. All projects undertaken by the SSWG were first approved by CIC and were co-published or co e-published according to CIC standards.

The SSWG began to host e-conferences on issues related to defence and security. These e-conferences took place over a number of weeks, with each week dedicated to a specific topic. The e-conferences included regular commentaries by academics and practitioners, Twitter Q&As, live chats and major articles published in national media.

- The "Future of Fighting" conference focused on how the Canadian Forces might evolve in the coming decade to reflect the changing funding and combat environment.
- The "Drone Week" conference was focused on understanding some of the practical, legal and moral questions surrounding the current and future use of drones and other unmanned aerial vehicles.

The SSWG produced research papers which keep in line with the partnership's purpose of focusing on defence and security topics. The Strategic Profile Canada was a project which provides a comprehensive overview of Canada's demographic, economic and military information.

=== 3Ds Blog ===
The 3Ds Blog was a site managed by CGAI which provided defence and security news from Canada and around the world. Blog updates were made by CGAI fellows, the majority coming from Mark Collins.

=== Ross Munro Award ===
The Ross Munro Media Award was initiated, in 2002, by the Conference of Defence Associations in concert with CGAI. It was awarded annually to recognize one Canadian journalist who made a significant and outstanding contribution to the general public's understanding of Canada's defence and security issues.

=== Military Journalism Course ===
The Military Journalism Course was started in 2002 as a nine-day course, which introduced university students to military journalism and the Canadian Armed Forces. The course was run in partnership with the Centre for Military and Strategic Studies at the University of Calgary and included a combination of media-military theory in a classroom setting, coupled with field visits to Armed Forces regular and reserve units. The stated goal of the program was to enhance the military education of future Canadian journalists who will report on Canadian military activities domestically and abroad. In 2007, the program introduced its first Francophone Military Journalism course held at the Université de Montréal and Canadian Forces Base Valcartier, near Québec City.

== People ==
=== Board of Directors ===
- Laura Dawson
- Gillian McCormack
- Kelly J. Ogle
- David Perry
- Craig Stewart
- Ian Wild (Chair)

=== Fellows ===
- Chris Ayotte
- Ken Barker
- John Barrett
- Peter G. Bates
- Stewart Beck
- Dani Belo
- David Bercuson, OC, FRSC
- Kevin Birn
- Mike Blanchfield
- Steve Bowes
- Maureen Boyd
- Brett Boudreau
- Gregory Brew
- Kerry Buck
- Joe Calnan
- Philip Calvert
- David Carment
- Joseph Caron
- Andrea Charron
- Jan Top Christensen
- Luiza Ch. Savage
- Scott Clancy
- Claire Citeau
- Julie Clark
- Michael Cleland
- Yvan Cliche
- Howard Coombs
- Nicole Covey
- Kristen Csenkey
- Afton David
- D. Michael Day
- Glenn Davidson
- Francisco Suarez Davila
- Ferry de Kerckhove
- Charlotte Duval-Lantoine
- Peter Donolo
- Dur-e-Aden
- Judith Fabian
- James Fergusson
- Ross Fetterly
- Patricia Fortier
- Julian Lindley-French
- Jonathan Fried
- Monica Gattinger
- Allison Gifford
- Emily Gilfillan
- John Gilmour
- Sarah Goldfeder
- Frank Graves
- Marius Grinius
- John Gruetzner
- Robert Hage
- Benjamin Hautecouverture
- Darren Hawco
- Lawrence Herman
- Roger Hilton
- Jacquie Hoornweg
- Deanna Horton
- Rob Huebert
- Jaeho Hwang
- Joseph Ingram
- Rory Johnston
- Thomas Juneau
- Trevor Kennedy
- Tom Keenan
- Julie Kim
- Brian Kingston
- Jeffrey Kucharski
- Philippe Lagassé, PhD
- Adam Lajeunesse
- Eugene Lang
- Meredith Lilly
- Ted Lipman
- Ron Lloyd
- Abbey MacDonald
- Dennis McConaghy
- Ian Mack
- Paul Maddison
- Aditi Malhotra
- Michael Munulak
- Randolph Mank
- Solange Marquez
- Brendan Marshall
- Barbara Martin
- Pascale Massot
- Eric Miller
- Marcia Mills
- Vina Nadjibulla
- Stephen R. Nagu
- Mark Norman
- Richard Norris
- Roy Norton
- Cleo Paskal
- John Parisella
- David Perry
- George Petrolekas
- Jeffrey Phillips
- Taras Prodaniuk
- Bahman Radnejad
- Andrew Rasiulis
- William Richardson
- Tom Ring
- Kari Roberts
- Chris W. J. Roberts
- Colin Robertson
- Alexander Rudolph
- Amrita Sen
- Swaran Singh
- Elinor Sloan
- Hugh Stephens
- Al Stephenson
- John Stewart
- Scott Stevenson
- Craig Stone
- Jeff Tasseron
- Denis Thompson
- Katherine Todd
- Laurie Trautman
- James Trottier
- Heidi Tworek
- Sara Vakhshouri
- Adriana Vega
- Stéfanie von Hlatky
- Christopher Waddell
- Ellen Wald
- Ron R. Wallace
- Kelly Williams
- Alex Wilner
- David Curtis Wright

=== Notable alumni ===
- John Adams
- Stuart Beare
- Perrin Beatty, PC
- Bob Bergen, PhD
- Serge Bertrand
- Christopher Bishop
- Robert Booth, QC
- Yves Brodeur
- George Brookman
- Derek Burney, OC
- Gavin Cameron, PhD
- Aurélie Campana, PhD
- Joseph Caron
- Timothy Choi
- HE David Collins
- Mark Collins
- Jocelyn Coulon
- LGen (ret’d) (Hon) Romeo Dallaire, OC, CMM, GOQ, MSC, CD
- Neil Desai
- Paul Dewar
- Don Douglas
- Paul Durand
- Mark Entwistle PhD
- James Fergusson, PhD
- John Ferris, PhD
- Tom Flanagan, PhD, CM, FRSC
- Brian Flemming, CM, QC, DCL
- Bob Fowler
- Robert Gibson CLJ, MMLJ
- Andrew Godefroy, CD
- Jack L. Granatstein, OC
- Rudyard Griffiths, MA
- Robert Hamilton
- Peter Harder MA, LLD
- Frank Harvey
- Natasha Hassan
- Dan Hays
- Raymond Henault
- Sharon Hobson
- Col (Ret’d) Bernd Horn OMM, MSM, CD
- Anne Irwin, PhD
- Tami Jacoby, PhD
- Mike Jeffery, CMM, CD
- Brian Job, PhD
- Whitney Lackenbauer
- Eric Lerhe, PhD
- Andrew Leslie, CMM, MSC, MSM, CD
- Stephen Letwin, B.Sc, MBA, LGA
- Natalia Loukacheva, PhD
- Sheila M. McIntosh
- George Macdonald
- David McLaughlin
- Anne McGrath
- Ken MacDougall BGen (ret’d)
- Don Macnamara
- Candice Malcolm
- Gen (ret’d) Paul Manson, OC, CMM, CD
- Pierre Martin, PhD
- Michael Mears
- Sarah Jane Meharg, PhD
- BGen (Ret'd) Robert S. Millar
- Jack Mintz
- Alexander Moens, PhD
- Robert Nicolay, MBA, ICD.D
- HE John Noble
- Roland Paris
- David Pratt
- Bob Rae
- Stephen Randall, FRSC
- Roy Rempel
- MGen (Ret’d) Cameron Ross, CMM, CD
- Stéphane Roussel, PhD
- Ralph Sawyer, PhD
- Robin Sears
- Michael Shaw
- Darren Schemmer
- Hugh Segal
- Gordon Smith, PhD
- Denis Stairs, OC, PhD, FRSC
- Gilbert W. Taylor
- Brad Wall
- Charity Weeden
- John Weekes
- Margaret Wente
- Chris Westdal
- Rob Wright
- Marie-Joëlle Zahar

== Recognition ==
Fellows regularly provide commentary and analysis of ongoing international events in TV and print media. CGAI Vice-President Colin Robertson was named in Embassy Magazine's 2012 ranking of the "Top 80 Influencing Canada Foreign Policy". The University of Pennsylvania has consistently ranked CGAI highly on its list of top think tanks in Canada.

== Criticism and Controversy ==
In an article from July 2016, The Globe and Mail examined the Institute's support of Canada's $15-billion combat-vehicle sale to Saudi Arabia at a time of a humanitarian crisis in Yemen, and the think tank's acceptance of donations from defense contractor General Dynamics - the parent of the arms maker in the export contract.

An article in 2017 from The Huffington Post goes on to say about the Saudi arms deal: "At least four of the General Dynamics-funded institute's "fellows" wrote columns justifying the sale, including an opinion Perry published in The Globe and Mail Report on Business titled "Without foreign sales, Canada's defence industry would not survive."
