= Kingsland, Calgary =

Kingsland
- Neighbourhood
- Location of Kingsland in Calgary
- Coordinates: 50°59′24″N 114°04′42″W
- Country: Canada
- Province: Alberta
- City: Calgary
- Quadrant: SW
- Ward: 11
- Established: 1957
- Annexed: 1956

Government
  - Mayor: Jeromy Farkas
  - Administrative body: Calgary City Council
  - Councillor: Rob Ward (Communities First)

Area
  - Total: 1.4 km^{2} (0.54 sq mi)
- Elevation: 1,060 m (3,480 ft)

Population (2006)
  - Total: 4,495
  - Average Income: $43,647
- Website: Kingsland Community Association

Kingsland is a residential neighbourhood in the southwest quadrant of Calgary, Alberta. It is bounded to the north by Glenmore Trail, to the east by Macleod Trail, to the south by Heritage Drive and to the west by Elbow Drive.

The area was annexed to the City of Calgary in 1956 and Kingsland was established in 1957. It is represented in the Calgary City Council by the Ward 11 councillor.

== Demographics ==
In the City of Calgary's 2021 municipal census, Kingsland had a population of 4,900 living in 2,375 dwellings. With a land area of 1.3 km^{2} (0.50 sq mi), it had a population density of 3,770/km^{2} (9,800/sq mi) in 2021.

Residents in this community had a median household income of $68,000 in 2021, and there were 15% low income residents living in Kingsland. As of 2021, 33% of the residents were immigrants. A proportion of 54.1% of the buildings were condominiums or apartments, and 68% of the housing was used for renting. 31% of residents in Kingsland spent 30%+ income on housing, compared to the Calgary average of 23%.

Pop. Overtime
Year	Population
2014	4812
2015	4733
2016	4699
2017	4667
2018	4645
2019	4688
2021	4900

== Crime ==
In the May 2023-May 2024 data period, Kingsland had a crime rate of 4.796/100, an increase from the previous data period.

This puts it at this comparison to other Calgary communities: Saddle Ridge (1.358/100), Whitehorn (1.741/100), Rundle (2.342/100), Brentwood (2.348/100), Acadia (2.542/100), Bowness (2.934/100), Shawnessy (3.296/100), Inglewood (3.438/100), Kingsland (3.592/100), Sunnyside (3.650/100), Marlborough (4.703/100), Southwood (5.147/100), Sunalta (5.307/100), Montgomery (5.483/100), Forest Lawn (6.528/100), Rosscarrock (7.049/100), Downtown Commercial Core (12.705/100), Downtown East Village (15.605/100), Manchester (43.368/100).

=== Crime data by year ===
Crime Data
Year	Crime Rate (/100)
2018	4.3
2019	6.9
2020	4.4
2021	3.6
2022	4.1
2023	3.2

== Education ==
The community is served by St. Augustine Elementary & Junior High (Catholic).

== See also ==
- List of neighbourhoods in Calgary
