= Seton, Calgary =

Seton
- Neighbourhood
- Location of Seton in Calgary
- Coordinates: 50°52′44.40″N 113°57′08.89″W
- Country: Canada
- Province: Alberta
- City: Calgary
- Quadrant: SE
- Ward: 12
- Established: 2018
- Annexed: 1983

Government
  - Mayor: Jeromy Farkas
  - Administrative body: Calgary City Council
  - Councillor: Mike Jamieson (A Better Calgary)
- Postal code: T3M

Seton is a suburban residential/commercial/institutional community under construction in southeast Calgary, Alberta, Canada. It is located directly south of Auburn Bay and east of Cranston. Its boundaries are presently Deerfoot Trail to the west, Seton Blvd. to the north, and an extension of 52 St. S.E. to the east. Its southern boundary is defined by a proposed unnamed arterial road. The community is currently represented on Calgary City Council by the Ward 12 councillor.

Seton was established in 2018 however construction began on some amenities several years prior, when completed, will include a mixture of residential and business development, and will be served by a proposed southeast leg of the city's C-Train system, also known as the Green Line. Seton is home to the 44-acre (180,000 m^{2}) South Health Campus, a major hospital for the Calgary Region, which opened in 2011.

== Demographics ==
According to the 2019 civic census, Seton had a population of 1,134 residents in 973 dwellings.

== Crime ==
In the May 2023-May 2024 data period, Seton had a crime rate of 5.348/100, an increase from the previous data period.

This puts it at this comparison to other Calgary communities: Saddle Ridge (1.358/100), Whitehorn (1.741/100), Rundle (2.342/100), Brentwood (2.348/100), Acadia (2.542/100), Bowness (2.934/100), Shawnessy (3.296/100), Inglewood (3.438/100), Sunnyside (3.650/100), Marlborough (4.703/100), Southwood (5.147/100), Sunalta (5.307/100), Seton (5.348/100), Montgomery (5.483/100), Forest Lawn (6.528/100), Rosscarrock (7.049/100), Downtown Commercial Core (12.705/100), Downtown East Village (15.605/100), Manchester (43.368/100).

=== Crime data by year ===
Crime Data
| Year | Crime Rate |
|---|---|
| 2018 | 1.3 /100 |
| 2019 | 2.6 /100 |
| 2020 | 2.2 /100 |
| 2021 | 2.2 /100 |
| 2022 | 3.3 /100 |
| 2023 | 4.4 /100 |

== See also ==
- List of neighbourhoods in Calgary
