= Pineridge, Calgary =

Pineridge
- Neighbourhood
- Location of Pineridge in Calgary
- Coordinates: 51°04′27″N 113°56′48″W
- Country: Canada
- Province: Alberta
- City: Calgary
- Quadrant: NE
- Ward: 10
- Established: 1974
- Annexed: 1961

Government
  - Mayor: Jeromy Farkas
  - Administrative body: Calgary City Council
  - Councillor: Raj Dhaliwal (Independent)

Area
  - Total: 2.0 km^{2} (0.77 sq mi)
- Elevation: 1,057 m (3,468 ft)

Population (2006)
  - Total: 9,857
  - Average Income: $49,452
- Website: Pineridge Community Association

Pineridge is a neighbourhood in Northeast Calgary, Alberta, Canada, and is one of four neighbourhoods that make up what is called the Properties, along with Whitehorn, Temple, and Rundle. It is bordered by 32 Ave NE to the north, 52nd Street NE to the west, 16th Avenue NE (Highway 1 – the Trans Canada Highway) to the south, and 68th Street NE to the east.

== History ==
Pineridge was established in 1974 and was developed along with the other "Properties" communities during the building boom of the mid-1970s. Prior to that time the area was a treeless prairie landscape.

The community of Pineridge is located close to Calgary's Northeast commercial and industrial areas and major transportation routes, including the Trans-Canada Highway, Barlow Trail and Memorial Drive. The Village Square Leisure Centre is situated within the community, and the city's pathway system offers recreational opportunities for local residents.

== Demographics ==
In the City of Calgary's 2012 municipal census, Pineridge had a population of 9,644 living in 3,799 dwellings, a 0.2% increase from its 2011 population of 9,626. With a land area of 2.6 km^{2} (1.0 sq mi), it had a population density of 3,710/km^{2} (9,610/sq mi) in 2012.

Residents in this community had a median household income of $49,452 in 2000, and there were 17.9% low income residents living in the neighbourhood. As of 2000, 29.2% of the residents were immigrants. 17.5% of the buildings were condominiums or apartments, and 32.4% of the housing was used for renting.

== Crime ==
In the May 2023-May 2024 data period, Pineridge had a crime rate of 2.761/100, a decrease from the previous data period.

This puts it at this comparison to other Calgary communities: Saddle Ridge (1.358/100), Whitehorn (1.741/100), Rundle (2.342/100), Brentwood (2.348/100), Acadia (2.542/100), Pineridge (2.761/100), Bowness (2.934/100), Shawnessy (3.296/100), Inglewood (3.438/100), Sunnyside (3.650/100), Marlborough (4.703/100), Southwood (5.147/100), Sunalta (5.307/100), Montgomery (5.483/100), Forest Lawn (6.528/100), Rosscarrock (7.049/100), Downtown Commercial Core (12.705/100), Downtown East Village (15.605/100), Manchester (43.368/100).

=== Crime data by year ===
Crime Data
Year	Crime Rate (/100 pop.)
2018	4.2
2019	3.5
2020	2.9
2021	3.4
2022	3.8
2023	2.9

== Schools ==
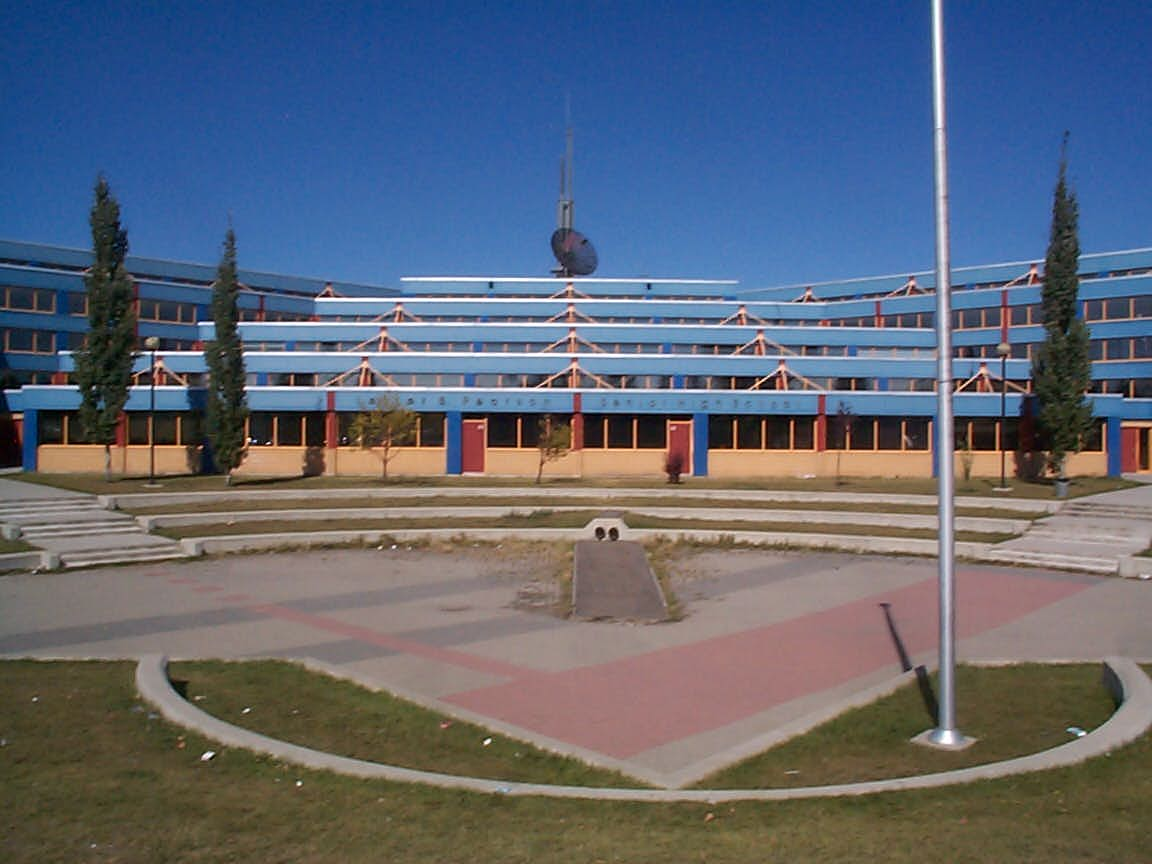
Lester B. Pearson High School

Pineridge is home to the following schools:

- Pineridge Community Preschool
- St. Patrick Elementary School (Separate)
- Douglas Harkness Elementary School (Public)
- Lester B. Pearson High School (Public)
- Pineridge Community School (Public)
- Clarence Sansom Junior High School (Public)

== Public transit ==
Pineridge is serviced by the following Calgary Transit routes (as of 24 May 2026):

- Route 23, 52 St E
- Route 34, Pineridge
- Route 48, Rundle
- Route 68, 68 St E

The nearest CTrain rapid transit station to Pineridge is Rundle Station.

== Electoral districts ==
The Pineridge community is a part of the Calgary-Northeast federal electoral district, the Calgary Cross provincial constituency. It is represented in the Calgary City Council by the Ward 10 councillor.

== See also ==
- List of neighbourhoods in Calgary
- Village Square Leisure Centre
- Lester B. Pearson High School
