= Rundle station =

Light rail station in Calgary, Alberta, Canada

Rundle
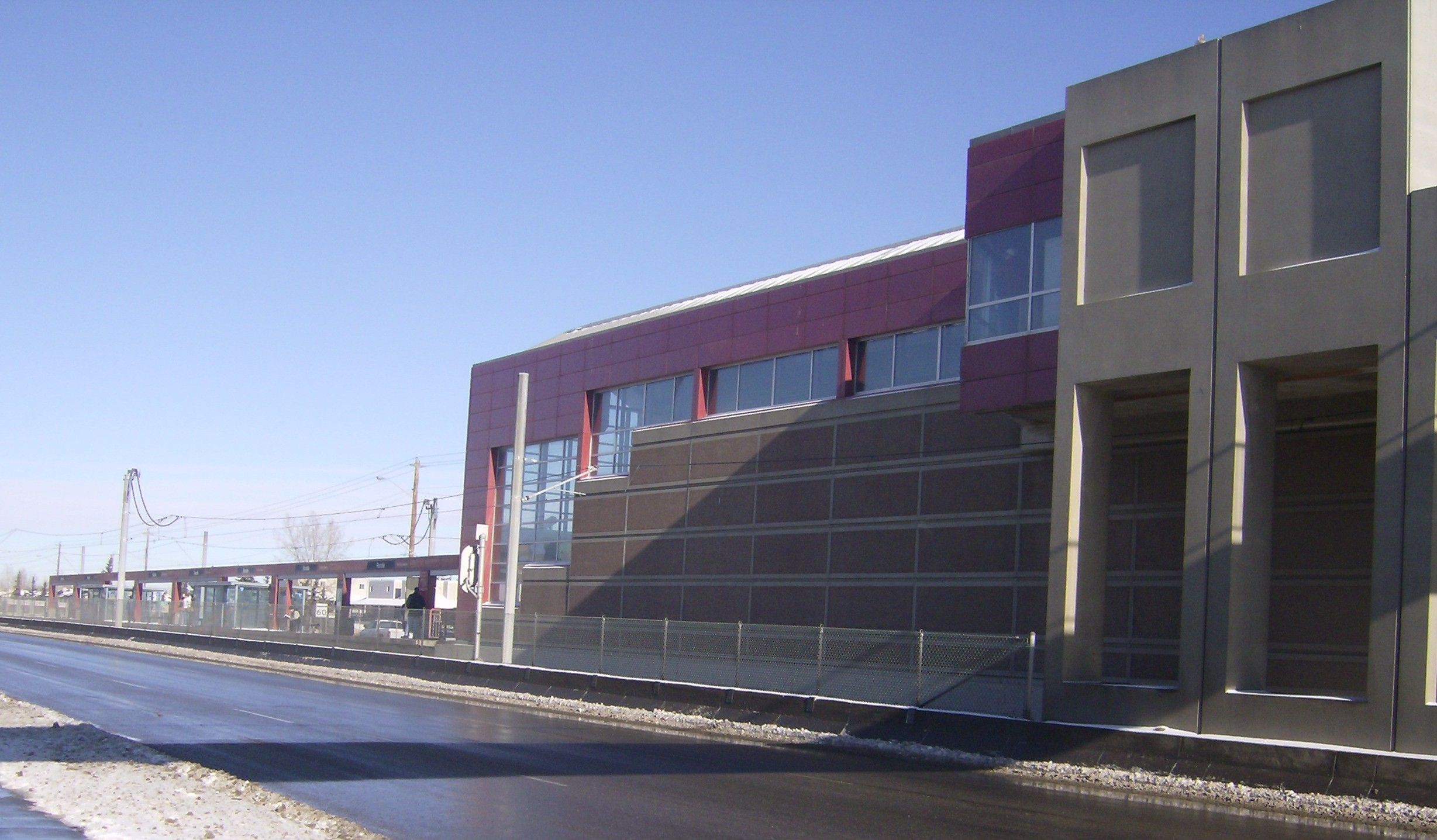

General information
- Location: 2529 - 36 Street NE
- Coordinates: 51°04′30″N 113°58′54″W
- Owner: Calgary Transit
- Platforms: Center-loading platform
- Connections: 19 16 Avenue N 32 Huntington/Sunridge; 33 Vista Heights; 34 Pineridge; 43 36 Street East; 48 Rundle; 555 Dashmesh Centre (Sundays only); MAX Orange (Saddletowne / Brentwood)

Construction
- Structure type: At-grade
- Parking: 350 spaces
- Accessible: yes

History
- Opened: 1985; 41 years ago
- Rebuilt: 2013; 13 years ago (platform extension); 2017; 9 years ago (interior renovations)

Services
Preceding station	Calgary Transit	Following station
Marlborough toward 69 Street	Blue Line	Whitehorn toward Saddletowne
Location

Rundle Station is a Calgary C-Train light rail station in the Northeast community of Rundle. It is the sixth station northeast of City Hall on the Blue Line, with Marlborough Station sitting in the southbound direction, and Whitehorn Station sitting in the northbound direction. The station opened on April 27, 1985, as part of the original Northeast Route 202 Line.

The station is located in the median of 36 Street NE, to the north of the intersection of 20 Avenue NE/Rundlehorn Drive, right in front of Sunridge Mall. The station is 8.4 km from the City Hall Interlocking. Pedestrian overpasses connect the station to both sides of 36 Street NE. Stairs, escalators, as well as an elevator provide access down to the station platform.

The station serves the community of Rundle to the east and Sunridge Mall to the west, with 350 parking spaces are included across the station premises (not including the parking on the premises of Sunridge Mall).

In 2005, the station registered and average transit of 11,600 boardings per weekday.

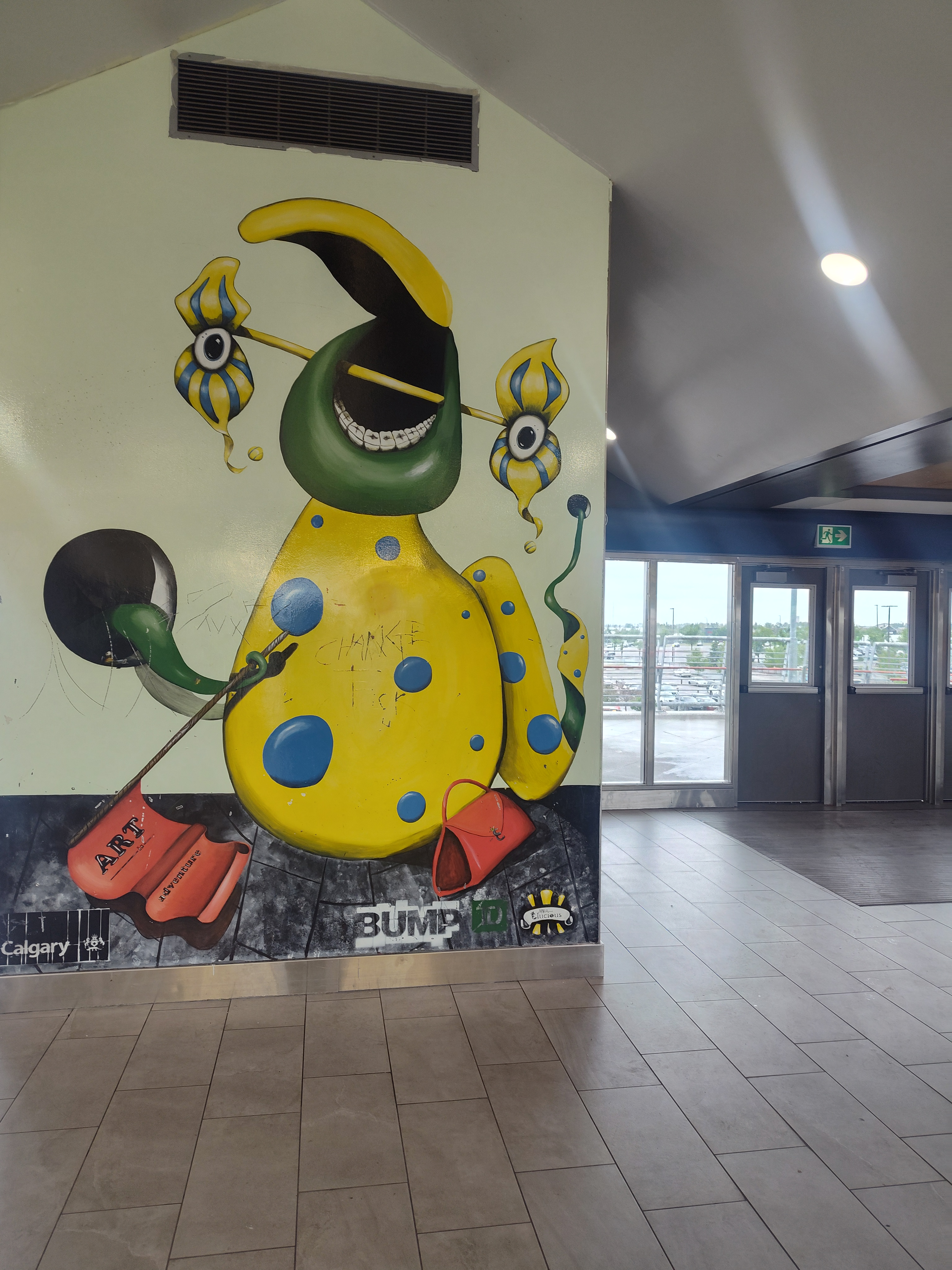
'Rundle Monster' BUMP Mural located on the interior of Rundle Station

On January 20, 1993, a 4-year-old child, Michael MacIntosh, got his jacket sleeve stuck at the bottom of the escalator after straying from his family. Bystanders helped him stay conscious until paramedics arrived and free his injured left arm, this was later seen on Rescue 911 on May 4, 1993, on CBS. Whilst the incident happened at Rundle Station, the Rescue 911 episode was actually filmed at Bridgeland/Memorial Station for the station had better lighting at the time.

== Station name ==
The station has seen minor criticism from transit advocates due to the name not being properly reflective of the area. Advocates have argued that it should reflect the Sunridge Commercial Area and that the station should be renamed to Sunridge/Rundle Station and other variations of that. It has been argued that the name is outdated and 'from a time before Sunridge was as prominent as it is today', and that is reflected with bus routes such as the 19 - Dalhousie Station / Sunridge or 32 - Huntington / Sunridge which use the name 'Sunridge' when referring to Rundle Station.

== Media appearances ==
Rundle Station was one of multiple areas of Calgary featured in a 2016 VICE News documentary about the North American opioid crisis, which goes into detail about how much the province of Alberta has been affected by fentanyl.

== Around the station ==
=== Major destinations ===
- Peter Lougheed Hospital
- Sunridge Mall
- Village Square Leisure Centre
- Village Square Mall

=== Communities ===
Residential

- Pineridge
- Rundle
- Whitehorn

Commercial

- Sunridge

Industrial

- Horizon

=== Education facilities ===
Secondary

- Lester B. Pearson High School

Primary

- Cecil Swanson Elementary School
- Chief Justice Milvian Elementary School
- Dr. Gordon Middle School
- Rundle Elementary School
- St. Rupert School

=== Major streets ===
- 16 Avenue NE
- 32 Avenue NE
- 36 Street NE
- Rundlehorn Drive NE

== Station upgrades ==
As part of Calgary Transit's plan to operate 4-car trains by the end of 2014, all 3-car platforms were extended. In addition to a platform extension, Rundle station had upgraded station furnishings installed. Construction was completed in the later months of 2013.

Calgary Transit, in collaboration with Shaw Communications, announced on November 16, 2016 that 8 new locations for Public Wi-Fi services would be added to the Calgary C-Train system. These new locations would add public Wi-Fi to 18 new stations; including Rundle Station. These changes ere done as they would improve transit experience for their users, which would improve customer commitment.

As a part of station upgrades with Rundle along with Marlborough, the interiors of the two stations were renovated starting in June 2016 and finishing in December 2017. This was to bring the two stations up to the same standard as Whitehorn Station which was renovated in 2011. These renovations would include: modifications to the stations layout to improve traffic such as changing the location of the elevators, replacement of the escalators and removal of the 'down' escalator, improvement and increasing of security cameras, upgraded heating and ventilation. These changes would also come with a complete overhaul of the interior design of the two stations, coming with a new modernistic design that was generally cleaner and less dated (in comparison to the old design which featured gothic designs, with heavy use of bricks and was overall dark and dimly lit).

== Crime ==
Rundle Station has been criticized for being a crime hotspot in the Calgary C-Train System. On a CityNews interview in January 2022 with Calgary Transit Lead Staff 'Stephen Tauro', it was listed as one of the 5 stations with an unusually high crime rate. The others being: Marlborough, Southland, Heritage and Sunalta Stations.

During the month of March 2023, an underground drug operation along the Calgary C-Train system would get disrupted. Officers seized the substances of fentanyl, methamphetamine, cocaine, morphine, and Xanax. Multiple weapons such as 21 knives, two machetes, two hatchets, a handgun, and a can of bear spray were also seized by police. 40 people would get arrested between multiple stations, Rundle along with Franklin, Southland, Marlborough, Heritage, Sunalta, Whitehorn, Brentwood, Chinook, Crowfoot, 8th Street SW, Anderson, Dalhousie, Westbrook Stations would have arrests relating to the aforementioned drug trade.

== Transit connections ==
Bus connections to Rundle station as of 31 August, 2026:

=== Calgary Transit ===
- Max Orange (Brentwood) / Max Orange (Saddletowne)
- 19 - Dalhousie (West)
- 32 - Huntington (West)
- 33 - Barlow/Max Bell (South)
- 34 - Pineridge (Clockwise)
- 43 - 36 Street East Whitehorn (North) / 43 - 36 Street East Chinook (South)
- 48 - Rundle (Counterclockwise)
- 555 - Dashmesh Centre (Sundays service only)

=== Airdrie Transit ===
- 900 - CrossIron Mills

== See also ==
- CTrain
- Blue Line (Calgary)
- Sunridge Mall
- Rundle, Calgary
- Marlborough station
- Whitehorn station
