= Lester B. Pearson High School (Calgary) =

Lester B. Pearson Senior High School
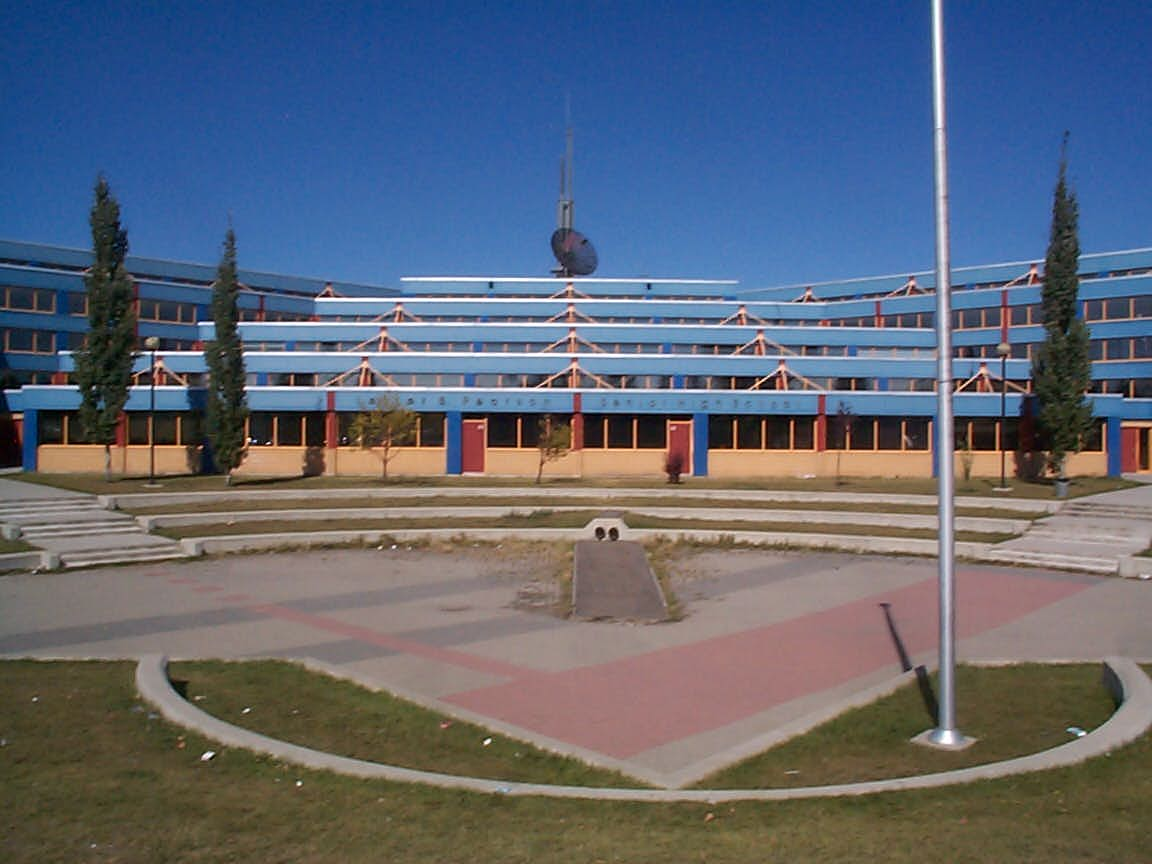

Location
- 3020 52 St NE; Calgary, Alberta, T1Y-5P4; Canada; 51.07°N 113.9582°W

Information
- School type: Senior High School
- Motto: Vision, Wisdom, Courage
- Founded: 1990
- School board: Calgary Board of Education
- School number: b865
- Grades: 10-12
- Enrollment: 1581 (2021)
  - Grade 10: 525
  - Grade 11: 521
  - Grade 12: 535
- Language: English, French
- Campus: Urban
- Area: Area III
- Colours: Red and Gold
- Team name: Pearson Patriots
- Communities served: Temple, Pineridge, Whitehorn, Rundle and all communities east of Deerfoot Trail for International Baccalaureate students.
- Feeder schools: Annie Gale, Clarence Sansom, Dr. Gordon Higgins, Bob Edwards (for French Immersion students). International Baccalaureate students will come to Pearson from all ten junior high schools situated east of Deerfoot Trail.
- Website: schools.cbe.ab.ca/b865/default.htm or pearsonpatriots.com

Lester B. Pearson High School is a public senior high school located in Calgary, Alberta, Canada administered by the Calgary Board of Education. The school is named for Nobel Laureate and Canadian Prime Minister Lester B. Pearson.

The school has offered the French Immersion program since 2003 and in the following year of September 2004, Lester B. Pearson became a fully accredited International Baccalaureate World School Lester B. Pearson High School is one of the five schools in Calgary to be offering the International Baccalaureate Programme in English, the school also offers opportunities to earn a combination of French Immersion and IB course certificates.

== Location ==
Lester B. Pearson High School is located in the Northeast of Calgary and serves the communities of Pineridge, Rundle, Temple, Whitehorn, and Monterey Park. Junior High feeder schools to Lester B. Pearson High School are Annie Gale, Clarence Sansom, and Dr. Gordon Higgins. Pearson is also the destination high school for all French Immersion and International Baccalaureate students east of Deerfoot Trail and north of Peigan Trail. The feeder school for the French Immersion program is Bob Edwards Junior High School. International Baccalaureate students will come to Pearson from all ten junior high schools situated in Area III of Calgary.

Pearson is also connected to the Village Square Leisure Center by a skyway. The walkway is not used anymore because of safety and legal reasons between the Calgary Board of Education and The City of Calgary. The Village Square Leisure Center includes services such as a public library, wave pool, gym, and many volunteer opportunities.

== History ==
The school opened in 1990 with a design for the 21st century. The building has been designed to provide an ideal learning environment with a variety of teaching and learning spaces which provide for individual, small group and class work. The school is fully networked with over 350 workstations including 60 computers in the John Rollins Media Centre/Library. L.B. Pearson has a 250-seat theater, acoustic music studio, 5 computer labs, teaching kitchen/cafeteria, 2 gymnasiums, as well as 64 classrooms, science labs, and shops. The school has over 1591 students enrolled as of the 2020–2021 school year.

In 1990, Lester B. Pearson's architecture was recognized by the American Institute of Architects and American Association of School Administrators, Award.

== Philosophy ==
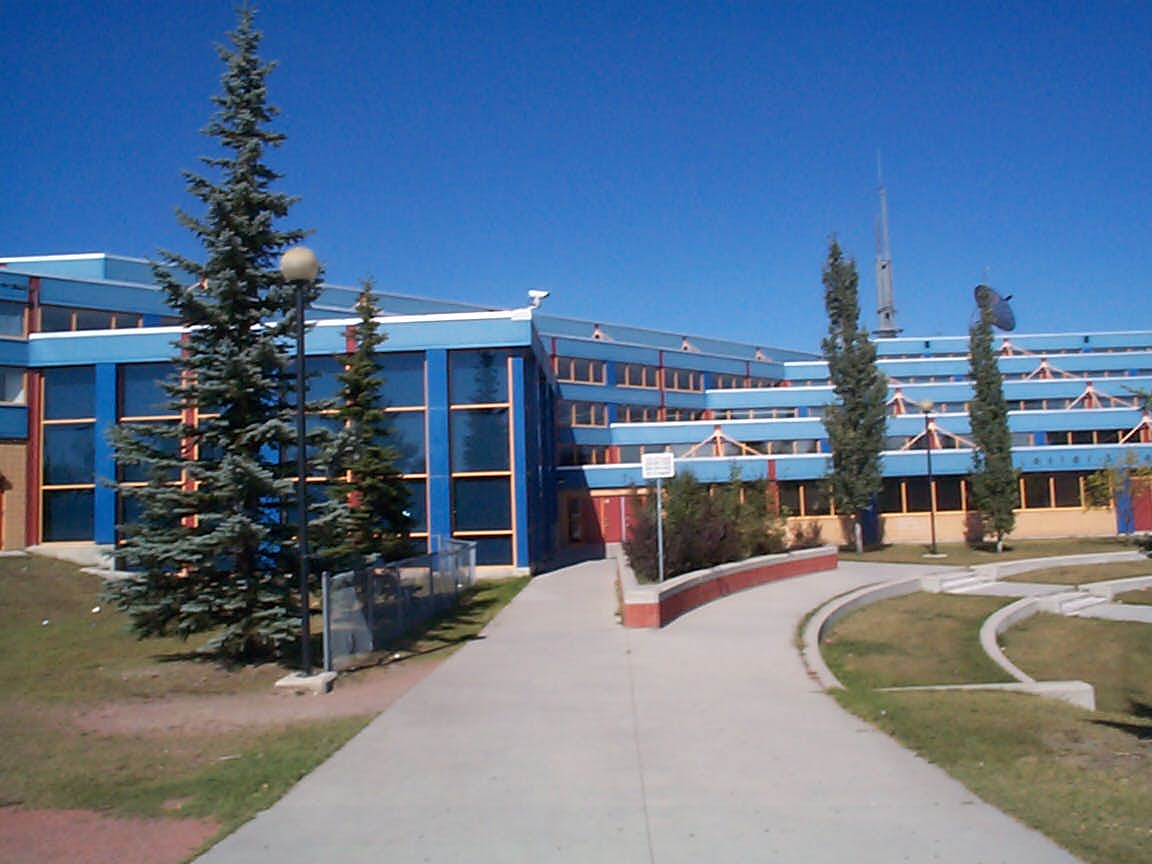
View of the back side of the school.

Lester B. Pearson High School is a member of the community of Calgary Senior High Schools and shares with them the Calgary Board of Education's goal of "Educating Tomorrow's Citizens Today."

== Programs ==
Lester B. Pearson High School's logo.

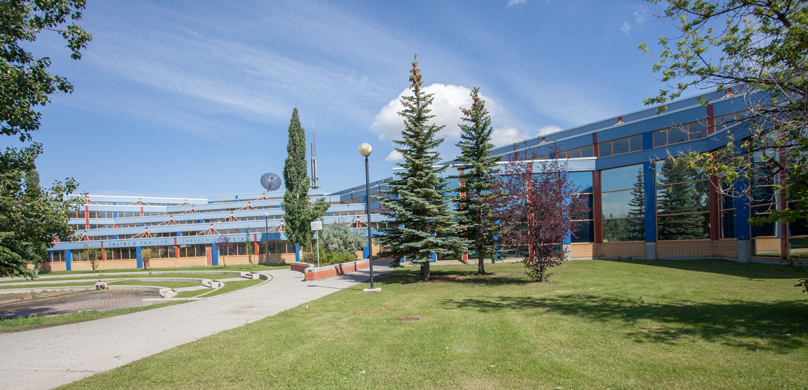
View of the back of the school

Lester B. Pearson High School offers a variety of programs; these include:

- International Baccalaureate Programme
- ACCESS (Attitude, Community, Competence, Elements of Academic Curriculum, Social Skills)
- French Immersion
- Adapted Learning Program (ALP)
- English Language Learning
- Summer School Classes
- Career and Technology Studies
- Dual Credit Program in Professional Foods
- Fine and Performing Arts
- Knowledge and Employability
- Off-campus Education – Work Experience and the Registered Apprenticeship Program

Further, the school is part of the Action for Bright Children Society.

== Special departments ==
Some courses have been constructed on a modular basis giving students flexibility in choosing topics and projects.

The building has been designed to provide a variety of teaching and learning spaces which provide for individual, small group and class work. Students in their last two years can opt to join an apprenticeship program.

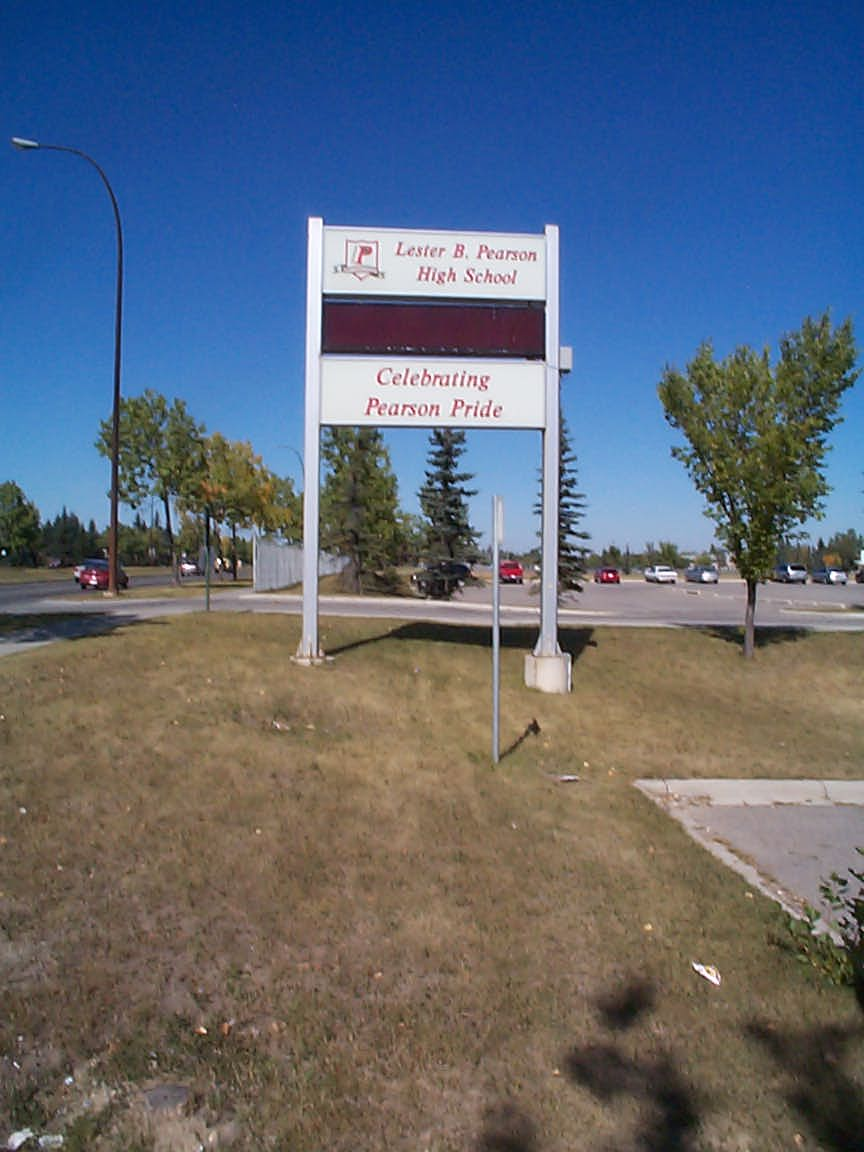
The school's sign (since replaced) on the left side of the building with the motto "Celebrating Pearson Pride"

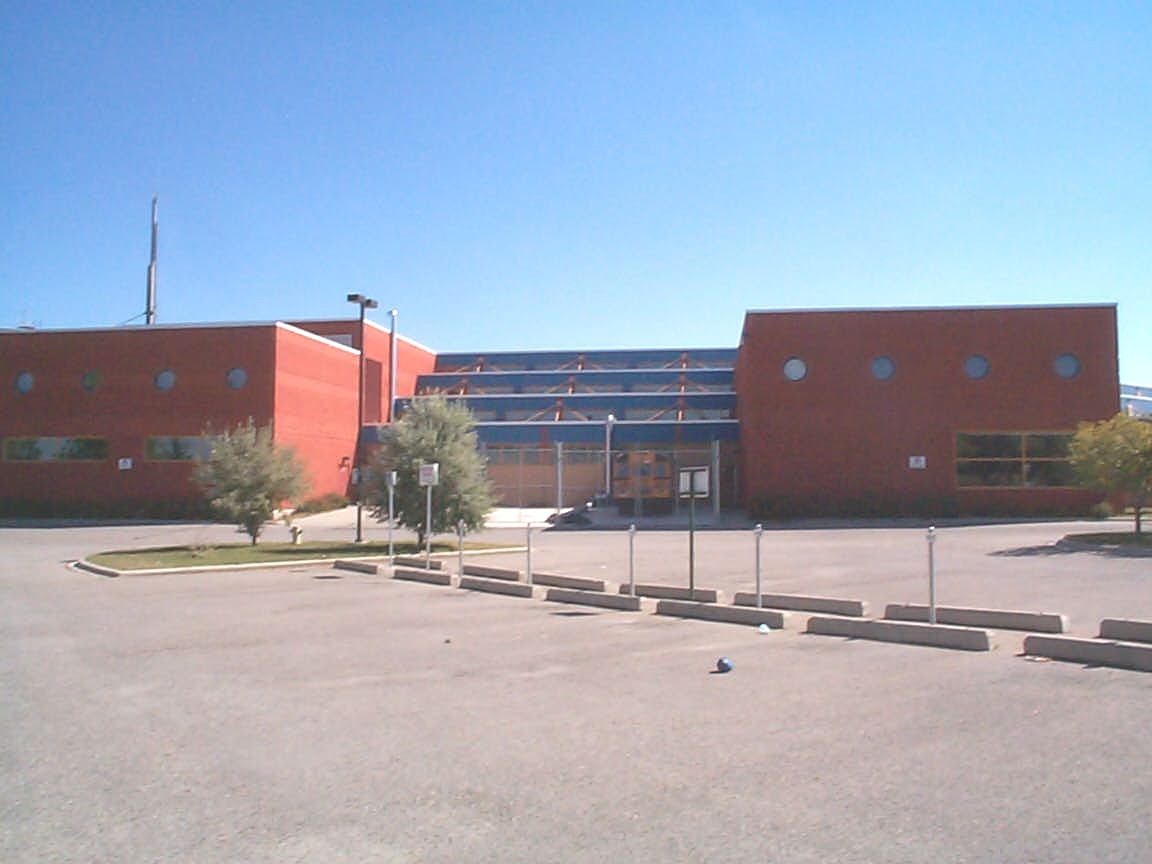
View of the southwest side of the school

== Athletics ==
Lester B. Pearson High School competes under the governing body of the Calgary Senior High School Athletic Association (CSHSAA) and the Alberta Schools Athletic Association (ASAA). Pearson offers a wide variety of opportunities for students to get involved in the athletic program – as an athlete, trainer, minor official or manager.

Sport	Grades	Boys and/or Girls
Diving	10–12	Boys and Girls
Volleyball	10–12	Boys and Girls
Basketball	10–12	Boys and Girls
Badminton	10–12	Boys and Girls
Soccer	10–12	Boys and Girls
Cross Country	10–12	Boys and Girls
Swimming	10–12	Boys and Girls
Track & Field	10–12	Boys and Girls
Rugby union	10–12	Boys and Girls
Field Hockey	10–12	Girls
Wrestling	10–12	Boys and Girls

Pearson competes in both Division I and II depending on the different sports. Students are encouraged to take advantage of the wide array of opportunities the athletic program has to offer.

LBP High School Girls Soccer team won their City Championships for Division 3 for the 2012–2013 season on November 1, 2012, with veteran coach Kelly Blake. This marked the first City Championship for Lester B. Pearson Girls Soccer on the 100th anniversary of the Calgary Senior High School Athletic Association (CSHSAA).

== Clubs and activities ==
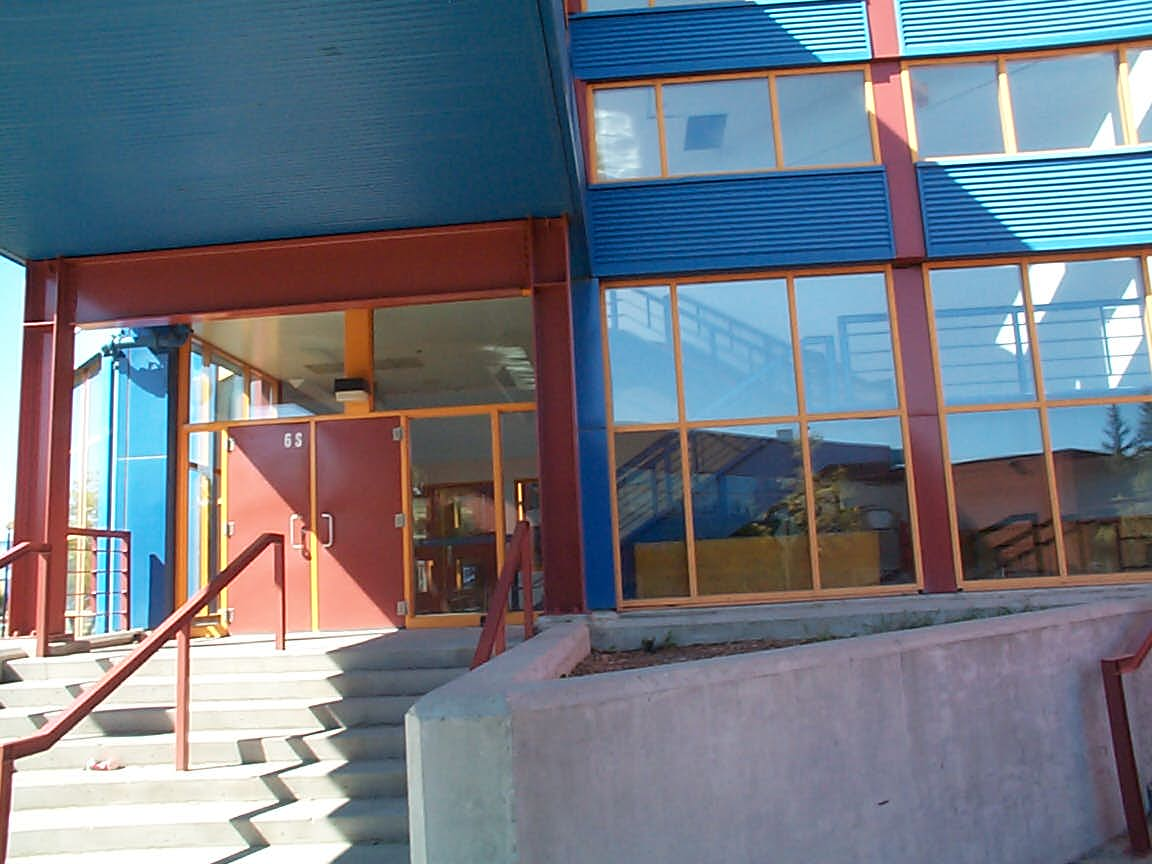
Pearson opened in 1990 with a design for the 21st century. This is a view of the east entrance with the skyway above.

Lester B. Pearson High School offers a wide variety of clubs and activities such as:

- Animation
- Athletic Teams
- Chess Club
- Connections
- Creative Writing
- Culinary Team
- Debate/Speech
- Drama Club
- Finance Club
- F-Word (Feminism) Club
- FNMI Meetings
- French for the Future
- Graduation Committee
- Gay Straight Alliance
- Junior Achievement
- Math Club
- Model UN
- Multicultural Girls in Action
- Muslim Youth Club
- Nerd Club (aka Dance Club)
- Pearson Press
- Robotics/Electronics
- School Store
- Speak Out
- SPIRIT / Leadership
- Yearbook
- Youth Volunteer Core

== Notable alumni ==
- Manmeet Bhullar – former Canadian politician and Member of the Legislative Assembly of Alberta
- Melissa O'Neil – Winner of Canadian Idol (Season 3), a reality TV singing competition on CTV. The Rookie, actress
- Robbie Sihota - former professional basketball player
