= Southland Leisure Centre =

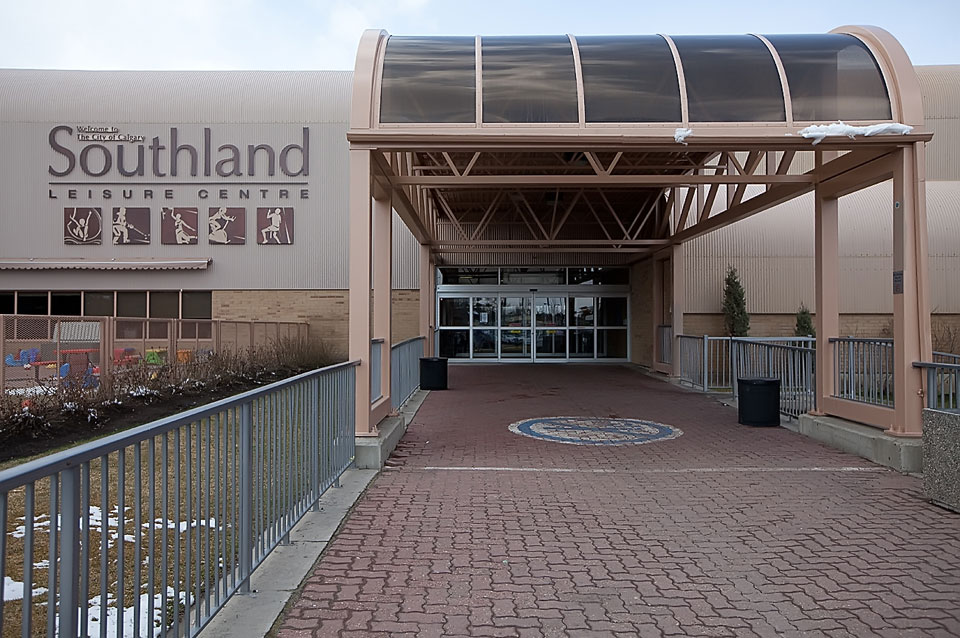
- Main Entrance
- Interactive map of the Southland Leisure Centre area

General information
- Location: 2000 Southland Dr. S.W., Calgary
- Coordinates: 50.96249°N 114.10797°W
- Opened: 1983

Technical details
- Floor area: 227,000 square feet

Website
- http://www.calgary.ca/CSPS/Recreation/Pages/Leisure-centres/Southland.aspx

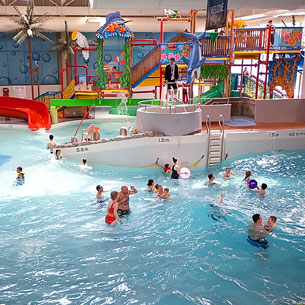
View of the Water park and Wave pool

The Southland Leisure Centre is an indoor leisure centre situated in the southwest community on Palliser in Calgary, Alberta. The multipurpose recreational facility was built at the same time (although additions and redesigns have been made since) as the surrounding neighbourhood. Along with Village Square Leisure Centre, it is one of two leisure centres owned and operated by The City of Calgary.

Southland Leisure Centre provides a wide range of registered programs and drop-in programs and activities, including sports training, gymnastics, day camps, racquet sports, skating, dance, martial arts, so-pitch, hockey and skating lessons. Southland also offers preschool programs including playschool, tot's gym time and more.

== Facilities ==
- Wave pool begins wide and shallow (much like a beach) progressively deepening into a regular swimming pool halved in width is the box-shaped "deep end" (No diving).
- Water park: A water park with a 500-gallon dump bucket, rope bridges, spray guns and other splash stations.
- Water slides: Includes the "red slide" and "blue slide". There are also two smaller slides in the water park area.
- Deepwater dive tank and diving board
- Hot tub.
- Steam room.
- Two ice rinks, named after Joe Kryczka and Ed Whalen.
- Climbing Wall
- Weight room
- Multipurpose rooms named after communities in the area, sometimes called birthday rooms.
- Rental Centre for floating aids, tubes, etc. as well as selling pool equipment.

== Access ==
By car, Southland Leisure Centre is accessible off of Southland Drive.

By transit, it can be accessed via the MAX Yellow as well as by routes 99, 125, and 126 from Southland Station.
