= Temple, Calgary =

Temple
- Neighbourhood
- Location of Temple in Calgary
- Coordinates: 51°05′20″N 113°56′49″W
- Country: Canada
- Province: Alberta
- City: Calgary
- Quadrant: NE
- Ward: 5
- Established: 1977
- Annexed: 1961

Government
  - Mayor: Jeromy Farkas
  - Administrative body: Calgary City Council
  - Councillor: Raj Dhaliwal (Independent)

Area
  - Total: 2.6 km^{2} (1.0 sq mi)
- Elevation: 1,090 m (3,580 ft)

Population (2021)
  - Total: 10,525
  - Average Income: $87,000
- Website: Temple Community Association; Community Association website

Temple is a neighbourhood in the northeast quadrant of Calgary, Alberta. It is bounded to the north by McKnight Boulevard, to the east by 68 Street E, to the south by 32 Avenue N and to the west by 52 Street E.

== History ==
The land that is currently Temple was proposed under the name of "Montrose" in the early 1910s. However this was never developed initially due to the Great Depression, in which Calgary's development slowed significantly.

The land that would later become Temple would be annexed by the city of Calgary in 1961. With Temple being established and developed starting in 1977.

Temple, alongside Rundle, Pineridge, and Whitehorn were all developed under a cluster called "The Properties", where each of their names ended with "Properties". It is not known when Temple Properties was renamed to Temple.

== Demographics ==
In the City of Calgary's 2021 municipal census, Temple had a population of 10,525 living in 3,440 dwellings With a land area of 2.6 km^{2} (1.0 sq mi), it had a population density of 4,050/km^{2} (10,480/sq mi) in 2021.

Residents in this community had a median household income of $87,000 in 2021, and there were 11% low income residents living in the neighbourhood. As of 2021, 41% of the residents were immigrants, predominantly of East Indian origin. A proportion of 5.4% of the buildings were condominiums or apartments, and 22.6% of the housing was used for renting.

== Crime ==
Temple has a reputation for high crime like other communities in Northeast Calgary, however this reputation is unfounded with it being on the safer side of Calgary communities.

Crime Data
Year	Crime Rate (/100)
2018	2.9
2019	3.4
2020	2.3
2021	2.8
2022	2.7
2023	1.8

== Education ==
The community is served by Annie Foote Elementary and Guy Weadick Elementary public schools, as well as by St. Thomas More Elementary and Father Scollen Elementary & Junior High (Catholic).

== See also ==
- List of neighbourhoods in Calgary
