= Montgomery, Calgary =

Montgomery
- Neighbourhood
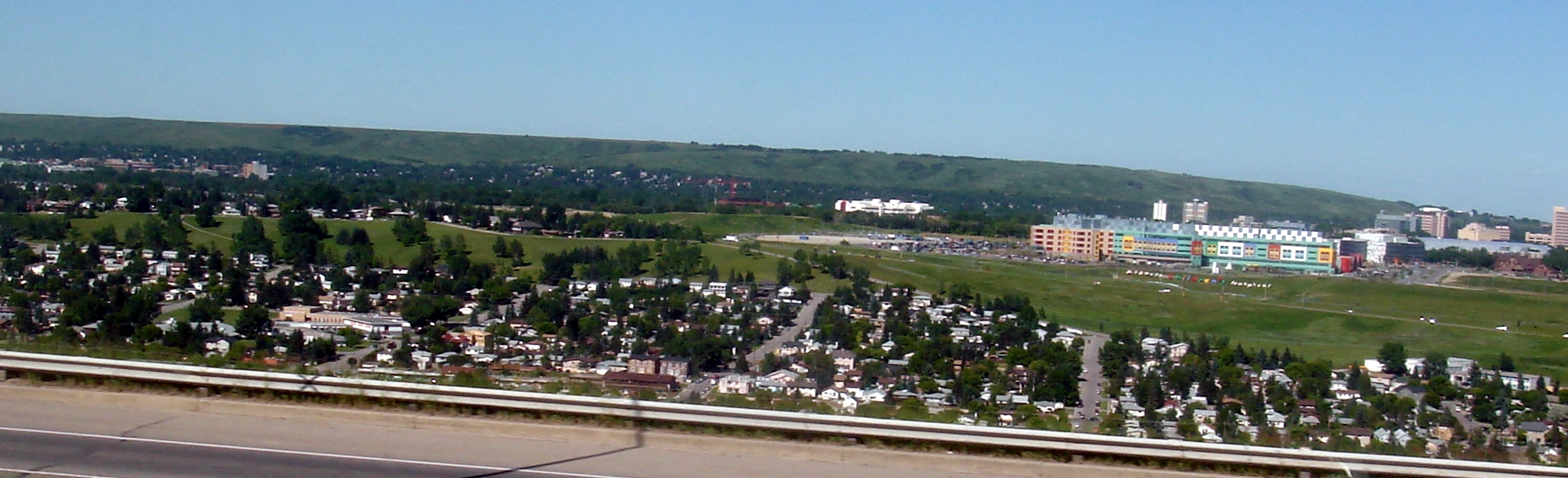
- Montgomery and the Alberta Children's Hospital

- Location of Montgomery in Calgary
- Coordinates: 51°04′38″N 114°09′34″W
- Country: Canada
- Province: Alberta
- City: Calgary
- Quadrant: NW
- Ward: 1
- Established: 1911
- Amalgamated: 1963

Government
  - Mayor: Jeromy Farkas
  - Administrative body: Calgary City Council
  - Councillor: Kim Tyers (Communities First)
- Elevation: 1,100 m (3,600 ft)

Population (2006)
  - Total: 3,713
  - Average Income: $42,795
- Time zone: UTC−06:00 (Alberta Time)
- Website: Montgomery Community Association

Montgomery is a residential neighbourhood in the northwest quadrant of Calgary, Alberta. Its boundaries are Shaganappi Trail to the east, 32nd Avenue and Market Mall to the north, and the Bow River to the south and west. Immediately across the river to the west is the community of Bowness, itself a town until being annexed by Calgary in 1964.

Montgomery was originally established as a community in 1911. In 1943, it was renamed to Montgomery, named after Field Marshal Bernard Law Montgomery, 1st Viscount Montgomery of Alamein, a celebrated British military leader who played an important role in World War I and World War II. On December 24, 1957, Montgomery incorporated as a town, but changed to village status less than four months later on April 15, 1958. The village was eventually absorbed by the City of Calgary on August 15, 1963, via amalgamation.

Montgomery is represented in the Calgary City Council by the Ward 1 councillor. The community has an area redevelopment plan in place.

== Demographics ==
Population history, former Town of Montgomery
Year	Pop.	±%
1951	1,390	—
1956	4,646	+234.2%
1961	5,077	+9.3%
Source: Statistics Canada

In the City of Calgary's 2012 municipal census, Montgomery had a population of 3,860 living in 1,839 dwellings, a 4.7% increase from its 2011 population of 3,686. With a land area of 3 km^{2} (1.2 sq mi), it had a population density of 1,290/km^{2} (3,300/sq mi) in 2012.

Residents in this community had a median household income of $42,795 in 2000, and there were 24.7% low income residents living in the neighbourhood. As of 2000, 18.7% of the residents were immigrants. A proportion of 11.4% of the buildings were condominiums or apartments, and 32.8% of the housing was used for renting.

Pop. Overtime
Year	Population
2014	4,104
2015	4,246
2016	4,358
2017	4,353
2018	4,467
2019	4,515
2021	4,175

== Crime ==
In the May 2023-May 2024 data period, Montgomery had a crime rate of 5.483/100, a decrease from the previous data period.

This puts it at this comparison to other Calgary communities: Saddle Ridge (1.358/100), Whitehorn (1.741/100), Rundle (2.342/100), Brentwood (2.348/100), Acadia (2.542/100), Bowness (2.934/100), Shawnessy (3.296/100), Inglewood (3.438/100), Sunnyside (3.650/100), Marlborough (4.703/100), Southwood (5.147/100), Sunalta (5.307/100), Montgomery (5.483/100), Forest Lawn (6.528/100), Rosscarrock (7.049/100), Downtown Commercial Core (12.705/100), Downtown East Village (15.605/100), Manchester (43.368/100).

=== Crime data by year ===
Crime Data
Year	Crime Rate (/100)
2018	5.0
2019	5.8
2020	6.3
2021	5.7
2022	6.4
2023	4.5

== Education ==
Terrace Road Elementary public school is located in this community. Foundations for the Future Charter School now occupies the former Montgomery Junior High School.

== See also ==
- List of former urban municipalities in Alberta
