= Village Square Leisure Centre =

Coordinates: 51.0758°N 113.9546°W

- Interactive map of the Village Square Leisure Centre area

The Village Square Leisure Centre is a 5.5 acre indoor leisure centre situated in the Pineridge community of north east Calgary, Alberta. The multipurpose recreational facility was built at the same time (although additions and redesigns have been made since) as the surrounding neighbourhood. Alongside Southland Leisure Centre, it is one of two leisure centres owned and operated by the City of Calgary. Attached to the leisure centre are a library, high-school, shopping centre, food court, and small professional centre.

A skywalk pedestrian walkway similar to the +15 connects the leisure centre to the neighbouring high school, Lester B. Pearson. The walkway is used by staff and by day camp participants from the leisure centre who take advantage of the unused school gymnasiums in the summer.

== Facilities ==
- The wave pool begins wide and shallow, much like a beach, progressively deepening into a regular swimming pool of 6 lanes for lap swimming and water volleyball. Halved in width is the box-shaped deep end. Diving is prohibited.
- The Safari Splash Zone is a water park with a 500-gallon dump bucket, rope bridges, spray guns and other splash stations.
- Water slides includes the blue slide and the Thunder-Run slide, which was added in the late 90s as an external multi-story addition. The twin red slides were removed in the 2000s due to concerns over weak swimmers being discharged in deep water. There are also four smaller slides in the water park area.
- The rope swing has been removed as of 2024.
- The high diving board was removed sometime in the 2000s.
- In the late 2000s the hot tub was moved, enlarged and made wheelchair accessible.
- Steam room
- Two artificial ice arenas (185' x 85') include an observation deck and a large fireplace near the second arena.
- Two full-size gymnasiums are separable into multiple smaller areas. They include expandable bleachers and badminton and basketball courts.
- A weight room was added in the 2000s, which replaced the rock climbing wall / gymnastic area which is still partially visible on the far wall.
- Floating floor fitness studio.
- Dance / martial art / activity room.
- Jungle gym room, designed for pre-schoolers.
- Multipurpose rooms named after communities in the area, sometimes called birthday rooms.
- Rental center for floating aids, tubes, badminton rackets, basketballs, and other equipment.

== Past elements ==
- Twin red water "race" slides
- High dive
- Original kiddie pool (relocated)
- Dual hot tubs
- Pool-accessible cafeteria
- Arcade
- Ice cream shop
- Climbing wall
- Gymnastics area and trampolines
- Outside upper-level metal sculptures
- Yearly Haunted House for Halloween
