= Bowness, Calgary =

Bowness
- Neighbourhood
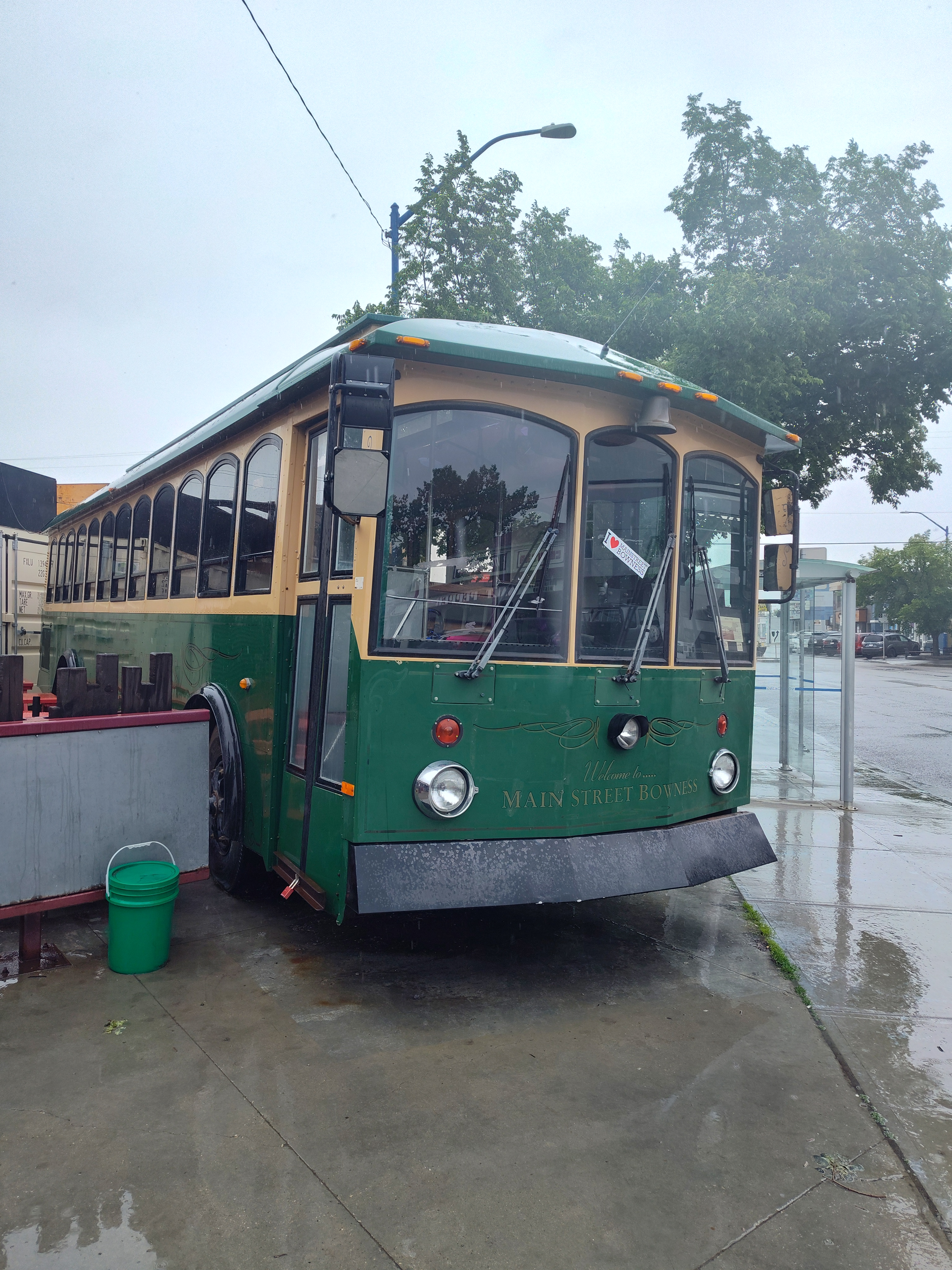
- Historic Bowness Trolleybus

- Location of Bowness in Calgary
- Coordinates: 51°05′28″N 114°11′57″W
- Country: Canada
- Province: Alberta
- City: Calgary
- Quadrant: NW
- Ward: 1
- Established: 1896
- Village: February 14, 1948
- Town: November 5, 1951
- Amalgamated: August 15, 1964

Government
  - Mayor: Jeromy Farkas
  - Administrative body: Calgary City Council
  - Councillor: Kim Tyers (Communities First)
- Elevation: 1,080 m (3,540 ft)

Population (2008)
  - Total: 11,308
  - Average Income: $40,468
- Time zone: UTC−06:00 (Alberta Time)
- Website: Bowness Community Association

Bowness is the oldest neighbourhood and former town in west Calgary, Alberta, Canada. The former town was amalgamated into the City of Calgary in 1964.

The neighbourhood is bordered by the Bow River to the north and east, 16 Avenue to the south, and Stoney Trail to the west. The neighbourhood of Montgomery, another former town amalgamated into the City of Calgary a year earlier in 1963, is located across the river to the east.

On the northwest end of the community is one of Calgary's most popular parks, Bowness Park. The park sits between the Bow River and a lagoon, and is popular for picnics, summer sports, ice skating in the winter, and boating. It is also part of the city's large pedestrian pathway network.

Bowness is represented in the Calgary City Council by the Ward 1 councillor. Residents of the area are called "Bownesians" (/boʊˈniːʒɪnz/).

The community has an area redevelopment plan in place.

== History ==
=== Early history ===
The Bow Valley, where Bowness is situated, has been occupied by native peoples since the end of the last ice age, around 10,500 years ago. Archeological evidence shows that the Nitsitapii (Blackfoot) have been in the area for over a thousand years, with Stoney, Cree and Tsuu T'ina peoples arriving from the sixteenth century onwards. Non-natives reached the region in the late 1700s, after which native populations began to decline rapidly, due to epidemics and the decimation of the bison herds on which they depended. In 1877, the Blackfoot, Blood, Peigan, Tsuu T'ina and Stoney First Nations signed Treaty 7, were forced to live on reserves that covered some of their traditional hunting grounds.

At about the same time Treaty 7 was signed, the Dominion Land Survey was done, making it easier to lease or sell land in the west of Canada. The area which is now Bowness was leased for a while by the Cochrane Ranche Company, from 1883. It was then bought and sold several times over the next few decades. Two of these sales were important for the subsequent history of Bowness. In 1890–91 Thomas Stone and Jasper M. Richardson purchased the land. They started the Bowness Ranche and built a ranch house whose stables and barns were on an island in the river which is now Bowness Park. The name Bowness was apparently chosen by Stone, who had enjoyed visiting Bowness-on-Windermere in the English Lake District before coming to Canada.

The second sale of note was in 1908, to John Hextall, an English solicitor. Calgary, just six miles to the east, was booming at the time and Hextall envisioned turning Bowness into an exclusive residential suburb "in a natural scenic setting of great beauty". In 1911, he subdivided part of the ranch, built a bridge personally for $75,000, and got the City of Calgary to run its streetcar line across the bridge into his development, which he called Bowness Estates. In return, he donated two islands on the Bow to the city, for use as a park, now known as Bowness Park. (This arrangement is strikingly similar to one made in 1909 to develop the Glenora suburb of Edmonton.)

Despite an aggressive advertising campaign, and improvements such as the building of a golf course and club house, only a handful of lots were sold. There was a downturn in the economy and then World War I broke out in 1914, and Hextall himself died the same year. After the war, Bowness languished, although Bowness Park was extremely popular with Calgarians, who came in the thousands on the streetcar. Some small farms were established and enough lots sold to justify building a school in 1932, some stores, and in 1934 a post office. Marty Wood, the famous rodeo cowboy, arrived with his family in 1940 or 1941, and attended Bowness School. His parents opened riding stables on Chinook (now 34th.) Avenue. Of note also was the use of a large field near the park, the Bowness Flying Field, as Calgary's first commercial airport. It was managed by Fred McCall, a Canadian wartime flying ace, who flew mostly sightseeing flights to Banff and around the area throughout the twenties.

Bowness began to take off again after World War II, when the government provided 48 one acre plots to returning veterans, in an area known as the Soldiers' Settlement. Schools and churches were built and in 1947 two theatres were opened to serve the growing population. A volunteer fire brigade was formed, a fire hall built, and other public services provided.

=== Incorporation to amalgamation ===
Population history, former Town of Bowness
Year	Pop.	±%
1951	2,922	—
1956	6,217	+112.8%
1961	9,184	+47.7%
Source: Statistics Canada

Bowness incorporated as a village on February 14, 1948. After recording a population of 2,922 in the 1951 Census of Canada, the village then incorporated as the Town of Bowness on November 5, 1951. John Mackintosh was elected as the first mayor of the Town of Bowness in March 1952.

Bowness grew considerably following incorporation in 1951. By 1956, its population doubled to 6,217 and then tripled to 9,184 in 1961. Following the adjacent Town of Montgomery's amalgamation into the City of Calgary in 1963, the Town of Bowness held a vote in October 1963 to determine its residents' position on the town being absorbed by Calgary. The result was 1,003 votes in favour and 397 in opposition. The Town of Bowness was subsequently amalgamated into the City of Calgary on August 15, 1964. The last population recorded for Bowness was 9,116 in 1964.

== Bowness today ==
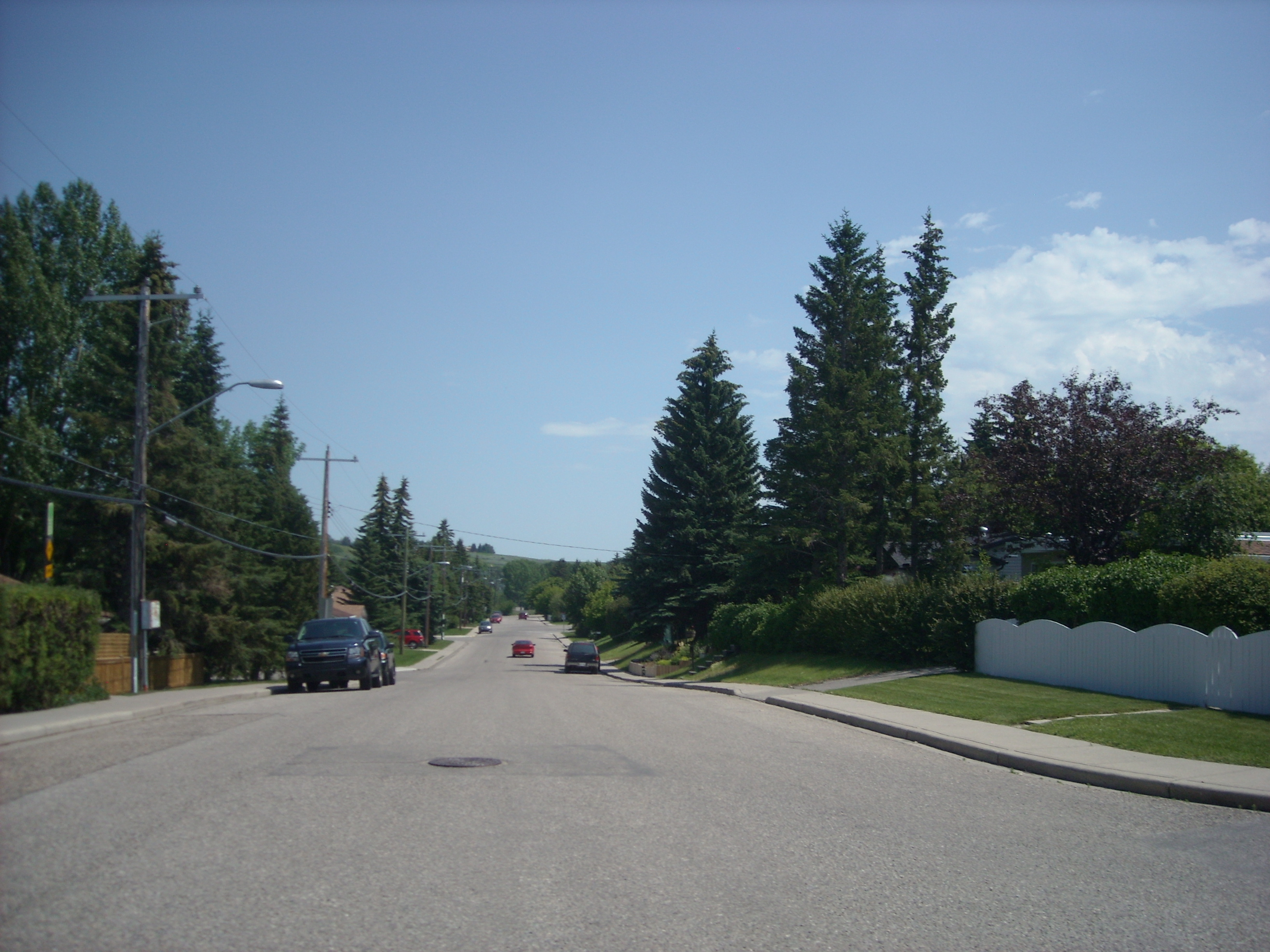
Residential area in Bowness along 48 Avenue NW

Since Bowness was amalgamated, it has had to cope with a number of social issues, in part due to its origins as an autonomous community. Bowness is home to both wealthy and disadvantaged residents and is more socioeconomically diverse than many of Calgary's newest suburban neighbourhoods. This diversity has contributed to some socioeconomic problems in the community (including crime). An example of this socioeconomic diversity can be seen in the difference in housing stock between the high-priced homes and properties along the Bow River, and the less expensive, former military housing just a few blocks away.

Like many older Calgary neighbourhoods, Bowness is experiencing gentrification with the renovation and reconstruction of some of the housing and commercial properties. For example, between 2006 and 2010 the commercial properties along "Main Street" Bowness have undergone renovation and revitalization including the former Bowness Hotel site. and the former Bow Cycle Building now housing the Calgary Public Library.

Bowness is home to a number of unique annual events including the Lions Club Stampede Parade and Breakfast held the first weekend of Stampede; the Tour de Bowness held at the end of July; and the Harvest Fair held the second weekend in September.

== Demographics ==
In the City of Calgary's 2012 municipal census, Bowness had a population of 11,012 living in 5,313 dwellings, a 2.9% increase from its 2011 population of 10,700. With a land area of 5.6 km^{2} (2.2 sq mi), it had a population density of 1,966/km^{2} (5,090/sq mi) in 2012.

Residents in this community had a median household income of $40,468 in 2000, and there were 24.1% low income residents living in the neighbourhood. As of 2000, 12.7% of the residents were immigrants. A proportion of 30.9% of the buildings were condominiums or apartments, and 45.6% of the housing was used for renting.

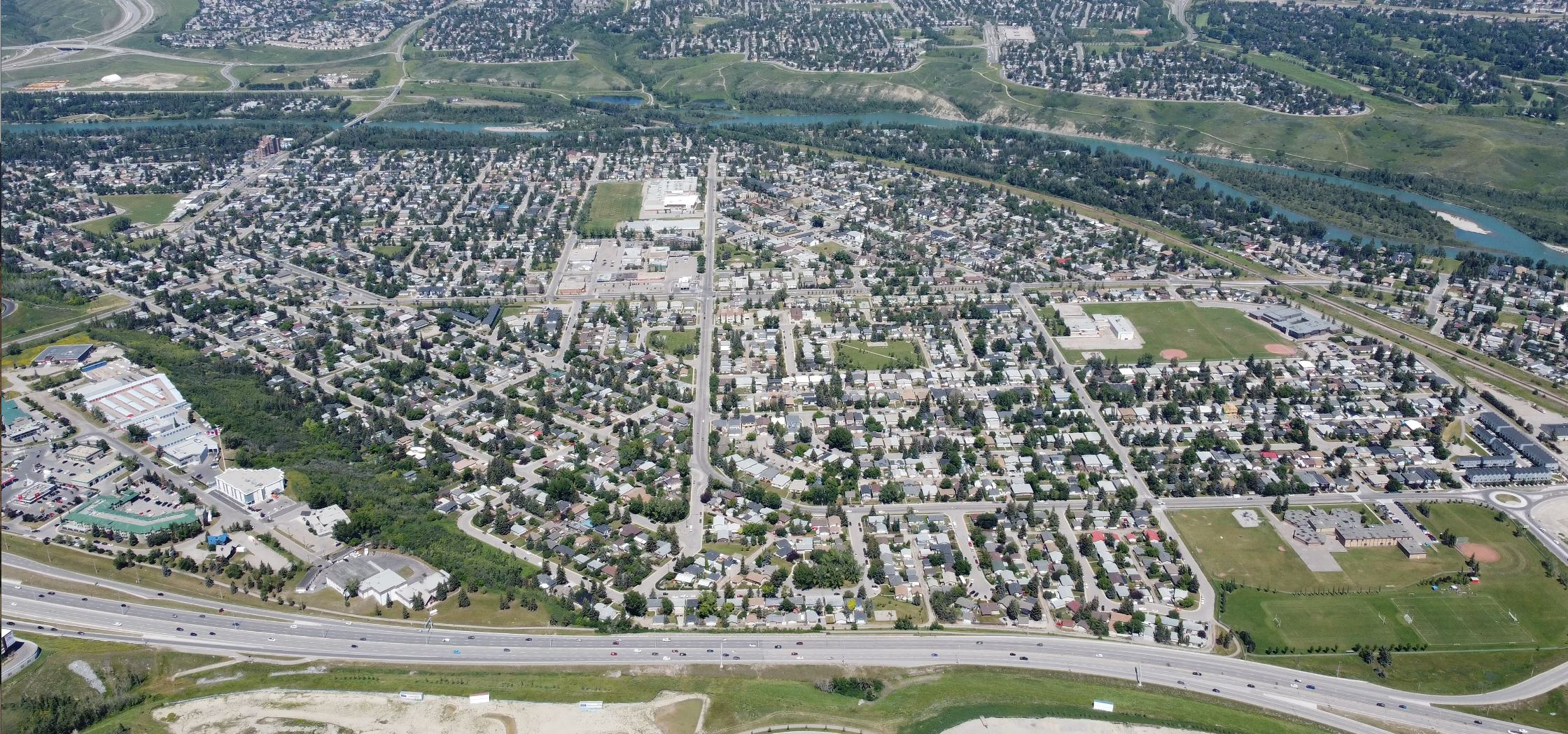
Aerial View of Bowness 2022

== Crime ==
In the May 2023-May 2024 data period, Bowness had a crime rate of 2.934/100, an increase from the previous data period.

This puts it at this comparison to other Calgary communities: Saddle Ridge (1.358/100), Whitehorn (1.741/100), Rundle (2.342/100), Brentwood (2.348/100), Acadia (2.542/100), Bowness (2.934/100), Shawnessy (3.296/100), Inglewood (3.438/100), Sunnyside (3.650/100), Marlborough (4.703/100), Southwood (5.147/100), Sunalta (5.307/100), Montgomery (5.483/100), Forest Lawn (6.528/100), Rosscarrock (7.049/100), Downtown Commercial Core (12.705/100), Downtown East Village (15.605/100), Manchester (43.368/100).

=== Crime data by year ===
Crime Data
Year	Crime Rate (/100)
2018	4.5
2019	3.8
2020	3.4
2021	3.6
2022	3.7
2023	3.4

== Education ==
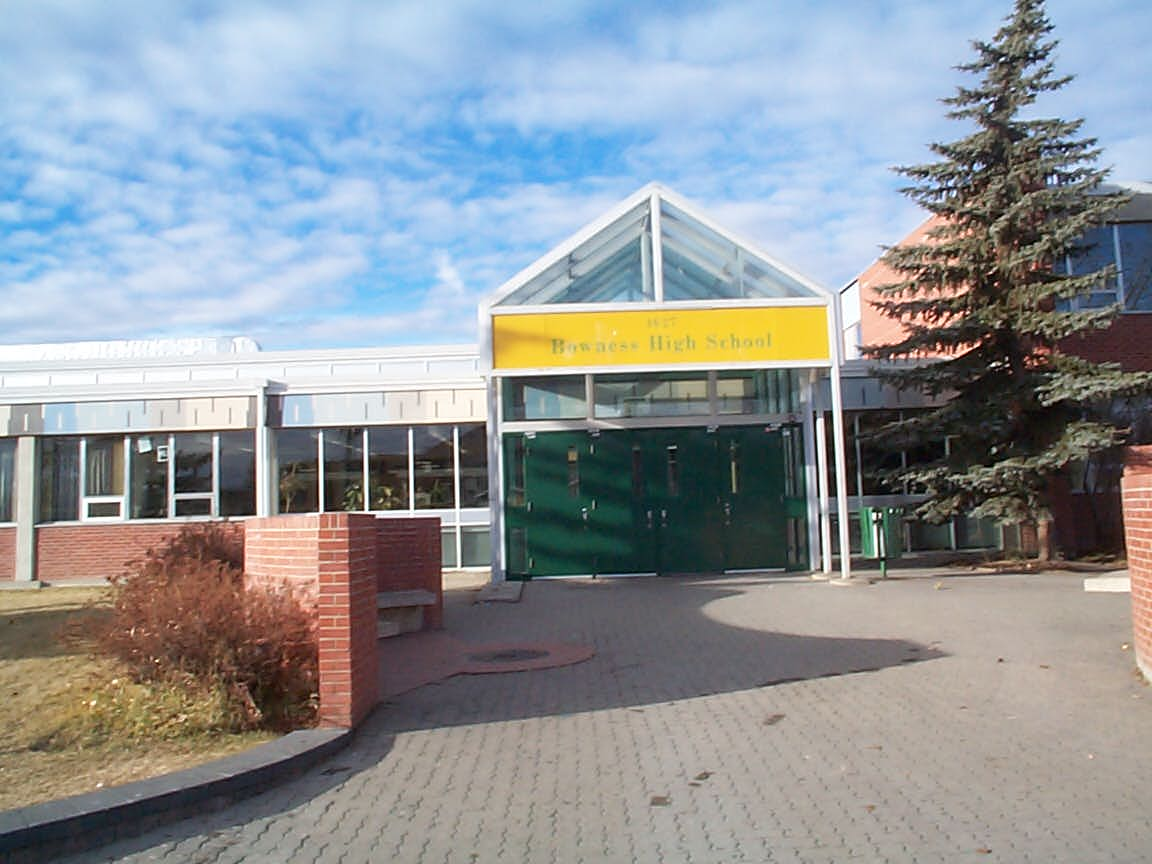
Bowness High School

Most public senior high school students from the community attend Bowness High School, which was built before the amalgamation. Junior high and elementary schools include Thomas B. Riley Junior High, Belevedere Parkway Elementary, Bowcroft Elementary, and R. B. Bennett Elementary (closed in 2004). There is also one K-9 Catholic school, Our Lady of the Assumption.

== See also ==
- List of former urban municipalities in Alberta
- List of neighbourhoods in Calgary
