= Brentwood, Calgary =

Brentwood
- Neighbourhood
- Location of Brentwood in Calgary
- Coordinates: 51°05′55″N 114°08′04″W
- Country: Canada
- Province: Alberta
- City: Calgary
- Quadrant: NW
- Ward: 4
- Established: 1960

Government
  - Mayor: Jeromy Farkas
  - Administrative body: Calgary City Council
  - Councillor: DJ Kelly (The Calgary Party)

Area
  - Total: 2.9 km^{2} (1.1 sq mi)
- Elevation: 1,115 m (3,658 ft)

Population (2006)
  - Total: 6,255
  - Average Income: $56,305
- Website: Brentwood Community Association

Brentwood is a neighbourhood in the northwest quadrant of Calgary, Alberta. The neighbourhood is bordered by John Laurie Boulevard to the north, Crowchild Trail to the south, Shaganappi Trail to the west, and Brisebois Drive & Charleswood Drive on the east.

Brentwood was established as a neighbourhood in 1960 and is currently represented in the Calgary City Council by the Ward 4 councillor.

The neighbourhood is served by the Brentwood LRT Station.

== History ==
In May 2023, the roof collapsed on Brentwood Elementary School. Students were temporarily relocated as the school was temporarily closed. It is now fully operational again.

== Demographics ==
In the City of Calgary's 2012 municipal census, Brentwood had a population of 6,059 living in 2,595 dwellings, a 0.2% increase from its 2011 population of 6,049. With a land area of 2.9 km^{2} (1.1 sq mi), it had a population density of 2,090/km^{2} (5,410/sq mi) in 2012.

Residents in this community had a median household income of $56,305 in 2000, and there were 14.3% low income residents living in the neighbourhood. As of 2000, 22.7% of the residents were immigrants. A proportion of 15.7% of the buildings were condominiums or apartments, and 27.3% were used for renting.

== Education ==
Brentwood has one high school and one college located within its boundaries, Sir Winston Churchill High School, and Rocky Mountain College.

Junior high and elementary schools include, Brentwood School, Captain John Palliser School, Dr. E.W. Coffin School, Simon Fraser School, St. Luke Elementary School (Catholic), St. Jean Brebeuf School (Catholic).

The University of Calgary campus borders the community to the southwest, and the Southern Alberta Institute of Technology is located nearby the community being approximately 5 kilometers in distance from the centre of the neighbourhood.

== Amenities ==
Brentwood has two shopping malls within its area, Brentwood Village Shopping Centre, and Northland Mall. Nose Hill Library and the Sir Winston Churchill Aquatic Centre are located on the west end of the neighbourhood.

The community is also south of Nose Hill Park, which is known for its natural landscape.

== Crime ==
In the May 2023-May 2024 data period, Brentwood had a crime rate of 2.348/100, a decrease from the previous data period.

This puts it at this comparison to other Calgary communities: Saddle Ridge (1.358/100), Whitehorn (1.741/100), Rundle (2.342/100), Brentwood (2.348/100), Acadia (2.542/100), Bowness (2.934/100), Shawnessy (3.296/100), Inglewood (3.438/100), Sunnyside (3.650/100), Marlborough (4.703/100), Southwood (5.147/100), Sunalta (5.307/100), Montgomery (5.483/100), Forest Lawn (6.528/100), Rosscarrock (7.049/100), Downtown Commercial Core (12.705/100), Downtown East Village (15.605/100), Manchester (43.368/100).

=== Crime data by year ===
Crime Data
Year	Crime Rate (/100)
2018	3.2
2019	3.2
2020	3.2
2021	3.2
2022	4.2
2023	2.6

=== Historic incidents ===
During April 15, 2014, five young adults were stabbed to death at a house party located within the neighbourhood. The party was held to mark the end of the school year. The age of the victims ranged from 21 to 27 years old.

== See also ==
- List of neighbourhoods in Calgary
- List of parks in Calgary
