= Sunalta, Calgary =

Sunalta
- Neighbourhood
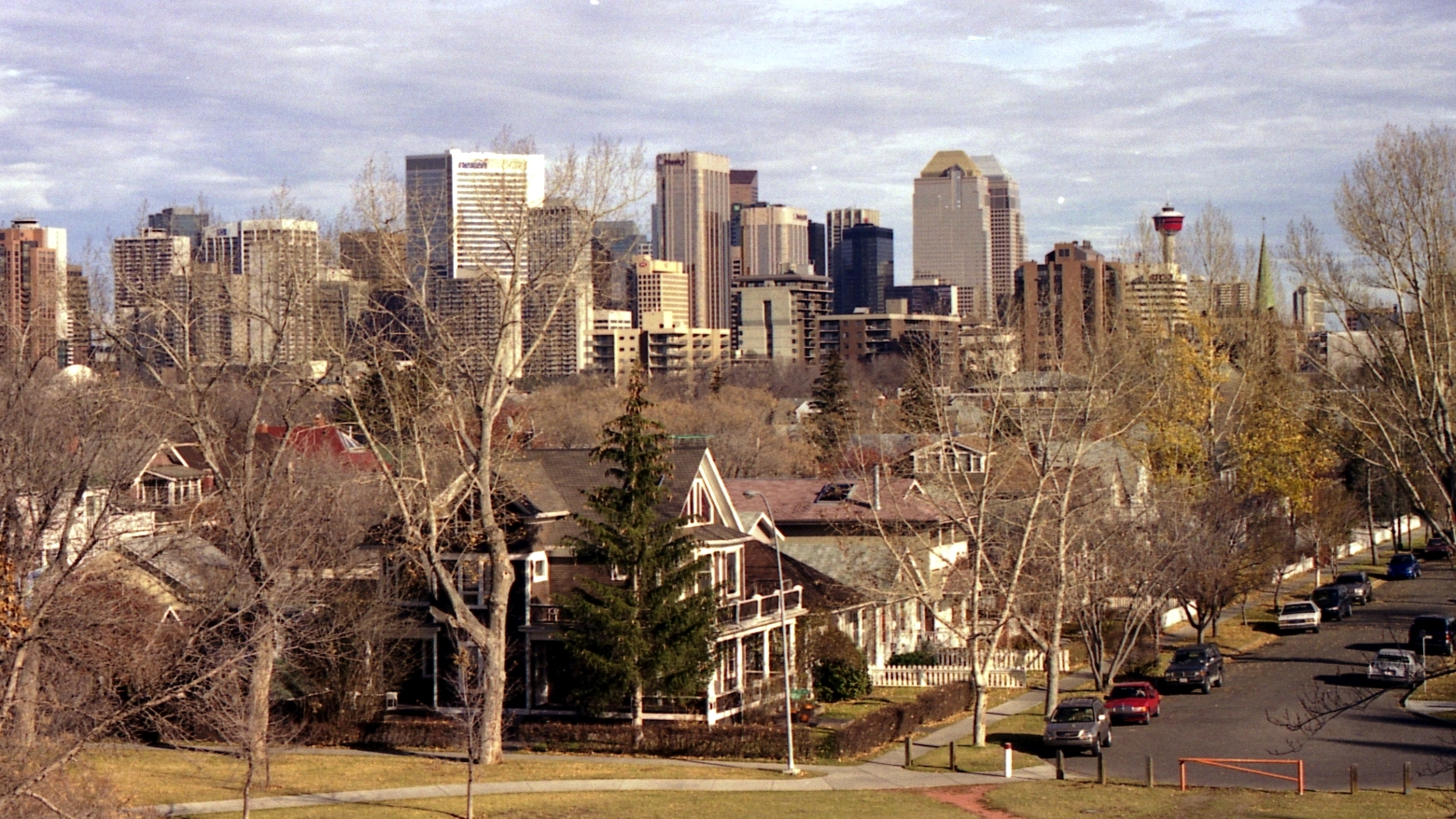
- Sunalta with downtown Calgary in background

- Location of Sunalta in Calgary
- Coordinates: 51°02′33″N 114°05′58″W
- Country: Canada
- Province: Alberta
- City: Calgary
- Quadrant: SW
- Ward: 8
- Established: 1910
- Annexed: 1907

Government
  - Mayor: Jeromy Farkas
  - Administrative body: Calgary City Council
  - Councillor: Nathaniel Schmidt (Independent)

Area
  - Total: 0.896 km^{2} (0.346 sq mi)
- Elevation: 1,055 m (3,461 ft)

Population (2019)
  - Total: 3,239
  - Average Income: $32,409
- Postal code: T3C

Sunalta is a residential neighbourhood in the southwest quadrant of Calgary, Alberta.

It is located in the inner city, southwest of downtown Calgary, south of the Bow River, and both east and north of the community of Scarboro. It contains a balanced mix of single-family detached home, condominium and apartment buildings.

It is represented in the Calgary City Council by Ward 8 councilor Nathaniel Schmidt, on a provincial level by Calgary-Currie MLA Janet Eremenko, and at federal level by Calgary Centre MP Greg McLean.

The community was established in 1910 on land annexed to the city of Calgary in 1907 and previously owned by the Canadian Pacific Railway. The community has an area redevelopment plan in place.

Sunalta has C-Train service through the Sunalta LRT Station.

== Demographics ==
In the City of Calgary's 2021 municipal census, Sunalta had a population of 3,090 living in 1,895 dwellings With a land area of 0.8809 km^{2} (0.3401 sq mi), it had a population density of 3,430/km^{2} (8,900/sq mi) in 2021.

Sunalta is a mixed income neighbourhood, with the 2021 median household income of $58,000, and 19% of Sunalta residents being low-income. As of 2021, 31% of the residents were immigrants. A proportion of 85.8% of the buildings were condominiums or apartments, and 76% of the housing was used for renting. 36% of Sunalta residents spent 30%+ of their incomes on housing, compared to the Calgary average of 23%.

== Crime ==
In the May 2023-May 2024 data period, Sunalta had a crime rate of 5.307/100, an increase from the previous data period.

This puts it at this comparison to other Calgary communities: Saddle Ridge (1.358/100), Whitehorn (1.741/100), Rundle (2.342/100), Brentwood (2.348/100), Acadia (2.542/100), Bowness (2.934/100), Shawnessy (3.296/100), Inglewood (3.438/100), Sunnyside (3.650/100), Marlborough (4.703/100), Southwood (5.147/100), Sunalta (5.307/100), Montgomery (5.483/100), Forest Lawn (6.528/100), Rosscarrock (7.049/100), Downtown Commercial Core (12.705/100), Downtown East Village (15.605/100), Manchester (43.368/100).

=== Crime data by year ===
Crime Data
Year	Crime Rate
2018	8.8 /100
2019	8.6 /100
2020	7.0 /100
2021	7.6 /100
2022	6.0 /100
2023	5.2 /100

== Education ==
The community is served by Sunalta Elementary public school and Sacred Heart Elementary school (also publicly funded.)

== See also ==
- List of neighbourhoods in Calgary
