= Sunridge Mall =

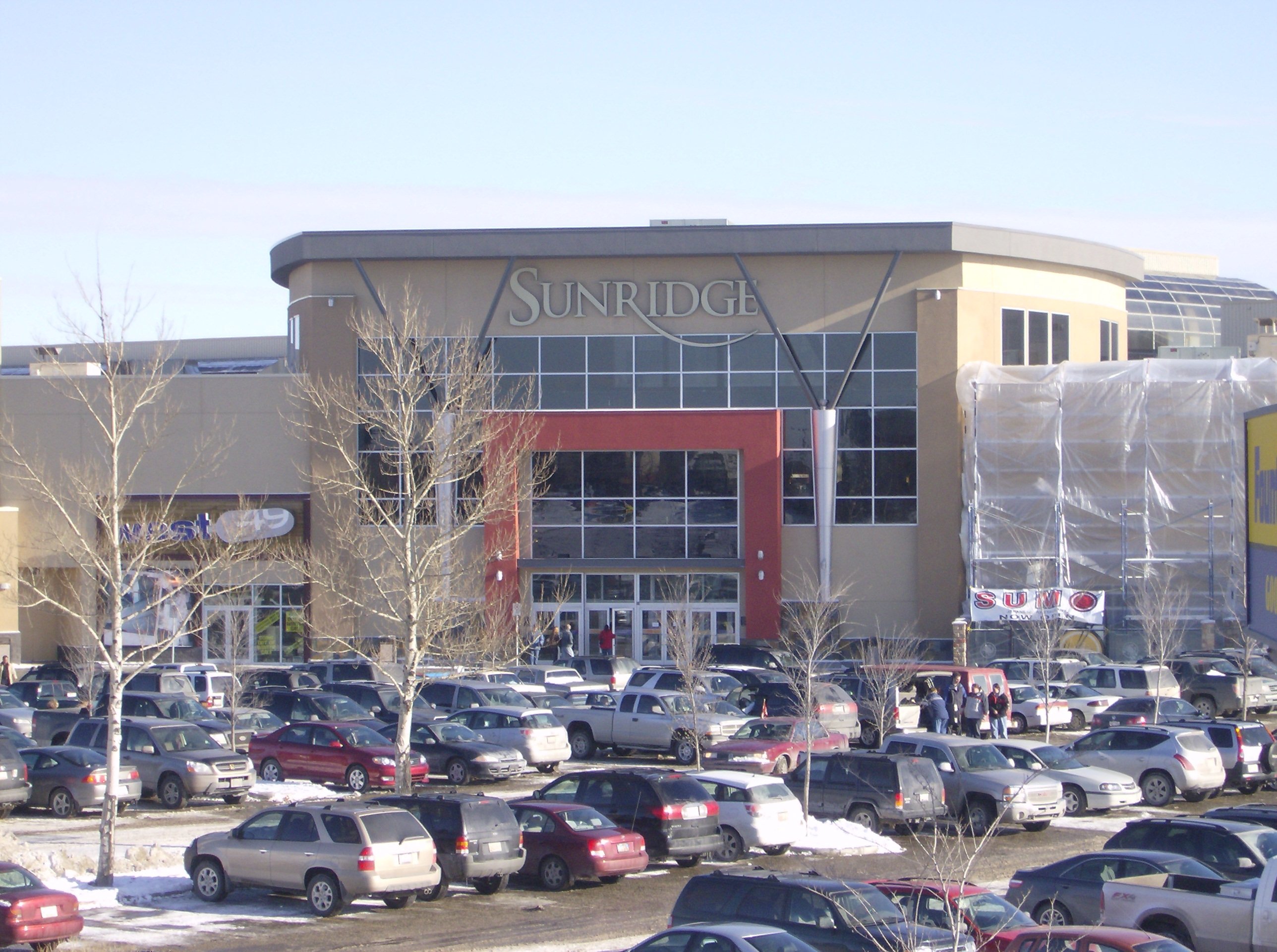
- Sunridge Mall
- Location: Calgary, Alberta, Canada
- Coordinates: 51°04′28″N 113°59′09″W
- Address: 2525 36 St NE
- Opened: October 1981
- Manager: Primaris REIT
- Owner: Primaris REIT
- Num. of stores: 170
- Num. of anchor tenants: 7
- Floor area: 830,599 sq ft (77,165.2 m^{2})
- Floors: 2
- Public transit: Rundle station
- Website: sunridgemall.com

Sunridge Mall is a major enclosed shopping mall in Calgary, Alberta containing 830,599 square feet / 77,165 m² of retail space. It is in the city's northeast quadrant, located at the corner of 36 Street NE and 20 Avenue NE, adjacent to the Rundle LRT station and the Peter Lougheed Centre. Sunridge Mall is owned and operated by Primaris Management Inc, a division of H&R REIT.

Location of Sunridge Mall in Calgary

Originally opened in October 1981, Sunridge Mall completed a $50 million renovation and expansion program.

It also operated an Easy Street before it closed down in 1996.

Sunridge Mall Christmas display, December 16, 2006

== See also ==
- List of shopping malls in Canada
