= Shawnessy, Calgary =

Shawnessy
- Neighbourhood
- Location of Shawnessy in Calgary
- Coordinates: 50°54′30″N 114°04′47″W
- Country: Canada
- Province: Alberta
- City: Calgary
- Quadrant: SW
- Ward: 13
- Established: 1981

Government
  - Mayor: Jeromy Farkas
  - Administrative body: Calgary City Council
  - Councillor: Dan McLean (Communities First)

Area
  - Total: 2.7 km^{2} (1.0 sq mi)
- Elevation: 1,060 m (3,480 ft)

Population (2011)
  - Total: 9,315
  - Density: 3,400/km^{2} (8,900/sq mi)
- Area code: 403
- Website: Shawnessy Community Association

Shawnessy is a suburban residential neighbourhood in the southwest quadrant of Calgary, Alberta. It is bounded by Shawnessy Boulevard to the north, Macleod Trail to the east, 162 Avenue S to the south and James McKevitt Road to the west.

Shawnessy was established in 1981. It is represented in the Calgary City Council by the Ward 13 councillor.

It is served by the Shawnessy station of the C-Train LRT system. Shawnessy Town Centre is a regional shopping area located east of the community.

== Demographics ==
In the City of Calgary's 2021 municipal census, Shawnessy had a population of 9,055 living in 3,255 dwellings With a land area of 3.7 km^{2} (1.4 sq mi), it had a population density of 2,450/km^{2} (6,340/sq mi) in 2021.

Residents in this community had a median household income of $105,000 in 2021, and 8% of Shawnessy residents were low-income. As of 2021, 42% of the residents were immigrants. A proportion of 6.1% of the buildings were condominiums or apartments, and 18% of the housing was used for renting. 18% of residents in Shawnessy spent 30%+ of their income on housing, compared to the Calgary average of 23%.

== Crime ==
In the May 2023-May 2024 data period, Shawnessy had a crime rate of 3.296/100, an increase from the previous data period.

This puts it at this comparison to other Calgary communities: Saddle Ridge (1.358/100), Whitehorn (1.741/100), Rundle (2.342/100), Brentwood (2.348/100), Acadia (2.542/100), Bowness (2.934/100), Shawnessy (3.296/100), Inglewood (3.438/100), Sunnyside (3.650/100), Marlborough (4.703/100), Southwood (5.147/100), Sunalta (5.307/100), Montgomery (5.483/100), Forest Lawn (6.528/100), Rosscarrock (7.049/100), Downtown Commercial Core (12.705/100), Downtown East Village (15.605/100), Manchester (43.368/100).

=== Crime data by year ===
Crime Data
| Year | Crime Rate (/100 pop.) |
|---|---|
| 2018 | 2.4 |
| 2019 | 2.5 |
| 2020 | 2.1 |
| 2021 | 2.0 |
| 2022 | 2.5 |
| 2023 | 2.4 |

== Education ==
The community is served by Father Doucet Elementary School (Calgary Catholic School District) and Janet Johnstone Elementary public school (Calgary Board of Education). A middle school named Samuel W. Shaw School (Calgary Board of Education) also serves the community.

== See also ==
- List of neighbourhoods in Calgary
