= Acadia, Calgary =

Acadia
- Neighbourhood
- Location of Acadia in Calgary
- Coordinates: 50°58′02″N 114°03′33″W
- Country: Canada
- Province: Alberta
- City: Calgary
- Quadrant: SE
- Ward: 9
- Established: 1960
- Annexed: 1956

Government
  - Mayor: Jeromy Farkas
  - Administrative body: Calgary City Council
  - Councillor: Harrison Clark (Independent)
- Elevation: 1,050 m (3,440 ft)

Population (2011)
  - Total: 10,615
- Website: Acadia Community Association

Acadia is a neighbourhood in the southeast quadrant of Calgary, Alberta. The area is bounded on the west by Macleod Trail, on the east by the Bow River, on the north by Heritage Drive and on the south by Southland Drive.

The land was annexed to the City of Calgary in 1956, and Acadia was established in 1960.

The neighbourhood's main street is Fairmount Drive, and many of the area's businesses cluster along the street. The area also contains Lord Beaverbrook High School, the city's largest high school.

== Demographics ==
In the City of Calgary's 2021 municipal census, Acadia had a population of 9,915 living in 5,053 dwellings With a land area of 3.9 km^{2} (1.5 sq mi), it had a population density of 2,540/km^{2} (6,580/sq mi) in 2021.

Residents in this community had a median household income of $72,500 in 2021, and there were 12% low income residents living in Acadia. As of 2021, 23% of the residents were immigrants. A proportion of 38.8% of the buildings were condominiums or apartments, and 44% were used for renting.

Pop. Overtime
Year	Population
2014	10969
2015	11053
2016	10767
2017	10660
2018	10584
2019	10520
2021	9915

== Crime ==
In the May 2023-May 2024 data period, Acadia had a crime rate of 2.542/100, a decrease from the previous data period.

This puts it at this comparison to other Calgary communities: Saddle Ridge (1.358/100), Whitehorn (1.741/100), Rundle (2.342/100), Brentwood (2.348/100), Acadia (2.542/100), Bowness (2.934/100), Shawnessy (3.296/100), Inglewood (3.438/100), Sunnyside (3.650/100), Marlborough (4.703/100), Southwood (5.147/100), Sunalta (5.307/100), Montgomery (5.483/100), Forest Lawn (6.528/100), Rosscarrock (7.049/100), Downtown Commercial Core (12.705/100), Downtown East Village (15.605/100), Manchester (43.368/100).

=== Crime data by year ===
Crime Data
Year	Crime Rate
2018	3.4 /100
2019	4.3 /100
2020	3.3 /100
2021	2.0 /100
2022	3.1 /100
2023	2.7 /100

== Education ==
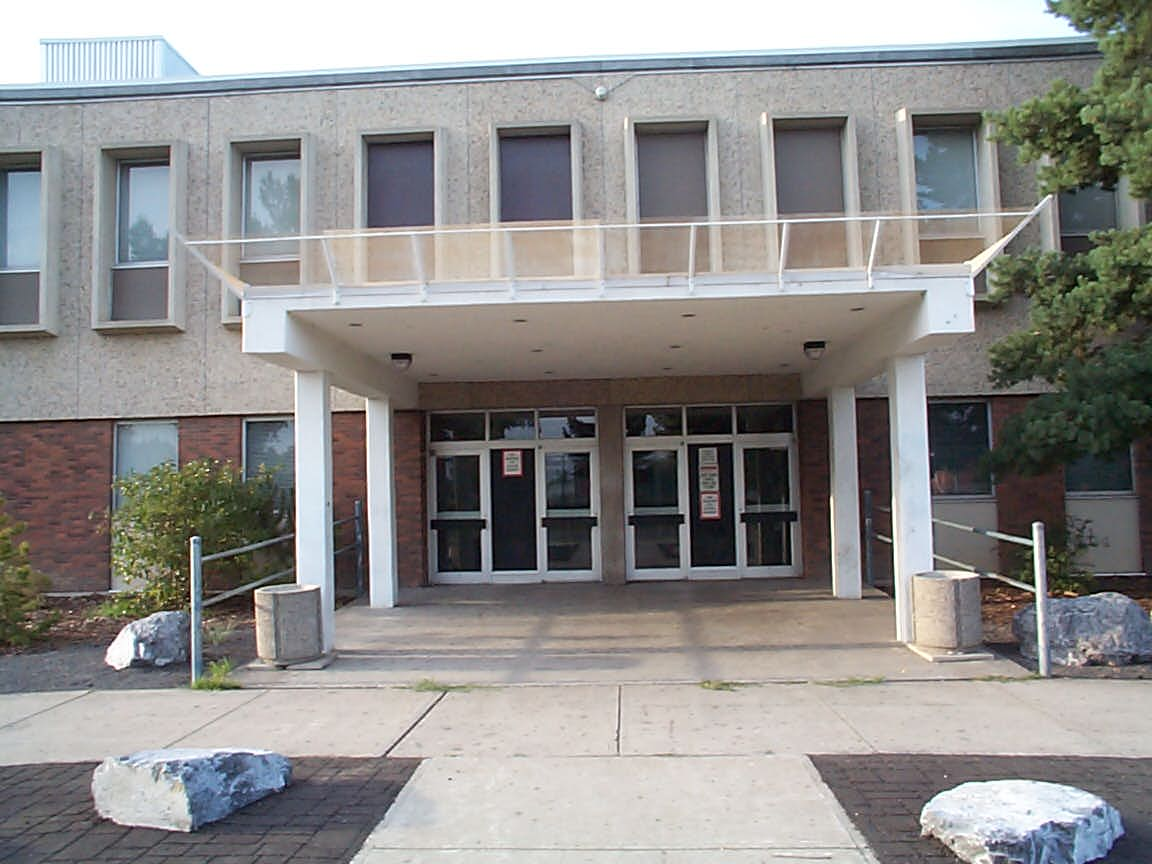
Lord Beaverbrook High School

The following schools are located in Acadia:

- Public schools:
  - Acadia Elementary
  - Alice M. Curtis Elementary - Public
  - Andrew Davison Bilingual Elementary - Public
  - David Thompson Junior High - Public
  - Ecole de la Source - Francophone
  - Fred Parker Elementary
  - Lord Beaverbrook Senior High
  - Foundations for the Future
- Catholic schools:
  - Ecole St. Cecilia Bilingual Elementary
  - Ecole St. Matthew Elementary & Junior High

== Transit ==
Acadia is served by Calgary Transit Bus Route 99. The Heritage CTrain Station serves Acadia. Route 10 serves north and south via Fairmont Dr.

== See also ==
- List of neighbourhoods in Calgary
