= Sunnyside, Calgary =

Sunnyside
- Neighbourhood
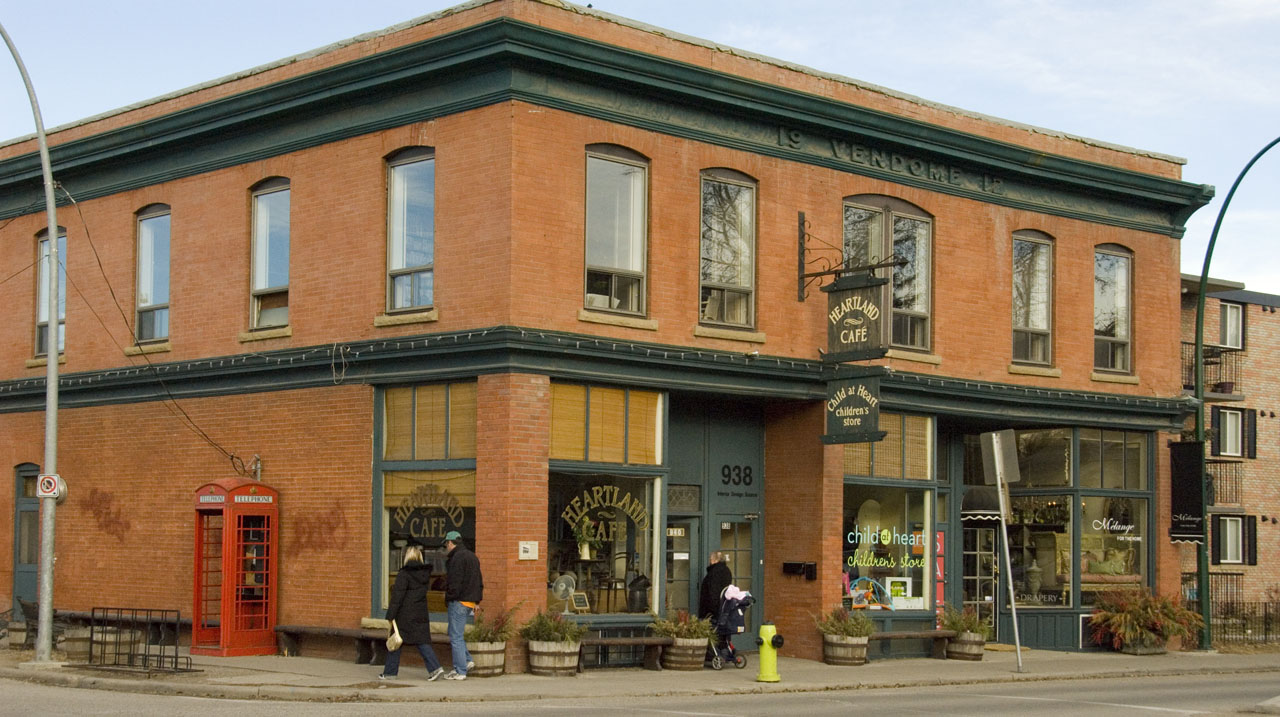
- The Heartland Cafe (Now Vendome Cafe)

- Location of Sunnyside in Calgary
- Coordinates: 51°03′10″N 114°05′09″W
- Country: Canada
- Province: Alberta
- City: Calgary
- Quadrant: NW
- Ward: 7
- Established: 1904

Government
  - Mayor: Jeromy Farkas
  - Administrative body: Calgary City Council
  - Councillor: Myke Atkinson (Independent)
- Elevation: 1,050 m (3,440 ft)

Population (2006)
  - Total: 3,598
  - Average Income: $42,325
- Website: Hillhurst-Sunnyside Community Association

Sunnyside is an innercity community in Calgary, Alberta located on the north side of the Bow River immediately adjacent to Calgary's downtown. The community partners with the neighbouring community of Hillhurst to form the Hillhurst-Sunnyside Community Association. The combined communities have an area redevelopment plan in place, revised in 2009.

Kensington is a Business Revitalization Zone adjacent to the communities of Hillhurst and Sunnyside. It is an active family-friendly commercial area, abundant with amenities.

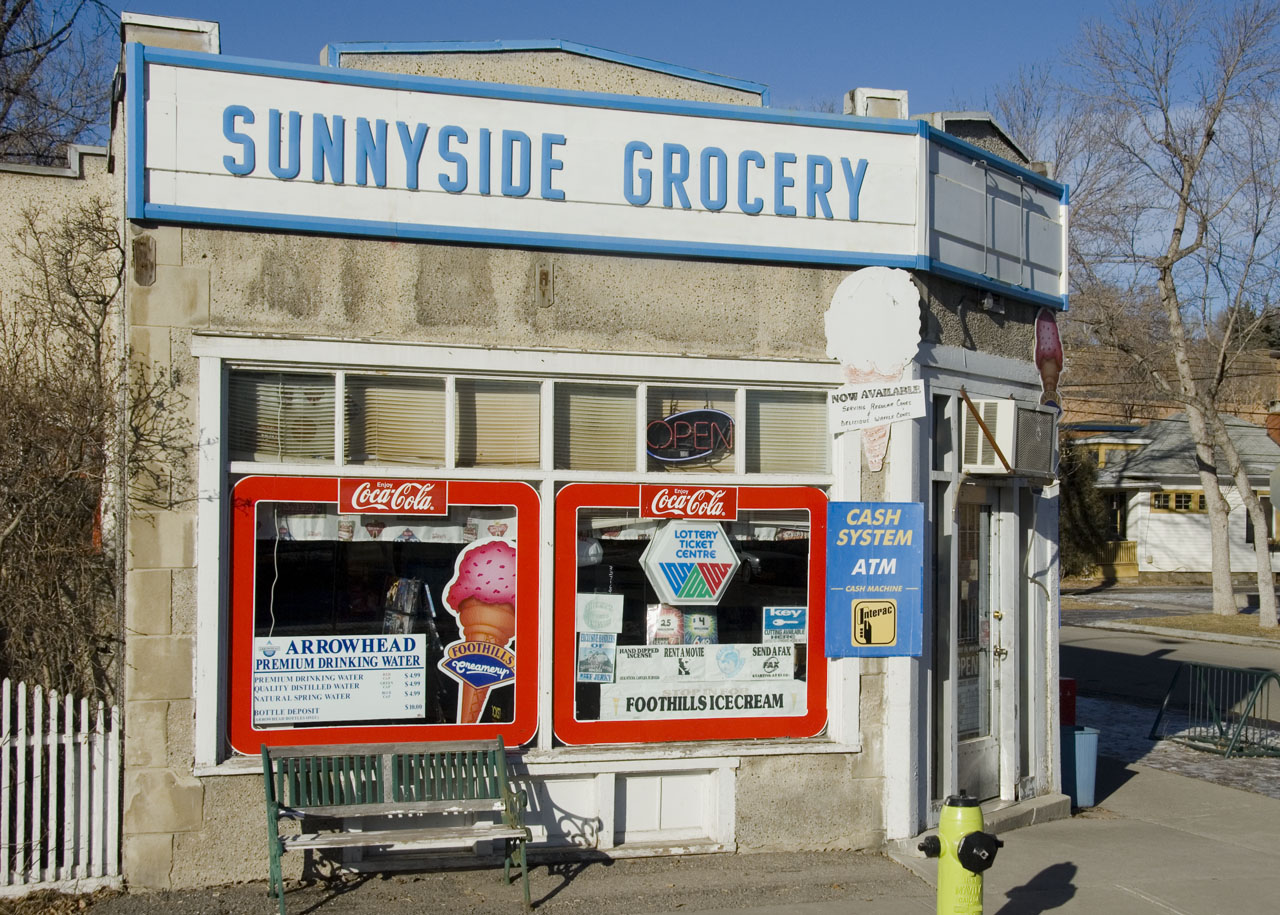
Sunnyside Grocery (demolished in 2018)

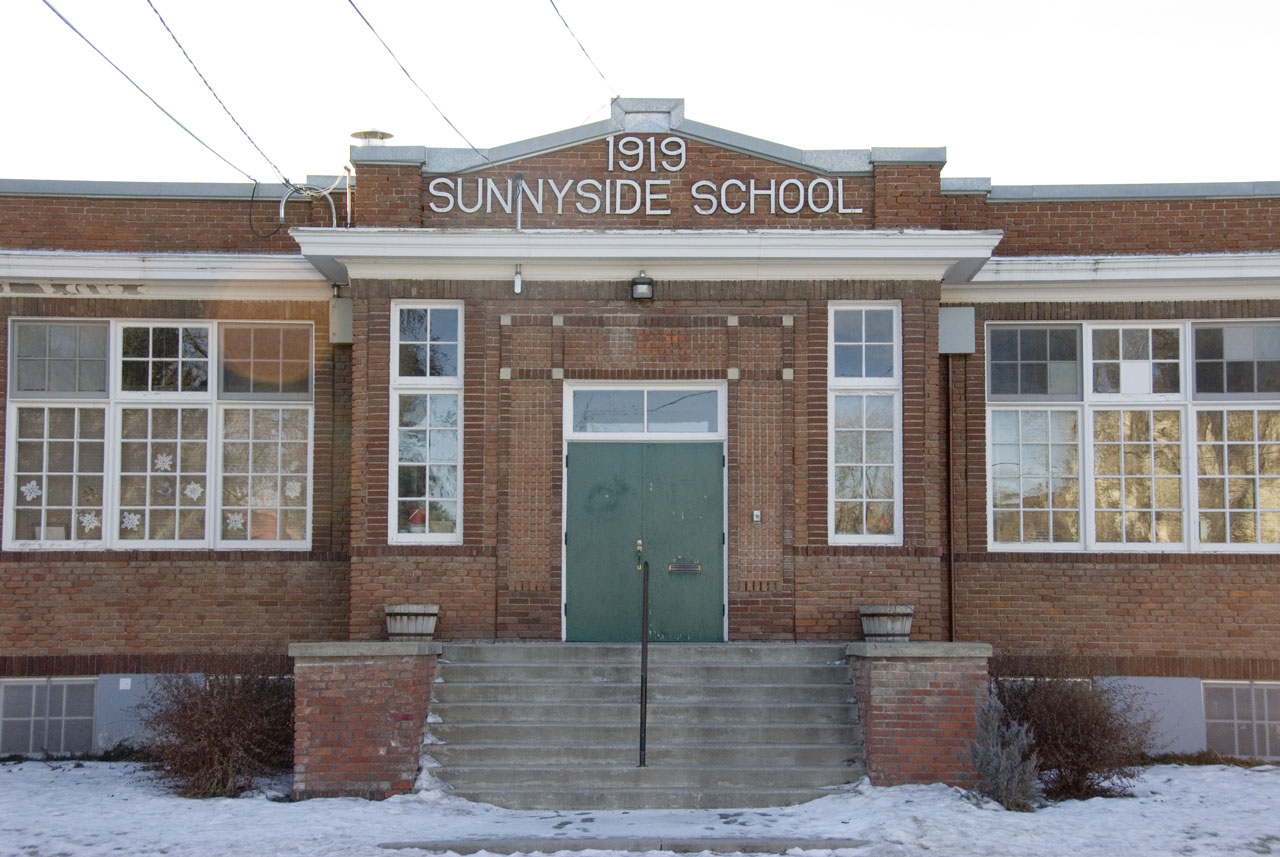
Sunnyside Community School

== History ==
Sunnyside is one of Calgary's oldest communities. Originally settled by homesteaders in the 1880s, the land was purchased by the City of Calgary and incorporated into the city proper in 1904. Although the majority of the original residents of Sunnyside were Canadian Pacific Railway and Eau Claire Sawmill employees, the community now mainly attracts urban professionals and their families due to its quiet neighbourhood atmosphere and close proximity to Calgary's active downtown.

Beginning in 1913, streetcars were the main means of transport within the city. One of the lines traveled east through Sunnyside on 2 Avenue to pick up workers for the CPR. It then went up the hill to the north end of the Centre Street Bridge. There, the workers caught another streetcar to downtown. The area where the streetcar went up the embankment is now part of Calgary's paved pathway system; it begins behind the Calgary Curling Club, passes underneath the McHugh Bluff stairs and onwards to the top of the bluff.

Sunnyside was one of numerous Calgary neighbourhoods that suffered major damage in the Bow River flood of June 2013, with the community completely evacuated for a number of days.

== Geography ==
Sunnyside is bounded by Centre Street on the east and by 10th Street NW on the west. On the north Sunnyside is bounded by McHugh Bluff and on the south by the Bow River.

Major roads that pass through Sunnyside include 10th Street NW (North-South Traffic) and Memorial Drive (East-West Traffic). Most of the traffic on these major roads is either entering or exiting the downtown and not generated by the community itself. Consequently, the City of Calgary has taken specific traffic measures such as banning left hand turns for southbound 10th Street traffic in the morning and banning right hand turns onto most streets for westbound Memorial Drive in the afternoon. The main artery within the neighbourhood is 2nd Avenue NW.

Sunnyside, like the communities of Eau Claire, Chinatown, East Village and Inglewood, sits on the flood plain of the Bow River. Infrastructure is in place to mitigate flooding in Sunnyside but the risk of flood damage remains. A berm along Memorial Drive and the Bearspaw Dam upstream provide some protection but proved not enough in June 2013. The berm was over topped in two areas and the Bearspaw Dam reservoir storage capacity was too small to prevent this large flood.

In 1932, Sunnyside experienced widespread flooding.

In June 2005 when exceptionally heavy rainfalls combined with the regular rise in the Bow River caused by snow melting in the mountains. Storm sewer outflows were closed off to prevent the Bow River from flooding the neighbourhood, leaving the heavy rainfall to collect in the neighbourhood. The result were some basement flooding and parts of Memorial Drive being closed to traffic.

In March 2009, a similar incident occurred when heavy wet snow that fell overnight melted quickly during the day. With the outflows once again closed off, this time to prevent flow in from the Bow River that could occur from winter ice dams, the water flowing down from upper plateau communities quickly accumulated in Sunnyside. Several homes on 1 Ave NW between 5A Street NW and 6 Street NW experienced basement flooding.

On June 20 to 24 2013, Sunnyside was impacted by the 2013 Alberta floods. Three factors contributed to the flooding: 1. High river flow of the Bow River, over topping the flood berm, increasing the water table level and the flowing into Outfalls that hadn't been closed in time or couldn't be closed. 2. Intense rain that fell in the neighbourhood in a short period of time 3. Storm Sewer that flowed from upper plateau neighbourhoods into Sunnyside.

On July 5, 2013, Sunnyside was impacted again by flooding. This time the cause was intense rain that fell in nearby upper plateau neighbourhoods and the fact that storm sewer outfall gates were closed and did not provide enough opening to release the water.

== Architecture ==
Sunnyside's architecture is a mixed array of designs and styles each telling a story of the neighbourhood's history. Sunnyside has a blend of single-family dwellings, modern mid-rise high-density housing, neighbourhood corner stores and restaurants, and walk-up apartment buildings.

In the 1880s, the Canadian Pacific Railway constructed “workers’ cottages" on 25-foot lots, which they rented to CPR employees. The cottages were wood framed and had cellars that were prone to flooding. Early residents describes the community's houses as good, ordinary homes for working-class people. The community had wooden sidewalks, dirt roads, water from wells and springs, milk straight from cows and flooding in the spring. There were no lights, gas, sewers or stores.

Over the years many of these cottages have been torn down and replaced with new buildings representative of the trends of the day. The cottages that remain have all been upgraded with modern conveniences and utilities.

The 1970s high oil prices brought a new wave of construction to Sunnyside. Many of the cottages and homes were torn down and replaced with one and two bedroom apartment buildings. Most of these concrete and brick buildings were upgraded and turned into condominiums.

== Demographics ==
In the City of Calgary's 2012 municipal census, Sunnyside had a population of 3,704 living in 2,340 dwellings, a -1.3% increase from its 2011 population of 3,751. With a land area of 1 km^{2} (0.39 sq mi), it had a population density of 3,700/km^{2} (10,000/sq mi) in 2012.

Sunnyside is primarily a residential area with the majority of land used for single family homes, apartments and condominiums. The 2006 Calgary Census indicated Sunnyside had a population of 3,740 individuals of which slightly more than half were living in non-family situations. 48.7% of the population is between the ages of 20 and 34, and 43.2% of the population has some form of university degree. In 2006, Sunnyside residents had a mean income of $42,325 a year.

== Crime ==
In the May 2023-May 2024 data period, Sunnyside had a crime rate of 3.650/100, an increase from the previous data period.

This puts it at this comparison to other Calgary communities: Saddle Ridge (1.358/100), Whitehorn (1.741/100), Rundle (2.342/100), Brentwood (2.348/100), Acadia (2.542/100), Bowness (2.934/100), Shawnessy (3.296/100), Inglewood (3.438/100), Sunnyside (3.650/100), Marlborough (4.703/100), Southwood (5.147/100), Sunalta (5.307/100), Montgomery (5.483/100), Forest Lawn (6.528/100), Rosscarrock (7.049/100), Downtown Commercial Core (12.705/100), Downtown East Village (15.605/100), Manchester (43.368/100).

=== Crime Data by Year ===
Year	Crime Rate (/100 pop.)
2018	4.2
2019	6.3
2020	5.5
2021	4.1
2022	4.6
2023	3.6

== Amenities ==
Sunnyside has an elementary school, a station on the C-Train (Calgary's Light Rail Transit system), and a grocery store as well as many popular restaurants, coffee shops, and boutique stores.

Grocery stores include Safeway Inc. and the Sunnyside Market.

Sunnyside is home to the Calgary Curling Club. The club is located at the east end of the neighbourhood.

Sunnyside has a community centre that is located in neighbouring community of Hillhurst. It is located at 1320 – 5 Ave NW.

== Community Association ==
Sunnyside's community association is known as the Hillhurst-Sunnyside Community Association and was reportedly established in 1942. Their mandate is to provide and organize sports, recreational and social activities, and act as an advocacy group for the community's interests on planning and other civic issues.

In the 1970s the integrity of neighbourhood was threatened by proposed high-speed transportation routes and by increasing land development. It was proposed that Memorial Drive become a major highway and an interchange be built where Memorial Drive and 10th Street NW intersect today. The Louise Bridge would be replaced by two new bridges; a southbound bridge aligning to 10th Street NW and a northbound bridge aligning to 9A Street. The association adopted an activist approach, and succeeded in blocking the interchange plans and retaining much of the traditional small-scale quality of the community.

In the 1980s a new transportation development was proposed. Calgary's light rail transportation line was proposed to replace 9A Street NW and many homes were to be demolished to make way. This proposal did go through and in 1987 the Sunnyside Station was completed but not before many changes and concessions were made by city planners. While not all the homes and buildings were torn down, many of them were left with no front access point, instead relying on the alleyway.

Today the association remains involved in the review of development plans through its Community Environment Committee.

== Politics ==
Municipally, Sunnyside is in the Calgary City Council electoral division of Ward 7, represented by Councillor Druh Farrell. Provincially, Sunnyside is in the electoral district of Calgary-Mountain View, and its Member of the Legislative Assembly is Kathleen Ganley of the Alberta New Democratic Party. Federally, Sunnyside is in the electoral district (or riding) of Calgary Confederation and its Member of Parliament is Len Webber of the Conservative Party of Canada.

== See also ==
- List of neighbourhoods in Calgary
