= Rundle, Calgary =

Rundle
- Neighbourhood
- Location of Rundle in Calgary
- Coordinates: 51°04′27″N 113°58′12″W
- Country: Canada
- Province: Alberta
- City: Calgary
- Quadrant: NE
- Ward: 5
- Established: 1973
- Annexed: 1961

Government
  - Mayor: Jeromy Farkas
  - Administrative body: Calgary City Council
  - Councillor: Andre Chabot (Communities First)

Area
  - Total: 2.6 km^{2} (1.0 sq mi)
- Elevation: 1,085 m (3,560 ft)

Population (2021)
  - Total: 10,545
  - Average Income: $83,000
- Postal code: T1Y
- Website: Rundle Community Association

Rundle is a residential neighbourhood in the northeast quadrant of Calgary, Alberta. It is bounded by 32 Avenue NE to the north, 16 Avenue NE (Trans-Canada Highway) to the south, 52 Street NE to the east and 36 Street NE to the west. The Sunridge Mall is located immediately west of the neighbourhood. Rundle is home to a large Lebanese group.

Rundle was established in 1973 and was named after Robert Terrill Rundle, a missionary who worked in Western Canada in the mid-19th century. (Rundle is actually one of four communities built in the 1970s in NE Calgary. These four communities together are known as "The Properties", and all four were named after nearby mountains: Mounts Rundle, Pineridge, Whitehorn and Temple). It is represented in the Calgary City Council by the Ward 10 councillor.

The community is served by the Rundle station of the C-Train LRT system. The postal code in this area is T1Y.

== Demographics ==
In the City of Calgary's 2021 municipal census, Rundle had a population of 10,545 living in 3,410 dwellings With a land area of 2.6 km^{2} (1.0 sq mi), it had a population density of 4,060/km^{2} (10,500/sq mi) in 2021.

Residents in this community had a median household income of $83,000 in 2021, and there were 12% low income residents living in the neighbourhood. As of 2021, 49% of the residents were immigrants. A proportion of 1.1% of the buildings were condominiums or apartments, and 29% of the housing was used for renting. There is a significant Arab and Muslim, particularly Lebanese population in this neighbourhood. The largest demographic group in Rundle is Filipino.

== Crime ==
In the May 2023-May 2024 data period, Rundle had a crime rate of 2.342/100, a decrease from the data period before.

This puts it at this comparison to other Calgary communities: Saddle Ridge (1.358/100), Whitehorn (1.741/100), Rundle (2.342/100), Brentwood (2.348/100), Acadia (2.542/100), Bowness (2.934/100), Shawnessy (3.296/100), Inglewood (3.438/100), Sunnyside (3.650/100), Marlborough (4.703/100), Southwood (5.147/100), Sunalta (5.307/100), Montgomery (5.483/100), Forest Lawn (6.528/100), Rosscarrock (7.049/100), Downtown Commercial Core (12.705/100), Downtown East Village (15.605/100), Manchester (43.368/100).

=== Crime data by year ===
Crime Data
Year	Crime Rate (/100)
2018	3.5
2019	3.5
2020	3.0
2021	3.0
2022	3.5
2023	2.7

== Education ==
The community is served by Rundle Elementary, Cecil Swanson Elementary, Dr. Gordon Higgins Junior High public schools and by St. Rupert Elementary and St. Rose of Lima Elementary and Junior High Catholic schools. The designated high school is Lester B Pearson High School.

== See also ==
- List of neighbourhoods in Calgary
