= Whitehorn, Calgary =

Whitehorn
- Neighbourhood
- Location of Whitehorn in Calgary
- Coordinates: 51°05′04″N 113°58′08″W
- Country: Canada
- Province: Alberta
- City: Calgary
- Quadrant: NE
- Ward: 5
- Established: 1973
- Annexed: 1961

Government
  - Mayor: Jeromy Farkas
  - Administrative body: Calgary City Council
  - Councillor: Raj Dhaliwal (Independent)

Area
  - Total: 2.7 km^{2} (1.0 sq mi)
- Elevation: 1,095 m (3,593 ft)

Population (2021)
  - Total: 11,085
  - Average Income: $88,000
- Postal code: T1Y
- Website: Whitehorn Community Association

Whitehorn is a residential neighbourhood in the northeast quadrant of Calgary, Alberta. It is bounded by McKnight Boulevard to the north, 52 Street NE to the east, 32 Avenue NE to the south and 36 Street NE to the west. The Peter Lougheed Centre is located southwest from the neighbourhood.

The area was annexed by the City of Calgary in 1961 and the community was established in 1973. It is represented in the Calgary City Council by the Ward 10 councillor.

The community is served by the Whitehorn station of the C-Train LRT system. The postal code in this area is T1Y.

Whitehorn also has a number of public schools in the area, including Annie Gale Junior High School and J. Fred Scott School for K-6.

== History ==
The land that is currently Whitehorn was proposed under the name of "Warwick Park" in the early 1910s. However this was never developed initially due to the Great Depression, in which Calgary's development slowed significantly.

The land that would later become Whitehorn would be annexed by the city of Calgary in 1961. With Whitehorn being established and developed starting in 1973.

Whitehorn, alongside Temple, Pineridge, and Rundle were all developed under a cluster called "The Properties", where each of their names ended with "Properties". It is not known when Whitehorn Properties was renamed Whitehorn.

== Demographics ==
In the City of Calgary's 2021 municipal census, Whitehorn had a population of 11,085 living in 3,465 dwellings. With a land area of 2.6 km^{2} (1.0 sq mi), it had a population density of 4,260/km^{2} (11,040/sq mi) in 2024.

Residents in Whitehorn had a median household income of $88,000 in 2021, and there were 10% low income residents living Whitehorn. As of 2021, 49% of the residents were immigrants, most of Vietnamese and East Indian origin. Most buildings were single-family detached homes and semi-detached, and 29% of the housing was used for renting. 20% of Whitehorn residents spent 30%+ of their incomes on housing, less than the Calgary average of 23%.

== Crime ==
In the May 2023-May 2024 data period, Whitehorn had a crime rate of 1.741/100, a decrease from the previous data period.

This puts it at this comparison to other Calgary communities: Saddle Ridge (1.358/100), Whitehorn (1.741/100), Rundle (2.342/100), Brentwood (2.348/100), Acadia (2.542/100), Bowness (2.934/100), Shawnessy (3.296/100), Inglewood (3.438/100), Sunnyside (3.650/100), Marlborough (4.703/100), Southwood (5.147/100), Sunalta (5.307/100), Montgomery (5.483/100), Forest Lawn (6.528/100), Rosscarrock (7.049/100), Downtown Commercial Core (12.705/100), Downtown East Village (15.605/100), Manchester (43.368/100).

=== Crime Data by Year ===
Crime Data
Year	Crime Rate
2018	3.3 /100
2019	2.9 /100
2020	2.6 /100
2021	1.8 /100
2022	2.2 /100
2023	1.9 /100

== Education ==
The community is served by Annie Gale Junior High, Chief Justice Milvain Elementary and Colonel J. Fred Scott Elementary public schools, as well as St. Wilfrid Elementary (Catholic).

== See also ==
- List of neighbourhoods in Calgary
