= Marlborough, Calgary =

Marlborough
- Neighbourhood
- Location of Marlborough in Calgary
- Coordinates: 51°03′34″N 113°58′05″W
- Country: Canada
- Province: Alberta
- City: Calgary
- Quadrant: NE
- Ward: 10
- Established: 1967

Government
  - Mayor: Jeromy Farkas
  - Administrative body: Calgary City Council
  - Councillor: Andre Chabot (Communities First)
- Elevation: 1,075 m (3,527 ft)

Population (2021)
  - Total: 8,910
  - Average Income: $80,000
- Postal code: T2A
- Website: Calgary Marlborough Community Association

Marlborough is a residential neighbourhood in the northeast quadrant of Calgary, Alberta. It is bounded by the 16 Avenue NE (Trans-Canada Highway) to the north, 52 Street NE to the east, Memorial Drive to the south and 36 Street NE to the west.

The community is served by the Marlborough station of the C-Train LRT system, and Marlborough Mall is located in the southwest corner of the neighbourhood.

Marlborough was established in 1967, and was named after Marlborough, England. It is represented in the Calgary City Council by the Ward 10 councillor.

The community is very diverse and has residents from a variety of cultural backgrounds.

The postal code in this area is T2A.

== History ==
The northwest corner of the district was largely undeveloped when the community was first developed; a small motel was in existence on the southeast corner of 16th Avenue and 36th Street NE and a large open field was used for industrial/oilfield storage into the 1970s. The creation of a clover leaf exchange in the early 1970s at that intersection saw the motel demolished. In the 1990s, the final major residential development occurred as houses were added to the western portion of Marlyn Way.

== Community ==
=== Community Association ===
To provide community facilities and services to the residents of Marlborough, the Calgary Marlborough Community Association is a volunteer organization which represents the interests and meets the needs of the residents within the community.

The Marlborough Community Association has website and an Instagram page.

== Demographics ==
In the City of Calgary's 2021 municipal census, Marlborough had a population of 8,910 living in 3,060 dwellings with a land area of 2.7 km^{2} (1.0 sq mi), it had a population density of 3,300/km^{2} (8,550/sq mi) in 2021.

Residents in this community had a median household income of $80,000 in 2021, and 11% of Marlborough residents were low-income. As of 2021, 50% of the residents were immigrants. 23% of Marlborough residents spent 30% or more of their income on shelter, about on par with the Calgary city-wide average; and 35% of the housing was used for renting.

Marlborough's population distribution by age in 2024

0-14 years: 18%
15-64 years: 65%
65-84 years: 15%
85+ years: 1%

Pop. Overtime
| Year | Population |
|---|---|
| 2014 | 8989 |
| 2015 | 9080 |
| 2016 | 8784 |
| 2017 | 9226 |
| 2018 | 9049 |
| 2019 | 9162 |
| 2021 | 8910 |

== Crime ==
Despite Marlborough's local reputation as being a bad area, the community's crime rate does not reflect this.

In the May 2023-May 2024 data period, Marlborough had a crime rate of 4.703/100, an increase from the previous data period. This puts it as worse than Inglewood (3.428/100), Sunnyside (3.650/100), and better than Southwood (5.147/100), Forest Lawn (6.528/100), and Rosscarrock (7.049/100).

=== Crime Data by Year ===
Crime Data
| Year | Crime Rate |
|---|---|
| 2018 | 4.8 /100 |
| 2019 | 4.2 /100 |
| 2020 | 3.1 /100 |
| 2021 | 3.2 /100 |
| 2022 | 4.9 /100 |
| 2023 | 4.5 /100 |

== Education ==
=== Public schools ===
==== High School Out Reach Programs ====
- Discovering Choices

==== Junior high schools ====
- Bob Edwards Junior High

==== Elementary schools ====
- Chris Akkerman Elementary
- Marlborough Elementary
- St. Mark Elementary School(catholic)

== See also ==
- List of neighbourhoods in Calgary
