= Inglewood, Calgary =

Inglewood
- Neighbourhood
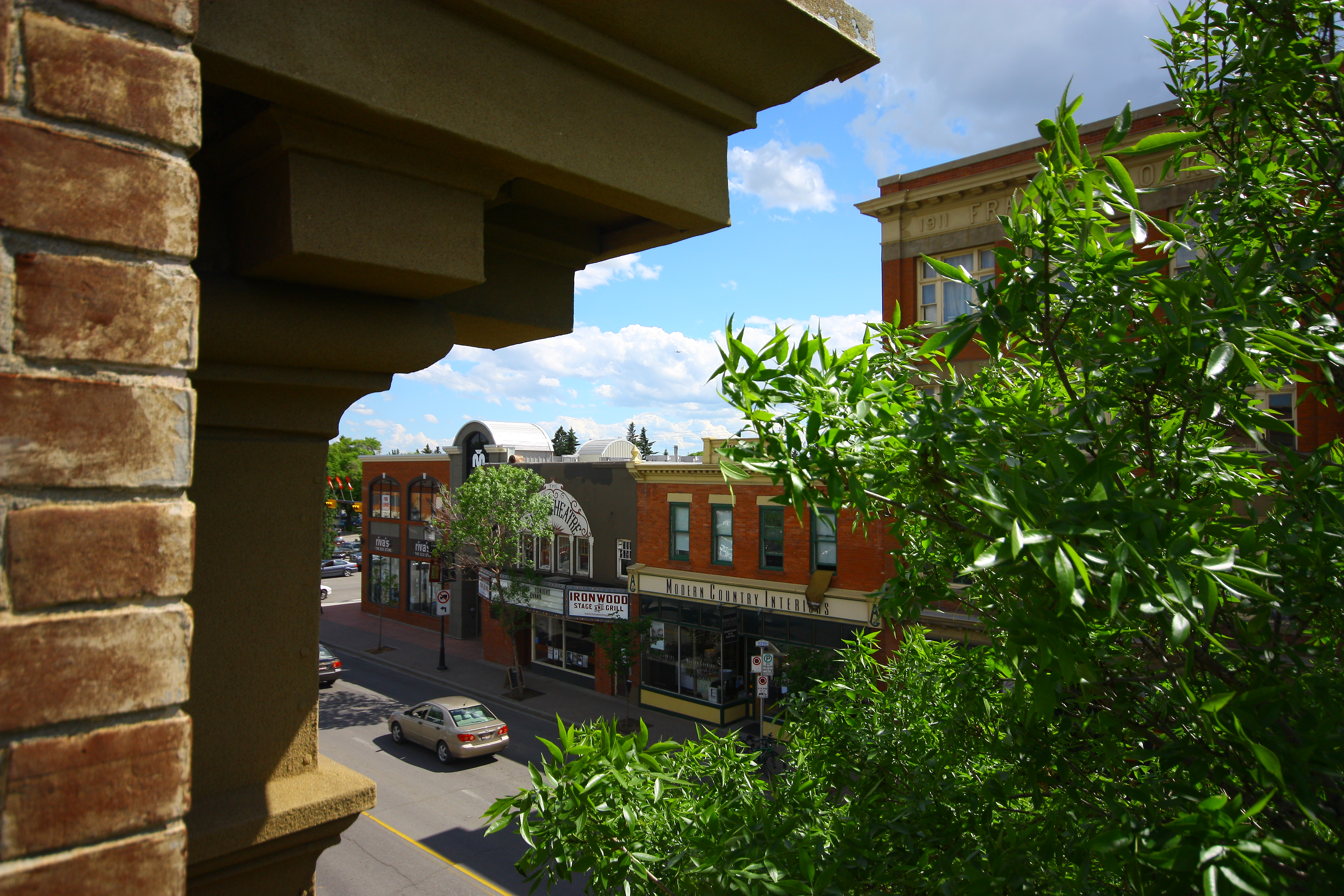

- Location of Inglewood in Calgary
- Coordinates: 51°02′34″N 114°02′22″W
- Country: Canada
- Province: Alberta
- City: Calgary
- Quadrant: SE
- Ward: 9
- Established: 1875
- Annexed: 1911

Government
  - Mayor: Jeromy Farkas
  - Administrative body: Calgary City Council
  - Councillor: Harrison Clark
- Elevation: 1,040 m (3,410 ft)

Population (2021)
  - Total: 4,130
  - Average Income: $87,000
- Website: Inglewood Community Association

Inglewood is an urban neighbourhood in central Calgary, Alberta, Canada, centred on 9th Avenue SE for several blocks east of the Elbow River and downtown. It also contains the Business Revitalization Zone of Inglewood.

It is represented in the Calgary City Council by the Ward 9 councillor, Harrison Clark.

The postal code in this area is T2G.

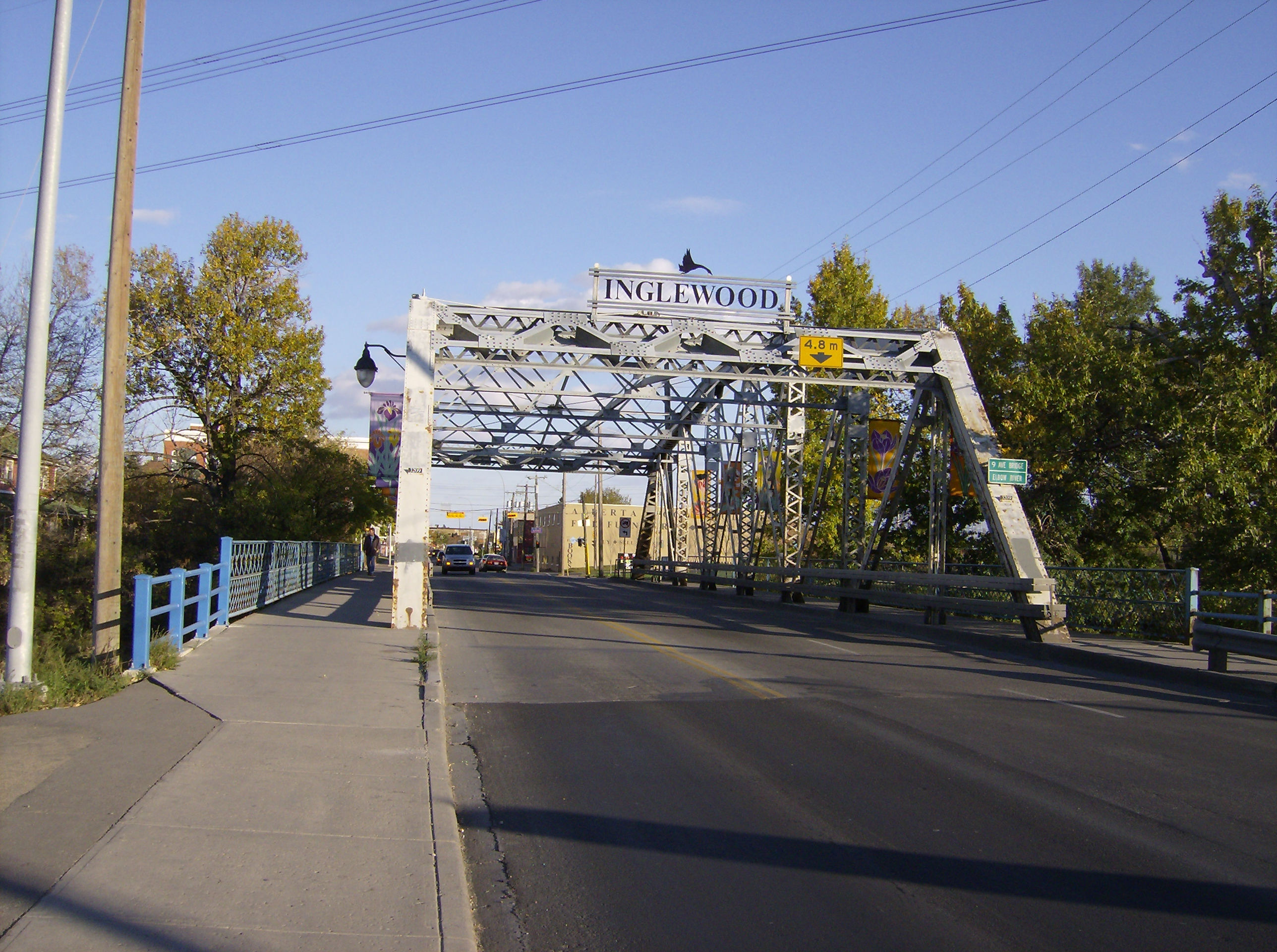
Former bridge into Inglewood from downtown, replaced in 2022

== History ==
Inglewood has the distinction of being Calgary's oldest neighbourhood and it is immediately across the Elbow river from Fort Calgary. The community was established in 1875 after the fort was built. It was developed by a group headed by Acheson Irvine, Major John Stewart and James Macleod. Ninth Avenue (formerly Atlantic Avenue) was probably the first "main street" in the city. Today, the neighbourhood is a shopping and arts district. It is also home to the Inglewood Bird Sanctuary, an urban wildlife refuge. Originally known as East Calgary or Brewery Flats, the community was not officially given the name Inglewood until 1911, when it was named after the nearby homestead established by Colonel James Walker. (Walker also was responsible for setting aside the lands later used by the bird sanctuary).

The community was placed under a mandatory evacuation order during the 2013 Alberta floods.

In 2020, Calgary City Council approved the construction of Inglewood/Ramsay Station, part of the Calgary Green Line. The station will be elevated over 12 Street SE alongside the freight tracks, near the intersection of 11 Avenue SE / 12 Street SE. Construction will begin early 2021.

== Demographics ==
In the City of Calgary's 2012 municipal census, Inglewood had a population of 3,564 living in 2,241 dwellings, a 2.6% increase from its 2011 population of 3,473. With a land area of 2.5 km^{2} (0.97 sq mi), it had a population density of 1,426/km^{2} (3,690/sq mi) in 2012.

Residents in this community had a median household income of $47,040 in 2000, and there were 20.8% low income residents living in the neighbourhood. As of 2000, 12.7% of the residents were immigrants. A proportion of 32.8% of the buildings were condominiums or apartments, and 36.2% of the housing was used for renting.

== Crime ==
Inglewood went through a period of decline throughout the 1900s following industrial decline, but has rebounded over-time with it becoming a popular tourist destination.

=== Crime data by year ===
Crime Data
Year	Crime Rate
2018	4.1 /100
2019	4.1 /100
2020	5.2 /100
2021	3.9 /100
2022	5.1 /100
2023	4.4 /100

== Attractions ==
The district of Inglewood contains or is adjacent to a number of tourist attractions including Fort Calgary Historic Park, the Wilder Institute/Calgary Zoo, and the historic Deane House. The north boundary of the district is lined by the Bow River pathway.

Today, Inglewood promotes an arts and culture-filled district with more than 100 shops, boutiques, eateries and a host of breweries attracting locals and tourists alike. It has been referred to as Calgary's hub of local music, known as Music Mile, thanks to venues like the Ironwood Stage and Grill (formerly The Garry Theatre), The Blues Can, and the headquarters for the Calgary International Folk Festival.

Inglewood is also home to Sunfest, a one-day affair that attracts more than 30,000 people to the community for activities such as outdoor shopping, live musical performances and a country-themed celebrity pie-eating competition. Sunfest is generally held on the last Saturday in July each year. Since 2007, Inglewood has hosted the Bleak Midwinter Film Festival, founded by Inglewood residents Wendy Tilby and Amanda Forbis. Additionally, the neighbourhood is home to the Calgary International Fringe Festival, the International Festival of Animated Objects and numerous stage performances, live music acts and art exhibitions throughout the year.

Since Inglewood is in an environmentally sensitive area at the confluence of the Elbow and the Bow rivers, it is also home to several nature preserves. These include the Inglewood Bird Sanctuary, the Bow Habitat Station, Inglewood Wildlands Park, Pearce Estate Park, and the Sam Livingston Fish Hatchery. Another attraction of Inglewood is the direct access via 9th ave to downtown Calgary, Deerfoot Trail and International Avenue (17 Ave SE).

== Recreational ==
Inglewood is also home to the Inglewood Aquatic Centre. This facility was built and opened in 1963 originally as an outdoor pool. Several years later it was enclosed so that it would be usable year-round. The land for the site of this swimming pool was donated to the City of Calgary by the Calgary Brewing and Malting Company Limited.

The Inglewood Aquatic Centre has a number of features and amenities.
