= Bridgeland/Riverside =

Bridgeland/Riverside Bridgeland-Riverside Bridgeland
- Neighbourhood
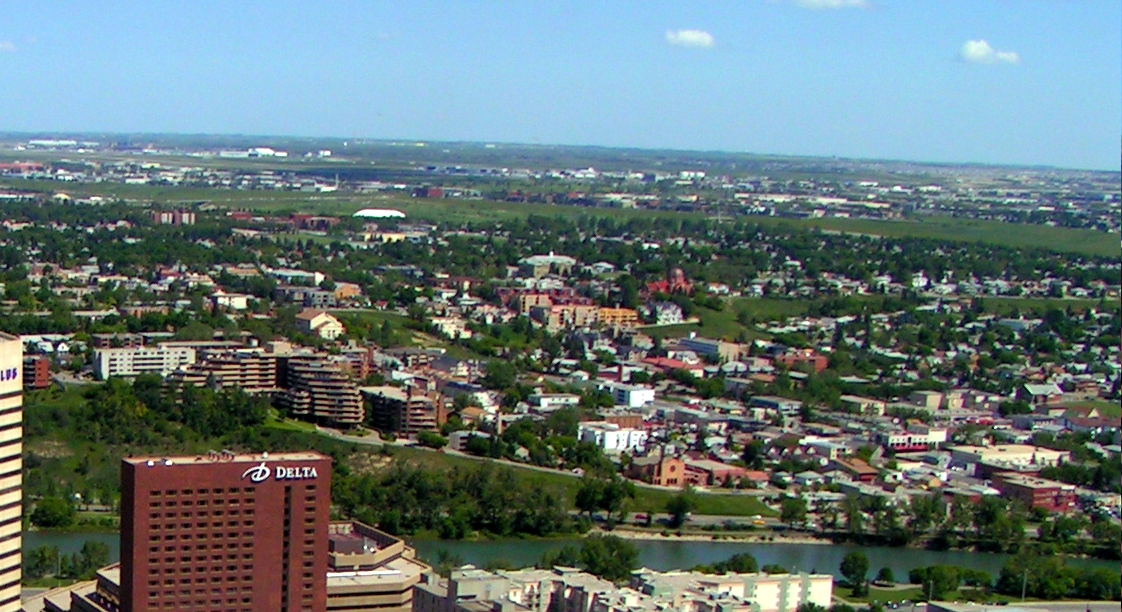
- Bridgeland/Riverside seen from Calgary Tower

- Location of Bridgeland/Riverside in Calgary
- Coordinates: 51°03′17″N 114°02′46″W
- Country: Canada
- Province: Alberta
- City: Calgary
- Quadrant: NE
- Wards: 7, 9
- Established: 1908
- Annexed: 1911

Government
  - Mayor: Jeromy Farkas
  - Administrative body: Calgary City Council
  - Councillors: Myke Atkinson (Independent) Harrison Clark (Independent)

Area
  - Total: 3.2 km^{2} (1.2 sq mi)
- Elevation: 1,055 m (3,461 ft)

Population (2011)
  - Total: 5,254
  - Median Household Income: $64,201
- Postal code: T2E
- Website: brcacalgary.org

Bridgeland/Riverside, also written Bridgeland-Riverside and formerly known as Bridgeland, Riverside, and Germantown, is a neighbourhood in Calgary, Alberta, Canada, is located northeast of Downtown Calgary. It is bounded to the south by the Bow River, to the east by Deerfoot Trail, to the west by Edmonton Trail and to the north by the community of Renfrew.

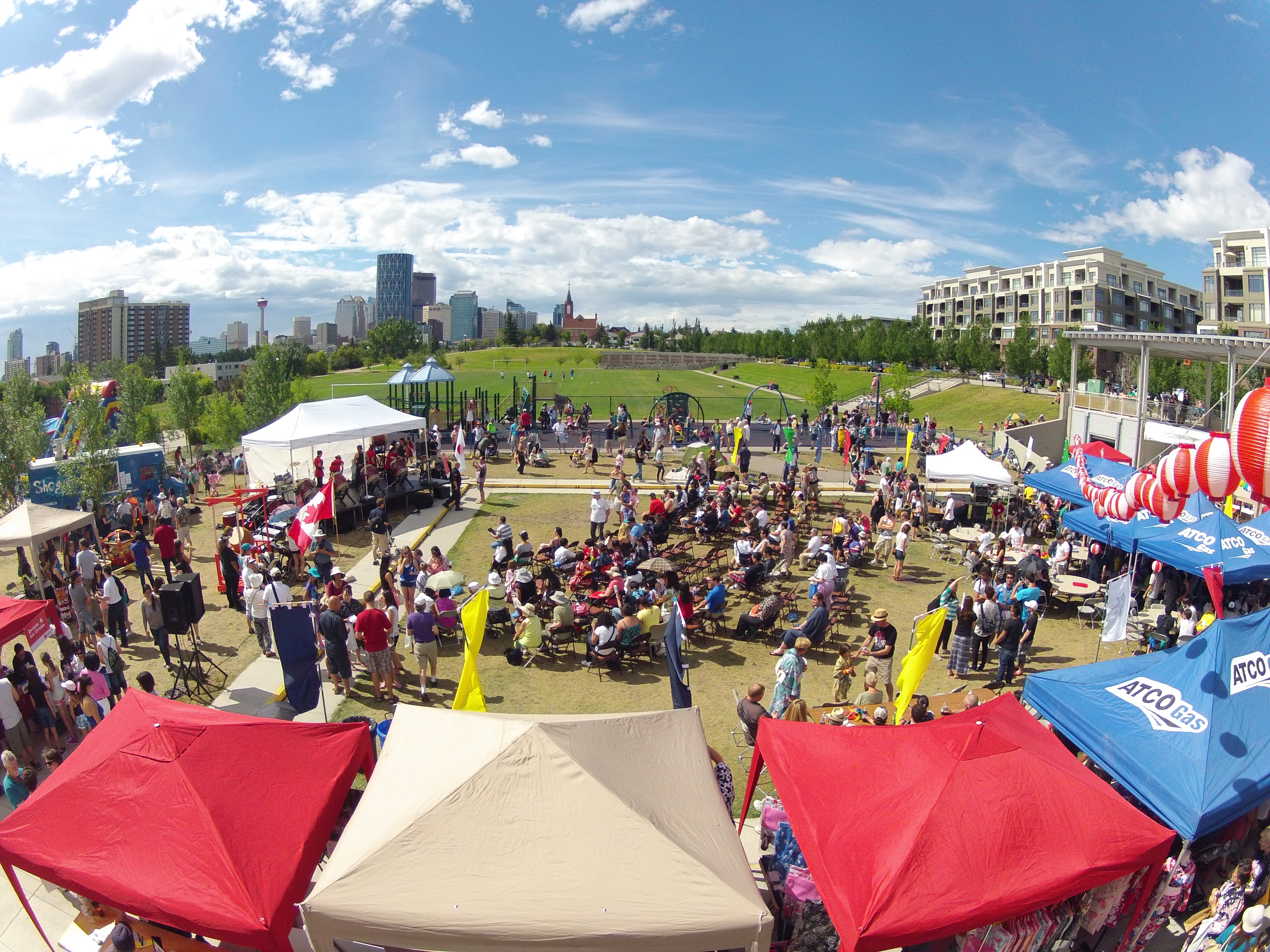
Omatsuri Festival in Bridgeland

The community is primarily residential with a mix of parkside condominiums and single-family houses. Bridgeland/Riverside contains a variety of restaurants, food markets, retail shopping, offices, financial services, churches and schools. The Wilder Institute/Calgary Zoo, Telus Spark, The Bridges urban renewal development and access to the city's large network of pedestrian pathways (the Bow River pathway) and parks are unique focal points for the community and surrounding region.

Bridgeland/Riverside borders a natural environment composed of the confluence of the Bow River and Elbow River. Tom Campbell's Hill park lies on the eastern edge of Bridgeland and overlooks the downtown, Bow River and northeastern part of the city. St. Patrick's Island and St. George's Island lie in the southern part of Bridgeland. St. George's Island is home to the Wilder Institute/Calgary Zoo, Canada's second largest zoo.

Bridgeland/Riverside is the site of the Telus Spark, a $160-million facility that opened on October 29, 2011 and Canada's first purpose-built science centre in more than 25 years.

== History ==
The community of Riverside was established by Russian-German immigrants during Calgary's first population boom in the 1880s, when Riverside was known as Germantown. At the beginning of the 20th century, immigrants were mostly of Italian and Ukrainian origin.

The name "Bridgeland" appeared as a result of the Dominion Bridge Company operating nearby.

Riverside incorporated as a village on July 6, 1903, and was subsequently annexed by the City of Calgary in 1911. In 1910, the Riverside School opened and served the community for 50 years. In 1908, the Bridgeland-Riverside Community Association was founded. A Red Light District survived in the neighbourhood until the First World War. In 1910, the Calgary General Hospital was built in this area. It was closed in 1997 and was demolished in a controlled explosion on October 4, 1998.

Parts of lower Bridgeland were popularly known as "Little Italy" in emulation of similarly named enclaves in other cities of immigrants of Italian stock. The concentration of Italian bakeries, restaurants and groceries has diminished over time but the strip along 1st Avenue NE is sometimes still referred to by this name.

The Wilder Institute/Calgary Zoo was established on St. George's Island in 1929 with 36 mammals and 78 birds. By 2006, it had expanded to over 1,000 animals with 290 different species with exhibits from Destination Africa, Canadian Wilds, Australia, Botanical gardens, Eurasia, Prehistoric Park and South America. This area was severely damaged in the 2013 flood in southern Alberta.

Over 5,000 people participated in a public process that is underway in 2010 to develop a master plan for St. Patrick's Island.

In modern times, the community is recognized as a "distinct bobo (bohemian/bourgeois) residential neighbourhood" and having a high degree of walkability. In 2013, Bridgeland/Riverside was ranked by Fast Forward Weekly magazine as the third "most livable neighbourhood" in Calgary.

== Demographics ==
In the City of Calgary's 2012 municipal census, Bridgeland/Riverside had a population of 5,594 living in 3,274 dwellings, a 6.5% increase from its 2011 population of 5,254. With a land area of 3.1 km^{2} (1.2 sq mi), it had a population density of 1,805/km^{2} (4,670/sq mi) in 2012.

The City of Calgary adopted an area redevelopment plan for this community in 2006, which regulates construction of buildings and recreational areas, with the intention of increasing population density in certain areas, as well as development of a public transit oriented community.

At the beginning of the 21st century, gentrification was occurring in Bridgeland/Riverside. This resulted in new residents and business moving into the community. In addition, household incomes rose by +44.7% within Bridgeland between 2005 and 2015. This compares against a household income growth of +22.7% in the rest of Calgary over the same period.

== Crime ==
Historically Bridgeland was a very challenged area, but has been undergoing redevelopment throughout the 2000s.

Crime Rate
Rate	Crime Rate (/100 pop.)
2018	5.1
2019	5.5
2020	6.0
2021	4.1
2022	5.9
2023	5.4

== Government ==
The community is represented in the Calgary City Council by Ward 9 Councillor Harrison Clark. On a provincial level, Bridgeland/Riverside is part of the Calgary-Mountain View constituency in Alberta's Legislative Assembly and is represented by NDP MLA Kathleen Ganley. On a federal level, Bridgeland/Riverside falls in the electoral district of Calgary Confederation and is represented in the House of Commons of Canada by Liberal MP Corey Hogan.

== Recreation ==
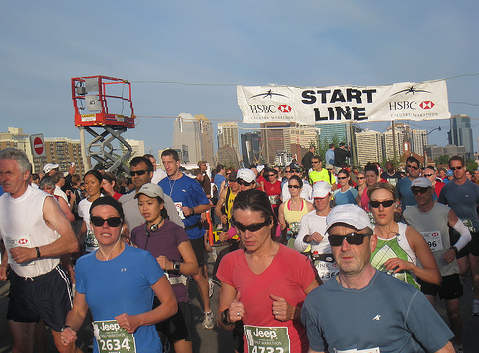
Scotiabank Calgary Marathon 2009

Bridgeland/Riverside is the start and finish point for the Scotiabank Calgary Marathon, Canada's longest running marathon. In 2009, the Scotiabank Calgary Marathon was rated as Alberta's best road race and is a qualifier for the Boston Marathon.

Public recreational facilities within Bridgeland include Harvie Passage whitewater kayak park, soccer pitch, tennis court, community garden, baseball field, off-leash dog park, disc golf course, children's playground and toboggan run. The city recently added a circular basketball court beside the community centre.

In 2010, based on an Ipsos-Reid Needs and Preferences study, the Bridgeland-Riverside Community Association initiated a conceptual design for an ice rink. This rink is flooded most winters and doubles as a market in the summer.

Bridgeland has a summer farmer's market on Thursday afternoon and evenings at the community centre. The community also has shared garden plots that can be rented by residents who live in apartments.

The Calgary Tool Library was established in 2014. The first of its kind in Alberta, members pay a small annual fee and in return have access to some of the most essential household tools without having to buy, store or repair their own.

== Infrastructure ==
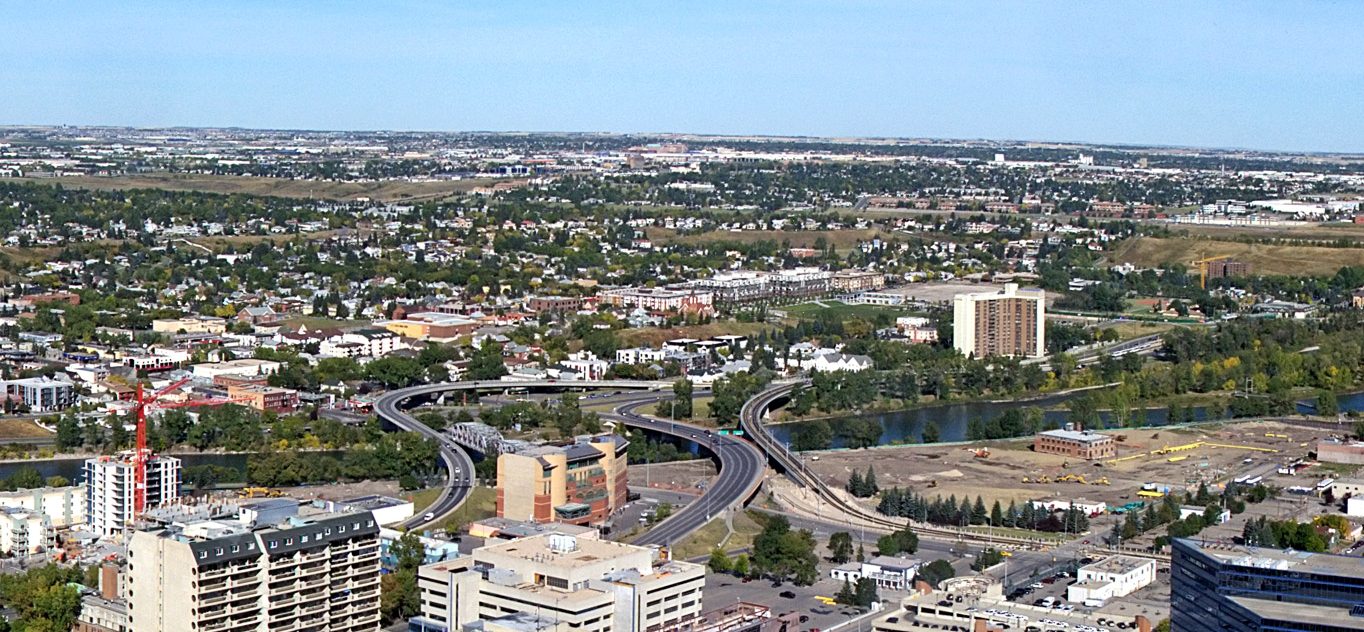
Bridgeland is connected to Downtown Calgary by four bridges

=== C-Train stations ===
The community is served by the Bridgeland/Memorial Station and Zoo Station of the light rail C-Train transit system. As of 2007, there were 1,900 boardings per day at the Bridgeland/Memorial Station, and 1,700 boardings per day at the Zoo Station.

==== The Bridges ====
A major redevelopment dubbed "The Bridges" commenced in 2004 on land previously occupied by the General Hospital and is underway as of 2007. It is a 37-acre (150,000 m^{2}) inner city development, consisting of multi-family residential and mixed use buildings. The project includes 11.7 acres (47,000 m^{2}) of parks and open space.

The Bridges is a transit-orientated development. The three phase project is located next to the Bridgeland-Memorial LRT station which is on the 202 Saddletowne/69 Street line of the city's LRT, the C-Train. Early success of the project has seen it become an example development for cities interested in creating TODs.

Due to its proximity to downtown and access to great restaurants, shops and parkland, Bridgeland has been a focal point for multi-family development. Currently being built in The Bridges community are Bridgeland crossing I & II, Steps Bridgeland and Radius by Bucci is set to go to market in the fall of 2015.

=== George C. King Bridge ===
A design competition was held in 2009, by the Calgary Municipal Land Corporation (CMLC) for a new pedestrian bridge originally called St. Patrick's Island Bridge but now officially known as the George C. King Bridge. The bridge links Bridgeland via the train station, to St. Patrick's Island, and then to East Village across the Bow River. It links sections of the Bow River pathway system including the Zoo paths and Eau Claire. It provides improved linkages to many different nearby communities including Bridgeland, Inglewood, East Village and Downtown Calgary. You can access St. Patricks Island from a ramp in the middle of the bridge. The international design competition received 33 entries, with the winning design selected as RFR of France and Halsall of Calgary. The design is said to "remind the public of a stone skipping across the river or an arch of clouds in the Calgary sky". The goal of the design was to have as little structure as possible in the river channel, to respect the context of the island and to provide a pedestrian and cyclists link. Construction was scheduled for 2010 but began in 2012 and was built at a cost of $25 million.

=== Reconciliation Bridge ===
The Reconciliation Bridge was opened in 1910 and was initially named Langevin Bridge for Sir Hector-Louis Langevin, one of the Fathers of the Canadian Confederation. In 2017, the City council voted to change the bridge's name to Reconciliation Bridge.

In 2009, the City of Calgary set up 5,600 programmable lights on the bridge for Christmas, at a cost of $370,000, as a part of Downtown East Village re-vitalization efforts. The LED, built by Montreal-based Lumenpulse, is composed of 5600 LED grouped in 156 programmable light assemblies, and is part of the RiverWalk project, an effort to improve the pathways along the Bow and Elbow rivers adjacent to the East Village.

== Education ==
The community is served by the following schools:

Elementary

- Delta West Academy (private)
- St. Angela School (Catholic)
- Riverside School (public; specialized science program)

Junior High

- Delta West Academy (private)
- Christine Meikle School (public; special needs)
- Riverside School (public; specialized science program)

High school

- Delta West Academy (private)
- Christine Meikle School (public; special needs)

Bridgeland is also served by the following schools in adjoining neighbourhoods:

- Stanley Jones Elementary School (public; Renfrew neighbourhood)
- Colonel McLeod Junior High School (public; Renfrew neighbourhood)
- Crescent Heights High School (public; Crescent Heights neighbourhood)
- St. Alphonsus Junior High School (Catholic; Renfrew neighbourhood)
- St. Mary's High School (Catholic; Mission neighbourhood)

== See also ==
- List of former urban municipalities in Alberta
- List of neighbourhoods in Calgary
