= St. Patrick's Island Park =

Park in Alberta, Canada

Coordinates: 51.047°N 114.041°W

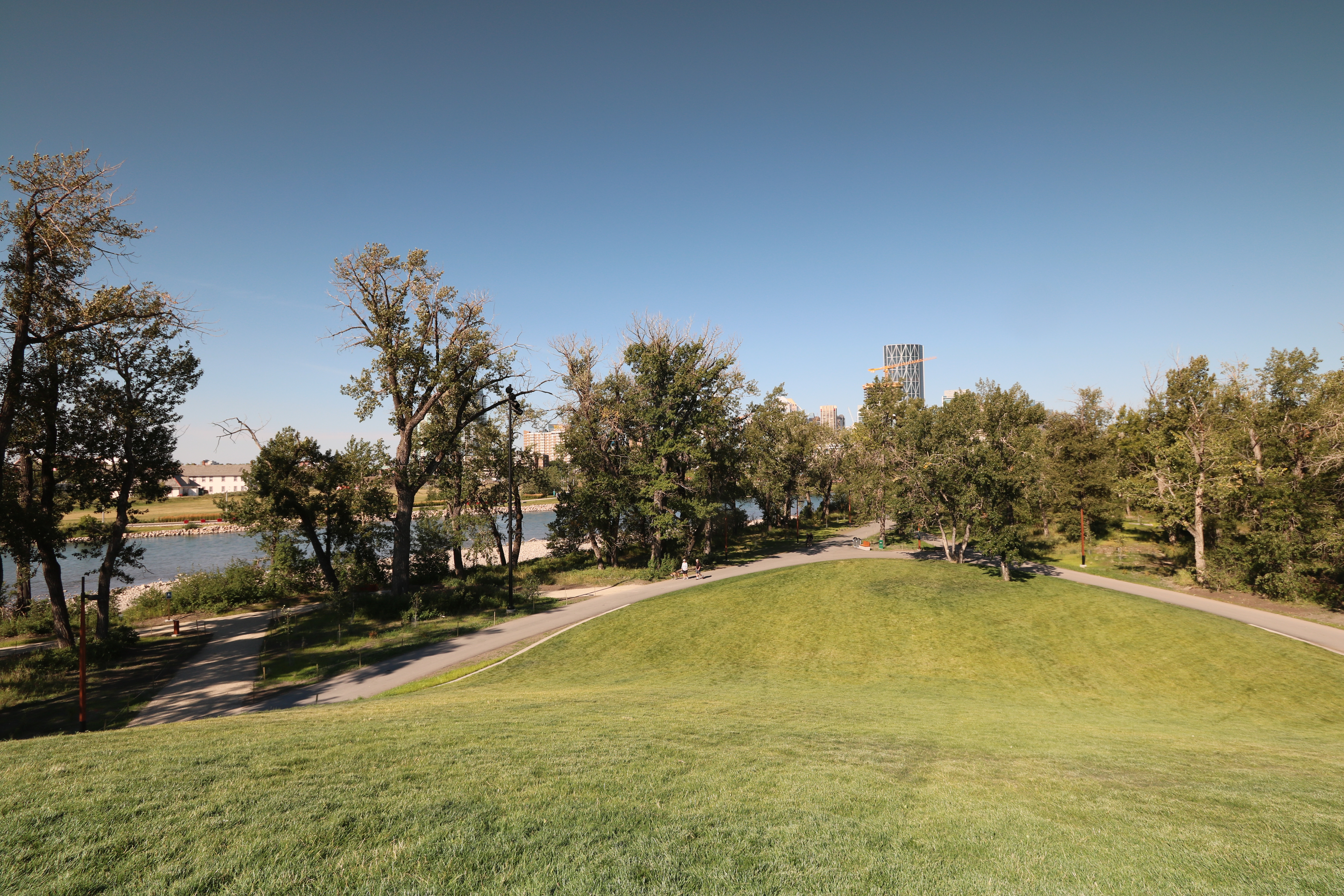
Part of the city skyline can be seen above St. Patrick's Island Park

St. Patrick's Island Park (also simply known as St. Patrick's Island) is a 31-acre public park on an island at the confluence of the Bow and Elbow rivers just northeast of Downtown Calgary. St. Patrick's Island is one of Calgary's oldest parks. Its development as a public space began in the 1890s, gaining momentum as an important public space in the Calgary inner city with the construction of a bridge to the island in the early 1900s. Throughout the decades, the island has been transformed, playing host to a campground in the 1960s, to being the host of squatters for much of the period from the 1980s to the 2000s. For several decades, the island was connected to Calgary's undesirable East Village neighbourhood by a steel and wooden bridge. However, in the late 2000s the Calgary Municipal Land Corporation began a redevelopment of the East Village, with a particular focus on redeveloping St. Patrick's Island into a full-fledged city park with programmed activities and physical access to the Bow River. After years of construction, the newly redeveloped St. Patrick's Island Park opened to the public in July 2015, along with the new George C. King Bridge which connects the island park with both the East Village to the south and Bridgeland to the north.

== Areas of the park ==
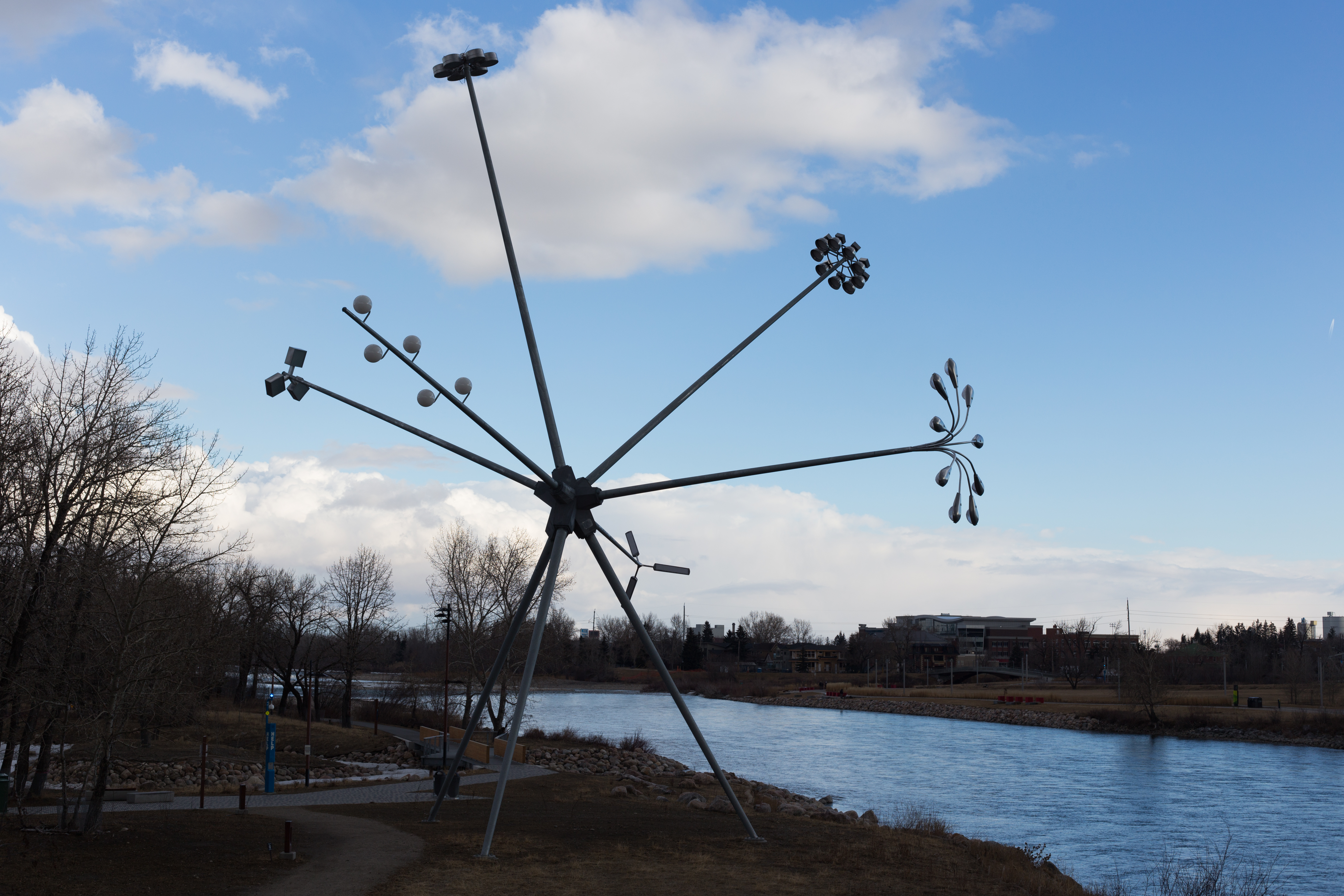
A sculpture known as Bloom is featured in the park. it was designed by Michel de Broin

=== The Tip ===
A seating area at the western tip of the island with a view of downtown.

=== The Seasonal Breach ===
This area has been transformed from a flat grass prairie back into a channel that historically cut across the island. The breach provides a space for people to wade into the river, and has a pebble beach on the shore with room for people to sit down.

=== The Rise ===
A grassy knoll in the middle of the island that acts as an amphitheatre for movies-in-the-park in summer, and tobogganing in the winter.

=== The Playmound ===
An area of the park with playground equipment.

=== The Lowland Channel ===
A seasonal riparian wetland in the centre of the island. In periods of high water on the Bow River, the wetland will flood. There is a boardwalk over the wetland.

=== The Picnic Grove ===
A family-oriented area of the island with wood-burning grills available for cooking.

=== The Cove ===
The cove provides access to the river for rafters and people who like to fish.

=== Confluence Plaza ===
A gathering space at the eastern end of the island. Tables, chairs, an amphitheater, and a sun deck are located here.

== See also ==
- Calgary's East Village
- George C. King Bridge
- Jack and Jean Leslie RiverWalk
- Area redevelopment plan
