= King Edward Hotel (disambiguation) =

King Edward Hotel may refer to several hotels:

- King Edward Hotel (Jackson, Mississippi) - USA
- King Edward Hotel - Toronto, Ontario, Canada
- King Edward Hotel (Calgary) - Calgary, Alberta, Canada
