= Calgary Municipal Land Corporation =

Calgary Municipal Land Corporation (CMLC) was incorporated in 2007 as a wholly owned subsidiary of the City of Calgary to implement and execute the Rivers District Community Revitalization Plan – a public infrastructure program approved by the City of Calgary and the Province of Alberta to kick-start Calgary's urban renewal. Since its inception, the CMLC has overseen the development of the East Village, which as of January 2017 has seen CAD $2.7 billion worth of investment since 2010. As part of its revitalization efforts, CMLC has played a leading role in adaptive reuse and heritage conservation projects throughout the city. Notable examples include the transformation of the historic Simmons Mattress Factory building in the East Village into a mixed-use hub for dining and community gathering, and the integration of the King Edward Hotel into the National Music Centre. These projects exemplify CMLC’s commitment to balancing urban growth with the preservation of Calgary’s architectural heritage.

The CMLC has also been tasked with the redevelopment of Calgary's West Village, Stampede Park, Victoria Park, Olympic Plaza, Arts Commons, and Fort Calgary.

== See also ==
- Calgary's East Village
- George C. King Bridge
- Jack and Jean Leslie RiverWalk
- Heritage conservation in Canada
- National Music Centre (Studio Bell)
