= Jeremy Nixon =

Canadian politician

The Honourable Jeremy Nixon ECA
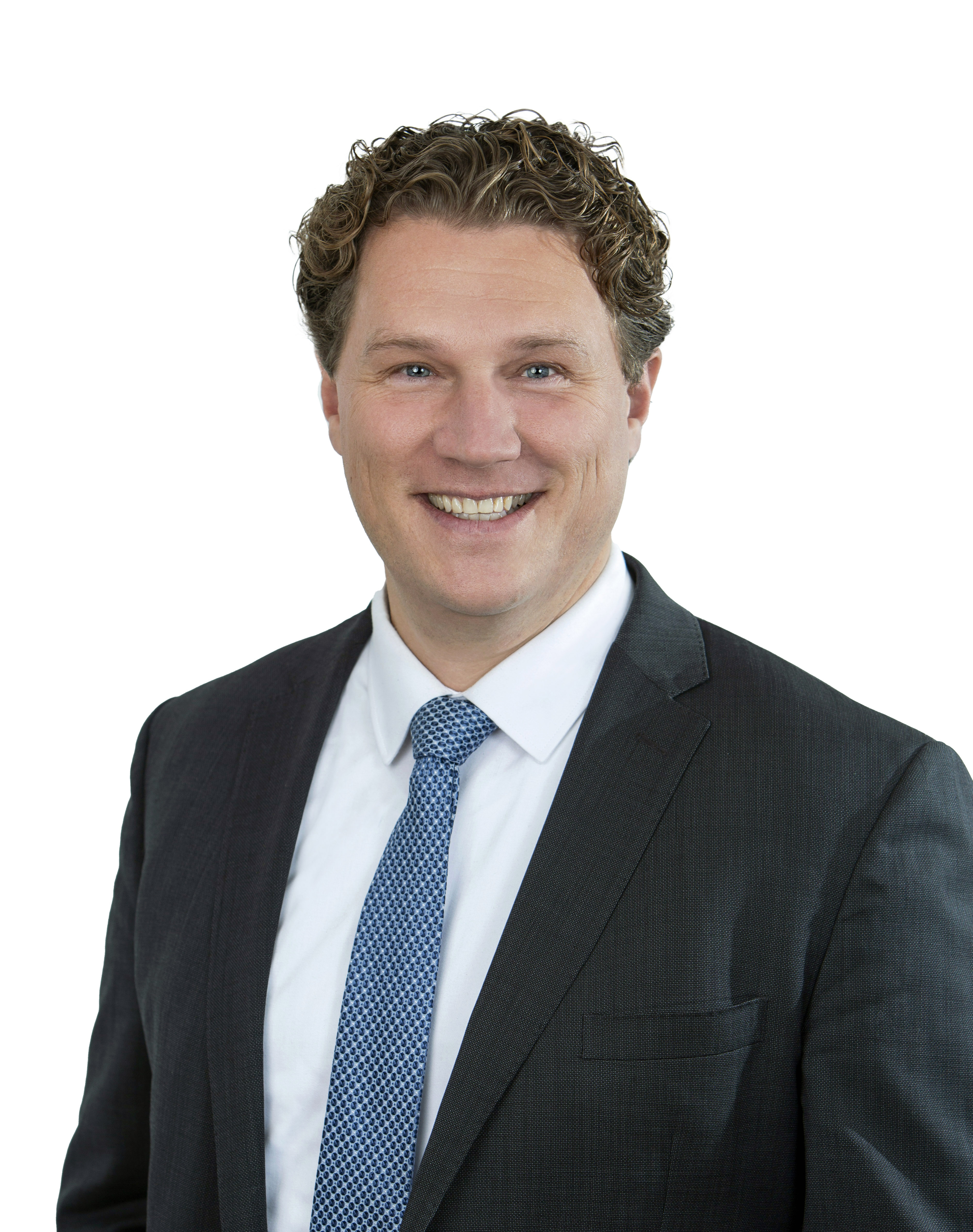
- Jeremy Nixon, 2023

Minister of Seniors, Community and Social Services
- In office 2022 – May 2023
- Premier: Danielle Smith
- Preceded by: Position established

Member of the Legislative Assembly of Alberta for Calgary-Klein
- In office April 16, 2019 – May 2023
- Preceded by: Craig Coolahan
- Succeeded by: Lizette Tejada

Personal details
- Born: 1981 or 1982 (age 43–44) Calgary, Alberta, Canada
- Party: Conservative Party of Canada; United Conservative Party
- Other political affiliations: Wildrose Party (2012–15)
- Website: https://votenixon.ca/

Jeremy Nixon (born 1982) is a Canadian politician who was elected in the 2019 Alberta general election to represent the electoral district of Calgary-Klein in the 30th Alberta Legislature. He is the brother of Jason Nixon, and the son of Patrick R. Nixon, the founder of the Mustard Seed street ministry. Jason and Jeremy Nixon are the first two brothers to sit in the Alberta Legislature simultaneously.

== Political career ==
After obtaining a Bachelor of Communications and Culture from the University of Calgary, Nixon spent 15 years working in the not-for-profit and government sector. He held leadership roles with the Boys & Girls Clubs of Calgary, the Mustard Seed, Canadian Mental Health Association and the City of Calgary.

During office, he sat on various Standing Committees including the Select Special Democratic Accountability Committee, the Standing Committee on Families and Communities, the Standing Committee on Legislative Offices and the Standing Committee on Private Bills and Private Members' Public Bills.

On November 23, 2021, Nixon was appointed parliamentary secretary to the Minister of Community and Social Services for Civil Society.

In December 2020, Nixon traveled to Hawaii during the height of a COVID-19 wave in Alberta. Faced with public scrutiny over his vacation, Nixon resigned from his position as parliamentary secretary.

Danielle Smith, the Premier of Alberta, said on October 21, 2022 that Nixon would be promoted to cabinet as Minister of Seniors, Community and Social Services.

As Minister, Nixon was responsible for several files, including re-indexing Assured Income for the Severely Handicapped (AISH) and the Alberta Seniors Benefit to inflation. Nixon led the Calgary Public Safety and Community Response Task Force aimed at finding solutions to the ongoing addictions and homelessness crises in the city. Nixon was able to secure $20 million in funding for food banks in Alberta.

He lost his seat in the 2023 Alberta general election to Lizette Tejada of the Alberta New Democratic Party.

Following Ron Liepert's announcement that he would not be running in the 2025 Canadian federal election, Nixon announced that he was seeking the Conservative Party of Canada's nomination for Calgary Signal Hill. He lost the nomination to David McKenzie.

On March 23, 2025, Nixon announced that he had been selected as the Conservative Party candidate for Calgary-Confederation, after incumbent Len Webber announced his resignation.

== Personal life ==
Nixon was born in Calgary, Alberta. His father, Pat Nixon, is the founder of the Mustard Seed, a non-profit organization with a mission to eliminate homelessness and reduce poverty; Jeremy worked for the Mustard Seed for a decade. He is the brother of Alberta MLA Jason Nixon. He and his wife, Anita, have four children.

== Electoral history ==
=== 2025 federal election ===
2025 Canadian federal election: Calgary Confederation
Party	Candidate	Votes	%	±%	Expenditures
Liberal	Corey Hogan	33,112	48.10	+20.21	$131,979.58
Conservative	Jeremy Nixon	31,839	46.25	+0.56	$123,194.59
New Democratic	Keira Gunn	2,844	4.13	–13.59	$35,445.87
Green	Richard Willott	400	0.58	–3.10	none listed
People's	Artyom Ovsepyan	302	0.44	–4.20	$1,192.14
Canadian Future	Jeffrey Reid Marsh	198	0.29	–	$3,284.85
Marxist–Leninist	Kevan Hunter	144	0.21	–0.08	none listed
Total valid votes/expense limit		68,839	99.30	–	$137,334.45
Total rejected ballots		483	0.70	+0.10	
Turnout		69,322	74.48	+7.08	
Eligible voters		93,071			
Liberal gain from Conservative		Swing		+9.92	
Source: Elections Canada

=== 2023 general election ===
2023 Alberta general election: Calgary-Klein
Party	Candidate	Votes	%	±%
New Democratic	Lizette Tejada	10,564	50.87	+10.97
United Conservative	Jeremy Nixon	9,697	46.69	-0.92
Green	Kenneth Drysdale	353	1.70	+0.36
Solidarity Movement	Rob Oswin	153	0.74	–
Total		20,767	99.17	–
Rejected and declined		173	0.83	
Turnout		20,940	59.23	
Eligible voters		35,352		
New Democratic gain from United Conservative		Swing		+5.95
Source(s) Source: Elections Alberta

=== 2019 general election ===
2019 Alberta general election: Calgary-Klein
Party	Candidate	Votes	%	±%	Expenditures
United Conservative	Jeremy Nixon	10,473	47.62	-3.65	$71,085
New Democratic	Craig Coolahan	8,776	39.90	-2.63	$42,716
Alberta Party	Kara Levis	1,842	8.37	–	$18,147
Liberal	Michael Macdonald	396	1.80	-4.06	$1,598
Green	Janine St. Jean	294	1.34	+1.23	$750
Alberta Independence	C.W. Alexander	214	0.97	–	$3,445
Total		21,995	99.05	–	
Rejected, spoiled and declined		210	0.95		
Turnout		22,205	64.56		
Eligible voters		34,392			
United Conservative notional hold		Swing		-0.51	
Source(s) Source: Elections Alberta Note: Expenses is the sum of "Election Expenses", "Other Expenses" and "Transfers Issued". The Elections Act limits "Election Expenses" to $50,000.

=== 2015 general election ===
2015 Alberta general election: Calgary-Klein
Party	Candidate	Votes	%	±%
New Democratic	Craig Coolahan	8,098	44.29%	34.14%
Progressive Conservative	Kyle Fawcett	4,878	26.68%	-14.54%
Wildrose	Jeremy Nixon	4,206	23.00%	-11.58%
Liberal	David Gamble	1,104	6.04%	-5.89%
Total		18,286	–	–
Rejected, spoiled and declined		168	41	51
Eligible electors / turnout		34,702	53.33%	-2.15%
New Democratic gain from Progressive Conservative		Swing		5.48%
Source(s) Source: "17 - Calgary-Klein, 2015 Alberta general election". officialresults.elections.ab.ca. Elections Alberta. Chief Electoral Officer (2016). 2015 General Election. A Report of the Chief Electoral Officer (PDF) (Report). Edmonton, Alta.: Elections Alberta. pp. 151–153.

=== 2012 general election ===
2012 Alberta general election: Calgary-Klein
Affiliation	Candidate	Votes	%
Progressive Conservative	Kyle Fawcett	6852	41.21%
Wildrose	Jeremy Nixon	5755	34.61%
Liberal	Christopher Tahn	1980	11.91%
New Democratic	Marc Power	1687	10.15%
Evergreen	Roger Gagné	354	2.13%
Total		16628	
Rejected, spoiled and declined			
Eligible electors / Turnout			%
Source: Elections Alberta
