= Renfrew, Calgary =

Renfrew
- Neighbourhood
- Location of Renfrew in Calgary
- Coordinates: 51°03′44″N 114°02′25″W
- Country: Canada
- Province: Alberta
- City: Calgary
- Quadrant: NE
- Ward: 9
- Established: 1950

Government
  - Mayor: Jeromy Farkas
  - Administrative body: Calgary City Council
  - Councillor: Harrison Clark (Independent)

Area
  - Total: 1.5 km^{2} (0.58 sq mi)
- Elevation: 1,070 m (3,510 ft)

Population (2006)
  - Total: 5,629
  - Average Income: $47,692
- Website: Renfrew Community Association

Renfrew is a residential neighbourhood in the northeast quadrant of Calgary, Alberta. It is located south of the Trans-Canada Highway, and north of the inner city community of Bridgeland. To the east it is bordered by the Nose Hill Creek and the Deerfoot Trail and is separated from Crescent Heights to the west by Edmonton Trail.

It is represented in the Calgary City Council by the Ward 9 councillor.

The area consists mainly of residences with no major commercial or industrial facilities. There are some small businesses located along Edmonton Trail and 16th Avenue. There are no emergency health care facilities in the district, though several physicians' offices have been established, and the Alberta Alcoholism and Drug Abuse Commission does have a treatment facility established in the neighbourhood.

In 2014 Renfrew was listed as #22 on Avenue Magazine's "50 Best Neighbourhoods" list, a ranking of desirability of Calgary's neighbourhoods.

== History ==
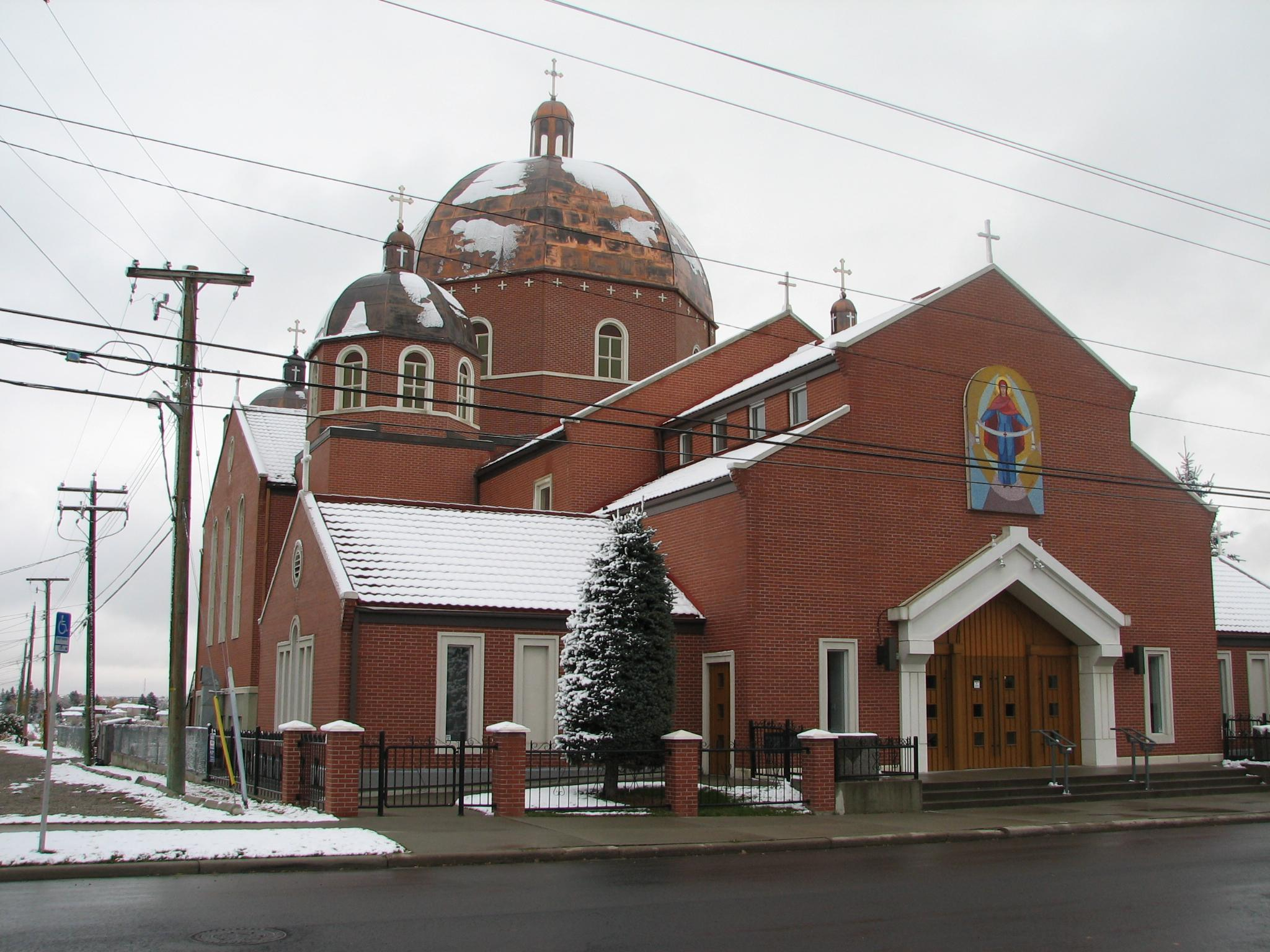
Assumption of the Blessed Virgin Mary Ukrainian Catholic Church

Ukrainian Pioneer Park is located on the 600 block of 7th Avenue, and there are two Ukrainian churches (one Catholic and one Orthodox) in close proximity, a testament to early settlers of Slavic origin who settled in the area. Other visible signs of this heritage include a monument to victims of genocide in Ukraine, erected by the banks of the Bow River in the adjacent community of Bridgeland.

The community itself was not developed until the 1940s. During the Second World War, the area was occupied by a Royal Canadian Air Force training base and airfield which also served as the Calgary airport. Once the airport was relocated from its original site (on the corner of present-day 6th Street and Regal Crescent), the area was developed for residential use.

== Demographics ==
In the City of Calgary's 2012 municipal census, Renfrew had a population of 5,846 living in 3,231 dwellings, a 3.1% increase from its 2011 population of 5,669. With a land area of 2.7 km^{2} (1.0 sq mi), it had a population density of 2,170/km^{2} (5,610/sq mi) in 2012.

Residents in this community had a median household income of $47,692 in 2000, and there were 15.6% low income residents living in the neighbourhood. As of 2000, 18.4% of the residents were immigrants. A proportion of 38.5% of the buildings were condominiums or apartments, and 40.9% of the housing was used for renting.

== Crime ==
Crime Data
Year	Crime Rate (/100)
2018	4.8
2019	4.7
2020	4.4
2021	2.6
2022	3.9
2023	3.5

== Education ==
Several major schools are located in the district, including Colonel Macleod Junior High, St. Alphonsus Elementary/Junior High, Stanley Jones Elementary, and the former Renfrew Elementary.

== Amenities ==
A full-sized football field is located at Renfrew Athletic Park. Parkland and greenspace are not abundant with the exception of the school grounds, and the area adjacent to Nose Hill creek, which includes the McInnis & Holloway Memorial Forest still in its infancy. Other athletic facilities in addition to the schools include the Boys & Girls Club, a swimming pool, indoor skating rink, an outdoor skating rink at the community association building, and soccer fields located by the creek.

Renfrew has also become home to several notable dining establishments including Boogies Burgers (est. 1969), and the 2012 Where to Dine winner for Best Brunch, OEB Breakfast CO.

Several convenience stores are clustered in the western portion of the neighbourhood, including the Stanley Jones grocery, occupying one of the oldest surviving structures in the neighbourhood.

The neighbourhood is in direct proximity to several commercial zones, including shops along Edmonton Trail and Centre Street in adjacent Crescent Heights and Bridgeland, along 16th Avenue to the north and west, and across the bridge in Mayland Heights. The downtown core is only 3,000 metres from Renfrew and easily accessible by city transit, bike, private automobile, or foot.

== See also ==
- List of neighbourhoods in Calgary
