= Downtown East Village, Calgary =

Downtown East Village
- Neighbourhood
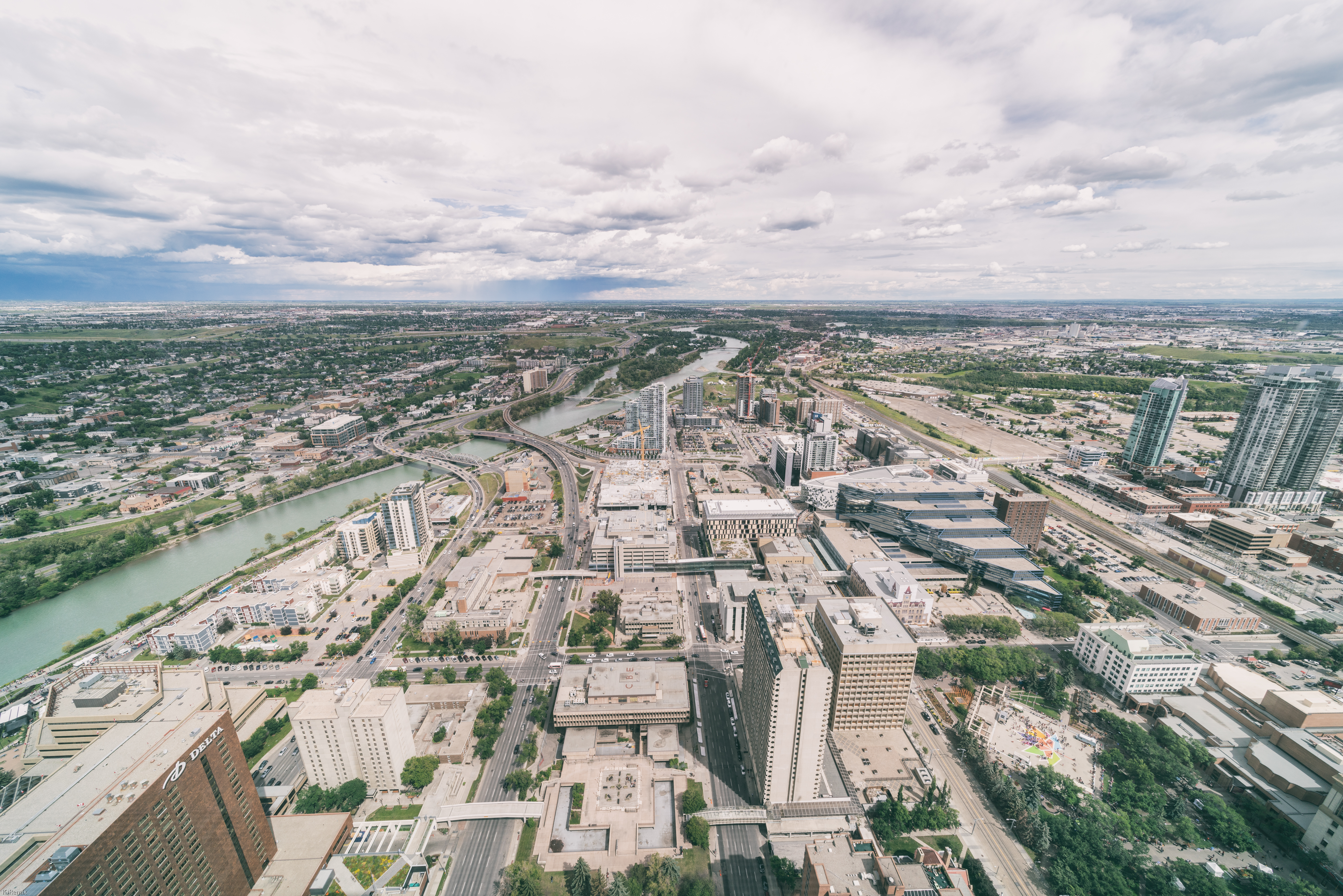
- Overview of Downtown East Village (2018)

- Location of Downtown East Village in Calgary
- Coordinates: 51°02′46″N 114°03′11″W
- Country: Canada
- Province: Alberta
- City: Calgary
- Quadrant: SE
- Ward: 7
- Established: 1900

Government
  - Administrative body: Calgary City Council
  - Councillor: Druh Farrell

Area
  - Total: 0.5 km^{2} (0.19 sq mi)
- Elevation: 1,043 m (3,422 ft)

Population (2016)
  - Total: 3,242
  - Density: 6,484/km^{2} (16,790/sq mi)
  - Median Income (2005): $17,253
- Time zone: UTC-7 (Mountain Time)
  - Summer (DST): UTC-6 (Mountain Daylight Time)
- Area code: 403
- Website: East Village Experience Downtown East Village Info Site

Downtown East Village more commonly known as simply East Village, is a mixed-use neighbourhood within the eastern portions of downtown Calgary, Alberta, Canada. It is contained within the city's Rivers District. Containing the earliest-settled land in the Calgary area - Fort Calgary - East Village was for years a mixture of high-rise residential, commercial, and industrial development. Much of the parkland currently surrounding Fort Calgary was industrial as recently as the 1960s. Construction of the city's light rail transit Blue Line, coupled with the closure of 8th Avenue at Macleod Trail in the early 1980s by construction of the massive Calgary Municipal Building, resulted in East Village being "cut off," from the rest of downtown. It became home to many rundown properties and vacant lots over the years, and a severe crime problem.

Plans to reshape this neighbourhood were approved by Calgary City Council in March 2005 (East Village Area Redevelopment Plan). In Spring 2007, Calgary City Council approved the formation of a wholly owned subsidiary known as Calgary Municipal Land Corporation (CMLC) with the mandate to revitalize and redevelop the Rivers District, which includes the East Village. Construction began in earnest within the Rivers District by the new corporation in 2007 with the undertaking of a rare downtown Calgary stormwater treatment pond in the NW corner of Fort Calgary. Many of the dilapidated buildings were torn down, to be replaced by modern structures, and the Jack and Jean Leslie RiverWalk along the south bank of the Bow River was completed in the summer of 2012. As of January 2017, several luxury condominium towers have been completed, along with two new hotels, while construction is underway on several more condominium towers, retail buildings, with additional commercial and residential development planned. As of 2017, the neighbourhood has attracted $2.7 billion worth of investment.

== Demographics ==
In the City of Calgary's 2016 municipal census, Downtown East Village had a population of 3,242 living in 1,897 dwellings, a 14.2% increase from its 2015 population of 2,838. With a land area of 0.5 km^{2} (0.19 sq mi), it had a population density of 6,500/km^{2} (16,800/sq mi) in 2016.

Residents in this community had a median household income of $17,253 in 2005. As a reference, in 2005 the median household income for the whole city of Calgary was $67,238.

In 2005 there were 53.1% low income residents living in the neighbourhood. As of 2006, 31.9% of the residents were immigrants. A proportion of 94.7% of the buildings were condominiums or apartments, and 83.8% of the housing was used for renting, this being the highest renting/owning rate in the city.

== Crime ==
In the May 2023-May 2024 data period, Downtown East Village had a crime rate of 15.605/100, an increase from the previous data period.

This puts it at this comparison to other Calgary communities: Saddle Ridge (1.358/100), Whitehorn (1.741/100), Rundle (2.342/100), Brentwood (2.348/100), Acadia (2.542/100), Bowness (2.934/100), Shawnessy (3.296/100), Inglewood (3.438/100), Sunnyside (3.650/100), Marlborough (4.703/100), Southwood (5.147/100), Sunalta (5.307/100), Montgomery (5.483/100), Forest Lawn (6.528/100), Rosscarrock (7.049/100), Downtown Commercial Core (12.705/100), Downtown East Village (15.605/100), Manchester (43.368/100).

=== Crime data by year ===
Crime Data
Year	Crime Rate (/100 pop.)
2018	4.2
2019	10.2
2020	9.6
2021	10.0
2022	10.7
2023	15.1

== Archeological discovery ==
In the spring and summer of 2008, archeologists made several rare discoveries in East Village: two historic dumps from the early 20th century, as well as a native stone circle and fire hearths dating back over 3,300 years. Calgary archeologist Brian Vivian says it's the first pre-contact site of its type that archeologists have discovered in inner-city Calgary.

== Area redevelopment ==
=== Infrastructure ===
In 2007, Calgary Municipal Land Corporation (CMLC) invested $357 million in infrastructure upgrades to the neighbourhood. These upgrades included elevating the roads above the flood-plain of the nearby Bow and Elbow rivers, paving the new roads and sidewalks with stone bricks, building the award-winning Jack and Jean Leslie RiverWalk, major utility upgrades, the construction of plazas, and much more. These infrastructure upgrades were completed in 2015, with the completion of Celebration Square located along Riverfront Lane, between 6th and 7th Avenues SE.

=== Residential buildings ===
Since 2012, the East Village has seen the construction of several residential buildings, which have increased the population of the neighbourhood substantially. The first building to be completed under the guise of CMLC was Fuse in 2015. Fuse is the shorter of two towers that make up the Evolution development. As of January 2017, there are six residential buildings under construction in the East Village.

N3 is the city's first parking-free condominium.

=== Institutional buildings ===
East Village is home of the National Music Centre, the first national cultural institution dedicated to celebrating music in Canada in all of its forms. The $191 million building houses the Canadian Music Hall of Fame, the Canadian Country Music Hall of Fame, broadcast facilities, a museum of impressive musical artefacts such as the Rolling Stones Mobile Recording Studio, and a 300-seat performance hall. The new National Music Centre building has incorporated the 120-year-old King Edward Hotel building into its structure. The King Edward Hotel was, for a long time, a famous jazz and blues venue, thus continuing the tradition of this site as a centre for musical development in Canada.

The village is also home to the New Central Library of the Calgary Public Library, which opened on November 1, 2018. The library houses children's books, performance venues and activity rooms on its lower floors, together with an extensive fiction section and reading room on its upper floor. CMLC held a design competition for the new library. American-Norwegian architecture firm Snøhetta and Canadian firm DIALOG won the competition to design the 240,000 square feet (22,000 m^{2}) building. The $245 million structure will house 600,000 titles, a reading room, a cafe, a 340-seat theatre, and conference rooms, as well as many activity centres and reading areas.

=== Retail buildings ===
Much of the East Village redevelopment consists of mixed-use buildings, housing both residential and retail uses. This will be most apparent on 'The Riff'. The Riff will be a pedestrian street bisecting the neighbourhood from the northeast to the southwest, from the George C. King Bridge to 8th Avenue SE. The Riff will be a major retail street, housing an as yet unknown collection of retailers.

In late 2016, RioCan Developments started construction on a major new retail destination known as 5th and Third. This development is an entire city block and will include two full floors of underground parking, 2 full floors of retail, along with two large residential condo towers on top. Confirmed tenants as of January 2017 are a full-sized Loblaws City Market and Shoppers Drug Mart.

So far, two of the neighbourhood's major historic structures have been redeveloped for retail uses. The Simmons Mattress Factory building has been redeveloped into the home of Charbar, Phil & Sebastians Coffee Roasters, and Sidewalk Citizen Bakery. While the newly completed revitalization of the St. Louis Hotel building has yet to receive any retail tenants as of January 2017, its upper floors are home to the offices of the Calgary Municipal Land Corporation.

As of January 2017, construction is imminent on a new 4-storey retail building located directly between the RiverWalk and Confluence Way. This building is intended to host restaurants and will be in a key location, right along the riverbank.

=== Historic buildings ===
East Village plays host to several of Calgary's oldest buildings. The Simmons Mattress Factory building, constructed in 1912, is a leading example of adaptive reuse in Calgary. It has been carefully restored and repurposed from its original industrial use as a mattress factory to house Charbar, Phil & Sebastian Coffee Roasters, and Sidewalk Citizen Bakery, right along the RiverWalk. The city's oldest running hotel, the King Edward Hotel, built in 1905, has been deconstructed and rebuilt as part of the National Music Centre. The St. Louis Hotel has been revitalized and now hosts the headquarters of Calgary Municipal Land Corporation and a rental venue. The Hillier Block has been restored and is now home to the Calgary Public Library Foundation, ADD-IN, and the New Central Library Discovery Centre for the duration of the NCL construction project happening next door.

=== Parks and plazas ===
Calgary Municipal Land Corporation has built three plazas in the neighbourhood, these are RiverWalk Plaza next to the Simmons Building, Fifth Street Square at the intersection of 5th Street SE and 7 Avenue SE, and Celebration Square along the C-train's Blue Line between 5th and 6th Avenues SE.

CMLC was also responsible for the revitalization of St. Patrick's Island Park. The park revitalization was coupled with the construction of the George C. King Bridge for a total price tag of $45 million. The George C. King Bridge connects the island park south to the East Village and Bridgeland to the north.

== See also ==
- List of neighbourhoods in Calgary
