= Lizette Tejada =

Canadian politician

Lizette Tejada MLA

Member of the Legislative Assembly of Alberta for Calgary-Klein
- Incumbent
- Assumed office May 29, 2023
- Preceded by: Jeremy Nixon

Personal details
- Party: NDP
- Education: Toronto Metropolitan University; University of Calgary

Lizette Tejada is a Canadian politician from the Alberta New Democratic Party. She has been the Member of the Legislative Assembly of Alberta for Calgary-Klein since the 2023 Alberta general election. As of June 24, 2024, she serves as the Official Opposition critic for Immigration and Multiculturalism.

== Early life ==
Tejada was born in Edmonton, Alberta to parents who came to Canada from El Salvador in the 1970s.

== Career ==
Prior to being elected, Tejada worked as a political staffer for Calgary-Mountain View MLA Kathleen Ganley.

Tejada won the hotly-contested race to receive the ANDP's nomination in Calgary-Klein; which featured four other potential candidates.

In the 2023 Alberta general election, Tejada defeated incumbent MLA Jeremy Nixon, a cabinet member in Danielle Smith's UCP government.

== Electoral history ==
2023 Alberta general election: Calgary-Klein
Party	Candidate	Votes	%	±%
New Democratic	Lizette Tejada	10,564	50.87	+10.97
United Conservative	Jeremy Nixon	9,697	46.69	-0.92
Green	Kenneth Drysdale	353	1.70	+0.36
Solidarity Movement	Rob Oswin	153	0.74	–
Total		20,767	99.17	–
Rejected and declined		173	0.83	
Turnout		20,940	59.23	
Eligible voters		35,352		
New Democratic gain from United Conservative		Swing		+5.95
Source(s) Source: Elections Alberta
