= Calgary-Klein =

Provincial electoral district in Alberta, Canada

Coordinates: 51.09°N 114.06°W

Alberta electoral district
- Calgary-Klein within the City of Calgary, 2017 boundaries

Provincial electoral district
- Legislature: Legislative Assembly of Alberta
MLA
Lizette Tejada
New Democratic
- District created: 2010
- First contested: 2012
- Last contested: 2023

Calgary-Klein is a provincial electoral district in Calgary, Alberta, Canada. The district was created in the 2010 boundary redistribution and is mandated to return a single member to the Legislative Assembly of Alberta using the first past the post voting system. The riding is named after former premier Ralph Klein.

== History ==
The electoral district was created in the 2010 Alberta boundary re-distribution. It was created mainly from Calgary-North Hill and a portion of Calgary-Nose Hill.

=== Boundary history ===
17 Calgary-Klein 2010 boundaries
Bordering districts
North	west	West	east
Calgary-Mackay-Nose Hill	Calgary-Cross	Calgary-Varsity	Calgary-East and Calgary-Mountain View
Legal description from the Statutes of Alberta 2010, Electoral Divisions Act.

=== Electoral history ===
Members of the Legislative Assembly for Calgary-Klein
Assembly	Years	Member	Party
See Calgary-North Hill 1971-2012, Calgary-Nose Hill 2004-2012
28th	2012–2015	Kyle Fawcett	Progressive Conservative
29th	2015–2019	Craig Coolahan	New Democratic
30th	2019–2023	Jeremy Nixon	United Conservative
31st	2023–present	Lizette Tejada	New Democratic

Prior to the election of New Democrat candidate Craig Coolahan in 2015, the antecedent electoral districts that comprise Calgary-Klein elected Progressive Conservative candidates since the 1970s. The seat returned to the NDP in the 2023 Alberta general election.

== Legislative election results ==
=== 2023 ===
2023 Alberta general election
Party	Candidate	Votes	%	±%
New Democratic	Lizette Tejada	10,564	50.87	+10.97
United Conservative	Jeremy Nixon	9,697	46.69	-0.92
Green	Kenneth Drysdale	353	1.70	+0.36
Solidarity Movement	Rob Oswin	153	0.74	–
Total		20,767	99.17	–
Rejected and declined		173	0.83	
Turnout		20,940	59.23	
Eligible voters		35,352		
New Democratic gain from United Conservative		Swing		+5.95
Source(s) Source: Elections Alberta

=== 2019 ===
2019 Alberta general election
Party	Candidate	Votes	%	±%	Expenditures
United Conservative	Jeremy Nixon	10,473	47.62	-3.65	$71,085
New Democratic	Craig Coolahan	8,776	39.90	-2.63	$42,716
Alberta Party	Kara Levis	1,842	8.37	–	$18,147
Liberal	Michael Macdonald	396	1.80	-4.06	$1,598
Green	Janine St. Jean	294	1.34	+1.23	$750
Alberta Independence	C.W. Alexander	214	0.97	–	$3,445
Total		21,995	99.05	–	
Rejected, spoiled and declined		210	0.95		
Turnout		22,205	64.56		
Eligible voters		34,392			
United Conservative notional hold		Swing		-0.51	
Source(s) Source: Elections Alberta Note: Expenses is the sum of "Election Expenses", "Other Expenses" and "Transfers Issued". The Elections Act limits "Election Expenses" to $50,000.

=== 2015 ===
2015 Alberta general election
Party	Candidate	Votes	%	±%
New Democratic	Craig Coolahan	8,098	44.29%	34.14%
Progressive Conservative	Kyle Fawcett	4,878	26.68%	-14.54%
Wildrose	Jeremy Nixon	4,206	23.00%	-11.58%
Liberal	David Gamble	1,104	6.04%	-5.89%
Total		18,286	–	–
Rejected, spoiled and declined		168	41	51
Eligible electors / turnout		34,702	53.33%	-2.15%
New Democratic gain from Progressive Conservative		Swing		5.48%
Source(s) Source: "17 - Calgary-Klein, 2015 Alberta general election". officialresults.elections.ab.ca. Elections Alberta. Chief Electoral Officer (2016). 2015 General Election. A Report of the Chief Electoral Officer (PDF) (Report). Edmonton, Alta.: Elections Alberta. pp. 151–153.

2015 Alberta general election redistributed results
Party	Votes	%
New Democratic	8,003	42.53
Progressive Conservative	5,113	27.17
Wildrose	4,535	24.10
Liberal	1,103	5.86
Green	21	0.11
Others	44	0.23
Source(s) Source: Ridingbuilder

=== 2012 ===
2012 Alberta general election
Party	Candidate	Votes	%	±%
Progressive Conservative	Kyle Fawcett	6,859	41.21%	–
Wildrose Alliance	Jeremy Nixon	5,754	34.58%	–
Liberal	Christopher Tahn	1,985	11.93%	–
New Democratic	Marc Power	1,689	10.15%	–
Evergreen	Roger Gagné	355	2.13%	–
Total		16,642	–	–
Rejected, spoiled and declined		69	30	4
Eligible electors / turnout		30,131	55.47%	–
Progressive Conservative pickup new district.				
Source(s) Source: "17 - Calgary-Klein, 2012 Alberta general election". officialresults.elections.ab.ca. Elections Alberta.

== See also ==
- List of Alberta provincial electoral districts
- Canadian provincial electoral districts
