= Kyle Fawcett =

Canadian politician (born 1979/80)

The Honourable Kyle Fawcett ECA

Member of the Legislative Assembly of Alberta for Calgary-North Hill
- In office March 3, 2008 – May 5, 2015
- Preceded by: Richard Magnus
- Succeeded by: Craig Coolahan

Minister of the Environment and Sustainable Resource Development
- In office 2014–2015
- Preceded by: Robin Campbell
- Succeeded by: Shannon Phillips

Personal details
- Born: 1979 or 1980 (age 45–46)
- Party: Progressive Conservative
- Education: University of Calgary
- Occupation: Chief Executive Officer

Kyle Norman Fawcett ECA (born 1979 or 1980) is a Canadian politician and former Member of the Legislative Assembly of Alberta, representing the constituency of Calgary-Klein as a Progressive Conservative.

== Early life ==
Fawcett earned his Bachelor of Arts from the University of Calgary in 2002, with a focus on political science and economics. Prior to his election as a member of the Legislative Assembly of Alberta, Fawcett worked as a research consultant in support of both private industry and non-profit initiatives and served as a public school board trustee with the Calgary Board of Education.

== Political career ==
Fawcett first sought public office in 2004 for the position of public school board trustee with the Calgary Board of Education (CBE) for wards 5 and 10. At that time, he was the youngest individual to hold public office in Alberta. While serving as trustee, Fawcett held the positions of chair for both the audit and policy committees, board liaison to the CBE/Alberta Teachers' Association (ATA) liaison committee, and board representative for the ATA collective agreement interpretation committee. He first sought the position of MLA in the 2008 provincial election in the constituency of Calgary-North Hill. In that election, Fawcett received 38% of the vote.

In 2009, Fawcett was a member of the "Fiscal Four," a group of four MLAs dedicated to championing lower deficits, less red tape and increased program reviews.

His work as an MLA included Bill 203, the Municipal Governance (Franchise & Local Access Fee) Amendment Act 2010, Bill 207, the Young Albertans' Advisory Council Act; Motion 507 on Social Innovation and Entrepreneurship, Motion 509 on Urban Infrastructure Planning Organization, and Motion 519 on Non-renewable Resource Revenue and Savings.

On April 23, 2012 Fawcett was re-elected with 41% of the popular vote in the renamed constituency of Calgary-Klein, and was subsequently appointed Associate Minister of Finance & Vice Chair of Treasury Board by then-Premier Alison Redford. Prior to that Fawcett had served as Parliamentary Assistant to Treasury Board & Enterprise and Chair of the Cabinet Policy Committee on the Economy.

From June 23, 2013 to May 26, 2014, Fawcett served as Associate Minister of Recovery & Reconstruction for SW Alberta, having been appointed by Premier Redford in response to the June 2013 southern Alberta floods, when the government provided CA$20,000,000 in immediate assistance for flood relief.

On May 26, 2014, Fawcett was sworn in as Minister of Jobs, Skills, Training and Labour by Premier Dave Hancock and also continued as vice-chair of Treasury Board.

On September 15, 2014, Fawcett was sworn in as Minister of Environment and Sustainable Resource Development in the cabinet of Jim Prentice. He lost his seat in the May 5, 2015 provincial election that defeated Prentice's government.

Kyle Fawcett now serves as the Chief Executive Officer at Silvera for Seniors.

== Personal life ==
Fawcett is married to Ashley and they live in the Calgary community of Mount Pleasant.

Fawcett has a passion for sports. He has been an active member of his community, coaching youth baseball and football for 14 seasons. He has also mentored junior and senior high school students in northeast Calgary through the Alberta Mentorship Foundation for Youth program., and participated in the Impact Society's Heroes program. Every year since 2008, he has provided a scholarship to a first-year post-secondary student in his constituency.

In 2012, Fawcett was named as one of Avenue Magazine's (Calgary) Top 40 under 40. In 2002, he was also awarded a United Nations International Year of the Volunteer certificate by the Government of Canada for his commitment to improving our communities through volunteerism.

== Election results ==
=== 2015 General Election ===
2015 Alberta general election: Calgary-Klein
Party	Candidate	Votes	%	±%
New Democratic	Craig Coolahan	8,098	44.29%	34.14%
Progressive Conservative	Kyle Fawcett	4,878	26.68%	-14.54%
Wildrose	Jeremy Nixon	4,206	23.00%	-11.58%
Liberal	David Gamble	1,104	6.04%	-5.89%
Total		18,286	–	–
Rejected, spoiled and declined		168	41	51
Eligible electors / turnout		34,702	53.33%	-2.15%
New Democratic gain from Progressive Conservative		Swing		5.48%
Source(s) Source: "17 - Calgary-Klein, 2015 Alberta general election". officialresults.elections.ab.ca. Elections Alberta. Chief Electoral Officer (2016). 2015 General Election. A Report of the Chief Electoral Officer (PDF) (Report). Edmonton, Alta.: Elections Alberta. pp. 151–153.

=== 2012 general election ===
2012 Alberta general election results		Turnout %		Swing	
Affiliation	Candidate	Votes	%	Party	Personal
Progressive Conservative	Kyle Fawcett	6,852	41.21%	+2.89%	
Wildrose	Jeremy Nixon	5,755	34.61%	+25.87%	
Liberal	Christopher Tahn	1,980	11.91%	-20.08%	
New Democratic	Marc Power	1,687	10.15%	-2.21%	
Evergreen	Roger Gagné	354	2.13%	-4.42%	*
Total					
Rejected, spoiled and declined					
Eligible electors / Turnout			%		

=== 2008 General Election ===
2008 Alberta general election: Calgary-North Hill
Party	Candidate	Votes	%	±%
Progressive Conservative	Kyle Fawcett	4,281	38.32%	-4.88%
Liberal	Pat Murray	3,573	31.98%	0.22%
New Democratic	John Chan	1,381	12.36%	6.00%
Wildrose Alliance	Jane Morgan	976	8.74%	–
Green	Kevin Maloney	732	6.55%	-5.92%
Social Credit	Jim Wright	228	2.04%	–
Total		11,171	–	–
Rejected, spoiled and declined		37	–	–
Eligible electors / turnout		27,219	41.18%	-3.07%
Progressive Conservative hold		Swing		-2.55%
Source(s) Source: The Report on the March 3, 2008 Provincial General Election of the Twenty-seventh Legislative Assembly (PDF). Elections Alberta. July 28, 2008. pp. 242–245.
