= George C. King Bridge =

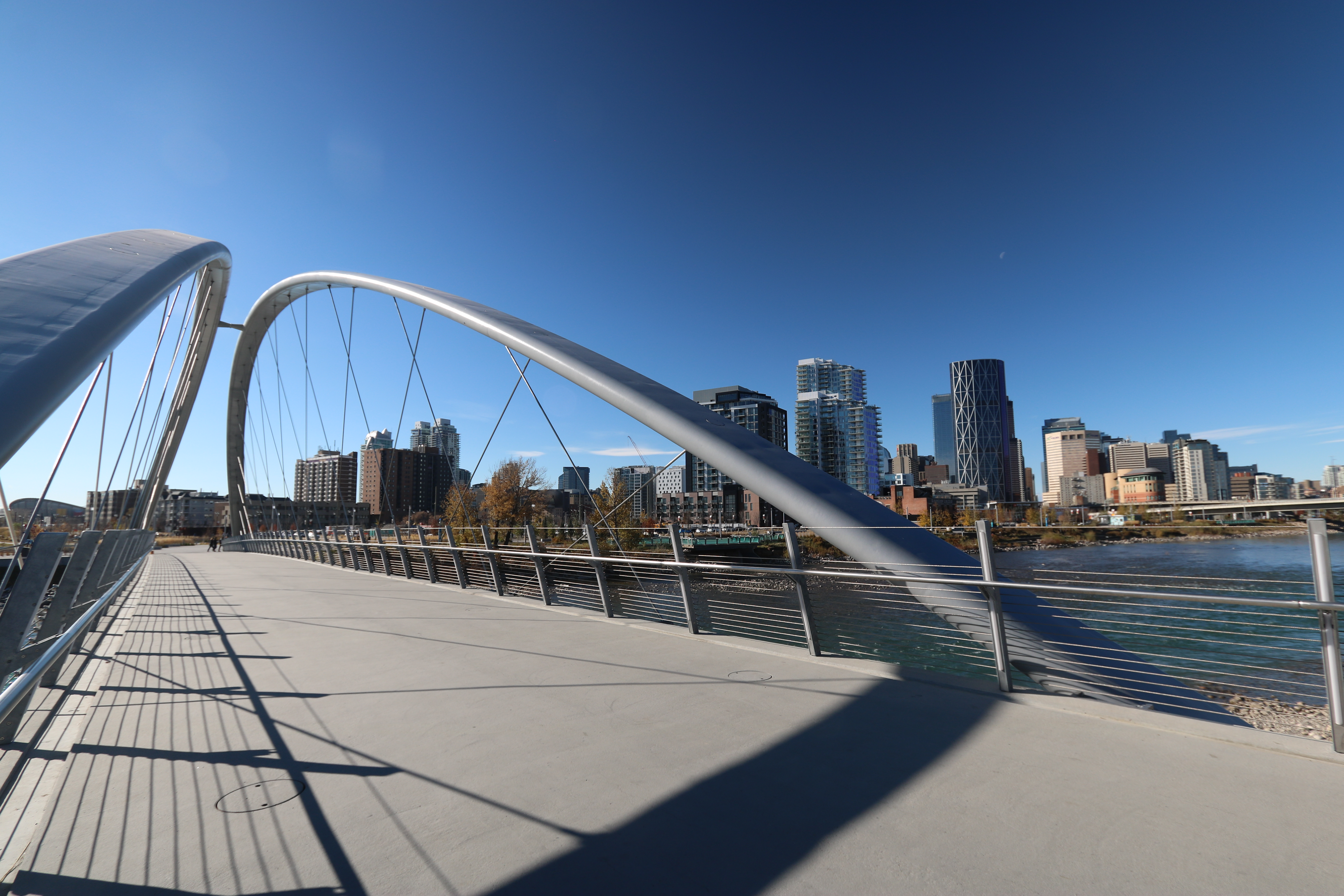
- George C. King Bridge
- Coordinates: 51°03′N 114°03′W
- Carries: Pedestrians
- Crosses: Bow River
- Locale: Calgary
- Official name: George C. King Bridge
- Other name(s): Skipping Stone Bridge, St. Patrick's Island Bridge
- Maintained by: City of Calgary

Characteristics
- Material: Steel and Concrete
- Total length: 182m
- Width: varies
- Height: varies
- No. of spans: 3

History
- Designer: RFR
- Constructed by: Graham Construction
- Construction start: 2012
- Construction end: 2014
- Opened: October 20, 2014

Location
- Interactive map of George C. King Bridge

The George C. King Bridge (formerly known as the St. Patrick's Island Bridge and colloquially known as the Skipping Stone Bridge) is a pedestrian bridge that spans the Bow River just northeast of Downtown Calgary, Alberta, Canada. The bridge connects the neighbourhoods of East Village to the south and Bridgeland to the north, with access from the bridge to St. Patrick's Island Park in the middle of the bridge via a ramp. The bridge was built by the Calgary Municipal Land Corporation (CMLC) as part of the wider redevelopment of the East Village neighbourhood, in tandem with a $45 million redevelopment of St. Patrick's Island Park. Planning for the new bridge began in 2009, with construction getting underway in 2012. The bridge opened on October 20, 2014 and cost a total of $25 million. The bridge is known locally as the Skipping Stone Bridge due to the form of the bridge, which looks like a stone skipping across the river.

== 2013 flood impacts ==
During June 2013, Calgary and most of Southwestern Alberta were impacted by catastrophic floods. About 75 000 of Calgary's population of 1.2 million people at the time had to be evacuated from their homes as the rivers burst over their banks. The George C. King Bridge was under construction at the time and was partially on supports which were washed out by the river flow. The partially completed bridge deck sagged and cracked. After the flood, it was decided that the entire bridge deck which had been completed to that time would have to be replaced, setting the project back by more than a year. However, 16 months later the bridge was opened to the public amid much fanfare, it was the first of the many bridges destroyed or impacted by the flood to be reconstructed.

== 2019 bridge rehabilitation ==
Cracks in the base of the bridge were discovered in 2019 and were repaired without closing the bridge. It was unsure if the cracks were due to a design issue, construction problem, or possibly after effects from the 2013 flood and subsequent river flows.

== See also ==
- Bridgeland/Riverside
- Calgary's East Village
- Jack and Jean Leslie RiverWalk
- St. Patrick's Island Park
- List of bridges in Canada
