= Craig Coolahan =

Canadian politician

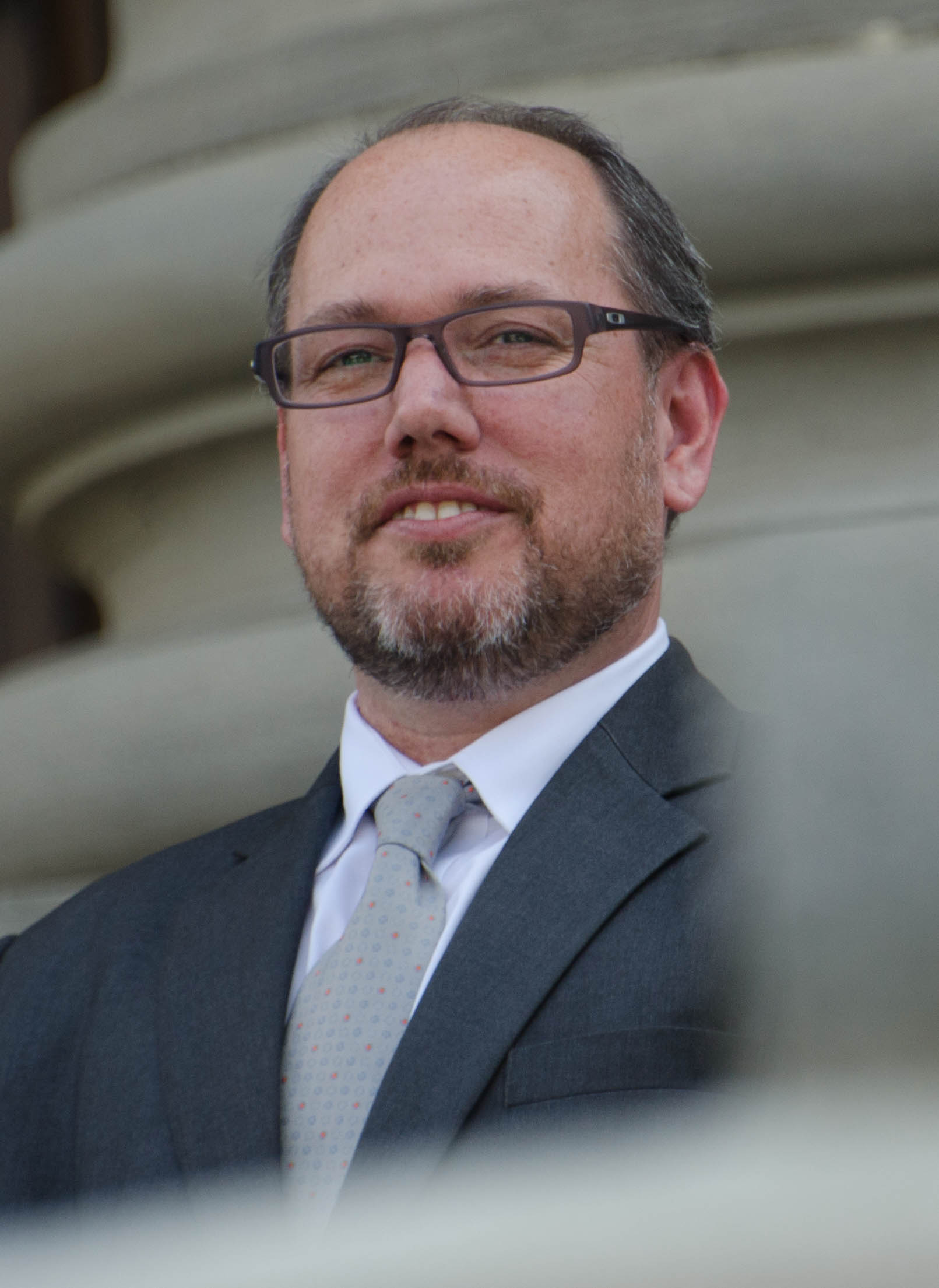
- Coolahan in 2015

Member of the Legislative Assembly of Alberta for Calgary-Klein
- In office May 5, 2015 – March 19, 2019
- Preceded by: Kyle Fawcett
- Succeeded by: Jeremy Nixon

Personal details
- Born: Craig Thomas Coolahan; November 16, 1970 (age 55) Toronto, Ontario, Canada
- Party: New Democratic
- Occupation: Union Representative

Craig Thomas Coolahan (born November 16, 1970) is a Canadian politician who was elected in the 2015 Alberta general election to the Legislative Assembly of Alberta representing the electoral district of Calgary-Klein.

Coolahan was born in Toronto to parents Thomas and Suzanne and grew up in the suburb of Scarborough. He has one brother, Christopher, and they both attended Hunter's Glen Public School, Charles Gordon Junior High, and David and Mary Thomson High School.

After high school he worked at an insurance company in Toronto for a few years and returned to school in 1993. He attended Okanagan University College (now UBC Okanagan) and achieved a Bachelor of Arts degree in English from UBC in conjunction with OUC. In 2001 he completed a Bachelor of Journalism Degree from University College of the Cariboo in Kamloops (now Thompson Rivers University).

Coolahan spent several years as a writer and editor in many capacities, including 10 years as a technical writer. He also wrote for newspapers, magazines and co-wrote two vocational how-to books.

In 2012, Coolahan left writing and editing and became a Business Agent for the United Utilities Workers' Association.

After moving to Calgary in 2003, he became politically active on issues such as health care, education and housing.

He ran for the Alberta NDP in the 2012 provincial general election in the riding of Calgary-Elbow, losing to the would-be Premier Alison Redford.

He ran again in 2015, winning the seat for Calgary-Klein, when the provincial NDP swept to a majority.

Coolahan married Sarah Somasundaram in 2010 and they have two children: Mehna Grace (b.2011) and Kieran Shanta Thomas (b.2014). They live in Calgary in the neighbourhood of Capitol Hill.

As a backbench MLA, Coolahan introduced several bills. In November 2016 he introduced Bill 208 to "introduce mandatory workplace harassment policies for every industry," and while the bill died after its first reading it informed the NDP government's "An Act to Protect The Health and Well-Being of Working Albertans" which became law in June 2018. In 2018, Coolahan introduced Bill 206: Preventing the Promotion of Hate Amendment Act to "give the registrar of Alberta Societies within Service Alberta power to look at whether a group has a lawful purpose" when it registers to become a legally recognized organization with certain rights in Alberta. It also died after its first reading.

== Electoral record ==
2019 Alberta general election: Calgary-Klein
Party	Candidate	Votes	%	±%	Expenditures
United Conservative	Jeremy Nixon	10,473	47.62	-3.65	$71,085
New Democratic	Craig Coolahan	8,776	39.90	-2.63	$42,716
Alberta Party	Kara Levis	1,842	8.37	–	$18,147
Liberal	Michael Macdonald	396	1.80	-4.06	$1,598
Green	Janine St. Jean	294	1.34	+1.23	$750
Alberta Independence	C.W. Alexander	214	0.97	–	$3,445
Total		21,995	99.05	–	
Rejected, spoiled and declined		210	0.95		
Turnout		22,205	64.56		
Eligible voters		34,392			
United Conservative notional hold		Swing		-0.51	
Source(s) Source: Elections Alberta Note: Expenses is the sum of "Election Expenses", "Other Expenses" and "Transfers Issued". The Elections Act limits "Election Expenses" to $50,000.

2015 Alberta general election: Calgary-Klein
Party	Candidate	Votes	%	±%
New Democratic	Craig Coolahan	8,098	44.29%	34.14%
Progressive Conservative	Kyle Fawcett	4,878	26.68%	-14.54%
Wildrose	Jeremy Nixon	4,206	23.00%	-11.58%
Liberal	David Gamble	1,104	6.04%	-5.89%
Total		18,286	–	–
Rejected, spoiled and declined		168	41	51
Eligible electors / turnout		34,702	53.33%	-2.15%
New Democratic gain from Progressive Conservative		Swing		5.48%
Source(s) Source: "17 - Calgary-Klein, 2015 Alberta general election". officialresults.elections.ab.ca. Elections Alberta. Chief Electoral Officer (2016). 2015 General Election. A Report of the Chief Electoral Officer (PDF) (Report). Edmonton, Alta.: Elections Alberta. pp. 151–153.

2012 Alberta general election: Calgary-Elbow
Party	Candidate	Votes	%	±%
Progressive Conservative	Alison Redford	11,198	58.09	+16.01
Wildrose	James Cole	5,509	28.58	+21.97
Liberal	Beena Ashar	1,067	5.53	−33.67
New Democratic	Craig Coolahan	761	3.95	+1.96
Alberta Party	Greg Clark	518	2.69	–
Evergreen	William Hamilton	225	1.17	−2.44
Total valid votes		19,278	100.00	–
Total rejected ballots		257	–	–
Turnout		19,535	58.44	+12.60
Eligible voters		33,430	–	–
