= N3 (Calgary) =

Coordinates: 51.0455°N 114.0535°W

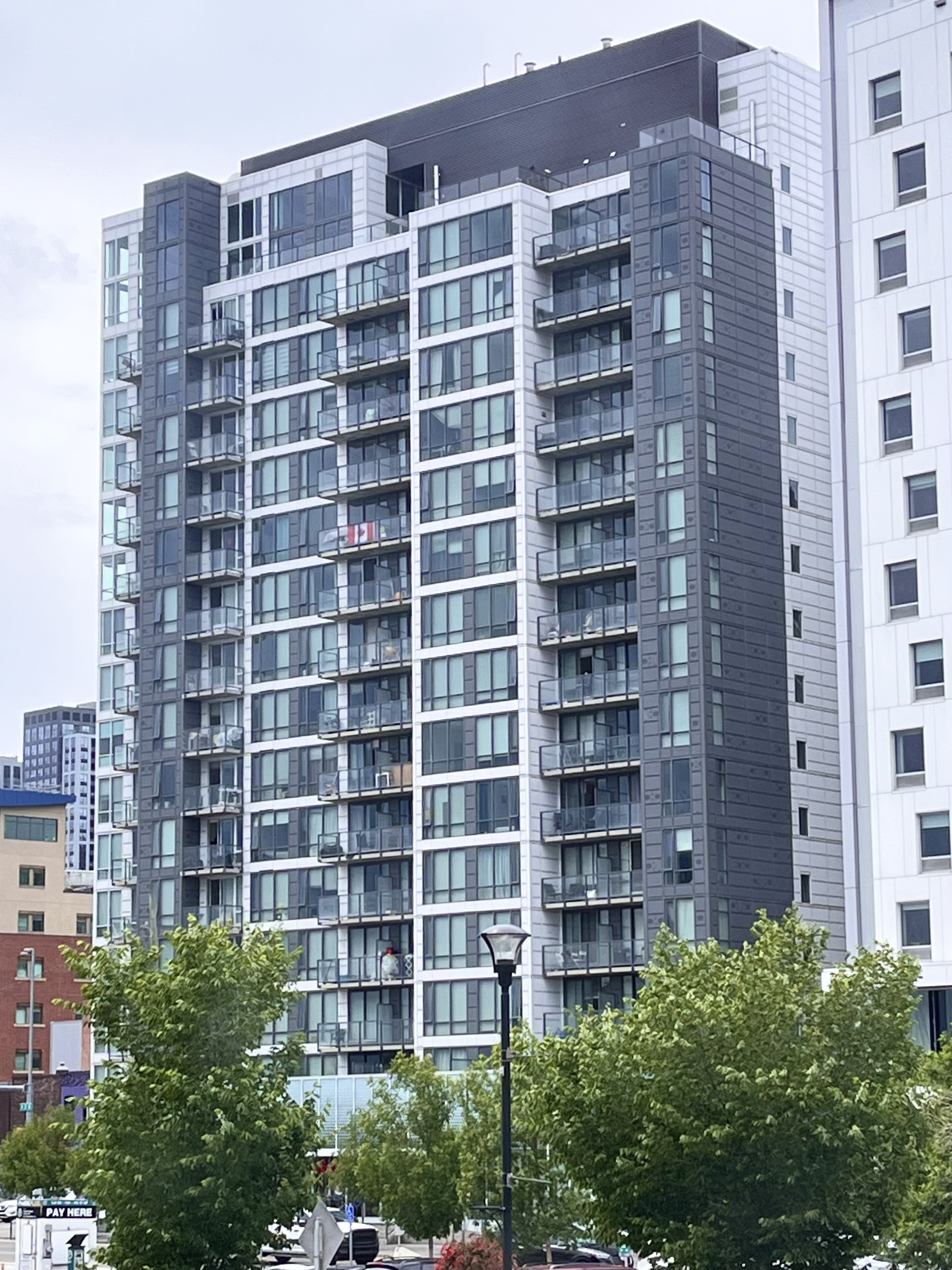
N3

N3 is a condominium building in Calgary, Alberta. It is Calgary's first parking-free condominium. Located in the East Village, it is close to the CTrain and Downtown. The building consists of 167 units, which would normally require 100 parking spaces but Calgary City Council relaxed the rules.
