= Corey Hogan =

Canadian politician

Corey Hogan MP

Parliamentary Secretary to the Minister of Energy and Natural Resources
- Incumbent
- Assumed office June 5, 2025 Serving with Claude Guay
- Minister: Tim Hodgson
- Preceded by: Marc Serré

Member of Parliament for Calgary Confederation
- Incumbent
- Assumed office April 28, 2025
- Preceded by: Len Webber

Personal details
- Born: Corey Malcolm John Hogan; December 12, 1981 (age 44) Ottawa, Ontario, Canada
- Party: Liberal
- Spouse: Lori Rosmus
- Children: 3
- Education: University of Western Ontario (M.B.A)
- Occupation: University executive, communications specialist
- Website: coreyhogan.liberal.ca

Corey Malcolm John Hogan MP (born December 12, 1981) is a Canadian politician from the Liberal Party of Canada. He was elected Member of Parliament for Calgary Confederation in the 2025 Canadian federal election.

== Early life and career ==
Corey Hogan was born on December 12, 1981 in Ottawa, Ontario. His father was a professor of medicine at the University of Calgary. Hogan attended the university briefly before pursuing a Master of Business Administration at the University of Western Ontario.

Hogan was formerly the executive director of the Alberta Liberal Party. Ahead of the 2015 federal election he was the riding president for Calgary Confederation and helped to secure Liberal candidate Matt Grant's nomination who came second to Len Webber. By 2016 Hogan was in Alberta's civil service as deputy minister under premiers Rachel Notley of the Alberta New Democratic Party and Jason Kenney of the United Conservative Party, working as head of government communications. He left that role in 2020, shortly after the UCP won the 2019 Alberta general election and joined the University of Calgary as Senior Associate Vice President of Communications. Hogan was promoted to Vice President of Communications and Community Engagement in 2024. After leaving his political roles, Hogan was co-host on a Canadian political podcast called The Strategists.

== Federal politics ==
Hogan became the Liberal Party of Canada candidate in Calgary Confederation on April 1, 2025, after the previous candidate, Thomas Keeper, was deselected for failing to disclose an old domestic assault charge to the party. Hogan defeated Conservative candidate Jeremy Nixon in the election that year. He was the only Liberal elected in Calgary and one of two Alberta Liberal MPs in the 45th Canadian Parliament.

On June 5, 2025, Hogan was named Parliamentary Secretary to the Minister of Energy and Natural Resources.

== Political views ==
=== Education ===
In his 2025 federal election campaign, Hogan stated that he supported increased investment in higher education to make it more accessible, and supported funding more research opportunities for undergraduate and graduate students.

=== Foreign affairs ===
In April 2025, Hogan said that he supported a two-state solution for the Israeli–Palestinian conflict and a "durable ceasefire" in the Gaza war. He declined to call Israel's actions in Gaza a genocide, pending the International Court of Justice ruling in South Africa's genocide case against Israel, but described the situation as "horrific". Hogan defended his role in the University of Calgary's decision to dismantle a pro-Palestinian encampment on campus using tactical police as purely being in his communications capacity, saying that his role did not have decision-making authority.

=== Natural resources ===
Hogan supported the Memorandum of understanding with Alberta on pipelines.

== Electoral record ==
2025 Canadian federal election: Calgary Confederation
Party	Candidate	Votes	%	±%	Expenditures
Liberal	Corey Hogan	33,112	48.10	+20.21	$131,979.58
Conservative	Jeremy Nixon	31,839	46.25	+0.56	$123,194.59
New Democratic	Keira Gunn	2,844	4.13	–13.59	$35,445.87
Green	Richard Willott	400	0.58	–3.10	none listed
People's	Artyom Ovsepyan	302	0.44	–4.20	$1,192.14
Canadian Future	Jeffrey Reid Marsh	198	0.29	–	$3,284.85
Marxist–Leninist	Kevan Hunter	144	0.21	–0.08	none listed
Total valid votes/expense limit		68,839	99.30	–	$137,334.45
Total rejected ballots		483	0.70	+0.10	
Turnout		69,322	74.48	+7.08	
Eligible voters		93,071			
Liberal gain from Conservative		Swing		+9.92	
Source: Elections Canada
