= Calgary Tool Library =

Tool lending system in Alberta, Canada

Calgary Tool Library and Makerspace
- 51.0521°N 114.0408°W
- Location: Calgary, Alberta, Canada
- Established: June 2014
- Branches: 1

Collection
- Size: 500-

Access and use
- Population served: 1214839

Other information
- Website: http://calgarytoollibrary.org/

Calgary Tool Library (CTL) is a tool lending public library system based in Calgary, Alberta, Canada. Tool libraries loan specialized tools for both experienced and inexperienced community members who are interested in home repair, maintenance, building projects, community projects, gardening and landscaping. Makerspaces provide access to tools and resources and host planned programming, workshops, free play and community group times related to making, DIY, and innovation. The CTL offers tool library memberships to any resident of Calgary and area and to organizations. The CTL is supported by The Calgary Foundation, First Calgary Financial, Brookfield Residential, and Remington Development Corporation.

== History ==
In June 2014, the CTL was established in the lower level of the Bridgeland-Riverside Community Association, 917 Centre Ave NE, Calgary, Alberta.

== Governance ==
The CTL is operated by a tool committee consisting of 7 volunteers.

== Services ==
=== Collections ===
The tool library adapted Share Starter's free "Tool Library Starter Kit" which includes start up guidelines, frequently asked questions, and sample documents. The library uses "Local Tools" from "myTurn.com, PBC", a web-based inventory management system to track tool library members and to automatically display the tool availability online. The library has 500- specialized tools from power drills and ladders to pressure washers and roto-tillers to loan to community members with all skill levels welcomed. The inventory of equipment includes Automotive, Bike, Carpentry and Woodworking, Electrical and Soldering, Home Maintenance, Plumbing, Remodeling, Sustainable Living, Yard and Garden. The types of tools include Hand Tools, Power Tools and Cars.

=== Training ===
The Calgary Tool Library offers affordable workshops open both to Tool Library members and the public on tool related skills and projects. In the Intro to Tools workshop, participants built a planter box; while in Routers 101, attendees created a cutting board.

== Mission ==
The Tool library performs the following main tasks:

- Tool Lending: all kinds for use in volunteer projects, facility maintenance and improvement projects, community improvement events, and special events.
- Tool Advocacy: for the complete and timely return of all borrowed tools, to guarantee the long-term sustainability of available inventory. Staff also seeks compensation for lost tools and tools returned late.
- Tool Maintenance: performing routine maintenance and repairs on all equipment to ensure good condition and to extend the lifespan of the inventory. This function is typically performed by volunteers and community service workers.

== Branches ==
- Calgary Tool Library, 917 Centre Ave NE, Calgary, Alberta.

The Calgary Tool Library is current closed due to Covid.

== See also ==
- List of tool-lending libraries
