= Calgary Confederation =

Federal electoral district in Alberta, Canada

Alberta electoral district
- Interactive map of riding boundaries from the 2025 federal election

Federal electoral district
- Legislature: House of Commons
MP
Corey Hogan
Liberal
- District created: 2013
- First contested: 2015
- Last contested: 2025
- District webpage: profile, map

Demographics
- Population (2011): 111,785
- Electors (2019): 91,789
- Area (km²): 54
- Pop. density (per km²): 2,070.1
- Census division: Division No. 6
- Census subdivision: Calgary (part)

Calgary Confederation is a federal electoral district in Alberta, Canada, that has been represented in the House of Commons of Canada since 2015. It was created in 2012 from the electoral districts of Calgary Centre-North (70%), Calgary West (23%) and Calgary—Nose Hill (8%).

== Demographics ==
Panethnic groups in Calgary Confederation (2011−2021)
| Panethnic group | 2021 | | 2016 | | 2011 | |
| Panethnic group | Pop. | % | Pop. | % | Pop. | % |
|---|---|---|---|---|---|---|
| European (Note: Statistic includes all persons that did not make up part of a visible minority or an indigenous identity.) | 82,215 | 68.15% | 85,475 | 72.96% | 85,035 | 78.27% |
| East Asian (Note: Statistic includes total responses of "Chinese", "Korean", and "Japanese" under visible minority section on census.) | 13,435 | 11.14% | 11,350 | 9.69% | 9,950 | 9.16% |
| South Asian | 5,200 | 4.31% | 4,365 | 3.73% | 3,050 | 2.81% |
| Southeast Asian (Note: Statistic includes total responses of "Filipino" and "Southeast Asian" under visible minority section on census.) | 4,370 | 3.62% | 3,530 | 3.01% | 2,425 | 2.23% |
| Indigenous | 4,075 | 3.38% | 3,255 | 2.78% | 2,575 | 2.37% |
| African | 3,420 | 2.84% | 3,400 | 2.9% | 2,035 | 1.87% |
| Middle Eastern (Note: Statistic includes total responses of "West Asian" and "Arab" under visible minority section on census.) | 3,135 | 2.6% | 2,770 | 2.36% | 1,365 | 1.26% |
| Latin American | 2,435 | 2.02% | 1,825 | 1.56% | 1,360 | 1.25% |
| Other (Note: Statistic includes total responses of "Visible minority, n.i.e." and "Multiple visible minorities" under visible minority section on census.) | 2,335 | 1.94% | 1,190 | 1.02% | 855 | 0.79% |
| Total responses | 120,630 | 97.23% | 117,160 | 96.01% | 108,650 | 97.2% |
| Total population | 124,064 | 100% | 122,023 | 100% | 111,785 | 100% |
Notes: Totals greater than 100% due to multiple origin responses. Demographics based on 2012 Canadian federal electoral redistribution riding boundaries.

== Members of Parliament ==
This riding has elected the following members of the House of Commons of Canada:

| Parliament | Years | Member | Party |
|---|---|---|---|
Calgary Confederation; Riding created from Calgary Centre-North, Calgary West and Calgary—Nose Hill
| 42nd | 2015–2019 | Len Webber | Conservative |
| 43rd | 2019–2021 | Len Webber | Conservative |
| 44th | 2021–2025 | Len Webber | Conservative |
| 45th | 2025–present | Corey Hogan | Liberal |

== Election results ==
View source data.
Graph of election results in Calgary Confederation (minor parties that never got 2% of the vote or didn't run consistently are omitted)

=== 2023 representation order ===
2025 Canadian federal election
| Party | Candidate | Votes | % | ±% | Expenditures |
|---|---|---|---|---|---|
| Liberal | Corey Hogan | 33,112 | 48.10 | +20.21 | $131,979.58 |
| Conservative | Jeremy Nixon | 31,839 | 46.25 | +0.56 | $123,194.59 |
| New Democratic | Keira Gunn | 2,844 | 4.13 | –13.59 | $35,445.87 |
| Green | Richard Willott | 400 | 0.58 | –3.10 | none listed |
| People's | Artyom Ovsepyan | 302 | 0.44 | –4.20 | $1,192.14 |
| Canadian Future | Jeffrey Reid Marsh | 198 | 0.29 | – | $3,284.85 |
| Marxist–Leninist | Kevan Hunter | 144 | 0.21 | –0.08 | none listed |
| Total valid votes/expense limit | | 68,839 | 99.30 | – | $137,334.45 |
| Total rejected ballots | | 483 | 0.70 | +0.10 | |
| Turnout | | 69,322 | 74.48 | +7.08 | |
| Eligible voters | | 93,071 | | | |
| Liberal gain from Conservative | | Swing | | +9.92 | |
Source: Elections Canada

2021 federal election redistributed results
| Party | Vote | % |
|---|---|---|
| Conservative | 27,326 | 45.69 |
| Liberal | 16,680 | 27.89 |
| New Democratic | 10,596 | 17.72 |
| People's | 2,777 | 4.64 |
| Green | 2,202 | 3.68 |
| Others | 228 | 0.38 |

=== 2013 representation order ===
2021 Canadian federal election
| Party | Candidate | Votes | % | ±% | Expenditures |
|---|---|---|---|---|---|
| Conservative | Len Webber | 28,367 | 46.03 | –9.08 | $67,252.27 |
| Liberal | Murray Sigler | 17,560 | 28.49 | +5.87 | $72,571.56 |
| New Democratic | Gulshan Akter | 10,561 | 17.14 | +6.04 | $4,394.78 |
| People's | Edward Gao | 2,670 | 4.33 | +2.61 | $2,377.79 |
| Green | Natalie Odd | 2,295 | 3.72 | –4.93 | $16,335.22 |
| Marxist–Leninist | Kevan Hunter | 178 | 0.29 | +0.11 | none listed |
| Total valid votes/expense limit | | 61,631 | 99.40 | – | $119,393.54 |
| Total rejected ballots | | 369 | 0.60 | –0.02 | |
| Turnout | | 62,000 | 67.40 | –3.77 | |
| Eligible voters | | 91,983 | | | |
| Conservative hold | | Swing | | –7.48 | |
Source: Elections Canada

2019 Canadian federal election
| Party | Candidate | Votes | % | ±% | Expenditures |
|---|---|---|---|---|---|
| Conservative | Len Webber | 36,312 | 55.11 | +9.20 | $76,635.02 |
| Liberal | Jordan Stein | 14,908 | 22.62 | –20.91 | $74,229.77 |
| New Democratic | Gurcharan Singh Sidhu | 7,312 | 11.10 | +3.96 | $1,171.80 |
| Green | Natalie Odd | 5,700 | 8.65 | +5.44 | $27,621.83 |
| People's | Colin Korol | 1,136 | 1.72 | – | none listed |
| Libertarian | Tim Moen | 407 | 0.62 | – | none listed |
| Marxist–Leninist | Kevan Hunter | 117 | 0.18 | –0.03 | none listed |
| Total valid votes/expense limit | | 65,892 | 99.38 | – | $116,669.75 |
| Total rejected ballots | | 410 | 0.62 | +0.30 | |
| Turnout | | 66,302 | 71.17 | –2.43 | |
| Eligible voters | | 93,160 | | | |
| Conservative hold | | Swing | | +15.06 | |
Source: Elections Canada

2015 Canadian federal election
| Party | Candidate | Votes | % | ±% | Expenditures |
|---|---|---|---|---|---|
| Conservative | Len Webber | 30,669 | 45.91 | –6.52 | $153,636.85 |
| Liberal | Matt Grant | 29,083 | 43.53 | +25.89 | $159,579.52 |
| New Democratic | Kirk Heuser | 4,770 | 7.14 | –8.69 | $60,522.97 |
| Green | Natalie Odd | 2,146 | 3.21 | –10.49 | $21,308.54 |
| Marxist–Leninist | Kevan Hunter | 140 | 0.21 | –0.19 | none listed |
| Total valid votes/expense limit | | 66,808 | 99.68 | – | $228,532.64 |
| Total rejected ballots | | 216 | 0.32 | – | |
| Turnout | | 67,024 | 73.60 | – | |
| Eligible voters | | 91,061 | | | |
| Conservative hold | | Swing | | –16.21 | |
Source: Elections Canada

2011 federal election redistributed results
| Party | Vote | % |
|---|---|---|
| Conservative | 26,619 | 52.43 |
| Liberal | 8,957 | 17.64 |
| New Democratic | 8,036 | 15.83 |
| Green | 6,956 | 13.70 |
| Marxist–Leninist | 202 | 0.40 |

== See also ==
- List of Canadian electoral districts
- Historical federal electoral districts of Canada
