= National Music Centre =

Canadian music museum opened 2016

- Centre nationale de musique

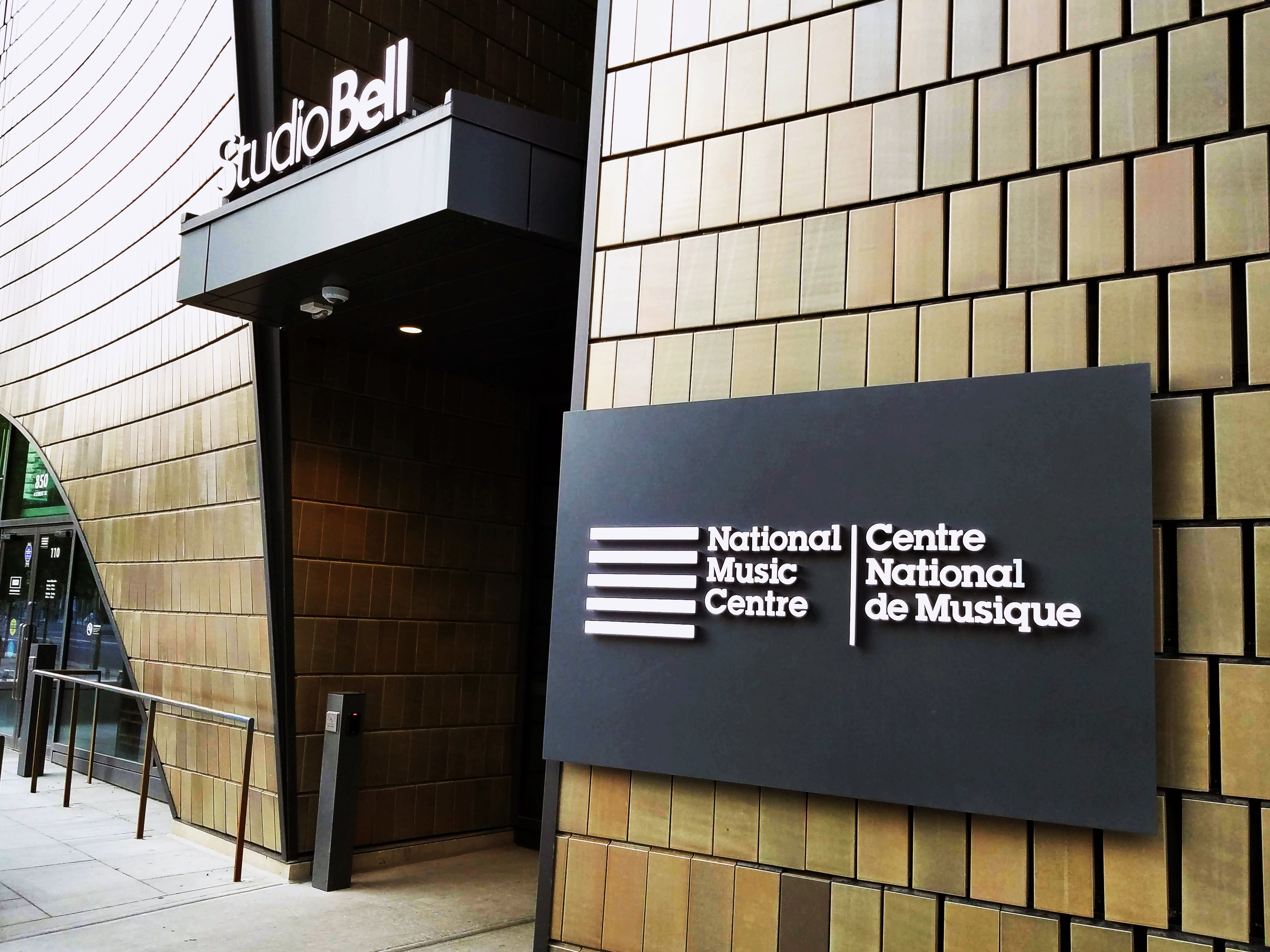
- Street entrance
- Alternative names: Studio Bell

General information
- Status: Completed
- Type: Music Museum
- Location: Calgary, Alberta
- Coordinates: 51.0453°N 114.0549°W
- Construction started: 2013
- Completed: 2016
- Cost: $191 million
- Owner: National Music Centre

Technical details
- Floor count: 5
- Floor area: 160,000 sq ft (15,000 m^{2})

Design and construction
- Architecture firm: Allied Works Architecture
- Services engineer: SMP Engineering

Website
- nmc.ca

The National Music Centre (NMC; French: Centre national de musique) is a non-profit museum, performance venue, and recording studio located in Calgary, Alberta, Canada. The centre's permanent building, branded Studio Bell, is located at 850 4th Street S.E. in Downtown East Village.

== History ==
=== Beginnings ===
The National Music Centre and its collections origins can be traced to the installation of a pipe organ (known as the Carthy Organ) in Calgary's Jack Singer Concert Hall in 1987. The installation of this instrument was the genesis of the International Organ Festival and Competition operated by TriumphEnt from 1990 to 2002. It also subsequently led to the creation of a new organization known as the Chinook Keyboard Centre, which began developing a collection of keyboard instruments in mid-1996. Chinook Keyboard Centre was soon renamed Cantos Music Museum and expanded the scope of its collection beyond keyboard instruments to include electronic instruments and sound equipment beginning in the year 2000, it also began to offer limited programming in the way of gallery tours and concerts.

=== Customs House ===
In 2003, TriumphEnt and Cantos Music Museum joined forces to become the Cantos Music Foundation, located at the historic Customs House building, 134-11th Avenue S.E, and expanded its presentation of music programs using the collection and gallery spaces. In 2005, an exhibition commemorating 100 years of music in Alberta to mark the Centennial led to plans to expand the organization's scope to chronicle, celebrate, and foster a broader vision for music in Canada. In February 2012, Cantos became the National Music Centre.

As the centre began to outgrow its space, it planned to construct a 60,000 square-foot facility in Calgary's East Village with a projected cost of $168 million. With a design by Portland architect Brad Cloepfil, construction began on February 22, 2013. The final steel beam was set into place on December 12, 2014. The building eventually cost $191 million.

The National Music Centre held its last public tour at the Customs House on December 28, 2014. After that, the location shut down in order to begin the move to the new centre in Calgary's East Village.

=== Studio Bell ===
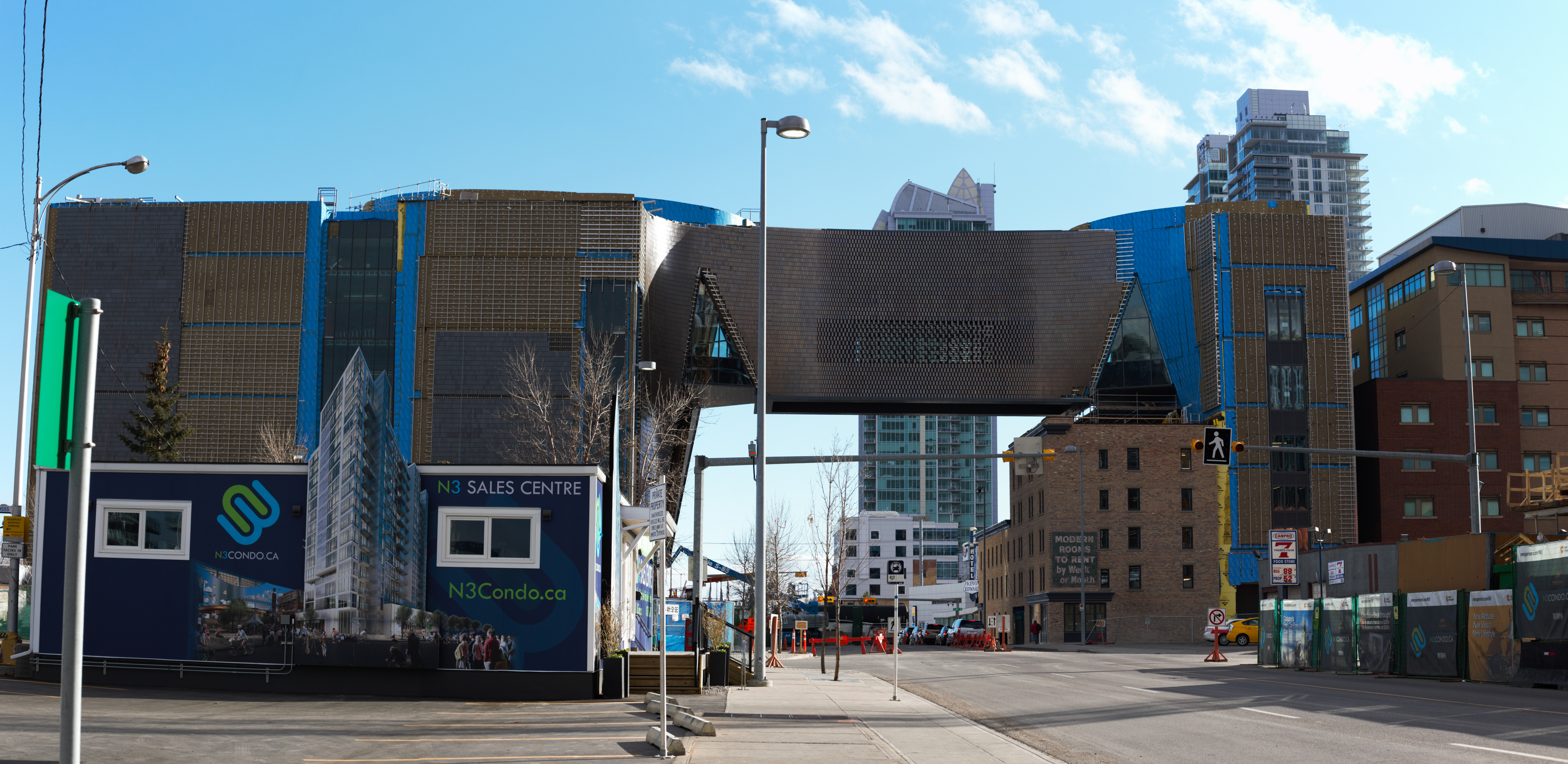
Studio Bell under construction in early 2016

The National Music Centre's Studio Bell opened on July 1, 2016 (Canada Day), with an estimated 5,600 people attending. Jim Cuddy of Blue Rodeo and Great Big Sea's Alan Doyle performed at the official opening.

National Music Centre's new space showcases the collection, which includes over 2,000 rare equipment, instruments and artifacts including the Rolling Stones Mobile Studio, a rare Trident A-Range recording / mixing console, the TONTO synthesizer, and one of Elton John's pianos, along with the Canadian Music Hall of Fame and Canadian Country Music Hall of Fame collections. Its interior is clad with 226,000 custom glazed terracotta tiles which were made in Germany and fired in the Netherlands. In 2016, telecommunications giant Bell Canada paid $10 million for 12 years of naming rights for the centre.

The centre organizes interactive education programming, artist incubation, exhibitions and performances daily, as well as an artist-in-residence program.

Features of the National Music Centre include broadcast facilities of the CKUA Radio Network and a 300-seat performance hall that has already hosted a variety of events, including one of the Tragically Hip's last concerts. Included as part of the centre is the historic King Edward Hotel, which was dismantled and rebuilt, and operates as a seven nights a week live music venue.

The National Music Centre also houses a world-class recording studio, featuring 3 control rooms and 3 live rooms. The organization maintains a "living collection" - musical instruments and equipment submitted as museum pieces which are professionally maintained to be fully operational in a studio environment. This gives artists and engineers recording at the facility the opportunity to use and experiment with a plethora of historical equipment, ranging from a 400-year-old harpsicord to TONTO, the first (and largest) multitimbral polyphonic analog synthesizer ever created.

== See also ==
- List of music museums
