= Jack and Jean Leslie RiverWalk =

Coordinates: 51.0491609°N 114.0537357°W

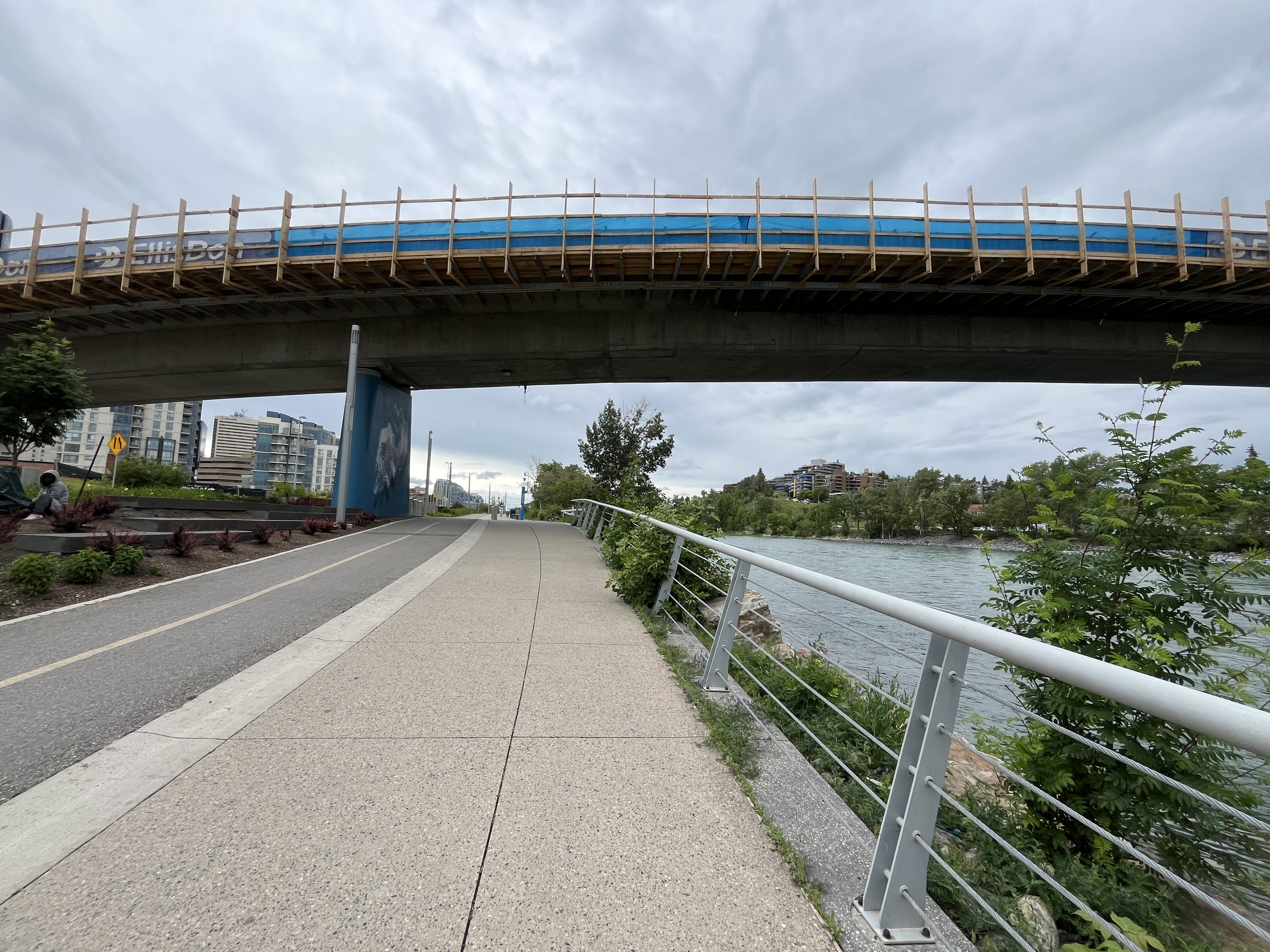
Jack and Jean Leslie RiverWalk

The Jack and Jean Leslie RiverWalk (also known simply as RiverWalk) is a 2 kilometres (1.2 mi) section of the Bow River pathway between the Centre Street Bridge and the 9th Avenue SE Bridge, along the Bow and Elbow rivers in Downtown Calgary, Alberta, Canada. Phase III of stage 1 of the project was opened by the Calgary Municipal Land Corporation (CMLC) on September 27, 2012. Upon completion of all three stages of the project, the RiverWalk will stretch four kilometres, from the Centre Street Bridge on the Bow River to Lindsay Park along the Elbow River. In March 2015, the Jack and Jean Leslie RiverWalk was the recipient of the National Merit Award from the Canadian Society of Landscape Architects. The RiverWalk is part of a larger development of Calgary's East Village as part of that neighbourhood's area redevelopment plan.

== Stages ==
=== Stage One ===
All three phases of stage one of the project have been complete and open to the public since September 2012. Phase one stretches from the old St. Patrick's Island Bridge to Riverfront Lane, phase two stretches from Riverfront Lane to the Centre Street Bridge, and phase three stretches from the old St. Patrick's Island Bridge to the 9th Avenue SE Bridge.

=== Stage Two ===
Stage two will extend the RiverWalk into the Victoria Park area of Calgary's Beltline neighbourhood, the most densely populated neighbourhood in the province of Alberta. As of January 2017, CMLC has not released a timeline as to when stage two of RiverWalk will begin construction.

=== Stage Three ===
Stage three will extend Riverwalk from Victoria Park to Lindsay Park along the Elbow River, thereby completing the total 4-kilometer (2.5 miles) stretch. As of January 2017, CMLC has not released a timeline as to when stage two of RiverWalk will begin construction, however, it will be completed after stage two.

== See also ==
- Calgary's East Village
- George C. King Bridge
- St. Patrick's Island Park
