= Len Webber =

Canadian politician

The Honourable Len Webber ECA
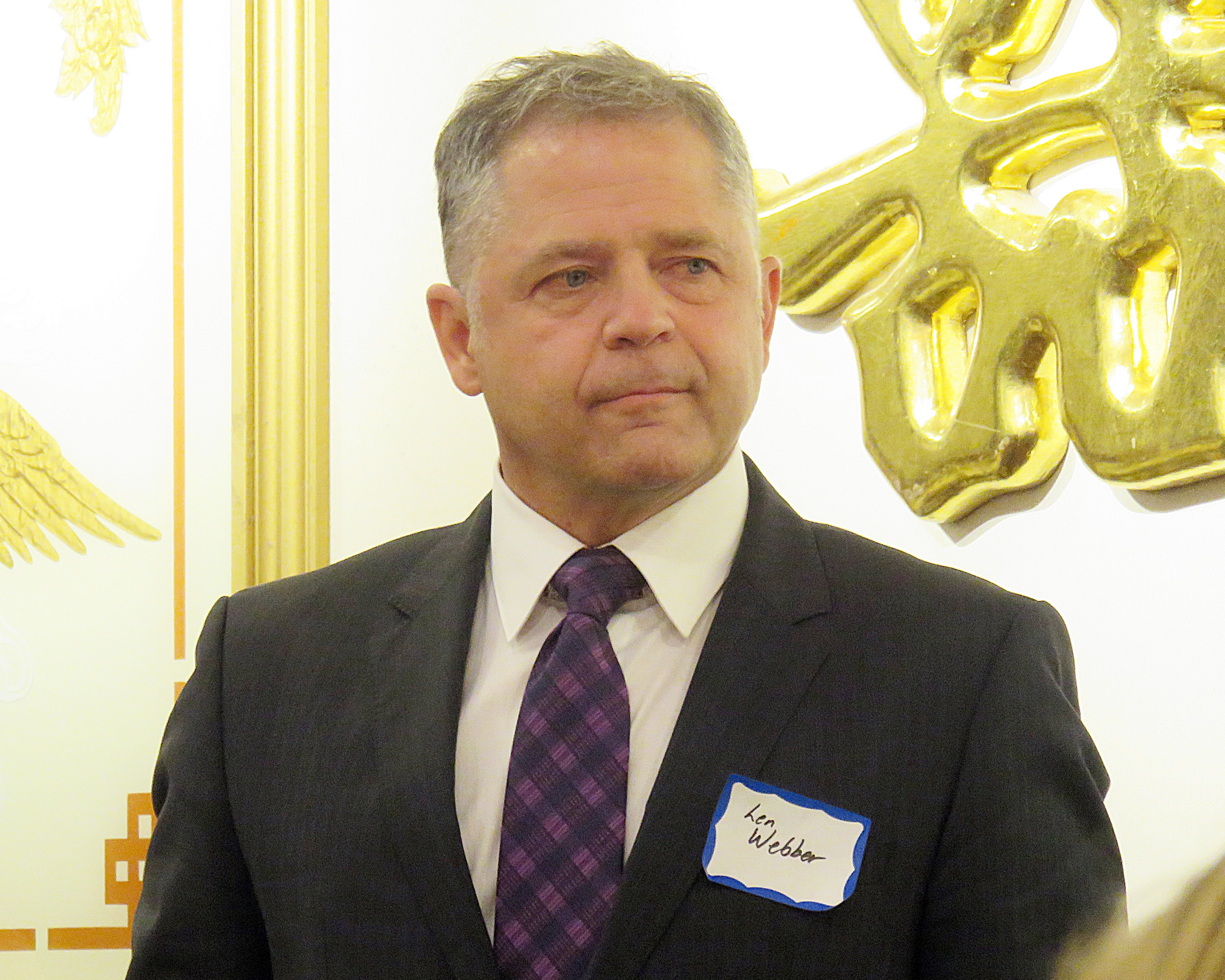
- Webber in 2015

Member of Parliament for Calgary Confederation
- In office October 19, 2015 – March 23, 2025
- Preceded by: Riding Established
- Succeeded by: Corey Hogan

Member of the Legislative Assembly of Alberta for Calgary-Foothills
- In office November 22, 2004 – September 29, 2014
- Preceded by: Pat Nelson
- Succeeded by: Jim Prentice

Personal details
- Born: Leonard Warren Webber; November 10, 1960 (age 65) Calgary, Alberta, Canada
- Party: Progressive Conservative (2004–2014); Independent (2014); Conservative (2014–present)
- Spouse: Heather Macdonald (m. 1987; died 2010)
- Children: Lauren, Jaime, Kelly
- Education: University of Calgary; Southern Alberta Institute of Technology

Leonard Warren Webber (born November 10, 1960) is a Canadian politician who most recently served as the Member of Parliament for the riding of Calgary Confederation from 2015 until 2025 as a member of the Conservative Party of Canada. During the 43rd Canadian Parliament his private member bill An Act to amend the Canada Revenue Agency Act (organ and tissue donors) (Bill C-210) was adopted to allow Canadians to indicate their intent to sign up as a donor through their annual income tax return. Previously, he was a Conservative Member of the Legislative Assembly of Alberta, representing the constituency of Calgary-Foothills from 2004 to 2014, serving cabinet portfolios of Minister of International & Intergovernmental Affairs and Minister of Aboriginal Relations.

== Early life ==
Webber was born November 10, 1960, in Calgary, Alberta. His father, Dr. Neil Webber, served as the Member of the Legislative Assembly for the constituency of Calgary-Bow from 1975 until 1989 and was also a member of cabinet. (Len) Webber graduated from the University of Calgary with a Bachelor of Commerce degree and went on to acquire his Journeyman Communications Electrician certificate from the Southern Alberta Institute of Technology (SAIT). He then pursued work as an apprentice electrician and managed his own contracting company for 10 years. Prior to seeking office, Webber served as vice president and director of the Webber Academy, a private University preparatory school in southwest Calgary founded by Len's father, Neil.

== Political career ==
Webber first sought public office in the 2004 provincial election in the constituency of Calgary-Foothills. In that election, he received 57% of the vote. In addition to his responsibilities as MLA during his first term, Webber held the position of Deputy Government Whip and was chair of the Advisory Committee on Climate Change, the MLA Review Committee of Private Investigators and Security Guards Act, the Healthy Aging and Continuing Care in Alberta Committee, and the MLA Task Force on Affordable Housing and Homelessness in Alberta. He also acted as co-chair of the MLA Task Force on Continuing Care Health Service and Accommodation Standards Committee and served as a member of numerous other committees and boards.

In the 2008 provincial election, Webber was reelected as MLA for Calgary-Foothills with 48% of the vote. He serves as a member of the Board of Directors for the Calgary Stampede, the Calgary Homeless Foundation, and WorldSkills Calgary 2009. Webber was re-elected in 2012, and in March 2014 left the Progressive Conservative caucus to sit as an independent in protest against the leadership of Alison Redford.

Webber resigned his seat in the legislature on September 29, 2014, one day after winning the federal Conservative Party of Canada nomination for the newly created urban riding of Calgary Confederation. He was elected in the 2015 federal election, to be the Member of Parliament for Calgary Confederation, though his party formed the official opposition. During the 42nd Canadian Parliament he introduced one private member bill which passed the House of Commons but died in the senate. He was re-elected in the 2019 federal election. During the 43rd Canadian Parliament Webber re-introduced his private member bill An Act to amend the Canada Revenue Agency Act (organ and tissue donors) (Bill C-210), adopted in June 2021 with all party support, to allow Canadians to indicate their intent to sign up as a donor through their annual income tax return.

In April 2023, Webber submitted a petition to address abuse in long term care facilities.

Before being elected to the House of Commons, Webber served three terms as a Member of the Legislative Assembly of Alberta for the constituency of Calgary-Foothills and served in the cabinet portfolios of Minister of International & Intergovernmental Affairs and Minister of Aboriginal Relations.

On March 22, 2025, Webber announced that he would not run for re-election in the 2025 federal election.

== Controversy ==
In February 2020, Webber faced criticism for accepting a $324,000 transition allowance when moving from a provincial MLA role to a federal MP role. The allowance, intended to ease exiting a political career, was part of Alberta's policy for politicians at the time. Since Webber resigned his seat in the legislature the day after he won the federal Conservative Party of Canada nomination, some criticized the appropriateness of him accepting the transition payment, since he was transitioning only to a higher level of politics.

== Personal life ==
Webber has three daughters. His wife is deceased. Webber has been involved with Hospice Calgary, the MS Society, the Calgary Foundation, and the Alberta Alcohol and Drug Abuse Commission (AADAC). He is an advocate for events surrounding breast cancer awareness and research. Webber is a recipient of the Alberta Centennial Medal and the Queen Elizabeth II Diamond Jubilee Medal for his many philanthropic contributions.

== Electoral record ==
=== Federal ===
2021 Canadian federal election: Calgary Confederation
| Party | Candidate | Votes | % | ±% | Expenditures |
|---|---|---|---|---|---|
| Conservative | Len Webber | 28,367 | 46.03 | –9.08 | $67,252.27 |
| Liberal | Murray Sigler | 17,560 | 28.49 | +5.87 | $72,571.56 |
| New Democratic | Gulshan Akter | 10,561 | 17.14 | +6.04 | $4,394.78 |
| People's | Edward Gao | 2,670 | 4.33 | +2.61 | $2,377.79 |
| Green | Natalie Odd | 2,295 | 3.72 | –4.93 | $16,335.22 |
| Marxist–Leninist | Kevan Hunter | 178 | 0.29 | +0.11 | none listed |
| Total valid votes/expense limit | | 61,631 | 99.40 | – | $119,393.54 |
| Total rejected ballots | | 369 | 0.60 | –0.02 | |
| Turnout | | 62,000 | 67.40 | –3.77 | |
| Eligible voters | | 91,983 | | | |
| Conservative hold | | Swing | | –7.48 | |
Source: Elections Canada

2019 Canadian federal election: Calgary Confederation
| Party | Candidate | Votes | % | ±% | Expenditures |
|---|---|---|---|---|---|
| Conservative | Len Webber | 36,312 | 55.11 | +9.20 | $76,635.02 |
| Liberal | Jordan Stein | 14,908 | 22.62 | –20.91 | $74,229.77 |
| New Democratic | Gurcharan Singh Sidhu | 7,312 | 11.10 | +3.96 | $1,171.80 |
| Green | Natalie Odd | 5,700 | 8.65 | +5.44 | $27,621.83 |
| People's | Colin Korol | 1,136 | 1.72 | – | none listed |
| Libertarian | Tim Moen | 407 | 0.62 | – | none listed |
| Marxist–Leninist | Kevan Hunter | 117 | 0.18 | –0.03 | none listed |
| Total valid votes/expense limit | | 65,892 | 99.38 | – | $116,669.75 |
| Total rejected ballots | | 410 | 0.62 | +0.30 | |
| Turnout | | 66,302 | 71.17 | –2.43 | |
| Eligible voters | | 93,160 | | | |
| Conservative hold | | Swing | | +15.06 | |
Source: Elections Canada

2015 Canadian federal election: Calgary Confederation
| Party | Candidate | Votes | % | ±% | Expenditures |
|---|---|---|---|---|---|
| Conservative | Len Webber | 30,669 | 45.91 | –6.52 | $153,636.85 |
| Liberal | Matt Grant | 29,083 | 43.53 | +25.89 | $159,579.52 |
| New Democratic | Kirk Heuser | 4,770 | 7.14 | –8.69 | $60,522.97 |
| Green | Natalie Odd | 2,146 | 3.21 | –10.49 | $21,308.54 |
| Marxist–Leninist | Kevan Hunter | 140 | 0.21 | –0.19 | none listed |
| Total valid votes/expense limit | | 66,808 | 99.68 | – | $228,532.64 |
| Total rejected ballots | | 216 | 0.32 | – | |
| Turnout | | 67,024 | 73.60 | – | |
| Eligible voters | | 91,061 | | | |
| Conservative hold | | Swing | | –16.21 | |
Source: Elections Canada

=== Provincial: Calgary-Foothills (electoral district) ===
2012 Alberta general election
| Party | Candidate | Votes | % |
|---|---|---|---|
| Progressive Conservative | Len Webber | 8,251 | 53.65 |
| Wildrose | Dustin Nau | 5,135 | 33.39 |
| Liberal | Kurt Hansen | 1,414 | 9.19 |
| New Democratic | Jenn Carkner | 578 | 3.76 |
| Total | | 15,378 | |

| 2008 Alberta general election results | | Turnout 35.24% | | Swing | |
| Affiliation | Candidate | Votes | % | Party | Personal |
| Progressive Conservative | Len Webber | 6,088 | 48.20% | −8.57% | |
| Liberal | Mike Robinson | 4,909 | 38.86% | 4.12% | |
| Wildrose Alliance | Kevin Legare | 972 | 7.70% | 3.09% | |
| Green | Ian Groll | 411 | 3.25% | * | |
| New Democratic | Stephanie Sundberg | 251 | 1.99% | −1.89% | |
| Total | | 12,631 | | | |
| Rejected, spoiled and declined | | 61 | | | |
| Eligible electors / Turnout | | 36,019 | % | | |
| Progressive Conservative hold | | Swing | | −6.35% | |

| 2004 Alberta general election results | | Turnout 37.13% | | Swing | |
| Affiliation | Candidate | Votes | % | Party | Personal |
| Progressive Conservative | Len Webber | 5,819 | 56.77% | −10.64% | |
| Liberal | Stephen Jenuth | 3,561 | 34.74% | 6.53% | |
| Alberta Alliance | Vincent Jansen van Doorn | 472 | 4.61% | | |
| New Democratic | Malcolm Forster | 398 | 3.88% | -0.50% | |
| Total | | 10,250 | | | |
| Rejected, spoiled and declined | | 50 | | | |
| Eligible electors / Turnout | | 27,739 | % | | |
| Progressive Conservative hold | | Swing | | −8.59% | |
