= King Edward Hotel (Calgary) =

Building in Alberta, Canada

Coordinates: 51.044423°N 114.053503°W

King Edward (Eddy) Hotel
- King Edward Hotel
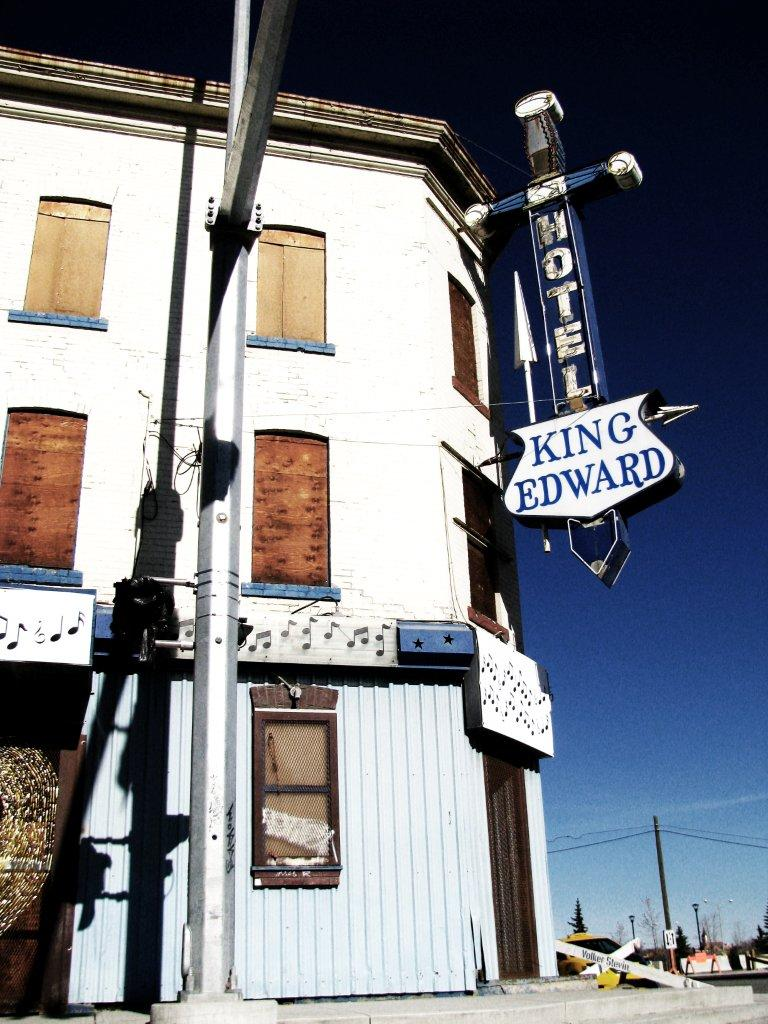
- The King Edward Hotel prior to its reconstruction
- Interactive map of King Edward (Eddy) Hotel
- Address: 438 9th Ave SE, Calgary, Alberta; Canada
- Owner: Cantos Music Foundation (2008)
- Type: Hotel, Blues bar
- Current use: National Music Center

Construction
- Built: 1905–1910

Website
- https://kingeddy.ca/

The King Edward Hotel (also known as the "King Eddy") is a former hotel in Calgary, Alberta. After being abandoned, it was incorporated into the Downtown East Village revitalization project. It was disassembled and rebuilt as part of the Studio Bell National Music Centre project. The club is known as "King Eddy".

== History ==
The King Edward Hotel was built in phases between 1905 and 1910 on 9th Avenue Southeast. It housed one of Calgary's oldest bars.

It closed its doors in 2004.

In 2012, the inside and outside of the building were scanned for historical preservation, and to assist in the design of the National Music Centre. A subset of the exterior scan can be viewed as the building existed before being dismantled in 2013.

=== Incorporation in National Music Centre ===
In May 2008, the National Music Centre was selected through a competitive process to work with Calgary Municipal Land Corporation on the King Eddy rejuvenation project.

In October 2013, crews started the tedious task of taking the century-old hotel apart brick-by-brick. The bricks were wrapped and stored on pallets inside a shipping container to preserve them while crews worked to reassemble the structure. Even the hotel's front door step was saved to be used again.

The CA$168,000,000 (equivalent to $214,841,121 in 2025) National Music Centre, including the rebuilt King Edward Hotel building, opened in 2016. The National Music Centre includes performance spaces, recording studios, broadcasting facilities and an extensive collection of artifacts including the Canada Music Hall of Fame and the Canadian Country Music Hall of Fame.

=== Re-opening as live venue ===
In 2018, the King Edwared Hotel reopened as a permanent live music venue.

== See also ==
- Royal eponyms in Canada
- National Music Centre
- Heritage conservation in Canada
- Adaptive reuse
