= Nelson Mandela High School =

Nelson Mandela High School may refer to:

- Nelson Mandela High School, Sierra Leone, in Waterloo, Sierra Leone
- Nelson Mandela High School, Canada in Calgary, Alberta, Canada

== See also ==
- Nelson Mandela School (disambiguation)
- Lycée Nelson Mandela
