= 2012 in rail transport =

This article lists events related to rail transport that occurred in 2012.

== Events ==
=== January ===
- (China) 9 January – Shenyang Metro Line 2 opened.
- 14 January – The Marina Bay Extension of the Circle MRT line in Singapore opens for service.

=== February ===
- (United Kingdom) 4 February – National Express East Anglia's passenger service franchise expires; from the following day services are taken over by Abellio Greater Anglia.
- (Argentina) 22 February – Buenos Aires rail disaster: A buffer stop collision at Once railway station kills 51.

=== March ===
- 3 March – Szczekociny rail crash: A head-on collision in Poland kills 16.
- (United States) 25 March – The North Shore Connector extension of the Pittsburgh Light Rail system opens.

=== April ===
- 1 April
  - (Japan) The Towada Kankō Electric Railway Line is abolished, ending 89 years of service between Misawa and Towadashi Stations in Aomori Prefecture.
  - (Japan) The Yashiro Line on the Nagano Electric Railway is abolished in Nagano Prefecture after 89 years of operation.
- (United States) 13 April – The Metropolitan Transportation Commission grants the Downtown San Francisco Extension top priority for federal funding. This would extend the Caltrain line 1.3 miles (2.1 km) from the current terminus at 4th & King (close to AT&T Park) to Downtown San Francisco's Transbay Transit Center and be used by California High-Speed Rail as its terminal. As of 2023 the extension is scheduled for completion in 2032.
- (United States) 23 April – Boston's MBTA Commuter Rail Providence/Stoughton Line extension to Wickford Junction station opens.
- 28 April
  - (Italy) – Open-access operator Nuovo Trasporto Viaggiatori begins operation of its .italo high-speed trains.
  - (United States) – The first phase of Los Angeles County Metropolitan Transportation Authority Expo Line opens for service. The line runs from downtown LA to Culver City. The next phase of the project will extend the line to Santa Monica.
  - (China) – Suzhou Metro opens.
- (United States) 30 April – Oakton–Skokie station station on the Chicago Transit Authority's Yellow Line opens.

=== May ===
- (Estonia) (Russia) 27 May – GoRail starts operating on Tallinn–Saint Petersburg line after a four-year hiatus.

=== June ===
- (United Kingdom) 13 June – The Manchester Metrolink light rail system opens the first phase of its Oldham & Rochdale Line over the former Oldham Loop Line to a temporary terminus at Oldham Mumps.
- (United States) 15 June – The SacRT light rail Green Line Phase 1 to River District opens. A future extension is planned to extend this line to the Sacramento International Airport but is not expected to be completed until sometime during the 2020s.
- (China) 28 June – Kunming Metro opens.

=== July ===
- (China) 1 July – Tianjin Metro Line 2 opens.
- (United States) 28 July – Construction was completed and service commencing on the AirportLink line (now called the Orange Line) of the Miami Metrorail, extending service to Miami International Airport via the Miami Intermodal Center.

=== August ===
- (Canada) 27 August – Construction is completed on the north east extension of Calgary's light rail transit system, the C-Train. The extension has added 2 new stations in northeast Calgary at Martindale and Saddletowne, adding several kilometers of track to the system.
- (Bulgaria) 31 August – Sofia Metro Line 2 begins service.

=== September ===
- (China) 16 September – Chengdu Metro Line 2 opens.
- (United States) 22 September – The 2001-opened Portland Streetcar system, in Portland, Oregon, inaugurates service on a second line, the "Central Loop" (or CL Line), serving the central east side. This line is now known as the A and B Loop.
- (China) 28 September – Phase 1 of Chongqing Rail Transit's Line 6, connecting Wulidian to Kangzhuang, opens.

=== October ===
- 1 October
  - (China) Tianjin Metro Line 3 opens.
  - (Montenegro) The Nikšić–Podgorica railway reopens to passengers after reconstruction and electrification.
- (United Kingdom) 3 October – The UK Department for Transport announces cancellation and rerunning of the InterCity West Coast passenger service franchise bidding process after discovering significant technical flaws in its assessment, reversing an August decision to award it to FirstGroup and following challenges by incumbent operator Virgin Trains.
- (United States) 8 October – Seattle's Sounder commuter rail south line extension to South Tacoma and Lakewood opens.
- (South Korea) 27 October – In Seoul, Line 7 of the Seoul Metropolitan Subway is extended from Onsu to Bupyeong-gu Office (10.3 km (6.4 mi)).
- (Tanzania) 29 October – Dar es Salaam commuter rail service commences.

=== November ===
- (China) 24 November – Hangzhou Metro Line 3 opens.

=== December ===
- (China) 1 December – The Harbin–Dalian High-Speed Railway opens for service.
- (United States) 3 December – Dallas Area Rapid Transit opens extensions on two lines: the Orange Line carrying passengers to Belt Line, and the Blue Line extension to the Downtown Rowlett station.
- 10 December
  - (Canada) – Opening of West Line of the Calgary C-Train, the first new segment of the system in 25 years. Martindale and Saddletowne stations are added to the system.
  - (United States) – Utah Transit Authority's FrontRunner extends service south from Salt Lake City to Provo.
- (France) 15 December – Automation of Paris Métro Line 1 reaches 100%. This is the second automated line after Line 14.
- (United Kingdom) 16 December – The Manchester Metrolink light rail system extends its Oldham & Rochdale Line to Shaw & Crompton.
- (France) 18 December – Paris Métro Line 12 is extended from Porte de la Chapelle to Front Populaire.
- 21 December – Inauguration of the reopened Nigerian Railway Corporation's Lagos–Kano railway line in Nigeria, rebuilt by China Civil Engineering Construction Corporation and Costain West Africa.
- (China) 26 December – The Beijing-Zhengzhou section of the Beijing–Guangzhou–Shenzhen–Hong Kong High-Speed Railway is scheduled to open, completing the HSR connection from Beijing to Guangzhou and Shenzhen.

== Deaths ==
- 18 March – Alan Pegler, British railway preservationist, dies (b. 1920).
- 22 July – Ding Guangen, Minister of Railways for China 1985–1988, dies (b. 1929).
- 5 August – Benjamin W. Heineman, president of Chicago and North Western Railway 1956–1972, dies (b. 1914).
- 4 October – Bernard Holden, president of Bluebell Railway, dies (b. 1908).

== Industry awards ==
=== Japan ===
Awards presented by the Japan Railfan Club

- 2012 Blue Ribbon Award: JR East E5 Series Shinkansen EMU
- 2012 Laurel Prize: JR Freight Class HD300-900 hybrid locomotive

== See also ==
- List of rail accidents (2010–2019)
