= Saddletowne station =

Light rail station in Calgary, Alberta, Canada

Saddletowne
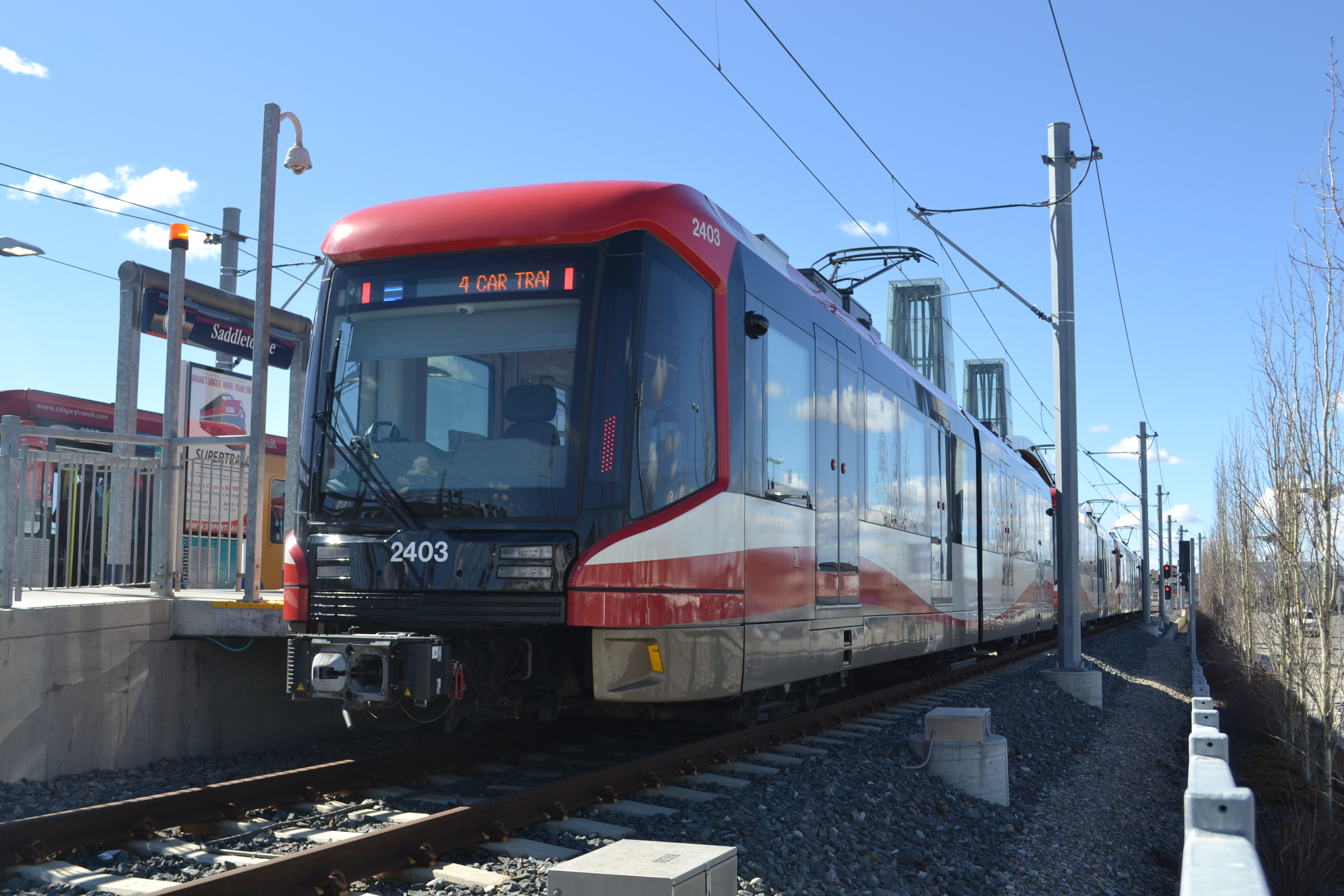
- A train at Saddletowne in May 2017

General information
- Coordinates: 51°07′32″N 113°56′53″W
- Owner: Calgary Transit
- Platforms: Center-loading platform
- Connections: 23 52 Street East; 38 North Crosstown; 59 Savanna; 60 Martindale; 61 Taradale; 70 Temple; 80 Homestead; 100 Airport/North Pointe; 119 Freeport; 128 Cornerstone/Redstone; 136 Corner Meadows/Cornerbrook; 145 Skyview Ranch/Cityscape; 157 Stoney Industrial/North Pointe; 159 Saddlebrook; MAX Orange Brentwood

Construction
- Structure type: At-grade
- Parking: 141 spaces
- Accessible: yes

History
- Opened: 2012; 14 years ago

Services
Preceding station	Calgary Transit	Following station
Martindale toward 69 Street	Blue Line	Terminus
Location

Saddletowne Station is a CTrain light rail station on the Northeast leg of the Blue Line located in Saddle Ridge, Calgary, Alberta. Opened on August 27, 2012, as part of a 2.9-km extension.

It is the current terminus of the N.E. line and is located in the northwest corner of Saddletowne Circle N.E., a large roundabout where the Saddleridge Town Centre a commercial and activity centre, with planned medium-density residential development and community facilities. The station has a Park and Ride with a 141-stall capacity.

The station is a center-loading, walk-on island platform.

Construction on the extension started in the spring of 2010 and completed, for its grand opening block party, on August 25, 2012. The extension was delayed by almost one year, as it was initially planned to open in late 2011.

In its first year of service, Saddletowne served an average of 8,730 boardings per day.

The 100 bus rapid transit route arrives at the station, providing a transit connection to Calgary International Airport.

== Station upgrades ==
Calgary Transit, in collaboration with Shaw Communications, announced on November 16, 2016 that 8 new locations for Public Wi-Fi services would be added to the Calgary C-Train system. These new locations would add public Wi-Fi to 18 new stations; including Saddletowne Station. These changes ere done as they would improve transit experience for their users, which would improve customer commitment.

== Around the station ==
=== Major destinations ===
- YMCA Genesis Centre / Saddletowne YMCA
- Nelson Mandela High School
- Saddletowne Crossing (Shopping Plaza)

=== Communities ===
Residential

- Martindale
- Saddle Ridge
  - Savanna (major sub-community of Saddle Ridge)
- Taradale
  - Saddletowne (major sub-community of Taradale, and from where the station derives its name)

== Transit connections ==
Bus connections as of 31 August, 2026:

- 23 - 52 Street E/Seton (South)
- 38 - North Crosstown Brentwood (West)
- 59 - Savanna (Clockwise)
- 60 - Martindale (South)
- 61 - Taradale (South)
- 70 - Temple/Whitehorn (South)
- 80 - Homestead (East)
- 100 - Airport/North Pointe (West)
- 119 - Freeport (Counterclockwise AM) / 119 - Freeport (Clockwise PM)
- 128 - Cornerstone/Redstone (Counterclockwise)
- 136 - Corner Meadows/Cornerbrook (Clockwise)
- 145 - Skyview Ranch/Redstone (Clockwise)
- 157 - Stoney/North Pointe (West)
- 159 - Saddlebrook (Counterclockwise)
- - MAX Orange (Brentwood)

== Accidents and incidents ==
On October 15, 2026, a collision between two Calgary Transit buses resulted in the explosion of a compressed natural gas tank that killed three people.
