= Merchant Taylors =

Merchant Taylors may refer to:

- Merchant Taylors' School, Northwood (Hertfordshire)
- Merchant Taylors' Prep School (Hertfordshire)
- Merchant Taylors' Boys' School, Crosby (Merseyside)
- Merchant Taylors' Girls' School, Crosby

== See also ==
- Worshipful Company of Merchant Taylors
