= Taradale =

Taradale may refer to:

- Taradale, Calgary, Canada
- Taradale, New Zealand
- Taradale, Victoria, Australia
