= Nelson Mandela School =

Nelson Mandela School may refer to

- Nelson Mandela School, Berlin, Germany
- Nelson Mandela Primary School, a school in Birmingham, United Kingdom
- Nelson Mandela University, university in Port Elizabeth, South Africa (formerly Nelson Mandela Metropolitan University)
- Nelson Mandela Academic Hospital, a teaching hospital in Mthatha, South Africa
- Nelson Mandela High School, Sierra Leone, in Waterloo, Sierra Leone
- Nelson Mandela African Institute of Science and Technology, university in Arusha, Tanzania
- Nelson Mandela High School, Canada, in Calgary, Alberta, Canada

== See also ==
- Nelson Mandela (disambiguation)
