= Nelson Mandela (disambiguation) =

Nelson Mandela (1918–2013) was the first post-apartheid president of South Africa.

Nelson Mandela may also refer to:

== Venues ==
- Nelson Mandela Stadium, Algeria
- Nelson Mandela Bay Stadium, South Africa
- Nelson Mandela Forum, Italy

== Other uses ==
- Nelson Mandela: A Biography, a 1999 book by Martin Meredith
- Nelson Mandela (EP), a 2013 EP by Zahara, or the title song
- "Free Nelson Mandela" or "Nelson Mandela", a 1984 protest song by The Specials / The Special AKA
- Statue of Nelson Mandela (Washington, D.C.), a sculpture by Jean Doyle

== See also ==
- Mandela (disambiguation)
- Nelson Mandela Children's Fund
- Nelson Mandela Institution
- Nelson Mandela School (disambiguation)
- UniSA Nelson Mandela Lecture
