= Martindale, Calgary =

Martindale
- Neighbourhood
- Location of Martindale in Calgary
- Coordinates: 51°07′04″N 113°57′33″W
- Country: Canada
- Province: Alberta
- City: Calgary
- Quadrant: NE
- Ward: 5
- Established: 1983
- Annexed: 1961

Government
  - Mayor: Jeromy Farkas
  - Administrative body: Calgary City Council
  - Councillor: Raj Dhaliwal (Independent)

Area
  - Total: 2.7 km^{2} (1.0 sq mi)
- Elevation: 1,095 m (3,593 ft)

Population (2011)
  - Total: 12,987
  - Average Income: $65,185
- Website: Martindale Community Association

Martindale is a residential neighbourhood in the northeast quadrant of Calgary, Alberta. It is bounded to the north by 80 Avenue NE, to the east by Falconridge Boulevard, to the south by 64 Avenue NE and to the west by Métis Trail. The Martindale LRT station opened in August 2012.

The area was annexed to the City of Calgary in 1961 and Martindale was established in 1983. It is represented in the Calgary City Council by the Ward 5 councillor. Martindale is reportedly named after one of the community's developers children: Martin and Tara.

== Demographics ==
In the City of Calgary's 2012 municipal census, Martindale had a population of 13,674 living in 3,912 dwellings, a 5.3% increase from its 2011 population of 12,987. With a land area of 2.7 km^{2} (1.0 sq mi), it had a population density of 5,060/km^{2} (13,120/sq mi) in 2012.

Residents in this community had a median household income of $97,000 in as of 2020, and there were 18.1% low income residents living in the neighbourhood. As of 2006, 39.4% of the residents were immigrants and as of 2021 that percentage has increased to 55%. A proportion of 3.0% of the buildings were condominiums or apartments, and 12.6% of the housing was used for renting.

== Crime ==
In the May 2023-May 2024 data period, Martindale had a crime rate of 1.808/100, a decrease from the previous data period.

This puts it at this comparison to other Calgary communities: Saddle Ridge (1.358/100), Whitehorn (1.741/100), Martindale (1.808/100), Rundle (2.342/100), Brentwood (2.348/100), Acadia (2.542/100), Bowness (2.934/100), Shawnessy (3.296/100), Inglewood (3.438/100), Sunnyside (3.650/100), Marlborough (4.703/100), Southwood (5.147/100), Sunalta (5.307/100), Montgomery (5.483/100), Forest Lawn (6.528/100), Rosscarrock (7.049/100), Downtown Commercial Core (12.705/100), Downtown East Village (15.605/100), Manchester (43.368/100).

=== Crime data by year ===
Crime Data
Year	Crime Rate (/100)
2018	2.2
2019	2.2
2020	2.1
2021	1.7
2022	1.8
2023	2.0

== Education ==
The community is served a number of schools, including Crossing Park School, Manmeet Singh Bhullar School, Nelson Mandela High School, École La Mosaïque (francophone K-6).

== See also ==
- List of neighbourhoods in Calgary
