= Saddle Ridge, Calgary =

Saddle Ridge
- Neighbourhood
- Location of Saddle Ridge in Calgary
- Coordinates: 51°07′48″N 113°57′09″W
- Country: Canada
- Province: Alberta
- City: Calgary
- Quadrant: NE
- Ward: 5
- Established: 1960

Government
  - Mayor: Jeromy Farkas
  - Administrative body: Calgary City Council
  - Councillor: Raj Dhaliwal (Independent)
- Elevation: 1,095 m (3,593 ft)

Population (2021)
  - Total: 24,365
  - Average Income: $104,000
- Website: Saddle Ridge Community Association

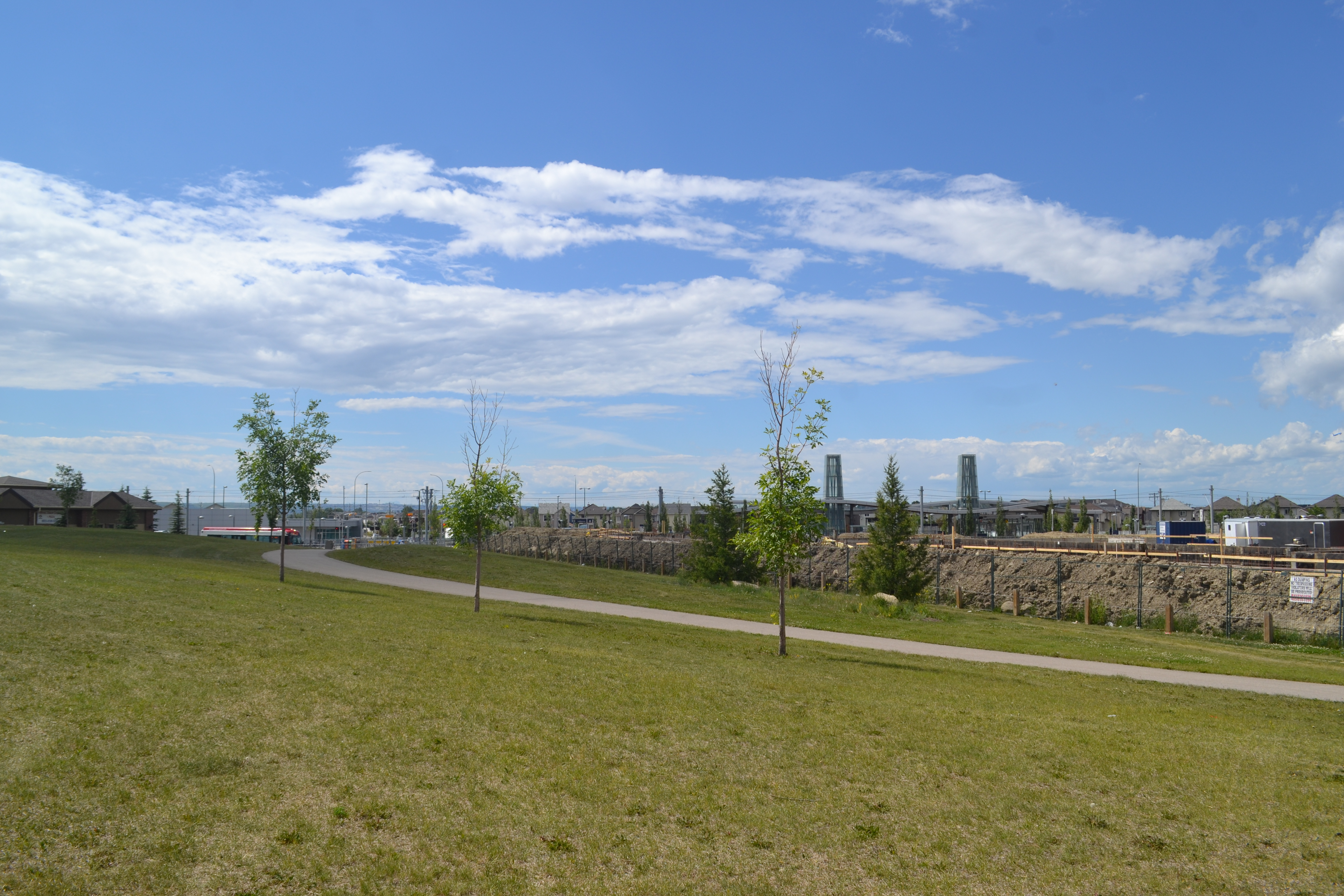
A view of Saddle Ridge

Saddle Ridge is a residential neighbourhood in the northeast quadrant of Calgary, Alberta. It is located at the northeastern edge of the city, and it is bounded to the north by Airport Trail NE, to the east by Stoney Trail NE (Highway 201), to the south by 80 Avenue NE and to the west by Métis Trail. The Saddle Ridge Industrial Area and Calgary International Airport are located west of the neighbourhood.

The Saddletowne CTrain was built in 2012, and is the end of line for Northeast. The CTrain station is located across a plaza that serves many South Asian restaurants as well as Nelson Mandela High School, and YMCA. Saddle Ridge is the largest neighbourhood for its Indian, Pakistani, Punjabi, and small Bengali community. The Bilal Islamic Centre opened up in 2021, and has attracted many Muslims in the Northeast.

The community initially consisted of acreages, with an active community association since the 1970s; intended urbanization was supposed to begin in the 1990s, however, due to drainage, it was pushed to the 2000s. In the mid-2000s, urbanization of the region began and, today, Saddle Ridge primarily refers to the urban community that has developed around the commercial hub formed by Saddletowne Circle, although a number of acreages remain. The western portion of the area is called Saddle Ridge Industrial and started its construction in late 2018. Savanna, a division of the neighbourhood, houses a lot of the Saddle Ridge population.

It is represented in the Calgary City Council by the Ward 5 councillor.

== Demographics ==
In the City of Calgary's 2021 municipal census, Saddle Ridge had a population of 24,365 living in 6,005 dwellings With a land area of 5.5 km^{2} (2.1 sq mi), it had a population density of 4,430/km^{2} (11,470/sq mi) in 2021.

Residents in Saddle Ridge had a median household income of $104,000 in 2021, and 8% of residents in Saddle Ridge were low-income. As of 2021, 62% of the residents were immigrants, a proportion of 22% of housing was apartments, and 23% of the housing was used for renting. 27% of Saddle Ridge residents spent 30%+ of their income on housing, compared to the Calgary average of 23%.

== Crime ==
In the May 2023-May 2024 data period, Saddle Ridge had a crime rate of 1.358/100, a decrease from the previous data period.

This puts it at this comparison to other Calgary communities: Saddle Ridge (1.358/100), Whitehorn (1.741/100), Rundle (2.342/100), Brentwood (2.348/100), Acadia (2.542/100), Bowness (2.934/100), Shawnessy (3.296/100), Inglewood (3.438/100), Sunnyside (3.650/100), Marlborough (4.703/100), Southwood (5.147/100), Sunalta (5.307/100), Montgomery (5.483/100), Forest Lawn (6.528/100), Rosscarrock (7.049/100), Downtown Commercial Core (12.705/100), Downtown East Village (15.605/100), Manchester (43.368/100).

=== Crime data by year ===
Crime Data
Year	Crime Rate (/100)
2018	1.3
2019	1.5
2020	1.4
2021	1.3
2022	1.2
2023	1.3

== Education ==
Saddle Ridge Elementary School serves students, the school accommodates Kindergarten to Grade 4 students residing in Saddle Ridge, alongside Saddle Ridge Elementary school and Hugh A. Bennett School. Peter Lougheed Junior High School which opened in 2016 in Saddle Ridge. Students who've competed Kindergarten - Grade 4 are later welcomed to Peter Lougheed. Welcoming students from Grade 5 - Grade 9, Nelson Mandela the high school of students who live in the community of Saddle Ridge.

The Calgary Catholic School Board houses one school, Light of Christ, in the Saddleridge area, it was the first school to open in the community. It is located in Saddlehorn and welcomes those from Kindergarten to Grade 9.

== See also ==
- List of neighbourhoods in Calgary
