= Calgary International Airport =

Major airport in Alberta, Canada

YYC Calgary Airport

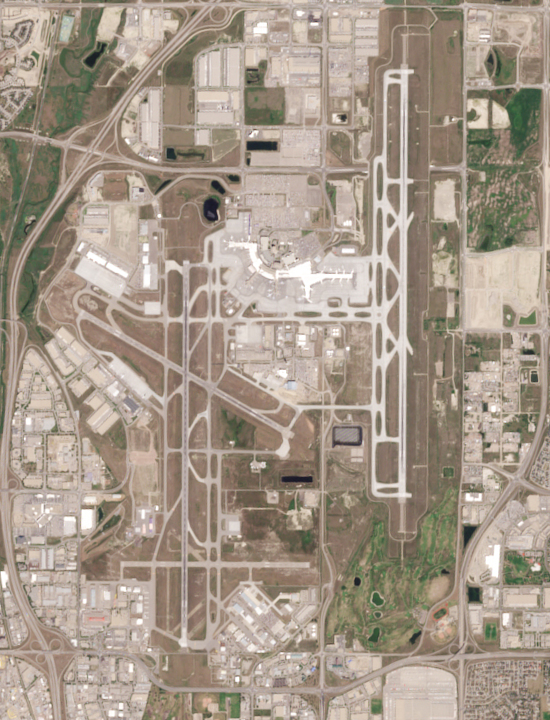
- Satellite view of the airport in 2018
- IATA: YYC; ICAO: CYYC; WMO: 71877

Summary
- Airport type: Public
- Owner: Transport Canada
- Operator: Calgary Airport Authority
- Opened: 1938; 88 years ago
- Hub for: WestJet
- Focus city for: Air Canada; Air North
- Operating base for: Central Mountain Air; Flair Airlines
- Time zone: Alberta Time (UTC−06:00)
- Elevation AMSL: 3,606 ft (1,099 m)
- Coordinates: 51°06′50″N 114°01′13″W
- Public transit access: Calgary Transit 300 100
- Website: www.yyc.com

Map
- Interactive map of YYC Calgary Airport

Runways
Direction	Length		Surface
Direction	ft	m	Surface
11/29	8,000	2,438	Asphalt
17R/35L	12,675	3,863	Asphalt
17L/35R	14,000	4,267	Concrete

Statistics (2025)
- Passengers: 19,409,550
- Aircraft movements: 205,086
- Sources: Canada Flight Supplement; AIP Canada Supplement; Environment Canada; Passenger traffic from Calgary Airport Authority; Aircraft movements from Statistics Canada

Calgary International Airport (IATA: YYC, ICAO: CYYC), branded as YYC Calgary Airport, is an international airport that serves the city of Calgary, Alberta, Canada. It is located approximately 17 kilometres (11 mi) northeast of downtown Calgary and covers an area of 20.82 square kilometres (8.04 square miles; 5,140 acres; 2,082 hectares). With 19.4 million passengers and 205,086 aircraft movements in 2025, Calgary International is the busiest airport in Alberta and the fourth-busiest in Canada by both passenger traffic and aircraft movements. This airport is operated by the Calgary Airport Authority, and is served by the Calgary International Airport Emergency Response Service for aircraft rescue and firefighting protection.

Built in the late 1930s, the site has three runways, two terminal buildings with six concourses for international and domestic passengers, and dedicated cargo handling facilities. The airport is one of nine Canadian airports that contain U.S border preclearance facilities. The Calgary Airport Authority operates the property while paying rent to Transport Canada. Close to the airport are the Deerfoot Trail and Stoney Trail freeways for transport into the city and surrounding area, and public transit also serves the airport.

The region's petroleum and tourism industries (including proximity to Banff National Park) have helped foster growth at the airport, which has nonstop flights to destinations in North America, South America, Europe, and Asia. Calgary International Airport serves as the headquarters and primary global hub for WestJet, and a focus city for Air Canada and Air North. The airport serves as an operating base for Central Mountain Air, and Flair Airlines.

== History ==
=== Early history ===
The first airport to serve Calgary opened in 1914, in the then-town of Bowness. It occupied one-square kilometre (0.39 sq mi) and consisted of a hut and a grass runway. The site is now the location of a community centre (The Landing) as well as Bowness High School and Bowglen Park.

Operations shifted to a new airport southwest of the city in 1928, named Old Banff Coach Road Airport (51°02′55.7″N 114°09′09.8″W). However, issues with turbulence in the area prompted another airfield to be built the following year in the neighbourhood of Renfrew known as the Calgary Municipal Airport or Stanley Jones Airport. The local airline Renfew Air Service constructed the Rutledge Hangar at the Renfrew site (6th Street and Regal Crescent) in 1929, a lamella arch structure composed of Douglas Fir planks on a reinforced concrete base. The Renfew Air Service folded in November 1931 as a result of the Great Depression, and ownership of the Rutledge Hangar was taken over by the Edmonton Credit Corporation who subsequently lease the hangar to the City of Calgary. The RCAF used the airport in the 1940s. The Rutledge Hangar remains standing at the original Renfew site by Boys and Girls Club of Calgary and was designated an Alberta Provincial Historic Resource on 5 May 2003.

=== Present site and World War II ===
As the City of Calgary grew to surround the Renfrew airport site the municipal government decided to relocate the airport to a new location. The city purchased an area of land north of Calgary in 1938 for about $31,000; and remains the site of Calgary's current airport. The city came to an agreement with Trans-Canada Air Lines to construct and lease a hangar on the site for $45,000 (equivalent to $959,610 in 2025), and the federal Department of Transportation financed the construction of three runways and other improvements, the first of which opened on 25 September. The new Calgary airfield was named McCall Field after First World War ace and lifelong Calgarian Fred McCall.

As a result of Canada entering the Second World War, the federal government assumed control of McCall Field in 1940, re-purposing it as a fuel and maintenance stop for aircraft involved in the war effort and later stationing the No. 37 Service Flying Training School at the airfield from 22 October 1941 until its closure on 10 March 1944. McCall Field continued to operate regular passenger flights during the Second World War.

Following the end of the Second World War, the airport had been expanded to include additional hangars, four runways and other infrastructure. The City of Calgary resumed management of McCall Field in 1946, repurposed the a hangar as a passenger terminal, and convinced the federal government to extend the airports 4,125 ft (1,257 m) east–west runway to 6,200 feet (1,900 m) in October 1949 at an estimated cost of $750,000 the construction required a 5 foot (1.5 m) excavation below grade to prevent frost heaving. At the time of completion, McCall Field's east–west runway was the third-longest runway in Alberta behind the Calgary Airport's north–south runway and the runway at CFB Namao.

=== 1950s and 1960s: Terminal expansion and jet age ===
The re-purposed military hangars did not meet the growing transportation needs of the city, and efforts were made by city officials to secure funding for a new passenger terminal. A new passenger terminal was constructed in 1956; its design originated in the 1950s as a thesis project by Provincial Institute of Technology and Art architecture student Ken Bond, who later formed the architectural firm Clayton, Bond and Mogridge, which was awarded the contract for designing the new terminal. The one-million dollar project featured an open public concourse, and ticketing offices for three airlines was dubbed one of the most modern air terminals in Canada when it opened on 2 June 1956. A lavish opening ceremony was attended by federal Transportation Minister George C. Marler, Lieutenant Governor of Alberta John J. Bowlen, and Mayor Donald Hugh Mackay, and a number of other dignitaries. The festivities included an air show featuring an Avro Canada CF-100 Canuck. Following construction of the new passenger terminal, McCall Field would see 110,984 passenger arrivals, 96,287 departures and nearly 1,000,000 pounds (450,000 kg) of cargo through the airport in 1957.

In the 1960s Calgary City Council began lobbying the federal government to designate McCall Field as an "international airport", a status defined by the Department of Transportation. As a compromise on 6 April 1962, the federal government approved naming the airport terminal Calgary International Airport from Calgary Municipal Airport. However, Mayor Harry Hays, local aldermen and residents continued to refer to the airport in general as McCall Field. Calgary International Airport did not receive official "International" status from the federal government until 1969. The first non-stop transatlantic flights were scheduled by Canadian Pacific Airlines in 1961, connecting Calgary with Amsterdam Airport Schiphol, and more flights from Europe commenced the following year.

The jet age arrived shortly after the construction of Calgary's new passenger terminal. The terminal was not designed with jet aircraft in mind, and the airport's runways were not suitable for the larger and faster aircraft. In 1961 the airport replaced the diagonal runway with an 8,000 feet (2,400 m) runway capable of handling modern jet aircraft. In 1963 the airport underwent a $4-million refurbishment which saw improved electronic landing aids, and the main north–south runway extended by 4,675 feet (1,425 m) to its present length of 12,675 feet (3,863 m).

The City of Calgary was unable to afford the continued upgrades the Calgary Municipal Airport necessary to cope with the rising aircraft traffic. The city proceeded to sell the Calgary Municipal Airport to the federal government in 1966 for $2 million, and the Department of Transportation proceeded to refurbish the runways shortly afterwards.

=== 1970s: Terminal and hub status ===
The new passenger terminal constructed in 1956 proved to only temporarily meet the needs of the city, and was inadequate for expansion or facilitating jet aircraft servicing. Following the sale of the Calgary International Airport by the City of Calgary to the Government of Canada in 1966, plans were put in motion to build a new passenger terminal. The airport's sale came with a promise by Federal Transportation Minister Jack Pickersgill that the federal government would build a $20-million passenger terminal within five years; however, continued delays pushed completion of the terminal to 1977.

Construction began on the new passenger terminal in 1972, construction would be delayed due to re-designs to meet increased air traffic needs, causing the price of the new terminal to grow well beyond the original $20-million figure. Finally, on 12 October 1977, the new $130-million (equivalent to $1,052-million in 2025), 600,000 square feet (56,000 m^{2}) terminal was opened by Mayor Rod Sykes, Provincial Transportation Minister Hugh Horner, and Federal Transportation Minister Otto Lang two months before construction had completed. Sykes was able to leverage his friendship with Lord Mountbatten to convince British Airways to have one of the newly introduced Concorde land in Calgary on the day, and although the jet showed up a day late due to mechanical issues, it was still quite the coup for a city of less than half a million residents. Among other festivities for the opening event included flyovers by a Boeing 747, Lockheed F-104 Starfighter, and the Canadian Air Force Snowbirds. The 1977 passenger terminal remains the core of Calgary International Airport's domestic terminal to this day.

The Jumbo Jet age arrived in Calgary with the newly introduced Boeing 747 landing for the first time in 1973, with Wardair providing non-stop bi-weekly charter service from Calgary to London. Air Canada was not far behind, and began non-stop service to London using the 747 starting on 27 June 1974. In April 1974, Calgary International Airport hosted CP Air's flight testing for the Boeing 747 after airport firefighters went on strike at both Vancouver International Airport and Toronto Pearson Airport.

In 1974 the Government of Alberta acquired ownership of Pacific Western Airlines, Canada's third largest airline at the time and moved the head office and hub to Calgary. The airline continued under provincial government ownership until 1983, and later merged with Canadian Pacific Air Lines to form Canadian Airlines. Canadian Airlines maintained Calgary as the hub and headquarters for the airline until it was acquired by Air Canada in 2001.

=== 1990s: Reorganization and WestJet ===
In the early 1990s, the Government of Canada introduced the National Airports Policy which moved towards privatization, liberalization and economic deregulation of air transportation, which included the formation of a local airport authority under the name Calgary Airport Authority in 1992 for the management, operation and development of the Calgary International Airport under lease from the federal government. The Calgary Airport Authority, incorporated in July 1990 is a non-share capital, not-for-profit corporation formed under the authority of Alberta's Regional Airports Authorities Act. The Calgary Airport Authority signed a long-term 60-year lease with an additional 20-year option, which was subsequently exercised in 2011.

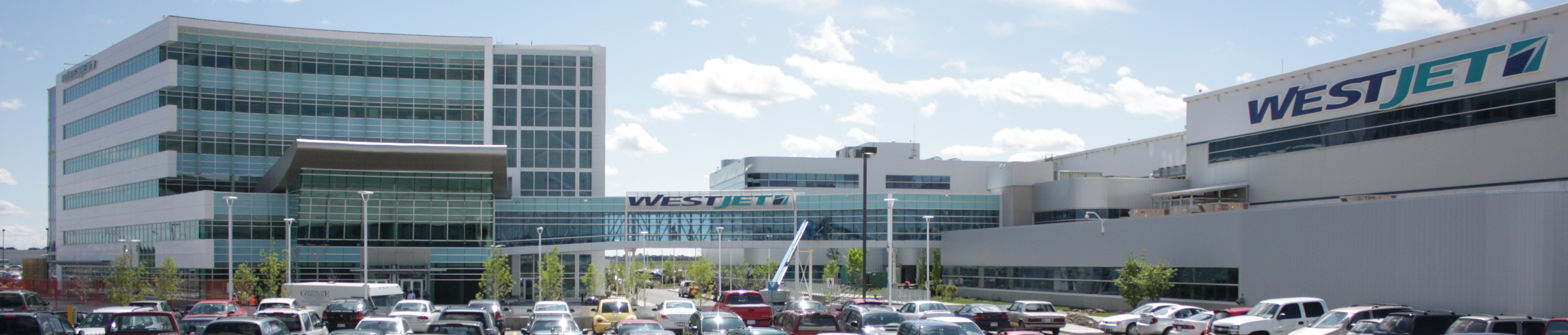
The WestJet campus is located at the airport.

In 1992, Calgary International Airport opened a new air traffic control tower at the southern end of Aero Drive. The control tower when completed was 44 metres (144 ft) tall with 38 square metres (410 sq ft) of office room, and was designed with the knowledge that it would not provide the necessary line of sight to the expanded east airfield.

In February 1996, WestJet, which began as a low-cost carrier began operations with a base of operations at Calgary International, occupying an expanded area of the terminal. The airline's first flight, a Boeing 737 departed Calgary International on route to Vancouver International Airport on 29 February 1996.

=== Operation Yellow Ribbon ===
During the September 11, 2001 attacks 13 international flights destined for the United States were diverted to Calgary International Airport as part of Operation Yellow Ribbon. The operation was a joint effort between NAV Canada and Transport Canada in communication with the U.S. Federal Aviation Administration, which facilitated the grounding of potentially destructive air traffic.

=== 2000s: Runway and new terminal ===
The Calgary Airport Authority began analyzing the facility's air capacity in the late 1990s, and found the airport could reach its maximum capacity as early as 2006. The Airport Authority and NAV Canada made a number of changes to airport operations in the 2000s to improve the efficiency and capacity of the facility, but by 2008, with a number of changes made, NAV Canada reported the airfield would begin to exceed its practical capacity. The Calgary Airport Authority planned and under the "Airport Development Program", a major development program aimed at improving the capacity and quality of the airport, which included the construction of a new runway, air traffic control tower and passenger terminal.

On 25 May 2013, the new Air Traffic Control Tower opened at Calgary International Airport. The one-year, $25-million (equivalent to $33-million) project came in advance of the airport's new runway, and at 91 m (300 ft), the tower was the tallest free-standing control tower in Canada. The airport's previous 44 m control tower was demolished in October 2014.

The Calgary Airport Authority initiated the Parallel Runway Project, a $620-million (equivalent to $813-million) project to assess and construct a new runway, which led to the construction of the 14,000 feet (4,300 m) runway 17L/35R beginning in April 2011. Upon its completion on 28 June 2014, runway 17L/35R became the longest runway in Canada. During the construction of the runway, a $295-million (equivalent to $387-million), 620 m (2,030 ft), six-lane roadway tunnel was constructed underneath the runway to connect Barlow Trail to 36th Street N.E. and now, to the edge of the city at the major freeway of Stoney Trail, Calgary's "Ring Road." The decision for Calgary City Council on whether to construct the tunnel while the runway was being constructed, or wait until a later date was a major issue during the 2010 Calgary municipal election.

The Airport Authority addressed cargo capacity through the construction of a 30,000 sq ft (2,800 m^{2}) cargo facility in 2015 followed by a 100,000 sq ft (9,300 m^{2}) facility constructed in 2016.

The final stage of the Calgary Airport Authority's Airport Development Program was the construction of a new $1.6-billion (equivalent to $2.05-billion) international terminal. Officially opened on 31 October 2016, the international terminal 186,000 square metres (2,000,000 sq ft) facility added 24 new aircraft gates, North America's first call-to-gate passenger boarding system, CATSA Plus enhanced passenger screening system, moving walkways and electric concourse connection tram system. The international terminal was designed with several sustainable principles including 581 geothermal wells for heating and cooling, and an annual rainwater capture capacity of 800,000 litres (180,000 imp gal; 210,000 US gal).

In October 2016, Transport Canada officially renamed Calgary International Airport to "YYC Calgary International Airport", affixing the "YYC" IATA code to the airport's name.

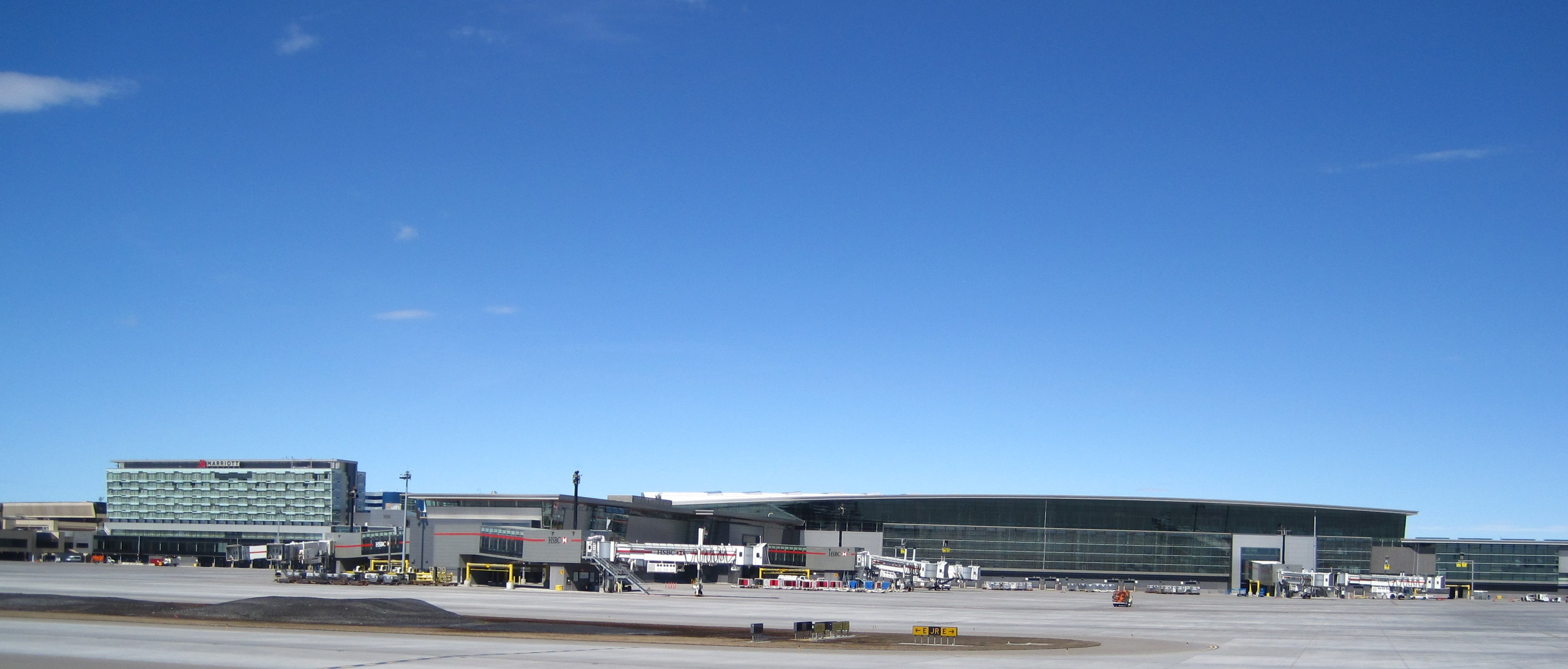
YYC in April 2020

In 2020, after several months of travel restrictions due to the COVID-19 pandemic, the governments of Alberta and Canada announced a new program to enable certain travellers to enter Canada more easily. Canadian citizens and essential workers entering Canada at Calgary, as well as at the Sweetgrass–Coutts Border Crossing, can be tested for the virus and, if they test negative, will be allowed to quarantine for only 48 hours instead of the usual 14 days.

On August 5, 2024, a hailstorm damaged the airport and numerous WestJet aircraft, but there were no injuries. While the other damaged areas of the airport were repaired promptly, Concourse B and its gates (gates 31-40) will be closed for at least 18 months, but this will not impact airport operations.

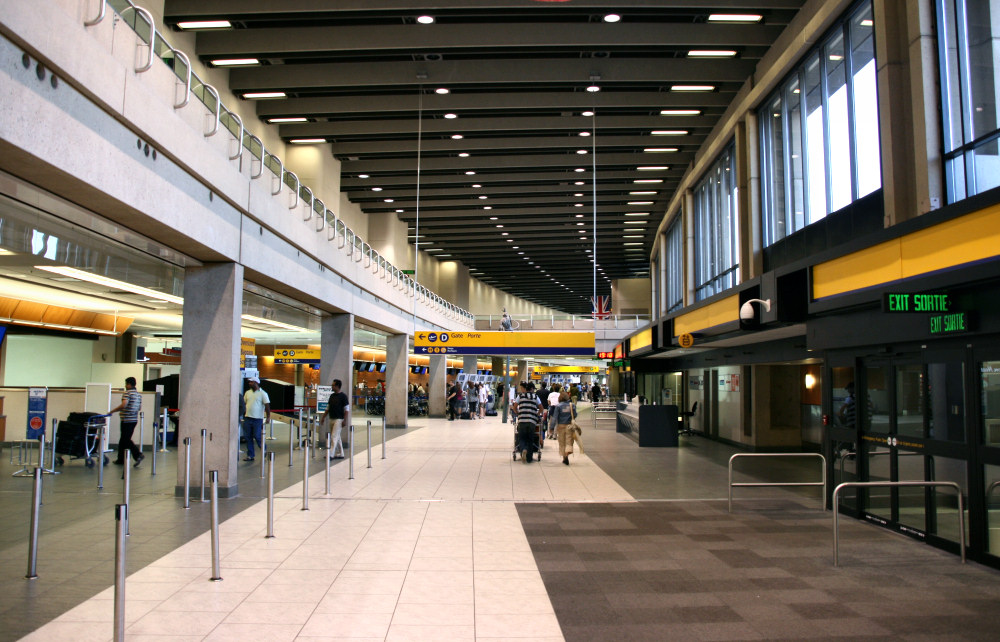
Inside the domestic terminal

== Infrastructure ==
=== Passenger terminals ===
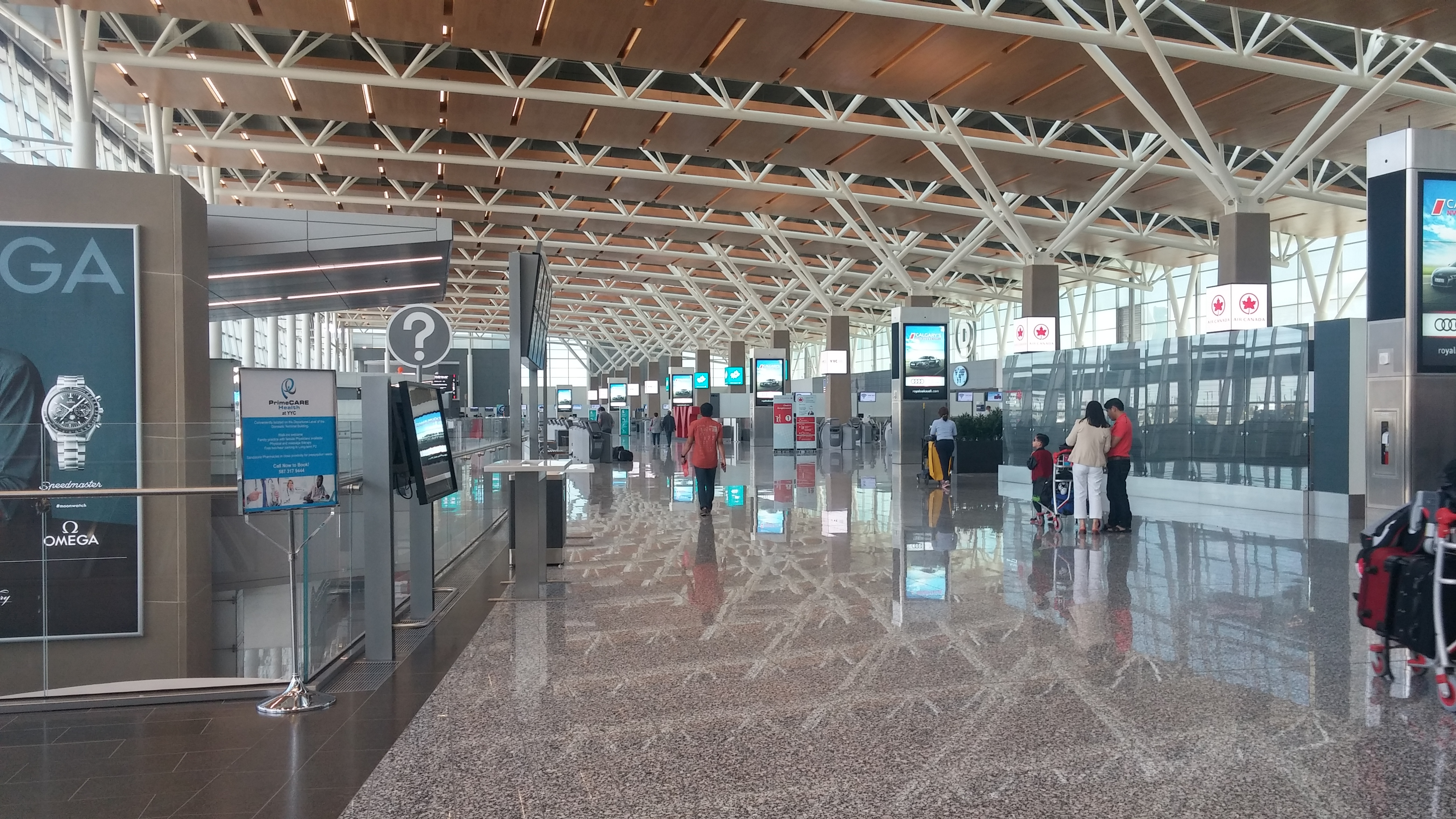
Inside the US and international terminal

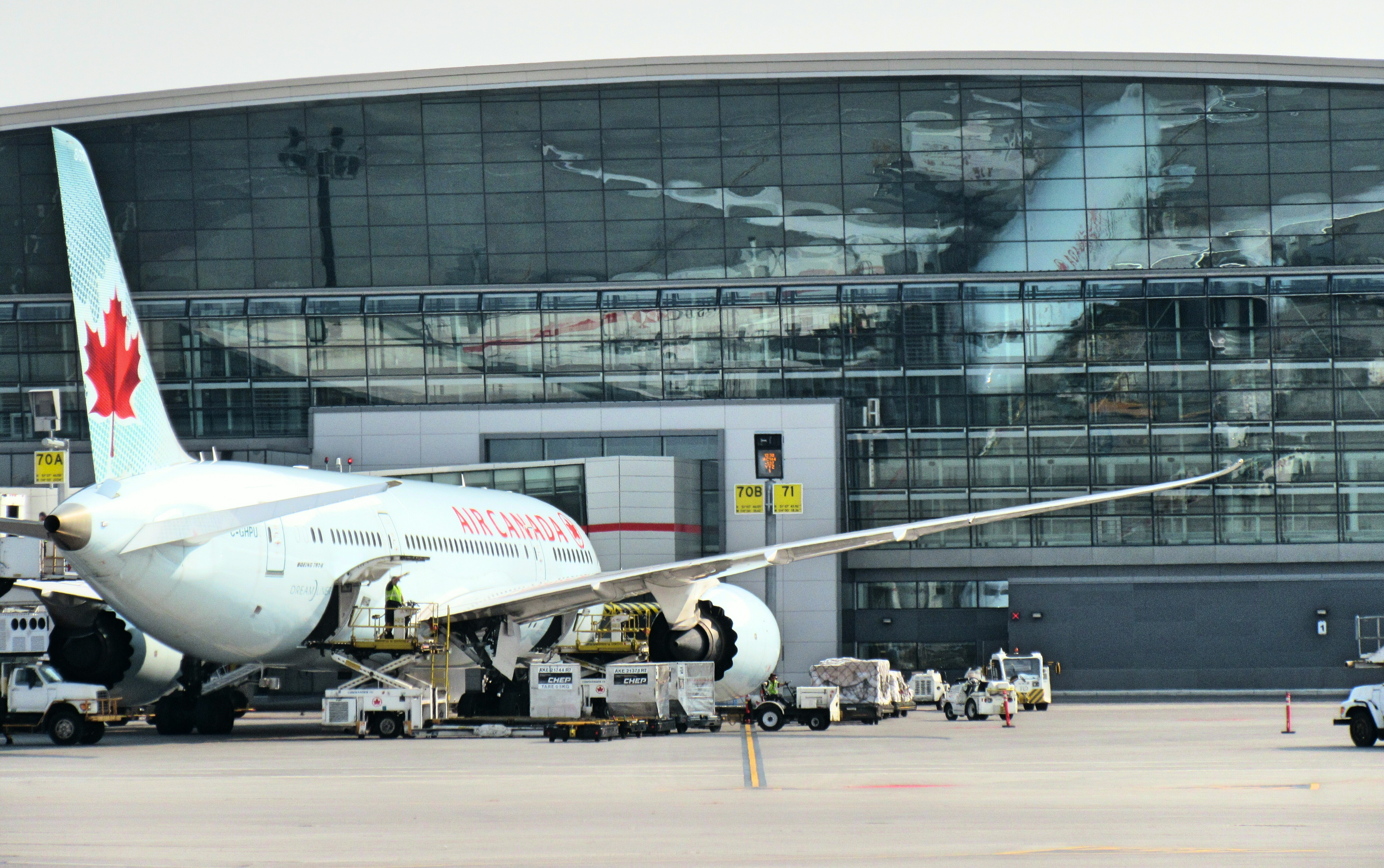
Concourse D at Calgary International Airport

The Calgary International Airport houses two passenger terminals, one for domestic flights and the other for United States and international flights.

The four-storey Domestic Terminal was originally opened in 1977 and has undergone a number of renovations in the decades following. The ground level of the terminal serves as the arrivals area with baggage claim and transportation facilities present. The second level of the terminal serves as the departures level and includes airport check-in, security and access to departure gates. The basement level of the airport contains utilities and tenant storage while the mezzanine level contains a food court, airline offices and the airport authority offices. The Domestic Terminal has four concourses: Concourses A1, A2, B, and C. All A, B and C gates are shared between domestic airlines such as Air Canada and Westjet (and their subsidiaries) predominantly, as well as Flair Airlines, Air North, Air Transat and Porter Airlines. Westjet primarily uses A gates, Air Canada flights primarily use C gates, and B gates are used by all airlines. Concourse A1 includes departure gates A1-A6 (used for WestJet regional non-jet flights); Concourse A2 includes gates A11-A24; Concourse B includes departure gates B31-B40; and Concourse C includes departure gates C50-C65.

The International Terminal was originally opened on 31 October 2016 and consists of five levels; utilities and baggage processing in the basement. Arrivals meet and greet areas, Canada Customs and relevant infrastructure on the ground level with departure check-in, security, US customs and the international departures concourse being located on the second floor. The third level contains the USA departures concourse and finally, the mezzanine level contains the international departures lounges. The International Terminal includes gates 70 through 97. Each gate can be accessed from either of two concourses, which are stacked one on top of the other: Concourse D for all flights to and from foreign countries except the US as well as domestic flights; and Concourse E for flights to and from the United States. For the International Terminal, passengers travelling to the United States clear customs and immigration prior to departure at the preclearance facility.

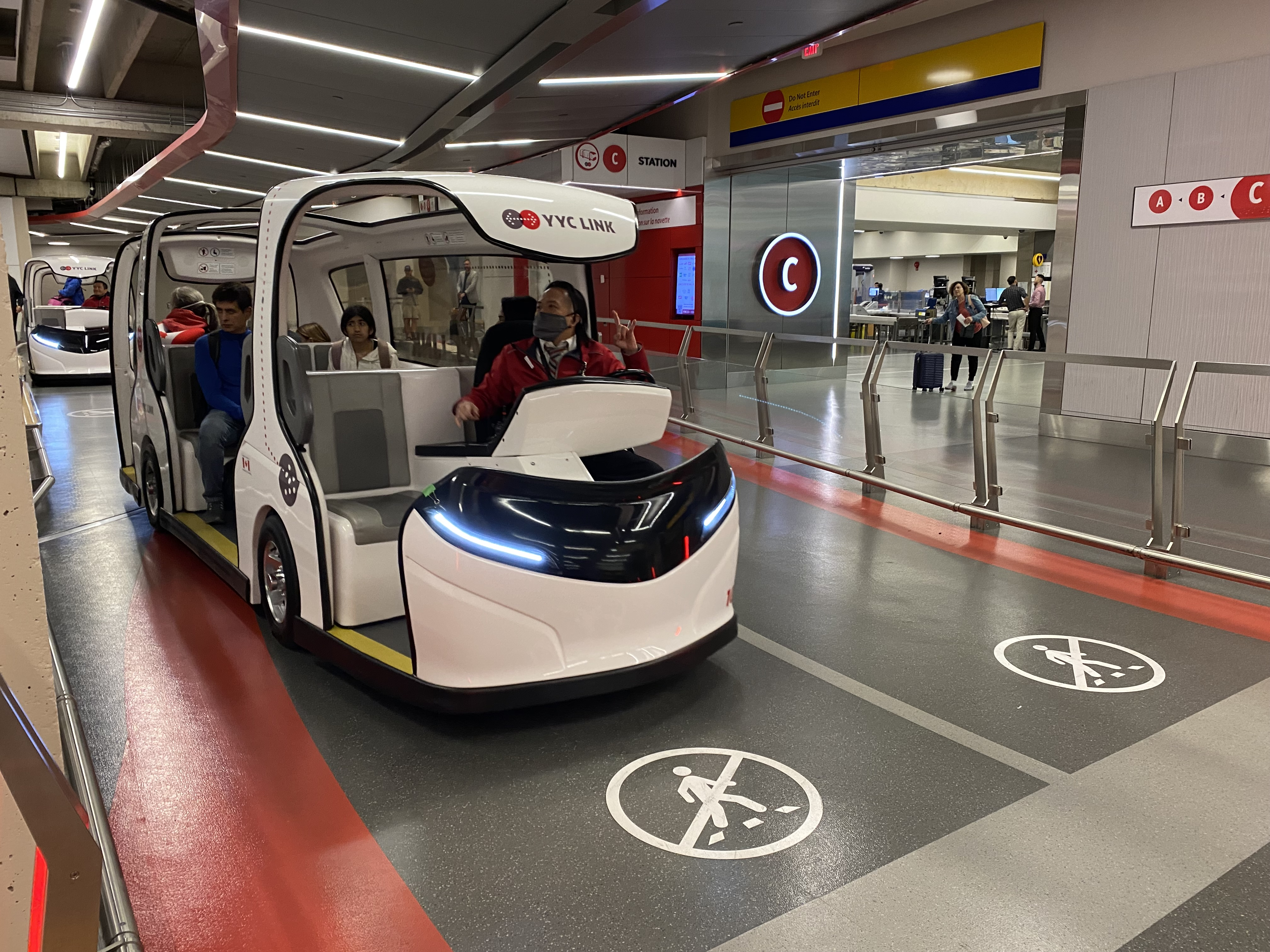
YYC Link shuttle

The Domestic Terminal is connected to the International Terminal by a 620-metre (2,030 ft)walkway corridor and path for the YYC Link Passengers Shuttles; twenty ten-seat electric vehicles used to transport connecting passengers.

WestJet, headquartered in Calgary and for which Calgary is the hub, has criticized the design of the international terminal, which opened in 2016. The airline's CEO stated that the distance between the terminals was too long for connecting travellers and that YYC Link was insufficient to solve this problem. As a result, WestJet had to alter its schedules in order to allow additional time for passengers transiting through Calgary. The Calgary Airport Authority responded that it did not see issues with the connections process, although it said passengers would need some time to adjust to the new facilities.

=== Runways ===
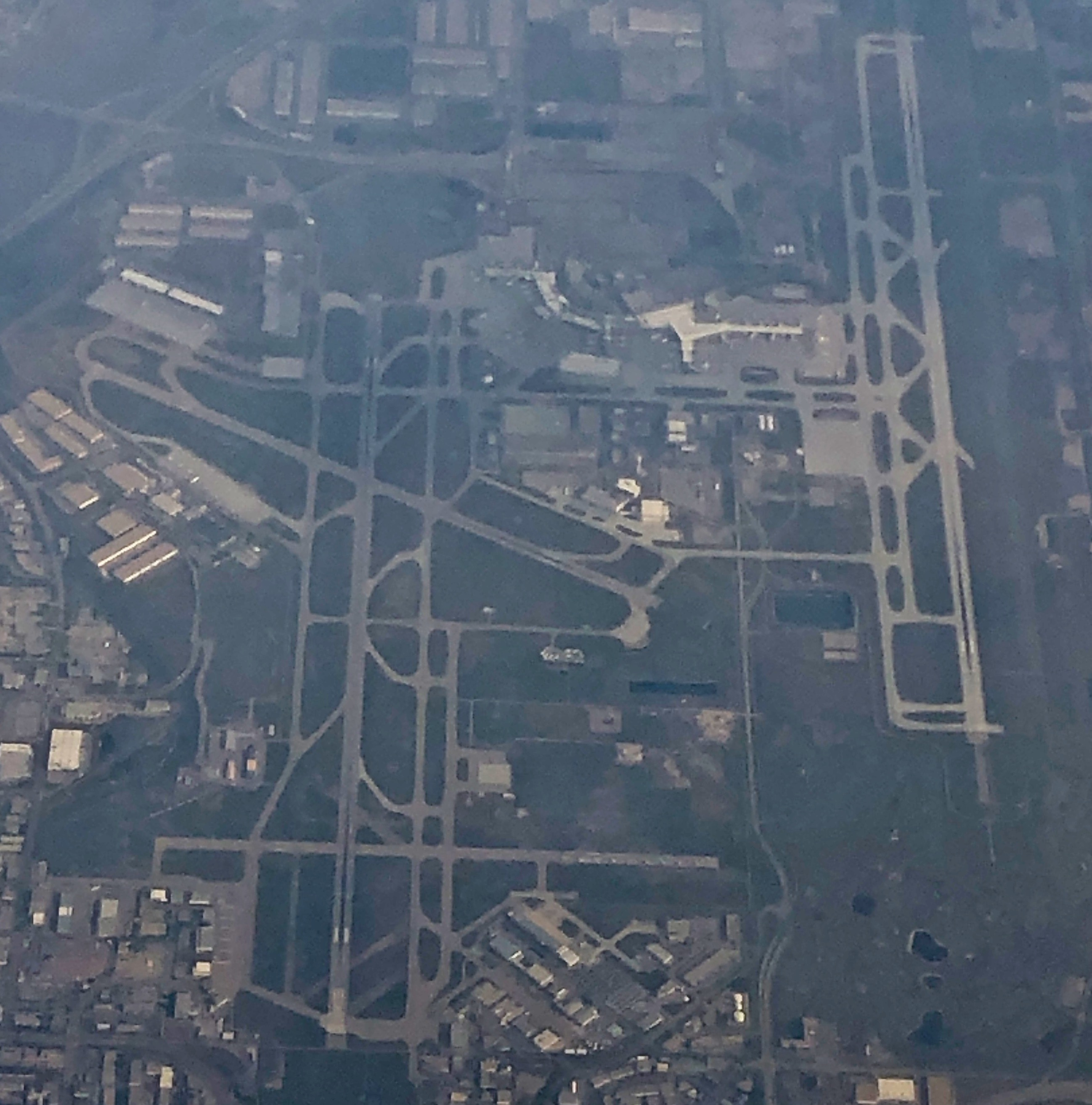
Aerial view of runway layout, 2021. Runway 08/26 (now a taxiway) runs horizontally near bottom of image; 11/29 is diagonal left of center; 17R/35L is vertical left of image centre; and 17L/35R is vertical at right side of image. Numerous taxiways connect to the passenger terminals toward top-right, cargo terminals and other aviation facilities.

Calgary International Airport consists of two north–south parallel runways and one intersecting runway. The parallel runways are 17R/35L (west) which is generally used for aircraft arriving and departing to the west, and 17L/35R (east) which is generally used for aircraft arriving and departing to the east. During the winter months in Calgary, cold arctic air will move in from the north which means aircraft will primarily depart and arrive on north-facing runways (35R and 35L), while the summer months with warm winds from the south, aircraft will primarily take-off and land on south-facing runways (17R and 17L). The diagonal runway 11/29 is generally used when crosswinds are present, which commonly occurs in the winter when westerly Chinooks roll into Calgary, or when extreme wind conditions prohibit the use of the parallel runways. The former fourth and smallest runway, 08/26, was almost exclusively used by light aircraft and the general aviation sector, and as of October 3, 2024, has been officially redesignated as a taxiway.

Calgary International Airport's three runways are as follows. with the following dimensions:

- Runway 11/29 is 8,000 ft × 200 ft (2,438 m × 61 m)
- Runway 17R/35L is 12,675 ft × 200 ft (3,863 m × 61 m)
- Runway 17L/35R is 14,000 ft × 200 ft (4,267 m × 61 m)

The longest runway in Canada at the time of its 2014 opening, Runway 17L/35R was built to reduce congestion and better accommodate larger, heavier aircraft: the weight of such aircraft, combined with the low air density resulting from the airport's high elevation and temperatures during the summer, means that a longer runway is necessary for take-off. Runway 17L/35R is also layered with concrete, a material more durable than the asphalt that composes the airport's other runways.

=== Cargo area ===
The airport has allotted an extensive amount of area for cargo operations, including over 3,000,000 square feet (280,000 m^{2}) of warehouse space. Freight airlines such as Cargolux make regular trips to Europe, Asia, and other destinations. In 2017, the Calgary airport handled a total of 147,000 tonnes (144,678 tons) of cargo.

In 2011, Calgary International Airport received the Air Cargo World Award of Excellence for airports between 100,000 and 199,999 cargo tonnage, having the highest score for Canadian airports, and second highest for North-American airports.

=== Hotels ===
Calgary International Airport has two hotels located on site. The Calgary Airport Marriott In-Terminal Hotel is located in the international passenger terminal and that opened 1 September 2016. The Delta Hotels by Marriott Calgary Airport In-Terminal is located near the domestic passenger terminal.

=== Other facilities ===
At 91 metres (299 ft), the airport's air traffic control tower was the tallest standalone control tower in Canada upon its opening in 2013; compared to the previous tower, it has space for more air traffic controllers and is situated closer to the centre of the airport, giving controllers better views of the airfield. Meanwhile, the headquarters of WestJet and its subsidiary WestJet Encore are located onsite.

== Airlines and destinations ==
=== Passenger ===
Airlines	Destinations
Air Canada	London–Heathrow, Montréal–Trudeau, Newark, Ottawa, Toronto–Pearson, Vancouver
Air Canada Express	Edmonton, Fort McMurray, Grande Prairie, Kelowna, Vancouver, Winnipeg
Air Canada Rouge	Seasonal: Cancún (begins December 11, 2026), Puerto Vallarta (begins December 10, 2026)
Air North	Edmonton, Whitehorse
Alaska Airlines	Seattle/Tacoma
American Airlines	Dallas/Fort Worth; Seasonal: Charlotte, Chicago–O'Hare, New York–JFK, New York–LaGuardia
Central Mountain Air	Prince George
Condor	Seasonal: Frankfurt
Delta Air Lines	Minneapolis/St. Paul
Delta Connection	Salt Lake City
Discover Airlines	Frankfurt; Seasonal: Munich
Edelweiss Air	Seasonal: Zürich
Etihad Airways	Abu Dhabi
Flair Airlines	Abbotsford, Kitchener/Waterloo, Toronto–Pearson, Vancouver; Seasonal: Kelowna, Puerto Vallarta, Winnipeg, Victoria
KLM	Amsterdam
Porter Airlines	Hamilton (ON), Montréal–MET, Montréal–Trudeau, Ottawa, Toronto–Pearson; Seasonal: Phoenix–Sky Harbor (begins December 20, 2026),
United Airlines	Chicago–O'Hare, Denver, Houston–Intercontinental, San Francisco; Seasonal: Washington–Dulles
WestJet	Abbotsford, Atlanta, Cancún, Chicago–O'Hare, Comox, Edmonton, Halifax, Hamilton (ON), Honolulu, Houston–Intercontinental, Kahului, Kelowna, Kitchener/Waterloo, Liberia (CR), London–Heathrow, London (ON), Los Angeles, Mazatlán, Mexico City–Benito Juárez, Moncton, Montréal–Trudeau, Nanaimo, New York–JFK, Ottawa, Paris–Charles de Gaulle, Phoenix–Sky Harbor, Puerto Vallarta, Punta Cana, Regina, San Diego, San Francisco, San José del Cabo, Saskatoon, Seattle/Tacoma, Tampa, Tokyo–Narita, Toronto–Pearson, Vancouver, Victoria, Winnipeg; Seasonal: Anchorage, Austin, Barcelona, Belize City, Boston, Charlottetown, Cozumel, Deer Lake, Denver, Detroit, Dublin, Edinburgh, Fredericton, Huatulco, Ixtapa/Zihuatanejo, Kailua-Kona, Loreto, Manzanillo, Mérida (begins December 17, 2026), Montego Bay, Nashville, Nassau, North Bay, Panama City–Tocumen, Puerto Escondido, Puerto Plata, Québec City, Rome–Fiumicino, São Paulo–Guarulhos (begins December 15, 2026), Sault Ste. Marie, Seoul–Incheon, Sudbury, Sydney (NS), Tepic, Thunder Bay, Tulum, Whitehorse, Windsor; Charter: Fort MacKay
WestJet Encore	Abbotsford, Brandon, Cranbrook, Edmonton, Fort McMurray, Fort St. John, Grande Prairie, Kamloops, Kelowna, Nanaimo, Penticton, Prince George, Regina, Saskatoon, Seattle/Tacoma, Terrace/Kitimat, Victoria; Seasonal: Campbell River,Comox, Portland (OR), Yellowknife; Charter: Fort MacKay

== Statistics ==
In 2024, YYC Calgary International Airport remained Canada’s fourth-busiest airport, welcoming approximately 18.9 million passengers, a new milestone that surpassed its previous pre-pandemic record from 2019. In addition to the surge in passenger traffic, YYC also handled 5,217 cargo landings, compared with 4,946 landings in 2023, underscoring its importance as a key logistics hub in Western Canada.

=== Passenger and cargo traffic ===
Calgary International Airport passenger and cargo volumes since 2010 are provided in the following table:

Passenger and cargo traffic at Calgary International Airport, 2010–2024
Year	Passengers	Change	Cargo (kg)	Change	Notes
2010	12,630,695	Steady	120,000	Steady	
2011	12,770,988	▲1.1%	116,000	▼3.3%	
2012	13,641,339	▲6.8%	119,000	▲2.6%	
2013	14,316,074	▲4.9%	122,000	▲2.5%	(Note: Calgary International became the third-busiest airport in Canada for the first time, ahead of Montréal–Trudeau International Airport.)
2014	15,261,108	▲6.6%	128,710	▲5.5%	
2015	15,475,759	▲1.4%	134,695	▲4.6%	(Note: Calgary International became the third-busiest airport in Canada for the second time, ahead of Montréal–Trudeau International Airport.)
2016	15,680,616	▲1.3%	137,255	▲1.7%	
2017	16,275,862	▲3.8%	147,000	▲7.3%	
2018	17,343,402	▲6.6%	146,000	▼0.7%	
2019	17,957,780	▲3.5%	155,820	▲6.7%	
2020	5,675,483	▼68.40%	N/A	N/A	
2021	6,326,406	▲11.47%	N/A	N/A	
2022	14,452,059	▲128.4%	N/A	N/A	
2023	18,493,523	▲28.0%	N/A	N/A	
2024	18,895,684	▲2.2%	N/A	N/A	
2025	19,409,550	▲2.7%	N/A	N/A	

=== Top destinations ===
Busiest domestic routes from YYC (as of 6 June 2025)
Rank	Destinations	Flights per week	Carriers
1	Vancouver, British Columbia	213	Air Canada, Flair, WestJet
2	Toronto–Pearson, Ontario	184	Air Canada, Flair, Porter, WestJet
3	Edmonton, Alberta	103	Air Canada, Air North, WestJet
4	Winnipeg, Manitoba	75	Air Canada, Flair, WestJet
5	Kelowna, British Columbia	62	Air Canada, Flair, WestJet
6	Victoria, British Columbia	59	Flair, WestJet
=7	Saskatoon, Saskatchewan	51	WestJet
=7	Abbotsford, British Columbia	51	Flair, WestJet
9	Montreal, Quebec	50	Air Canada, Porter, WestJet
10	Ottawa, Ontario	45	Air Canada, Porter, WestJet

Busiest transborder routes from YYC to the United States and Mexico (2024)
Rank	Airport	Passengers	Carriers
1	Los Angeles, California	370,076	WestJet
2	Las Vegas, Nevada	354,066	WestJet
3	Phoenix–Sky Harbor, Arizona	312,153	WestJet
4	Houston–Intercontinental, Texas	282,113	United, WestJet
5	Denver, Colorado	274,100	United, WestJet
6	San Francisco, California	268,308	United, WestJet
7	Chicago, Illinois	225,438	American, United, WestJet
8	Seattle, Washington	224,032	Alaska, WestJet
9	Dallas, Texas	195,910	American
10	Atlanta, Georgia	175,091	WestJet
11	Minneapolis, Minnesota	155,348	Delta, WestJet
12	Cancun, Mexico	141,088	WestJet
13	Palm Springs, California	132,811	WestJet
14	Puerto Vallarta, Mexico	113,543	WestJet
15	Orlando, Florida	110,246	WestJet

Busiest routes from YYC to Europe (2024)
Rank	Airport	Passengers	Carriers
1	London, United Kingdom	404,401	Air Canada, WestJet
2	Frankfurt, Germany	231,739	Condor, Discover
3	Amsterdam, Netherlands	210,799	KLM
4	Paris, France	183,591	WestJet
5	Rome, Italy	120,628	WestJet

== Ground transportation ==
Deerfoot Trail provides freeway access to the rest of the city. There is also a tunnel beneath Runway 17L/35R that links the east side of the airport site to the terminal buildings. Two parking garages and a rental-car facility are situated across from the terminals. Public transport options are also available at the airport: Buses operated by Calgary Transit link YYC Calgary International to downtown, a nearby station of the local CTrain light-rail network, and other parts of the city.

== Notable accidents and incidents ==
- On 10 May 1945, Royal Air Force No. 105 Squadron de Havilland DH.98 Mosquito B Mk IX (LR503) struck the control tower roof shortly after takeoff, shearing off the planes port wing, and crashed into the ground killing both crew members. The Mosquito, known as "F for Freddie" was a survivor of 213 operations over Europe, and crashed while performing a low level pass for spectators prior to flying to Red Deer and Lethbridge as part of cross country tour to garner support for 8th Victory Loan Drive.
- On August 24, 1963, West Coast Airlines Flight 794, a Fairchild F-27 departing from Spokane International Airport to Calgary via Cranbrook made a crash-landing shortly before the runway. The probable cause of the accident was the pilot failed to maintain the approved minimum altitude on approach. There were no fatalities.
- On March 22, 1984, Pacific Western Airlines Flight 501, a Boeing 737-200, aborted a take-off and exited the runway onto a taxiway after a component of the left engine broke off and hit the fuel stores in the wing, resulting in a fire that spread over the left and back portions of the plane. The flight attendants evacuated all passengers, while some suffered severe injuries, all the occupants survived.
- On July 17, 1990, an Ecuadorian Air Force de Havilland Canada DHC-5 Buffalo (Registration HC-BFH) being ferried to Calgary from Quito, via Billings, had the nosegear collapse following touchdown on runway 28, igniting hydraulic fuel and resulting in the aircraft burning out. There were no fatalities.

== See also ==
- List of the busiest airports in North America
