= Julie Smith, Baroness Smith of Newnham =

British political scientist

The Right Honourable The Baroness Smith of Newnham
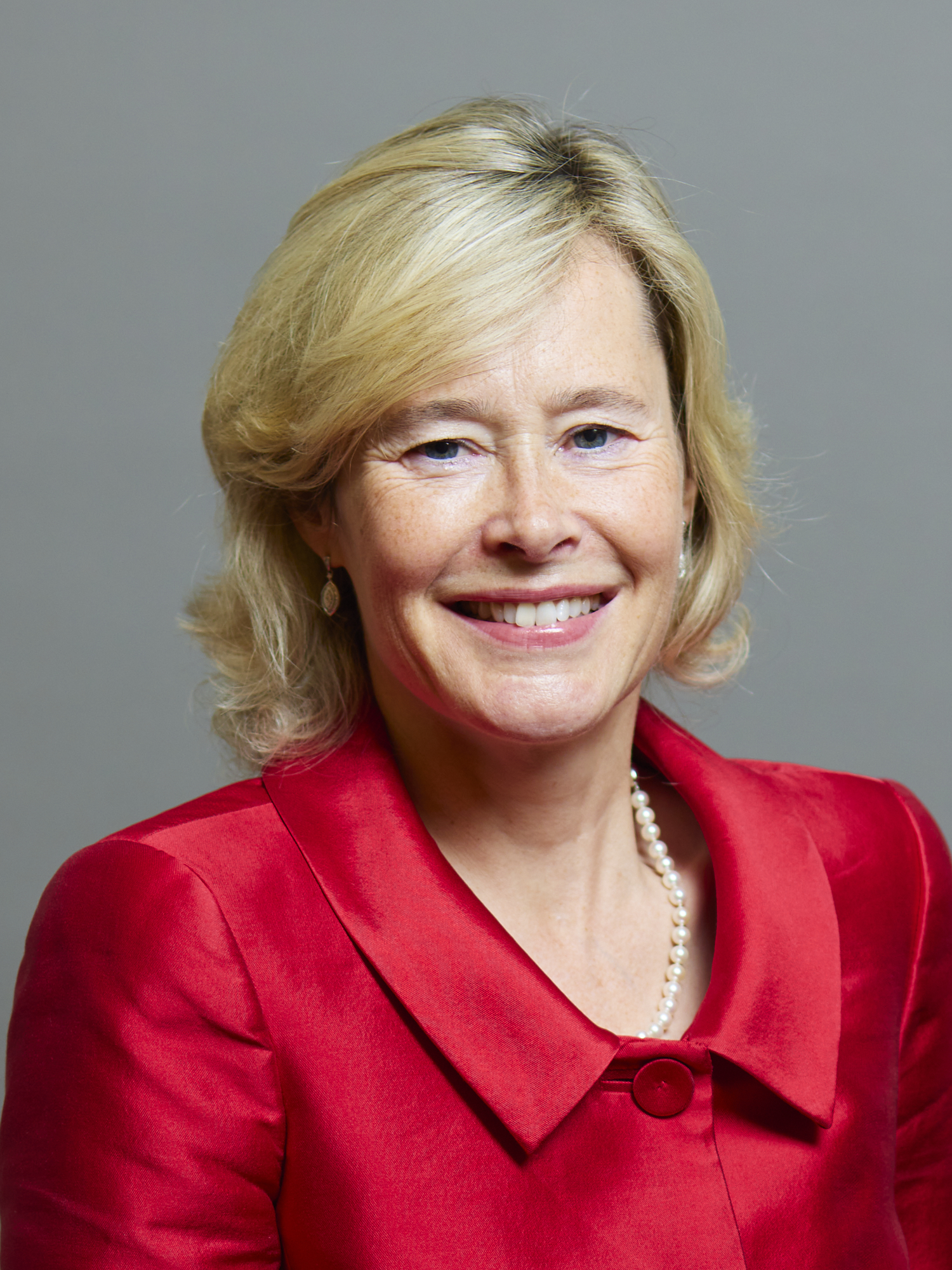
- Official portrait, 2021

Member of the House of Lords
- Lord Temporal
- Life peerage 12 September 2014

Member of Cambridge City Council for Newnham
- In office May 2003 – May 2015

Personal details
- Born: 1 June 1969 (age 57)
- Party: Liberal Democrat
- Education: Merchant Taylors' Girls' School
- Alma mater: Brasenose College, Oxford; St Antony's College, Oxford

Julie Elizabeth Smith, Baroness Smith of Newnham (born 1 June 1969) is an academic specialising in European politics and a Liberal Democrat politician. From 2003 to 2015, she was a local councillor on Cambridge City Council. Since September 2014, she has been a life peer and a member of the House of Lords. She is defence spokesperson for the party.

== Early life ==
Smith was born on 1 June 1969. From 1980 to 1987, she was educated at Merchant Taylors' Girls' School, an all-girls selective private school based in Great Crosby, Merseyside. After taking a gap year, she studied Philosophy, Politics and Economics at Brasenose College, Oxford and graduated with a Bachelor of Arts (BA) degree. She then undertook postgraduate study in politics at St Antony's College, Oxford, graduating with a Master of Philosophy (MPhil) degree and a Doctor of Philosophy (DPhil) degree. Her doctoral supervisor was William Wallace, and her doctoral thesis was titled "Direct elections to the European Parliament: a reevaluation" and was submitted in 1995. Having been awarded a Hanseatic Scholarship, she undertook further study in Hamburg from 1995 to 1997.

== Career ==
=== Academic career ===
Smith began her academic career lecturing in the International Relations and European Studies Department of the Central European University, an English-language university in Budapest, Hungary. In 1997, she joined the University of Cambridge as a lecturer in European politics. She was later promoted to senior lecturer in International Relations and became a Fellow of Robinson College. From 1999 to 2003, she was additionally the head of the European Programme at Chatham House. She was made a Reader in European Politics in October 2018. In 2021, she was appointed Professor of European Politics. Her academic work centres on democracy in Europe and on the UK’s relation with the EU and its Member States.

=== Political career ===
Smith is a Liberal Democrat politician. From 2003 to May 2015, she was a local councillor representing Newnham on Cambridge City Council. She was a member of the Liberal Democrats Federal Policy Committee until Autumn 2025.

In August 2014, it was announced that Smith would be made a life peer. On 12 September 2014 she was created Baroness Smith of Newnham, of Crosby in the County of Merseyside. She made her maiden speech in the House of Lords on 25 November 2014, during a debate on the United Kingdom's membership of the European Union.. She currently serves as the party's spokesperson on defence in the House of Lords and is a member of the European Affairs Committee.

=== Involvement in EU Referendum ===
As demonstrated by the topic of Smith's maiden speech, she is firmly convinced of the benefits that the EU brings to the UK.

She has now taken an active involvement in Cambridge for Europe, a campaign which wants "to spread a positive message regarding the UK's continued involvement in the EU". Smith is one of the group's leading patrons.

== Selected works ==
- Citizens' Europe?: European Elections and the Role of the European Parliament. Royal Institute of International Affairs. 1994. ISBN 0905031849.
- Voice of the people: European Parliament in the 1990s. Royal Institute of International Affairs. 1995. ISBN 0905031881.
- Europe's elected parliament (Contemporary European Studies). Sheffield Academic Press. 1999. ISBN 1850759995.
