= Emma Watkinson =

British entrepreneur and chief executive

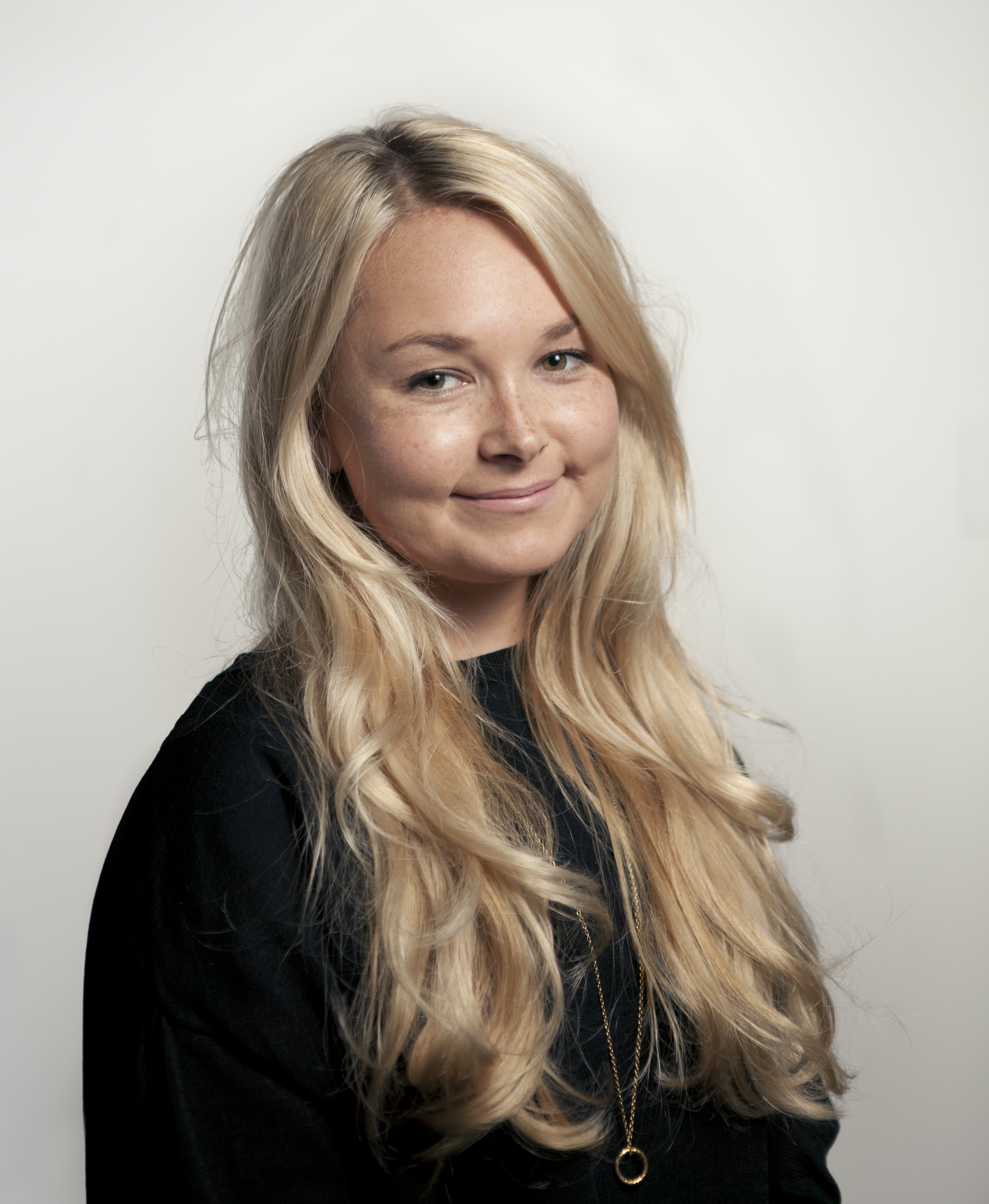
- Born: 1986 (age 39–40)
- Education: University of Liverpool
- Occupations: Entrepreneur, CEO
- Employer: SilkFred.com

Emma Watkinson is a British entrepreneur who co-founded and is chief executive officer of the online retail business SilkFred.

== Biography ==
=== Early life and education ===
Emma Watkinson was born in Liverpool in 1986. Her parents were entrepreneurs — her mother ran her own fashion boutiques, while her father started on a market stall and later owned pubs and nightclubs in Liverpool. Watkinson attended Merchant Taylors' Girls' School until 2000. Watkinson and her family moved to Marbella, Spain in 2001 where she attended The English International College. She graduated from the University of Liverpool in 2008 with a bachelor's degree in English. She began her career working part-time on the shop floor at Whistles in 2005 whilst studying at university and then went on to work on buying and merchandising teams for various retailers, including my-wardrobe.com.

In 2010, Watkinson lived in New York City and interned for various fashion magazines and websites, including Guest of a Guest.

=== SilkFred.com ===
In 2011, at the age of 24, Watkinson and her co-founders Stephen Jackson and Kate Jackson set up SilkFred, an online fashion retail platform that sells fashion from independent and emerging brands. They funded the venture with seed funding from angel investors, with additional capital through crowdfunding platform Crowdcube and later private equity firm Livingbridge. The Daily Telegraph reported that the company had sales of £11m in 2016, and generates 90% of sales through social media.

=== Mentorship and recognition ===
Watkinson is an advocate for female entrepreneurship and is an ambassador for Facebook’s "She Means Business" campaign. She is a mentor at the London College of Fashion and is listed there as an Inspirational Speaker. Watkinson has also taken part in 10 Downing Street's "Business is Great Britain" campaign to promote small UK businesses.

Watkinson was a finalist for "Entrepreneur of the Year" at the London Business Awards 2014, and for "Young Champion of the Year" at The Champion of Women Awards 2017.
