= Call-to-gate system =

A call-to-gate system is an airport terminal design in which passengers are kept in a central area until shortly before their flight is due to board, rather than waiting near their gate. The international terminal at Calgary International Airport was the first terminal in North America to use this system, which is also used by European airports such as London Heathrow. The system is used to decrease the amount of time that passengers spend around the gate area, thereby increasing the amount of time they spend in the retail areas of the terminal.
