= William Fulwood =

William Fulwood (fl. 1562), was an author.

Fulwood was a member of the Merchant Taylors' Company. His first effort was entitled An Admonition to Elderton to leave the Toyes by hym begonne. The Elderton in question was William Elderton (died c.1592), a ballad-writer, who wrote Eldertons Jestes with his mery Toyes (now lost). Fulwood's work was printed by John Allde, and begins:

A supplication to Elderton for Leaches unlewdness
Desiring him to pardon his manifest unrudeness.

In 1563 Fulwood published The Castel of Memorie; wherein is conteyned the restoryng, augmentyng, and conservyng of the Memorye and Remembraunce; with the latest remedyes and best preceptes thereunto in any wise apperteyning: Made by Gulielmus Gratarolus Bergomatis (Guglielmo Gratarolo of Bergamo, c.1516-c.1568), Doctor of Artes and Phisike. Englished by Willyam Fulwod. This volume contains a dedication in verse to "the Lord Robert Dudely", which states that the "King of Bohemia" has approved the book in its Latin form, and the late Edward VI in a French translation. The book contains many curious recipes for aiding the memory. A second edition appeared in 1573.

In 1568 Fulwood published the work by which he is best known: The Enimie of Idlenesse: Teaching the maner and stile how to endite, compose, and write all sorts of Epistles and Letters: as well by answer, as otherwise. Set forth in English by William Fulwood, Marchant. The volume is dedicated in verse to the "Master, Wardens, and Company of Marchant Tayllors", and became very popular, running through several editions. It is divided into four books. The first, with much original matter, contains translations from Cicero and the ancients; in the second the translations are from Poliziano, Ficino, Merula, Pico della Mirandola, and other Italian scholars; the third contains practical and personal letters, mainly original; and in the fourth are six metrical love letters, besides prose specimens. In subsequent editions seven metrical letters are found and other augmentations.
