= McKnight–Westwinds station =

Light rail station in Calgary, Alberta, Canada

McKnight–Westwinds
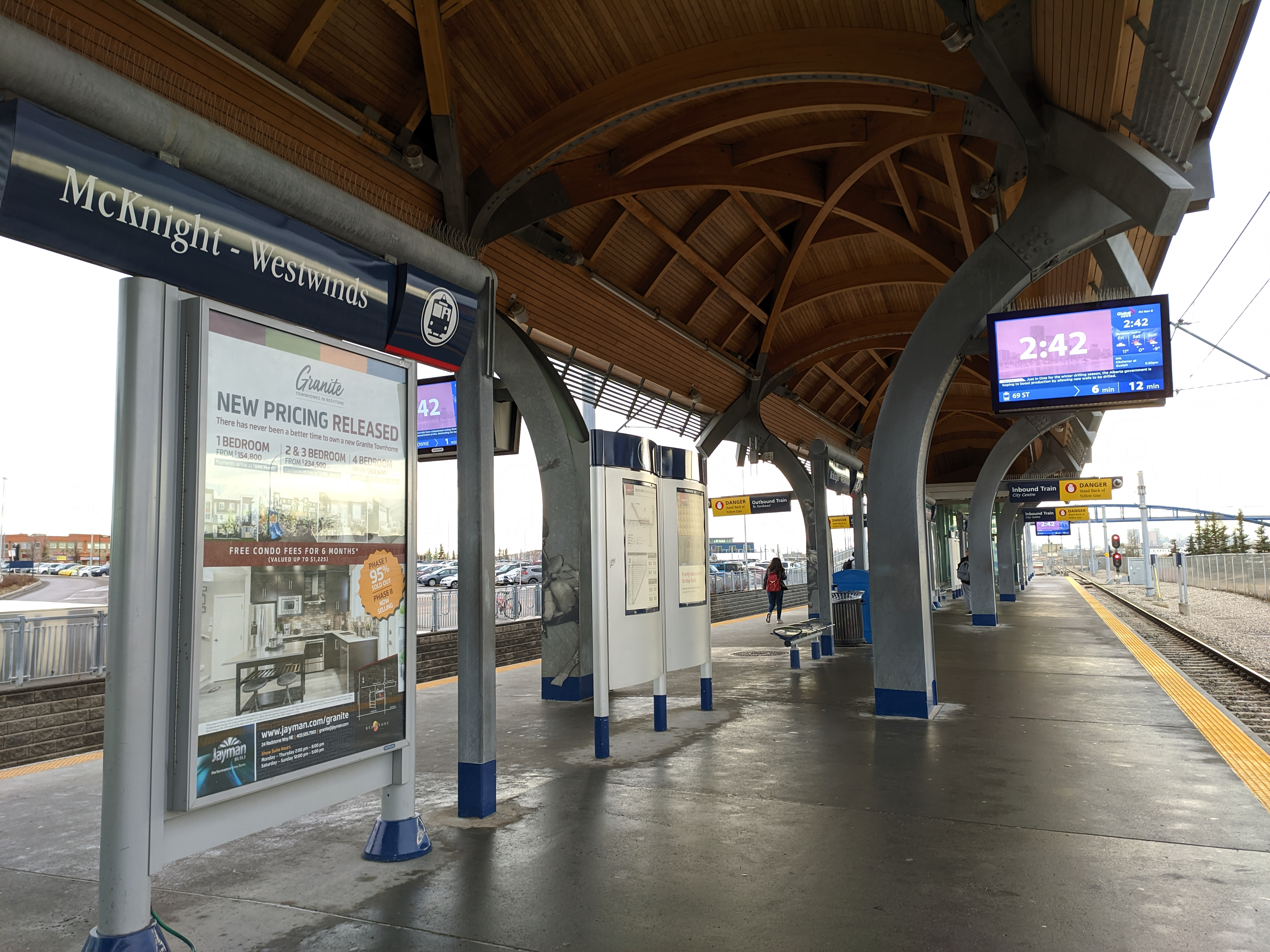

General information
- Location: 6200C - 36 Street NE
- Coordinates: 51°06′33″N 113°58′32.6″W
- Owner: Calgary Transit
- Line: Blue Line (202)
- Platforms: Center-loading platform
- Connections: 21 Castleridge; 55 Falconridge; 60 Martindale; 61 Taradale; 68 68 Street East

Construction
- Structure type: At-grade
- Parking: 949 spaces
- Accessible: yes

History
- Opened: 2007; 19 years ago

Services
Preceding station	Calgary Transit	Following station
Whitehorn toward 69 Street	Blue Line	Martindale toward Saddletowne
Location

McKnight–Westwinds Station is a CTrain light rail station in Calgary, Alberta, Canada. It serves the North-East Line (Route 202) and opened in 2007 as part of the line's first extension. It was the northern terminus of the line until Martindale station opened in 2012.

The station is located on an exclusive LRT right of way, north of the interchange at McKnight Boulevard and Métis Trail (formerly 44th St. NE). The station is 13 km from the City Hall Interlocking. 949 spaces are included at the stop, which is designed for commuter access. The station was only the terminus for less than five years, however, as a further extension (3.1 km) of the Northeast line to Saddle Ridge (originally planned to be complete by 2011) was approved in November 2007. The extension was opened on August 27, 2012, at the cost of $110 million. In the first year after the extension was completed, McKnight-Westwinds served average of 11,420 boardings per day.

Track crossing

Constructed along with the McKnight–Westwinds station, is the Oliver Bowen Maintenance Facility, located just South of the station. This facility is not only used for the maintenance of the fleet, but also has storage space for another 65 LRVs (light rail vehicles). This helps in the storage of the 22 additional LRVs that are planned to be purchased within the current 20-year capital plan. Previous to the 2007 extension, all NE LRVs had to come up from Anderson or Haysboro every morning. With the opening of OBMF, NE LRVs can stay on the NE line. Siemens U2s operating on the NW line provide service to Whitehorn or Saddletowne before going out of service for maintenance and then return to the NW line providing service from Whitehorn to Tuscany, before resuming regular operations.

== Layout ==
The station shares an almost identical design to the Somerset–Bridlewood Station which opened on the Red Line in 2004, and the South Campus/Fort Edmonton Park ETS Station which opened in Edmonton in 2009. Alongside this, Saddletowne and Chinook stations both share relatively similar designs, being outdoor central-median stations with canopies and at-grade crossings.

McKnight-Westwinds Station was the first station on the East leg of the Blue Line to not be in the median of a roadway, and the first to be outdoors.

== Station upgrades ==
Calgary Transit, in collaboration with Shaw Communications, announced on November 16, 2016, that 8 new locations for Public Wi-Fi services would be added to the Calgary C-Train system. These new locations would add public Wi-Fi to 18 new stations; including McKnight-Westwinds Station. These changes ere done as they would improve transit experience for their users, which would improve customer commitment.

== Transit connections ==
Bus connections as of 31 August, 2026:

- 21 - Castleridge (Counterclockwise)
- 55 - Falconridge (Clockwise)
- 60 - Martindale (North)
- 61 - Taradale (North)
- 68 - 68 Street E/East Hills (South)
