= Nelson Mandela: A Biography =

- Author: Martin Meredith
- Language: English
- Subject: The life of Nelson Mandela
- Genre: Biography
- Publisher: Public Affairs Books
- Publication date: 1997
- Publication place: United States
- Pages: 653

Nelson Mandela: A Biography is a biography written by Martin Meredith on Nelson Mandela. The book details Mandela's early life and major influences on him, his moving to Johannesburg, joining the African National Congress, his imprisonment on Robben Island, and eventually, his Presidency. Also chronicled are the rise and fall of apartheid, the scandals involving Winnie Mandela (Nelson's wife), and Thabo Mbeki's term as President.

== See also ==
- Long Walk to Freedom, Mandela's autobiography
