= Martindale station =

Light rail station in Calgary, Alberta, Canada

Martindale
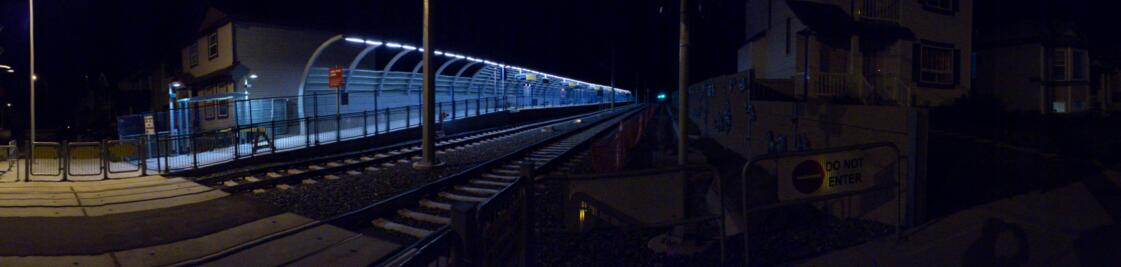

General information
- Coordinates: 51°07′03″N 113°58′04″W
- Owner: Calgary Transit
- Line: Blue Line (202)
- Platforms: Side-loading platforms
- Connections: 60 Martindale

Construction
- Structure type: At-grade
- Accessible: yes

History
- Opened: 2012; 14 years ago

Services
Preceding station	Calgary Transit	Following station
McKnight–Westwinds toward 69 Street	Blue Line	Saddletowne Terminus
Location

Martindale is a CTrain light rail station in Martindale, Calgary, Alberta. It serves the Northeast Line (Route 202). It opened August 27, 2012.

The station was constructed as part of a 2.9-kilometre extension of the Northeast line from McKnight–Westwinds station to Saddletowne station. It is located in a reserved right-of-way within its community, with the side-loading platforms to be staggered west and east of Martindale Boulevard. Due to its location in a residential area primarily serving local residents, there are no park-and-ride lots at the station nor a bus terminal, unlike most other CTrain stations in Calgary. Also, because of its location, CTrain speeds are reduced to 50 km/h (30 mph) in the general area.

In its first year of service, Martindale served an average of 2,400 boardings per day.

The opening of the Northeast extension was delayed by almost one year as the extension was originally planned to be open in late 2011.

== Station upgrades ==
Calgary Transit, in collaboration with Shaw Communications, announced on November 16, 2016 that 8 new locations for Public Wi-Fi services would be added to the Calgary C-Train system. These new locations would add public Wi-Fi to 18 new stations; including Martindale Station. These changes ere done as they would improve transit experience for their users, which would improve customer commitment.

== Transit connections ==
Bus connections to this station as of 31 August, 2026:

- 60 - Martindale (North) / 60 - Martindale (South)
