= Merchant Taylors' Girls' School =

- Merchant Taylors' Schools' Crest

Location
- Liverpool Road; Crosby, Merseyside, L23 0QP; England; 53°29′02″N 3°01′30″W

Information
- Type: Selective girls' private
- Motto: Concordia Parvae Res Crescunt. (Small things grow in harmony)
- Established: 1888
- Local authority: Sefton
- Headmistress: Claire Tao
- Age: 11 to 18
- Enrolment: 511
- Website: http://www.merchanttaylors.com/

Merchant Taylors' Girls' School is a selective private girls' school in Great Crosby, Merseyside, England.

== History ==
Merchant Taylors' Girls' School was established in 1888, having inherited the buildings from the boys' school that had moved less than a mile away in 1874. The then governing body was dilatory in providing for the 'new' school and it was due to the insistence of James Fenning, the Master of the Worshipful Company of Merchant Taylors, that the girls' school was started.

At the School's opening all of the women staff were graduates. This was a feat, considering that at the time only four universities granted degrees to women. Latin was taught at the school from the beginning, as was mathematics. Early governors of the school insisted that the girls also learnt sewing and cooking.

In 1911 the adjoining house, "The Mulberries", was bought to add space. One of the buildings is the now Grade II-listed 1620s building (currently housing the library).

== Organisation ==
As of 2013, it has 511 pupils, ranging in age from 11 to 18. The school also has an associated prep school, Stanfield Mixed Infants and Junior Girls' School, which takes both boys aged 4–7 and girls aged 4 to 11. After attending the mixed infants school, the boys go on to the Junior section of Merchant Taylors' Boys' School, Crosby, less than a mile down the road.

The school is one of nine with links to the Worshipful Company of Merchant Taylors, including boys' school Merchant Taylors' School, Northwood and Merchant Taylors' Boys' School, Crosby. The school's motto is that of the Worshipful Company: Concordia Parvae Res Crescunt. (Small things grow in harmony.)

The school is independently run and charges tuition fees of £11,733 per year. Fees were partially subsidised by the Government under the Assisted Places Scheme until the closure of that scheme in 2001. The Schools now run their own means tested Assisted Places Scheme under which about 20% of pupils benefit from free, or reduced-fee places. The schools offer around £1 million a year in bursaries. About 17 per cent of pupils at the two senior schools receive assistance, worth up to 100 per cent of the annual fees.

It is a member of the Girls' Schools Association. Headmistress Mrs Louise Robinson was President of the Association in 2012.

In 2013, Merchant Taylors’ was Crosby's best performing school with 100% of pupils at the Girls’ school achieving five Cs or above in any subject at GCSE.

== Exchange programme ==
Merchant Taylors is partnered through the British Council's Connecting Classrooms Programme with Nelson Mandela High School, Sierra Leone. Since 2010, the schools have participated in exchange visits. The partnership has enabled Nelson Mandela High to become a 'Sustainable School'.

== Sport ==
=== Rowing ===
The school (along with the associated boys' school) runs the Merchant Taylors' School Boat Club which is affiliated to British Rowing (boat code MTS). The school competes in the British Rowing Championships. The junior under 14 double scull won the national title at the 2015 British Rowing Junior Championships and the junior under 15 double scull (composite with Trafford RC) won the national title at the 2016 British Rowing Junior Championships. The boat club has multiple pupils on the GB Rowing Pathway.

== Notable former pupils ==
- Beryl Bainbridge, novelist, was expelled
- Kelly Cates, television presenter
- Dame Jean Davies, Director of the Women's Royal Naval Service
- Dame Janet Finch, sociologist and Vice Chancellor of Keele University
- Jane Garvey, BBC radio presenter
- Clare Lilley, art curator
- Jennifer Johnston, mezzo-soprano
- Adele Roberts, Radio 1 and Radio 1 Xtra DJ
- Dr Julie Smith, politician
- Emma Watkinson, entrepreneur
- Eleanor Worthington Cox, actress

== See also ==
- Listed buildings in Great Crosby
