= Worshipful Company of Merchant Taylors =

Livery company of the City of London

Coordinates: 51.5141°N 0.0854°W

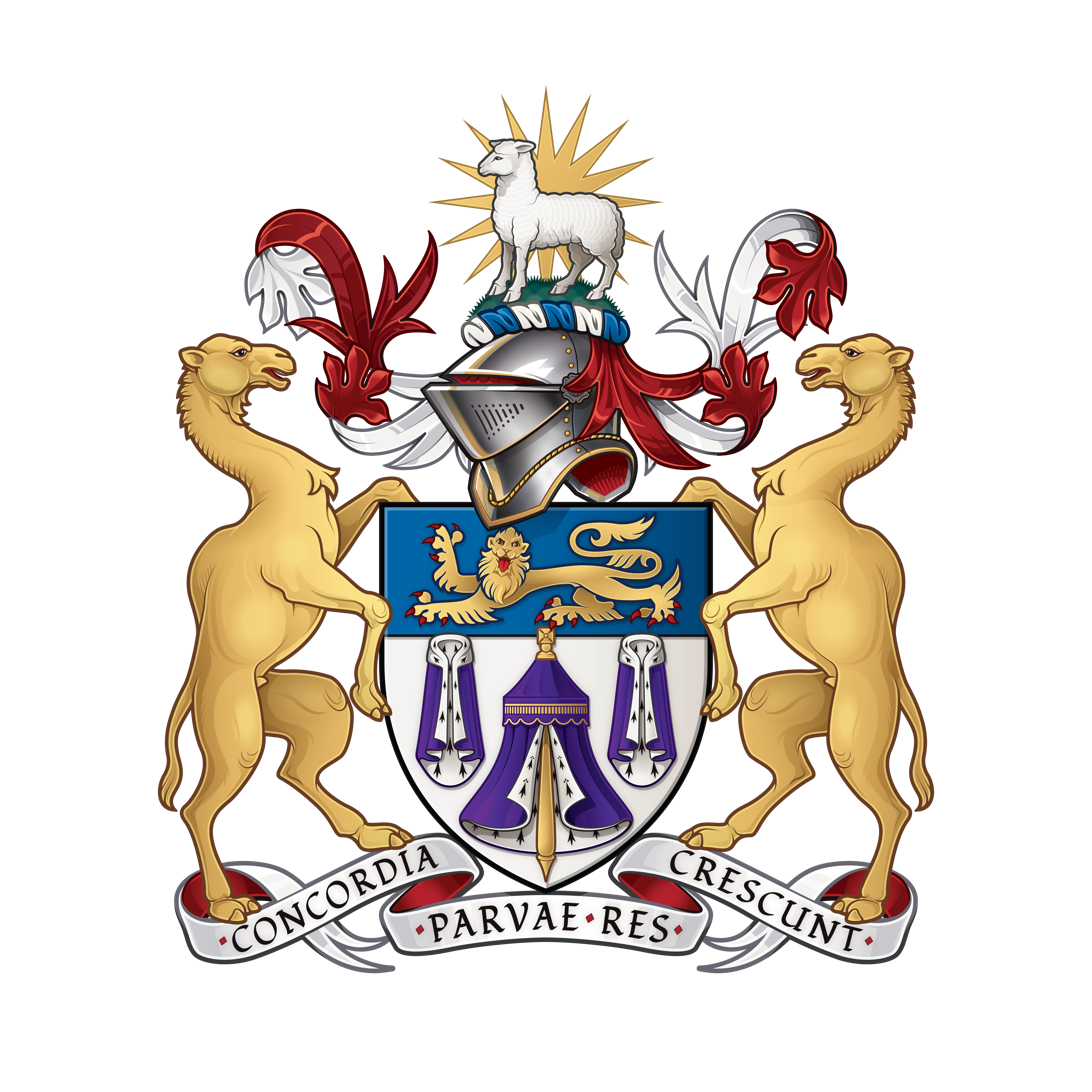
Arms of the Merchant Taylors' Company

The Worshipful Company of Merchant Taylors is one of the 114 livery companies of the City of London.

The Company, originally known as the Guild and Fraternity of St John the Baptist in the City of London, was founded prior to 1300, first incorporated under a royal charter in 1327, confirmed by later charters in 1408, 1503 and 1719.

Its seat is the Merchant Taylors' Hall between Threadneedle Street and Cornhill, a site it has occupied since at least 1347. The Company's motto is Concordia Parvae Res Crescunt, from the Roman historian Sallust meaning In Harmony Small Things Grow.

== History ==
The Company was at first an association of tailors. By the end of the 17th century, its connection with the tailoring trade had virtually ceased and it became what it is today, a philanthropic and social association – albeit that it has recently rekindled its links with Savile Row and is the principal sponsor and organiser of the prestigious biannual "Golden Shears" competition for aspiring young tailors.

It owns Merchant Taylors' School in Sandy Lodge and St John's Preparatory School in Northwood, both in Hertfordshire, and is associated with Merchant Taylors' School, Crosby, Merchant Taylors' Girls' School in Crosby, Wolverhampton Grammar School, Foyle College, Wallingford School, and The King's School, Macclesfield. It is also associated with St John's College, Oxford, founded by Sir Thomas White (a Master of the Company) in 1555, and with Pembroke College, Cambridge. It donates prizes to St. Helen's School in Northwood, which is considered its 'sister school', and supports an opera student at the Guildhall School of Music and Drama. It also supports Treloar School in Hampshire, a school and college for children with physical disabilities.

It has a major interest in charitable support for the elderly and isolated in Inner London, as well as for people living with disabilities. It is a major provider of almshouses in the London Borough of Lewisham and has plans to develop brand new accommodation for local elderly people.

== Ranking ==
Under an order issued by mayor Robert Billesden in 1484, the Company ranks in sixth or seventh place (making it one of the Great Twelve City Livery Companies) in the order of precedence of the Livery Companies, alternating with the Skinners' Company. The annual switch occurs at Easter. The Merchant Taylors are normally sixth in the order of precedence in odd numbered years, and at seven in even numbered years.

== Notable people ==
- William Fulwood (fl. 1562), author
- Bernard Weatherill (fl. circa. 1950), Speaker of the Commons
