= Air Cargo World =

Air Cargo Next
- Editor: Yael Katzwer and Courtney Blackann
- Frequency: Daily/Digital
- Format: Magazine
- Circulation: 24,000
- Publisher: Royal Media
- First issue: 1942
- Company: Royal Media Group
- Country: United States
- Based in: New York, NY
- Language: English
- Website: www.aircargonext.com
- ISSN: 0745-5100 (print); 1542-8591 (web)

Air Cargo Next, published in the United States, is an air cargo logistics magazine focused on the industry's digital transformation. The daily publication's subscribers include freight forwarders and air logistics professionals involved with the worldwide transport and delivery of perishables and manufactured goods.

The daily digital magazine’s editorial purpose is to provide data analysis, feature articles, and in-depth coverage of events and trends affecting the airfreight logistics industry. With more than 23,000 subscribers located in 184 countries, Air Cargo Next maintains the largest circulation of any magazine in the air cargo category.

Air Cargo Next conducts the annual Air Cargo Tech Summit.

The digital magazine, formerly known as Air Cargo World, also maintains a website with daily news items about developments in the air cargo industry. It publishes The Daily, which recounts major news and is emailed to more than 23,000 subscribers throughout the world. Each year, the magazine also publishes its Air Cargo Executive of the Year and Executives to Watch.

== History of Air Cargo Next ==
The first issue of Air Transportation, whose name was later changed to Air Cargo World, was published in 1942.

Air Transportation was founded in New York City in October 1942 by John F. Budd as the world's first air cargo magazine. The magazine was launched while America was in its tenth month of World War II, and the airfreight industry was in its infancy. A one-year subscription for the United States cost $5.

“Air Transportation is not anti-ship, anti-rail or anti-truck,” Budd wrote in his opening editorial. “It is pro-air, because it believes that, sooner or later, cargo-by-air will be a mighty force with which every shipper should, in his own interest, be familiar.”

The United States Department of War was relying on aircraft to deliver war supplies, but the long-term future of air cargo as an independent industry was in question.

“Despite the hostility air cargo would have to face after the war, the need for it would lift air cargo into its proper place as a serious and vital form of transportation,” Budd wrote in an early Air Transportation editorial.

Richard Malkin worked as an air cargo journalist for 60 years. He currently at 101 years of age works as contributing editor at Air Cargo News Flying Typers in New York.

Richard Malkin, the first full-time air cargo journalist, worked in the field for 60 years, writing for what was then Air Transportation in the 1940s. In 1949, Malkin traveled to Frankfurt, Germany to write a series of articles about the Berlin Airlift.

“Passenger people will disagree with me, but almost from the beginning, I recognized air cargo as the more glamorous and romantic side of the business,” Malkin wrote in the 2002 anniversary issue of Air Cargo World. “I spent the next six decades talking about getting out, yet never got around to doing it. Go figure.”

The magazine eventually changed its name to Air Cargo. In 1983, it became Air Cargo World.

In 2014, Air Cargo World was acquired by Royal Media Group, a New York-based information company.

In 2023, Royal Media rebranded the publication to Air Cargo Next.

== Air Cargo Excellence ==
The Air Cargo Excellence awards, known as the ACE Awards, are based on the Air Cargo Excellence Survey, which is carried out and published annually by Air Cargo Next. Established in 2005, the survey measures airlines and airports on specific criteria and ranks them to identify above or below average performance.

The survey also shows exactly how airlines and airports are performing against an industry average and specifically highlights areas in need of improvement.

== Past magazine titles ==
- Air Transportation (1942–1968)
- Air Cargo (1969)
- Cargo Airlift (1969–1976)
- Air Cargo (1977–1982)
- Air Cargo World (1983–2023)
- Air Cargo Next (2023)

== Past publishers ==
- John F. Budd
- Robert R. Parrish
- Martin B. Deutsch
- Richard L. Gower
- Susan Barbey
- John F. Gorsuch
- Steve Prince
- JJ Hornblass (present)

== Past editors ==
- John F. Budd
- Richard Malkin
- Martin B. Deutsch
- Robert N. Veres
- Marie Powers
- Linda Parham
- David I. Premo
- Nancy Gores
- Paul Page
- Simon Keeble
- Jon Ross
- John McCurry
- Randy Woods
- Caryn Livingston
- Ivan De Luce
- Yael Katzwer
