= Nelson Mandela High School, Canada =

Nelson Mandela High School

Location
- 45 Saddletowne Circle N.E. Calgary, Alberta, T3J 4W2; Canada; 51.121993°N 113.9467522°W

Information
- School type: Public secondary
- Established: 2016
- School board: Calgary Board of Education
- Principal: Matt Armstrong
- Grades: 10–12
- Enrollment: 1936 (2024)
- Communities served: Saddle Ridge, Taradale, Martindale
- Website: Website

Nelson Mandela High School is a high school in the city of Calgary. It accommodates approximately 1900 students in grades 10–12. The school is part of the Calgary Board of Education's public school system and is located in Saddle Ridge opening on September 6, 2016.

== History ==
The name of the school was chosen after gathering and evaluating input from parents, and community members, the school naming committee recommended this name to the board of trustees for its approval. The committee was composed of CBE Trustees, parent and/or community representatives, students and members of CBE administration.

== Academics ==
Nelson Mandela High School offers a variety of courses under the renowned Advanced Placement Program. These courses provide students the opportunity and knowledge to learn about and explore college-level course work, ultimately allowing students to prepare for post-secondary education. By taking the opportunity to understand and grasp college level content, and to display competence of the knowledge in AP exams, students can earn college credit. The AP courses offered at Nelson Mandela High School include a wide range of classes, such as art, biology, chemistry, computer science, design, english literature, mathematics, and social studies.

== Robotics ==
Nelson Mandela High School also houses one of the most accomplished robotics programs in the city. That team, FIRST Robotics team 7277, advanced to the FIRST Robotics Competition World Championships in both 2018 and 2019. They currently compete in the FIRST Technology Challenge program for robotics competition.

This schools clubs are almost completely student run to help the students learn how to lead a team.
