= Nelson Mandela High School, Sierra Leone =

High school in Waterloo, Sierra Leone

Information
- School type: Private high school
- Established: 2007; 19 years ago

Nelson Mandela High School is a high school based in Waterloo, in the Western Area Rural District, Sierra Leone. The school was established in 2007. Notwithstanding that this is a private school, many of the pupils are from very poor backgrounds.

== Exchange programme ==
Nelson Mandela High is partnered through the British Council's Connecting Classrooms Programme with Merchant Taylors' Girls' School in Crosby, Merseyside, England. Since 2010, the schools have participated in exchange visits. The partnership has enabled Nelson Mandela High to become a 'Sustainable School'.
