= Taradale, Calgary =

Taradale
- Neighbourhood
- Location of Taradale in Calgary
- Coordinates: 51°07′06″N 113°56′12″W
- Country: Canada
- Province: Alberta
- City: Calgary
- Quadrant: NE
- Ward: 3
- Established: 1984
- Annexed: 1961

Government
  - Mayor: Jeromy Farkas
  - Administrative body: Calgary City Council
  - Councillor: Andrew Yule (Independent)

Area
  - Total: 2.4 km^{2} (0.93 sq mi)
- Elevation: 1,100 m (3,600 ft)

Population (2006)
  - Total: 9,959
  - Average Income: $58,309
- Website: Taradale Community Association

Taradale is a residential neighbourhood in the northeast quadrant of Calgary, Alberta, Canada. It is located at the eastern edge of the city, and it is bounded to the north by Taradale Drive, to the east by 68 Street E, to the south by 64 Avenue N and to the west by Falconridge Boulevard.

The land was annexed to the City of Calgary in 1961, and Taradale was established in 1984. It is represented in the Calgary City Council by the Ward 3 councillor. Taradale is reportedly named after one of the community's developers children: Martin and Tara.

== Demographics ==
In the City of Calgary's 2012 municipal census, Taradale had a population of 16,841 living in 4,559 dwellings, a 4.5% increase from its 2011 population of 16,110. With a land area of 2.9 km^{2} (1.1 sq mi), it had a population density of 5,810/km^{2} (15,040/sq mi) in 2012. Taradale is home to a large South Asian population, mainly Indians and Pakistanis, with a small Afghan community. There is also a Filipino population.

Residents in this community had a median household income of $58,309 in 2000, and there were 13.4% low income residents living in the neighbourhood. As of 2000, 27.8% of the residents were immigrants. All buildings were single-family detached homes, and 10.4% of the housing was used for renting.

== Crime ==
Taradale is a low-crime community, with it being among the safest in the city of Calgary.

Crime Data
Year	Crime Rate (/100)
2018	1.7
2019	1.5
2020	1.5
2021	1.7
2022	1.3
2023	1.0

== Education ==
Public schools in Taradale include Taradale Elementary School and Ted Harrison Middle School.

== See also ==
- List of neighbourhoods in Calgary
