= 2013 Alberta floods =

2013 natural disaster in southern Alberta, Canada

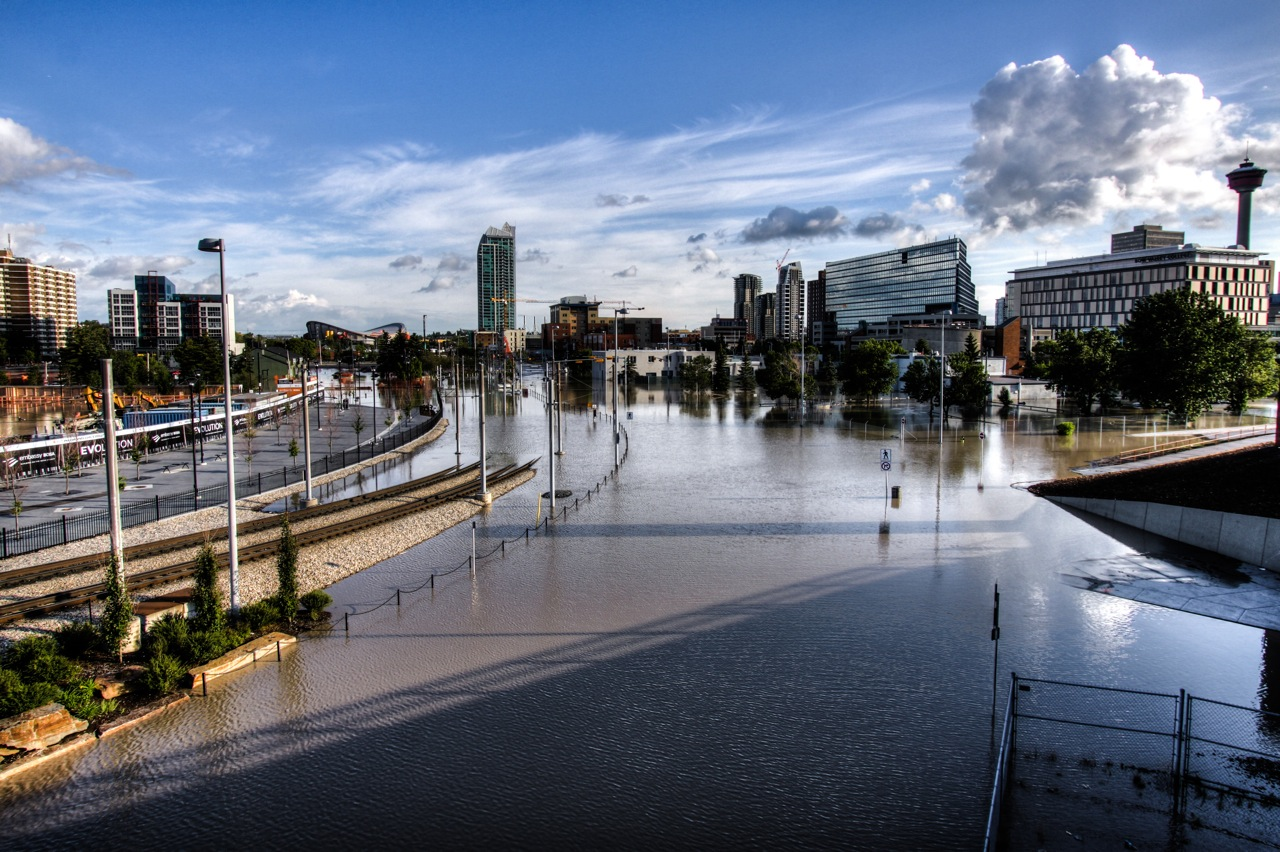
- The Downtown East Village neighbourhood of Calgary, Alberta, during the 2013 Alberta floods (June 21, 2013)
- Date: June 19 – July 12, 2013
- Location: Southern and central Alberta: Communities Banff, M.D. of Bighorn No. 8 (Benchlands, Dead Man's Flats, Exshaw, Harvie Heights and Lac des Arcs), Black Diamond, Calgary, Canmore, Cochrane, Crowsnest Pass, Cypress County, Devon, Drumheller, M.D. of Foothills No. 31, Fort Macleod, High River, Kananaskis I.D., Lethbridge, Lethbridge County, Medicine Hat, Mountain View County, M.D. of Pincher Creek No. 9, M.D. of Ranchland No. 66, Okotoks, Red Deer, Red Deer County, Redcliff, Redwood Meadows, Rocky View County (Bragg Creek), Siksika Nation, Stoney Nation (Morley), Sundre, Tsuu T'ina Nation, Turner Valley, Vulcan County and M.D. of Willow Creek No. 26
- Deaths: 5
- Property damage: $5 billion (Estimated) ($6.67 billion in 2025 dollars)

In the days leading up to June 19, 2013, parts of southern and central Alberta, Canada experienced heavy rainfall that triggered catastrophic flooding described by the provincial government as the worst in Alberta's history. Areas along the Bow, Elbow, Highwood, Red Deer, Sheep, Little Bow, and South Saskatchewan rivers and their tributaries were particularly affected. A total of 32 states of local emergency were declared and 28 emergency operations centres were activated as water levels rose and numerous communities were placed under evacuation orders.

Five people were confirmed dead as a direct result of the flooding and over 100,000 people were displaced throughout the region. Some 2,200 Canadian Armed Forces (CAF) troops were deployed to help in flooded areas in addition to the Royal Canadian Mounted Police and Alberta Sheriffs Branch response. Total damage estimates exceeded CA$5 billion and in terms of insurable damages, made the 2013 Alberta floods the costliest disaster in Canadian history at $1.7 billion, until the occurrence of the 2016 Fort McMurray wildfire. Receding waters gave way to a mammoth cleanup of affected areas, aided by a spontaneous volunteer campaign in which many homeowners were assisted by complete strangers.

== Meteorology ==
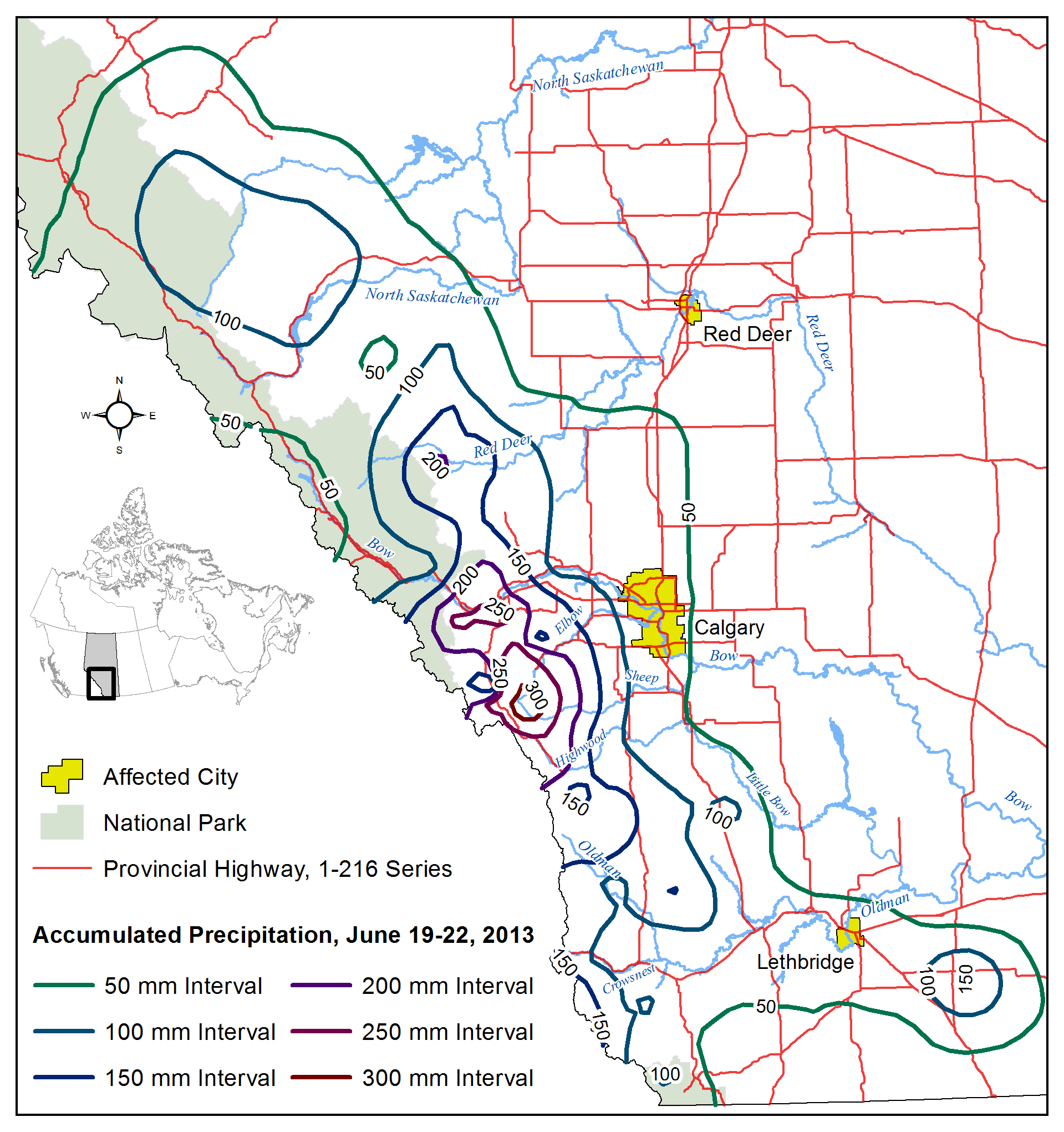
Accumulated precipitation contours showing the June 19–22, 2013 rainfall event within Alberta's Rockies and the foothills that triggered the flooding

Situated east of the Canadian Rockies, southern Alberta is a semi-arid region that does not usually receive high amounts of rainfall. Late June 2013, a high-pressure system in northern Alberta blocked the passage to a low-pressure area to the south. This blocked circulation and easterly winds pumped humidity on the rising slopes of the Rocky Mountains foothills, causing heavy rain to fall on the province with rainfall amounts of over 200 millimetres (7.9 in) in less than two days in many regions of the province, particularly west and southwest of Calgary. In Canmore, a town in Alberta's Rockies, over 220 millimetres (8.7 in) fell in just 36 hours between 19 and 21 June, nearly half of the town's annual average rainfall. In the town of High River, rainfall amounts at one weather station recorded 325 millimetres (12.8 in) in less than 48 hours. The rain falling on already saturated ground, coupled with the steep watershed and heavy snow loads remaining in the front ranges of the Rocky Mountains, resulted in a rapid increase in the size and flow of several rivers.

At the peak of the flooding, the Bow and Elbow rivers were flowing through Calgary at three times their peak levels from a 2005 flood that caused CA$400 million in damages. Within 48 hours, by 8 a.m. MDT on June 21, the flow rate on the Bow River had reached 1,458 cubic metres (51,489 cubic ft.) per second (m^{3}/s), five times its normal rate for this time of the year. The Elbow and Highwood rivers reached flow rates of 544 m^{3}/s (inside Calgary) and 734 m^{3}/s respectively, ten times their averages for this time of year. According to data tracked by Alberta's Ministry of Environment and Sustainable Resource Development, (Note: Premier Redford created the Environment and Sustainable Resource Development (ESRB) formerly known as the Ministry of Environment and Water on May 8, 2012.) "in the space of a day or two, the flows of the three rivers rocketed up five to 10 times their normal rates."

== Impact ==
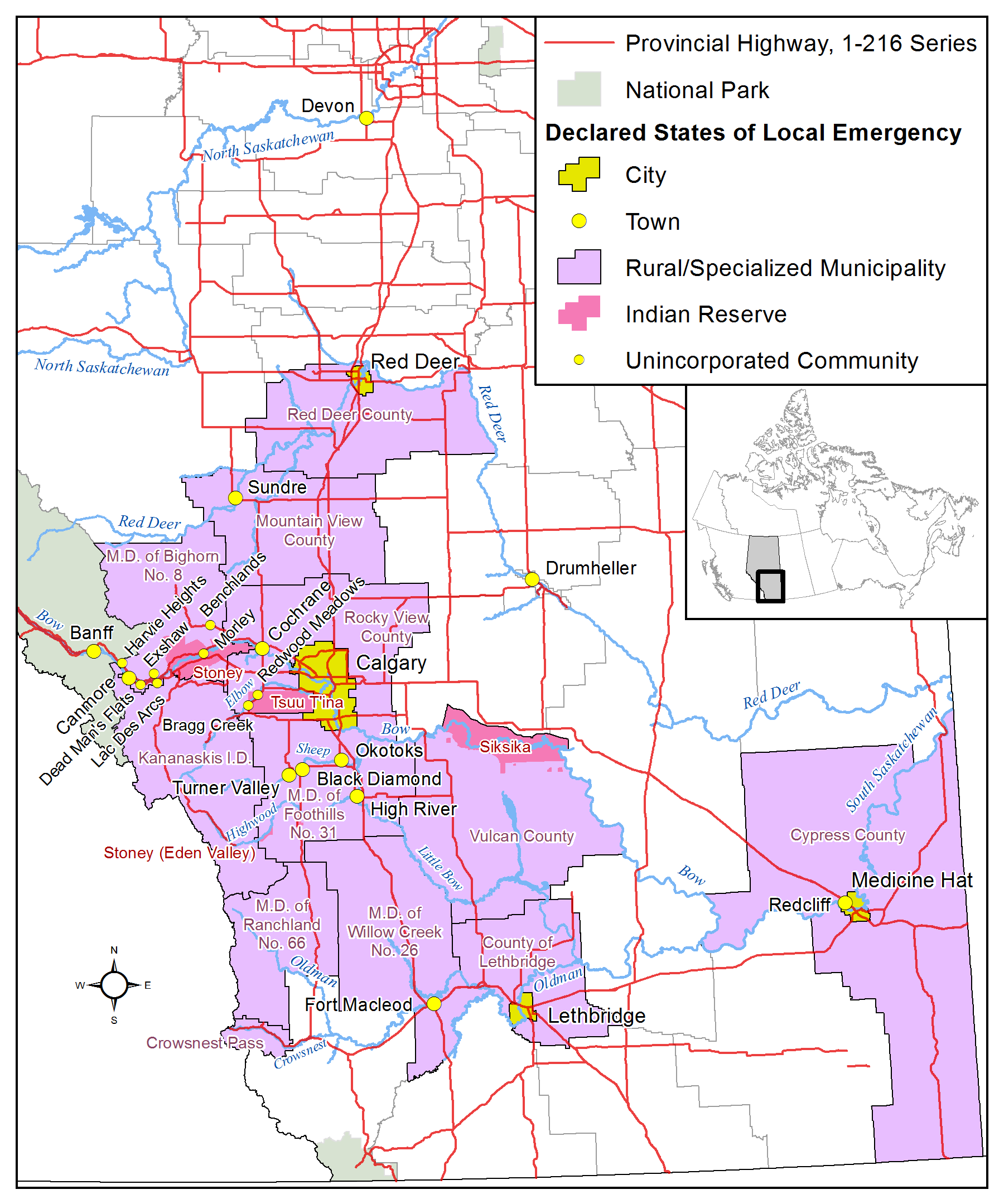
A total of 32 local governments in southern and central Alberta declared states of local emergency as a result of the flooding.

Government officials called the flooding the worst in Alberta's history.

By June 24, 2013, some 2,200 Canadian Forces (CF) troops had been deployed to help in flooded areas. Land Force Western Area brought in Coyote reconnaissance vehicles, Bison armoured vehicles, G-Wagen Jeeps, and other military vehicles.

As communities began to flood and people became displaced, area residents mobilized to offer support and assistance to evacuees and emergency response personnel. Some volunteers and several police officers worked up to 20 hours to help evacuation efforts despite knowing their own homes had been damaged or completely washed away. While coverage of the flooding spread throughout social media sites, many people and businesses also took to Facebook and Twitter to open their homes up to neighbours and strangers who did not have other places to stay or offer whatever support they could.

=== Calgary ===
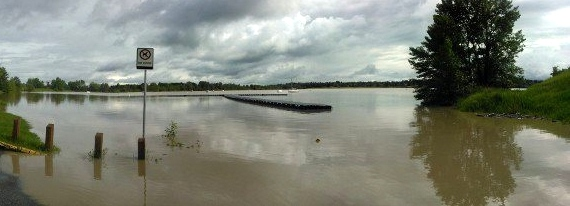
The flooded Glenmore Reservoir in Calgary, on June 21, 2013

In Calgary, Alberta's largest city, 26 neighbourhoods (Note: Affected neighbourhoods included Beltline, Bonnybrook, Bowness, Bridgeland Industrial Area, Chinatown/Eau Claire, Cliff Bungalow, Deer Run, Discovery Ridge, Douglasdale, Downtown/East Village, Elbow Park, Erlton, Inglewood, Hillhurst, Mission, Montgomery, Quarry Park, Rideau Park, Riverbend, Riverdale, Roxboro, Stanley Park/Elboya, Sunnyside, Victoria Park, Westmount and Windsor Park) in the vicinity of the Bow and Elbow rivers were placed under a mandatory evacuation order on June 20 and 21 as the rivers spilled over their banks and flooded communities. Affecting 75,000 people, it was the largest evacuation order in the city's history. The city's downtown core was among the areas evacuated, as officials called for a "Neighbour Day" on June 21 and requested people to stay home, particularly the 350,000 people who work downtown. All schools in both the public and Catholic school districts were closed and officials urged residents to avoid unnecessary travel.

On June 21, the Bow River had reached a record high water level of 4.09 m (13.4 ft). That same day, the river also reached a record high flow rate of 1,750 m^{3}/s (62,000 cu ft/s).

Through social media, (Note: A highly detailed Google Map was updated to include neighbourhoods under mandatory evacuation and to show information such as the hydrology of the Bow and Elbow River systems.) websites and blogs (Note: The City of Calgary constantly updated their blog.) with updated contributions from the Calgary's mayor, (Note: Mayor Nenshi is well known for his effective use of social media.) numerous city councillors, (Note: The City of Calgary's Facebook account was also widely used.) the Calgary Police, media at all levels, and numerous Calgarians with Twitter, (Note: Twitter hashtags included #yycflood, #abflood.) Flickr and Facebook accounts, the flood was well-covered. (Note: While the Calgary Police's Twitter account was locked when it reached its daily limit, this was temporary and there were numerous other options.)

The city's largest indoor arena, the Scotiabank Saddledome, was among the facilities damaged as flood waters were reported to have filled up to the first ten rows of the lower seating bowl. The Calgary Stampede grounds adjacent to the arena were also severely flooded, less than two weeks before the scheduled opening of the annual exhibition and rodeo, however officials vowed the event would go on.

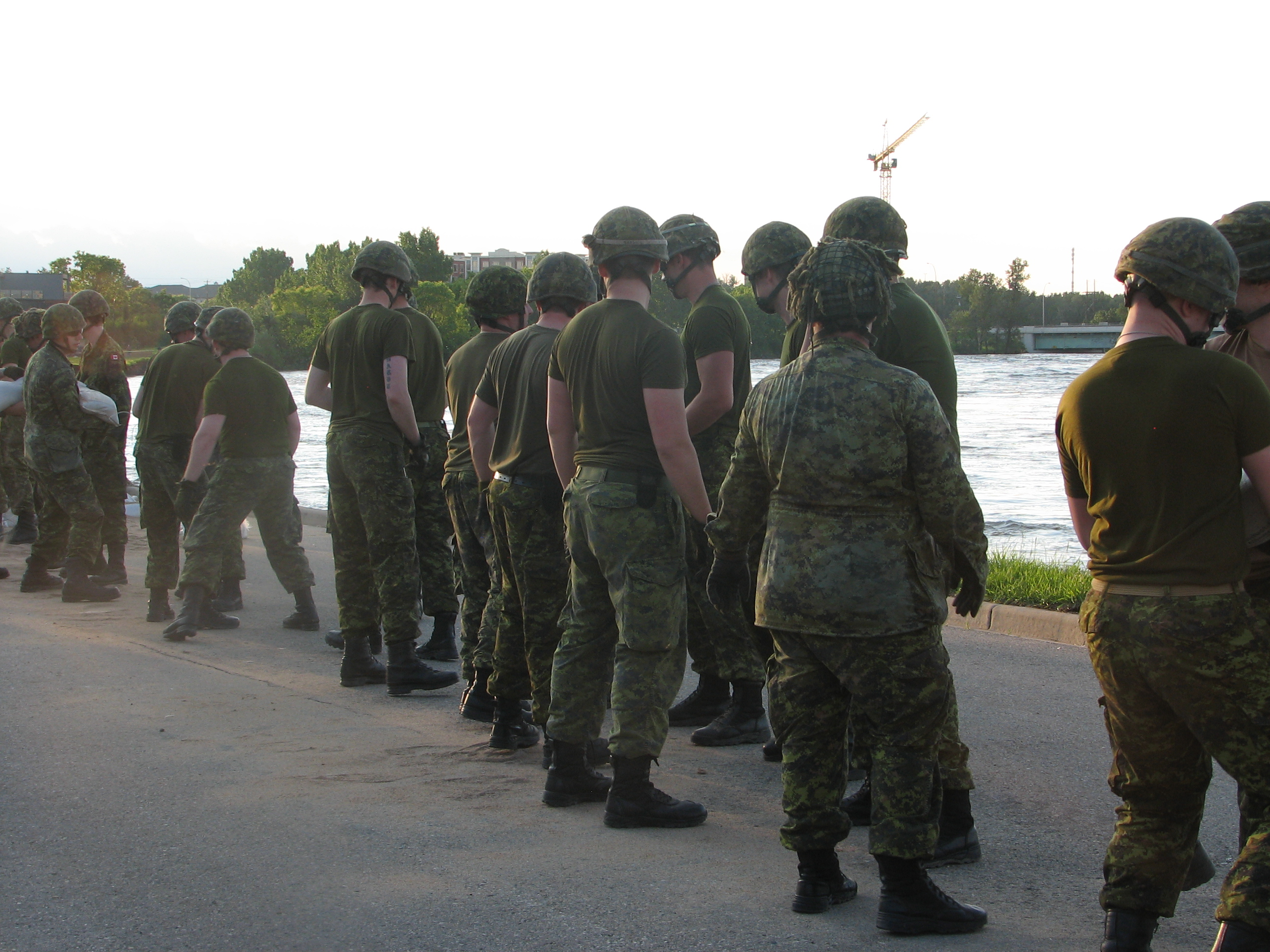
The Calgary Highlanders assisting city workers in flood relief in the community of Inglewood (June 22, 2013)

While emergency officials began to announce the partial lifting of some evacuation orders on June 22, Mayor Naheed Nenshi stated that it would be several days before power could be restored to the downtown core. City workers, assisted by Canadian Forces personnel from The Calgary Highlanders, reinforced a particularly large erosion of river bank near 8th Avenue S.E., which endangered several houses in the neighbourhood of Inglewood.

Calgary's central business district, home to many of Canada's oil company headquarters, remained inaccessible until June 26. A spokesman for Imperial Oil, Canada's second-largest producer and refiner, said the company was working on plans to maintain essential operations, including allowing employees to work from other locations. Shorcan Energy Brokers, which provides live prices for many Canadian crude grades, operated out of Toronto on June 21 rather than at its usual Calgary base, although no trades in either Western Canada Select heavy blend or light synthetic crude from the oil sands were executed. Net Energy Inc, the other main Calgary crude broker, was closed on Friday, June 21, and there was no trading.

As the water began to recede, the city lifted evacuation orders for several communities. It allowed 65,000 residents to return to their homes and business on June 23 to assess for damage, but parts of 14 communities remained off-limits.

On June 27, the Bonnybrook Bridge collapsed under the weight of a Canadian Pacific Railway freight train. One of the pilings of the 101-year-old rail bridge had been scoured by floodwaters on the Bow River and undermined. CPR officials said that because the scour occurred underwater, they had not been able to inspect it, due to river conditions. However, rail regulations require the ability to inspect underwater. The buckled bridge caused the train to derail. As the train was carrying hazardous petrochemicals, an evacuation was ordered for the local area and regions downstream, and the train was slowly pumped dry.

=== High River ===
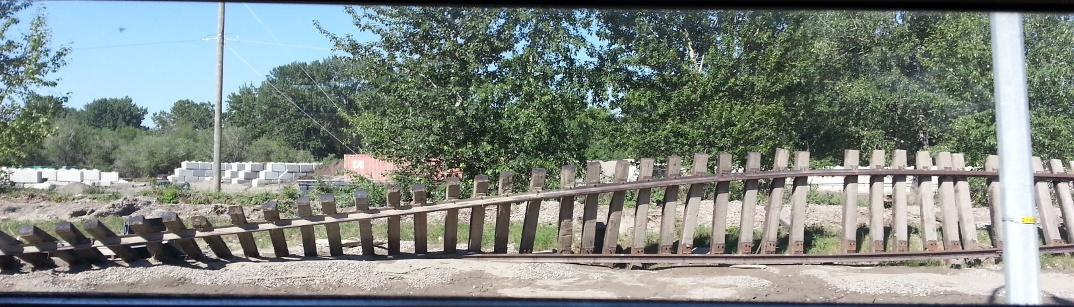
Damaged rail tracks in High River

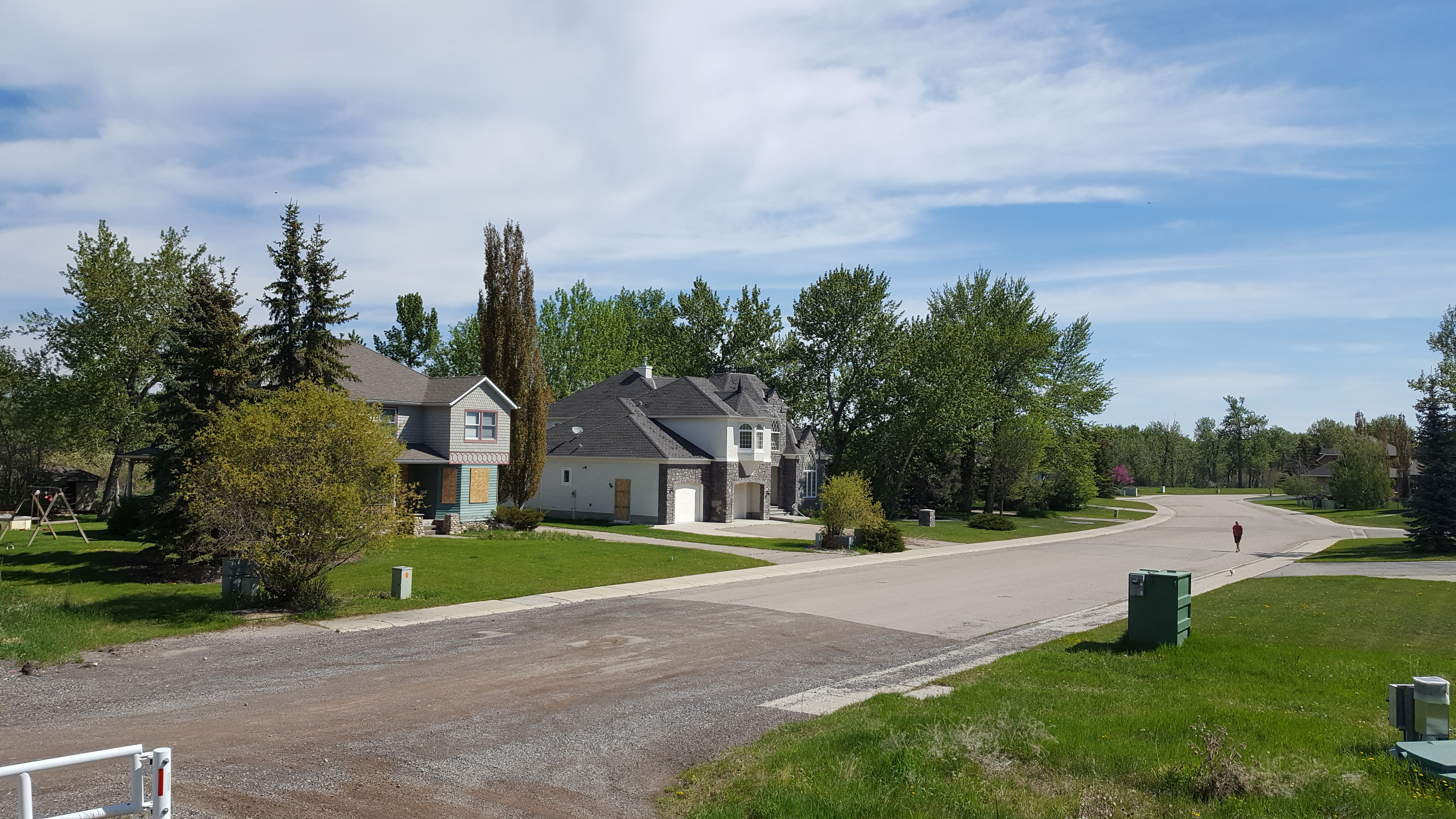
Abandoned homes - due to 2013 flood - in High River, Alberta (1600 Macleod Trail) - slated to be moved.

South west of Calgary, the town of High River was evacuated after flooding of the Highwood River caused water to rise over the top of vehicles in the town's main streets and necessitated the rescue of over 150 people from the rooftops of their homes. 350 Canadian Forces personnel and 80 Royal Canadian Mounted Police officers were dispatched to assist with rescue efforts. Members of the Alberta Sheriffs Branch were also involved in this effort. All 13,000 residents of High River were ordered to evacuate on June 20, and the community was largely abandoned within three days as the town suffered what local officials called "unprecedented" damage. Among internationally recognized sites flooded in High River was the "Maggie's Diner" standing set for the Canadian Broadcasting Corporation (CBC) series Heartland.

During the state of emergency in High River, the RCMP entered numerous homes in the area and seized hundreds of firearms, along with magazines and ammunition. Although the RCMP claimed that it only seized firearms that were in plain view, many residents have complained that their firearms were well hidden, and that the RCMP caused significant damage inside homes while searching for firearms. There are further complaints that RCMP members subjected homes to second or even third searches in their quest for firearms in plain view. The Commission for Public Complaints Against the RCMP concluded that the RCMP had exceeded its authority by seizing firearms that were properly secured or not in plain view, by not keeping proper records of the damage caused when they broke into homes, and by failing to report the seizure of firearms to a justice of the peace. The report concluded that, although they were not legally required to do so, communicating adequately with the public during the crisis would have prevented much confusion among partners and anger among residents.

While residents of other communities were returning and beginning their cleanup, High River remained off limits a week after the flooding first hit. Residents grew increasingly frustrated at what they perceived as a lack of communication from local officials, particularly the lack of a timeline to return. Officials argued the town remained unsafe; some residences remained accessible only to divers, while E. coli had been discovered in the water.

The neighbourhood of Beechwood estates, with many luxury homes worth over a million dollars, was among those hard hit by the flood. The Province of Alberta decided to purchase 94 homes in designated floodways (including the 32 in Beechwood), demolish most of them and return the area to its natural state as a floodplain. Twenty-six of the houses were auctioned off for relocation.

=== Southern Alberta ===
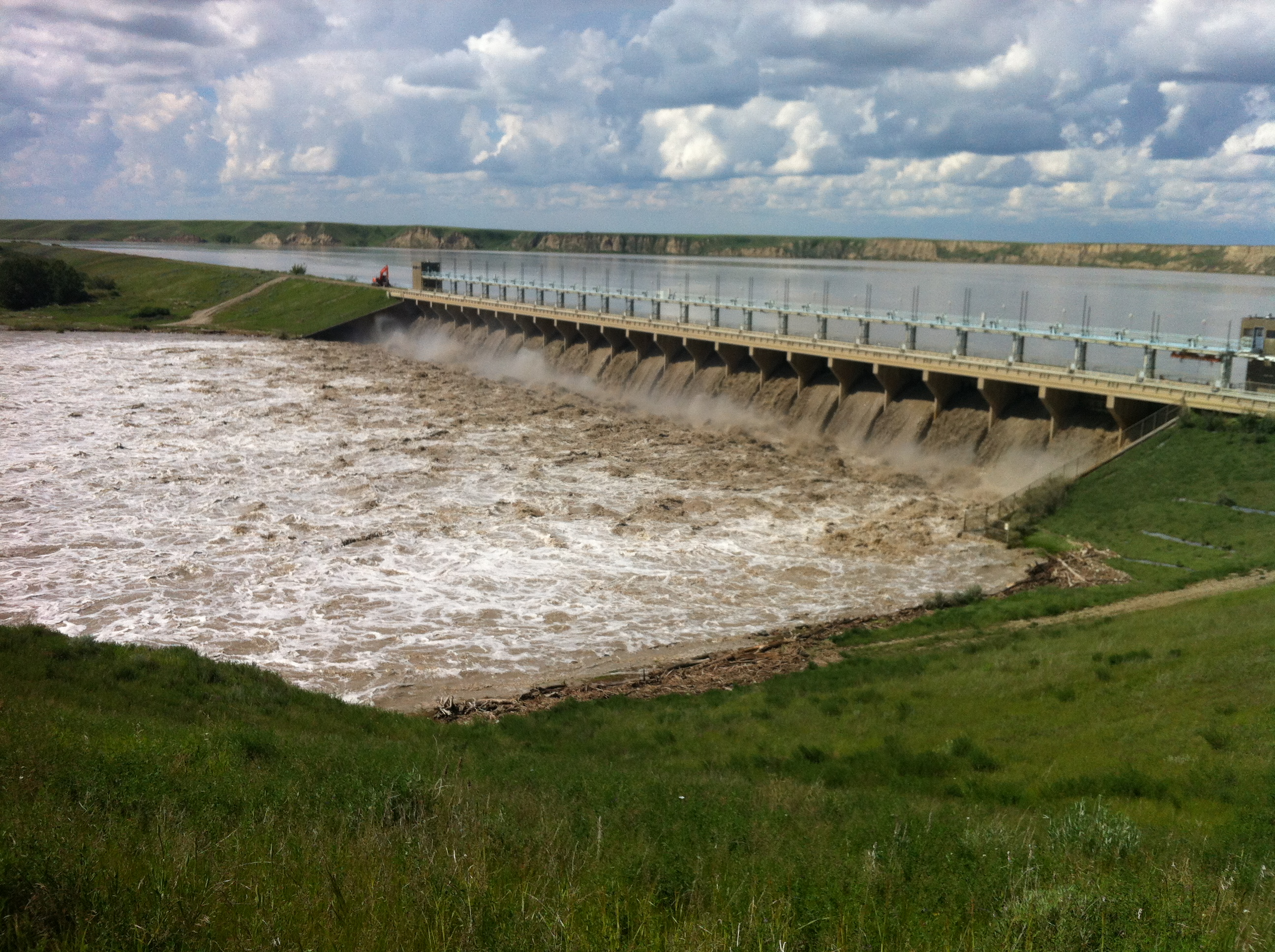
Bassano Dam on June 23, 2013

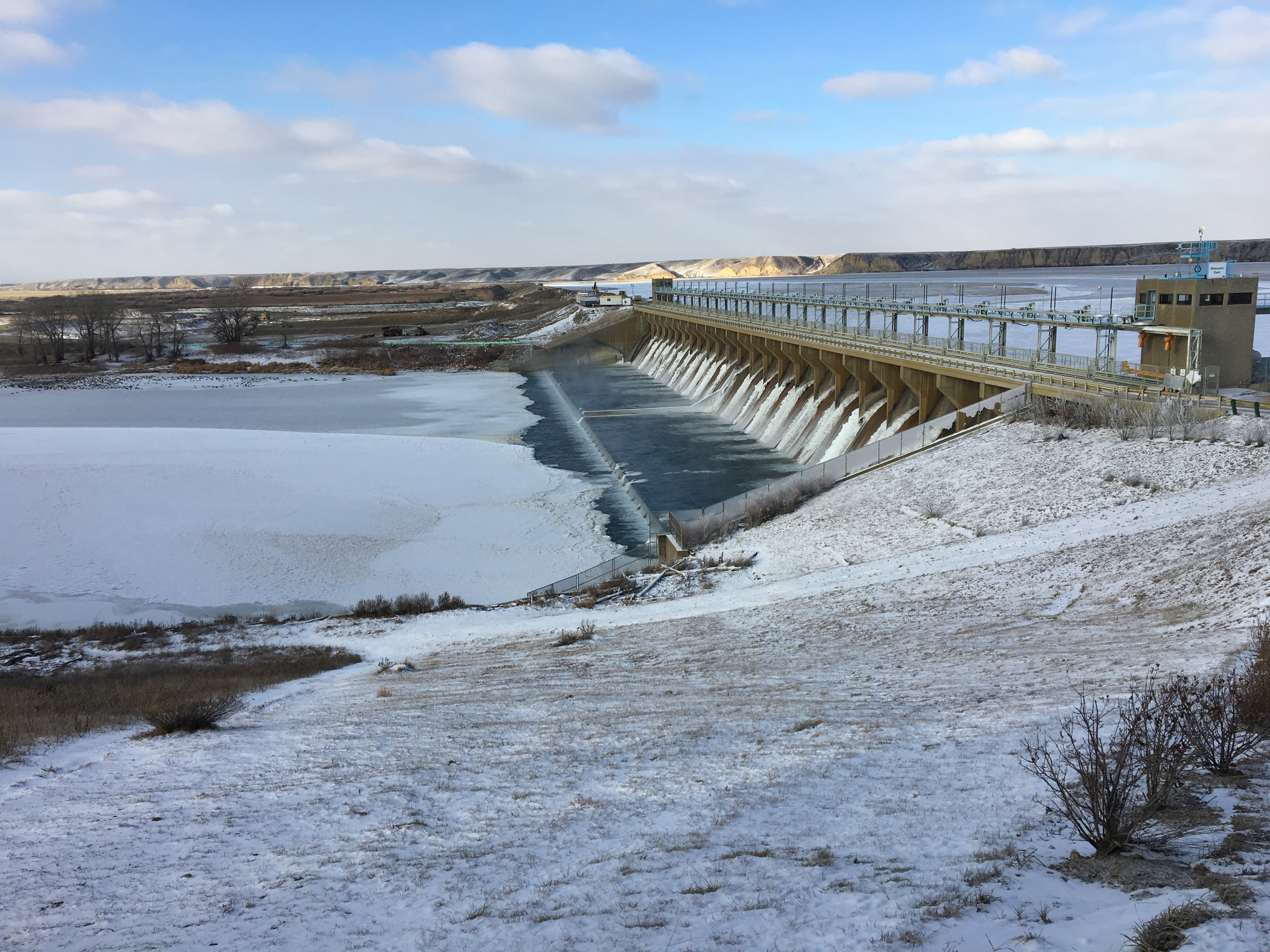
Bassano Dam on Dec 8, 2016 for comparison, during construction of the new emergency spillway

The mountain towns of Banff and Canmore, west of Calgary, were cut off from neighbouring communities after flooding and mudslides forced the closure of the Trans-Canada Highway. Several homes were swept away in Canmore by the rise of Cougar Creek.

In addition to Calgary, High River and Canmore, nine other municipalities, including the City of Lethbridge; the towns of Black Diamond, Cochrane, Sundre and Turner Valley; the Municipality of Crowsnest Pass; Rocky View County; and the municipal districts of Bighorn No. 8, Pincher Creek No. 9 and Foothills No. 31, had declared states of emergency on June 20 due to flooding and some communities had evacuated residents. Additionally, the City of Red Deer declared a state of emergency over the potential of flooding ahead of a planned release of water from the Dickson Dam into the Red Deer River. Another dozen communities have declared a state of emergency on June 21, including several First Nation reserves; the Siksika First Nation, east of Calgary evacuated 1,000 residents.

The city of Medicine Hat, on the South Saskatchewan River downstream from the confluence of the Bow and Oldman rivers was also hit with significant flooding. The city evacuated 10,000 residents ahead of the flooding, and facilities including the Medicine Hat Arena had begun to flood late Sunday evening, June 23. The South Saskatchewan River peaked at 5,460m^{3}/s, which was below earlier predictions of 6,000m^{3}/s, but exceeded the highest recorded rate of 5,100m^{3}/s in 1995.

=== Saskatchewan and Manitoba ===
Officials in the neighbouring provinces of Saskatchewan and Manitoba were bracing for potential flooding along the South Saskatchewan and Saskatchewan rivers, into which many of the affected rivers in Alberta drain. The South Saskatchewan River reached record levels through Saskatoon, but the city did not experience significant flooding. 2,200 people were evacuated from the Cumberland House area in eastern Saskatchewan. In Manitoba, flood warnings were issued for The Pas.

== Fatalities ==
Four people are confirmed to have died as direct result of the flooding. Three people drowned in the Highwood River near High River, while an elderly woman drowned in her ground-floor apartment in Calgary's Mission neighbourhood. Additionally, Okotoks resident Robert David Nelson was killed in an ATV rollover while checking a neighbour's home for flood damage.

== Cleanup and recovery ==
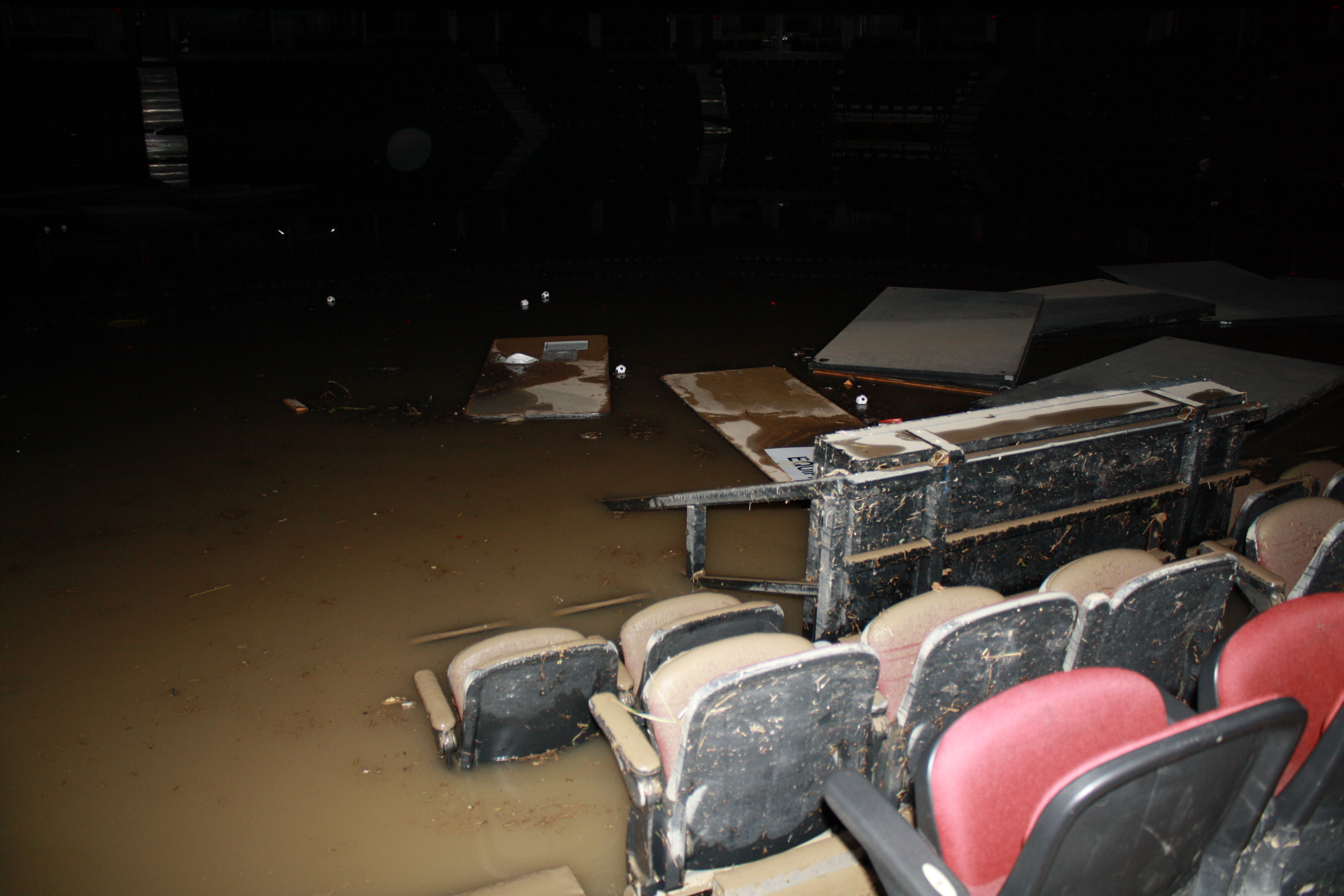
Flooding of Scotiabank Saddledome was extensive, however the Calgary Flames were able to repair the arena in time for the start of the 2013–14 NHL season.

=== Estimated costs ===
On June 24, 2013, although total damage caused by the flooding remained unknown, Alberta Premier Alison Redford, predicted it would surpass the $700 million caused by the Slave Lake fire, with much of the cost likely to be uninsurable. In a report issued on June 24, 2013, Tom MacKinnon, BMO Capital Markets insurance analyst, suggested an early estimate of between $3 billion and $5 billion of total damages to "homes, businesses, vehicles and other private property." That would be "20 to 30 times" the amount of damage caused by southern Alberta's 2005 major flood, and the second costliest natural disaster in Canadian history. The Province of Alberta estimated in August that the cost of repairing the damage would exceed $5 billion. The Insurance Bureau of Canada stated in September that insurable losses had exceeded $1.7 billion, making it the costliest disaster in Canadian history in terms of insured damages (and without accounting for inflation), surpassing the $1.6 billion cost of the North American Ice Storm of 1998. The bureau called the cost "staggering", and said the figure continued to rise.

The Albertan government granted the Siksika nation $93M to rebuild their communities; $10M of this grant would be used to train and upgrade the vocational skills needed to perform construction repairs.

=== Municipal level ===
Alberta's Minister of Municipal Affairs, Doug Griffiths, announced on June 21, 2013, that a task force that represents numerous government agencies and which earned praise for its coordination of recovery efforts following the 2011 Slave Lake wildfire would be reconvened. John McGowan, CEO of the Alberta Urban Municipalities Association (AUMA) described how AMSC is applying what they learned from the $700-million clean-up process following the Slave Lake fire in 2011 in their response to the flood. McGowan explained how the AUMA's subsidiary Alberta Municipal Services Corporation (AMSC) will provide a wide variety of services which include general insurance to the approximately 278 cities, towns and villages in Alberta affected by the flood. Damaged public buildings, vehicles and key public infrastructure, including subsidiary damage such as, structural damage to bridges or tunnels, need to be repaired or replaced in the "biggest cleanup in provincial history". "Neighbours, strangers, friends, and friends-of-friends-of-friends" helped those whose homes were damaged in Calgary's flood. Calgary's first official call, early on the morning of June 24, for 600 volunteers resulted in an estimated 2,500 people arriving ready to work. Calgary Emergency Management Agency director Bruce Burrell said that the City of Calgary hired contractors on larger infrastructure repairs but volunteers were needed.

=== Provincial level ===
Upon touring the affected areas, Alberta Premier Alison Redford who represents the Calgary-Elbow riding, promised provincial assistance in recovery efforts. The Alberta Treasury board met early on June 24 to approve a preliminary $1 billion emergency fund for the disaster recovery program, covering immediate clean-up and repair costs. Losses to homeowners and municipalities caused by overland flooding, not covered by regular insurance, will be covered by the province. While making the funding announcement Premier Redford cautioned that it could take up to ten years to fully recover from the disaster.

=== Federal level ===
Prince William and his wife sent on June 24, via the Canadian Secretary to the Queen, a message of support, expressing their "best wishes to the Lieutenant Governor and Premier of Alberta and to the brave emergency services and all those volunteering to help their neighbours during this ongoing period of intense efforts." His father, then Prince Charles also, following the destruction of Lac-Mégantic, Quebec, on July 8, issued a statement mentioning both that disaster and the Alberta floods, saying "this has been a most testing time for Canadians" and praising the "extraordinary efforts which have led to the Calgary Stampede being opened on time" as demonstration that "it is only too clear how courageous and resourceful Canadians are, and we have nothing but the greatest admiration for such determination and resilience in the face of terrible adversity." Prime Minister Stephen Harper, who also represents the Calgary Southwest riding, toured the flooded area and promised federal assistance in recovery efforts. Harper, Redford and Calgary Mayor Naheed Nenshi took a helicopter tour of flood-damaged areas on the afternoon of June 21, and discussed the trilateral co-operation to the flood response.

It was announced in 2013 that $2 billion was earmarked from the government's Disaster Financial Assistance Arrangements for the province and that the government was seeking a $689-million increase in funding for the program from parliament.

=== First Nations ===
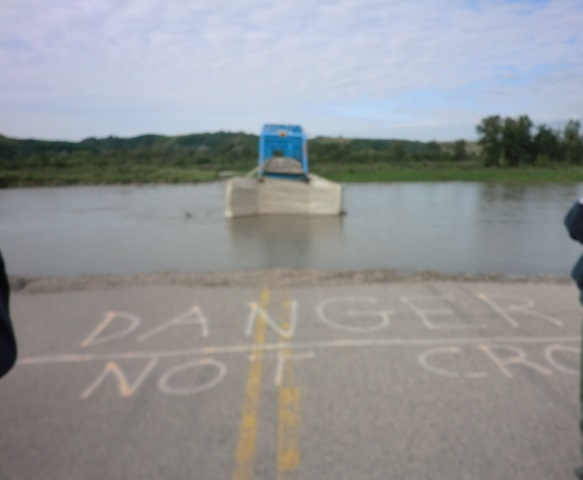
Washed out bridge that spanned the Bow River within the Siksika Nation, photo taken from the blocked and guarded side of the bridge accessible only to Samaritan Purse volunteers (June 9, 2013)

A state of emergency for Siksika First Nation, east of Calgary, was declared in the evening of June 20 with approximately one thousand people evacuated from their homes. By June 23, with 200 homes still underwater, Chief Fred Rabbitcarrier told CTV that there was a "feeling of hopelessness." However, as news outlets began to cover the story and a Facebook account, set-up using a cellphone, helped coordinate relief efforts, donations and volunteers have responded to the community's call for help.

=== Volunteering ===
Soon after the flood started to recede, volunteer efforts began to help clean up the aftermath of the flood in Calgary. Thousands of people descended on heavily hit areas to help neighbours and strangers clean up in the aftermath. Buses were organized to transport volunteers into High River, where the majority of residents were expected to require assistance.

=== Flood mitigation ===
In November 2013, the Government of Alberta announced various projects to mitigate future flooding within Calgary and High River. The projects include construction of a channel to divert water around High River and a dry dam for the Elbow River west of Bragg Creek, which is upstream of Calgary. A grant was also announced for Calgary to investigate construction of a 5 km (3.1 mi) tunnel to divert Elbow River flood waters away from neighbourhoods.

== Gallery ==
=== Flooding in Calgary ===
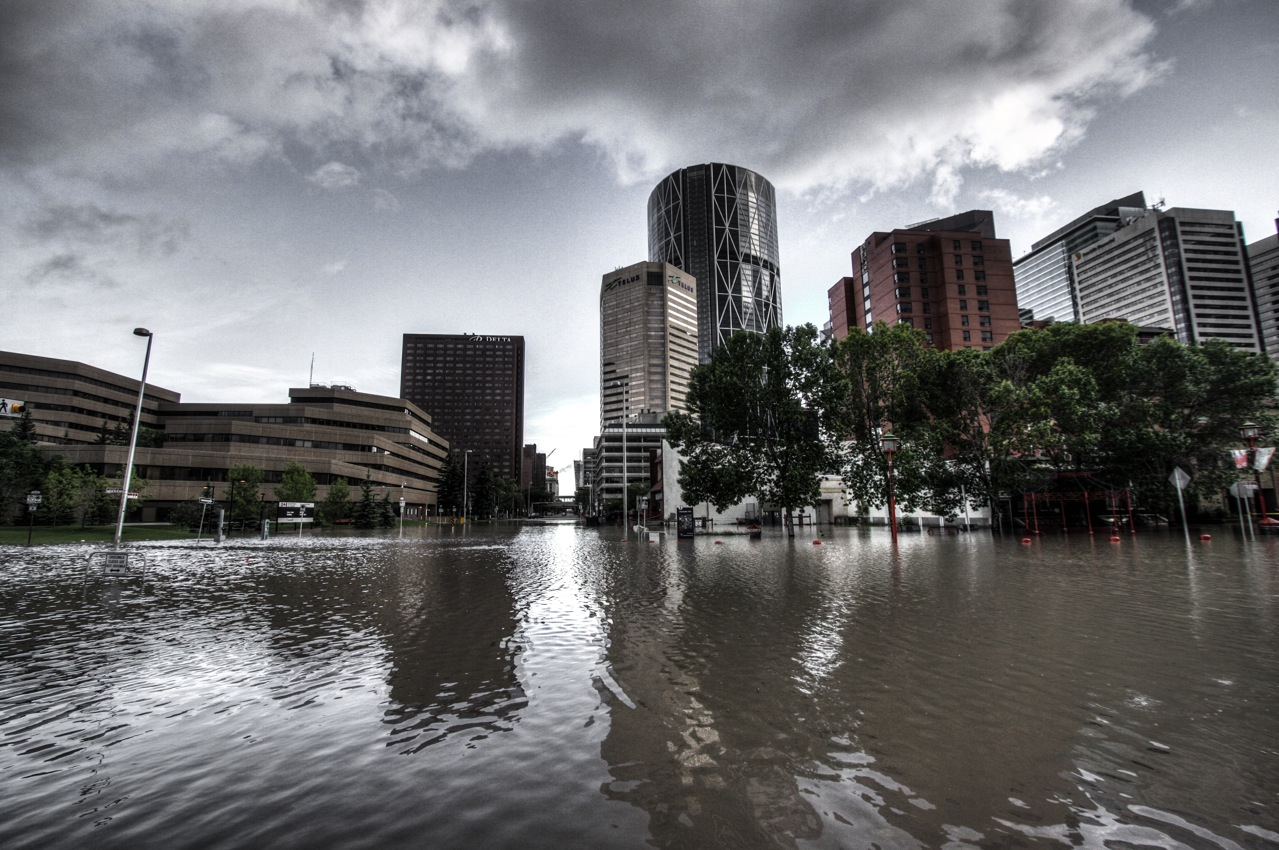
Looking toward Downtown Calgary from Riverfront Avenue during the 2013 Alberta floods (June 21, 2013)

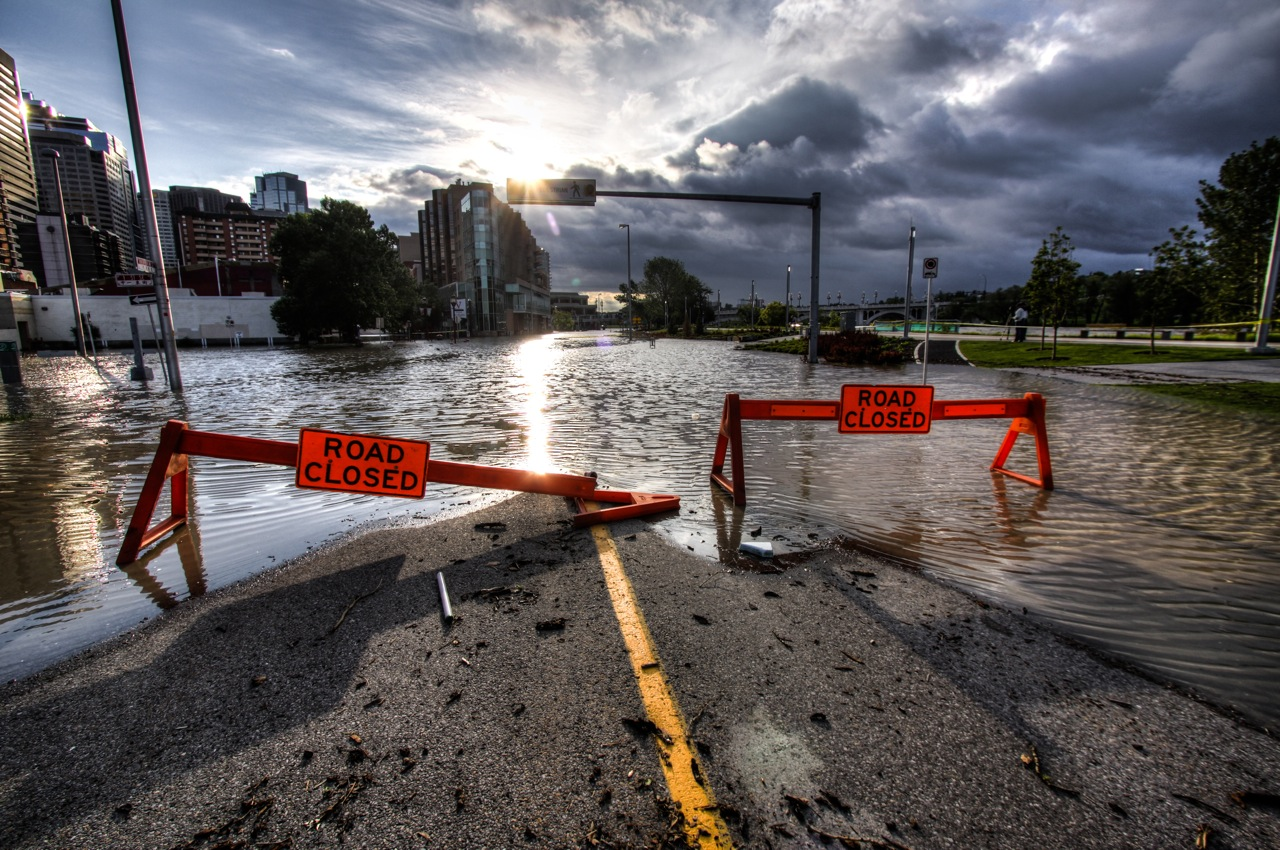
Riverfront Avenue in Calgary (June 21, 2013).

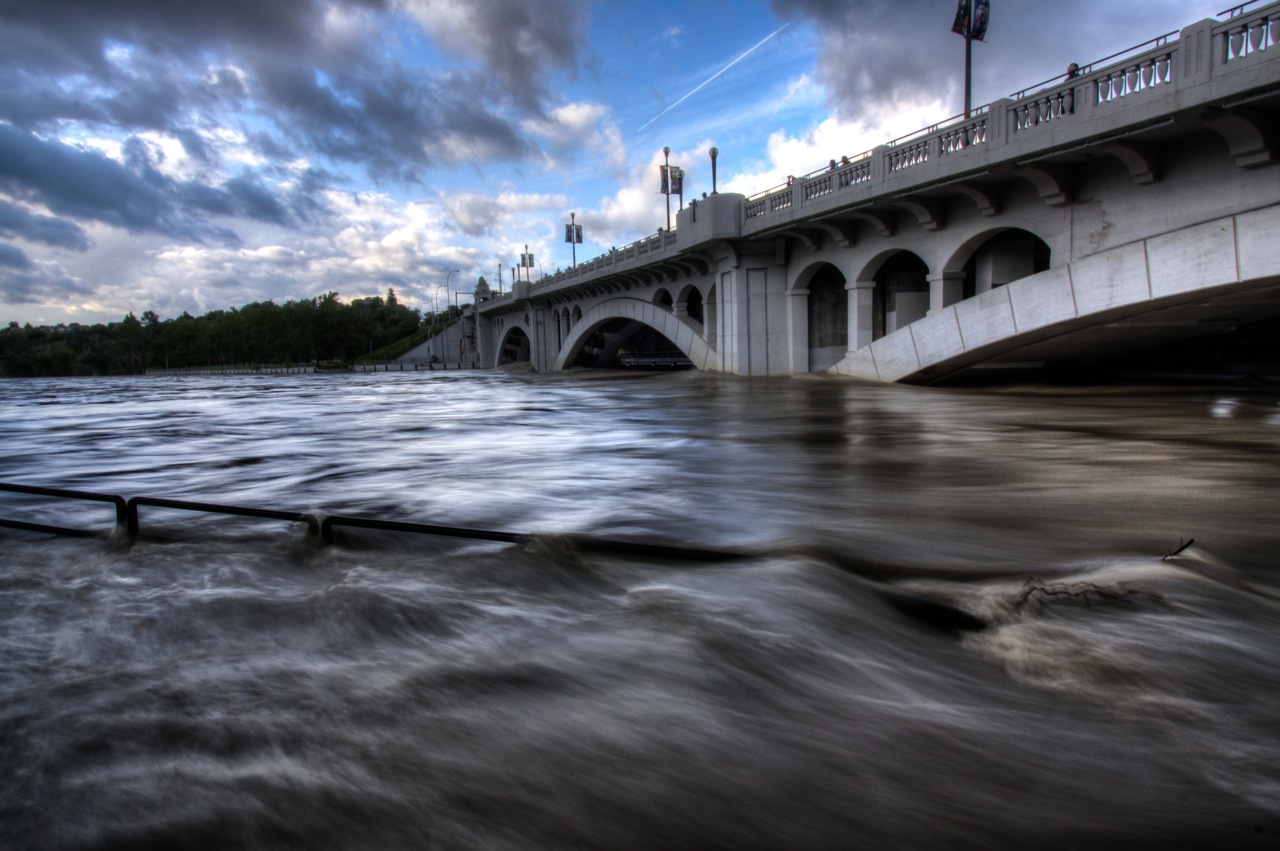
The Centre Street Bridge in Calgary (June 21, 2013).

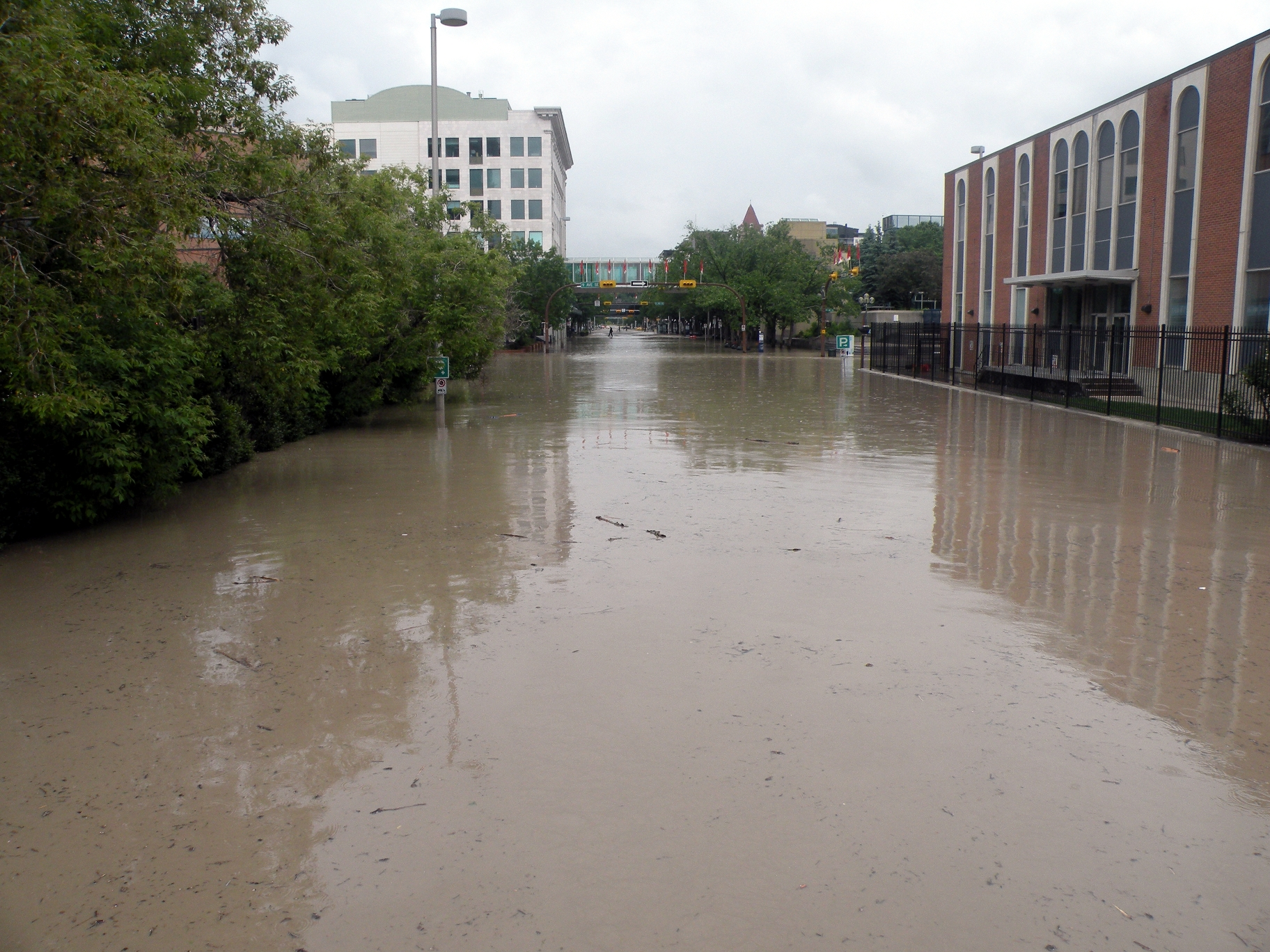
MacLeod Trail under water in Downtown Calgary (June 2013).

=== Flooding in Okotoks ===
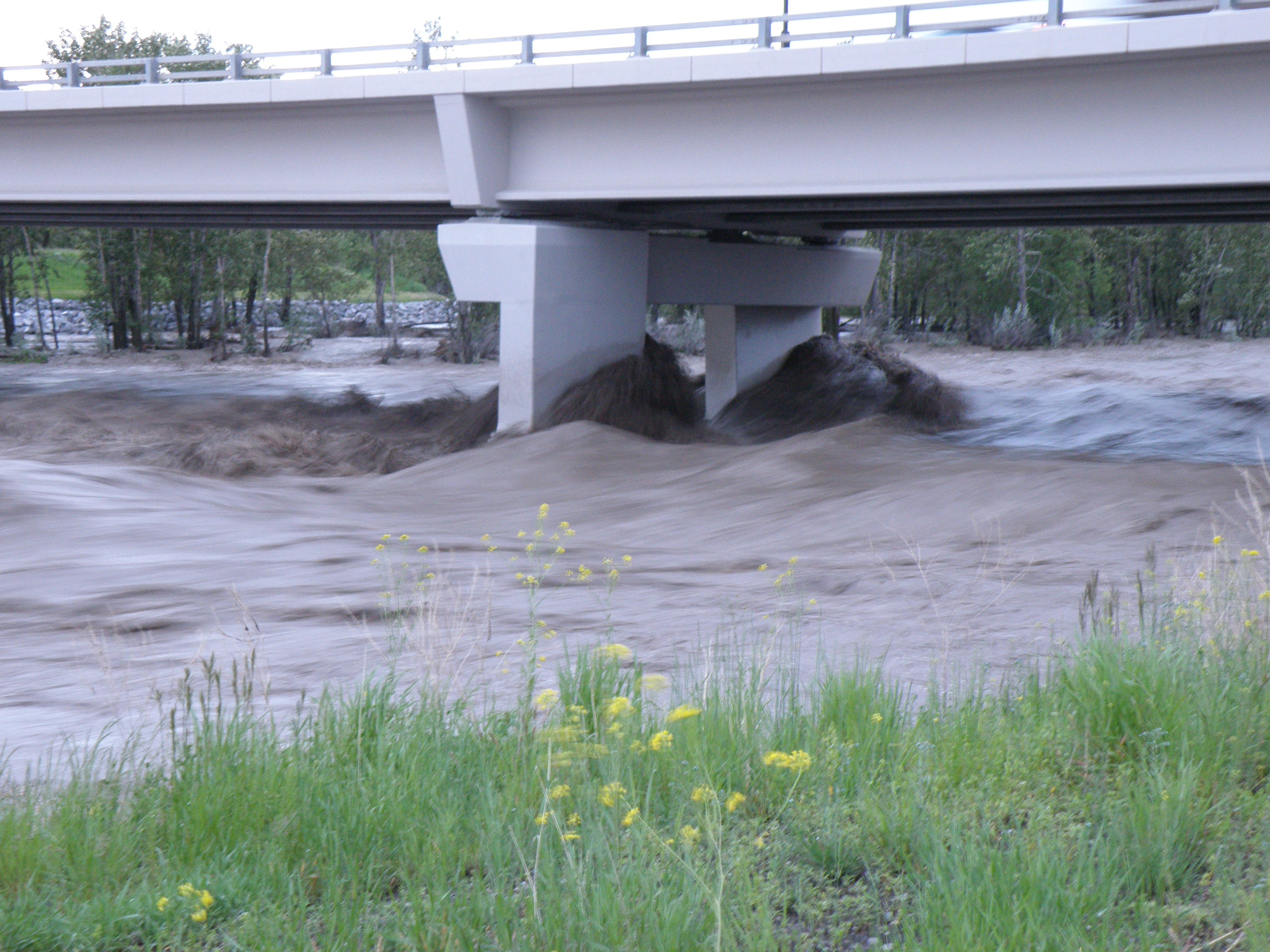
Flood waters rush by the Okotoks 32nd Street bridge on the evening of June 20, 2013.

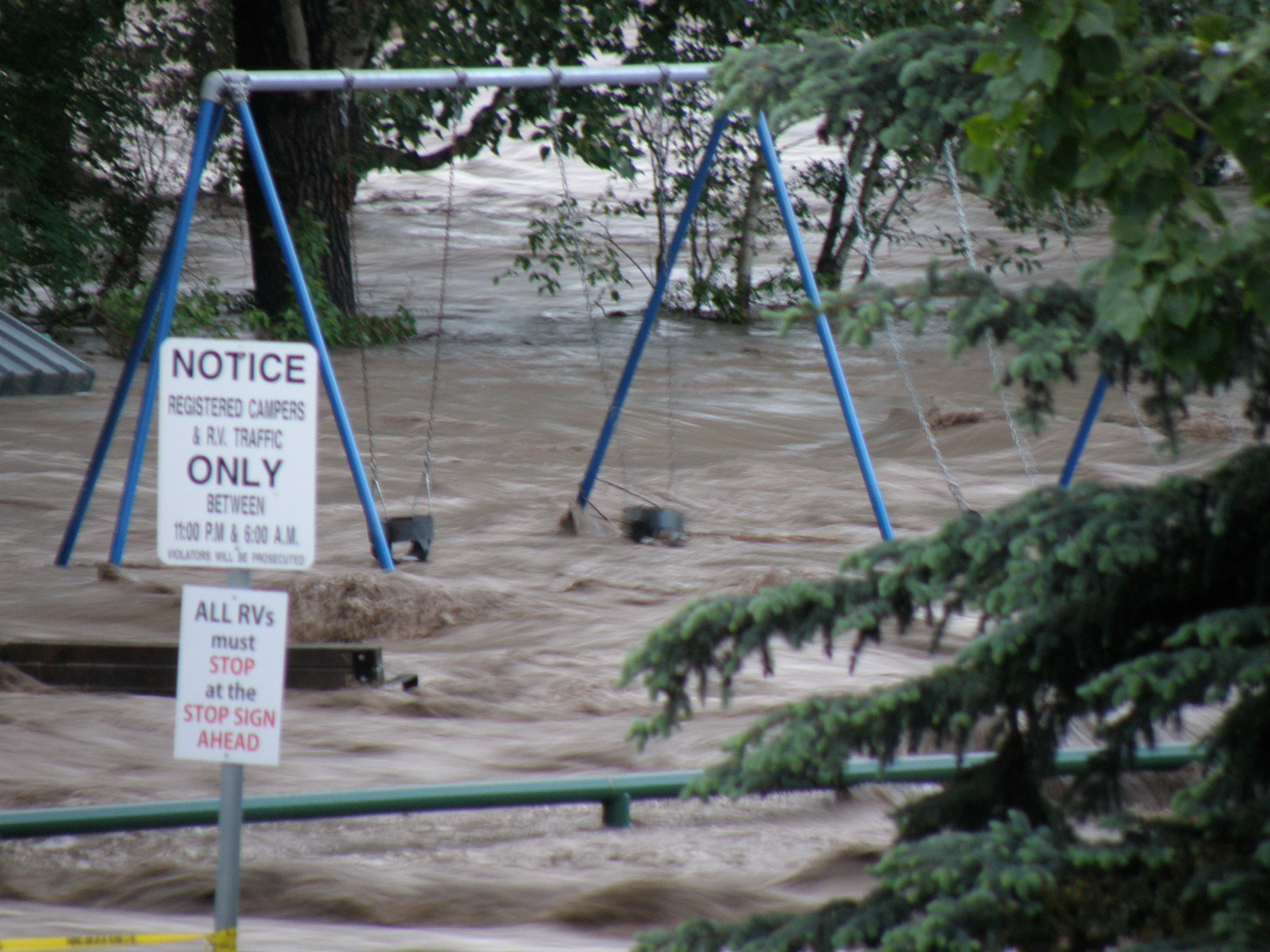
Flood waters rush in from the Sheep River into a local Okotoks campground (June 20, 2013).

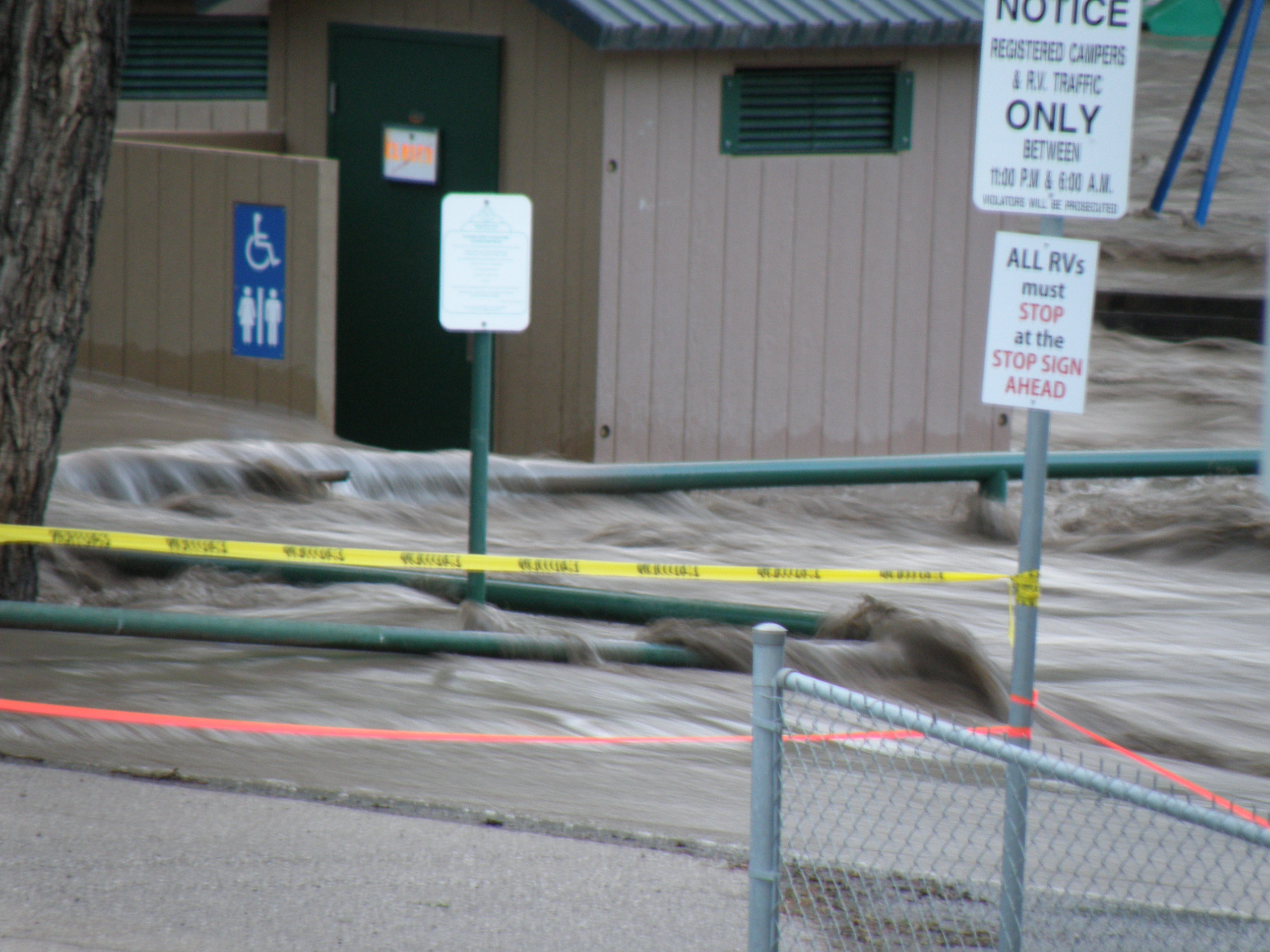
Flood waters from the Sheep River in Okotoks rush into the local campground (June 20, 2013).

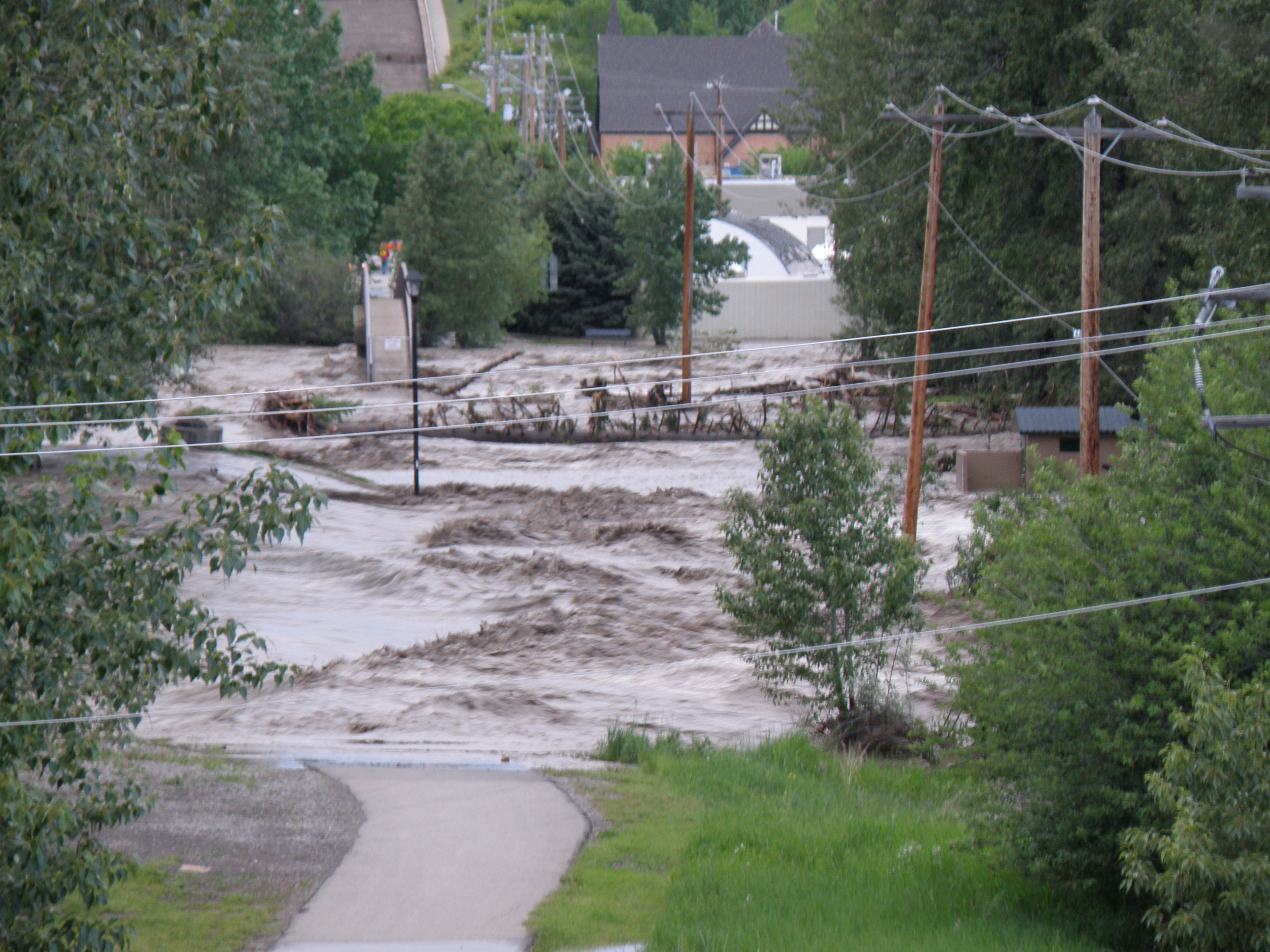
Viewpoint is on the south edge of the River Valley looking towards Okotoks library (June 20, 2013).

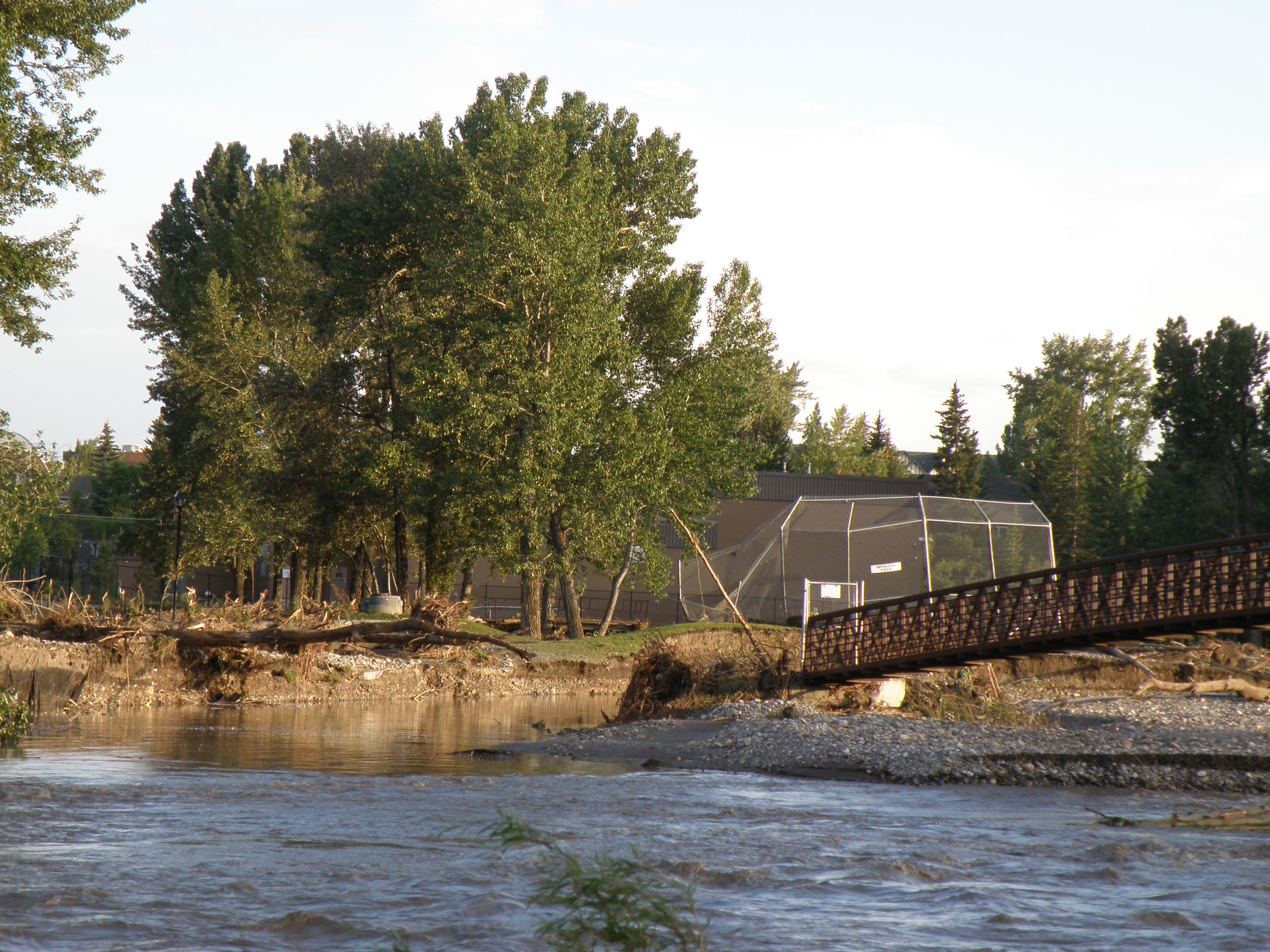
From the viewpoint of the north bank of the Sheep River, just east of the Okotoks library (June 23, 2013).

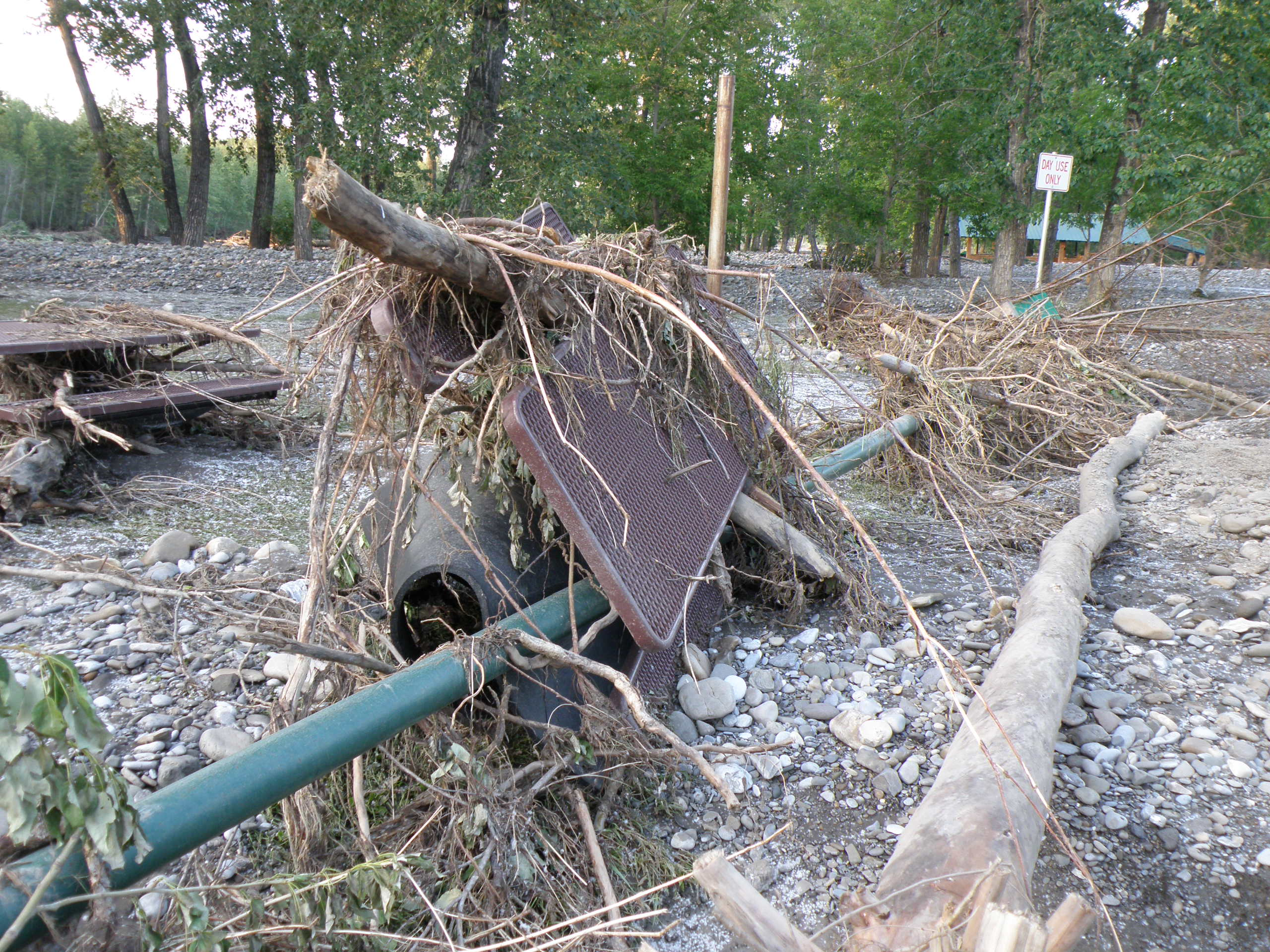
The picnic and day use area of an Okotoks campground, once a grassy meadow, now in some places buried several feet deep in silt and rocks (June 23, 2013)

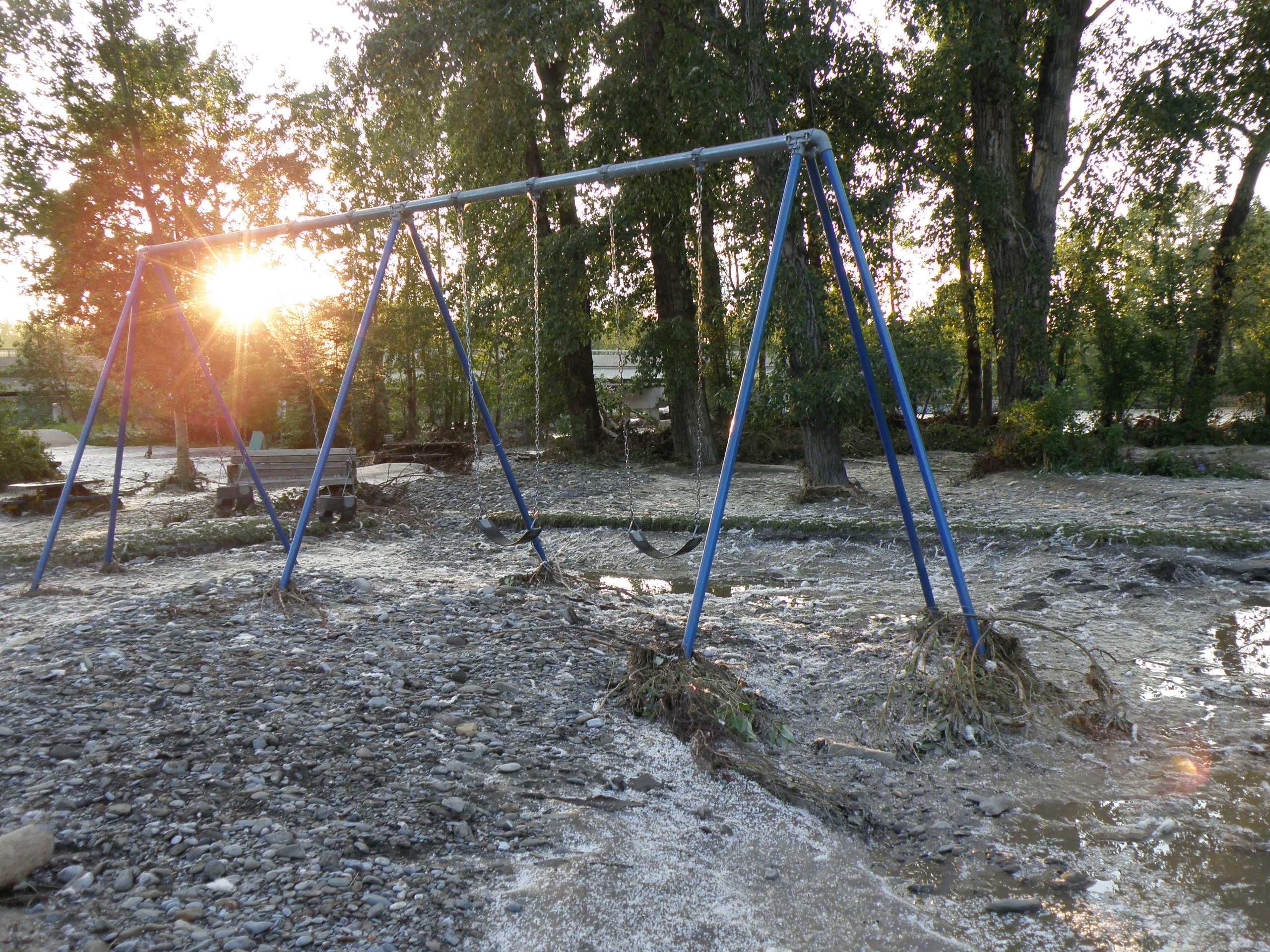
Swingset at Rich's Playground in Okotoks campground after flood waters receded (June 23, 2013)

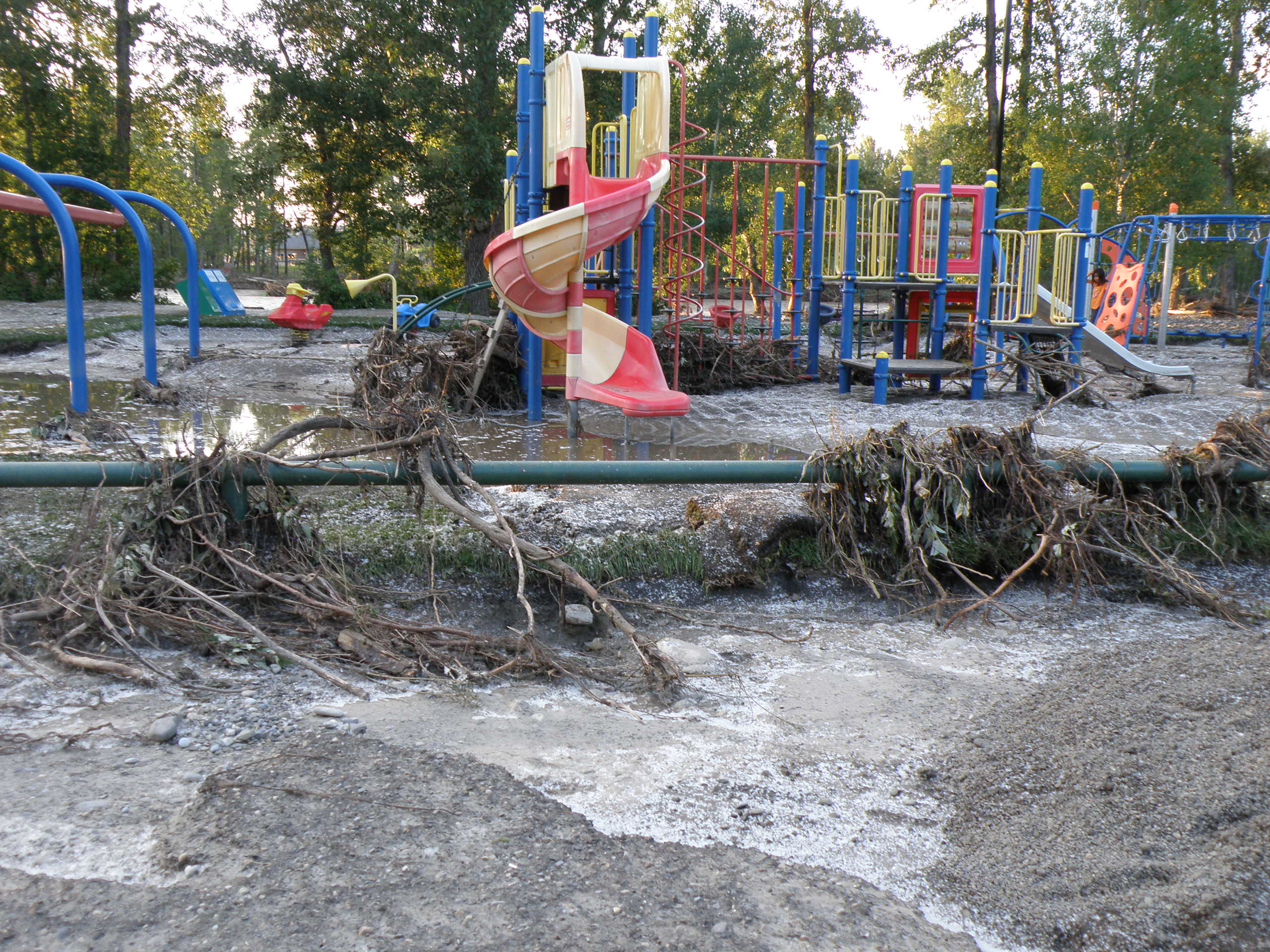
Rich's Playground at Okotoks campground after flood water receded (June 23, 2013)

== See also ==
- 2011 Slave Lake wildfire
- 2016 Fort McMurray wildfire
