= Flood insurance =

Insurance coverage against property loss from flooding

Flood insurance is the specific insurance coverage issued against property loss from flooding. To determine risk factors for specific properties, insurers will often refer to topographical maps that denote lowlands, floodplains and other areas that are susceptible to flooding.

== In the United States ==
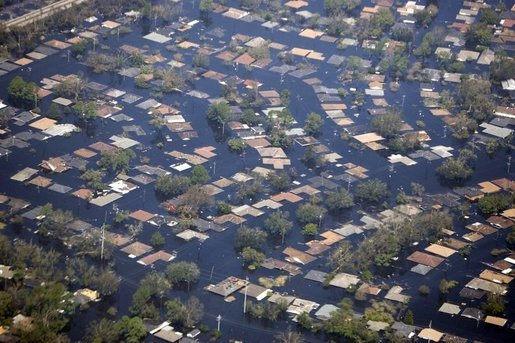
Flooding resulting from Hurricane Katrina

Nationwide, only 20 percent of American homes at risk for floods are covered by flood insurance. Most private insurers do not insure against the peril of flood due to the prevalence of adverse selection, which is the purchase of insurance by persons most affected by the specific peril of flood. In traditional insurance, insurers use the economic law of large numbers to charge a relatively small fee to large numbers of people in order to pay the claims of the small numbers of claimants who have suffered a loss.

Some insurers provide privately written primary flood insurance for high-value residential properties, and for low-value and high value buildings, including through The Natural Catastrophe Insurance Program. However, claimants far outnumber the availability of flood insurance, since most private insurers view the probability of generating a profit from related premium payments to be remote.

In certain flood-prone areas, the federal government requires flood insurance to secure mortgage loans backed by federal agencies such as the FHA and VA. However, the program has never worked as insurance, because of adverse selection. It has never priced people out of living in very risky areas by charging an appropriate premium, instead, too few places are included in the must-insure category, and premiums are artificially low." The lack of flood insurance can be detrimental to many homeowners who may discover only after the damage has been done that their standard insurance policies do not cover flooding.

Flooding is defined by the Federal Emergency Management Agency (FEMA) as a general and temporary condition of partial or complete inundation of two or more acres of normally dry land area or two or more properties (at least one of which is your property) from: Overflow of inland waters, unusual and rapid accumulation or runoff of surface waters from any source, and mudflows. This can be brought on by landslides, hurricanes, earthquakes, or other natural disasters that influence flooding, but while a homeowner may, for example, have earthquake coverage, that coverage may not cover floods as a result of earthquakes.

Very few insurers in the US provide private market flood insurance coverage due to the hazard of flood typically being confined to a few areas. As a result, it is an unacceptable risk due to the inability to spread the risk to a wide enough population in order to absorb the potential catastrophic nature of the hazard. In response to this, the federal government created the National Flood Insurance Program (NFIP) in 1968.

The National Association of Insurance Commissioners (NAIC) found that 33 percent of U.S. heads of household still hold the false belief that flood damage is covered by a standard homeowners policy. FEMA states that approximately 50% of low flood zone risk borrowers think they are ineligible and cannot buy flood insurance. Anyone residing in a community participating in the NFIP can buy flood insurance, even renters. However, unless one lives in a designated floodplain and is required under the terms of a mortgage to purchase flood insurance, flood insurance does not go into effect until 30 days after the policy is first purchased.

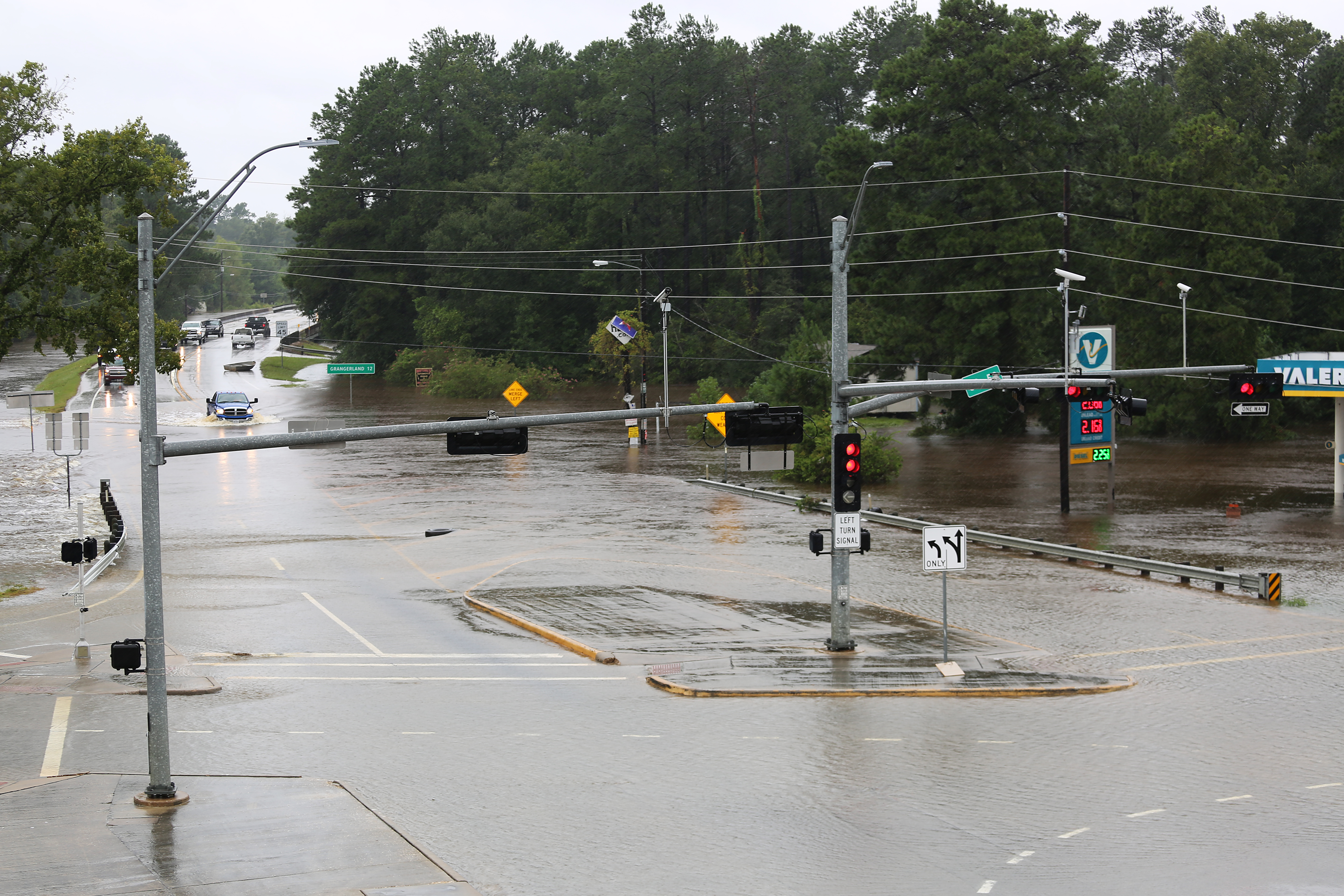
Flooding as a result of Hurricane Harvey in 2017

Individuals who are eligible and who have mortgages on their homes are required by law to purchase a separate flood insurance policy through a private primary flood insurance company or through an insurance company that acts as a distributor for the NFIP. Flood insurance may be available for residents of approximately 19,000 communities nationwide through the NFIP. Flood insurance may be available through private primary flood insurance carriers in any of the 19,000 communities participating in the NFIP as well as other communities that are not participating in the NFIP. In March 2016, TypTap Insurance became the first private market, admitted carrier in the state of Florida to offer non-NFIP flood coverage to policyholders. With increasing risk from extreme weather events that can partially be attributed to climate change, there are increasing risks to the flood insurance market and its long-term sustainability.

After 2017 Hurricane Harvey, estimates of houses covered by flood insurance in the Texas resulting in over $30bn in property losses with only 40% of homes covered by flood insurance.

== In the United Kingdom ==
Usually, the British insurers require from clients living in Flood Risk Areas to flood-proof their homes or face much higher premiums and excesses (American English: deductible).

== In Canada ==
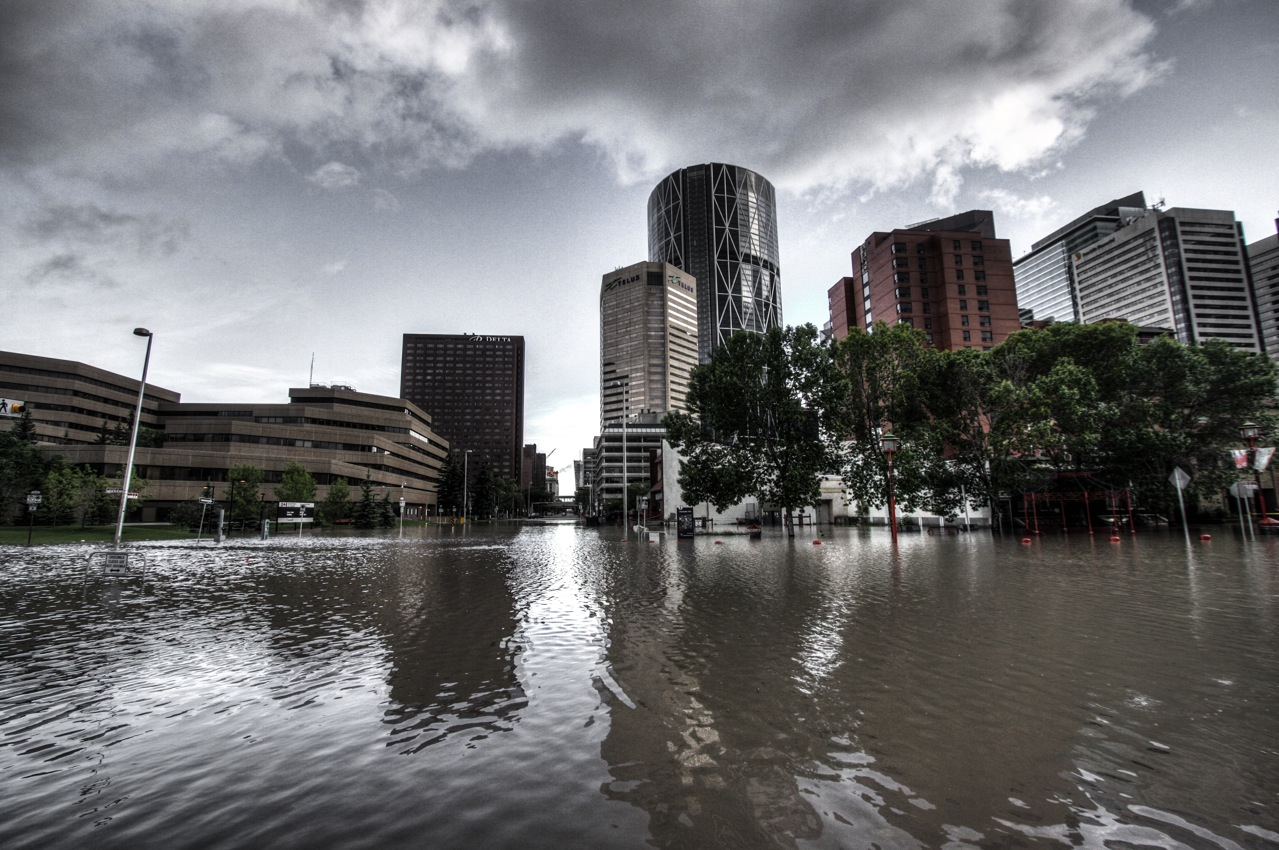
Looking toward Downtown Calgary from Riverfront Avenue during the 2013 Alberta floods (21 June 2013)

Historically, Canada has experienced flood events in specific and predictable areas, making the risk highly concentrated and unaffordable for insurers and homeowners. As a result, there was no economic viability in implementing a federally sponsored flood insurance program that would be available to all homeowners. Canada is the only member of the Group of Eight (G8) where this was the case. Flood insurance is offered by private companies and is not widely available to homeowners; however, after the 2013 Alberta flood, some insurers began to offer more flood endowments in 2015. While there is no federally sponsored flood insurance program, the federal government has aided in flood mitigation through the Federal-Provincial Flood Damage Reduction Program (FDRP) during the 1975-1990s and Disaster Financial Assistance Arrangements (DFAA). The outcome of the FDRP program was flood hazard and floodplain identification maps to limit development in flood-prone areas. The main challenges with these maps are accessibility and accuracy.

Although the Federal Disaster Reduction Program (FDRP) aimed to equip provinces and municipalities with the tools to manage flood risk through mapping, land use planning, and public education, many of these efforts remain underfunded leading to inaccurate or outdated maps. For example, in Ontario, a 2013 study reported a $25 million funding gap, leaving most floodplain maps over 22 years old and available only in hard copy increasing the inaccessibility. In Alberta, outdated flood maps from 1992 were criticized after residents were encouraged to develop in areas inaccurately marked as low-risk. Similarly, in British Columbia, lack of funding was linked to 37.5% of the communities outdated maps and the Real Estate Association found that 69% of the province’s floodplain maps were 20 to 25 years old. Research suggests that Canadian private insurers could create new flood risk maps as they need instead of relying on governments similar to the United Kingdom model. In response to the 2013 Alberta floods, there has been more homeowner pressure for flood protection offerings in the form of overland water protection or overland flood insurance. This is partly attributed to the finding that 70% of homeowners believed their insurance policy included coverage for flood damage and therefore had their claim rejected.
