= Meadowlark Park, Calgary =

Meadowlark Park
- Neighbourhood
- Location of Meadowlark Park in Calgary
- Coordinates: 50°59′52″N 114°04′39″W
- Country: Canada
- Province: Alberta
- City: Calgary
- Quadrant: SW
- Ward: 11
- Established: 1955

Government
  - Mayor: Jeromy Farkas
  - Administrative body: Calgary City Council
  - Councillor: Rob Ward (Communities First)

Area
  - Total: 0.7 km^{2} (0.27 sq mi)
- Elevation: 1,070 m (3,510 ft)

Population (2006)
  - Total: 625
  - Average Income: $65,169
- Website: Meadowlark Park Community Association

Meadowlark Park is a residential neighbourhood in the southwest quadrant of Calgary, Alberta. It is located immediately west from the Chinook Centre, east of Elbow Drive and north of the Glenmore Trail. It is named for the Meadowlark, a prominent songbird of western North America.

It is represented in the Calgary City Council by the Ward 11 councillor.

== Demographics ==
In the City of Calgary's 2012 municipal census, Meadowlark Park had a population of 623 living in 277 dwellings, a 3% increase from its 2011 population of 605. With a land area of 0.6 km^{2} (0.23 sq mi), it had a population density of 1,040/km^{2} (2,690/sq mi) in 2012.

Residents in this community had a median household income of $65,169 in 2000, and there were 13.8% low income residents living in the neighbourhood. As of 2000, 23.5% of the residents were immigrants. All buildings were single-family detached homes, and 13.8% of the housing was used for renting.

Pop. Overtime
Year	Population
2014	632
2015	651
2016	659
2017	665
2018	645
2019	644
2021	610

== Crime ==
Meadowlark Park is one of the worst communities for crime in the city of Calgary. Other communities along MacLeod Trail have high crime such as Manchester, Kingsland, Downtown East Village, Victoria Park, Parkhill, Southwood, Pine Creek, and Windsor Park.

Crime Data
Year	Crime Rate (/100)
2018	24.1
2019	35.7
2020	22.0
2021	18.9
2022	23.4
2023	23.1

== See also ==
- List of neighbourhoods in Calgary
