= Disaster Financial Assistance Arrangements =

Disaster Financial Assistance Arrangements (DFAA) is a program of the Government of Canada that provides financial assistance to provincial and territorial governments following large-scale natural disasters.

Provinces can apply to the program for assistance when eligible costs exceed one dollar per capita, at which point the federal government will share 50% of the cost. If the costs exceed $3 per capita this rises to 75%, and when costs reach $5 per capita, the federal government is required to pay 90 per cent of the costs.

Since its inception in 1970, a 2011–12 report stated that the program had paid out $2 billion in post-disaster assistance. Following the 2013 Alberta floods, $2 billion was earmarked for the province and the government sought a $689-million increase in funding for the program from parliament.

The program has come under criticism for favouring some provinces over others, and for not including public health emergencies in its remit.

DFAA Payments 2007 to 2011
Province/Territory	$ millions
British Columbia	72
Alberta	68
Northwest Territories	60
Yukon	32
Nunavut	30
Saskatchewan	17
Manitoba	12
Ontario	3
Quebec	2
New Brunswick	1
Nova Scotia	1
Prince Edward Island	0
Newfoundland and Labrador	0
TOTAL	298

Events that have received funding include 1996 Saguenay Flood, 1997 Red River flood, 2010 Hurricane Igor in Newfoundland and the 2011 Assiniboine River Flood.
