= Windsor Park, Calgary =

Windsor Park
- Neighbourhood
- Location of Windsor Park in Calgary
- Coordinates: 51°00′18″N 114°04′35″W
- Country: Canada
- Province: Alberta
- City: Calgary
- Quadrant: SW
- Ward: 11
- Established: 1940
- Annexed: 1951

Government
  - Mayor: Jeromy Farkas
  - Administrative body: Calgary City Council
  - Councillor: Rob Ward (Communities First)

Area
  - Total: 0.7 km^{2} (0.27 sq mi)
- Elevation: 1,070 m (3,510 ft)

Population (2006)
  - Total: 3,982
  - Average Income: $39,425
- Website: Windsor Park Community Association

Windsor Park is a residential neighbourhood in the southwest quadrant of Calgary, Alberta. It is bounded by 50 Avenue S to the north, Macleod Trail to the east, 58 Avenue S to the south and the Calgary Golf & Country Club and Elbow River to the west. Chinook Centre is located southeast of the neighbourhood.

Development started in 1940, and the area was annexed to the City of Calgary in 1951. It is represented in the Calgary City Council by the Ward 11 councillors.

== Demographics ==
In the City of Calgary's 2012 municipal census, Windsor Park had a population of 4,126 living in 2,421 dwellings, a 6.9% increase from its 2011 population of 3,858. With a land area of 1.3 km^{2} (0.50 sq mi), it had a population density of 3,170/km^{2} (8,200/sq mi) in 2012.

Residents in this community had a median household income of $39,425 in 2000, and there were 22.6% low income residents living in the neighbourhood. As of 2000, 22.2% of the residents were immigrants. A proportion of 66.4% of the buildings were condominiums or apartments, and 60.8% of the housing was used for renting.

== Crime ==
Windsor Park sits along MacLeod Trail, a corridor of the city in which communities along it have among the worst crime in the city. Communities such as Manchester, Meadowlark Park, Downtown East Village, Parkhill, Kingsland, Victoria Park, and Southwood sit in this corridor.

Crime Data
Year	Crime Rate (/100)
2018	4.3
2019	4.6
2020	4.9
2021	3.8
2022	3.7
2023	2.7

== See also ==
- List of neighbourhoods in Calgary
- Elboya, Calgary
- Manchester, Calgary
- Meadowlark Park, Calgary
- Parkhill, Calgary
