= Elboya, Calgary =

Elboya
- Neighbourhood
- Location of Elboya in Calgary
- Coordinates: 51°00′35″N 114°04′35″W
- Country: Canada
- Province: Alberta
- City: Calgary
- Quadrant: SW
- Ward: 11
- Established: 1947
- Annexed: 1910

Government
  - Administrative body: Calgary City Council

Area
  - Total: 1.0 km^{2} (0.39 sq mi)
- Elevation: 1,075 m (3,527 ft)

Population (2006)
  - Total: 1,683
  - Average Income: $62,374
- Website: Elboya Community Association

Elboya is a residential neighbourhood in the southwest quadrant of Calgary, Alberta. It is bounded by the Elbow River to the north, 4th Street SW / 45 Avenue SW / Macleod Trail to the east, 50 Avenue S to the south and Elbow Drive to the west. Stanley Park borders the community to the northeast.

It was annexed to the City of Calgary in 1910, and was established as a neighbourhood in 1947, when most of the development occurred. It is represented in the Calgary City Council by the Ward 11 councillor.

== Demographics ==
In the City of Calgary's 2012 municipal census, Elboya had a population of 1,712 living in 783 dwellings, a -2% change from its 2011 population of 1,747. With a land area of 0.7 km^{2} (0.27 sq mi), it had a population density of 2,450/km^{2} (6,300/sq mi) in 2012.

Residents in this community had a median household income of $62,374 in 2000, and there were 16% low income residents living in the neighbourhood. As of 2000, 17.1% of the residents were immigrants. A proportion of 37.4% of the buildings were condominiums or apartments, and 39.2% of the housing was used for renting.

== Crime ==
Elboya sits along MacLeod Trail, a corridor of the city where communities that sit along it have among some of the highest crime rate in the city.

Crime Data
Year	Crime Rate (/100)
2018	4.1
2019	3.7
2020	4.0
2021	3.0
2022	2.5
2023	1.8

== Education ==
The community is served by the Elboya Bilingual Elementary & Junior High public school and St. Anthony (Catholic school).

== See also ==
- List of neighbourhoods in Calgary
- Manchester, Calgary
- Parkhill, Calgary
- Windsor Park, Calgary
