= Parkhill, Calgary =

Parkhill Stanley Park
- Neighbourhood
- Location of Parkhill in Calgary
- Coordinates: 51°01′17″N 114°03′56″W
- Country: Canada
- Province: Alberta
- City: Calgary
- Quadrant: SW
- Ward: 9
- Established: 1910

Government
  - Mayor: Jeromy Farkas
  - Administrative body: Calgary City Council
  - Councillor: Harrison Clark (Independent)

Area
  - Total: 0.6 km^{2} (0.23 sq mi)
- Elevation: 1,065 m (3,494 ft)

Population (2006)
  - Total: 1,543
  - Average Income: $60,937
- Website: Parkhill/Stanley Park Community Association

Parkhill is a residential neighbourhood in the southwest quadrant of Calgary, Alberta. It is bounded by Mission Road to the north, Macleod Trail to the east, 42nd Avenue to the south and the Elbow River and Stanley Park to the west. The Roxboro Park borders the community to the north and Stanley Park is established in the Elbow River valley.

This is one of Calgary's oldest neighbourhoods, being established in 1910. It is represented in the Calgary City Council by the Ward 8 councillor. The community has an area redevelopment plan in place.

The community used to be officially titled Parkhill/Stanley Park, but at an unknown time in the 2010s it was renamed to just Parkhill.

== Demographics ==
In the City of Calgary's 2012 municipal census, Parkhill had a population of 1,592 living in 849 dwellings, a -1.9% increase from its 2011 population of 1,623. With a land area of 0.7 km^{2} (0.27 sq mi), it had a population density of 2,270/km^{2} (5,900/sq mi) in 2012.

Residents in this community had a median household income of $60,937 in 2000, and there were 13.6% low income residents living in the neighbourhood. As of 2000, 14.7% of the residents were immigrants. A proportion of 32.8% of the buildings were condominiums or apartments, and 43.1% of the housing was used for renting.

== Crime ==
Parkhill crime levels are higher than most Calgary communities, such as Marlborough; however are typical for the area of the city it is located in.

Crime Data
Year	Crime Rate (/100)
2018	4.1
2019	6.7
2020	5.5
2021	4.9
2022	5.0
2023	3.3

== See also ==
- List of neighbourhoods in Calgary
- Elboya, Calgary
- Manchester, Calgary
- Windsor Park, Calgary
