= Barry Pashak =

Canadian politician (1937–2021)

Member of the Legislative Assembly of Alberta
- In office 1986–1993
- Preceded by: John Zaozirny
- Succeeded by: District abolished
- Constituency: Calgary-Forest Lawn

Leader of the Equity Party
- In office 2000–2001
- Preceded by: Emil van der Poorten
- Succeeded by: Brent Johner

Personal details
- Born: Leonard Barry Pashak; April 21, 1937 Calgary, Alberta
- Died: February 3, 2021 (aged 83) Calgary, Alberta
- Party: Alberta NDP; Equity Party
- Spouse: Wilda Pashak
- Occupation: college instructor, politician

Leonard Barry Pashak (April 21, 1937 – February 3, 2021) was a Canadian university instructor and politician. He served as member of the Legislative Assembly of Alberta (MLA) from 1986 to 1993, sitting with the opposition New Democratic Party (NDP) caucus. He was one of the first two NDP MLAs to be elected in southern Alberta. He later briefly served as leader of The Equity Party, a minor Alberta provincial party, from 2000 until 2001.

== Early life and career ==
Pashak was born in Calgary on April 21, 1937. He grew up in the Mission district of Calgary, and attended Holy Angels School and St. Mary's School. He studied engineering at the University of Oklahoma and obtained a Bachelor of Science from the University of Calgary in 1962. He earned a Master of Arts in Sociology from the University of Calgary in 1971. The title of his thesis was "The Populist characteristics of the Social Credit movement in Alberta". He subsequently taught mathematics and then sociology and political science at Mount Royal University for more than 25 years.

== Political career ==
=== Perennial candidate ===
1971 Alberta general election: Calgary-North Hill
Party	Candidate	Votes	%	±%
Progressive Conservative	Roy Farran	4,961	43.81%	–
Social Credit	Robert A. Simpson	4,900	43.27%	–
New Democratic	Barry Pashak	1,341	11.84%	–
Independent	Carl L. Riech	121	1.07%	–
Total		11,323	–	–
Rejected, spoiled and declined		104	–	–
Eligible electors / turnout		16,080	71.06%	–
Progressive Conservative pickup new district.				
Source(s) Source: "Calgary-North Hill Official Results 1971 Alberta general election". Alberta Heritage Community Foundation.

Pashak got his start as a perennial candidate by running for a seat to the Alberta Legislature for the first time in the 1971 Alberta general election as a candidate for the Alberta NDP in the electoral district of Calgary-North Hill. He finished a distant third out of four in the hotly contested race behind incumbent Social Credit MLA Robert Simpson and winning Progressive Conservative candidate Roy Farran.

One year later, Pashak ran in his first federal election. He stood as a federal New Democratic Party candidate running in the 1972 federal election in the Calgary North federal electoral district. Pashak once again finished a distant third place out of five candidates losing to Progressive Conservative incumbent Eldon Woolliams. He attempted a second run at federal politics running for a seat in the 1979 federal election. For the third time he finished third place in his district. He ran in the federal electoral district of Calgary East for the NDP. He was defeated by Progressive Conservative incumbent John Kushner and also finished behind former MLA Albert Ludwig in the field of seven candidates.

The minority government of Joe Clark fell less than a year later resulting in the 1980 federal election. Pashak ran for a second time in the electoral district of Calgary East. The election was a virtual rerun with Pashak facing Kushner and Ludwig for the second time. On election night Pashak finished third out of the eight candidates but lost almost 700 votes from his 1979 total. He finished behind Kushner and Ludwig respectively.

Pashak returned to provincial politics running as a candidate in the 1982 provincial election in the electoral district of Calgary-Buffalo. He finished a distant third out of four for the fifth time in his career behind winner Progressive Conservative candidate Brian Lee and defeated incumbent Tom Sindlinger. Two years later, he attempted his fourth and final run at federal politics running in the electoral district of Calgary East for the third straight time. He finished a distant third out of eight in the open district behind winner Progressive Conservative candidate Alex Kindy and former Mayor Rod Sykes.

=== Legislative assembly ===
Pashak made an electoral breakthrough when he ran for a seat in the 1986 provincial election in the electoral district of Calgary-Forest Lawn, which was a stronghold for the Progressive Conservatives. The race was hotly contested with nine candidates running. Pashak won the district on heavy vote splitting, finishing slightly ahead of Progressive Conservative candidate Moe Amery to win his first term in office. He and Bob Hawkesworth were the first NDP MLAs to be elected in Calgary and in southern Alberta.

Pashak was the NDP's opposition critic for the energy and education during his time in the legislature. He was also chair of the public accounts committee. Hawkesworth recounted how Pashak endeavoured to improve documentation and disclosure during his tenure as chair. His efforts laid the foundation for "much better fiscal reporting" than previously in place. He was a strong proponent of what has become International Avenue, a district in Calgary that features restaurants and shops of various cultures. Pashak was also noted for his "strong friendship" with Ralph Klein, which began when the latter was mayor of Calgary and extended to when he became premier. This was despite the fact that the two were on opposite sides of the aisle.

Pashak ran for a second term in office in the 1989 provincial election, facing Amery for the second time. Both candidates increased their popular vote in the hotly contested race. Pashak defeated Amery and two other candidates by a larger margin then in 1986 to return to office. Calgary-Forest Lawn was subsequently abolished due to redistribution in 1993. Pashak ran for re-election in the provincial electoral district of Calgary-East, facing Amery for the third consecutive election. Amery's vote surged in the new district while Pashak's popular vote sank from the previous general election. Pashak finished a distant second out of five candidates.

== Later life ==
Pashak briefly returned to the Alberta provincial political scene in 2000 to become leader of the Equity Party, a minor centrist political party in Alberta. He served in that capacity until 2001. He took up competitive bridge after retiring from politics. He later endorsed Dave Taylor in the latter's run for leadership of the Alberta Liberal Party in 2008. Taylor ultimately finished runner-up to David Swann.

Pashak suffered a stroke in around 2010, which rendered him unable to speak. He died on February 3, 2021, in Calgary, at the age of 83.
