= Calgary-Forest Lawn =

Defunct provincial electoral district in Alberta, Canada

Coordinates: 51.04°N 113.97°W

Alberta electoral district

Defunct provincial electoral district
- Legislature: Legislative Assembly of Alberta
- District created: 1979
- District abolished: 1993
- First contested: 1979
- Last contested: 1989

Calgary-Forest Lawn was a provincial electoral district in Calgary, Alberta, Canada, mandated to return a single member to the Legislative Assembly of Alberta using the first past the post method of voting from 1979 to 1993.

== History ==
The Calgary-Forest Lawn electoral district was created in the 1979 electoral re-distribution from the southern end of the Calgary-McCall electoral district. The riding was abolished in the 1993 electoral district re-distribution when it merged with part of Calgary-Millican to re-form Calgary-East.

The riding was named after the Calgary community and former town of Forest Lawn.

=== Members of the Legislative Assembly (MLAs) ===
Members of the Legislative Assembly for Calgary-Forest Lawn
Assembly	Years	Member	Party
See Calgary-McCall from 1971-1979
19th	1979–1982	John Zaozirny	Progressive Conservative
20th	1982–1986	John Zaozirny	Progressive Conservative
21st	1986–1989	Barry Pashak	New Democratic
22nd	1989–1993	Barry Pashak	New Democratic
See Calgary-East electoral district from 1993-Present

== Election results ==
=== 1979 ===
1979 Alberta general election
Party	Candidate	Votes	%	±%
Progressive Conservative	John Zaozirny	5,901	59.70%	–
Social Credit	Don Howes	2,263	22.89%	–
New Democratic	Doug Murdoch	813	8.22%	–
Independent	John Sutherland	577	5.84%	–
Liberal	Marg Bogstie	284	2.87%	–
Communist	Bruce Potter	47	0.48%	–
Total		9,885	–	–
Rejected, spoiled and declined		N/A	–	–
Eligible electors / turnout		22,269	44.39%	–
Progressive Conservative pickup new district.				
Source(s) Source: "Calgary-Forest Lawn Official Results 1979 Alberta general election". Alberta Heritage Community Foundation.

=== 1982 ===
1982 Alberta general election
Party	Candidate	Votes	%	±%
Progressive Conservative	John Zaozirny	9,704	74.13%	14.44%
New Democratic	Ken Richmond	1,478	11.29%	3.07%
Western Canada Concept	Henry Hein Braeutigam	1,244	9.50%	–
Liberal	J. V. W. Gairy	314	2.40%	-0.47%
Social Credit	Ella Ayers	294	2.25%	-20.65%
Communist	Bruce Potter	56	0.43%	-0.05%
Total		13,090	–	–
Rejected, spoiled and declined		34	–	–
Eligible electors / turnout		25,857	50.76%	6.37%
Progressive Conservative hold		Swing		13.02%
Source(s) Source: "Calgary-Forest Lawn Official Results 1982 Alberta general election". Alberta Heritage Community Foundation.

=== 1986 ===
1986 Alberta general election
Party	Candidate	Votes	%	±%
New Democratic	Barry Pashak	2,492	35.86%	24.57%
Progressive Conservative	Moe Amiri	2,410	34.68%	-39.45%
Liberal	Gene Czaprowski	1,111	15.99%	13.59%
Independent	Mikey Graham	271	3.90%	–
Representative	Douglas Williams	237	3.41%	–
Independent	Gerald K. Lee	224	3.22%	–
Independent	Dorothy Bohdan	109	1.57%	–
Independent	Jim Othen	67	0.96%	–
Communist	Bruce Potter	28	0.40%	-0.02%
Total		6,949	–	–
Rejected, spoiled and declined		26	–	–
Eligible electors / turnout		22,614	30.84%	-19.91%
New Democratic gain from Progressive Conservative		Swing		-30.83%
Source(s) Source: "Calgary-Forest Lawn Official Results 1986 Alberta general election". Alberta Heritage Community Foundation.

=== 1989 ===
1989 Alberta general election
Party	Candidate	Votes	%	±%
New Democratic	Barry Pashak	3,994	44.14%	8.28%
Progressive Conservative	Moe Amiri	3,177	35.11%	0.43%
Liberal	Gene Czaprowski	1,584	17.50%	1.52%
Independent	Jim Othen	294	3.25%	2.29%
Total		9,049	–	–
Rejected, spoiled and declined		25	–	–
Eligible electors / turnout		23,968	37.86%	7.02%
New Democratic hold		Swing		3.92%
Source(s) Source: "Calgary-Forest Lawn Official Results 1989 Alberta general election". Alberta Heritage Community Foundation.

== See also ==
- List of Alberta provincial electoral districts
- Canadian provincial electoral districts
