= Peter Singh =

Canadian politician

Peter Singh MLA

Member of the Legislative Assembly of Alberta for Calgary-East
- Incumbent
- Assumed office April 16, 2019
- Preceded by: Robyn Luff

Personal details
- Born: Fiji
- Party: United Conservative Party
- Occupation: Businessman

Peter Singh is a Canadian politician who was elected in the 2019 Alberta general election to represent the electoral district of Calgary-East in the 30th Alberta Legislature as a member of the United Conservative Party (UCP). Singh was re-elected in the 2023 Alberta general election.

Singh was born in the Fiji Islands and has previously owned and operated an automotive repair business.

As an MLA, Singh has advocated that more resources be put into seniors facilities. He has also been opposed to the carbon tax and pushed for a reduction in corporate tax.

Singh currently serves as a member of the Standing Committee on Public Accounts, the Standing Committee on Resource Stewardship, the Standing Committee on Private Bills as well as the Select Special Ombudsman and Public Interest Commissioner Search Committee. Previously he served on the Standing Committee on the Alberta Heritage Savings Trust Fund as well as the Standing Committee on Private Bills and Private Members’ Public Bills.

In May 2019, an investigation was launched by Elections Alberta into Singh's conduct during his 2018 nomination campaign in Calgary-East. Singh was accused by four of his former opponents in November 2018 of using "fraud, forgery, improper inducement and bribery" to gain votes during the nomination campaign. However, both an internal UCP investigation cleared Singh of any wrongdoing and Elections Alberta failed to find enough evidence to publish an offence. Singh maintains his innocence.

A recall petition against Singh was approved by Elections Alberta on November 25, 2025. Signature collection runs from December 6, 2025 to March 5, 2026, requiring 8,593 signatures.

== Electoral history ==
2023 Alberta general election: Calgary-East
Party	Candidate	Votes	%	±%
United Conservative	Peter Singh	7,123	50.23	+0.51
New Democratic	Rosman Valencia	6,425	45.31	+13.13
Green	Jayden Baldonado	403	2.84	+0.52
Solidarity Movement	Garry Dirk	166	1.17	–
Communist	Jonathan Trautman	64	0.45	-0.00
Total		14,181	99.02	–
Rejected and declined		141	0.98	
Turnout		14,322	44.41	
Eligible electors		32,250		
United Conservative hold		Swing		-6.31
Source(s) Source: Elections Alberta

2019 Alberta general election: Calgary-East
Party	Candidate	Votes	%	±%	Expenditures
United Conservative	Peter Singh	7,520	49.72	-4.54	$33,681
New Democratic	Cesar Cala	4,867	32.18	-8.31	$50,555
Alberta Party	Gar Gar	1,879	12.42	+11.20	$16,933
Liberal	Michelle Robinson	439	2.90	-0.70	$3,792
Green	William Carnegie	351	2.32	–	$3,515
Communist	Jonathan Trautman	69	0.46	+0.03	$500
Total		15,125	99.12	–	
Rejected, spoiled and declined		135	0.88		
Turnout		15,260	47.92		
Eligible voters		31,843			
United Conservative notional hold		Swing		+1.89	
Source(s) Source: Elections Alberta Note: Expenses is the sum of "Election Expenses", "Other Expenses" and "Transfers Issued". The Elections Act limits "Election Expenses" to $50,000.
