= Moe Amery =

Canadian politician (1954–2023)

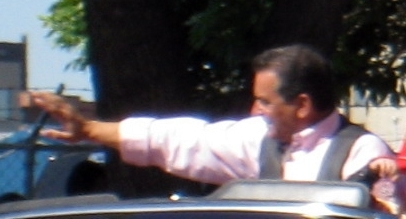
- Amery in 2010

Member of the Legislative Assembly of Alberta for Calgary-East
- In office June 15, 1993 – May 5, 2015
- Preceded by: New district
- Succeeded by: Robyn Luff

Personal details
- Born: Mohammed Amiri; September 20, 1954 Lala, Beqaa, Lebanon
- Died: October 19, 2023 (aged 69)
- Party: Progressive Conservative
- Spouse: Mary
- Children: 5 (including Mickey Amery)
- Occupation: Realtor, politician

Mohammed Amery (né Amiri; September 20, 1954 – October 19, 2023) was a Canadian politician who was a member of the Legislative Assembly of Alberta. He represented the constituency of Calgary-East as a Progressive Conservative.

== Early life ==
Amery was born Mohammed Amiri (he changed his name sometime between 1989 and 1993) in Lala, Beqaa, Lebanon on September 20, 1954, and came to Canada in 1974. He studied at the University of Alberta from 1975 until 1977, after which time he relocated to Calgary to become a realtor until his election to the Legislative Assembly of Alberta in 1993.

== Provincial politics ==
=== Electoral record ===
Amery's first two bids for elected office were unsuccessful; he sought provincial election in Calgary-Forest Lawn in the 1986 and 1989 elections, but was defeated both times, finishing second to New Democrat Barry Pashak each time. He was more successful in 1993, when he more than doubled Pashak's vote count in the newly formed Calgary-East. He was handily re-elected in each of the 1997, 2001, 2004, and 2008 elections.

=== Legislative initiatives ===
In 1994, Amery introduced two different bills called the Maintenance Enforcement Amendment Act. The first, a private member's bill, would have made it impossible for individuals in arrears on child support payments to register their vehicles or renew their drivers' licenses. The second, a government bill, included the objectives of the first, but also took other measures, including ending a provision by which money held in a joint bank account could not be drawn upon to satisfy child support payments owed by one of the account-holders. The government bill passed with the support of the Progressive Conservatives and some Liberals, including Sine Chadi and Michael Henry. Other Liberals - including Gary Dickson, Debby Carlson, Bettie Hewes, Mike Percy, Percy Wickman, Ken Nicol, Nicholas Taylor, and Colleen Soetaert - opposed the bill on the grounds that it didn't go far enough in taking measures to recover payments, promoted animosity in an already adversarial process, and was written with insufficient consultation with the recently privatized registries centres. After the government bill passed, the private member's bill was ruled redundant by Speaker Stanley Schumacher.

Amery introduced a number of private member's bills designed to extend primary education to include kindergarten, requiring school boards to provide it and making attendance compulsory. The first two of these - both called the School Amendment Act, sponsored in 1995 and 1997 - failed to reach second reading before the legislature adjourned. Amery's third attempt, the School (Early Childhood Services) Amendment Act, was defeated on second reading. Liberals were unanimous in their support of the bill, pointing to similar bills that had previously been sponsored by Liberal MLAs Grant Mitchell and Michael Henry. Several of Amery's Progressive Conservative colleagues, including Mary O'Neill, Albert Klapstein, and Wayne Cao, also lent their support. However, the bill was defeated on second reading with a majority of the Progressive Conservative caucus voting against. Victor Doerksen, the only Conservative to speak in opposition to the bill, expressed concern that instituting mandatory attendance at the kindergarten level constituted an infringement on parental autonomy. New Democrat Raj Pannu, the only member of his caucus present for the vote, also opposed the bill, on the grounds that it would allow private groups to provide kindergarten with the approval of the Minister of Learning.

In 1996, Amery sponsored the Wildlife Amendment Act, a government bill that created a scientific committee to make recommendations on the designation of endangered and threatened species, expanded fish and wildlife agents' abilities to check for infractions of firearms regulations by hunters, and downloaded several government powers that had previously resided with the Lieutenant Governor by Order in Council to the Minister of Environmental Protection. Some Liberals, including Duco Van Binsbergen and Bruce Collingwood, raised concerns that the bill didn't go far enough, but it was passed into law.

=== Committee duties ===
Amery sat on numerous committees since being elected. In addition to his regular responsibilities as an MLA, he served as chair of the Environmental Protection Advisory Committee and co-chair of the Secondary Suites Committee as well as a member of the Standing Committee on Privileges and Elections, Standing Orders and Printing, the Standing Committee on Private Bills, the Standing Committee on Public Accounts, the Standing Committee on the Alberta Heritage Savings Trust Fund, the Standing Committee on Government Services, the Standing Policy Committee on Agriculture, Environment and Rural Affairs, the Standing Policy Committee on Energy and Sustainable Development, and the Cabinet Policy Committee on Community Services in addition to serving as a member of the International Governance Office Advisory Committee, the Glenbow-Museum Advisory Committee, the MLA Committee To Review Low-income Programs, and the MLA Implementation Team on the Future Selection of RHA Members. He was also the MLA representative on the City of Calgary's 2005 World Fair bid. Amery served as a member of the Standing Committee on the Economy, the Standing Committee on Private Bills, and the Standing Committee on Privileges and Elections, Standing Orders and Printing.

=== Political views ===
Amery broke with his party on several occasions regarding issues that mattered to his constituents. In March 2006 he was critical of the Ralph Klein government for insufficiently funding school maintenance after the roof of a school in his riding collapsed. In 2007 and during the 2008 election campaign, he advocated rent controls to deal with the tight housing market in urban Alberta, although the position of the Ed Stelmach government was that they would be unhelpful.

=== Passport incident ===
In 2002, the Royal Canadian Mounted Police began investigating whether Amery acted as guarantor for the passport application of a constituent who he had not known for the required two years. He was charged with doing so in 2004. The case went to trial in March 2005, when Amery alleged that, by telling him not to use character references from his colleagues, Progressive Conservative whip Denis Ducharme undermined "Amery's ability to make full answer and defence". The charges were ultimately stayed.

== Federal politics ==
In December 2017, Amery announced that he would challenge sitting Conservative MP Deepak Obhrai for the nomination in Calgary Forest Lawn.

== Personal life and death ==
Amery was married to Maryam Abu Ghosn, and the couple has five children: Mickey, Lila, Leena, Laura, and Malaak. Mickey was elected as the Member of the Alberta Legislature in the 2019 election in the riding of Calgary-Cross. He was involved in his community, including the community associations in Calgary-East. He identified Winston Churchill as his political hero.

Moe Amery died on October 19, 2023, at the age of 69.

== Election results ==
1986 Alberta general election: Calgary-Forest Lawn
Party	Candidate	Votes	%	±%
New Democratic	Barry Pashak	2,492	35.86%	24.57%
Progressive Conservative	Moe Amiri	2,410	34.68%	-39.45%
Liberal	Gene Czaprowski	1,111	15.99%	13.59%
Independent	Mikey Graham	271	3.90%	–
Representative	Douglas Williams	237	3.41%	–
Independent	Gerald K. Lee	224	3.22%	–
Independent	Dorothy Bohdan	109	1.57%	–
Independent	Jim Othen	67	0.96%	–
Communist	Bruce Potter	28	0.40%	-0.02%
Total		6,949	–	–
Rejected, spoiled and declined		26	–	–
Eligible electors / turnout		22,614	30.84%	-19.91%
New Democratic gain from Progressive Conservative		Swing		-30.83%
Source(s) Source: "Calgary-Forest Lawn Official Results 1986 Alberta general election". Alberta Heritage Community Foundation.

1989 Alberta general election: Calgary-Forest Lawn
Party	Candidate	Votes	%	±%
New Democratic	Barry Pashak	3,994	44.14%	8.28%
Progressive Conservative	Moe Amiri	3,177	35.11%	0.43%
Liberal	Gene Czaprowski	1,584	17.50%	1.52%
Independent	Jim Othen	294	3.25%	2.29%
Total		9,049	–	–
Rejected, spoiled and declined		25	–	–
Eligible electors / turnout		23,968	37.86%	7.02%
New Democratic hold		Swing		3.92%
Source(s) Source: "Calgary-Forest Lawn Official Results 1989 Alberta general election". Alberta Heritage Community Foundation.

1993 Alberta general election: Calgary-East
Party	Candidate	Votes	%	±%
Progressive Conservative	Moe Amery	5,503	54.48%	–
New Democratic	Barry Pashak	2,306	22.83%	–
Liberal	Dale Muti	1,689	16.72%	–
Social Credit	Lera G. Shirley	366	3.62%	–
Independent	Alain Horchower	237	2.35%	–
Total		10,101	–	–
Rejected, spoiled and declined		34	–	–
Eligible electors / turnout		20,638	49.11%	–
Progressive Conservative pickup new district.				
Source(s) Source: "Calgary-East Official Results 1993 Alberta general election". Alberta Heritage Community Foundation.

1997 Alberta general election: Calgary-East
Party	Candidate	Votes	%	±%
Progressive Conservative	Moe Amery	4,857	60.19%	5.71%
Liberal	Kelly McDonnell	1,990	24.66%	7.94%
Social Credit	Raymond (Chick) Hurst	613	7.60%	3.97%
New Democratic	Marg Elliot	609	7.55%	-15.28%
Total		8,069	–	–
Rejected, spoiled and declined		50	15	6
Eligible electors / turnout		21,214	38.30%	-10.81%
Progressive Conservative hold		Swing		1.94%
Source(s) Source: "Calgary-East Official Results 1997 Alberta general election". Alberta Heritage Community Foundation. Alberta. Chief Electoral Officer (1997). Report of the Chief Electoral Officer, November, 1996 general enumeration and Tuesday, March 11, 1997 general election Twenty-fourth Legislative Assembly. Edmonton: Alberta Legislative Assembly, Office of the Chief Electoral Officer. pp. 100–101.

2001 Alberta general election: Calgary-East
Party	Candidate	Votes	%	±%
Progressive Conservative	Moe Amery	6,038	70.82%	10.63%
Liberal	Brendan Dunphy	2,010	23.57%	-1.09%
New Democratic	Giorgio Cattabeni	328	3.85%	-3.70%
Social Credit	Alan Schoonover	109	1.28%	-6.32%
Communist	Jason Devine	41	0.48%	–
Total		8,526	–	–
Rejected, spoiled and declined		27	15	33
Eligible electors / turnout		20,509	41.86%	3.56%
Progressive Conservative hold		Swing		5.86%
Source(s) Source: "Calgary-East Official Results 2001 Alberta general election". Alberta Heritage Community Foundation. Alberta. Chief Electoral Officer (2001). The report of the Chief Electoral Officer on the 2000 provincial confirmation process and Monday, March 12, 2001, Provincial General Election of the twenty-fifth Legislative Assembly. Edmonton: Alberta Legislative Assembly, Office of the Chief Electoral Officer. pp. 72–73.

2004 Alberta general election: Calgary-East
Party	Candidate	Votes	%	±%
Progressive Conservative	Moe Amery	4,484	53.82%	-17.00%
Liberal	Bill Harvey	2,357	28.29%	4.71%
Alberta Alliance	Brad Berard	606	7.27%	–
New Democratic	Paul Vargis	464	5.57%	1.72%
Green	Rick Michalenko	365	4.38%	–
Communist	Bonnie-Jean Collins	56	0.67%	0.19%
Total		8,332	–	–
Rejected, spoiled and declined		56	43	3
Eligible electors / turnout		22,759	36.87%	-5.00%
Progressive Conservative hold		Swing		-10.86%
Source(s) Source: "Calgary-East Statement of Official Results 2004 Alberta general election" (PDF). Elections Alberta. Alberta. Chief Electoral Officer (2005). Report of the Chief Electoral Officer on the General Enumeration and General Election of the Twenty-sixth Legislative Assembly (Report). Edmonton: Alberta Legislative Assembly, Office of the Chief Electoral Officer. pp. 100–103.

2008 Alberta general election: Calgary-East
Party	Candidate	Votes	%	±%
Progressive Conservative	Moe Amery	4,583	53.85%	0.04%
Liberal	Bill Harvey	2,433	28.59%	0.30%
Wildrose Alliance	Mike McCracken	681	8.00%	0.73%
New Democratic	Christopher Dovey	425	4.99%	-0.57%
Green	Ross Cameron	333	3.91%	-0.47%
Communist	Bonnie-Jean Collins	55	0.65%	-0.03%
Total		8,510	–	–
Rejected, spoiled and declined		37	24	11
Eligible electors / turnout		28,616	29.99%	–
Progressive Conservative hold		Swing		-0.13%
Source(s) Source: "06 - Calgary-East, 2008 Alberta general election". officialresults.elections.ab.ca. Elections Alberta. Chief Electoral Officer (2008). The Report on the March 3, 2008 Provincial General Election of the Twenty-Seventh Legislative Assembly (Report). Edmonton, Alta.: Elections Alberta. pp. 190–193.

2012 Alberta general election: Calgary-East
Party	Candidate	Votes	%	±%
Progressive Conservative	Moe Amery	5,924	45.57%	-8.29%
Wildrose Alliance	Jasbir (Jesse) Minhas	4,995	38.42%	30.42%
New Democratic	Robyn Luff	1,136	8.74%	3.74%
Liberal	Ali Abdulbaki	780	6.00%	-22.59%
Communist	Bonnie Devine	166	1.28%	0.63%
Total		13,001	–	–
Rejected, spoiled and declined		143	42	29
Eligible electors / turnout		30,196	43.62%	11.27%
Progressive Conservative hold		Swing		-9.06%
Source(s) Source: "08 - Calgary-East, 2012 Alberta general election". officialresults.elections.ab.ca. Elections Alberta. Chief Electoral Officer (2012). The Report of the Chief Electoral Officer on the 2011 Provincial Enumeration and Monday, April 23, 2012 Provincial General Election of the Twenty-eighth Legislative Assembly (PDF) (Report). Edmonton, Alta.: Elections Alberta. pp. 120–123. Archived (PDF) from the original on May 6, 2021.

2015 Alberta general election: Calgary-East
Party	Candidate	Votes	%	±%
New Democratic	Robyn Luff	5,506	39.18%	30.44%
Progressive Conservative	Moe Amery	3,971	28.26%	-17.31%
Wildrose	Ali Waissi	3,633	25.85%	-12.57%
Liberal	Naser Al-Kukhun	806	5.74%	-0.26%
Communist	Bonnie Devine	138	0.98%	-0.29%
Total		14,054	–	–
Rejected, spoiled and declined		61	40	32
Eligible electors / turnout		34,585	40.91%	-2.72%
New Democratic gain from Progressive Conservative		Swing		1.89%
Source(s) Source: "08 - Calgary-East, 2015 Alberta general election". officialresults.elections.ab.ca. Elections Alberta. Chief Electoral Officer (2016). 2015 General Election. A Report of the Chief Electoral Officer (PDF) (Report). Edmonton, Alta.: Elections Alberta. pp. 116–120.
