= Robyn Luff =

Canadian politician

Member of the Legislative Assembly of Alberta for Calgary-East
- In office May 5, 2015 – March 19, 2019
- Preceded by: Moe Amery
- Succeeded by: Peter Singh

Personal details
- Born: June 3, 1980 (age 45) Duncan, British Columbia, Canada
- Party: Independent (2018–)
- Other political affiliations: New Democratic (2015–2018)
- Occupation: Teacher

Robyn Luff (born June 3, 1980) is an Alberta politician who was elected in the 2015 Alberta general election to the Legislative Assembly of Alberta representing the electoral district of Calgary-East as a member of the Alberta NDP caucus. She sat as an independent from November 2018 until the dissolution of legislature in March 2019 in preparation for that year's general election.

Luff pulled off one of the biggest upsets on election night, as she defeated long time MLA Moe Amery to win the riding of Calgary-East.

On November 5, 2018, Luff made a statement announcing her refusal to sit in the Alberta legislature until changes were made to what she described as a "toxic culture" within the Alberta NDP caucus that prevented MLAs from expressing their views and properly representing their constituents. The government denied the allegations and removed Luff from its caucus later that evening, stating that it had "lost confidence in her ability to participate as a productive and trustworthy member of the government caucus".

== Electoral record ==
2015 Alberta general election: Calgary-East
Party	Candidate	Votes	%	±%
New Democratic	Robyn Luff	5,506	39.18%	30.44%
Progressive Conservative	Moe Amery	3,971	28.26%	-17.31%
Wildrose	Ali Waissi	3,633	25.85%	-12.57%
Liberal	Naser Al-Kukhun	806	5.74%	-0.26%
Communist	Bonnie Devine	138	0.98%	-0.29%
Total		14,054	–	–
Rejected, spoiled and declined		61	40	32
Eligible electors / turnout		34,585	40.91%	-2.72%
New Democratic gain from Progressive Conservative		Swing		1.89%
Source(s) Source: "08 - Calgary-East, 2015 Alberta general election". officialresults.elections.ab.ca. Elections Alberta. Chief Electoral Officer (2016). 2015 General Election. A Report of the Chief Electoral Officer (PDF) (Report). Edmonton, Alta.: Elections Alberta. pp. 116–120.
