= Mickey Amery =

Canadian politician

The Honourable Mickey Amery ECA KC MLA
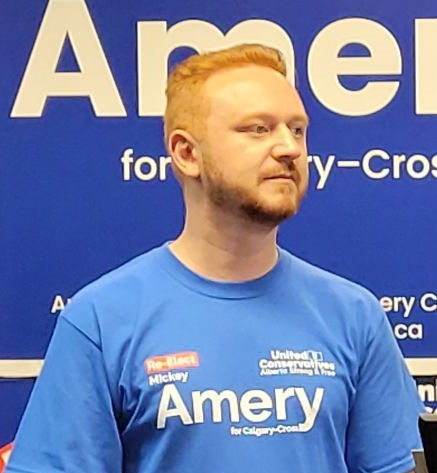
- Mickey Amery

Alberta Minister of Justice and Attorney General of Alberta
- Incumbent
- Assumed office June 9, 2023
- Premier: Danielle Smith
- Preceded by: Tyler Shandro

Alberta Minister of Children Services
- In office October 21, 2022 – June 9, 2023
- Premier: Danielle Smith
- Preceded by: Matt Jones

Member of the Legislative Assembly of Alberta for Calgary-Cross
- Incumbent
- Assumed office April 16, 2019
- Preceded by: Ricardo Miranda

Personal details
- Born: April 26, 1982 (age 44) Calgary, Alberta, Canada
- Party: United Conservative Party
- Spouse: Heather Amery (m. 2009)
- Children: 3
- Parent(s): Moe Amery and Maryam Abu Ghosn
- Occupation: lawyer

Mickey Amery (legal name Qassim Mohammed Makki Amery) ECA KC MLA (born April 26, 1982) is a Canadian politician and former lawyer who has been the Alberta Minister of Justice since June 9, 2023. Amery was elected in the 2019 Alberta general election to represent the electoral district of Calgary-Cross in the 30th Alberta Legislature.

== Biography ==
Amery was born on 26 April 1982 in Calgary, Alberta, Canada to Lebanese parents; Moe Amery a Politician and his wife Maryam Abu Ghosn. He is on the Social Services Cabinet Policy Committee and the Legislative Review Committee. On October 21, 2022, Amery was appointed Alberta Minister of Children Services.

Amery was re-elected in the 2023 Alberta general election, and was appointed justice minister on June 9, 2023.

Prior to his engagement in the Alberta Legislature, Amery was a practising lawyer and business owner in Calgary, Alberta. He has practised in the areas of family, criminal, civil and administrative law. He has worked on a number of cases of national significance in the areas of aboriginal law and consumer protection. Amery also was a director for the Learning Disability Association of Alberta and a member of various local community boards and organizations. A University of Calgary alumnus, Amery holds a bachelor's degree in political science, a bachelor's degree in economics, and a Juris Doctor degree in law.

In 2026, The Globe and Mail published an investigation which implicated Amery in changing electoral investigation laws while Sam Mraiche (to whom Amery is "loosely related") was under scrutiny for irregular electoral contributions.

Amery is the son of longtime Calgary-East MLA Moe Amery.

== Electoral history ==
=== 2023 general election ===
2023 Alberta general election: Calgary-Cross
| Party | Candidate | Votes | % | ±% |
|---|---|---|---|---|
| United Conservative | Mickey Amery | 7,533 | 50.19 | -4.07 |
| New Democratic | Gurinder Singh Gill | 7,019 | 46.77 | +9.39 |
| Green | Aman Sandhu | 254 | 1.69 | – |
| Solidarity Movement | Kathryn Lapp | 202 | 1.35 | – |
| Total | | 15,008 | 99.14 | – |
| Rejected and declined | | 130 | 0.86 | |
| Turnout | | 15,138 | 49.81 | |
| Eligible voters | | 30,393 | | |
| United Conservative hold | | Swing | | -6.73 |
Source(s) Source: Elections Alberta

=== 2019 general election ===
2019 Alberta general election: Calgary-Cross
| Party | Candidate | Votes | % | ±% | Expenditures |
|---|---|---|---|---|---|
| United Conservative | Mickey Amery | 8,907 | 54.26 | +2.75† | $39,209 |
| New Democratic | Ricardo Miranda | 6,135 | 37.38 | +1.25 | $54,925 |
| Alberta Party | Braham Luddu | 962 | 5.86 | – | $6,936 |
| Liberal | Naser Kukhun | 410 | 2.50 | -6.88 | $4,299 |
| Total | | 16,414 | 99.27 | – | |
| Rejected, spoiled and declined | | 121 | 0.73 | – | |
| Turnout | | 16,535 | 53.61 | | |
| Eligible voters | | 30,844 | | | |
| United Conservative notional hold | | Swing | | -2.25 | |
Source(s) Source: Elections Alberta Note: Expenses is the sum of "Election Expenses", "Other Expenses" and "Transfers Issued". The Elections Act limits "Election Expenses" to $50,000. †Comparison for UCP is to the combined Wildrose & PC redistributed vote in 2015
