= Calgary-Mountain View =

Provincial electoral district in Alberta, Canada

Coordinates: 51.06°N 114.07°W

Alberta electoral district
- Calgary-Mountain View within the City of Calgary, 2017 boundaries

Provincial electoral district
- Legislature: Legislative Assembly of Alberta
MLA
Kathleen Ganley
New Democratic
- District created: 1971
- First contested: 1971
- Last contested: 2023

Calgary-Mountain View is a provincial electoral district in Calgary, Alberta, Canada, mandated to return a single member to the Legislative Assembly of Alberta using the first past the post method of voting. The district was created in 1971 and is currently represented by Kathleen Ganley of the Alberta New Democratic Party.

== History ==
The electoral district was created in the 1971 boundary redistribution from parts of Calgary-North and Calgary-East. Following the 2004 Alberta boundary re-distribution Calgary-Mountain View had a population of 39,586, which was 10.1 per cent above the provincial average of 35,951, which was the highest deviation for an electoral district in Calgary or Edmonton.

The 2010 Alberta boundary re-distribution all land west of Shaganappi Trail was redistricted into Calgary-Varsity. Following the 2010 re-distribution, the Calgary-Mountain View had a population of 42,092, which was 2.96% above the provincial average of 40,880.

=== Boundary history ===
17 Calgary-Mountain View 2003 boundaries
Bordering districts
North	East	West	South
Calgary-North Hill and Calgary-Varsity	Calgary-East	Calgary-Bow	Calgary-Buffalo and Calgary-Fort
riding map goes here			
Legal description from the Statutes of Alberta 2003, Electoral Divisions Act.
Starting at the intersection of Home Road NW and Bowness Road NW; then 1. southeast along Bowness Road NW to 48 Street NW; 2. northeast along 48 Street NW to 23 Avenue NW; 3. southeast along 23 Avenue NW and its extension to Shaganappi Trail NW; 4. southeast along Shaganappi Trail NW to 16 Avenue NW; 5. east along 16 Avenue NW and 16 Avenue NE to Deerfoot Trail NE; 6. generally south and southeast along Deerfoot Trail NE to the Light Rail Transit (LRT) line; 7. west along the LRT line to the Canadian Pacific Railway line; 8. south along the railway line to the right bank of the Bow River; 9. generally west along the right bank of the Bow River to the southerly extension of Home Road NW (by Edworthy Park); 10. north along the extension and Home Road NW to the starting point.
Note:

21 Calgary-Mountain View 2010 boundaries
Bordering districts
North	East	West	South
Calgary-Cross, Calgary-Klein and Calgary-Varsity	Calgary-East	Calgary-Currie	Calgary-Buffalo and Calgary-Fort
Note: Boundary descriptions were not used in the 2010 redistribution

2023 Map for Calgary-Mountain View https://www.elections.ab.ca/uploads/2023_ED18_CALGARY_MOUNTAINVIEW_PUBLISHED.pdf

=== Representation history ===
Calgary-Mountain View
Assembly	Years	Member	Party
Riding created from Calgary-East and Calgary-North
17th	1971–1975	Albert Ludwig	Social Credit
18th	1975–1979	John Kushner	Progressive Conservative
19th	1979–1982	Stan Kushner	Progressive Conservative
20th	1982–1986	Bohdan Zip	Progressive Conservative
21st	1986–1989	Bob Hawkesworth	New Democratic
22nd	1989–1993	Bob Hawkesworth	New Democratic
23rd	1993–1997	Mark Hlady	Progressive Conservative
24th	1997–2001	Mark Hlady	Progressive Conservative
25th	2001–2004	Mark Hlady	Progressive Conservative
26th	2004–2008	David Swann	Liberal
27th	2008–2012	David Swann	Liberal
28th	2012–2015	David Swann	Liberal
29th	2015–2019	David Swann	Liberal
30th	2019–2023	Kathleen Ganley	New Democratic
31st	2023–Present	Kathleen Ganley	New Democratic

The electoral district was created in the 1971 boundary redistribution out of Calgary-East and Calgary-North. The predecessor ridings that comprised Mountain View had returned Social Credit candidates since they were created. The first election held that year returned former Calgary-East Social Credit MLA Albert Ludwig to the Assembly with over half of the popular vote.

Mountain View would see its first change of hands in the 1975 election as Progressive Conservative candidate John Kushner defeated Ludwig. He retired at dissolution of the Assembly in 1979 as he got the federal Progressive Conservative nomination for Calgary-East to run in the 1979 federal election.

The provincial election that year would return another Kushner to represent Mountain View. This time it was Stan Kushner, son of John Kushner. He held the district for the Progressive Conservatives, winning a majority of 55% of the vote. In 1981 he was charged with drunk driving; Kushner did not run for a second term. The 1982 election returned Progressive Conservative candidate Bohdan Zip who also only served a single term in office.

In the 1986 general election, voters would return NDP candidate Bob Hawkesworth over future Premier of Alberta Jim Prentice in a hotly contested race. He was re-elected in 1989 with a solid majority.

Hawkesworth would be defeated after two terms in the 1993 election by Progressive Conservative candidate Mark Hlady. He would win two more terms with increasing percentages of the vote in 1997 and 2001. In 2004, he was defeated by Liberal candidate David Swann.

Swann was re-elected to his second term in 2008 and became Leader of the Liberals after Kevin Taft resigned. He would resign the post himself in 2011 and be replaced by Raj Sherman.

== Legislative election results ==
=== Graphical summary ===
1971
11.88%	36.53%	51.59%
NDP	Progressive Conservative	Social Credit

1975
	9.39%	7.46%	49.23%	33.19%
C	NDP	Liberal	Progressive Conservative	Social Credit

1979
15.5%	8.97%	54.77%	21.16%
NDP	Liberal	Progressive Conservative	Social Credit

1982
27.07%	3%	5.7%	57.69%	6.2%
NDP	Lib	Ind	Progressive Conservative	WCC

1986
45.65%	9.41%	43.52%
NDP	Liberal	Progressive Conservative

1989
51.75%	14.89%	33.36%
NDP	Liberal	Progressive Conservative

1993
26.08%	22.36%	46.21%	3%
NDP	Liberal	Progressive Conservative	SC

1997
18.5%	29%	48.51%	4%
NDP	Liberal	Progressive Conservative	SC

2001
15.29%	24.37%	60.34%
NDP	Liberal	Progressive Conservative

2004
6.6%	5.3%	53.31%	30.43%	4.38%
Green	NDP	Liberal	Progressive Conservative	A

2008
6.3%	4%	51.51%	30.91%	6.5%
Green	NDP	Liberal	Progressive Conservative	W

2012
5%	41.09%	30.38%	22.22%
NDP	Liberal	Progressive Conservative	Wildrose

2015
28.88%	36.67%	23.92%	10.54%
NDP	Liberal	Progressive Conservative	Wildrose

2019
47.3%	5.6%	8.9%	36.7%
NDP	Liberal	Alberta	United Conservative

2023
64.7%	33.2%
NDP	United Conservative

=== 1971 ===
1971 Alberta general election
Party	Candidate	Votes	%	±%
Social Credit	Albert W. Ludwig	4,990	51.59%	–
Progressive Conservative	George Swales	3,533	36.53%	–
New Democratic	E.C. Baldwin	1,149	11.88%	–
Total		9,672	–	–
Rejected, spoiled and declined		91	–	–
Eligible electors / Turnout		14,291	68.32%	–
Social Credit pickup new district.				
Source(s) Source: "Calgary-Mountain View Official Results 1971 Alberta general election". Alberta Heritage Community Foundation.

=== 1975 ===
1975 Alberta general election
Party	Candidate	Votes	%	±%
Progressive Conservative	John Kushner	3,800	49.23%	12.70%
Social Credit	Albert W. Ludwig	2,562	33.19%	-18.40%
New Democratic	Orrin Kerr	725	9.39%	-2.49%
Liberal	John Sutherland	576	7.46%	–
Communist	Joe Hill	56	0.73%	–
Total		7,719	–	–
Rejected, spoiled and declined		74	–	–
Eligible electors / turnout		14,225	54.78%	-13.53%
Progressive Conservative gain from Social Credit		Swing		15.55%
Source(s) Source: "Calgary-Mountain View Official Results 1975 Alberta general election". Alberta Heritage Community Foundation.

=== 1979 ===
1979 Alberta general election
Party	Candidate	Votes	%	±%
Progressive Conservative	Stan Kushner	5,141	54.77%	5.54%
Social Credit	Scott Saville	1,986	21.16%	-12.03%
New Democratic	Martin Serediak	1,455	15.50%	6.11%
Liberal	John Donnachie	804	8.57%	1.10%
Total		9,386	–	–
Rejected, spoiled and declined		40	–	–
Eligible electors / turnout		19,782	47.65%	-7.13%
Progressive Conservative hold		Swing		8.79%
Source(s) Source: "Calgary-Mountain View Official Results 1979 Alberta general election". Alberta Heritage Community Foundation.

=== 1982 ===
1982 Alberta general election
Party	Candidate	Votes	%	±%
Progressive Conservative	Bohdan Zip	7,187	57.69%	2.92%
New Democratic	Phil Elder	3,372	27.07%	11.57%
Western Canada Concept	Stephen B. Keeling	772	6.20%	–
Independent	Diane Ablonczy	706	5.67%	–
Liberal	J. Curtis Joynt	420	3.37%	-5.19%
Total		12,457	–	–
Rejected, spoiled and declined		57	–	–
Eligible electors / turnout		20,678	60.52%	12.87%
Progressive Conservative hold		Swing		7.25%
Source(s) Source: "Calgary-Mountain View Official Results 1982 Alberta general election". Alberta Heritage Community Foundation.

=== 1986 ===
1986 Alberta general election
Party	Candidate	Votes	%	±%
New Democratic	Bob Hawkesworth	5,524	45.65%	18.58%
Progressive Conservative	Jim Prentice	5,267	43.52%	-14.17%
Liberal	Doug Rae	1,139	9.41%	6.04%
Independent	Tom Erhart	172	1.42%	–
Total		12,102	–	–
Rejected, spoiled and declined		36	–	–
Eligible electors / turnout		23,542	51.56%	-8.96%
New Democratic gain from Progressive Conservative		Swing		16.38%
Source(s) Source: "Calgary-Mountain View Official Results 1986 Alberta general election". Alberta Heritage Community Foundation.

=== 1989 ===
1989 Alberta general election
Party	Candidate	Votes	%	±%
New Democratic	Bob Hawkesworth	6,469	51.74%	6.10%
Progressive Conservative	Vicky Adamson	4,171	33.36%	-10.16%
Liberal	Kevin Murphy	1,862	14.89%	5.48%
Total		12,502	–	–
Rejected, spoiled and declined		52	–	–
Eligible electors / turnout		22,831	54.99%	3.43%
New Democratic hold		Swing		8.13%
Source(s) Source: "Calgary-Mountain View Official Results 1989 Alberta general election". Alberta Heritage Community Foundation.

=== 1993 ===
1993 Alberta general election
Party	Candidate	Votes	%	±%
Progressive Conservative	Mark Hlady	5,768	46.21%	12.85%
New Democratic	Bob Hawkesworth	3,255	26.08%	-25.67%
Liberal	Jonathan Horlick	2,791	22.36%	7.47%
Social Credit	George Clark	481	3.85%	–
Confederation of Regions	Bruce Jackman	116	0.93%	–
Natural Law	Alberta Scraba	71	0.57%	–
Total		12,482	–	–
Rejected, spoiled and declined		38	–	–
Eligible electors / turnout		23,408	53.49%	-1.50%
Progressive Conservative gain from New Democratic		Swing		20.76%
Source(s) Source: "Calgary-Mountain View Official Results 1993 Alberta general election". Alberta Heritage Community Foundation.

=== 1997 ===
1997 Alberta general election
Party	Candidate	Votes	%	±%
Progressive Conservative	Mark Hlady	5,468	48.51%	2.30%
Liberal	Patricia Ennis	3,269	29.00%	6.64%
New Democratic	Gordon M. Christie	2,085	18.50%	-7.58%
Social Credit	Jason Nicholas	450	3.99%	0.14%
Total		11,272	–	–
Rejected, spoiled and declined		34	45	2
Eligible electors / turnout		22,464	50.34%	-3.15%
Progressive Conservative hold		Swing		4.47%
Source(s) Source: Office of the Chief Electoral Officer (1997). The Report of the Chief Electoral Officer November, 1996 General Enumeration and Tuesday, March 11, 1997 General Election, Twenty-fourth Legislative Assembly. Edmonton: Alberta Legislative Assembly. ISSN 1483-1171. OCLC 1052543255.

=== 2001 ===
2001 Alberta general election
Party	Candidate	Votes	%	±%
Progressive Conservative	Mark Hlady	6,462	60.34%	11.83%
Liberal	Jennifer Spencer	2,610	24.37%	-4.63%
New Democratic	Keith Purdy	1,637	15.29%	-3.21%
Total		10,709	–	–
Rejected, spoiled and declined		12	25	7
Eligible electors / turnout		23,213	46.22%	-4.12%
Progressive Conservative hold		Swing		8.23%
Source(s) Source: Office of the Chief Electoral Officer (2001). The report of the Chief Electoral Officer on the 2000 provincial confirmation process and Monday, March 12, 2001, provincial general election of the twenty-fifth Legislative Assembly. Edmonton: Alberta Legislative Assembly. OCLC 51275133.

=== 2004 ===
2004 Alberta general election
Party	Candidate	Votes	%	±%
Liberal	David Swann	7,162	53.31%	28.94%
Progressive Conservative	Mark Hlady	4,088	30.43%	-29.91%
Green	Mark MacGillivray	884	6.58%	–
New Democratic	John Donovan	712	5.30%	-9.99%
Alberta Alliance	Ryan Cassell	589	4.38%	–
Total		13,435	–	–
Rejected, spoiled and declined		67	13	17
Eligible electors / turnout		27,299	49.52%	3.31%
Liberal gain from Progressive Conservative		Swing		29.43%
Source(s) Source: Office of the Chief Electoral Officer (2005). The Report of the Chief Electoral Officer on the 2004 Provincial Enumeration and Monday, November 22, 2004 Provincial General Election of the Twenty-sixth Legislative Assembly. Edmonton: Alberta Legislative Assembly. ISSN 1483-1171. OCLC 1052543255.

=== 2008 ===
2008 Alberta general election
Party	Candidate	Votes	%	±%
Liberal	David Swann	7,086	51.5%	-1.8%
Progressive Conservative	Leah Lawrence	4,252	30.9%	0.5%
Wildrose Alliance	Cory Morgan	892	6.5%	2.1%
Green	Juliet Burgess	865	6.3%	-0.3%
New Democratic	John Donovan	661	4.8%	-0.5%
Total		13,756	–	–
Rejected, spoiled and declined		45	33	8
Eligible electors / turnout		33,311	41.5%	-8.1%
Liberal hold		Swing		-1.1%
Source(s) Source: Office of the Chief Electoral Officer (2008). The Report on the March 3, 2008 Provincial General Election of the Twenty-Seventh Legislative Assembly. Edmonton: Alberta Legislative Assembly. pp. 238–241. ISSN 1483-1171.

=== 2012 ===
2012 Alberta general election
Party	Candidate	Votes	%	±%
Liberal	David Swann	6,918	40.23%	-11.28%
Progressive Conservative	Cecilia Low	5,270	30.65%	-0.26%
Wildrose	Shane McAllister	3,915	22.77%	16.28%
New Democratic	Christopher McMillan	863	5.02%	0.21%
Alberta Party	Inshan S. Mohammed	230	1.34%	–
Total		17,196	–	–
Rejected, spoiled and declined		105	51	6
Eligible electors / turnout		29,988	57.71%	16.26%
Liberal hold		Swing		-5.51%
Source(s) Source: "21 - Calgary-Mountain View, 2012 Alberta general election". officialresults.elections.ab.ca. Elections Alberta.

=== 2015 ===
2015 Alberta general election
Party	Candidate	Votes	%	±%
Liberal	David Swann	7,204	36.67%	-3.56%
New Democratic	Marc Andrew Chikinda	5,673	28.88%	23.86%
Progressive Conservative	Mark Hlady	4,699	23.92%	-6.73%
Wildrose	Terry Wong	2,070	10.54%	-12.23%
Total		19,646	–	–
Rejected, spoiled and declined		45	56	19
Eligible electors / turnout		36,236	54.39%	-3.32%
Liberal hold		Swing		-0.90%
Source(s) Source: "21 - Calgary-Mountain View, 2015 Alberta general election". officialresults.elections.ab.ca. Elections Alberta.

=== 2019 ===
2019 Alberta general election
Party	Candidate	Votes	%	±%
New Democratic	Kathleen Ganley	12,526	47.32%	18.45%
United Conservative	Jeremy Wong	9,708	36.68%	2.24%
Alberta Party	Angela Kokott	2,345	8.86%	–
Liberal	David Khan	1,474	5.57%	-31.10%
Green	Thana Boonlert	315	1.19%	–
Alberta Independence	Monica Friesz	102	0.39%	–
Total		26,470	–	–
Rejected, spoiled and declined		203	86	7
Eligible electors / turnout		38,316	69.63%	15.24%
New Democratic gain from Liberal		Swing		1.43%
Source(s) Source: "18 - Calgary-Mountain View, 2019 Alberta general election". officialresults.elections.ab.ca. Elections Alberta.

=== 2023 ===
2023 Alberta general election
Party	Candidate	Votes	%	±%
New Democratic	Kathleen Ganley	16,516	64.70	+17.38
United Conservative	Pamela Rath	8,468	33.17	-3.50
Liberal	Frances Woytkiw	335	1.31	-4.26
Solidarity Movement	Christopher Wedick	119	0.47	–
Pro-Life	Lucas Hernandez	90	0.35	–
Total		25,528	99.03	–
Rejected and declined		251	0.97	
Turnout		25,779	65.42	
Eligible voters		39,403		
New Democratic hold		Swing		+10.44
Source(s) Source: Elections Alberta

== Senate nominee election results ==
=== 2004 ===
2004 Senate nominee election results: Calgary-Mountain View				Turnout 50.71%	
Affiliation	Candidate	Votes	% votes	% ballots	Rank
Progressive Conservative	Jim Silye	4,022	15.06%	42.59%	5
Progressive Conservative	Bert Brown	3,841	14.38%	40.68%	1
Independent	Link Byfield	3,521	13.18%	37.29%	4
Progressive Conservative	Betty Unger	3,376	12.64%	35.75%	2
Independent	Tom Sindlinger	3,117	11.67%	33.09%	9
Progressive Conservative	David Usherwood	2,188	8.19%	23.17%	6
Progressive Conservative	Cliff Breitkreuz	1,935	7.24%	20.49%	3
Alberta Alliance	Vance Gough	1,702	6.37%	18.02%	8
Alberta Alliance	Michael Roth	1,614	6.04%	17.09%	7
Alberta Alliance	Gary Horan	1,398	5.23%	14.81%	10
Total votes		26,714	100%		
Total ballots		9,443	2.83 votes per ballot		
Rejected, spoiled and declined		4,401			

Voters had the option of selecting four candidates on the ballot

== Student vote results ==
=== 2004 ===
Participating schools
Foothills Academy
Hillhurst Community School
Langevin Science School
Queen Elizabeth Junior and Senior High School

On November 19, 2004, a student vote was conducted at participating Alberta schools to parallel the 2004 Alberta general election results. The vote was designed to educate students and simulate the electoral process for persons who have not yet reached the legal majority. The vote was conducted in 80 of the 83 provincial electoral districts with students voting for actual election candidates. Schools with a large student body that reside in another electoral district had the option to vote for candidates outside of the electoral district then where they were physically located.

2004 Alberta student vote results
Affiliation	Candidate	Votes	%
Green	Mark MacGillivray	237	29.37%
Progressive Conservative	Mark Hlady	198	24.54%
Liberal	David Swann	192	23.79%
NDP	John Donovan	126	15.61%
Alberta Alliance	Ryan Cassell	54	6.69%
Total		807	100%
Rejected, spoiled and declined		49	

== See also ==
- List of Alberta provincial electoral districts
- Canadian provincial electoral districts
