= John Kushner =

Canadian politician (1923–1984)

Member of the Legislative Assembly of Alberta
- In office March 26, 1975 – 1979
- Preceded by: Albert Ludwig
- Succeeded by: Stan Kushner
- Constituency: Calgary-Mountain View

Member of the Canadian Parliament for Calgary East
- In office May 22, 1979 – March 2, 1984
- Preceded by: Douglas Harkness (old district)
- Succeeded by: Alex Kindy

Personal details
- Born: June 22, 1923 Poland
- Died: March 2, 1984 (aged 60)
- Party: Progressive Conservative (Alberta); Progressive Conservative (federal)
- Spouse: Olga Komix
- Children: Jack, Stan (sons)
- Occupation: security officer, politician

John Kushner (June 22, 1923 – March 2, 1984) was a Canadian federal and provincial level politician. He served as a member of the Legislative Assembly of Alberta from 1975 to 1979 and then served as a Member of Parliament from 1979 until his death in 1984. He sat with the Progressive Conservative caucus on both the provincial and federal level.

== Early life ==
John Kushner was born in Poland on June 22, 1923. Prior to his political career he worked as a security officer.

After coming to Alberta he got a job with the Canadian Pacific Railway (CPR). He rose through the ranks of the Brotherhood of Railway Trainmen to the presidency of the local.

As well, he was president of the Calgary Labour Council in the 1960s.

Kushner was very active with many local organizations and served on the board of the Metro Calgary and Rural General Hospital District No. 93, 1969-1974.

== Family life ==
He and his wife, Olga Komix, 1928-2014, had two sons, Jack and Stan.

Stan was elected MLA for Calgary Mountainview after John stepped down in 1978 to enter federal politics.

== Political career ==
He was a Calgary alderman for Ward 5 from 1965 to 1967, and again from 1968 to 1974.

He was also a Public School Trustee, 1971-1974.

Kushner ran for a seat to the Alberta Legislature for the first time in the 1971 Alberta general election. He ran as a Progressive Conservative in the new electoral district of Calgary-McCall candidate and finished in second place out of four candidates losing to Social Credit candidate George Ho Lem.

Kushner made a second attempt to run for provincial office, this time running in the electoral district of Calgary-Mountain View in the 1975 Alberta general election. He defeated long time Social Credit incumbent Albert Ludwig and three other candidates in a hotly contested race to pick up the seat for the governing Progressive Conservative party.

Kushner served one term in the Legislative Assembly of Alberta before jumping to federal politics. He ran for a seat to the House of Commons of Canada in the federal electoral district of Calgary East in the 1979 Canadian federal election. He faced off against Ludwig who ran as a candidate for the federal Liberals and future Alberta MLA Barry Pashak and four other candidates. He won the district by a near landslide taking over 60% of the popular vote to pick up the new seat for the federal Progressive Conservatives.

The minority government of Prime Minister Joe Clark fell less than a year later. This forced the 1980 federal election to take place. Kushner ran against Ludwig and Pashak in a virtual rerun of the 1979 race. His margin of victory dropped by almost 10% but he still won the district by a wide margin defeating the seven other candidates in the race.

Kushner died late into his term on March 2, 1984.

== See also ==
"John Kushner" in Scoundrels and Scallywags : Characters from Alberta's Past / Brian Brennan. -- Calgary : Fifth House, 2002. p. 170-174

Kushner fonds at Glenbow Archives Call Numbers: M-7644, PA-2974, PB-727, PD-242
