= Yvonne Fritz =

Canadian politician

The Honourable Yvonne Fritz ECA

MLA for Calgary-Cross
- In office June 15, 1993 – May 5, 2015
- Preceded by: New district
- Succeeded by: Ricardo Miranda

Personal details
- Born: Yvonne Marie Fritz; September 17, 1950 (age 75) Saskatoon, Saskatchewan, Canada
- Party: Progressive Conservative
- Spouse: Lanny
- Occupation: Registered Nurse

Yvonne Marie Fritz ECA (born September 17, 1950) is a Canadian politician and former member of the Legislative Assembly of Alberta representing the constituency of Calgary-Cross as a Progressive Conservative.

She designed the flag of Calgary along with Gwin Clark.

== Early life ==
Fritz was born September 17, 1950, in Saskatoon and is of Métis heritage. Prior to entering politics, she worked as a Registered Nurse at Calgary General Hospital for 20 years.

== Political life ==
Fritz first sought public office in the 1986 Calgary municipal by-election for Ward 5 and was defeated in a very close race by Jon Havelock but was elected in the 1988 general election as the alderman for Ward 5. She served in that capacity until 1993 when she sought the position of MLA for the new constituency of Calgary-Cross. In the 1993 Alberta general election, Fritz was the successful candidate receiving 60% of the vote. In the subsequent elections in 1997 and 2001, she proved successful again, receiving 67% and 75% of the vote respectively. While sitting as a Private Member, she served on the Treasury Board and chaired both the Alberta Multicultural Commission and the Women's Breast Cancer Screening Council. She also sponsored three important Private Members' Bills, including a bill for mandatory bicycle helmet use for children and teenagers.

In the 2004 provincial election, Fritz secured her position as MLA for Calgary-Cross for a fourth time with 58% of the vote. Following the election, she was appointed as Minister for Seniors and Community Supports, a position she held until 2006. That year, Fritz became Chair of the Cabinet Policy Committee for Managing Growth Pressures. In 2007, Premier Stelmach appointed her as Associate Minister of Affordable Housing and Urban Development. In the 2008 provincial election, Fritz received 57% of the vote. In April 2008, she was sworn in as Minister of the newly created ministry of Housing and Urban Affairs.

== Personal life ==
Fritz is married to Lanny. The couple has two grown children. She has been a resident of the Pineridge community in Calgary for more than 33 years.

== Election results ==
2008 Alberta general election results (Calgary-Cross)		Turnout 27.4%	
Affiliation	Candidate	Votes	%
Progressive Conservative	Yvonne Fritz	4,011	57%
Liberal	Ron I. Reinhold	1,565	22%
Wildrose Alliance	Gordon Huth	605	9%
Green	Susan Stratton	394	6%
NDP	Shelina N. Hassanali	477	7%
2004 Alberta general election results (Calgary-Cross)		Turnout 29.7%	
Affiliation	Candidate	Votes	%
Progressive Conservative	Yvonne Fritz	3,770	58%
Liberal	Raleigh Dehaney	1,453	22%
Alberta Alliance	Gordon Huth	646	10%
Green	Ryan Richardson	271	4%
NDP	Jeanie Keebler	393	6%
2001 Alberta general election results (Calgary-Cross)		Turnout 41.6%	
Affiliation	Candidate	Votes	%
Progressive Conservative	Yvonne Fritz	6,816	75%
Liberal	Keith Jones	1,863	20%
NDP	Ramiro Mora	441	5%
1997 Alberta general election results (Calgary-Cross)		Turnout 40.7%	
Affiliation	Candidate	Votes	%
Progressive Conservative	Yvonne Fritz	5,964	67%
Liberal	Keith Jones	2,456	28%
Social Credit	Maurizio Terrigno	467	5%
1993 Alberta general election results (Calgary-Cross)		Turnout ?%	
Affiliation	Candidate	Votes	%
Progressive Conservative	Yvonne Fritz	6,449	60%
Liberal	Keith Hart	3,567	33%
NDP	Vinay Dey	686	6%
Natural Law	Neeraj Varma	86	1%

2012 Alberta general election: Calgary-Cross
Party	Candidate	Votes	%	±%
Progressive Conservative	Yvonne Fritz	5,357	44.65%	-12.17%
Wildrose	Happy Mann	4,557	37.98%	29.40%
Liberal	Narita Sherman	1,220	10.17%	-12.07%
New Democratic	Reinaldo Contreras	604	5.03%	-1.72%
Evergreen	Susan Stratton	260	2.17%	-3.42%
Total		11,998	–	–
Rejected, spoiled and declined		116	–	–
Eligible electors / turnout		27,680	43.76%	16.11%
Progressive Conservative hold		Swing		-13.96%
Source(s) Source: "06 - Calgary-Cross, 2012 Alberta general election". officialresults.elections.ab.ca. Elections Alberta.
