= Albert Ludwig =

Canadian politician (1919–2019)

Member of the Legislative Assembly of Alberta
- In office 1959–1975
- Constituency: Calgary North East (1959–63); Calgary East (1963–71); Calgary-Mountain View (1971–75)

Personal details
- Born: November 14, 1919 Melfort, Saskatchewan
- Died: February 16, 2019 (aged 99) Calgary, Alberta
- Party: Alberta Liberal Party; Liberal Party of Canada
- Occupation: lawyer, soldier

Albert Ludwig (November 14, 1919 – February 16, 2019) was a Canadian politician and World War II combat veteran, lawyer, judge and author from Alberta.

== Early life ==
Ludwig was born in 1919 in Melfort, Saskatchewan. Ludwig joined the Canadian Army in 1940, and transferred to the Royal Canadian Air Force in 1941. Albert was forced to abandon his plane over France.

== Political career ==
Ludwig served as a member of the Legislative Assembly of Alberta for the Social Credit Party of Alberta through four terms from 1959 to 1975. As Minister of Public Works, Ludwig led efforts on behalf of the Government of Alberta to preserve Rutherford House following the University of Alberta's decision to demolish the historic home. Ludwig was nominated in the 1975 Alberta general election but due to his wife's terminal illness that year he did not campaign and therefore lost the election to John Kushner. After this election he left politics to practice law.

Ludwig did not limit himself to provincial politics. He ran twice federally in Calgary East for the Liberal Party of Canada, he lost both times again to John Kushner who also left provincial politics to run federally. After failing to gain office federally he was appointed as a Judge to the Provincial Criminal Court of Alberta and served that position from 1980 until his retirement 1989.

Ludwig was nominated as the Liberal candidate in Calgary Foothills only days before the 1997 Alberta general election but was unable to regain a seat in the legislature and was defeated by incumbent Pat Black.

Ludwig was also a co-author of The Canadian Creed, along with Robert E. Kulhawy He died in February 2019 at the age of 99.

Legislative Assembly of Alberta
Preceded by New District	MLA Calgary North East; 1959–1963	Succeeded by District Abolished
Preceded by New District	MLA Calgary East; 1963–1971	Succeeded by Moe Amery
Preceded by New District	MLA Calgary Mountain View; 1971–1975	Succeeded by John Kushner
