= Ricardo Miranda =

Canadian politician and trade unionist (born 1976)

The Honourable Ricardo Miranda ECA
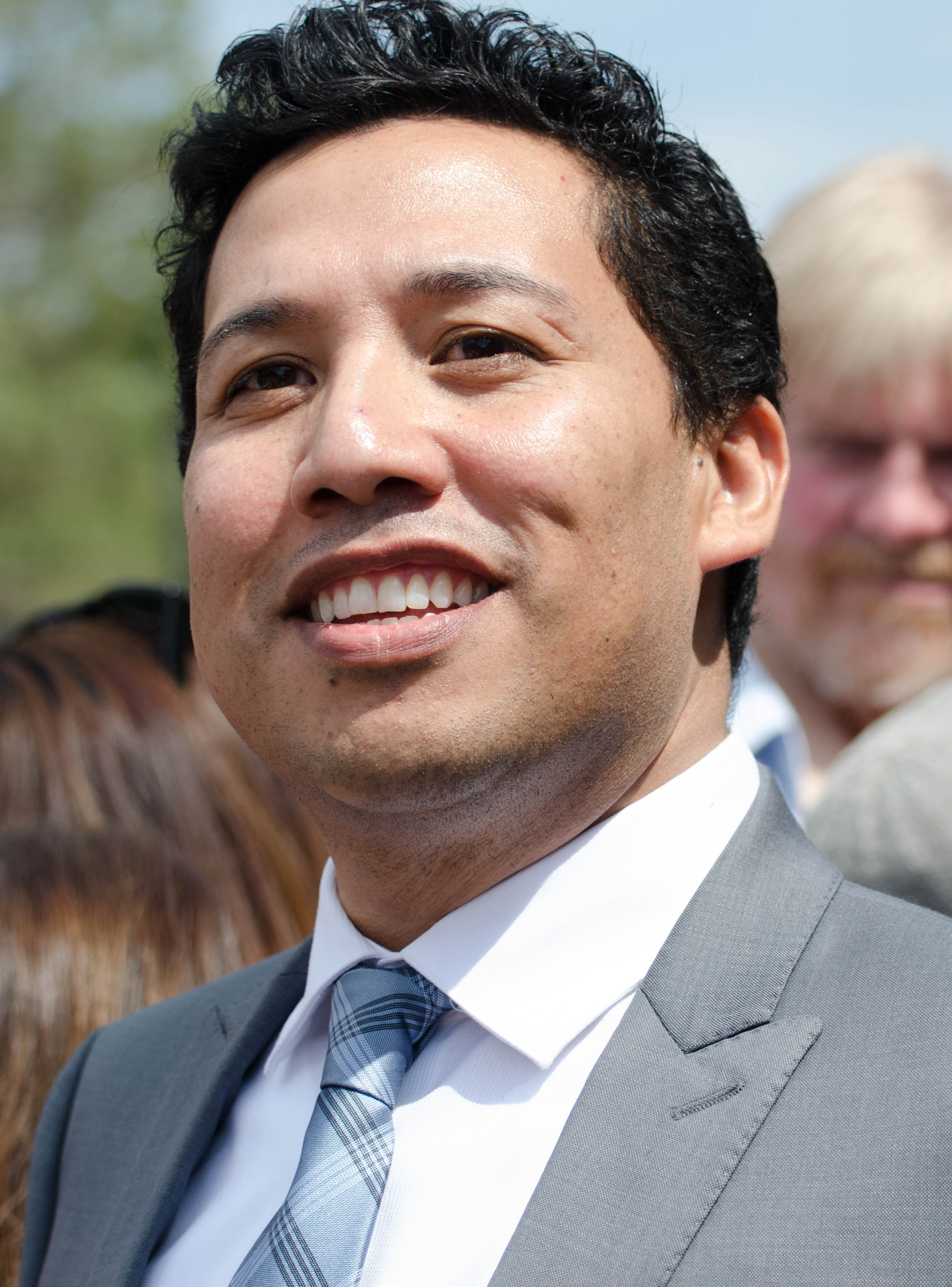
- Miranda in May 2015

Alberta Minister of Culture and Tourism
- In office February 2, 2016 – April 30, 2019
- Preceded by: David Eggen
- Succeeded by: Leela Aheer

Member of the Legislative Assembly of Alberta for Calgary-Cross
- In office May 5, 2015 – April 16, 2019
- Preceded by: Yvonne Fritz
- Succeeded by: Mickey Amery

Personal details
- Born: August 22, 1976 (age 50) Managua, Nicaragua
- Party: Alberta New Democratic Party
- Education: University of Calgary
- Occupation: Researcher

Ricardo Miranda ECA (born August 22, 1976) is a Canadian politician and trade unionist who was elected to the Legislative Assembly of Alberta in the 2015 Alberta general election representing the electoral district of Calgary-Cross.

On February 2, 2016, Miranda was appointed Alberta's Minister of Culture and Tourism.

== Before politics ==
Miranda was born in Managua, Nicaragua, and is Jewish. In 1988, Miranda left war-torn Nicaragua immigrating to Canada as a refugee when he was just 10-years-old. He graduated from Father Lacombe High School in Calgary, and went on to complete a Bachelor of Arts degree from the University of Calgary.

Miranda engaged for several years in activism for various workers' rights organizations. While employed as a flight attendant for Air Canada, he was elected president of his local union, one of the largest within the Canadian Union of Public Employees. He went on to work for CUPE as a researcher in the Alberta office of CUPE National, where he met and worked with Louis Arab, husband of the incumbent premier and Alberta NDP leader the Hon. Rachel Notley. As a CUPE researcher, Miranda also contributed to public policy as a board member of the Parkland Institute, an Edmonton-based public policy think tank based in the Faculty of Arts at the University of Alberta.

== Political career ==
Miranda's entry into politics came after encouragement by Alberta NDP leader Rachel Notley, who suggested he may run for the Alberta NDP party. Previously, Miranda had served as a member of various committees, including the Standing Committee on the Alberta Heritage Savings Trust Fund and the Select Special Ethics and Accountability Committee. He also served as chair of the Standing Committee on Alberta's Economic Future.

He was elected as an MLA in the 2015 Alberta general election, becoming one of the first three openly LGBT politicians elected to the provincial legislature, alongside caucus colleagues Michael Connolly and Estefan Cortes-Vargas. In February 2016, Miranda was appointed as Alberta's Minister of Culture and Tourism in a provincial government headed by Notley.

He was defeated in the 2019 provincial election.

== Personal life ==
Miranda is openly gay. In addition to belonging to a sexual minority group, Miranda has variously spoken publicly about the difficulties of his early life fleeing war and persecution, and has been the voice of Judaism in the legislature, rising to inform on the occasion of various Jewish holidays.

Miranda became Alberta's first cabinet minister to be married in a same-sex wedding. In a marriage ceremony held on December 28, 2018 in Calgary's Glenbow Museum, Miranda married boyfriend and partner Christopher Brown. He had met Brown early in 2018. The marriage ceremony of Miranda and Brown was officiated by Alberta Premier Rachel Notley.

== Electoral history ==
2019 Alberta general election: Calgary-Cross
Party	Candidate	Votes	%	±%	Expenditures
United Conservative	Mickey Amery	8,907	54.26	+2.75†	$39,209
New Democratic	Ricardo Miranda	6,135	37.38	+1.25	$54,925
Alberta Party	Braham Luddu	962	5.86	–	$6,936
Liberal	Naser Kukhun	410	2.50	-6.88	$4,299
Total		16,414	99.27	–	
Rejected, spoiled and declined		121	0.73	–	
Turnout		16,535	53.61		
Eligible voters		30,844			
United Conservative notional hold		Swing		-2.25	
Source(s) Source: Elections Alberta Note: Expenses is the sum of "Election Expenses", "Other Expenses" and "Transfers Issued". The Elections Act limits "Election Expenses" to $50,000. †Comparison for UCP is to the combined Wildrose & PC redistributed vote in 2015

2015 Alberta general election: Calgary-Cross
Party	Candidate	Votes	%	±%
New Democratic	Ricardo Miranda	4,602	36.13%	31.10%
Progressive Conservative	Rick Hanson	4,501	35.34%	-9.31%
Wildrose	Moiz Mahmood	2,060	16.17%	-21.81%
Liberal	Manjot Singh Gill	1,194	9.38%	-0.79%
Green	Peter Meic	236	1.85%	0.32%
Independent	Katherine Le Rougetel †	143	1.12%	–
Total		12,736	–	–
Rejected, spoiled and declined		98	–	–
Eligible electors / turnout		31,535	40.70%	-3.07%
New Democratic gain from Progressive Conservative		Swing		-2.94%
Source(s) Source: "06 - Calgary-Cross, 2015 Alberta general election". officialresults.elections.ab.ca. Elections Alberta. †Le Rougetel was a candidate of the unregistered Communist League. See Ryan Rumbolt, "Communist League candidate Katherine LeRougetel enters mayoral race", Calgary Herald, 5 March 2017, accessed 8 March 2017.
