= Stan Kushner =

Canadian politician

Member of the Legislative Assembly of Alberta for Calgary Mountain View
- In office 1979–1982
- Preceded by: John Kushner
- Succeeded by: Bohdan Zip

Personal details
- Born: December 5, 1946 (age 79) Calgary, Alberta
- Party: Progressive Conservative Association of Alberta
- Parent(s): John Kushner (father); Olga Komix (mother)

Stanley A. Kushner (born December 5, 1946) is a former politician and current real estate agent in Alberta, Canada.

== Political career ==
Stan Kushner was elected to the Legislative Assembly of Alberta in the 1979 Alberta general election and held the district for one for the Progressive Conservative Association of Alberta as a back bench member in the assembly before leaving politics. Stan served on numerous committees of the Alberta Legislature while in office.

Kushner was formerly the Broker, General Manager and Owner of MaxWell Capital Realty, a large successful multi office real estate agency in Calgary, Alberta. His father was former Member of Parliament John Kushner.

He is Past Director of the Calgary Real Estate Board, Past Chair of the Calgary Real Estate Board Governance Committee, former member of the Calgary Real Estate Board Professional Standards Committee, former director of the Alberta Real Estate Association and former member of the Victoria Real Estate Board Business Practices Committee and the Vancouver Island Real Estate Board MLS Committee. Stan also served on two committees of the Real Estate Council of Alberta before becoming appointed to the Real Estate Council of Alberta by the Calgary Real Estate Board and the Alberta Real Estate Association.

Kushner previously sat on the Real Estate Council of Alberta a body charged with enforcing the Real Estate Act of Alberta, protecting the consumers best interests and at the same time, ensuring quality within the real estate industry by working with the Alberta Real Estate Association and the various real estate boards throughout Alberta. Stan is currently a member of the Real Estate Council Hearing Committee.
