= Bohdan Zip =

Canadian politician

Bud Zip

Member of the Legislative Assembly of Alberta
- In office 1982–1986
- Preceded by: Stan Kushner
- Succeeded by: Bob Hawkesworth
- Constituency: Calgary Mountain View

Personal details
- Born: March 5, 1929 Yellow Creek, Saskatchewan
- Died: April 19, 2017 (aged 88) Calgary, Alberta
- Party: Progressive Conservative Association of Alberta
- Spouse(s): Polly Misiewich m. 17 Jul 1954
- Education: University of Saskatchewan; University of Toronto
- Occupation: politician

Bohdan "Bud" Zip (March 5, 1929 – April 19, 2017) was a politician from Alberta, Canada. He served as a member of the Legislative Assembly of Alberta from 1982 to 1986.

== Early life ==
Bohdan Zip was born in 1929 in the community of Yellow Creek, Saskatchewan.

== Ukrainian community ==
Bohdan was actively involved in Calgary's Ukrainian community during the 1970s. He served as chairman of the board for St. Vladimir's Ukrainian Greek-Orthodox Church. In 1976, he helped acquire funding to build a Ukrainian Cultural Centre in Calgary.

== Political career ==
In the 1982 Alberta provincial election Bohdan was elected to the Legislative Assembly of Alberta for Calgary Mountain View for the Progressive Conservative Association of Alberta. He retired after serving one term as a back bench member. Zip died in Calgary in 2017 at the age of 88.

Legislative Assembly of Alberta
Preceded by Stan Kushner	MLA Calgary Mountain View; 1982-1986	Succeeded by Bob Hawkesworth
