= Mark Hlady =

Canadian businessman and politician

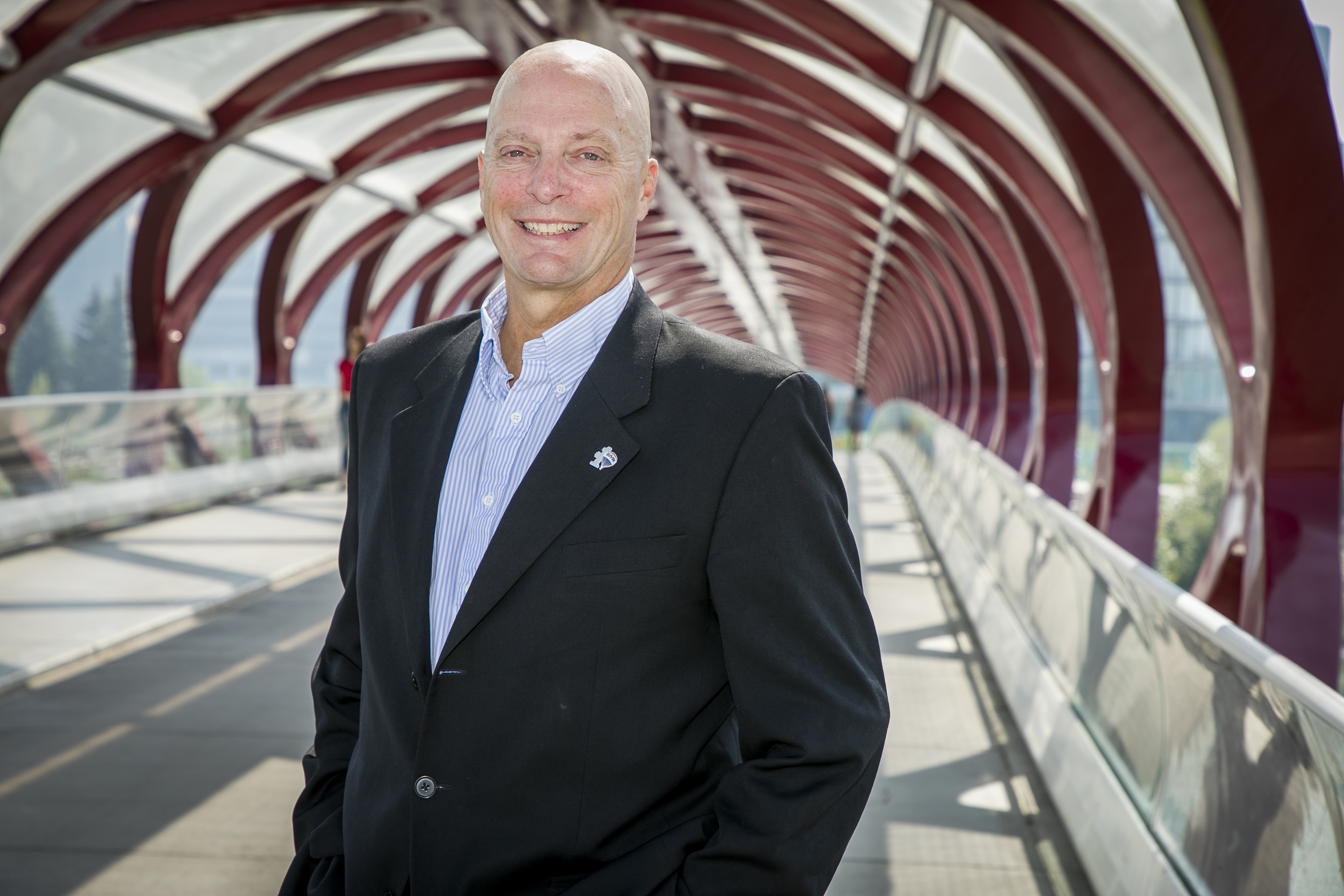
- Mark Hlady standing on the Calgary Peace Bridge in his home riding of Calgary-Mountain View in 2018

Member of the Legislative Assembly of Alberta for Calgary Mountain View
- In office June 15, 1993 – November 22, 2004
- Preceded by: Bob Hawkesworth
- Succeeded by: David Swann

Personal details
- Born: March 4, 1959 (age 67) Fort William, Ontario, Canada
- Party: Progressive Conservative Association of Alberta

Mark Everett Hlady (born March 4, 1959) is a Canadian businessman and politician and a former member of the Legislative Assembly of Alberta.

Hlady was elected in the 1993 general election as a Progressive Conservative in the riding of Calgary-Mountain View, defeating New Democrat Bob Hawkesworth. Hlady kept his seat in the 1997 and 2001 elections, but was defeated in 2004 by Liberal contender David Swann. During his term as an MLA, Hlady served on many oil and gas related committees.

He is currently seeking the 2018 United Conservative Party nomination in the Calgary-Mountain View riding.

== Background ==
Hlady was born in Fort William, Ontario. In 1979 he moved to Calgary to work for the family home improvement business and has lived there ever since. He was educated at the University of Calgary and graduated with a Physical Education degree in 1990.

Since Hlady graduated, he completed the Canadian Securities Course and became a stockbroker. Hlady earned his Real Estate License in 2016 and is currently a Remax Real Estate Central agent.

He is currently the Head Coach of the University of Calgary Triathlon club which he founded in 1986.

== Political career ==
In the fall of 1992, he was asked to work on Ralph Klein’s leadership campaign. After Klein won the leadership race, Hlady was encouraged to run in Calgary-Mountain View against incumbent Bob Hawkesworth. During what is now known as "the miracle on the prairies", the party overcame a significant gap in popular support, behind the opposition Alberta Liberal Party, to win the 1993 election. As an MLA, Hlady helped secure funding and supported initiatives such as the building of the Bow Valley Seniors Lodge, Wing Kei Care Centre, Soccer Fields in Renfrew and school playgrounds across the constituency.

Hlady was one of the youngest MLAs in Alberta's history.

He ran as the party's candidate in the same district in the 2015 provincial election, but was not reelected.

Hlady is currently seeking the 2018 United Conservative Party nomination in the Calgary-Mountain View constituency.

2015 Alberta general election: Calgary-Mountain View
Party	Candidate	Votes	%	±%
Liberal	David Swann	7,204	36.67%	-3.56%
New Democratic	Marc Andrew Chikinda	5,673	28.88%	23.86%
Progressive Conservative	Mark Hlady	4,699	23.92%	-6.73%
Wildrose	Terry Wong	2,070	10.54%	-12.23%
Total		19,646	–	–
Rejected, spoiled and declined		45	56	19
Eligible electors / turnout		36,236	54.39%	-3.32%
Liberal hold		Swing		-0.90%
Source(s) Source: "21 - Calgary-Mountain View, 2015 Alberta general election". officialresults.elections.ab.ca. Elections Alberta.
