= John Zaozirny =

Canadian politician

John Brian Zaozirny

Member of the Legislative Assembly of Alberta
- In office 1979–1986
- Preceded by: New District
- Succeeded by: Barry Pashak
- Constituency: Calgary-Forest Lawn

Minister of Energy and Natural Resources
- In office 1979–1986
- Preceded by: Merv Leitch
- Succeeded by: Neil Webber

Personal details
- Born: June 26, 1947 (age 78) Calgary, Alberta
- Party: Progressive Conservative
- Occupation: Businessman

John Brian Zaozirny (born June 26, 1947) is a businessman, lawyer and politician from Alberta, Canada. He served in the Legislative Assembly of Alberta from 1979 to 1986 and served as the Minister of Energy from 1982 to 1986.

== Political career ==
Zaozirny first ran for a seat to the Alberta Legislature in the 1979 Alberta general election as a Progressive Conservative candidate. He defeated five other candidates in the new electoral district of Calgary-Forest Lawn. In the 1982 general election he won by a massive landslide and nearly doubled his plurality from the 1979 election.

After the 1982 election Premier Peter Lougheed appointed Zaozirny Minister of Energy and Natural Resources. On behalf of the Government of Alberta he negotiated the end to the National Energy Program which resulted in the Western Energy Accord. For this the Alberta Chamber of Resources named him Resource Man of The Year in 1985. Zaozirny remained Minister of Energy after Don Getty became Premier in 1985. He retired from provincial politics at dissolution of the Legislature in 1986.

== Business career ==
After leaving politics, Zaozirny joined the law firm of Russell & DuMoulin as a partner. Less than a year later he joined McCarthy Tétrault LLP as counsel in its corporate finance, mergers and acquisitions group for Calgary and Vancouver. In 1987 the University of Calgary gave him its Distinguished Alumni award.

In 1988 Zaozirny joined Pengrowth Energy Corporation's board of directors and continues to serve with the company as chairman of the board of directors. He is also Vice Chair and Director of Canaccord Capital and a director of a number of other public companies.
