= Calgary-East =

Provincial electoral district in Alberta, Canada

Coordinates: 51.05°N 113.97°W

Alberta electoral district
- Calgary-East within the City of Calgary, 2017 boundaries

Provincial electoral district
- Legislature: Legislative Assembly of Alberta
MLA
Peter Singh
United Conservative
- District created: 1963
- District abolished: 1971
- District re-created: 1993
- First contested: 1963, 1993
- Last contested: 1967, 2023

Calgary-East (formally styled Calgary East) is a provincial electoral district in Alberta, Canada. The district is mandated to return a single member to the Legislative Assembly of Alberta.

Calgary-East has existed twice, the first incarnation was created from Calgary North East in the redistribution of 1963. The riding was abolished in 1971 when it became Calgary-McCall. The return of Calgary-East happened in the 1993 boundary redistribution when Calgary-Forest Lawn and half of Calgary-Millican were merged.

This riding covers the central north east portion of Calgary and contains the neighbourhoods of Vista Heights, Rundle, Marlborough and Mayland Heights.

Three MLAs have held this riding to date. The first Calgary East was represented by Social Credit MLA Albert Ludwig and the second Calgary-East solidly supported Progressive Conservative candidate Moe Amery, until the 2015 Alberta election when the riding was won by NDP candidate Robyn Luff.

== History ==
The original Calgary East electoral district was created in the 1963 boundary redistribution out of Calgary North East. It was abolished in 1971 and split between the new districts of Calgary-McCall and Calgary-Millican. The riding was re-created as Calgary-East in the 1993 boundary redistribution when most of Millican and Calgary-Forest Lawn were merged.

The 2010 boundary redistribution saw the eastern boundary extended east to 68 Street NE into land that was part of old Calgary-Montrose electoral district. The northern boundary cut off all land north of 16 Avenue NE and ceded it to Calgary-Cross. This change also resulted in East picking up some land that had been in old Calgary-North Hill.

=== Boundary history ===
6 Calgary-East 2003 boundaries
Bordering districts
North	East	West	South
Calgary-Cross, Calgary-McCall	Calgary-Montrose	Calgary-Mountain View, Calgary-North Hill	Calgary-Fort
riding map goes here			
Legal description from the Statutes of Alberta 2003, Electoral Divisions Act.
Starting at the intersection of 19 Street NE with 16 Avenue NE; then 1. east along 16 Avenue NE to Barlow Trail NE; 2. north along Barlow Trail NE to 32 Avenue NE; 3. east along 32 Avenue NE to 52 Street NE; 4. south along 52 Street NE to 8 Avenue SE; 5. west along 8 Avenue SE to 36 Street SE; 6. south along 36 Street SE to 26 Avenue SE; 7. west along 26 Avenue SE and its extension to the right bank of the Bow River; 8. northwest along the right bank of the Bow River to the Canadian Pacific Railway line; 9. north along the Canadian Pacific Railway line to the Light Rail Transit (LRT) line; 10. east along the LRT line to Deerfoot Trail NE; 11. north along Deerfoot Trail NE to 8 Avenue NE; 12. east along 8 Avenue NE to 19 Street NE; 13. north along 19 Street NE to the starting point.
Note:

8 Calgary-East 2010 boundaries
Bordering districts
North	East	West	South
Calgary-Cross	Calgary-Green Way	Calgary-Klein and Calgary-Mountain View	Calgary-Fort
Legal description from the Statutes of Alberta 2010, Electoral Divisions Act.

=== Representation history ===
Members of the Legislative Assembly for Calgary-East
Assembly	Years	Member	Party
See Calgary North East 1959–1963
16th	1963–1967	Albert Ludwig	Social Credit
17th	1967–1971	Albert Ludwig	Social Credit
See Calgary-McCall 1971–present and Calgary-Millican 1971–1993
See Calgary-Forest Lawn and Calgary-Millican 1971–1993
23rd	1993–1997	Moe Amery	Progressive; Conservative
24th	1997–2001	Moe Amery	Progressive; Conservative
25th	2001–2004	Moe Amery	Progressive; Conservative
26th	2004–2008	Moe Amery	Progressive; Conservative
27th	2008–2012	Moe Amery	Progressive; Conservative
28th	2012–2015	Moe Amery	Progressive; Conservative
29th	2015–2018	Robyn Luff	New Democratic
29th	2018–2019	Robyn Luff	Independent
30th	2019–2023	Peter Singh	United Conservative
31st	2023–present	Peter Singh	United Conservative

The first electoral district of Calgary East was created in the boundary redistribution in 1963. The first and only member to represent the old district was Social Credit Member of the Legislative Assembly Albert Ludwig who had been the incumbent in the predecessor riding of Calgary North East.

The 1963 general election saw Ludwig win a super majority taking over 60% of the popular vote. He was re-elected again in the 1967 election winning just over half of the vote. He held the riding until was abolished in 1971.

The second Calgary-East was created in 1993 from a few different riding's. The election in 1993 saw Progressive Conservative candidate Moe Amery defeat former Calgary-Forest Lawn NDP incumbent Barry Pashak to pick up the new district. This was the third time these two candidates had run against each other.

Amery has since been returned to the district four more times.

== Legislative election results ==
=== 1963 ===
1963 Alberta general election
Party	Candidate	Votes	%	±%
Social Credit	Albert W. Ludwig	4,763	60.37%	–
Progressive Conservative	Bill Duncan	1,497	18.97%	–
New Democratic	Dick Dunlop	953	12.08%	–
Liberal	Evelyn Leew	677	8.58%	–
Total		7,890	–	–
Rejected, spoiled and declined		18	–	–
Eligible electors / Turnout		17,729	44.60%	–
Social Credit pickup new district.				
Source(s) Source: "Calgary-East Official Results 1963 Alberta general election". Alberta Heritage Community Foundation.

=== 1967 ===
1967 Alberta general election
Party	Candidate	Votes	%	±%
Social Credit	Albert W. Ludwig	5,563	50.88%	-9.49%
Progressive Conservative	Jim Crawford	2,613	23.90%	4.92%
New Democratic	Kurt Gebauer	1,955	17.88%	5.80%
Liberal	Sandy Skoryko	803	7.34%	-1.24%
Total		10,934	–	–
Rejected, spoiled and declined		98	–	–
Eligible electors / Turnout		20,779	53.09%	8.49%
Social Credit hold		Swing		-7.21%
Source(s) Source: "Calgary-East Official Results 1967 Alberta general election". Alberta Heritage Community Foundation.

=== 1993–present ===
1993 Alberta general election
Party	Candidate	Votes	%	±%
Progressive Conservative	Moe Amery	5,503	54.48%	–
New Democratic	Barry Pashak	2,306	22.83%	–
Liberal	Dale Muti	1,689	16.72%	–
Social Credit	Lera G. Shirley	366	3.62%	–
Independent	Alain Horchower	237	2.35%	–
Total		10,101	–	–
Rejected, spoiled and declined		34	–	–
Eligible electors / turnout		20,638	49.11%	–
Progressive Conservative pickup new district.				
Source(s) Source: "Calgary-East Official Results 1993 Alberta general election". Alberta Heritage Community Foundation.

1997 Alberta general election
Party	Candidate	Votes	%	±%
Progressive Conservative	Moe Amery	4,857	60.19%	5.71%
Liberal	Kelly McDonnell	1,990	24.66%	7.94%
Social Credit	Raymond (Chick) Hurst	613	7.60%	3.97%
New Democratic	Marg Elliot	609	7.55%	-15.28%
Total		8,069	–	–
Rejected, spoiled and declined		50	15	6
Eligible electors / turnout		21,214	38.30%	-10.81%
Progressive Conservative hold		Swing		1.94%
Source(s) Source: "Calgary-East Official Results 1997 Alberta general election". Alberta Heritage Community Foundation. Alberta. Chief Electoral Officer (1997). Report of the Chief Electoral Officer, November, 1996 general enumeration and Tuesday, March 11, 1997 general election Twenty-fourth Legislative Assembly. Edmonton: Alberta Legislative Assembly, Office of the Chief Electoral Officer. pp. 100–101.

2001 Alberta general election
Party	Candidate	Votes	%	±%
Progressive Conservative	Moe Amery	6,038	70.82%	10.63%
Liberal	Brendan Dunphy	2,010	23.57%	-1.09%
New Democratic	Giorgio Cattabeni	328	3.85%	-3.70%
Social Credit	Alan Schoonover	109	1.28%	-6.32%
Communist	Jason Devine	41	0.48%	–
Total		8,526	–	–
Rejected, spoiled and declined		27	15	33
Eligible electors / turnout		20,509	41.86%	3.56%
Progressive Conservative hold		Swing		5.86%
Source(s) Source: "Calgary-East Official Results 2001 Alberta general election". Alberta Heritage Community Foundation. Alberta. Chief Electoral Officer (2001). The report of the Chief Electoral Officer on the 2000 provincial confirmation process and Monday, March 12, 2001, Provincial General Election of the twenty-fifth Legislative Assembly. Edmonton: Alberta Legislative Assembly, Office of the Chief Electoral Officer. pp. 72–73.

2004 Alberta general election
Party	Candidate	Votes	%	±%
Progressive Conservative	Moe Amery	4,484	53.82%	-17.00%
Liberal	Bill Harvey	2,357	28.29%	4.71%
Alberta Alliance	Brad Berard	606	7.27%	–
New Democratic	Paul Vargis	464	5.57%	1.72%
Green	Rick Michalenko	365	4.38%	–
Communist	Bonnie-Jean Collins	56	0.67%	0.19%
Total		8,332	–	–
Rejected, spoiled and declined		56	43	3
Eligible electors / turnout		22,759	36.87%	-5.00%
Progressive Conservative hold		Swing		-10.86%
Source(s) Source: "Calgary-East Statement of Official Results 2004 Alberta general election" (PDF). Elections Alberta. Alberta. Chief Electoral Officer (2005). Report of the Chief Electoral Officer on the General Enumeration and General Election of the Twenty-sixth Legislative Assembly (Report). Edmonton: Alberta Legislative Assembly, Office of the Chief Electoral Officer. pp. 100–103.

2008 Alberta general election
Party	Candidate	Votes	%	±%
Progressive Conservative	Moe Amery	4,583	53.85%	0.04%
Liberal	Bill Harvey	2,433	28.59%	0.30%
Wildrose Alliance	Mike McCracken	681	8.00%	0.73%
New Democratic	Christopher Dovey	425	4.99%	-0.57%
Green	Ross Cameron	333	3.91%	-0.47%
Communist	Bonnie-Jean Collins	55	0.65%	-0.03%
Total		8,510	–	–
Rejected, spoiled and declined		37	24	11
Eligible electors / turnout		28,616	29.99%	–
Progressive Conservative hold		Swing		-0.13%
Source(s) Source: "06 - Calgary-East, 2008 Alberta general election". officialresults.elections.ab.ca. Elections Alberta. Chief Electoral Officer (2008). The Report on the March 3, 2008 Provincial General Election of the Twenty-Seventh Legislative Assembly (Report). Edmonton, Alta.: Elections Alberta. pp. 190–193.

2012 Alberta general election
Party	Candidate	Votes	%	±%
Progressive Conservative	Moe Amery	5,924	45.57%	-8.29%
Wildrose Alliance	Jasbir (Jesse) Minhas	4,995	38.42%	30.42%
New Democratic	Robyn Luff	1,136	8.74%	3.74%
Liberal	Ali Abdulbaki	780	6.00%	-22.59%
Communist	Bonnie Devine	166	1.28%	0.63%
Total		13,001	–	–
Rejected, spoiled and declined		143	42	29
Eligible electors / turnout		30,196	43.62%	11.27%
Progressive Conservative hold		Swing		-9.06%
Source(s) Source: "08 - Calgary-East, 2012 Alberta general election". officialresults.elections.ab.ca. Elections Alberta. Chief Electoral Officer (2012). The Report of the Chief Electoral Officer on the 2011 Provincial Enumeration and Monday, April 23, 2012 Provincial General Election of the Twenty-eighth Legislative Assembly (PDF) (Report). Edmonton, Alta.: Elections Alberta. pp. 120–123. Archived (PDF) from the original on May 6, 2021.

2015 Alberta general election
Party	Candidate	Votes	%	±%
New Democratic	Robyn Luff	5,506	39.18%	30.44%
Progressive Conservative	Moe Amery	3,971	28.26%	-17.31%
Wildrose	Ali Waissi	3,633	25.85%	-12.57%
Liberal	Naser Al-Kukhun	806	5.74%	-0.26%
Communist	Bonnie Devine	138	0.98%	-0.29%
Total		14,054	–	–
Rejected, spoiled and declined		61	40	32
Eligible electors / turnout		34,585	40.91%	-2.72%
New Democratic gain from Progressive Conservative		Swing		1.89%
Source(s) Source: "08 - Calgary-East, 2015 Alberta general election". officialresults.elections.ab.ca. Elections Alberta. Chief Electoral Officer (2016). 2015 General Election. A Report of the Chief Electoral Officer (PDF) (Report). Edmonton, Alta.: Elections Alberta. pp. 116–120.

2015 Alberta general election redistributed results
Party	Votes	%
New Democratic	5,177	40.49
Progressive Conservative	3,573	27.95
Wildrose	3,364	26.31
Liberal	460	3.60
Alberta Party	156	1.22
Communist	55	0.43
Source(s) Source: Ridingbuilder

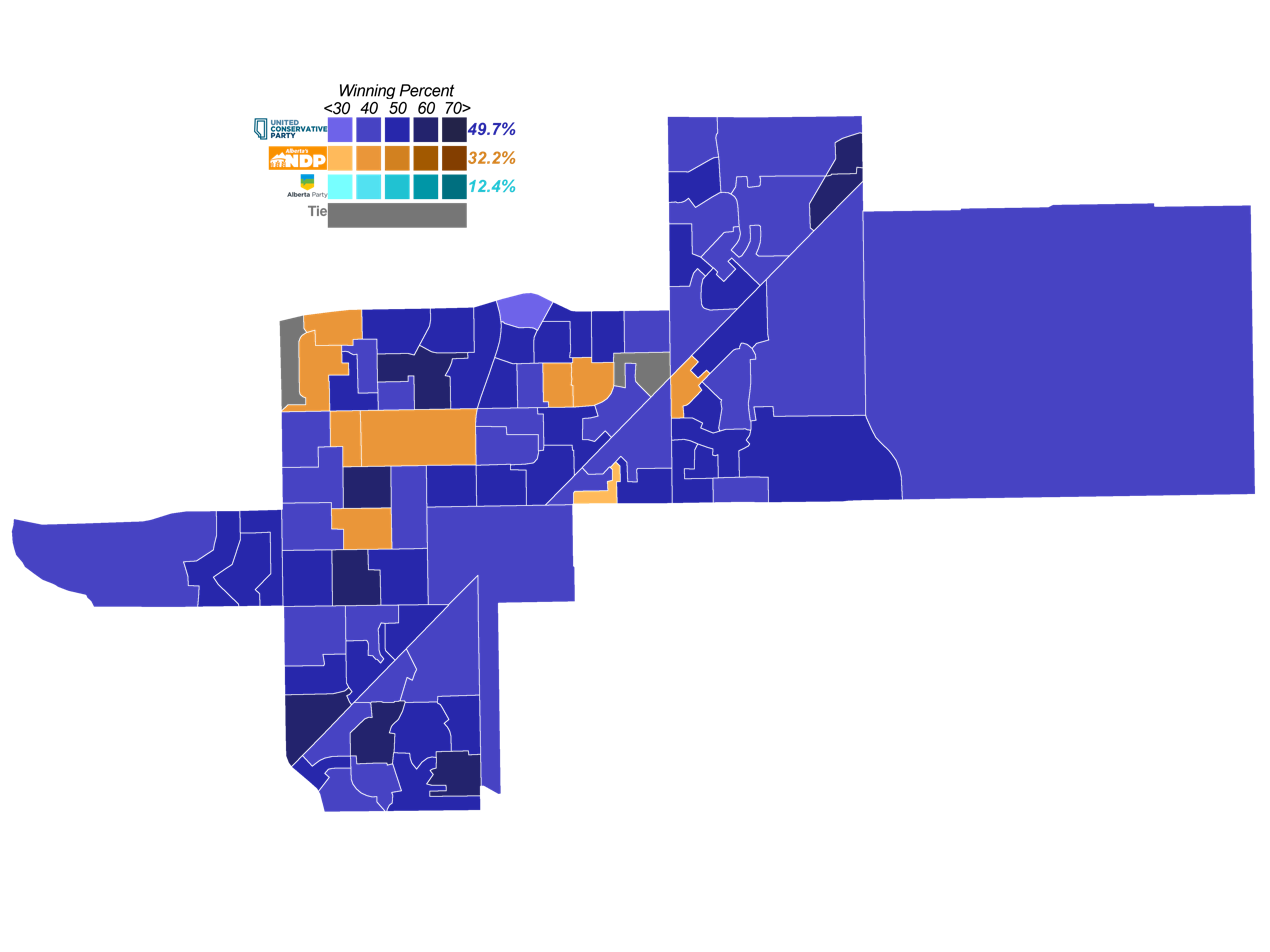
Results by Polling Division

2019 Alberta general election
Party	Candidate	Votes	%	±%	Expenditures
United Conservative	Peter Singh	7,520	49.72	-4.54	$33,681
New Democratic	Cesar Cala	4,867	32.18	-8.31	$50,555
Alberta Party	Gar Gar	1,879	12.42	+11.20	$16,933
Liberal	Michelle Robinson	439	2.90	-0.70	$3,792
Green	William Carnegie	351	2.32	–	$3,515
Communist	Jonathan Trautman	69	0.46	+0.03	$500
Total		15,125	99.12	–	
Rejected, spoiled and declined		135	0.88		
Turnout		15,260	47.92		
Eligible voters		31,843			
United Conservative notional hold		Swing		+1.89	
Source(s) Source: Elections Alberta Note: Expenses is the sum of "Election Expenses", "Other Expenses" and "Transfers Issued". The Elections Act limits "Election Expenses" to $50,000.

2023 Alberta general election
Party	Candidate	Votes	%	±%
United Conservative	Peter Singh	7,123	50.23	+0.51
New Democratic	Rosman Valencia	6,425	45.31	+13.13
Green	Jayden Baldonado	403	2.84	+0.52
Solidarity Movement	Garry Dirk	166	1.17	–
Communist	Jonathan Trautman	64	0.45	-0.00
Total		14,181	99.02	–
Rejected and declined		141	0.98	
Turnout		14,322	44.41	
Eligible electors		32,250		
United Conservative hold		Swing		-6.31
Source(s) Source: Elections Alberta

== Senate nominee election results ==
=== 2004 ===
2004 Senate Nominee Election results: Calgary-East				Turnout 37.08%	
Affiliation	Candidate	Votes	% votes	% ballots	Rank
Progressive Conservative	Bert Brown	3,691	17.09%	50.54%	1
Progressive Conservative	Jim Silye	2,862	13.25%	39.19%	5
Progressive Conservative	Betty Unger	2,840	13.15%	38.89%	2
Progressive Conservative	Cliff Breitkreuz	2,333	10.80%	31.95%	3
Progressive Conservative	David Usherwood	2,074	9.61%	28.40%	6
Independent	Link Byfield	1,870	8.66%	25.61%	4
Alberta Alliance	Vance Gough	1,533	7.10%	20.99%	8
Alberta Alliance	Michael Roth	1,497	6.93%	20.50%	7
Independent	Tom Sindlinger	1,453	6.73%	19.90%	9
Alberta Alliance	Gary Horan	1,441	6.68%	19.73%	10
Total votes		21,594	100%		
Total ballots		7,303	2.96 votes per ballot		
Rejected, spoiled and declined		1,136			
22,759 eligible electors

Voters had the option of selecting four candidates on the ballot

== Student vote results ==
=== 2004 ===
Participating schools
Bob Edwards Junior High School
Chris Akkerman Elementary
Dr. Gordon Higgins Junior High School
Sir Wilfrid Laurier School

On November 19, 2004, a student vote was conducted at participating Alberta schools to parallel the 2004 Alberta general election results. The vote was designed to educate students and simulate the electoral process for persons who have not yet reached the legal majority. The vote was conducted in 80 of the 83 provincial electoral districts with students voting for actual election candidates. Schools with a large student body that reside in another electoral district had the option to vote for candidates outside of the electoral district then where they were physically located.

2004 Alberta student vote results
Affiliation	Candidate	Votes	%
Progressive Conservative	Moe Amery	252	35.49%
Liberal	Bill Harvey	161	22.68%
New Democratic	Paul Vargis	140	19.72%
Green	Rich Michelenko	99	13.94%
Communist	Bonnie Devine	30	4.23%
Alberta Alliance	Brad Berard	28	3.94%
Total		710	100%
Rejected, spoiled and declined		28	

=== 2012 ===
2012 Alberta student vote results
Affiliation	Candidate	Votes	%
Progressive Conservative	Moe Amery		%
Wildrose	Jesse Minhas		
Liberal	Ali Abdulbaki		%
New Democratic	Robyn Luff		%
Social Credit			%
Total			100%

== See also ==
- List of Alberta provincial electoral districts
- Canadian provincial electoral districts
- East Calgary Federal electoral district
- East Calgary North-West Territories territorial electoral district
