= Bob Hawkesworth =

Canadian politician (born 1951)

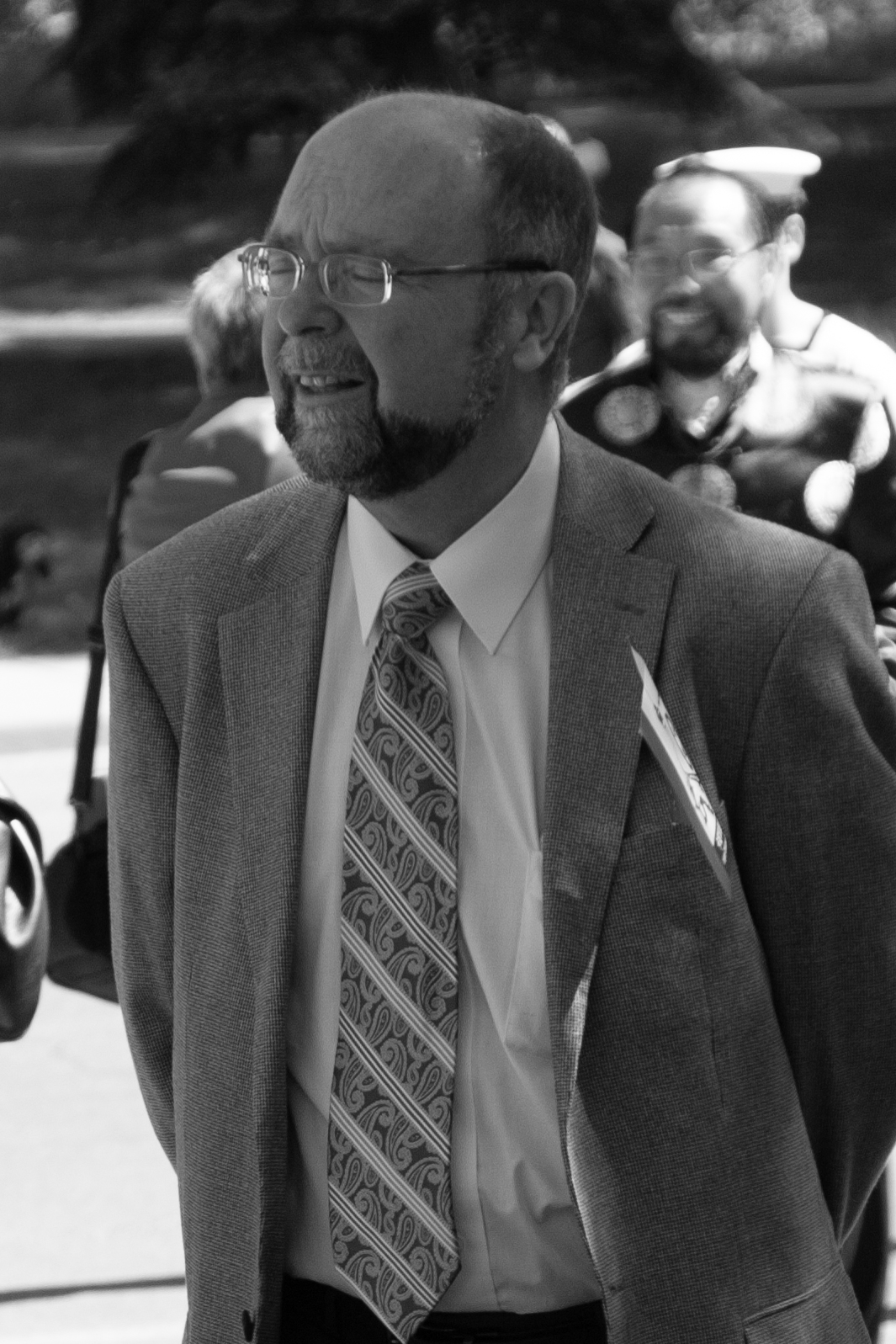
- Hawkesworth in Calgary's Chinatown (2010)

Member of the Legislative Assembly of Alberta for Calgary Mountain View
- In office 1986–1993
- Preceded by: Bohdan Zip
- Succeeded by: Mark Hlady

Personal details
- Born: Robert Andrew Hawkesworth; February 18, 1951 (age 75) Saskatoon, Saskatchewan
- Party: Alberta New Democratic Party

Robert Andrew "Bob" Hawkesworth (born February 18, 1951) is a Canadian politician and a former member of the Legislative Assembly of Alberta.

== Life and career ==
Hawkesworth was born in Saskatoon, Saskatchewan. He attended the University of Alberta and the University of Calgary before being elected in 1980 to Calgary City Council as alderman for Ward 3. He was elected to the Legislative Assembly of Alberta in the 1986 general election to represent the riding of Calgary Mountain View for the Alberta New Democratic Party. His Progressive Conservative (PC) opponent (whom he defeated by just 257 votes) in that election was Jim Prentice, a future federal government minister and Premier of Alberta. Hawkesworth was re-elected in the 1989 election before being defeated in the 1993 election by Mark Hlady. He returned to City Council and served as alderman for Ward 4 until October 18, 2010.

Hawkesworth received the 2000 Calgary United Way Spirits of Gold Award for co-chairing the Calgary Homeless Initiative and was named one of Alberta's 50 Most Influential People by Alberta Venture Magazine.

Hawkesworth ran for Mayor in the Calgary civic election held on October 18, 2010, which was won by Naheed Nenshi. He withdrew on October 13 to support Barb Higgins. Under Calgary's electoral rules a candidate can not run for multiple positions meaning Ward 4 did not have an incumbent on the ballot.

In July 2015, Hawkesworth won the NDP nomination for the by-election in the Calgary-Foothills district, due in September of that year. The seat had been vacated by Jim Prentice (whom Hawkesworth had defeated almost 30 years earlier) following the PCs defeat by the NDP at the 2015 general election. But in the by-election on September 3, 2015, he lost out to Wildrose candidate Prasad Panda.

== Electoral history ==
=== 2015 Calgary-Foothills by-election ===
Alberta provincial by-election, September 3, 2015: Calgary-Foothills Voiding of general election results due to Jim Prentice disclaiming his seat
Party	Candidate	Votes	%	±%
Wildrose	Prasad Panda	4,877	38.35	+20.24
New Democratic	Bob Hawkesworth	3,270	25.71	-6.65
Progressive Conservative	Blair Houston	2,746	21.59	-18.74
Liberal	Ali Bin Zahid	791	6.22	-0.94
Alberta Party	Mark Taylor	610	4.80	+4.80
Green	Janet Keeping	377	2.96	+0.92
Independent	Antoni Grochowski	46	0.36	–
Total valid votes		12,717		
Total rejected, unmarked and declined ballots				
Turnout			39.48	
Eligible voters		32,212		
Wildrose gain from Progressive Conservative		Swing		+19.49

=== 1993 Alberta general election ===
1993 Alberta general election results		Turnout 53.49%		Swing	
Affiliation	Candidate	Votes	%	Party	Personal
Progressive Conservative	Mark Hlady	5,768	46.21%	12.85%	
New Democratic	Bob Hawkesworth	3,255	26.08%	-25.67%	
Liberal	Jonathan Horlick	2,791	22.36%	7.47%	
Social Credit	George Clark	481	3.85%		
Confederation of Regions	Bruce Jackman	116	0.93%		
Natural Law	Alberta Scraba	71	0.57%	*	
Total		12,482			
Rejected, spoiled and declined		38			
Eligible electors / Turnout		23,408	%		
Progressive Conservative gain from New Democratic		Swing		20.76%	

=== 1989 Alberta general election ===
1989 Alberta general election results		Turnout 54.99%		Swing	
Affiliation	Candidate	Votes	%	Party	Personal
New Democratic	Bob Hawkesworth	6,469	51.75%	6.10%	
Progressive Conservative	Vicky Adamson	4,171	33.36%	-10.16%	
Liberal	Kevin Murphy	1,862	14.89%	5.48%	
Total		12,502			
Rejected, spoiled and declined		52			
Eligible electors / Turnout		22,831	%		
NDP hold				Swing 8.13%	

=== 1986 Alberta general election ===
1986 Alberta general election results		Turnout 51.56%		Swing	
Affiliation	Candidate	Votes	%	Party	Personal
New Democratic	Bob Hawkesworth	5,524	45.65%	18.58%	
Progressive Conservative	Jim Prentice	5,267	43.52%	-14.17%	
Liberal	Doug Rae	1,139	9.41%	6.04%	
Independent	Tom Erhart	172	1.42%		
Total		12,102			
Rejected, spoiled and declined		57			
Eligible electors / Turnout		23,542	%		
NDP gain from Progressive Conservative.				Swing 16.38%	
