= David Swann =

Canadian politician

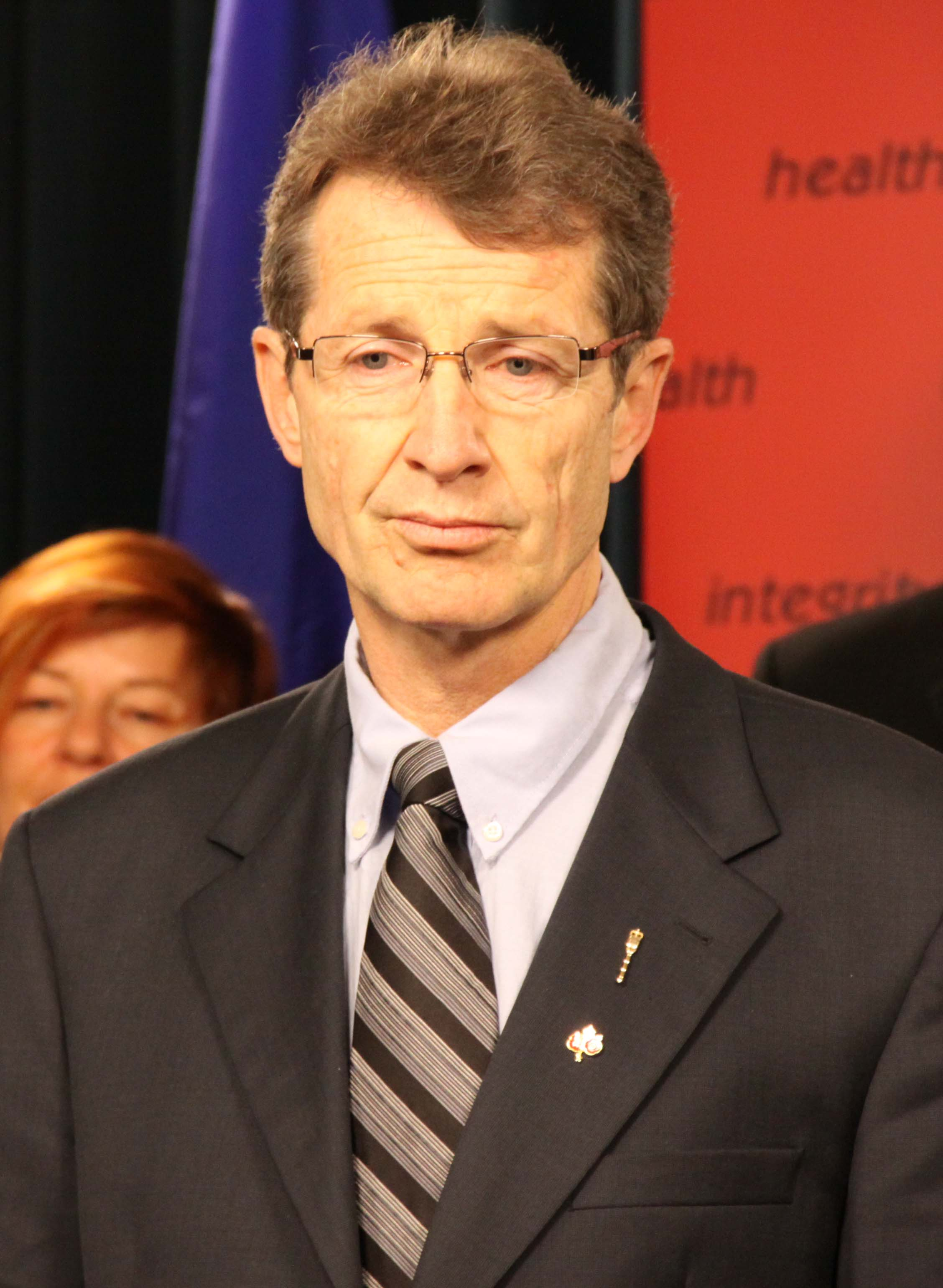
- Swann in 2010

Leader of the Official Opposition in Alberta
- In office December 15, 2008 – September 10, 2011
- Preceded by: Kevin Taft
- Succeeded by: Raj Sherman

Leader of the Alberta Liberal Party
- Interim
- In office February 1, 2015 – June 4, 2017
- Preceded by: Raj Sherman
- Succeeded by: David Khan
- In office December 12, 2008 – September 10, 2011
- Preceded by: Kevin Taft
- Succeeded by: Raj Sherman

Member of the Legislative Assembly of Alberta for Calgary-Mountain View
- In office November 22, 2004 – April 16, 2019
- Preceded by: Mark Hlady
- Succeeded by: Kathleen Ganley

Personal details
- Born: David Richard Swann; 19 June 1949 (age 77) Taber, Alberta, Canada
- Party: Liberal
- Spouse: Laureen
- Education: University of Alberta; University of Calgary
- Profession: Politician; medical doctor
- Website: www.davidswann.ca

David Richard Swann (born June 19, 1949) is a Canadian medical doctor and politician. He was the leader of the Alberta Liberal Party and Leader of the Opposition in the Alberta Legislature from December 2008 until resigning as party leader in September 2011. He returned as interim leader of the Alberta Liberal Party on February 1, 2015, following the resignation of Raj Sherman and led the party through the 2015 provincial election.

Swann is, to date, the last Liberal elected to the Alberta Legislature.

== Family and early life ==
Swann was born in Taber, Alberta, and was raised in a middle-class family on the edge of downtown Calgary. His father, Richard Swann, was head of oil and gas exploration for Canadian Fina for many years, before that company was sold to Petro Canada. His mother Margaret was an active volunteer while raising him and his four siblings.

His summers as a child were spent in the countryside and mountains of Alberta. As he grew up, he worked on farms, at gas plants and hospitals to finance his education.

Swann attended Western Canada High School before entering the University of Alberta in Edmonton in 1967. While at the U of A, he was a member of the Golden Bears Basketball team that went to the national basketball finals in 1969. He is still a sports fan and considers himself an outdoorsman; Swann is a regular runner, biker, hiker and canoeist.

After graduating in Family Medicine in 1975, Swann worked in mission hospitals in South Africa for three years, where he met his future wife, Laureen Ross, also a doctor. There he discovered the deep connection between medicine and politics firsthand. He was deeply affected by the human rights abuses of apartheid, particularly the killing of Steve Biko, who lived near the mission where he worked.

Swann and his wife returned to Canada in 1979, were married and settled in Pincher Creek for seven years. This is where their three children were born, and where he participated in a private medical practice with four other physicians.

In 1984, he began specialty training in Public Health (Prevention) and, after graduating in 1989, co-ordinated a primary health care project for the University of Calgary in the Philippines. After returning to Canada, he joined the Alberta Association of Medical Health Officers, becoming their president in 2000 while serving as Medical Officer of Health for Palliser Health and Headwaters Health regions.

In 2002, the Alberta Society of Health Officers passed a resolution calling for real government action on climate change and reductions to air pollution. Swann supported this resolution, the government fired him from his position with Palliser Health within days. This led to widespread condemnation of the Alberta Environment Minister, Lorne Taylor, who had influenced Health Chairman Len Mitzel to terminate him.

Under intense public pressure, the Palliser Board was forced to offer Swann his job back. He declined, instead making humanitarian trips to Iraq, then returning to Alberta to run in the 2004 provincial election.

== Political career ==
Swann entered electoral politics as a candidate for the Alberta Liberals. He was elected to the Alberta Legislature in the Alberta general election on 22 November 2004. Along with Harry B. Chase, and Dave Taylor, Swann was part of a re-emergence of provincial Liberals in Calgary which had been completely held by the Progressive Conservatives. During his first term Swann was environment critic and also served as deputy chair of the Standing Committee on Resources and Environment and as a member of the Private Bills Committee and the Standing Committee on Health. Swann was re-elected in the March 3, 2008 election.

Party leader Kevin Taft resigned following the election in which the party last almost half of its seats. Swann won the subsequent 2008 Alberta Liberal leadership election on 13 December 2008, defeating Dave Taylor and Mo Elsalhy. During his tenure as leader the party continued to suffer from resignations and internal divisions which contributed to it falling to third place in the polls behind the Wildrose Alliance. On 1 February 2011, he announced his resignation as leader with effect after the spring session of the Legislative Assembly. He resigned without having led the party through a general election; however, four years later, Swann was given the opportunity to lead the party through an election campaign when party leader Raj Sherman suddenly resigned weeks before the 2015 provincial election was called and Swann was appointed interim leader. In the course of the campaign, Swann's Liberals faced an unexpected surge by the Alberta New Democratic Party under its new leader, Rachel Notley, which threatened to cut into Liberal support, as well as a resurgent Wildrose Party which also resulted in pressure on Liberal supporters to strategically vote for the more moderate Progressive Conservatives in order to block the more right wing Wildrose Party from forming government.

The 2015 election resulted in the defeat of the Progressive Conservatives after 44 years in power and the election of the first NDP government in Alberta history. The Liberals under Swann received 4% of the popular vote, less than half their result in the 2012 election. Only Swann retained his seat becoming the sole Liberal MLA elected, down from 5 Liberal seats.

== Advocacy ==
Swann has advocated for many causes related to peace and development, human rights and social justice and has worked with organizations such as Physicians for Global Survival, Amnesty International, and Doctors Without Borders. Swann has been a vocal supporter of farm workers' rights and regularly campaigns for occupational health and safety laws for Alberta's agricultural sector. Swann is the current interim spokesperson for Extinction Rebellion Calgary.

== Electoral history ==
=== 2004 Alberta general election ===
2004 Alberta general election: Calgary-Mountain View
Party	Candidate	Votes	%	±%
Liberal	David Swann	7,162	53.31%	28.94%
Progressive Conservative	Mark Hlady	4,088	30.43%	-29.91%
Green	Mark MacGillivray	884	6.58%	–
New Democratic	John Donovan	712	5.30%	-9.99%
Alberta Alliance	Ryan Cassell	589	4.38%	–
Total		13,435	–	–
Rejected, spoiled and declined		67	13	17
Eligible electors / turnout		27,299	49.52%	3.31%
Liberal gain from Progressive Conservative		Swing		29.43%
Source(s) Source: Office of the Chief Electoral Officer (2005). The Report of the Chief Electoral Officer on the 2004 Provincial Enumeration and Monday, November 22, 2004 Provincial General Election of the Twenty-sixth Legislative Assembly. Edmonton: Alberta Legislative Assembly. ISSN 1483-1171. OCLC 1052543255.

=== 2008 Alberta general election ===
2008 Alberta general election: Calgary-Mountain View
Party	Candidate	Votes	%	±%
Liberal	David Swann	7,086	51.5%	-1.8%
Progressive Conservative	Leah Lawrence	4,252	30.9%	0.5%
Wildrose Alliance	Cory Morgan	892	6.5%	2.1%
Green	Juliet Burgess	865	6.3%	-0.3%
New Democratic	John Donovan	661	4.8%	-0.5%
Total		13,756	–	–
Rejected, spoiled and declined		45	33	8
Eligible electors / turnout		33,311	41.5%	-8.1%
Liberal hold		Swing		-1.1%
Source(s) Source: Office of the Chief Electoral Officer (2008). The Report on the March 3, 2008 Provincial General Election of the Twenty-Seventh Legislative Assembly. Edmonton: Alberta Legislative Assembly. pp. 238–241. ISSN 1483-1171.

=== 2012 Alberta general election ===
2012 Alberta general election: Calgary-Mountain View
Party	Candidate	Votes	%	±%
Liberal	David Swann	6,918	40.23%	-11.28%
Progressive Conservative	Cecilia Low	5,270	30.65%	-0.26%
Wildrose	Shane McAllister	3,915	22.77%	16.28%
New Democratic	Christopher McMillan	863	5.02%	0.21%
Alberta Party	Inshan S. Mohammed	230	1.34%	–
Total		17,196	–	–
Rejected, spoiled and declined		105	51	6
Eligible electors / turnout		29,988	57.71%	16.26%
Liberal hold		Swing		-5.51%
Source(s) Source: "21 - Calgary-Mountain View, 2012 Alberta general election". officialresults.elections.ab.ca. Elections Alberta.

=== 2015 Alberta general election ===
2015 Alberta general election: Calgary-Mountain View
Party	Candidate	Votes	%	±%
Liberal	David Swann	7,204	36.67%	-3.56%
New Democratic	Marc Andrew Chikinda	5,673	28.88%	23.86%
Progressive Conservative	Mark Hlady	4,699	23.92%	-6.73%
Wildrose	Terry Wong	2,070	10.54%	-12.23%
Total		19,646	–	–
Rejected, spoiled and declined		45	56	19
Eligible electors / turnout		36,236	54.39%	-3.32%
Liberal hold		Swing		-0.90%
Source(s) Source: "21 - Calgary-Mountain View, 2015 Alberta general election". officialresults.elections.ab.ca. Elections Alberta.
