= Calgary-Cross =

Provincial electoral district in Alberta, Canada

Coordinates: 51.08°N 113.98°W

Alberta electoral district
- Calgary-Cross within the City of Calgary, 2017 boundaries

Provincial electoral district
- Legislature: Legislative Assembly of Alberta
MLA
Mickey Amery
United Conservative
- District created: 1993
- First contested: 1993
- Last contested: 2023

Calgary-Cross is a current provincial electoral district in Calgary, Alberta, Canada. Created in 1993, the district is one of 87 districts mandated to return a single member (MLA) to the Legislative Assembly of Alberta using the first past the post method of voting.

The district was created in the 1993 boundary redistribution from Calgary-McCall and Calgary-Montrose, and present boundaries covers the neighbourhoods of Pineridge, Rundle, Marlborough, Marlborough Park and Monterey Park in northeast Calgary.

== History ==
The electoral district was created in the 1993 boundary re-distribution from the electoral districts of Calgary-McCall and Calgary-Montrose. The district is named after Alfred Ernest Cross (a member of Calgary's Big Four) who entered politics in 1898, and was elected as a Member of the Legislative Assembly (MLA) for East Calgary prior to the formation of Alberta.

The 2010 Alberta boundary re-distribution saw all land east of 68 Street NE distributed to the new Calgary-Greenway electoral district. The west boundary was moved to Deerfoot Trail claiming land that used to be in McCall, Calgary-East and Calgary-North Hill. When created in 2010, the Calgary-Acadia electoral district would have a population of 46,102, which was 12.77 above the provincial average of 40,880.

The 2017 electoral boundary re-distribution saw Calgary-Cross gain the remainder of the Marlborough community from Calgary-East while moving the Abbeydale community to Calgary-East. The boundaries as adjusted would give the electoral district a population of 50,634 in 2017, 8% above the provincial average of 46,803.

=== Boundary history ===
4 Calgary-Cross 2003 boundaries
Bordering districts
| North | East | West | South |
|---|---|---|---|
| Calgary-McCall | Airdrie-Chestermere | Calgary-East and Calgary-McCall | Calgary-Montrose |
| riding map goes here | | | |
Legal description from the Statutes of Alberta 2003, Electoral Divisions Act.
Starting at the intersection of 36 Street NE with McKnight Boulevard NE; then 1. east along McKnight Boulevard NE to the east Calgary city boundary (84 Street NE); 2. south along the city boundary to the easterly extension of 32 Avenue NE; 3. west along the extension and 32 Avenue NE to the northerly extension of the east boundary of Block 10, Plan 8411285 (Monterey Park Estates); 4. generally south, west and north along the block boundary and its northerly extension to 32 Avenue NE; 5. west along 32 Avenue NE to 68 Street NE; 6. south along 68 Street NE to 16 Avenue NE; 7. west along 16 Avenue NE to 52 Street NE; 8. north along 52 Street NE to 32 Avenue NE; 9. west along 32 Avenue NE to 36 Street NE; 10. north along 36 Street NE to the starting point.
Note:

6 Calgary-Cross 2010 boundaries
Bordering districts
| North | East | West | South |
|---|---|---|---|
| Calgary-Mackay-Nose Hill and Calgary-McCall | Calgary-Greenway | Calgary-Klein and Calgary-Mountain View | Calgary-East |
Note: Boundary descriptions were not used in the 2010 redistribution

=== Representation history ===
Members of the Legislative Assembly for Calgary-Cross
| Assembly | Years | Member | Party |
|---|---|---|---|
See Calgary-McCall 1971-1993 and Calgary-Montrose 1986-1993
| 23rd | 1993-1997 | Yvonne Fritz | Progressive Conservative |
| 24th | 1997-2001 | Yvonne Fritz | Progressive Conservative |
| 25th | 2001-2004 | Yvonne Fritz | Progressive Conservative |
| 26th | 2004-2008 | Yvonne Fritz | Progressive Conservative |
| 27th | 2008–2012 | Yvonne Fritz | Progressive Conservative |
| 28th | 2012–2015 | Yvonne Fritz | Progressive Conservative |
| 29th | 2015–2019 | Ricardo Miranda | New Democratic |
| 30th | 2019–2023 | Mickey Amery | United Conservative |
| 31st | 2023–present | Mickey Amery | United Conservative |

Calgary-Cross was created from the electoral districts of Calgary-McCall and Calgary-Montrose in the 1993 boundary redistribution. Currently, the constituency is represented by Mickey Amery. The first representative was Progressive Conservative member Yvonne Fritz. Prior to representing Montrose she served as an Alderman for the city of Calgary representing the Ward 5 electoral district.

The 1993 election saw Fritz win with a large majority of votes. She sought a second term in 1997 and while her popularity declined she still won very easily over Liberal Keith Jones.

Jones and Fritz would face each other again in the 2001 general election. She would go on to win the district with the largest majority of her career while Jones saw his popular vote collapse. Fritz would win a fourth term in the 2004 general election, seeing almost half her vote disappear.

Fritz became a cabinet minister for the first time in 2004. She won re-election again in 2008.

== Legislative election results ==
=== 1993 ===
1993 Alberta general election
| Party | Candidate | Votes | % | ±% |
|---|---|---|---|---|
| Progressive Conservative | Yvonne Fritz | 6,449 | 59.73% | – |
| Liberal | Keith Hart | 3,576 | 33.12% | – |
| New Democratic | Vinay Dey | 686 | 6.35% | – |
| Natural Law | Neeraj Varma | 86 | 0.80% | – |
| Total | | 10,797 | – | – |
| Rejected, spoiled and declined | | 31 | – | – |
| Eligible electors / turnout | | 21,346 | 50.73% | – |
| Progressive Conservative pickup new district. | | | | |
Source(s) Source: "Calgary-Cross Official Results 1993 Alberta general election". Alberta Heritage Community Foundation.

=== 1997 ===
1997 Alberta general election
| Party | Candidate | Votes | % | ±% |
|---|---|---|---|---|
| Progressive Conservative | Yvonne Fritz | 5,964 | 67.11% | 7.38% |
| Liberal | Keith Jones | 2,456 | 27.64% | -5.48% |
| Social Credit | Maurizio Terrigno | 467 | 5.25% | – |
| Total | | 8,887 | – | – |
| Rejected, spoiled and declined | | 30 | – | – |
| Eligible electors / turnout | | 21,811 | 40.88% | -9.84% |
| Progressive Conservative hold | | Swing | | 6.43% |
Source(s) Source: "Calgary-Cross Official Results 1997 Alberta general election". Alberta Heritage Community Foundation.

=== 2001 ===
2001 Alberta general election
| Party | Candidate | Votes | % | ±% |
|---|---|---|---|---|
| Progressive Conservative | Yvonne Fritz | 6,816 | 74.96% | 7.85% |
| Liberal | Keith Jones | 1,836 | 20.19% | -7.44% |
| New Democratic | Ramiro Mora | 441 | 4.85% | – |
| Total | | 9,093 | – | – |
| Rejected, spoiled and declined | | 85 | – | – |
| Eligible electors / turnout | | 21,920 | 41.87% | 0.99% |
| Progressive Conservative hold | | Swing | | 7.65% |
Source(s) Source: "Calgary-Cross Official Results 2001 Alberta general election". Alberta Heritage Community Foundation.

=== 2004 ===
2004 Alberta general election
| Party | Candidate | Votes | % | ±% |
|---|---|---|---|---|
| Progressive Conservative | Yvonne Fritz | 3,770 | 57.71% | -17.25% |
| Liberal | Raleigh Dehaney | 1,453 | 22.24% | 2.05% |
| Alberta Alliance | Gordon Huth | 646 | 9.89% | – |
| New Democratic | Jeanie Keebler | 393 | 6.02% | 1.17% |
| Green | Ryan Richardson | 271 | 4.15% | – |
| Total | | 6,533 | – | – |
| Rejected, spoiled and declined | | 49 | – | – |
| Eligible electors / turnout | | 21,993 | 29.93% | -11.94% |
| Progressive Conservative hold | | Swing | | -9.65% |
Source(s) Source: "Calgary-Cross Statement of Official Results 2004 Alberta general election" (PDF). Elections Alberta.

=== 2008 ===
2008 Alberta general election
| Party | Candidate | Votes | % | ±% |
|---|---|---|---|---|
| Progressive Conservative | Yvonne Fritz | 4,004 | 56.82% | -0.89% |
| Liberal | Ron I. Reinhold | 1,567 | 22.24% | 0.00% |
| Wildrose Alliance | Gordon Huth | 605 | 8.59% | -1.30% |
| New Democratic | Shelina N. Hassanali | 476 | 6.75% | 0.74% |
| Green | Susan Stratton | 395 | 5.61% | 1.46% |
| Total | | 7,047 | – | – |
| Rejected, spoiled and declined | | 34 | – | – |
| Eligible electors / turnout | | 25,609 | 27.65% | -2.28% |
| Progressive Conservative hold | | Swing | | -0.44% |
Source(s) Source: "04 - Calgary-Cross, 2008 Alberta general election". officialresults.elections.ab.ca. Elections Alberta.

=== 2012 ===
2012 Alberta general election
| Party | Candidate | Votes | % | ±% |
|---|---|---|---|---|
| Progressive Conservative | Yvonne Fritz | 5,357 | 44.65% | -12.17% |
| Wildrose | Happy Mann | 4,557 | 37.98% | 29.40% |
| Liberal | Narita Sherman | 1,220 | 10.17% | -12.07% |
| New Democratic | Reinaldo Contreras | 604 | 5.03% | -1.72% |
| Evergreen | Susan Stratton | 260 | 2.17% | -3.42% |
| Total | | 11,998 | – | – |
| Rejected, spoiled and declined | | 116 | – | – |
| Eligible electors / turnout | | 27,680 | 43.76% | 16.11% |
| Progressive Conservative hold | | Swing | | -13.96% |
Source(s) Source: "06 - Calgary-Cross, 2012 Alberta general election". officialresults.elections.ab.ca. Elections Alberta.

=== 2015 ===
2015 Alberta general election
| Party | Candidate | Votes | % | ±% |
|---|---|---|---|---|
| New Democratic | Ricardo Miranda | 4,602 | 36.13% | 31.10% |
| Progressive Conservative | Rick Hanson | 4,501 | 35.34% | -9.31% |
| Wildrose | Moiz Mahmood | 2,060 | 16.17% | -21.81% |
| Liberal | Manjot Singh Gill | 1,194 | 9.38% | -0.79% |
| Green | Peter Meic | 236 | 1.85% | 0.32% |
| Independent | Katherine Le Rougetel † | 143 | 1.12% | – |
| Total | | 12,736 | – | – |
| Rejected, spoiled and declined | | 98 | – | – |
| Eligible electors / turnout | | 31,535 | 40.70% | -3.07% |
| New Democratic gain from Progressive Conservative | | Swing | | -2.94% |
Source(s) Source: "06 - Calgary-Cross, 2015 Alberta general election". officialresults.elections.ab.ca. Elections Alberta. †Le Rougetel was a candidate of the unregistered Communist League. See Ryan Rumbolt, "Communist League candidate Katherine LeRougetel enters mayoral race", Calgary Herald, 5 March 2017, accessed 8 March 2017.

2015 Alberta general election redistributed results
| Party | Votes | % |
|---|---|---|
| Progressive Conservative | 5,256 | 36.78 |
| New Democratic | 5,103 | 35.71 |
| Wildrose | 2,902 | 20.31 |
| Liberal | 783 | 5.48 |
| Green | 130 | 0.91 |
| Others | 116 | 0.81 |
Source(s) Source: Ridingbuilder

=== 2019 ===
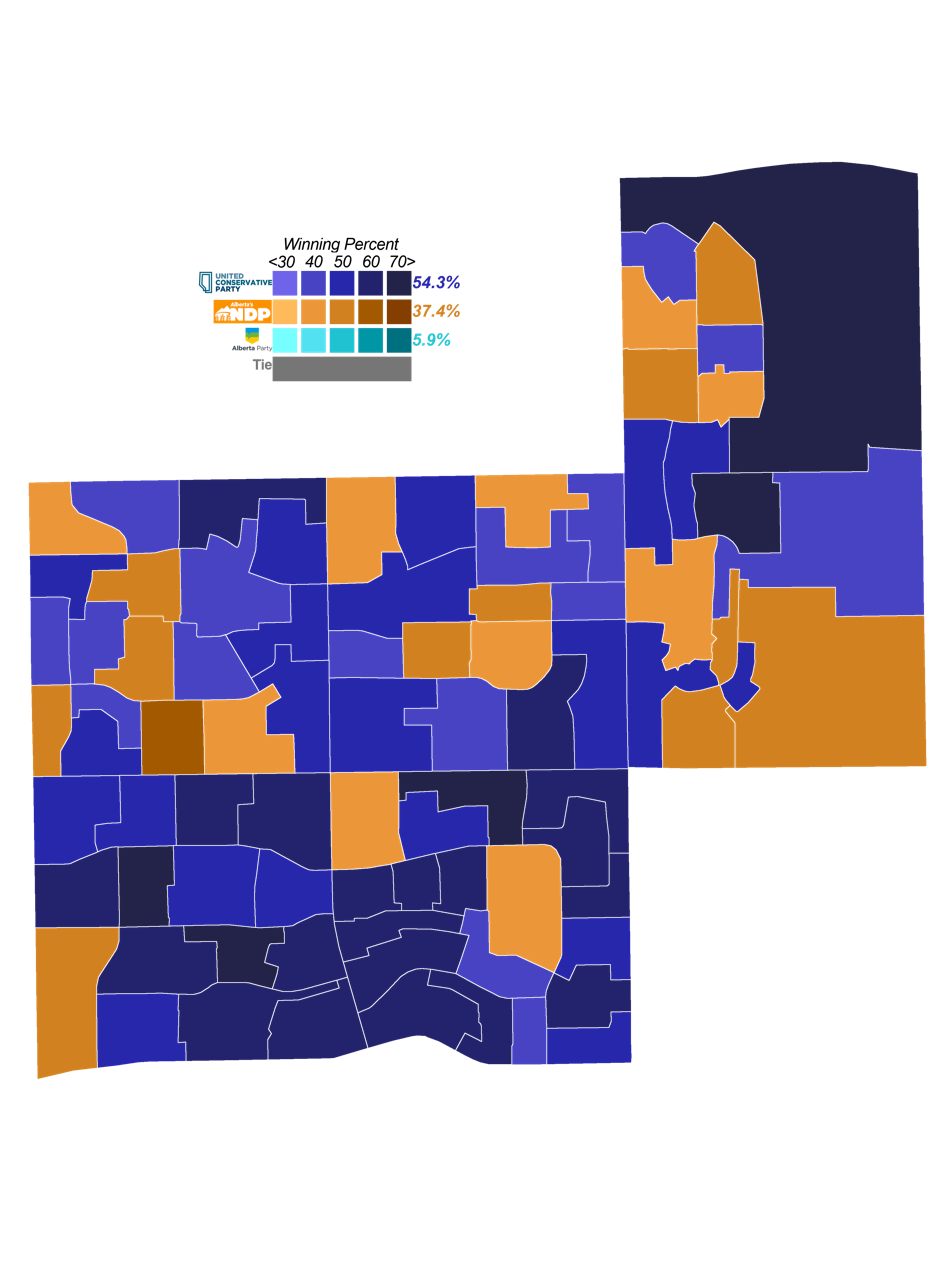
Results by Polling Division

2019 Alberta general election
| Party | Candidate | Votes | % | ±% | Expenditures |
|---|---|---|---|---|---|
| United Conservative | Mickey Amery | 8,907 | 54.26 | +2.75† | $39,209 |
| New Democratic | Ricardo Miranda | 6,135 | 37.38 | +1.25 | $54,925 |
| Alberta Party | Braham Luddu | 962 | 5.86 | – | $6,936 |
| Liberal | Naser Kukhun | 410 | 2.50 | -6.88 | $4,299 |
| Total | | 16,414 | 99.27 | – | |
| Rejected, spoiled and declined | | 121 | 0.73 | – | |
| Turnout | | 16,535 | 53.61 | | |
| Eligible voters | | 30,844 | | | |
| United Conservative notional hold | | Swing | | -2.25 | |
Source(s) Source: Elections Alberta Note: Expenses is the sum of "Election Expenses", "Other Expenses" and "Transfers Issued". The Elections Act limits "Election Expenses" to $50,000. †Comparison for UCP is to the combined Wildrose & PC redistributed vote in 2015

=== 2023 ===
2023 Alberta general election
| Party | Candidate | Votes | % | ±% |
|---|---|---|---|---|
| United Conservative | Mickey Amery | 7,533 | 50.19 | -4.07 |
| New Democratic | Gurinder Singh Gill | 7,019 | 46.77 | +9.39 |
| Green | Aman Sandhu | 254 | 1.69 | – |
| Solidarity Movement | Kathryn Lapp | 202 | 1.35 | – |
| Total | | 15,008 | 99.14 | – |
| Rejected and declined | | 130 | 0.86 | |
| Turnout | | 15,138 | 49.81 | |
| Eligible voters | | 30,393 | | |
| United Conservative hold | | Swing | | -6.73 |
Source(s) Source: Elections Alberta

== Senate nominee election results ==
=== 2004 ===
| 2004 Senate nominee election results: Calgary-Cross | | | | Turnout 29.62% | |
| Affiliation | Candidate | Votes | % votes | % ballots | Rank |
| Progressive Conservative | Bert Brown | 3,088 | 16.47% | 52.86% | 1 |
| Progressive Conservative | Betty Unger | 2,530 | 13.50% | 43.30% | 2 |
| Progressive Conservative | Jim Silye | 2,379 | 12.69% | 40.72% | 5 |
| Progressive Conservative | David Usherwood | 1,834 | 9.78% | 31.39% | 6 |
| Progressive Conservative | Cliff Breitkreuz | 1,826 | 9.74% | 31.26% | 3 |
| Independent | Link Byfield | 1,649 | 8.80% | 28.23% | 4 |
| Alberta Alliance | Vance Gough | 1,427 | 7.61% | 24.43% | 8 |
| Alberta Alliance | Michael Roth | 1,405 | 7.49% | 24.05% | 7 |
| Alberta Alliance | Gary Horan | 1,334 | 7.12% | 22.84% | 10 |
| Independent | Tom Sindlinger | 1,276 | 6.80% | 21.84% | 9 |
| Total votes | | 18,748 | 100% | | |
| Total ballots | | 5,842 | 3.21 votes per ballot | | |
| Rejected, spoiled and declined | | 673 | | | |
21,993 eligible electors

Voters had the option of selecting four candidates on the ballot

== Student vote results ==
=== 2004 ===
Participating schools
Lester B. Pearson High School
Pineridge Community School

On November 19, 2004, a student vote was conducted at participating Alberta schools to parallel the 2004 Alberta general election results. The vote was designed to educate students and simulate the electoral process for persons who have not yet reached the legal majority. The vote was conducted in 80 of the 83 provincial electoral districts with students voting for actual election candidates. Schools with a large student body that reside in another electoral district had the option to vote for candidates outside of the electoral district then where they were physically located.

2004 Alberta student vote results
| Affiliation | Candidate | Votes | % |
| Liberal | Raleigh Dehaney | 331 | 33.95% |
| Progressive Conservative | Yvonne Fritz | 272 | 27.90% |
| New Democratic | Jeanie Keebler | 238 | 24.41% |
| Green | Ryan Richardson | 81 | 8.31% |
| Alberta Alliance | Gordon Huth | 53 | 5.43% |
| Total | | 975 | 100% |
| Rejected, spoiled and declined | | 59 | |

== See also ==
- List of Alberta provincial electoral districts
- Canadian provincial electoral districts
