= Communist Party – Alberta =

Provincial political party in Canada

- Active provincial party
- Leader: Naomi Rankin
- Founded: 1930
- Headquarters: 2120 – 35 Street NW Edmonton, Alberta; T6L 3G2
- Ideology: Communism; Marxism–Leninism
- Political position: Far-left
- National affiliation: Communist Party of Canada
- Colours: Red

Website
- www.communistparty-alberta.ca

The Communist Party – Alberta (French: Parti communiste de l'Alberta) is the provincial section of the Communist Party of Canada in Alberta.

== History ==
Alberta had recognized Communist Party speakers and activists starting at the time of the founding of the Communist Party of Canada in 1922. The first years were troubled by uncertainty of its relationship to the radical One Big Union movement, that had originated in Alberta in 1919.

The post-World War I depression caused many Albertans to seek radical change of the economic system and the Communist Party was a potent force, active in organizing amongst, and lobbying governments on behalf of, the poor unemployed in the cities, struggling farmers and poorly paid urban workers. Its radical views found a good hearing among the immigrant communities who had fled unfair economic conditions in their homelands—Ukrainian, Finnish, Italians and Jews were prominent in the early movement, while British Communist immigrants led the movement due to their facility in the English language and their secure citizenship. Recent immigrants from other lands, even if naturalized, could be deported back to their land of origin due to political activism, and many were.

Communist Party member Henry Bartholomew, a well-known Communist speaker and lecturer in the city, ran in a 1924 Edmonton by-election under the banner of the Canadian Labour Party, which at the time took in both non-Communists and Communist Party members. He came in a strong third with 29 percent of the vote, and under the transferable balloting system in effect at the time (Instant-runoff voting), he took more votes in vote transfers, so that he was almost in second place, but, held out of the first two spots, he was "eliminated" and his ballots were re-distributed.

The Communist Party first ran its own candidate in the Edmonton by-election of January 9, 1931. It contested two more by-elections after that, the last of which was a by-election held on October 7, 1937, in the Edmonton electoral district in which Jan Lakeman, leader of the Alberta Communists, received the third most tally of votes. The party has not contested another by-election since but has placed candidates in many general provincial elections, beginning in 1935.

The federal government, worried about its latent strength, banned the Communist Party of Canada (and its Alberta wing) in the early 1930s and again at the start of World War II.

Communist Party candidates did not take any seats even when Alberta used Single Transferable Vote system, between 1924 and 1959. Its candidates were among the first to be eliminated, but their votes though had the chance to be transferred to assist CCF or other left candidates.

The party has been a very minor force due to Alberta's conservative politics that overtook the province starting in the 1940s. It achieved its best results in the 1940s with a couple of distant second-place finishes. In those elections, it called itself the "Labor-Progressive Party" because of the federal government's ban. (see also United Progressive which the party used in the 1940 election in Vegreville)

The party started using the Communist name again in 1963.

The Communist Party was less successful than other left wing parties in the province, such as the Labour Party and the Cooperative Commonwealth Federation. In the 1975 provincial election, the Communist Party split the far left wing vote with the Constitutional Socialist Party, and in other elections the Communist Party of Canada (Marxist-Leninist) also ran candidates.

The Communist Party did not run in the 1967 and 1971 elections. The party has run at least one candidate in every general election since then. In recent years, the Communist Party has not attracted more than a couple candidates with vote totals that rarely top 100 in each electoral district contested.

Pat Lenihan was elected to the Calgary City Council in 1939, in part due to the use of Proportional Representation in city elections. He is the only Communist Party member elected to Calgary council. (He is the subject of the book Patrick Lenihan From Irish Rebel to Founder of Canadian Public Sector Unionism, edited by Gilbert Levine (Athabasca University Press).)

== Party leaders ==
- Jan Lakeman, 1930–1937?
- Lawrence Anderson, 1937–1943?
- James A. MacPherson, 1943–1945
- Bernhard Rudolf Swankey, 1945–1957
- William Arnold Tuomi, 1978
- David Wallis, 19??–1986
- Norman Brudy, 1986–1992
- Naomi Rankin, since 1992

== Provincial election results by year ==
=== General elections ===
Election	Affiliation	# of candidates	Votes	Pop. %	Best candidate	Votes	District
1935	Communist	9	5,771	1.91%	Jan Lakeman	1,096	Edmonton
1940	Communist	1	1,067	0.35%	James A. MacPherson	1,067	Edmonton
1944	Labor-Progressive	30	12,003	4.26%	William Teresio	999	Vermilion
1948	Labor-Progressive	2	1,372	0.47%	Bernard Swankey	856	Pincher Creek-Crowsnest
1952	Labor-Progressive	2	1,132	0.38%	Bernard Swankey	824	Edmonton
1955	Labor-Progressive	9	3,420	0.90%	William Harasym	947	Edmonton
1959	Labor-Progressive	4	884	0.21%	William Tuomi	251	Edmonton Norwood
1963	Communist	4	527	0.13%	Dan Gamache	215	St. Paul
1975	Communist	14	768	0.13%	Neil Stenberg	116	Redwater-Andrew
1979	Communist	7	357	0.05%	William Tuomi	80	Edmonton-Highlands
1982	Communist	8	389	0.04%	Naomi Rankin	66	Edmonton-Highlands
1986	Communist	6	199	0.03%	Naomi Rankin	51	Edmonton-Highlands
1989	Communist	2	82	0.01%	Naomi Rankin	55	Edmonton-Gold Bar
1993	Communist	1	47	0.01%	Naomi Rankin	47	Edmonton-Strathcona
1997	Communist	1	61	0.01%	Naomi Rankin	61	Edmonton-Riverview
2001	Communist	2	117	0.01%	Naomi Rankin	76	Edmonton Centre
2004	Communist	2	98	0.01%	Bonnie-Jean Collins	56	Calgary East
2008	Communist	2	96	0.01%	Bonnie-Jean Collins	55	Calgary East
2012	Communist	2	210	0.02%	Bonnie Devine	166	Calgary East
2015	Communist	2	181	0.01%	Bonnie Devine	138	Calgary East
2019	Communist	4	313	0.02%	Alex S. Boykowich	103	Edmonton-Highlands-Norwood
2023	Communist	3	379	0.02%	Corinne Benson	213	Edmonton-Meadows

=== By-elections ===
Date	District	Candidate	Votes	%	Placement
January 9, 1931	Edmonton	Jan Lakeman	813	4.68%	4th out of 4
November 16, 1931	Red Deer	F.G. Bray	261	6.68%	4th out of 4
October 7, 1937	Edmonton	Jan Lakeman	1,779	5.72%	3rd out of 5
