= Chestermere-Strathmore =

Provincial electoral district in Alberta, Canada

Alberta electoral district
- Chestermere-Strathmore within the Calgary Metropolitan Region (2017 boundaries).

Provincial electoral district
- Legislature: Legislative Assembly of Alberta
MLA
Chantelle de Jonge
United Conservative
- District created: 2017
- First contested: 2019
- Last contested: 2023

Demographics
- Population (2016): 48,203
- Area (km²): 1,582
- Pop. density (per km²): 30.5
- Census division(s): 5, 6
- Census subdivision(s): Chestermere, Rocky View, Strathmore, Wheatland

Chestermere-Strathmore is a provincial electoral district in Alberta, Canada. The district will be one of 87 districts mandated to return a single member (MLA) to the Legislative Assembly of Alberta using the first past the post method of voting. It was contested for the first time in the 2019 Alberta election, and won by Leela Aheer of the United Conservative Party.

== Geography ==
The district is located east of Calgary, containing the City of Chestermere, the Town of Strathmore and sections of Rocky View County and Wheatland County. Its borders are formed by the City of Calgary to the west, the Bow River to the south, Highway 564 to the north, and RR242, RR 241 west of Namaka, and Siksika 146 to the east.

== History ==
Members for Chestermere-Strathmore
| Assembly | Years | Member | Party |
|---|---|---|---|
See Chestermere-Rocky View 2012-2019 and Strathmore-Brooks 1997-2019
| 30th | 2019–2023 | Leela Aheer | United Conservative |
| 31st | 2023– | Chantelle de Jonge | United Conservative |

The district was created in 2017 when the Electoral Boundaries Commission recommended abolishing Strathmore-Brooks and Chestermere-Rocky View, completely reorganizing the ridings surrounding Calgary to reflect the rapid growth in the area.

Leela Aheer stood down at the 2023 Alberta general election and was succeeded by Chantelle de Jonge.

== Electoral results ==
=== 2023 ===
2023 Alberta general election
| Party | Candidate | Votes | % | ±% |
|---|---|---|---|---|
| United Conservative | Chantelle de Jonge | 15,362 | 69.68 | +1.20 |
| New Democratic | Raj Jessel | 6,119 | 27.75 | +12.15 |
| Alberta Independence | Kerry Lambert | 264 | 1.20 | +0.60 |
| Independent | Terry Nicholls | 258 | 1.17 | +0.68 |
| Solidarity Movement | Jed Laboucane | 45 | 0.20 | – |
| Total | | 22,048 | 99.29 | – |
| Rejected and declined | | 158 | 0.71 | |
| Turnout | | 22,206 | 58.18 | |
| Eligible voters | | 38,167 | | |
| United Conservative hold | | Swing | | -5.47 |
Source(s) Source: Elections Alberta

=== 2019 ===
2019 Alberta general election
| Party | Candidate | Votes | % | ±% |
|---|---|---|---|---|
| United Conservative | Leela Sharon Aheer | 15,612 | 68.48 | -3.57 |
| New Democratic | Melissa Langmaid | 3,558 | 15.61 | -2.69 |
| Freedom Conservative | Derek Fildebrandt | 1,683 | 7.38 | – |
| Alberta Party | Jason Avramenko | 1,460 | 6.40 | +5.49 |
| Liberal | Sharon L. Howe | 238 | 1.04 | +0.46 |
| Alberta Independence | Roger Dean Walker | 136 | 0.60 | – |
| Independent | Terry Nicholls | 112 | 0.49 | – |
| Total | | 22,799 | 99.25 | – |
| Rejected, spoiled and declined | | 173 | 0.75 | |
| Turnout | | 22,972 | 67.12 | |
| Eligible voters | | 34,226 | | |
| United Conservative notional hold | | Swing | | -0.44 |
Source(s) Source: "56 - Chestermere-Strathmore, 2019 Alberta general election". officialresults.elections.ab.ca. Elections Alberta. Alberta. Chief Electoral Officer (2019). 2019 General Election. A Report of the Chief Electoral Officer. Volume II (PDF) (Report). Vol. 2. Edmonton, Alta.: Elections Alberta. pp. 243–248. ISBN 978-1-988620-12-1.

=== 2015 ===
Redistributed results, 2015 Alberta election
| Wildrose | 7,402 | 44.67 |
| Progressive Conservative | 4,537 | 27.38 |
| New Democratic | 3,031 | 18.29 |
| Green | 301 | 1.82 |
| Alberta Party | 152 | 0.92 |
| Liberal | 96 | 0.58 |
| Others | 1,052 | 6.35 |
Source(s) Source: Ridingbuilder

== Nomination contests ==
UCP Chestermere-Strathmore nomination contest: December 17, 2022

| Candidate | Votes | % |
|---|---|---|
| Chantelle de Jonge | 1,118 | 62.8 |
| Dharminder Premi | 663 | 37.2 |
| Total | 1,781 | 100.0 |

== See also ==
- List of Alberta provincial electoral districts
- Canadian provincial electoral districts
