= Strathmore-Brooks =

Defunct provincial electoral district in Alberta, Canada

Alberta electoral district
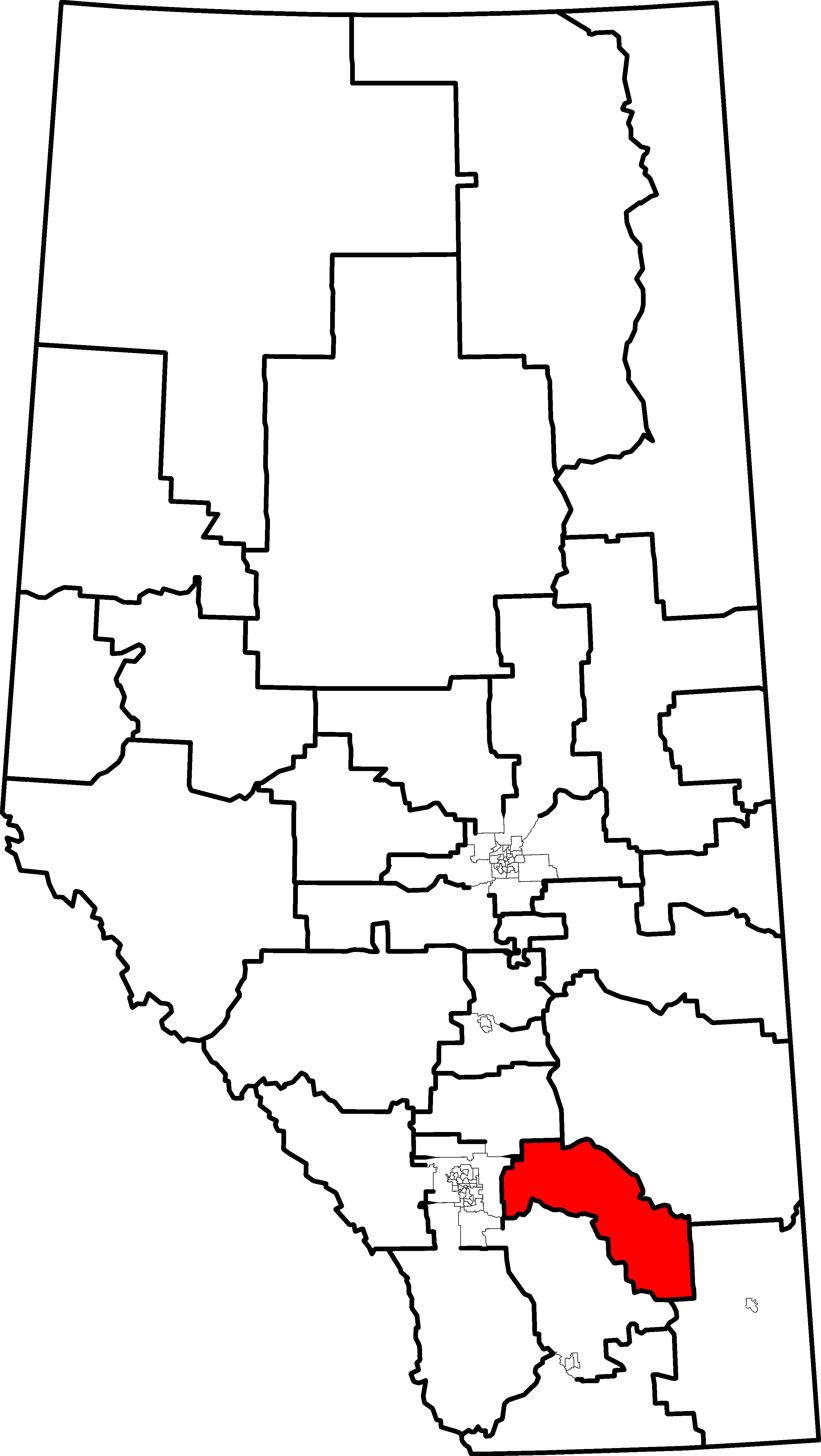
- 2004 boundaries

Defunct provincial electoral district
- Legislature: Legislative Assembly of Alberta
- District created: 1996
- District abolished: 2019
- First contested: 1997
- Last contested: 2015

Strathmore-Brooks was a provincial electoral district in Alberta, Canada, mandated to return a single member to the Legislative Assembly of Alberta using the first-past-the-post method of voting from 1997 to 2019.

== History ==
The electoral district was created in the 1996 boundary re-distribution from most of the old electoral district of Bow Valley.

The 2004 electoral boundary re-distribution saw the boundaries revised to include a portion of land from the dissolved Drumheller-Chinook electoral district, and losing a small portion of the south-east portion of the district to Little Bow.

The 2010 electoral boundary re-distribution saw the electoral district completely untouched using exactly the same boundaries as set in 2003.

The Strathmore-Brooks electoral district was dissolved in the 2017 electoral boundary re-distribution, and portions of the district would form the Brooks-Medicine Hat, Olds-Didsbury-Three Hills, and Chestermere-Strathmore electoral districts.

=== Boundary history ===
79 Strathmore-Brooks 2003 boundaries
Bordering districts
North	East	West	South
Olds-Didsbury-Three Hills	Drumheller-Stettler and Cypress-Medicine Hat	Airdrie-Chestermere	Little Bow and Cypress-Medicine Hat
riding map goes here			
Legal description from the Statutes of Alberta 2003, Electoral Divisions Act
Starting at the intersection of the east boundary of Rge. 25 W4 and the north boundary of Sec. 7 in Twp. 28 W4; then 1. east along the north boundary of Secs. 7, 8, 9, 10, 11 and 12 in Rges. 24, 23 and 22 and Secs. 7, 8 and 9 in Twp. 28, Rge. 21 W4 to the east boundary of Sec. 9 in the Twp.; 2. south along the east boundary of Secs. 9 and 4 in the Twp. and the east boundary of Secs. 33, 28 and 21 in Twp. 27, Rge. 21 W4 to the intersection with the Canadian National Railway (CNR) right-of-way; 3. in a northeasterly direction along the CNR right-of-way to the east boundary of the west half of Sec. 1, Twp. 28, Rge. 20 W4; 4. north along the east boundary of the west half to the north boundary of Sec. 1; 5. east along the north boundary of Sec. 1 to the south Drumheller town boundary; 6. easterly and southerly along the town boundary to its most southeasterly point of the town boundary and the right bank of the Red Deer River; 7. downstream along the right bank of the Red Deer River to the east boundary of Rge. 11 W4; 8. south along the east boundary to the north boundary of Twp. 13; 9. west along the north boundary to the right bank of the Bow River; 10. upstream along the right bank of the Bow River to its intersection with the south boundary of the Siksika Indian Reserve No. 146; 11. generally north, northwest and southwest along the Siksika Indian Reserve No. 146 boundary to the right bank of the Bow River; 12. upstream along the right bank to the east boundary of Rge. 27 W4; 13. north along the east boundary to the north boundary of Sec. 7 in Twp. 25, Rge. 26 W4; 14. east along the north boundary to the east boundary of Sec. 18 in the Twp.; 15. north along the east boundary of Secs. 18 and 19 to the north boundary of Sec. 20 in the Twp.; 16. east along the north boundary to the east boundary of Sec. 29 in the Twp.; 17. north along the east boundary of Secs. 29 and 32 in the Twp. to the north boundary of Twp. 25; 18. east along the north boundary to the east boundary of Rge. 26 W4; 19. north along the east boundary to the north boundary of Sec. 19 in Twp. 26, Rge. 25 W4; 20. east along the north boundary of Secs. 19, 20, 21, 22 and 23 in the Twp. to the east boundary of Sec. 26; 21. north along the east boundary of Secs. 26 and 35 to the north boundary of Twp. 26; 22. west along the north boundary to the east boundary of Rge. 25; 23. north along the east boundary of Rge. 25 to the starting point.
Note:

83 Strathmore-Brooks 2010 boundaries
Bordering districts
North	East	West	South
Drumheller-Stettler and Olds-Didsbury-Three Hills	Cypress-Medicine Hat	Chestermere-Rocky View	Little Bow
Legal description from the Statutes of Alberta 2010, Electoral Divisions Act
See legal description from the Statutes of Alberta 2003, Electoral Divisions Act.
Note: The district remained unchanged in 2010.

=== Representation history ===
Members of the Legislative Assembly for Strathmore-Brooks
Assembly	Years	Member	Party
See Bow Valley 1971–1993
24th	1997–2001	Lyle Oberg	Progressive Conservative
25th	2001–2004	Lyle Oberg	Progressive Conservative
26th	2004–2006	Lyle Oberg	Progressive Conservative
26th	2006	Lyle Oberg	Independent
26th	2006–2008	Lyle Oberg	Progressive Conservative
27th	2008–2012	Arno Doerksen	Progressive Conservative
28th	2012–2014	Jason Hale	Wildrose
28th	2014–2015	Jason Hale	Progressive Conservative
29th	2015–2016	Derek Fildebrandt	Wildrose
29th	2016	Derek Fildebrandt	Independent
29th	2016–2017	Derek Fildebrandt	Wildrose
29th	2017	Derek Fildebrandt	United Conservative
29th	2017–2018	Derek Fildebrandt	Independent
29th	2018–2019	Derek Fildebrandt	Freedom Conservative
See Brooks-Medicine Hat, Olds-Didsbury-Three Hills and Chestermere-Strathmore 2019–

The electoral district was created in 1997. The first election that year saw Progressive Conservative incumbent Lyle Oberg win the new district with over 70% of the popular vote. Oberg had served as MLA for Bow Valley from 1993 to 1997 before it was abolished.

After the election Oberg was appointed to serve in the cabinet of Premier Ralph Klein. He ran for his third term in the 2001 general election and won. He took a slightly higher percentage of the popular vote.

Oberg ran for his third term in the district and fourth as an MLA. His popularity started to slide. He was re-elected with a reduced majority losing over 10% of his popular vote.

Controversy would follow in 2006 after Oberg resigned his cabinet post to seek the leadership of the Progressive Conservative party in the wake of Ralph Klein's resignation. He was removed from Progressive Conservative caucus days later on March 22, 2006, and forced to sit as an independent after suggesting that he knew where the skeletons were in the closet of the Progressive Conservative government.

Oberg ran for leadership of the party as an independent and lost. He was readmitted to the caucus on July 25, 2006, by Premier Ed Stelmach and returned to cabinet. Oberg did not stand for re-election in 2008. The election that year returned Progressive Conservative candidate Arno Doerksen with a landslide majority.

In the 2012 general election, Wildrose candidate Jason Hale defeated Doerksen by a comfortable margin as the party went on to dominate rural southern Alberta.

In December 2014, Hale crossed the floor with eight other Wildrose MLAs to the Progressive Conservative Party. In January 2015, Derek Fildebrandt announced that he would seek the Wildrose nomination to challenge Hale. Hale announced his retirement from politics soon afterwards.

Fildebrandt went on to win the riding by a huge margin over PC candidate Molly Douglass in the 2015 general election. Fildebrandt was subsequently appointed the Official Opposition Shadow Minister of Finance and Chairman of the Public Accounts Committee.

On July 22, Wildrose and PC members voted to join and form the United Conservative Party of Alberta (UCP). Fildebrandt was officially recognized as a UCP MLA on July 24. However, he was again removed from caucus and, this time, permanently banned from re-joining the UCP after a string of scandals including an illegal hunting charge that had not been disclosed to the party.

In 2018 Fildebrandt joined, and became leader of, the Freedom Conservative Party of Alberta (previously known as Alberta First, the Separation Party of Alberta, and the Western Freedom Party).

== Legislative election results ==
=== 1997 ===
1997 Alberta general election
Party	Candidate	Votes	%	±%
Progressive Conservative	Lyle Oberg	7,235	72.57%	–
Liberal	Roger Nelson	1,272	12.76%	–
Social Credit	Dan Borden	862	8.65%	–
New Democratic	Richard Knutson	600	6.02%	–
Total		9,969	–	–
Rejected, spoiled and declined		24	–	–
Eligible electors / turnout		21,271	46.98%	–
Progressive Conservative pickup new district.				
Source(s) Source: "Strathmore-Brooks Official Results 1997 Alberta general election". Alberta Heritage Community Foundation.

=== 2001 ===
2001 Alberta general election
Party	Candidate	Votes	%	±%
Progressive Conservative	Lyle Oberg	8,585	75.09%	2.51%
Liberal	Barry Morishita	1,774	15.52%	2.76%
Independent	Christopher Sutherland	511	4.47%	–
New Democratic	Don MacFarlane	290	2.54%	-3.48%
Social Credit	Rudy Martens	273	2.39%	-6.26%
Total		11,433	–	–
Rejected, spoiled and declined		29	–	–
Eligible electors / turnout		24,372	47.03%	0.05%
Progressive Conservative hold		Swing		-0.12%
Source(s) Source: "Strathmore-Brooks Official Results 2001 Alberta general election". Alberta Heritage Community Foundation.

=== 2004 ===
2004 Alberta general election
Party	Candidate	Votes	%	±%
Progressive Conservative	Lyle Oberg	5,916	64.05%	-11.04%
Liberal	Carrol Jaques	1,178	12.75%	-2.76%
Alberta Alliance	Mark D. Ogden	831	9.00%	–
Separation	Jay Kolody	576	6.24%	–
New Democratic	Don MacFarlane	416	4.50%	1.97%
Social Credit	Rudy Martens	319	3.45%	1.07%
Total		9,236	–	–
Rejected, spoiled and declined		67	–	–
Eligible electors / turnout		25,686	36.22%	-10.81%
Progressive Conservative hold		Swing		-4.14%
Source(s) Source:"79 - Strathmore-Brooks Statement of Official Results 2004 Alberta general election" (PDF). Elections Alberta.

=== 2008 ===
2008 Alberta general election
Party	Candidate	Votes	%	±%
Progressive Conservative	Arno Doerksen	7,623	74.56	10.51
Liberal	Gerry Hart	991	9.69	-3.06
Wildrose Alliance	Amanda H. Shehata	935	9.15	0.15
Green	Chris Bayford	362	3.54	–
New Democratic	Brian Stokes	313	3.06	-1.44
Total		10,224	99.47	–
Rejected, spoiled and declined		54	0.53	–
Turnout		10,278	33.02	
Eligible electors		31,127		
Progressive Conservative hold		Swing		6.78
Source(s) Source: The Report on the March 3, 2008 Provincial General Election of the Twenty-seventh Legislative Assembly. Elections Alberta. July 28, 2008. pp. 548–551.

=== 2012 ===
2012 Alberta general election
Party	Candidate	Votes	%	±%
Wildrose	Jason Hale	8,157	55.58	+46.44
Progressive Conservative	Arno Doerksen	5,743	39.13	-35.43
New Democratic	Brad Bailey	409	2.79	-0.27
Liberal	Alex Wychopen	299	2.04	-7.66
Separation	Glen Dundas	68	0.46	–
Total		14,676	99.31	–
Rejected, spoiled and declined		102	0.69	+0.16
Turnout		14,778	52.79	+19.77
Eligible electors		27,996		
Wildrose gain from Progressive Conservative		Swing		+40.93
Source(s) Source: "83 - Strathmore-Brooks Official Results 2012 Alberta general election". officialresults.elections.ab.ca. Elections Alberta.

=== 2015 ===
2015 Alberta general election
Party	Candidate	Votes	%	±%
Wildrose	Derek Fildebrandt	8,652	52.55	-3.03
Progressive Conservative	Molly Douglass	4,452	27.04	-12.09
New Democratic	Lynn MacWilliam	2,463	14.96	+12.17
Green	Mike Worthington	322	1.96	–
Alberta Party	Einar Davison	304	1.85	–
Liberal	Ali Abdulbaki	200	1.21	-0.82
Alberta First	Glen Dundas	72	0.44	-0.03
Total		16,465	99.49	–
Rejected, spoiled and declined		85	0.51	-0.18
Turnout		16,550	49.83	-2.96
Eligible electors		33,215		
Wildrose hold		Swing		4.53
Source(s) Source: "83 - Strathmore-Brooks Official Results 2015 Alberta general election". officialresults.elections.ab.ca. Elections Alberta.

^ Alberta First change calculated from Separation Party.

== Senate nominee election results ==
=== 2004 ===
2004 Senate nominee election results: Strathmore-Brooks				Turnout 36.18%	
Affiliation	Candidate	Votes	% votes	% ballots	Rank
Progressive Conservative	Bert Brown	4,999	18.61%	59.79%	1
Progressive Conservative	Betty Unger	3,754	13.98%	44.90%	2
Progressive Conservative	Jim Silye	3,160	11.77%	37.80%	5
Progressive Conservative	Cliff Breitkreuz	2,949	10.98%	35.27%	3
Progressive Conservative	David Usherwood	2,651	9.87%	31.71%	6
Independent	Link Byfield	2,546	9.48%	30.45%	4
Alberta Alliance	Vance Gough	1,972	7.34%	23.59%	8
Alberta Alliance	Michael Roth	1,957	7.29%	23.41%	7
Alberta Alliance	Gary Horan	1,598	5.95%	19.11%	10
Independent	Tom Sindlinger	1,271	4.73%	15.20%	9
Total votes		26,857	100%		
Total ballots		8,361	3.21 votes per ballot		
Rejected, spoiled and declined		932			

Voters had the option of selecting four candidates on the ballot.

== Student vote results ==
=== 2004 ===
Participating schools
Eastbrook Elementary
Hussar School
Lathom Colony School
Newell Christian School
Sacred Heart Academy
Strathmore High School

On November 19, 2004, a student vote was conducted at participating Alberta schools to parallel the 2004 Alberta general election results. The vote was designed to educate students and simulate the electoral process for persons who had not yet reached the legal majority. The vote was conducted in 80 of the 83 provincial electoral districts with students voting for actual election candidates. Schools with a large student body that resided in another electoral district had the option to vote for candidates outside of the electoral district than where they were physically located.

2004 Alberta student vote results
Affiliation	Candidate	Votes	%
Progressive Conservative	Lyle Oberg	319	47.12%
Liberal	Carrol Jaques	112	16.54%
Separation	Jay Kolody	86	12.70%
Alberta Alliance	Mark Ogden	69	10.19%
NDP	Don Macfarlane	67	9.90%
Social Credit	Rudy Martens	24	3.55%
Total		677	100%
Rejected, spoiled and declined		24	

=== 2012 ===
2012 Alberta student vote results
Affiliation	Candidate	Votes	%
Progressive Conservative	Arno Doerksen		%
Wildrose	Jason Hale		
Liberal	Alex Wychopen		%
NDP	Brad Bailey		%
Total			100%

== See also ==
- List of Alberta provincial electoral districts
- Canadian provincial electoral districts
- Brooks, a city in southern Alberta
- Strathmore, a town in southern Alberta
