= Arno Doerksen =

Canadian politician

MLA for Strathmore-Brooks
- In office March 3, 2008 – April 23, 2012
- Preceded by: Lyle Oberg
- Succeeded by: Jason Hale

Personal details
- Born: January 25, 1958 (age 68) Bassano, Alberta
- Party: Progressive Conservative
- Spouse: Wanda
- Children: Barry, Daniel, and Lorin
- Occupation: rancher, farmer

Arno Doerksen (born January 25, 1958) is a Canadian politician. A member of the Progressive Conservative Association of Alberta, Doerksen served as a member of the Alberta Legislature for the Strathmore-Brooks district from 2008 to 2012.

== Early life ==
Doerksen was born in the town of Bassano, Alberta, Canada and raised in Gem. He spent more than 25 years in farming and ranching before entering politics. He is a purebred and commercial cattle producer and feedlot operator in partnership with his family. They grow alfalfa, grain and oilseed crops on irrigated land in the Eastern Irrigation District.

== Political career ==
Doerksen won the 2008 provincial election with 75 per cent of the vote in the constituency of Strathmore-Brooks. He was a member of the Private Bills Committee, the Privileges and Elections, Standing Orders and Printing Committee, and the Standing Committee on Community Services. Doerksen chairs the Endangered Species Conservation Committee. More information about Arno Doerksen is available from his website at ArnoDoerksen.ca.

== Personal life ==
Doerksen lives with his wife Wanda in Gem, Alberta. They have three sons: Barry, Daniel and Lorin. His community involvement includes the Gem Curling Club, Gem Grazing Association, Gem Home and School Association, his local church board and Camp Evergreen.

Doerksen was chair of the Alberta Beef Producers during the BSE (mad cow disease) crisis in 2003 and 2004. He has travelled internationally as a representative of Alberta and Canada's livestock industry. Doerksen chaired the Canada Beef Export Federation from 2006 to 2008.

In 2004, Doerksen was named one of the 50 most influential Albertans in Alberta Venture. He has received a 10-year leadership award from the Canadian 4-H Council.

== Election results ==
2008 Alberta general election: Strathmore-Brooks
Party	Candidate	Votes	%	±%
Progressive Conservative	Arno Doerksen	7,623	74.56	10.51
Liberal	Gerry Hart	991	9.69	-3.06
Wildrose Alliance	Amanda H. Shehata	935	9.15	0.15
Green	Chris Bayford	362	3.54	–
New Democratic	Brian Stokes	313	3.06	-1.44
Total		10,224	99.47	–
Rejected, spoiled and declined		54	0.53	–
Turnout		10,278	33.02	
Eligible electors		31,127		
Progressive Conservative hold		Swing		6.78
Source(s) Source: The Report on the March 3, 2008 Provincial General Election of the Twenty-seventh Legislative Assembly. Elections Alberta. July 28, 2008. pp. 548–551.

2012 Alberta general election: Strathmore-Brooks
Party	Candidate	Votes	%	±%
Wildrose	Jason Hale	8,157	55.58	+46.44
Progressive Conservative	Arno Doerksen	5,743	39.13	-35.43
New Democratic	Brad Bailey	409	2.79	-0.27
Liberal	Alex Wychopen	299	2.04	-7.66
Separation	Glen Dundas	68	0.46	–
Total		14,676	99.31	–
Rejected, spoiled and declined		102	0.69	+0.16
Turnout		14,778	52.79	+19.77
Eligible electors		27,996		
Wildrose gain from Progressive Conservative		Swing		+40.93
Source(s) Source: "83 - Strathmore-Brooks Official Results 2012 Alberta general election". officialresults.elections.ab.ca. Elections Alberta.
