= Leela Aheer =

Canadian politician

The Honourable Leela Aheer ECA
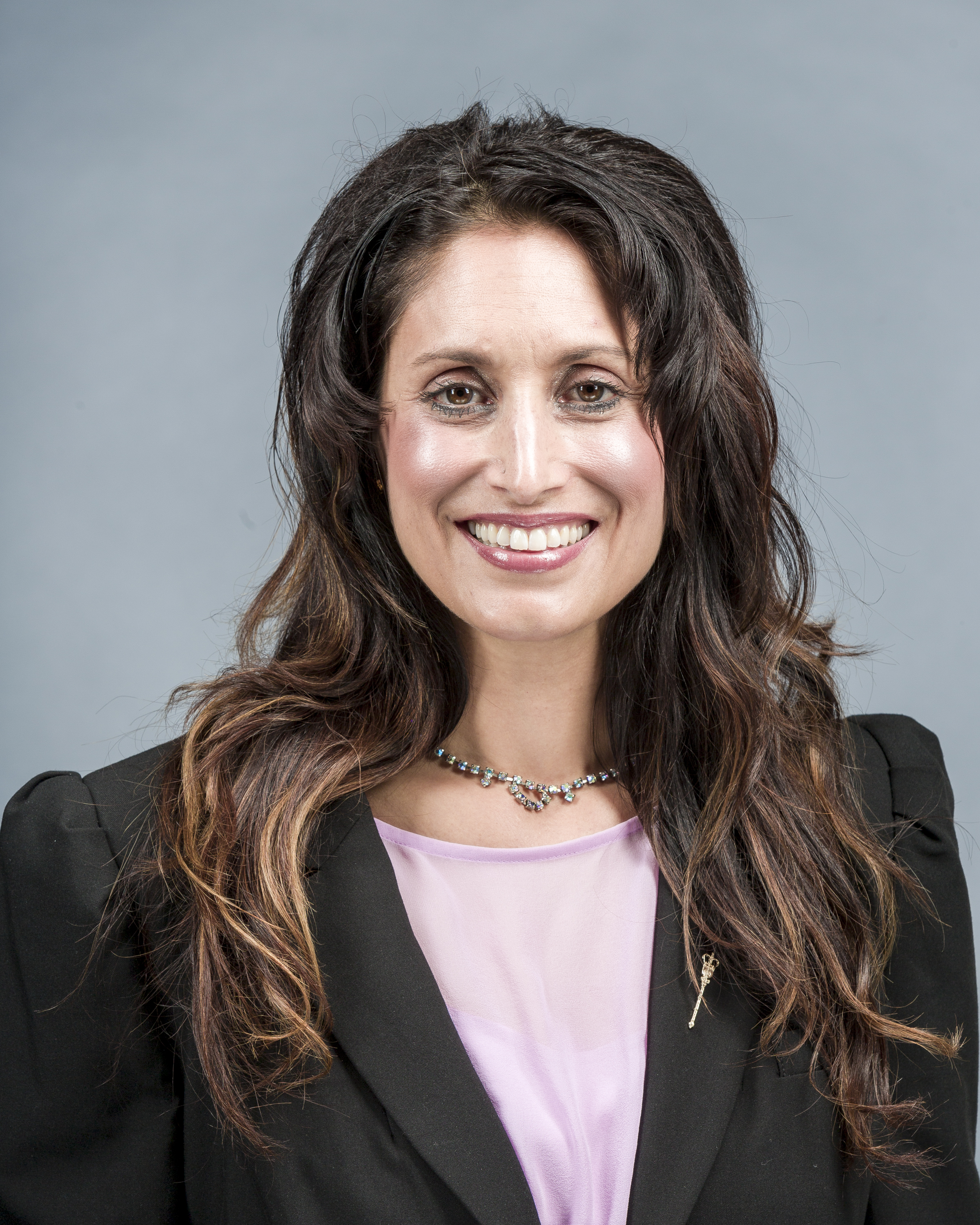
- Aheer in 2015

Minister of Culture, Multiculturalism & Status of Women
- In office April 30, 2019 – July 8, 2021
- Premier: Jason Kenney
- Preceded by: Danielle Larivee
- Succeeded by: Ron Orr

Deputy Leader of the United Conservative Party
- In office October 30, 2017 – July 8, 2021
- Leader: Jason Kenney
- Preceded by: Mike Ellis
- Succeeded by: Vacant

Member of the Alberta Legislative Assembly for Chestermere-Strathmore Chestermere-Rocky View (2015–2019)
- In office May 5, 2015 – May 1, 2023
- Preceded by: Bruce McAllister
- Succeeded by: Chantelle de Jonge

Personal details
- Born: Leela Sharon Aheer; September 26, 1970 (age 56) Edmonton, Alberta, Canada
- Party: United Conservative
- Other political affiliations: Wildrose (2015–2017)
- Education: University of Calgary; University of Manitoba (B.M.)
- Occupation: Business owner, music teacher

Leela Sharon Aheer ECA (born September 26, 1970) is a Canadian politician who served as a member of the Legislative Assembly of Alberta (MLA) representing the electoral district of Chestermere-Rocky View from 2015 to 2019 and later Chestermere-Strathmore from 2019 to 2023. She was also an unsuccessful candidate in the 2022 United Conservative Party leadership election.

== Early life and career ==
Aheer was born in Edmonton in 1970 and moved with her family to Chestermere in 1979. Aheer comes from a Telugu family. After graduating from Chestermere High School in 1988, Aheer spent ten months in South India, where her family originated.

Aheer began her university education in Political Science at the University of Calgary, but transferred to the University of Manitoba to earn a Bachelor of Music degree. Post-graduation, she taught music for 22 years and was involved in family-owned businesses, including property investment, a car wash, and a gas station.

== Political career ==
=== Wildrose MLA ===
Aheer defeated incumbent Wildrose-turned-PC MLA Bruce McAllister by a slim margin in 2015, becoming the second member to represent Chestermere-Rocky View.

=== UCP Deputy Leader ===
Aheer supported the merger between Wildrose and the PCs based on the desires of her constituents. On October 30, 2017, Aheer was appointed deputy leader of the United Conservative Party by newly elected leader Jason Kenney. She expressed surprise at Kenney's move, describing herself as a "very centrist conservative" who might challenge some of his views.

As deputy leader, she urged delegates at the founding UCP policy convention not to adopt an anti-GSA motion as official party policy. It passed with 57% support.

She presumably ceased to be Deputy Leader on July 8, 2021, when she was shuffled out of cabinet.

=== Minister of Culture, Multiculturalism, and Status of Women ===
On April 30, 2019, Leela Aheer was appointed Alberta's Minister of Culture, Multiculturalism, and Status of Women.

As Minister, Aheer introduced Alberta's version of Clare's Law in tandem with Alberta's Minister of Community and Social Services, Rajan Sawhney. The legislation aims to empower those at potential risk of a domestic violence relationship to have access to information about their partner's criminal history and attempts to provide those at risk of domestic violence with fuller awareness of an intimate partner's previous history of domestic violence or violent acts.

She was removed from her position on July 8, 2021 after criticizing Jason Kenney.

=== UCP Leadership Campaign ===
On June 8, 2022, Aheer announced her candidacy in the 2022 United Conservative Party leadership election at an event in Chestermere. In August, Aheer helped rescue a rodeo participant in Strathmore, Alberta by grabbing a charging bull by its horns keep the bull back. Others had joined Aheer to intervene to stop the charging bull.

In August, Aheer was cleared of violations of the Election Finances and Contributions Disclosure Act. She was originally fined for allegedly exceeding the contribution limit but was cleared by Calgary Court of Queen's Bench which rescinded the finding by the Alberta Elections Commissioner.

After her first-ballot defeat in the leadership race, Aheer announced she would not be running for the United Conservative Party in the next provincial election, saying "I chose to run for the UCP leadership to reflect my commitment and values and give back to the province that has given so much to my family and me, but the members have stated their wishes for leadership and a new direction for our party. I respect their decision.”

Following Ron Liepert's announcement that he would not be running in the 45th Canadian federal election, Aheer announced that she was seeking the Conservative Party of Canada nomination for Calgary Signal Hill.

== Electoral history ==
=== 2019 general election ===
2019 Alberta general election: Chestermere-Strathmore
Party	Candidate	Votes	%	±%
United Conservative	Leela Sharon Aheer	15,612	68.48	-3.57
New Democratic	Melissa Langmaid	3,558	15.61	-2.69
Freedom Conservative	Derek Fildebrandt	1,683	7.38	–
Alberta Party	Jason Avramenko	1,460	6.40	+5.49
Liberal	Sharon L. Howe	238	1.04	+0.46
Alberta Independence	Roger Dean Walker	136	0.60	–
Independent	Terry Nicholls	112	0.49	–
Total		22,799	99.25	–
Rejected, spoiled and declined		173	0.75	
Turnout		22,972	67.12	
Eligible voters		34,226		
United Conservative notional hold		Swing		-0.44
Source(s) Source: "56 - Chestermere-Strathmore, 2019 Alberta general election". officialresults.elections.ab.ca. Elections Alberta. Alberta. Chief Electoral Officer (2019). 2019 General Election. A Report of the Chief Electoral Officer. Volume II (PDF) (Report). Vol. 2. Edmonton, Alta.: Elections Alberta. pp. 243–248. ISBN 978-1-988620-12-1.

=== 2015 general election ===
2015 Alberta general election: Chestermere-Rocky View
Party	Candidate	Votes	%	±%
Wildrose	Leela Aheer	7,676	37.04%	-21.32%
Progressive Conservative	Bruce McAllister	7,454	35.97%	0.64%
New Democratic	William James Pelech	3,706	17.88%	14.80%
Independent	Jamie Lall	1,093	5.27%	–
Green	Coral Bliss Taylor	405	1.95%	–
Independent	Matt Grant	391	1.89%	–
Total		20,725	–	–
Rejected, spoiled and declined		91	–	–
Eligible electors / turnout		34,928	59.60%	4.38%
Wildrose hold		Swing		-10.98%
Source(s) Source: "54 - Chestermere-Rocky View Official Results 2015 Alberta general election". officialresults.elections.ab.ca. Elections Alberta.

Alberta provincial government of Jason Kenney
Cabinet posts (2)
Predecessor	Office	Successor
Danielle Larivee	Minister of Status of Women; April 30, 2019 - July 8, 2021;	renamed to Alberta Culture and Status of Women
Ricardo Miranda	Minister of Culture & Multiculturalism; April 30, 2019 - July 8, 2021;	Ron Orr
