= Chantelle de Jonge =

Canadian politician from Alberta

Chantelle de Jonge MLA

Member of the Legislative Assembly of Alberta for Chestermere-Strathmore
- Incumbent
- Assumed office May 29, 2023
- Preceded by: Leela Aheer

Personal details
- Party: UCP
- Education: University of Calgary BA (Econ)

Chantelle de Jonge is a Canadian politician from the United Conservative Party. She was elected member of the Legislative Assembly of Alberta for Chestermere-Strathmore in the 2023 Alberta general election.

== Early life and education ==
She was born and raised in rural Southern Alberta. She graduated from the University of Calgary with a Bachelor of Arts in Economics and Philosophy in 2021.

== Electoral history ==
=== 2023 general election ===
2023 Alberta general election: Chestermere-Strathmore
Party	Candidate	Votes	%	±%
United Conservative	Chantelle de Jonge	15,362	69.68	+1.20
New Democratic	Raj Jessel	6,119	27.75	+12.15
Alberta Independence	Kerry Lambert	264	1.20	+0.60
Independent	Terry Nicholls	258	1.17	+0.68
Solidarity Movement	Jed Laboucane	45	0.20	–
Total		22,048	99.29	–
Rejected and declined		158	0.71	
Turnout		22,206	58.18	
Eligible voters		38,167		
United Conservative hold		Swing		-5.47
Source(s) Source: Elections Alberta

UCP Chestermere-Strathmore nomination contest: December 17, 2022

Candidate	Votes	%
Chantelle de Jonge	1,118	62.8
Dharminder Premi	663	37.2
Total	1,781	100.0
