= Derek Fildebrandt =

Canadian journalist and former politician

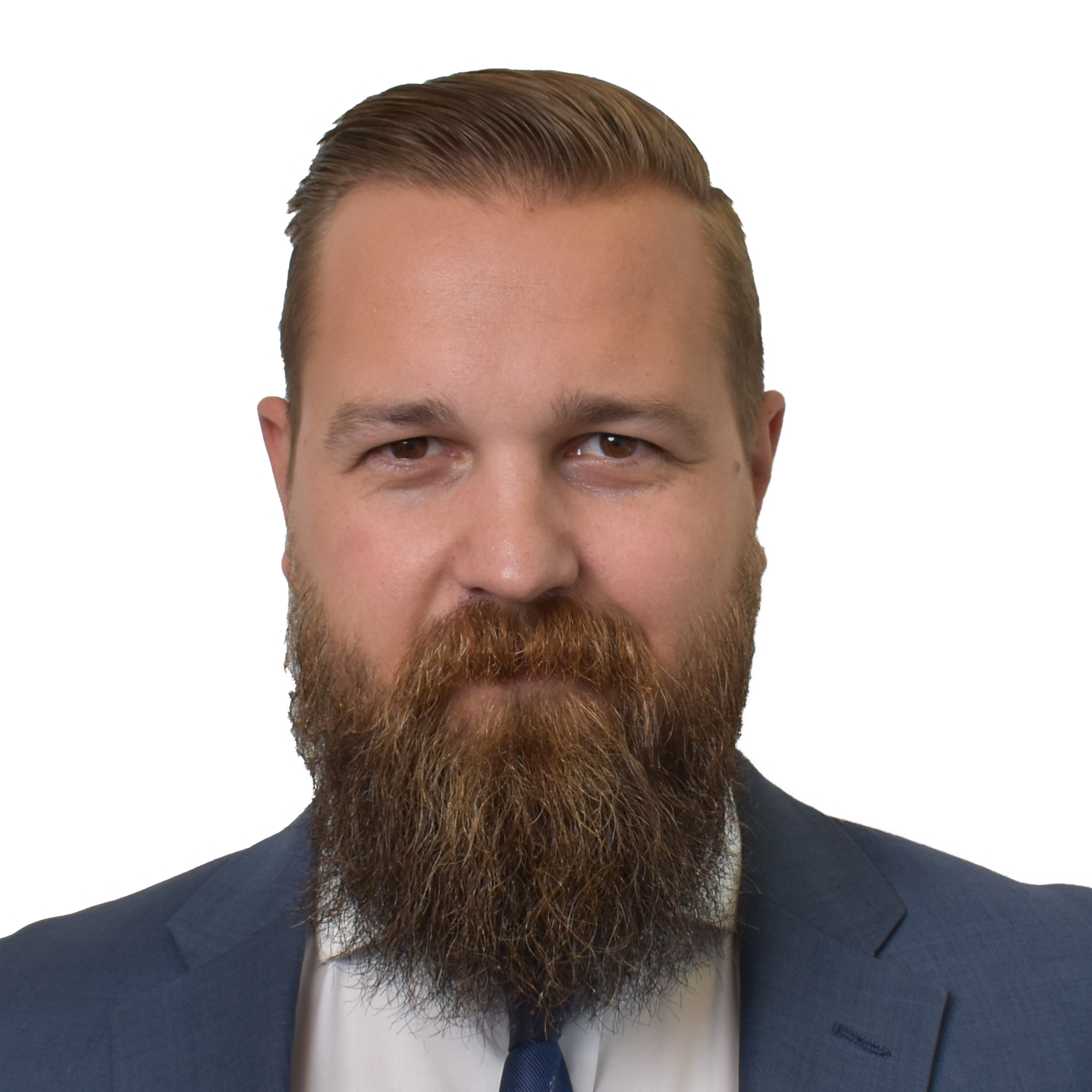

Leader of the Freedom Conservative Party of Alberta
- In office 20 October 2018 (Note: Fildebrandt served as Interim Leader from 20 July 2018 to 20 October 2018.) – 30 April 2019
- Preceded by: Position established
- Succeeded by: David White (interim)

Member of the Legislative Assembly of Alberta for Strathmore-Brooks
- In office 5 May 2015 – 16 April 2019
- Preceded by: Jason Hale
- Succeeded by: riding abolished

Personal details
- Born: Derek Alexander Gerhard Fildebrandt; 18 October 1985 (age 40) Kanata, Ontario, Canada
- Other political affiliations: Wildrose (2015–2016; 2016–2017); United Conservative (2017); Independent (2016; 2017–2018); Freedom Conservative (2018–2020)
- Spouse: Emma Fildebrandt
- Education: Carleton University
- Occupation: Publisher, President & CEO of Wildrose Media Corp.

Derek Alexander Gerhard Fildebrandt (born 18 October 1985) is a Canadian journalist and former politician who is the publisher, president and chief executive officer of the Western Standard New Media Corp. He is a former member of the Legislative Assembly of Alberta.

== Canadian Taxpayers Federation ==
After working in Ottawa as a National Research Director, Fildebrandt moved to Alberta in 2012 when he was promoted to the post of Alberta Director.

In February 2014, Fildebrandt released the CTF's balanced budget plan calling for $2.4 billion in spending cuts to business subsidies and the bureaucracy. In May 2014 he spoke out about buyout payments to political appointees. He was a conservative critic of former PC Premier Jim Prentice, calling him a "tax and spend liberal." During the Alberta PC leadership race, he filed Freedom of Information requests for Jim Prentice's federal expense records, releasing them in September 2014 which came after controversy about alleged irregularities in the destruction of the records.

Fildebrandt was credited by the Calgary Sun with playing a significant role in the downfall of former Alberta Premier Alison Redford and former Alberta Finance Minister Doug Horner. His term as Alberta Director of the CTF ended in November 2014.

== Political career ==
On 26 January 2015, Fildebrandt announced that he would seek the Wildrose Party nomination in Strathmore-Brooks. He was named as the candidate on 6 February 2015. In response to PC challenges to the Wildrose's budget plan, Fildebrandt challenged Finance Minister Robin Campbell to a debate, which Campbell refused. On 5 May 2015, he was elected as the MLA for Strathmore-Brooks.

On 11 May 2015, Fildebrandt was appointed Shadow Finance Minister in the Wildrose Official Opposition Cabinet by Brian Jean. He has advocated for healthcare and seniors care infrastructure in his constituency. Fildebrandt has criticized the NDP for tax increases, deficit spending and its relationship with public sector unions.

He made several public statements throughout 2016, but most notoriously on 14 December 2016, when he broke ranks with Brian Jean and openly called for a merger of the Wildrose and PC Parties. One month later, Jean released a statement in favour of uniting the parties on the same day that Fildebrandt held a fundraiser at the Calgary Petroleum Club calling for a single united party.

=== Federal politics ===
Fildebrandt supported Maxime Bernier for the Conservative Party of Canada leadership in 2017. Filderbrandt explained that he left the federal Conservative party after the 2009 auto bailout and Bernier's leadership run drew him back into the party.

=== United Conservative Party ===
On 18 May 2017, Brian Jean and Jason Kenney signed an agreement in principle to create the United Conservative Party (UCP) of Alberta. Fildebrandt publicly mused about running in the UCP leadership election, but decided against it, announcing he would instead endorse a candidate other than Brian Jean.

In 2017, Fildebrandt launched his PAC called United Liberty which is based on libertarian policies such as lower taxes, and less government control.

In August 2017, Fildebrandt left the UCP caucus after a series of incidents to sit as an independent (see #Controversies).

During the UCP leadership election, Jason Kenney implied that Mr. Fildebrandt could be welcomed back to the UCP caucus so long as his legal battles were eventually sorted out stating, "I don't see us dealing with any prospective admission … until all of that's been dealt with."

In February 2018 the leader of the UCP Jason Kenney announced that Fildebrandt was not welcome in the UCP Caucus. Kenney commented: "I can only conclude that Mr. Fildebrandt deliberately misled us in refusing to disclose this outstanding charge." Fildebrandt continued in his electoral riding as an independent. Fildebrandt claimed that he was given an ultimatum by Kenney who wanted to run MLA Leela Aheer in the new combined riding of Chestermere-Strathmore. Fildebrandt said he was told by Mr. Kenney that "if I wanted to return... I couldn't run in my own constituency."

=== Freedom Conservative Party of Alberta ===
On 20 July 2018, Derek Fildebrandt formed the Freedom Conservative Party of Alberta. "We in the FCP are conservatives, libertarians and Alberta patriots," said Fildebrandt. In his speech Fildebrandt stated that the party was a true grassroots party that would not adhere to backroom political games. Fildebrandt was acclaimed leader for the party on 20 October 2018.

His bid to remain in the Alberta Legislative Assembly failed, as he was defeated by Leela Aheer whilst running in Chestermere-Strathmore in the 2019 Alberta general election, garnering less than 10% of the vote.

On 30 April 2019, after failing to win any seats in the legislature, Fildebrandt announced his resignation as Freedom Conservative Party Leader.

After his loss, Fildebrandt told the media he was returning to private life to "get a real job, make some money. Honestly, I’m happy to be done with politics. I’m happy to have my family back, to have a sense of private life back."

=== Western Standard ===
On 23 October 2019 Fildebrandt bought and relaunched the Western Standard online newspaper, a right wing publication that had ceased operations in 2007.

In May 2022, Fildebrandt announced that Western Standard New Media Corp. had acquired the Alberta Report and was relaunching it.

== Controversies ==
On 27 May 2016, Wildrose leader Brian Jean suspended Fildebrandt for an indefinite period of time after he wrote "Proud to have constituents like you!" in response to a comment referring to Ontario premier Kathleen Wynne as "Mr. Wynne, or whatever the hell she identifies as" which Jean called "unacceptable." This came on the heels of an incident where Fildebrandt criticised Premier Wynne in the Alberta Legislature as Wynne sat in the gallery as a guest. Fildebrandt said he "entirely misread" the original comment. On Tuesday, 31 May, he was reinstated into the Wildrose Caucus and as the Opposition Shadow Minister of Finance.

Also in 2016, Fildebrandt was accused of hitting his neighbour's parked vehicle with his truck, causing an estimated $2000 in damage and driving off. He appeared in court to plea not guilty and denied it happened, saying "I would've left a note on the front windshield. It's the decent thing to do." On 4 December 2017, Fildebrandt was fined $402 under the Alberta Highways Traffic Act.

On 9 August 2017, it was reported that Fildebrandt was renting out his Edmonton apartment on Airbnb while claiming a housing allowance from the Legislature of Alberta to pay for the apartment. He initially defended himself, calling the act "reasonable and a part of the modern sharing economy." Later, Fildebrandt apologized and claimed that he returned the income made from the property.

In August 2017, Alberta Party Leader Greg Clark alleged that Fildebrandt had double-charged for meals and MLA expenses. Fildebrandt ordered an investigation and found a total of $192.60 over a period of two years due to “administrative errors.”

On 13 December 2017, Fildebrandt was charged with trespassing onto private property and hunting a white-tailed deer in violation of the Wildlife Act. Fildebrandt apologized, claiming that he didn't know he was on private property and that he donated the deer to a food bank.

On 23 May 2024, Fildebrandt was charged with uttering threats against teenagers that he believed had been vandalizing his property weeks after the incident took place. The teenagers alleged that Fildebrandt chased them with a shotgun, which the court ruled during the trial was a walking cane that he used due to a motorcycle accident. The court also ruled that the teenagers had collaborated their stories before giving statements to police.

The court acquitted Fildebrandt on all counts. The crown later appealed the acquittal but withdrew its appeal in March 2025.

In a statement after the withdraw of the crown's appeal, Fildebrandt alleged that Calgary Police Detective Lindsay Audibert “Is unfit for her job. She laid charges that were clearly groundless after her colleagues on the scene dismissed it. She clearly had some reason beyond proper application of the law to come after me. I am filling a formal complaint against her with the Calgary Police Commission.”

Fildebrandt also claimed, “Crown prosecutor Stephanie Morton is painfully incompetent. A prosecutor is expected to triage the cases that come before them, determining which are most serious and have a good chance of obtaining a conviction. Holding my 12-gauge walking cane as vandals flee my property does not hold up on either account. She is either incompetent in the extreme or was under orders from someone else who needs to be held to account.”

== Electoral history ==
=== 2019 general election ===
2019 Alberta general election: Chestermere-Strathmore
Party	Candidate	Votes	%	±%
United Conservative	Leela Sharon Aheer	15,612	68.48	-3.57
New Democratic	Melissa Langmaid	3,558	15.61	-2.69
Freedom Conservative	Derek Fildebrandt	1,683	7.38	–
Alberta Party	Jason Avramenko	1,460	6.40	+5.49
Liberal	Sharon L. Howe	238	1.04	+0.46
Alberta Independence	Roger Dean Walker	136	0.60	–
Independent	Terry Nicholls	112	0.49	–
Total		22,799	99.25	–
Rejected, spoiled and declined		173	0.75	
Turnout		22,972	67.12	
Eligible voters		34,226		
United Conservative notional hold		Swing		-0.44
Source(s) Source: "56 - Chestermere-Strathmore, 2019 Alberta general election". officialresults.elections.ab.ca. Elections Alberta. Alberta. Chief Electoral Officer (2019). 2019 General Election. A Report of the Chief Electoral Officer. Volume II (PDF) (Report). Vol. 2. Edmonton, Alta.: Elections Alberta. pp. 243–248. ISBN 978-1-988620-12-1.

=== 2015 general election ===
2015 Alberta general election: Strathmore-Brooks
Party	Candidate	Votes	%	±%
Wildrose	Derek Fildebrandt	8,652	52.55	-3.03
Progressive Conservative	Molly Douglass	4,452	27.04	-12.09
New Democratic	Lynn MacWilliam	2,463	14.96	+12.17
Green	Mike Worthington	322	1.96	–
Alberta Party	Einar Davison	304	1.85	–
Liberal	Ali Abdulbaki	200	1.21	-0.82
Alberta First	Glen Dundas	72	0.44	-0.03
Total		16,465	99.49	–
Rejected, spoiled and declined		85	0.51	-0.18
Turnout		16,550	49.83	-2.96
Eligible electors		33,215		
Wildrose hold		Swing		4.53
Source(s) Source: "83 - Strathmore-Brooks Official Results 2015 Alberta general election". officialresults.elections.ab.ca. Elections Alberta.
