= Lyle Oberg =

Canadian politician

The Honourable Lyle Oberg ECA

MLA for Strathmore-Brooks
- In office 11 March 1997 – 3 March 2008
- Preceded by: district created
- Succeeded by: Arno Doerksen

MLA for Bow Valley
- In office 1993–1997
- Preceded by: Tom Musgrove
- Succeeded by: district abolished

Personal details
- Born: Lyle Knute Oberg; 6 January 1960 (age 66) near Forestburg, Alberta
- Party: Progressive Conservative (1993–2011); Wildrose (2011–present)

Lyle Knute Oberg ECA (born January 6, 1960) is a Canadian politician, business executive, and former member of the Legislative Assembly in Alberta. He is also a physician.

== Life and career ==
Oberg was born near Forestburg, Alberta in 1960. A physician by profession, Oberg was first elected to the MLA as a member of the Progressive Conservative in 1993. He was first appointed to the Alberta Cabinet in 1997 and served in numerous posts. Oberg was appointed Minister of Family and Social Services in March 1997. Over the next two years, he oversaw the move of children's services and services for persons with developmental disabilities to community-based delivery. He launched a western Canadian initiative to address Fetal Alcohol Syndrome and implemented an interprovincial strategy to share resources and develop new approaches for addressing FAS. As part of the Alberta Children's Agenda, he introduced the Alberta Child Health Benefit Program and played a role in the development of the Protection of Children Involved in Prostitution Act.

On May 26, 1999, Oberg was appointed Minister of Learning, a post he held until November 2004. During this appointment, he awarded a 14% increase to Alberta's teachers but only granted a 6% increase to the school boards. To cover this funding shortfall, Calgary school boards took funding from school maintenance, leading to issues with school roofs collapsing. During that time, he also served as a member of the Treasury Board and as the Minister responsible for immigration. Oberg was an active member of the Canadian Ministers of Education and led the Canadian delegation to an International Group of Eight (G8) Education Ministers meeting. He oversaw the creation of Alberta's Commission on Learning and implemented many of its recommendations, including the reduction of provincial class sizes. He began the second language initiative in Alberta schools to give students an edge in the world marketplace and initiated the development of the daily physical activity program to improve the health of Alberta students.

Following his re-election in the November 22, 2004 election, Oberg was appointed Minister of Infrastructure and Transportation.

On March 22, 2006, shortly after announcing his resignation from his ministerial position following a directive from Premier Ralph Klein to all ministers running to replace him, Oberg was removed from the Progressive Conservative caucus after making comments at a Strathmore-Brooks Constituency Association annual general meeting, urging the membership to vote their conscience in a crucial leadership vote at the March 2006 AGM of the party. He was re-admitted to caucus on July 25, 2006.

On June 19, 2006, Oberg entered the race for the leadership of the Progressive Conservative Party in Alberta. He failed to place in the top three in the November 25 first ballot (he placed fourth) and was not eligible for the second ballot to be held on December 2. Oberg's allegations of scandal regarding front runner Jim Dinning in the summer of 2006 appeared to have had a negative effect on his campaign. He later threw his support to third-place finisher and eventual winner Ed Stelmach.

On December 15, 2006, Oberg was named Minister of Finance in Premier Ed Stelmach's cabinet.

Oberg announced in December 2007 that he would not seek re-election in the next election in March 2008.

On June 2, 2010, Oberg opened C2DNA in Edmonton, the first private DNA testing facility in Canada. He founded the lab with his brother and other investors. He stepped down as president and CEO the following day to avoid any conflict of interest arising from a medical doctor being involved with such a high tech company, but said he would remain an advisor.

On March 1, 2011, Oberg announced that he was joining the right-wing Wildrose Alliance Party. He said he would not be running for office but would participate in an advisory role to party leader Danielle Smith. He cited the Conservative government's decision to abolish the multiple health districts in Alberta and replace them with an Edmonton-based super board, and the recently announced deficit budget (the fourth in as many years) as his reasons for the switch.

In November 2023, Alberta Premier Danielle Smith announced Oberg as the new chair of the board of Alberta Health Services.

== After politics ==
He is chief executive officer of MYND Life Sciences Inc., a Canadian company that has developed biomarker test technology which will be used in a clinical trial of psilocybin-assisted psychotherapy. He has also served on the boards of other companies.

Alberta provincial government of Ed Stelmach
Cabinet post (1)
| Predecessor | Office | Successor |
|---|---|---|
| Shirley McClellan | Minister of Finance; 2006 to 2008 | Iris Evans |
Legislative Assembly of Alberta
| Preceded by Tom Musgrove | MLA Bow Valley; 1993-1997 | Succeeded by District Abolished |
| Preceded by New District | MLA Strathmore-Brooks; 1997-2008 | Succeeded by Arno Doerksen |
