= 2015 Alberta general election =

29th general election of Alberta, Canada

- May 5, 2015

87 seats in the Legislative Assembly of Alberta 44 seats needed for a majority
- Opinion polls
- Turnout: 57.0%
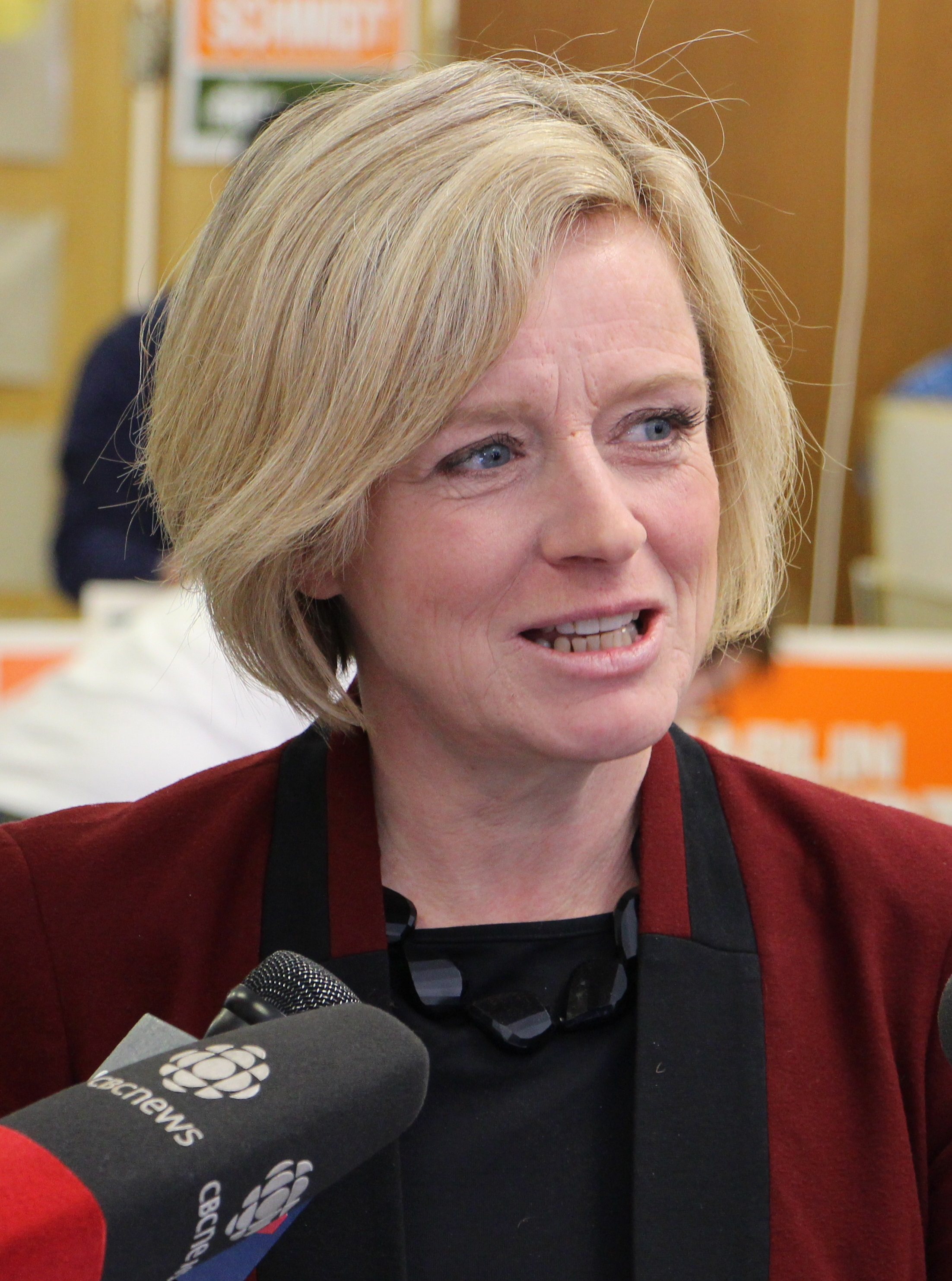

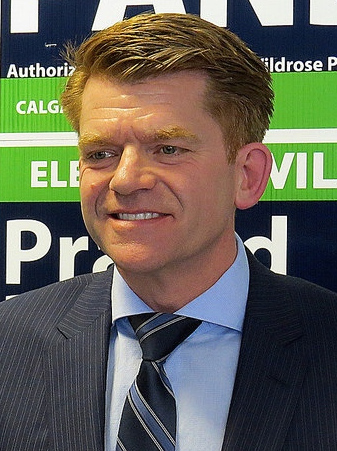

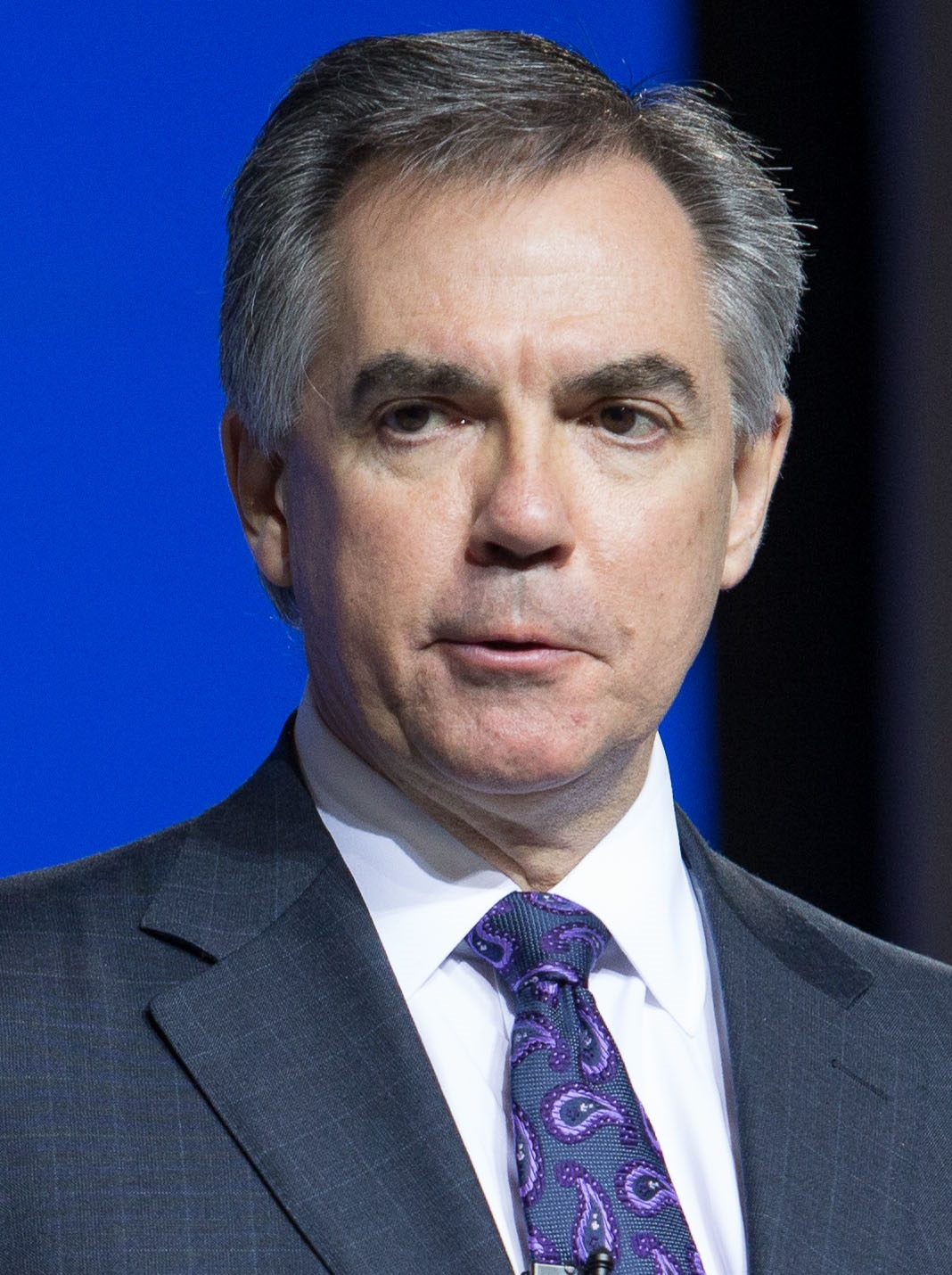

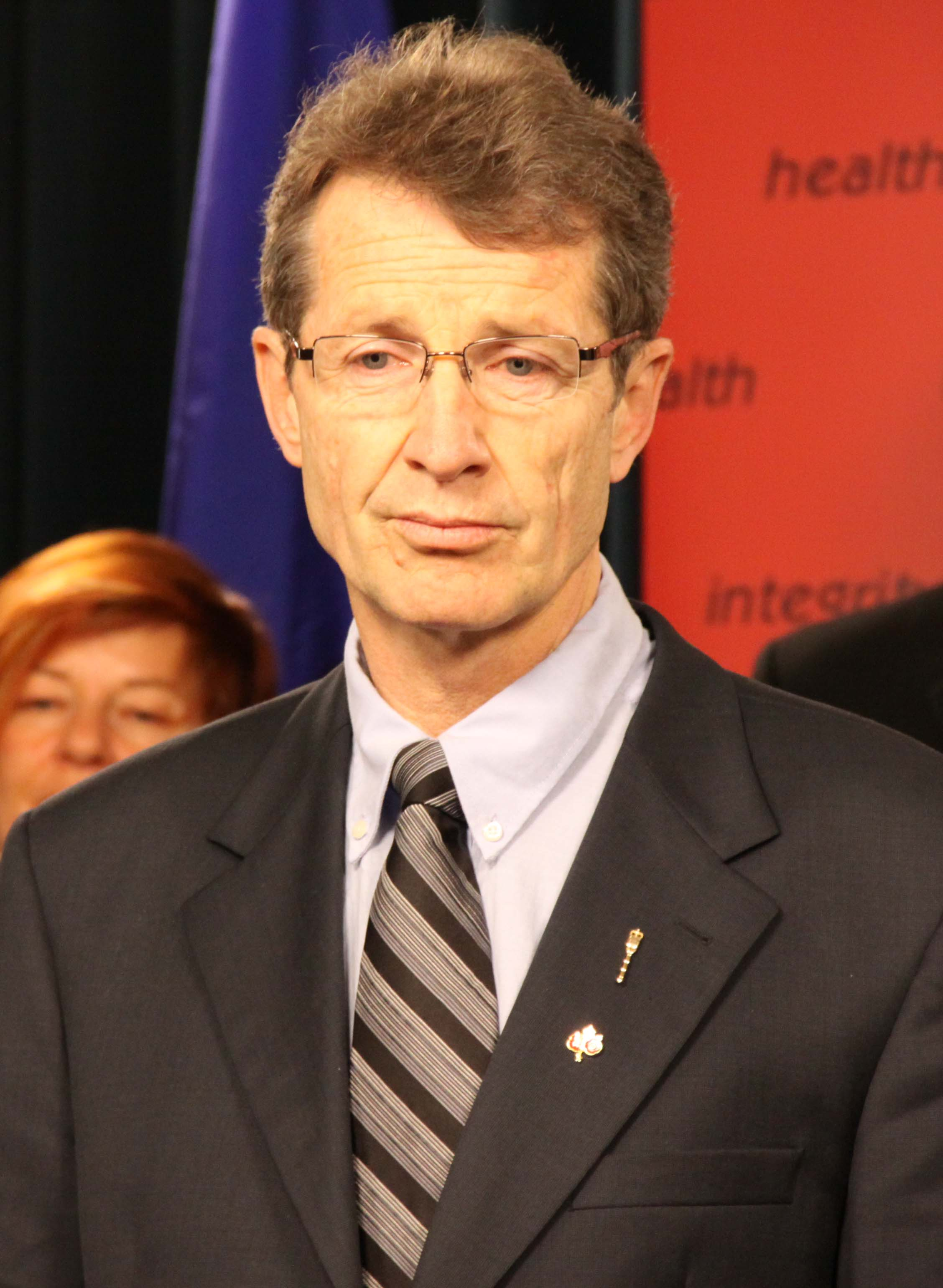

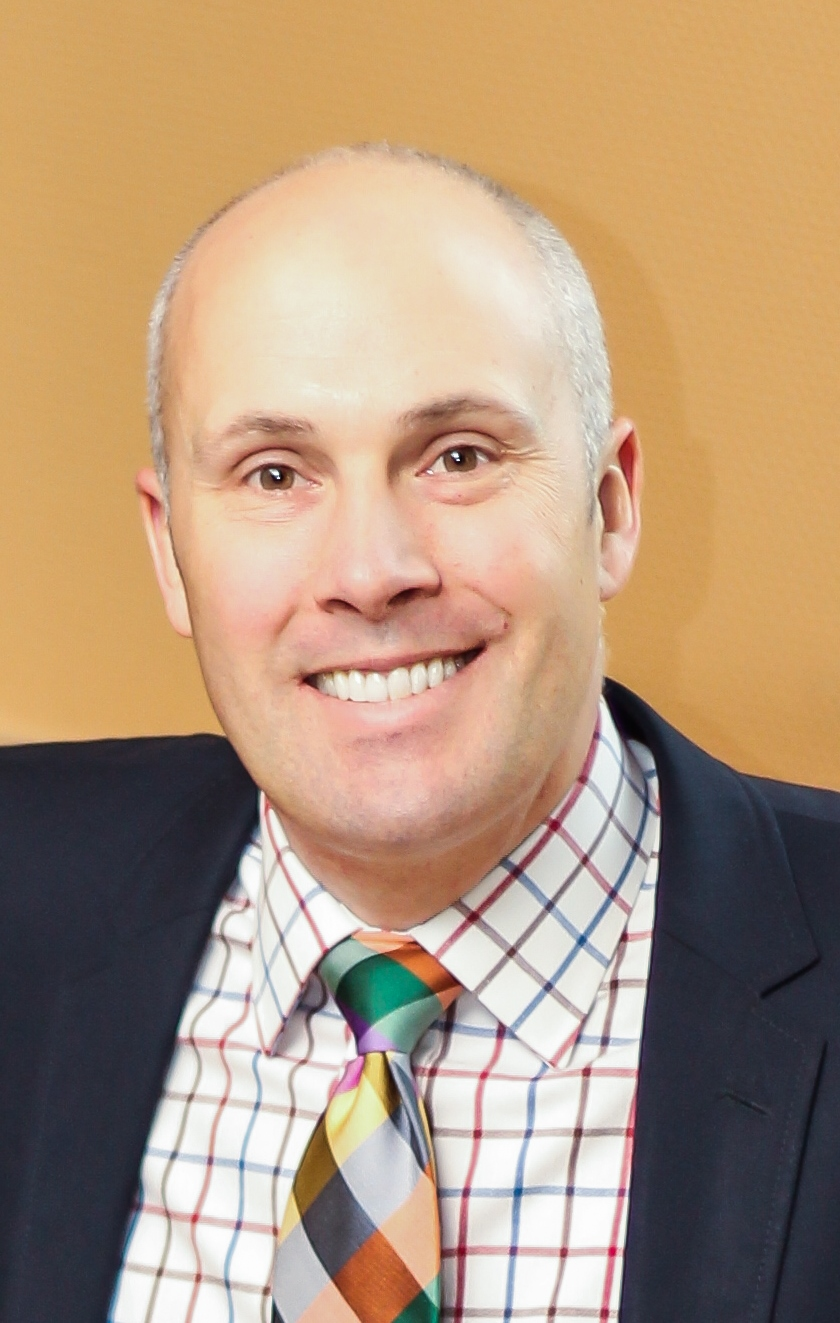
	First party	Second party	Third party
Leader	Rachel Notley	Brian Jean	Jim Prentice
Party	New Democratic	Wildrose	Progressive Conservative
Leader since	October 18, 2014	March 28, 2015	September 6, 2014
Leader's seat	Edmonton-Strathcona	Fort McMurray-Conklin	Calgary-Foothills (disclaimed re-election)
Last election	4 seats, 9.85%	17 seats, 34.28%	61 seats, 43.97%
Seats before	4	5	70
Seats won	54	21	9 (Note: The Progressive Conservative Association won a plurality of votes in 10 ridings. However, Jim Prentice disclaimed his victory in Calgary-Foothills, voiding the election and leaving the Progressive Conservatives with 9 seats in the official results. The riding was subsequently won by the Wildrose Party in a by-election.)
Seat change	▲50	▲16	▼61
Popular vote	604,518	360,511	413,610 (Note: Includes votes from the voided election in the riding of Calgary-Foothills)
Percentage	40.62%	24.22%	27.79%
Swing	▲30.77pp	▼10.06pp	▼16.17pp
	Fourth party	Fifth party
Leader	David Swann	Greg Clark
Party	Liberal	Alberta Party
Leader since	February 1, 2015	September 21, 2013
Leader's seat	Calgary-Mountain View	Calgary-Elbow
Last election	5 seats, 9.89%	0 seats, 1.31%
Seats before	5	0
Seats won	1	1
Seat change	▼4	▲1
Popular vote	62,153	33,221
Percentage	4.18%	2.23%
Swing	▼5.71pp	▲0.92pp
- Popular vote by riding. As this is a first-past-the-post election, seat totals are not determined by total popular vote, but instead by results in each riding. Riding names are listed at the bottom.
Premier before election
Jim Prentice
Progressive Conservative
Premier after election
Rachel Notley
New Democratic

The 2015 Alberta general election was held on May 5, following a request of Premier Jim Prentice to the Lieutenant Governor of Alberta Donald Ethell to dissolve the Legislative Assembly on April 7. This election elected members to the 29th Alberta Legislature. It was only the fourth time in provincial history that saw a change of governing party, and was the last provincial election for both the Alberta Progressive Conservative and Wildrose parties, which merged in 2017 to form the United Conservative Party (although each ran a token candidate in the 2019 election).

The provincial Election Act fixed the election date to a three-month period between March 1 and May 31 in the fourth calendar year after the preceding election day – in this case, April 23, 2012. However, the act does not affect the powers of the Lieutenant Governor to dissolve the Legislature before this period.

As a result of the election, the Alberta New Democratic Party (NDP) were elected to a majority government under leader Rachel Notley. The NDP formed government for the first time in Alberta history since the NDP's founding in the early 1960s.

The 2015 election is sometimes called the "Orange Chinook", a reference to the province's dramatic swing to the NDP, the NDP's orange colour and the weather shifts occasioned by strong Chinook winds that southern Alberta commonly experiences.

The NDP win ousted the PCs, who were reduced to third place in seats. Prentice resigned as PC leader and MLA for Calgary-Foothills on election night.

The Progressive Conservatives (PCs) had a majority in the outgoing Assembly and had won every provincial election since the 1971 election, making them the longest-serving provincial government in Canadian history – being in office for 44 years. This was only the fourth change of governing party in Alberta since becoming a province in 1905, and one of the worst defeats a provincial government has suffered in Canada. 31 PC MLAs lost re-election to the legislature, the largest number in one election in Alberta history. It also marked the first time in almost 80 years that a left-of-centre political party had formed government in Alberta since the defeat of the United Farmers of Alberta in 1935 and the Depression-era radical monetary reform policies of William Aberhart's Social Credit government.

The Wildrose Party under leader Brian Jean remained the Official Opposition, gaining four seats since 2012 despite winning 81,814 fewer votes and a 10.1% lower share of the popular vote than in the previous election. The Alberta Liberal Party and Alberta Party each won a single seat with Alberta Party leader Greg Clark becoming the party's first MLA. The Alberta Liberal Party lost four seats, only returning interim leader David Swann to the Legislative Assembly.

After the Calgary-Glenmore seat was allocated through a recount, 28 women were elected in this election.

Following the election, Notley and her cabinet were sworn in on May 24.

Overall, across the province, 1,488,248 valid votes were cast in this election.

== Background ==
In the 2012 general election the PCs lost a portion of their caucus, but were able to continue as majority government, despite their share of the popular vote decreasing to under 50%. The Wildrose Party formed the official opposition for the first time, while the other two parties in the Assembly, the Alberta Liberal Party and Alberta New Democratic Party (NDP), both held official party status with five and four seats respectively. On September 4, 2014, the PCs became the longest serving political dynasty in Canadian history, at 43 years, 5 days.

Prentice, who succeeded former premier and interim leader of the Progressive Conservatives Dave Hancock in September 2014, was not obligated to call an election until 2016. However, seeking a new mandate to pass his budget, he asked Lieutenant Governor Donald Ethell to dissolve the legislature on April 7. In accordance with Canadian constitutional practice, Ethell granted the request, beginning a month long campaign. The early election call was criticized by some as unethical, as it violated the fixed election dates specified in the Elections Act, but it was constitutionally valid and followed the general practice of the reserve powers of the Crown, specifically the constitutional convention of following the advice of the premier.

== Results ==
The NDP received the most votes (more votes than any other party) overall and in 54 districts (more than half the districts), though did not receive a majority of the vote overall nor in many districts. It received 40.6 per cent of the vote and captured 62 per cent of the seats in the Legislature.

Due to First-past-the-post voting, the NDP swept the Edmonton seats, won a majority of the seats in Calgary and just less than half of seats in rural Alberta. NDP MLAs were elected in all 21 Edmonton districts, 15 of the 26 Calgary districts and 18 of the 40 districts outside the major cities.

NDP candidates received over 50% of the votes in each Edmonton riding as well as the ridings of Sherwood Park, St. Albert and Lethbridge-West. All opposition (non-NDP) candidates received less than half the votes in the riding where they ran, except for the Wildrose candidates in Cypress-Medicine Hat, Strathmore-Brooks and Olds-Disbury, each of whom captured a majority of the district votes.

The election produced some very close races and small leads for some winning candidates. In Calgary Glenmore the winning candidate won with a lead of six votes over her leading contender. In Calgary McCall an NDP candidate won with less than 30 per cent of the vote; in Calgary Shaw an NDP candidate won with but 31 per cent of the vote; in Calgary South-East a PC won with only 32.5 per cent of the votes cast.

In many ridings the combined votes of the Progressive Conservative and the Wildrose candidates surpassed that of the NDP.

In some ridings such as Red Deer North, Spruce Grove-St. Albert, Calgary-Buffalo, Calgary-Varsity, Lethbridge East and Lethbridge West, the combined vote of the NDP and the Liberal candidates totalled more than 50 per cent of the district's votes, thus overwhelming the combined vote of the Conservative and Wild Rose candidate. This also held true for Calgary Mountain View where a Liberal was elected.

In many ridings no Liberal ran, which probably aided the NDP victory in those ridings. These included Lesser Slave Lake, Peace River, Edmonton-McClung, Sherwood Park, West Yellowhead and Whitecourt.

Party	Votes			Seats
New Democratic	604,518	40.6%	▲30.8pp	54 / 87 (62%)
Progressive Conservative	413,610	27.8%	▼16.2pp	9 / 87 (10%)
Wildrose	360,511	24.2%	▼10.1pp	21 / 87 (24%)
Liberal	62,153	4.2%	▼5.7pp	1 / 87 (1%)
Alberta Party	33,221	2.2%	▲0.9pp	1 / 87 (1%)

Popular vote
New Democratic	40.62%
PC	27.79%
Wildrose	24.22%
Liberal	4.18%
Alberta Party	2.23%
Others	0.96%

Seats
New Democratic	62.07%
Wildrose	24.14%
PC	11.49%
Liberal	1.15%
Alberta Party	1.15%

Summary of the May 5, 2015 Legislative Assembly of Alberta election results
Party	Party leader	Number of candidates	Seats				Popular vote*		
Party	Party leader	Number of candidates	2012	Dissol.	2015	% of Seats	#	%	Change (pp)
New Democratic	Rachel Notley	87	4	4	54	62.1	604,518	40.62	+30.77
Wildrose	Brian Jean	86	17	5	21	24.1	360,511	24.22	–10.06
Progressive Conservative	Jim Prentice	87	61	70	9	10.3	413,610	27.79	–16.17
Liberal	David Swann	56	5	5	1	1.1	62,153	4.18	–5.71
Alberta Party	Greg Clark	36	—	—	1	1.1	33,221	2.23	+0.92
Green	Janet Keeping	24	—	—	—	—	7,215	0.48	+0.09
Social Credit	Len Skowronski	6	—	—	—	—	834	0.06	+0.03
Communist	Naomi Rankin	2	—	—	—	—	182	0.01	=
Alberta First	Bart Hampton	1	—	—	—	—	72	0.005	=
Independent		15	—	1	—	—	5,932	0.40	+0.13
Vacant				2	1**	1.1			
Total		400	87	87	87	100.0%	1,488,248	100.00%	

* The total popular vote includes votes from voided Calgary-Foothills election.
** Incumbent Premier Jim Prentice disclaimed his victory in Calgary-Foothills. According to section 139 of the Alberta Elections Act, if a winning candidate disclaims their right to become an MLA before the end of the appeal period for the official results, that riding's election is declared void.

Elections to the Legislative Assembly of Alberta – seats won/lost by party, 2012–2015
Party	2012	Gain from (loss to)							2015
Party	2012	NDP	WR		PC		Lib	Alb	2015
New Democratic	4		2		44		4		54
Wildrose	17	(2)			7	(1)			21
Progressive Conservative	61	(44)	1	(7)				(1)	9
Liberal	5	(4)							1
Alberta Party	0				1				1
Total	87	(50)	3	(7)	52	(1)	4	(1)	86

The election resulted in a majority government led by the New Democratic Party.

The result in Calgary-Glenmore remained unresolved on election night, as incumbent PC MLA Linda Johnson and NDP challenger Anam Kazim finished the vote count in an exact tie of 7,015 votes each, necessitating a recount process. On May 15, the recount determined NDP candidate Anam Kazim won the riding by six votes.

The Alberta NDP had been leading in most polls since late April. They had been expected to do well in Edmonton, which historically had been more favourable to centre-left parties and candidates than Alberta in general. However, in a result that exceeded even the most optimistic projections for the NDP, Edmonton swung dramatically to support Notley, who represents an Edmonton riding. The NDP took every seat in the city, all by very large margins (4,000 votes or more with absolute majority support). The NDP also won 15 of the 25 seats in Calgary, the power base of the PCs for most of the previous four decades. The NDP also swept the province's third and fourth-largest cities, Lethbridge and Red Deer. NDP support remained relatively lower in rural Alberta, where they won only a handful of ridings in the north of the province, as well as some rural ridings around Edmonton.

Notley later said that she had known a week before the election that the NDP would win. She told the Canadian Press that she had been sitting in a hotel room in either Calgary or Lethbridge when she saw a very credible poll showing the NDP was poised to rebound from a mere four seats in the legislature – the minimum for official party status – to an outright majority. She was stunned at first, but recovered long enough to drop her plans for a whirlwind schedule to close out the campaign. Her original plan would have not only resulted in her looking extremely haggard in her first speech as premier-elect, but would have left her without time to begin a transition.

The PCs finished second in the popular vote, 53,099 votes ahead of the Wildrose. However, their caucus was decimated due to a near-total collapse in the major cities, as well as a more pronounced split in the right-of-centre vote. They were completely shut out in Edmonton, Lethbridge, and Red Deer, and lost 12 of their 20 seats in Calgary. Since the first-past-the-post system awards seats solely on the basis of plurality district contests (not by proportional representation), the PCs were knocked down to third place with 10 seats, and only two outside Calgary. This was further reduced to nine when Prentice disclaimed victory in his riding. The PCs were reduced to their smallest presence in the Legislative Assembly since 1967. With a few exceptions, their support in the cities transferred to the NDP, while their rural support moved to the Wildrose. All but three members of Prentice's cabinet were defeated.

The Wildrose had its legislative caucus greatly reduced in 2014 when then-leader and Leader of the Official Opposition Danielle Smith and all but 5 Wildrose MLAs crossed the floor to sit with the governing PCs. In the 2015 general election, the party rebounded to 21 seats and retained Official Opposition status. All of their gains were in rural ridings taken from the PCs, and they failed to win a seat in Edmonton or Calgary.

Greg Clark, leader of the Alberta Party, won the first ever seat for his party in the Legislative Assembly. He won the seat of Calgary-Elbow.

For the first time the NDP won a majority of seats in Calgary, taking 15 of the city's 26 seats. This centre-left success was deepened by a Liberal candidate and an Alberta Party candidate also scoring wins in that city. Such had not happened since 1921, when Labour candidates and Independents took seats there.

== Results by riding ==
Bold indicates cabinet members, and party leaders are italicized. Candidate names appear as they appeared on the ballot.

Colour band in gulley indictes winner of the election.

All results are sourced from Elections Alberta.

=== Northern Alberta ===
Electoral district	Candidates						Incumbent
Electoral district	PC	Wildrose	Liberal	NDP	Alberta Party	Other	Incumbent
Athabasca-Sturgeon-Redwater	**Jeff Johnson**; 5,016 - 29.9%	Travis Olson; 4,973 - 29.6%		Colin Piquette; 6,797 - 40.5%			**Jeff Johnson**
Barrhead-Morinville-Westlock	**Maureen Kubinec**; 4,876 - 26.6%	Glenn van Dijken; 7,206 - 39.3%		Tristan Turner; 6,232 - 34.0%			**Maureen Kubinec**
Bonnyville-Cold Lake	Craig Copeland; 3,594 - 30.4%	Scott Cyr; 5,452 - 46.2%		Josalyne Head; 2,136 - 18.1%	Rob Fox; 628 - 5.3%		Genia Leskiw†
Dunvegan-Central Peace-Notley	Rhonda Clarke-Gauthier; 2,766 - 28.8%	Kelly Hudson; 3,147 - 32.8%		Margaret McCuaig-Boyd; 3,692 - 38.4%			Hector Goudreau†
Fort McMurray-Conklin	**Don Scott**; 1,502 - 22.3%	Brian Jean; 2,950 - 43.9%	Melinda Hollis; 204 - 3.0%	Ariana Mancini; 2,071 - 30.8%			**Don Scott**
Fort McMurray-Wood Buffalo	Mike Allen; 2,486 - 25.9%	Tany Yao; 3,835 - 40.0%	Robin Le Fevre; 345 - 3.6%	Stephen Drover; 2,915 - 30.4%			Mike Allen
Grande Prairie-Smoky	Everett McDonald; 4,968 - 30.8%	Todd Loewen; 5,343 - 33.2%	Kevin McLean; 787 - 4.9%	Todd Russell; 5,009 - 31.1%			Everett McDonald
Grande Prairie-Wapiti	**Wayne Drysdale**; 6,229 - 35.6%	Laila Goodridge; 4,175 - 23.8%		Mary Dahr; 5,062 - 28.9%	Rory Tarant; 2,048 - 11.7%		**Wayne Drysdale**
Lac La Biche-St. Paul-Two Hills	Darrell Younghans; 3,004 - 24.4%	David Hanson; 4,763 - 38.7%		Catherine Harder; 4,214 - 34.2%		Brian Deheer (Green); 339 - 2.8%	Shayne Saskiw†
Lesser Slave Lake	Pearl Calahasen; 1,944 - 21.5%	Darryl Boisson; 3,198 - 35.3%		Danielle Larivee; 3,915 - 43.2%			Pearl Calahasen
Peace River	**Frank Oberle**; 3,529 - 36.4%	Nathan Steinke; 1,979 - 20.4%		Debbie Jabbour; 3,821 - 39.4%	Sherry Hilton; 376 - 3.9%		**Frank Oberle**

=== Central Edmonton ===
Electoral district	Candidates						Incumbent
Electoral district	PC	Wildrose	Liberal	NDP	Alberta Party	Other	Incumbent
Edmonton-Beverly-Clareview	Tony Caterina; 2,524 - 15.5%	Stephanie Diacon; 1,248 - 7.6%	Tomi Yellowface; 359 - 2.2%	Deron Bilous; 12,049 - 73.8%	Owais Siddiqui; 147 - 0.9%		Deron Bilous
Edmonton-Calder	Thomas "Tom" Bradley; 3,222 - 17.8%	Andrew Altimas; 1,565 - 8.6%	Amit "Sunny" Batra; 527 - 2.9%	David Eggen; 12,837 - 70.7%			David Eggen
Edmonton-Centre	Catherine Keill; 2,228 - 13.5%	Joe Byram; 772 - 4.7%	Laurie Blakeman (Note: Blakeman was also endorsed by the Alberta Party and the Green Party of Alberta.); 4,199 - 25.4%	David Shepherd; 8,983 - 54.4%		Greg Keating (Ind.); 295 - 1.8% Rory Joe Koopmans (Ind.); 40 - 0.2%	Laurie Blakeman
Edmonton-Glenora	**Heather Klimchuk**; 3,145 - 17.3%	Don Koziak; 1,394 - 7.6%	Karen Sevcik; 553 - 3.0%	Sarah Hoffman; 12,473 - 68.4%	Chris Vilcsak; 463 - 2.5%	David Parker (Green); 195 - 1.1%	**Heather Klimchuk**
Edmonton-Gold Bar	David Dorward; 4,147 - 18.6%	Justin J. James; 1,422 - 6.4%	Ronald Brochu; 702 - 3.2%	Marlin Schmidt; 15,349 - 68.9%	Cristina Stasia; 662 - 3.0%		David Dorward
Edmonton-Highlands-Norwood	Jonathan Weiqun Dai; 1,778 - 12.0%	Joshua Loeppky; 967 - 6.5%	Matthew R. Smith; 494 - 3.3%	Brian Mason; 11,555 - 78.1%			Brian Mason
Edmonton-Mill Creek	Gene Zwozdesky; 3,848 - 23.9%	Saqib Raja; 1,365 - 8.5%	Harpreet Gill; 1,896 - 11.8%	Denise Woollard; 9,025 - 55.9%			Gene Zwozdesky
Edmonton-Mill Woods	Sohail Quadri; 2,920 - 19.1%	Baljit Sall; 1,437 - 9.4%	Roberto Maglalang; 850 - 5.6%	Christina Gray; 9,930 - 64.9%		Aura Leddy (Ind.); 129 - 0.8% Naomi Rankin (Communist); 44 - 0.3%	Sohail Quadri
Edmonton-Riverview	Steve Young; 3,732 - 19.3%	Ian Crawford; 1,350 - 7.0%	Donna Wilson; 1,416 - 7.3%	Lori Sigurdson; 12,108 - 62.8%	Brandon Beringer; 487 - 2.5%	Sandra Wolf Lange (Green); 135 - 0.7% Glenn Miller (Ind.); 59 - 0.3%	Steve Young
Edmonton-Rutherford	Chris LaBossiere; 3,940 - 22.5%	Josef Pisa; 1,644 - 9.4%	Michael Chan; 741 - 4.2%	Richard Feehan; 11,214 - 63.9%			Fred Horne†
Edmonton-Strathcona	Shelley Wegner; 2,242 - 13.6%		Steve Kochan; 658 - 4.0%	Rachel Notley; 13,592 - 82.4%			Rachel Notley

=== Suburban Edmonton ===
Electoral district	Candidates						Incumbent
Electoral district	PC	Wildrose	Liberal	NDP	Alberta Party	Other	Incumbent
Edmonton-Castle Downs	Thomas Lukaszuk; 4,182 - 23.1%	Gerrit Roosenboom; 1,383 - 7.6%	Todd Ross; 880 - 4.9%	Nicole Goehring; 11,689 - 64.5%			Thomas Lukaszuk
Edmonton-Decore	Janice Sarich; 2,847 - 18.4%	Dean R. Miller; 1,289 - 8.3%	Bradley Lawrence Whalen; 691 - 4.5%	Chris Nielsen; 10,531 - 67.9%		Trey Capnerhurst (Green); 150 - 1.0%	Janice Sarich
Edmonton-Ellerslie	Harman Kandola; 3,549 - 19.8%	Jackie Lovely; 2,499 - 13.9%	Mike McGowan; 839 - 4.7%	Rod Loyola; 11,034 - 61.6%			**Naresh Bhardwaj**§
Edmonton-Manning	Gurcharan Garcha; 2,599 - 15.1%	Atiq Rehman; 1,475 - 8.6%	Adam Mounzer; 776 - 4.5%	Heather Sweet; 12,376 - 71.8%			Peter Sandhu§
Edmonton-McClung	David Xiao; 4,408 - 25.9%	Steve Thompson; 2,373 - 14.0%		Lorne Dach; 9,412 - 55.4%	John Hudson; 808 - 4.8%		David Xiao
Edmonton-Meadowlark	Katherine O'Neill; 3,924 - 22.8%	Amber Maze; 1,972 - 11.5%	Dan Bildhauer; 1,507 - 8.8%	Jon Carson; 9,796 - 57.0%			Raj Sherman†
Edmonton-South West	Matt Jeneroux; 6,316 - 27.8%	Cole Kander; 2,290 - 10.1%	Rudy Arcilla; 1,199 - 5.3%	Thomas Dang; 12,352 - 54.4%	Krishna Tailor; 543 - 2.4%		Matt Jeneroux
Edmonton-Whitemud	**Stephen Mandel**; 7,177 - 32.2%	Chad Peters; 1,423 - 6.4%	Steven Townsend; 629 - 2.8%	Bob Turner; 12,805 - 57.4%		Kathryn Jackson (Green); 182 - 0.8% John Baloun (Ind.); 73 - 0.3%	**Stephen Mandel**
Sherwood Park	Cathy Olesen; 5,655 - 25.9%	Linda Osinchuk; 4,815 - 22.1%		Annie McKitrick; 11,365 - 52.0%			Cathy Olesen
St. Albert	**Stephen Khan**; 6,340 - 27.9%	Shelley Biermanski; 2,858 - 12.6%	Bill Alton; 778 - 3.4%	Marie Renaud; 12,220 - 53.9%	Trevor Love; 493 - 2.2%		**Stephen Khan**

=== West Central Alberta ===
Electoral district	Candidates						Incumbent
Electoral district	PC	Wildrose	Liberal	NDP	Alberta Party	Other	Incumbent
Drayton Valley-Devon	**Diana J. McQueen**; 5,182 - 30.5%	Mark Smith; 6,284 - 37.0%		Katherine Swampy; 4,816 - 28.4%	Connie Jensen; 416 - 2.5%	Jennifer R. Roach (Green); 276 - 1.6%	**Diana McQueen**
Innisfail-Sylvan Lake	Kerry Towle; 5,136 - 28.0%	Don MacIntyre; 7,829 - 42.7%		Patricia Norman; 4,244 - 23.1%	Danielle Klooster; 1,135 - 6.2%		Kerry Towle
Olds-Didsbury-Three Hills	Wade Bearchell; 5,274 - 26.3%	Nathan Cooper; 10,692 - 53.4%		Glenn R. Norman; 3,366 - 16.8%	Jim Adamchick; 685 - 3.4%		Bruce Rowe†
Red Deer-North	Christine Moore; 3,836 - 22.7%	S.H. "Buck" Buchanan; 4,173 - 24.7%	Michael Dawe (Note: Dawe was also endorsed by the Green Party of Alberta.); 3,262 - 19.3%	Kim Schreiner; 4,969 - 29.4%	Krystal Kromm; 683 - 4.0%		Mary Anne Jablonski†
Red Deer-South	Darcy Mykytyshyn; 5,414 - 27.6%	Norman Wiebe; 4,812 - 24.6%	Deborah Checkel; 738 - 3.8%	Barb Miller; 7,024 - 35.9%	Serge Gingras; 1,035 - 5.3%	Ben Dubois (Green); 274 - 1.4% Patti Argent (Ind.); 232 - 1.2% William Berry (Ind.); 60 - 0.3%	Cal Dallas†
Rimbey-Rocky Mountain House-Sundre	Tammy Coté; 5,296 - 31.8%	Jason Nixon; 6,670 - 40.1%		Hannah Schlamp; 2,791 - 16.8%		Joe Anglin (Ind.); 1,871 - 11.3%	Joe Anglin
Spruce Grove-St. Albert	Rus Matichuk; 6,362 - 25.6%	Jaye Walter; 4,631 - 18.7%	Reg Lukasik; 916 - 3.7%	Vivienne Horne (Canadian politician); 11,546 - 46.5%	Gary Hanna; 1,081 - 4.4%	Brendon Greene (Green); 269 - 1.1%	Vacant
Stony Plain	Ken Lemke; 4,944 - 25.7%	Kathy Rondeau; 5,586 - 29.1%	Mike Hanlon; 657 - 3.4%	Erin Babcock; 7,268 - 37.8%	Sandy Simmie; 538 - 2.8%	Matt Burnett (Green); 220 - 1.1%	Ken Lemke
West Yellowhead	**Robin Campbell**; 3,433 - 32.3%	Stuart Taylor; 3,055 - 28.8%		Eric Rosendahl; 4,135 - 38.9%			**Robin Campbell**
Whitecourt-Ste. Anne	George VanderBurg; 4,721 - 31.1%	John Bos; 4,996 - 33.0%		Oneil Carlier; 5,442 - 35.9%			George VanderBurg

=== East Central Alberta ===
Electoral district	Candidates						Incumbent
Electoral district	PC	Wildrose	Liberal	NDP	Alberta Party	Other	Incumbent
Battle River-Wainwright	Blake Prior; 5,057 - 31.2%	Wes Taylor; 6,862 - 42.3%	Ron Williams; 500 - 3.1%	Gordon Naylor; 3,807 - 23.5%			Vacant
Drumheller-Stettler	Jack Hayden; 5,388 - 33.9%	Rick Strankman; 7,570 - 47.7%		Emily Shannon; 2,927 - 18.4%			Rick Strankman
Fort Saskatchewan-Vegreville	Jacquie Fenske; 5,527 - 28.3%	Joe Gosselin; 3,959 - 20.2%	Peter Schneider; 475 - 2.4%	Jessica Littlewood; 8,983 - 45.9%	Derek Christensen; 324 - 1.7%	Allison Anderson (Green); 285 - 1.5%	Jacquie Fenske
Lacombe-Ponoka	Peter Dewit; 5,018 - 27.6%	Ron Orr; 6,502 - 35.7%		Doug Hart; 5,481 - 30.1%	Tony Jeglum; 1,206 - 6.6%		Rod Fox§
Leduc-Beaumont	George Rogers; 6,225 - 28.3%	Sharon Smith; 6,543 - 29.7%		Shaye Anderson; 8,321 - 37.8%	Bert Hoogewoonink; 612 - 2.8%	Josh Drozda (Green); 301 - 1.4%	George Rogers
Strathcona-Sherwood Park	Dave Quest; 6,623 - 30.1%	Rob Johnson; 5,286 - 24.0%		Estefania Cortes-Vargas; 9,376 - 42.6%	Lynne Kaiser; 721 - 3.3%		Dave Quest
Vermilion-Lloydminster	Richard Starke; 5,935 - 47.4%	Danny Hozack; 4,171 - 33.3%		Saba Mossagizi; 2,428 - 19.4%			Richard Starke
Wetaskiwin-Camrose	**Verlyn Olson**; 5,951 - 34.7%	Bill Rock; 3,685 - 21.5%		Bruce Hinkley; 7,531 - 43.9%			**Verlyn Olson**

=== Central Calgary ===
Electoral district	Candidates						Incumbent
Electoral district	PC	Wildrose	Liberal	NDP	Alberta Party	Other	Incumbent
Calgary-Acadia	**Jonathan Denis**; 4,602 - 29.0%	Linda Carlson; 4,985 - 31.4%	Nicholas Borovsky; 765 - 4.8%	Brandy Payne; 5,506 - 34.7%			**Jonathan Denis**
Calgary-Buffalo	Terry Rock; 3,738 - 28.1%	Leah Wamboldt; 1,351 - 10.2%	David Khan; 3,282 - 24.7%	Kathleen Ganley; 4,671 - 35.1%		Sabrina Lee Levac (Green); 263 - 2.0%	Kent Hehr†
Calgary-Cross	Rick Hanson; 4,501 - 35.3%	Moiz Mahmood; 2,060 - 16.2%	Manjot Singh Gill; 1,194 - 9.4%	Ricardo Miranda; 4,602 - 36.1%		Peter Meic (Green); 236 - 1.9% Katherine Le Rougetel (Ind.); 143 - 1.1%	Yvonne Fritz†
Calgary-Currie	Christine Cusanelli; 4,577 - 24.7%	Terry DeVries; 3,769 - 20.3%	Shelley Wark-Martyn; 1,441 - 7.8%	Brian Malkinson; 7,387 - 39.8%	Tony Norman; 1,006 - 5.4%	Nelson Berlin (Green); 373 - 2.0%	Christine Cusanelli
Calgary-East	Moe Amery; 3,971 - 28.3%	Ali Waissi; 3,633 - 25.9%	Naser Al-Kukhun; 806 - 5.7%	Robyn Luff; 5,506 - 39.2%		Bonnie Devine (Communist); 138 - 1.0%	Moe Amery
Calgary-Elbow	**Gordon Dirks**; 6,254 - 30.3%	Megan Brown; 1,786 - 8.7%	John Roggeveen; 565 - 2.7%	Catherine Welburn; 3,256 - 15.8%	Greg Clark; 8,707 - 42.2%	Larry R. Heather (Social Credit); 67 - 0.3%	**Gordon Dirks**
Calgary-Fish Creek	Richard Gotfried; 6,198 - 32.9%	Blaine Maller; 5,568 - 29.6%		Jill Moreton; 6,069 - 32.2%	Allison Wemyss; 850 - 4.5%	Martin Owen (Social Credit); 148 - 0.8%	Heather Forsyth†
Calgary-Fort	Andy Bao Nguyen; 3,204 - 22.7%	Jeevan Mangat; 3,003 - 21.3%	Said Abdulbaki; 476 - 3.4%	Joe Ceci; 7,027 - 49.8%	Vic Goosen; 410 - 2.9%		Wayne Cao†
Calgary-Glenmore	Linda Johnson; 7,015 - 33.2%	Chris Kemp-Jackson; 5,058 - 23.9%	David Waddington; 1,345 - 6.4%	Anam Kazim; 7,021 - 33.2%	Terry Lo; 719 - 3.4%		Linda Johnson
Calgary-Klein	Kyle Fawcett; 4,878 - 26.8%	Jeremy Nixon; 4,206 - 23.0%	David Gamble; 1,104 - 6.0%	Craig Coolahan; 8,098 - 44.3%		Noel Keough (Note: Withdrew.) (Green); 0 - 0.0%	Kyle Fawcett
Calgary-Mountain View	Mark Hlady; 4,699 - 23.9%	Terry Wong; 2,070 - 10.5%	David Swann; 7,204 - 36.7%	Marc Andrew Chikinda; 5,673 - 28.9%			David Swann
Calgary-Varsity	Susan Billington; 5,700 - 30.2%	Sharon Polsky; 2,598 - 13.8%	Pete Helfrich; 1,862 - 9.9%	Stephanie McLean; 8,297 - 43.9%		Carl Svoboda (Green); 424 - 2.2%	Donna Kennedy-Glans†

=== Suburban Calgary ===
Electoral district	Candidates						Incumbent
Electoral district	PC	Wildrose	Liberal	NDP	Alberta Party	Other	Incumbent
Calgary-Bow	Byron Nelson; 5,419 - 33.0%	Trevor Grover; 3,752 - 22.8%	Matt Gaiser; 682 - 4.2%	Deborah Drever; 5,669 - 34.5%	Jonathon Himann; 459 - 2.8%	David Reid (Green); 448 - 2.7%	Alana DeLong†
Calgary-Foothills	**Jim Prentice** (Note: Prentice disclaimed his victory on election night, leaving the seat vacant.); 7,163 - 40.3%	Keelan Frey; 3,216 - 18.1%	Ali Bin Zahid; 1,271 - 7.2%	Anne Wilson; 5,748 - 32.4%		Janet Keeping (Green); 363 - 2.0%	**Jim Prentice**
Calgary-Greenway	**Manmeet Bhullar**; 5,337 - 42.8%	Devinder Toor; 2,627 - 21.1%		Don Monroe; 4,513 - 36.2%			**Manmeet Bhullar**
Calgary-Hawkwood	Jason Luan; 6,378 - 31.2%	Jae Shim; 4,448 - 21.7%	Harbaksh Singh Sekhon; 736 - 3.6%	Michael Connolly; 7,443 - 36.4%	Beth Barberree; 925 - 4.5%	Polly Knowlton Cockett (Green); 455 - 2.2% Len Skowronski (Social Credit); 90 - 0.4%	Jason Luan
Calgary-Hays	**Ric McIver**; 6,671 - 38.3%	Bob Mailloux; 4,562 - 26.2%	Shawn Emran; 722 - 4.1%	Carla Drader; 5,138 - 29.5%		Graham MacKenzie (Green); 250 - 1.4% Zachary Doyle (Social Credit); 93 - 0.5%	**Ric McIver**
Calgary-Lougheed	Dave Rodney; 5,939 - 35.0%	Mark Mantei; 4,781 - 28.2%	Leila Keith; 817 - 4.8%	Mihai Ion; 5,437 - 32.0%			Dave Rodney
Calgary-Mackay-Nose Hill	Neil Brown; 4,587 - 27.4%	Kathy Macdonald; 4,914 - 29.3%	Prab Lashar; 768 - 4.6%	Karen M. McPherson; 6,177 - 36.9%		Sandy Kevin Aberdeen (Green); 316 - 1.9%	Neil Brown
Calgary-McCall	Jagdeep Kaur Sahota; 2,317 - 18.2%	Happy Mann; 3,367 - 26.4%	Avinash S. Khangura; 2,224 - 17.5%	Irfan Sabir; 3,812 - 29.9%		Burhan Khan (Ind.); 1,010 - 7.9%	Darshan Kang†
Calgary-North West	Sandra Jansen; 6,320 - 32.7%	Jeff Callaway; 5,163 - 26.7%	Neil Marion; 935 - 4.8%	Karen Mills; 5,724 - 29.6%	Chris Blatch; 1,176 - 6.1%		Sandra Jansen
Calgary-Northern Hills	Teresa Woo-Paw; 5,343 - 30.7%	Prasad Panda; 4,392 - 25.3%	Harry Lin; 1,000 - 5.8%	Jamie Kleinsteuber; 6,641 - 38.2%			Teresa Woo-Paw
Calgary-Shaw	Jeff Wilson; 5,348 - 30.7%	Brad Leishman; 5,301 - 30.4%	Alexander Barrow; 668 - 3.8%	Graham Sucha; 5,449 - 31.2%	Evert Smith; 661 - 3.8%		Jeff Wilson
Calgary-South East	Rick Fraser; 7,663 - 32.5%	Brandon Lunty; 6,892 - 29.2%	Gladwin Gill; 1,304 - 5.5%	Mirical Macdonald; 7,358 - 31.2%		Jordan Mac Isaac (Green); 374 - 1.6%	Rick Fraser
Calgary-West	Mike Ellis; 8,312 - 46.8%	Gerard Lucyshyn; 4,512 - 25.4%		Mizanur Rahman; 4,940 - 27.8%			Mike Ellis
Chestermere-Rocky View	Bruce McAllister; 7,454 - 36.0%	Leela Sharon Aheer; 7,676 - 37.0%		William James Pelech; 3,706 - 17.9%		Jamie Lall (Ind.); 1,093 - 5.3% Coral Bliss Taylor (Green); 405 - 2.0% Matt Grant (Ind.); 391 - 1.9%	Bruce McAllister

=== Southern Alberta ===
Electoral district	Candidates						Incumbent
Electoral district	PC	Wildrose	Liberal	NDP	Alberta Party	Other	Incumbent
Airdrie	Peter Brown; 6,181 - 28.9%	Angela Pitt; 7,499 - 35.1%		Chris Noble; 6,388 - 29.9%	Jeremy Klug; 912 - 4.3%	Jeff Willerton (Ind.); 399 - 1.9%	Rob Anderson†
Banff-Cochrane	Ron Casey; 5,555 - 28.2%	Scott Wagner; 5,692 - 28.9%		Cameron Westhead; 8,426 - 42.8%			Ron Casey
Cardston-Taber-Warner	Brian Brewin; 4,356 - 35.5%	Grant Hunter; 5,126 - 41.8%		Aaron Haugen; 2,407 - 19.6%	Delbert Bodnarek; 378 - 3.1%		Gary Bikman§
Cypress-Medicine Hat	Bob Olson; 3,389 - 21.6%	Drew Barnes; 8,544 - 54.6%	Eric Musekamp; 528 - 3.4%	Bev Waege; 3,201 - 20.4%			Drew Barnes
Highwood	Carrie Fischer; 6,827 - 33.0%	Wayne Anderson; 8,504 - 41.1%		Leslie Mahoney; 3,937 - 19.0%	Joel Windsor; 892 - 4.3%	Martin Blake (Green); 390 - 1.7% Jeremy Fraser (Social Credit); 187 - 0.9%	Danielle Smith§
Lethbridge-East	Tammy L. Perlich; 4,743 - 25.3%	Kent Prestage; 3,918 - 20.9%	Bill West; 1,201 - 6.4%	Maria Fitzpatrick; 8,918 - 47.5%			Bridget Pastoor†
Lethbridge-West	Greg Weadick; 3,938 - 21.0%	Ron Bain; 3,063 - 16.3%	Sheila Pyne; 634 - 3.4%	Shannon Phillips; 11,144 - 59.3%			Greg Weadick
Little Bow	Ian Donovan; 4,793 - 35.3%	David Schneider; 4,803 - 35.4%	Helen McMenamin; 377 - 2.8%	Bev Muendel-Atherstone; 3,364 - 24.8%		Caleb Van Der Weide (Social Credit); 249 - 1.8%	Ian Donovan
Livingstone-Macleod	Evan P. Berger; 6,404 - 34.7%	Pat Stier; 7,362 - 39.9%	Alida Hess; 464 - 2.5%	Aileen Burke; 4,338 - 22.9%			Pat Stier
Medicine Hat	Blake Pedersen; 3,427 - 21.1%	Val Olson; 5,790 - 35.6%		Bob Wanner; 6,160 - 37.9%	Jim Black; 731 - 4.5%	David Andrew Phillips (Ind.); 137 - 0.8%	Blake Pedersen
Strathmore-Brooks	Molly Douglass; 4,452 - 27.0%	Derek Fildebrandt; 8,652 - 52.5%	Ali Abdulbaki; 200 - 1.2%	Lynn MacWilliam; 2,463 - 15.0%	Einar B. Davison; 304 - 1.8%	Mike Worthington (Green); 322 - 2.0% Glen Dundas (Alberta First); 72 - 0.4%	Jason Hale†

== Defeated incumbents ==
Party	Name	Constituency	Office held at election	Year elected	Defeated by	Party
Progressive; Conservative	Mike Allen	Fort McMurray-Wood Buffalo		2012	Tany Yao	Wildrose Party
Progressive; Conservative	Moe Amery	Calgary East		1993	Robyn Luff	New Democratic Party
Progressive; Conservative	Pearl Calahasen	Lesser Slave Lake	Longest-serving MLA at dissolution	1989	Danielle Larivee	New Democratic Party
Progressive; Conservative	Jonathan Denis	Calgary-Acadia	Minister of Justice and Solicitor General	2008	Brandy Payne	New Democratic Party
Progressive; Conservative	Gordon Dirks	Calgary-Elbow	Minister of Education	2014	Greg Clark	Alberta Party
Progressive; Conservative	Ian Donovan	Little Bow		2012	Dave Schneider	Wildrose Party
Progressive; Conservative	David Dorward	Edmonton-Gold Bar	Associate Minister of Aboriginal Relations	2012	Marlin Schmidt	New Democratic Party
Progressive; Conservative	Jacquie Fenske	Fort Saskatchewan-Vegreville		2012	Jessica Littlewood	New Democratic Party
Progressive; Conservative	Matt Jeneroux	Edmonton-South West		2012	Thomas Dang	New Democratic Party
Progressive; Conservative	Jeff Johnson	Athabasca-Sturgeon-Redwater	Minister of Seniors	2008	Colin Piquette	New Democratic Party
Progressive; Conservative	Linda Johnson	Calgary-Glenmore		2012	Anam Kazim	New Democratic Party
Progressive; Conservative	Stephen Khan	St. Albert	Minister of Service Alberta	2012	Marie Renaud	New Democratic Party
Progressive; Conservative	Heather Klimchuk	Edmonton-Glenora	Minister of Human Services	2008	Sarah Hoffman	New Democratic Party
Progressive; Conservative	Maureen Kubinec	Barrhead-Morinville-Westlock	Minister of Culture and Tourism	2012	Glenn van Dijken	Wildrose Party
Progressive; Conservative	Thomas Lukaszuk	Edmonton-Castle Downs		2001	Nicole Goehring	New Democratic Party
Progressive; Conservative	Stephen Mandel	Edmonton-Whitemud	Minister of Health	2014	Bob Turner	New Democratic Party
Progressive; Conservative	Bruce McAllister	Chestermere-Rocky View		2012	Leela Aheer	Wildrose Party
Progressive; Conservative	Everett McDonald	Grande Prairie-Smoky		2012	Todd Loewen	Wildrose Party
Progressive; Conservative	Frank Oberle	Peace River	Minister of Energy, Government House Leader	2004	Debbie Jabbour	New Democratic Party
Progressive; Conservative	Cathy Olesen	Sherwood Park		2012	Annie McKitrick	New Democratic Party
Progressive; Conservative	Blake Pedersen	Medicine Hat		2012	Bob Wanner	New Democratic Party
Progressive; Conservative	Sohail Quadri	Edmonton-Mill Woods		2012	Christina Gray	New Democratic Party
Progressive; Conservative	George Rogers	Leduc-Beaumont		2004	Shaye Anderson	New Democratic Party
Progressive; Conservative	Janice Sarich	Edmonton-Decore		2008	Chris Nielsen	New Democratic Party
Progressive; Conservative	Don Scott	Fort McMurray-Conklin	Minister of Innovation and Advanced Education, Deputy House Leader	2012	Brian Jean	Wildrose Party
Progressive; Conservative	Kerry Towle	Innisfail-Sylvan Lake		2012	Don MacIntyre	Wildrose Party
Progressive; Conservative	Jeff Wilson	Calgary-Shaw		2012	Graham Sucha	New Democratic Party
Progressive; Conservative	Teresa Woo-Paw	Calgary-Northern Hills		2008	Jamie Kleinsteuber	New Democratic Party
Progressive; Conservative	David Xiao	Edmonton-McClung		2008	Lorne Dach	New Democratic Party
Progressive; Conservative	Steve Young	Edmonton-Riverview		2012	Lori Sigurdson	New Democratic Party
Progressive; Conservative	Gene Zwozdesky	Edmonton-Mill Creek	Speaker	1993	Denise Woollard	New Democratic Party
Liberal	Laurie Blakeman	Edmonton-Centre		1997	David Shepherd	New Democratic Party
Independent	Joe Anglin	Rimbey-Rocky Mountain House-Sundre		2012	Jason Nixon	Wildrose Party

== MLAs who did not run again ==
Progressive Conservative

- Rob Anderson, Airdrie
- Wayne Cao, Calgary-Fort
- Cal Dallas, Red Deer-South
- Alana DeLong, Calgary-Bow
- Yvonne Fritz, Calgary-Cross
- Hector Goudreau, Dunvegan-Central Peace-Notley
- Jason Hale, Strathmore-Brooks
- Fred Horne, Edmonton-Rutherford
- Mary Anne Jablonski, Red Deer-North
- Genia Leskiw, Bonnyville-Cold Lake
- Donna Kennedy-Glans, Calgary-Varsity
- Bridget Pastoor, Lethbridge-East
- Bruce Rowe, Olds-Didsbury-Three Hills
- Danielle Smith, Highwood

Wildrose

- Heather Forsyth, Calgary-Fish Creek
- Shayne Saskiw, Lac La Biche-St. Paul-Two Hills

Liberal

- Kent Hehr, Calgary-Buffalo
- Darshan Kang, Calgary-McCall
- Raj Sherman, Edmonton-Meadowlark

== Timeline ==
=== 2012 ===
- April 23: The Progressive Conservative Association of Alberta (PCs) win the 28th Alberta general election. The Wildrose Party wins the second-most seats, for the first time forming the Official Opposition.
- May 3:The election results are certified and made official.
- May 23: The 28th Alberta Legislative Assembly sits for the first time.

=== 2013 ===
- May 14: The Separation Party of Alberta changes its name back to the Alberta First Party name it abandoned in 2004.
- May 14: Edmonton-Manning PC MLA Peter Sandhu resigns from the PC caucus, becoming an Independent.
- July 16: Fort McMurray-Wood Buffalo PC MLA Mike Allen quits the PC caucus after being arrested in the US on a soliciting for prostitution charge.
- December 10: Edmonton-Manning Independent MLA Peter Sandhu rejoins the PC caucus.

=== 2014 ===
- March 12: After an expense scandal involving Premier Redford's trip to the funeral of Nelson Mandela, Calgary-Foothills PC MLA Len Webber leaves the PC caucus to sit as an Independent.
- March 17: Calgary-Varsity PC MLA and Associate Minister for Electricity and Renewable Energy Donna Kennedy-Glans leaves the PC caucus to sit as an Independent.
- March 20: Alison Redford resigns as leader of the PCs, and Dave Hancock is named interim leader.
- March 23: Redford's resignation as Premier comes into effect and Deputy Premier and Edmonton-Whitemud MLA Dave Hancock is sworn in as Premier.
- April 29: An NDP leadership election is initiated when leader Brian Mason announces his pending resignation as leader.
- July 7: Fort McMurray-Wood Buffalo Independent MLA Mike Allen is admitted back into the PC caucus after a caucus vote.
- August 6: PC MLA Alison Redford resigns her Calgary-Elbow seat, triggering a by-election.
- September 6: In the Progressive Conservative Association of Alberta leadership election, former federal cabinet minister Jim Prentice is elected leader.
- September 15: Dave Hancock resigns as Premier and his Edmonton-Whitemud seat, triggering a by-election. Jim Prentice is sworn in as premier.
- September 17: Calgary-Varsity Independent MLA Donna Kennedy-Glans requests, and is accepted back into, the PC caucus.
- September 29: Independent MLA Len Webber resigns his Calgary-Foothills seat, PC MLA Ken Hughes resigns his Calgary-West seat, and by-elections are called in their ridings as well as Calgary-Elbow and Edmonton-Whitemud.
- October 18: At the Alberta NDP convention Rachel Notley is chosen party leader.
- October 27: Four PC MLAs are elected in by-elections: Gordon Dirks in Calgary-Elbow, Jim Prentice in Calgary-Foothills, Mike Ellis in Calgary-West, and Stephen Mandel in Edmonton-Whitemud.
- November 2: Rimbey-Rocky Mountain House-Sundre Wildrose MLA Joe Anglin leaves the Wildrose caucus to sit as an Independent.
- November 24: Innisfail-Sylvan Lake MLA Kerry Towle and Little Bow MLA Ian Donovan leave the Wildrose Party and join the PCs.
- December 17: Nine Wildrose Party MLAs, including leader Danielle Smith and House Leader Rob Anderson cross the floor to join the PCs.
- December 21: Heather Forsyth is named interim leader of the Wildrose Party.

=== 2015 ===
- January 26: Raj Sherman resigns as leader of the Alberta Liberal Party, and PC MLA Doug Griffiths resigns from his Battle River-Wainwright seat.
- January 31: PC MLA Doug Horner resigns his Spruce Grove-St. Albert seat.
- February 1: David Swann is named interim leader of the Alberta Liberal Party.
- March 26: Premier Jim Prentice tables his government's 2015-16 budget.
- March 28: Former Conservative MP Brian Jean wins Wildrose Party leadership election, former Wildrose Party leader Danielle Smith loses PC nomination in Highwood to Okotoks councilor Carrie Fischer
- April 7: Premier Jim Prentice drops the writ, calling for an election on May 5, 2015.
- April 23: Televised leaders' debate.
- May 5: Election results - the NDP win a majority of seats (53), and the Wildrose finish second with 21 seats. The Progressive Conservatives' run of nearly 44 years as government ends with a third-place finish of 10 seats. Premier Prentice announces resignation as PC leader and as Calgary-Foothills MLA. The initial result in Calgary-Glenmore is a tie.
- May 15: Elections Alberta publishes the official result. NDP candidate Anam Kazim wins the riding of Calgary-Glenmore after recount, leaving the NDP holding 54 of 87 seats in the legislature.

== Opinion polls ==

The following is a summary of published polls of voter intentions.

Date of Polling	Polling Firm	Margin of Error (19 times out of 20)	PC	Wildrose	Liberal	NDP	Alberta	Other	Undecided
May 5, 2015	Election 2015		27.8	24.2	4.2	40.6	2.2	1.0	
May 4, 2015	Forum Research	±3 pp	23	23	4	45	3	2	
May 1–4, 2015	Insights West	±3.1 pp	23	27	4	42	3	2	9
Apr. 29–May 3, 2015	EKOS Research Associates	±3.4 pp	22.5	24.0	5.6	44.3	2.2	1.4	
May 2, 2015	Forum Research	±3 pp	21	24	5	42	5	3	
April 29, 2015	Mainstreet Research	±1.85 pp	21	26	5	44	3		14
April 27–29, 2015	Ipsos-Reid	±4.1 pp	24	26	9	37	3	1	
April 25–29, 2015	EKOS Research Associates	±3.7 pp	23.1	21.3	6.3	42.2	4.6	2.6	
April 26–28, 2015	ThinkHQ	±2.1 pp	20	27	9	39	4	1	
April 26–28, 2015	Leger Marketing	±2.8 pp	30	24	6	38	1	1	16
April 25–28, 2015	Return On Insight	±3.6 pp	24	21	10	38	4		
April 23, 2015	Televised leaders' debate								
April 23, 2015	Mainstreet Research	±1.49 pp	26	32	8	31	4		21
April 22–23, 2015	Forum Research	±3 pp	20	25	7	38	6	5	
April 20, 2015	Mainstreet Research	±1.78 pp	25	35	4	31	4		19
April 13, 2015	Mainstreet Research	±1.76 pp	24	31	10	30	5		23
April 7–9, 2015	Forum Research	±2 pp	27	30	12	28	2	2	
April 7, 2015	Dissolution of the 28th Alberta Legislative Assembly, campaign begins								
April 7, 2015	Mainstreet Research	±1.78 pp	27	31	12	26	3		24
April 2–6, 2015	ThinkHQ	±2.3 pp	25	31	12	26	5	1	
March 27–30, 2015	Insights West	±3.9 pp	31	27	14	22	2	5	
March 29, 2015	Mainstreet Research	±1.8 pp	30	30	17	18	5		20
March 28, 2015	Brian Jean becomes leader of the Wildrose Party								
February 13–23, 2015	Environics		46	16	18	17		4	
February 1, 2015	David Swann becomes interim leader of the Liberal Party								
January 26, 2015	Raj Sherman resigns as leader of the Liberal Party								
December 28–30, 2014	Insights West		42	14	19	18		7	
December 21, 2014	Heather Forsyth becomes interim leader of the Wildrose Party								
December 21, 2014	Mainstreet Research		44	20	14	18	4		
December 17, 2014	Danielle Smith resigns as leader of the Wildrose Party, crosses the floor with 8 caucus members to the PCs								
Nov. 28–Dec. 1, 2014	Insights West		35	29	15	16		5	
October 18, 2014	Rachel Notley becomes leader of the New Democratic Party								
October 4–9, 2014	Lethbridge College		32.6	30.8	12.8	16.8		7.0	
September 6, 2014	Jim Prentice becomes leader of the Progressive Conservative Association and Premier								
Aug. 27–Sep. 2, 2014	Leger Marketing		29	33	18	16		4	
June 23–26, 2014	Leger Marketing		26	31	20	19		4	
April 29, 2014	Brian Mason resigns as leader of the New Democratic Party, becomes interim leader								
April 23–26, 2014	Insights West		21	50	11	16		2	
March 20, 2014	Alison Redford resigns as Premier and leader of the Progressive Conservative Association, Dave Hancock becomes interim leader and Premier								
March 10–16, 2014	ThinkHQ		19	46	16	15	3	1	
March 3–9, 2014	Angus Reid		23	46	15	13		4	
February 24–27, 2014	Leger Marketing		25	38	16	15	3	2	
February 14–23, 2014	Environics		36	33	18	12		2	
October 5–6, 2013	Lethbridge College		36.1	29.4	15.7	12.2	1.1	5.6	
September 11–17, 2013	Leger Marketing		33	34	15	15		3	
April 9–12, 2013	Leger Marketing		29	37	17	14		3	
February 12–16, 2013	ThinkHQ		26	38	13	16	3	4	
January 14–20, 2013	Leger Marketing		40	28	12	13		6	
October 10–23, 2012	Environics		45	29	13	12		1	
September 29–30, 2012	Lethbridge College		44.6	23.9	11.1	14.0	3.0	3.4	
August 10–22, 2012	Environics		43	26	14	13		3	
June 11, 2012	Forum Research		39	36	9	12	2	2	
April 23, 2012	Election 2012	±0.0 pp	44.0	34.3	9.9	9.8	1.3	0.7	

== Media endorsements ==
The following media outlets endorsed the Progressive Conservatives during the campaign:

- Calgary Herald (Postmedia)
- Calgary Sun (Postmedia)
- The Globe and Mail (The Woodbridge Company, majority owned by Thomson Reuters)
- Edmonton Journal (Postmedia)
- Edmonton Sun (Postmedia)

No media endorsements were made for any of the other parties.
