= Jason Hale (politician) =

Canadian politician

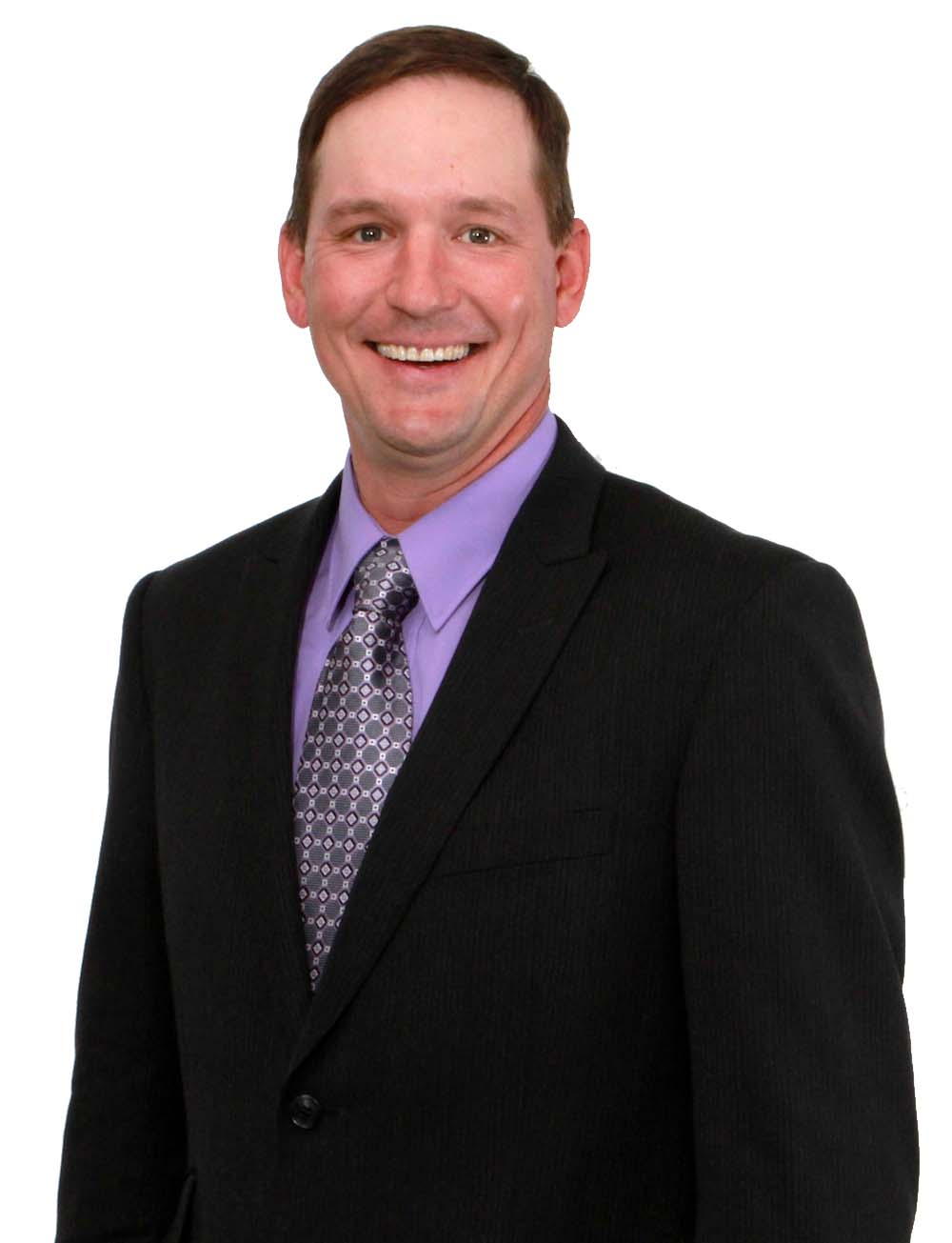

MLA for Strathmore-Brooks
- In office April 23, 2012 – May 5, 2015
- Preceded by: Arno Doerksen
- Succeeded by: Derek Fildebrandt

Personal details
- Born: June 15, 1969 (age 56) Bassano, Alberta
- Party: Wildrose (2012–2014); Alberta Progressive Conservatives (2014–present)
- Profession: Rancher/Oil and gas sector

Jason Hale (born June 15, 1969) is a former Canadian politician who was an elected member to the Legislative Assembly of Alberta representing the electoral district of Strathmore-Brooks.

== Early life and background ==
Hale was born and raised near Bassano, Alberta. Hale, along with his wife and two sons, run a cow/calf operation. He also worked as a consultant in the oil and gas industry before becoming an MLA.

Hale graduated from SAIT with a diploma in chemical technology. Hale was also a professional bull fighter for 10 years, a member of the Bassano Rodeo committee for the past eight years, and a director on the Bassano Ag Society for three years. He has regularly volunteered as a coach for hockey and baseball.

== Political career ==
He was elected in the 2012 provincial election as a member of the Wildrose Party. In December 2012 Hale crossed the floor to join Jim Prentice's Progressive Conservative Party. One month after Derek Fildebrandt announced that he would seak the Wildrose nomination in Strathmore-Brooks, Hale announced that he would not seek re-election.

As the local MLA, Hale took the lead for the Wildrose Official Opposition when the XL Foods plant in Brooks was shut down due to contamination. Hale welcomed the takeover of the plant by JBS and called for a full investigation into the causes of the contamination.

In May 2013, Hale and MLA Kerry Towle held a press conference along with residents of Brooks to criticize conditions at AgeCare facilities in Brooks and alleged seniors abuse had occurred. The pressure from Hale, Towle, Brooks residents and the Wildrose Party caused the Minister of Health Fred Horne to order an investigation into the alleged mistreatment.

== Electoral history ==
2012 Alberta general election: Strathmore-Brooks
| Party | Candidate | Votes | % | ±% |
|---|---|---|---|---|
| Wildrose | Jason Hale | 8,157 | 55.58 | +46.44 |
| Progressive Conservative | Arno Doerksen | 5,743 | 39.13 | -35.43 |
| New Democratic | Brad Bailey | 409 | 2.79 | -0.27 |
| Liberal | Alex Wychopen | 299 | 2.04 | -7.66 |
| Separation | Glen Dundas | 68 | 0.46 | – |
| Total | | 14,676 | 99.31 | – |
| Rejected, spoiled and declined | | 102 | 0.69 | +0.16 |
| Turnout | | 14,778 | 52.79 | +19.77 |
| Eligible electors | | 27,996 | | |
| Wildrose gain from Progressive Conservative | | Swing | | +40.93 |
Source(s) Source: "83 - Strathmore-Brooks Official Results 2012 Alberta general election". officialresults.elections.ab.ca. Elections Alberta.
