= Alberta First Party =

- Founded: July 13, 1999 (as Alberta First)
- Dissolved: June 22, 2018 (as Alberta First)
- Split from: Alberta Social Credit Party
- Succeeded by: Freedom Conservative Party of Alberta
- Headquarters: Edmonton, Alberta
- Ideology: Conservatism; Alberta separatism
- Political position: Right-wing
- Colours: Black & Yellow
- Seats in Legislature: 0 / 87

The Alberta First Party (French: Alberta d'abord) was an Albertan separatist political party in Alberta, Canada. It went through several iterations before becoming its current incarnation as the Freedom Conservative Party.

== History (1999–2018) ==
=== Early history (1999–2004) ===
The party's first logo as the Alberta First Party, used from 1999 to 2004 and then again from 2013 to 2018

The Alberta First Party emerged from a conflict regarding religious freedom (Mormonism in this case) within the Alberta Social Credit Party. Randy Thorsteinson resigned as leader of the Social Credit Party and helped found a new conservative provincial party. With about 120 supporters, including federal Member of Parliament Rob Anders, they held their first meeting in June 1999 where they selected the name Alberta First Party and adopted fiscally conservative policies similar to the governing Progressive Conservatives but with more socially conservative policies. The party adopted a position to support the creation of a provincial senate as a means of balancing the power held by the existing provincial legislature. The party was incorporated under the society act under the legal name The Society for the Advancement of the Alberta First Party on July 13, 1999. It gained registration with Elections Alberta on November 2, 1999. With more than 500 members now, the party held a convention in Edmonton on January 22, 2000, where it elected its first permanent party leader, John Reil who defeated Neil Wiltzen from Calgary. At the convention, the party adopted policies promoting free votes in the legislature, regular provincial referendums on contentious social issues, and privatizing Alberta health care.

In its first attempt gain a seat in the provincial legislature, the party nominated candidates in two by-elections in 2000. In Edmonton-Highlands, party leader John Reil placed fourth with 3.30% of the vote while, several months later, its candidate in Red Deer-North placed third with 8.15%.

In the 2001 provincial election, Alberta First nominated 16 candidates, who won a total of 8,851 votes, or 0.87% of the provincial total. No candidates were elected. The party's best result came in Cardston-Taber-Warner, where leader John Reil picked up 2,500 votes, to the 5,000 won by the incumbent, Broyce Jacobs.

The party contested its last election under the Alberta First name in the electoral district of Wainwright on April 8, 2002, when Jerry Barber won 1,659 votes, 25.9% of the total, for a strong second-place finish in the by-election.

Reil vacated the leadership and ran for leadership of the Alberta Liberal Party on March 27, 2004. He was defeated, finishing a distant second to Kevin Taft.

His departure left the leadership of the party vacant. It was temporarily de-registered by Elections Alberta after the party failed to file its 2003 financial statements by the March 31, 2004 deadline. It filed past the deadline and the registration was reactivated by Elections Alberta. Shortly after, the party was granted a name change to the Separation Party of Alberta on May 1, 2004.

=== Separation Party (2004–2018) ===
The Separation Party started independently from the Alberta First party and held its founding convention on October 31, 2003 in Red Deer, Alberta. They were unable to gain the signatures required to register their own party and took over the leaderless Alberta First Party sometime in early 2004.

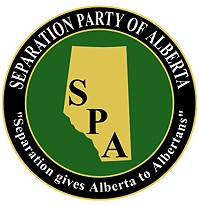
Logo of the Separation Party of Alberta used from 2004 to 2013

The party renamed itself in May 2004 with Elections Alberta and rebranded with a new logo adding Green to the yellow and black color scheme and ran 12 candidates in the provincial election, held on November 22, 2004. Under the leadership of Bruce Hutton, it had some success in rural constituencies. These candidates won a total of 4,680 votes, or 0.5% of the popular vote in the province. Here are the candidates, their ridings, votes and percentages:

- Calgary-Fort, Leo Ollenberger, 212 (2.7%)
- Calgary-Shaw, Daniel Doher, 171 (1.6%)
- Airdrie-Chestermere, Bob Lefurgey, 394 (3.3%)
- Drumheller-Stettler, David Carnegie, 465 (4.5%)
- Highwood, Cory Morgan, 299 (2.8%)
- Little Bow, Grant Shaw, 432 (4.8%)
- Livingstone-Macleod, Jim Walker, 339 (3.4%)
- Olds-Didsbury-Three Hills, Brian Vasseur, 746 (6.1%)
- Red Deer-South, Judy Milne, 261 (2.2%)
- Rocky Mountain House, Bruce Hutton, 505 (4.9%)
- Strathcona County, Roberta McDonald, 297 (2.1%)
- Strathmore-Brooks, Jay Kolody, 559 (6.1%)

After the election, the party stagnated and only nominated one candidate, which was Hutton, in the 2008 election. He received only 119 votes, or 0.01% of the popular vote in the province. This was fewer votes than any of the Separation Party candidates in the 2004 general election.

Sometime in 2012, the party changed its leader when Bart Hampton took over the party. The party's president, Glen Dundas, was the party's only candidate in the 2012 provincial election. He received only 68 votes, or 0.006% of the popular vote in the province.

The party changed its name back to the Alberta First Party on May 13, 2013. Dundas was again the party's only candidate in the 2015 provincial election. The party changed its name again on April 23, 2018 to the Western Freedom Party under new president Bob Lefurgey. Elections Alberta lists no leader for the party.

The party was again renamed the Freedom Conservative Party in June 2018.

=== General elections ===
Election	Banner	Leader	Candidates	Votes	%	Seats	+/-	Position	Government
2001	Alberta First	John Reil	16 / 83	8,851	0.87%	0 / 83	0	▲4th	—N/a
2004	Separation	Bruce Hutton	12 / 83	4,680	0.52%	0 / 83	0	▼7th	—N/a
2008	Separation	Bruce Hutton	1 / 83	119	0.01%	0 / 83	0	7th	—N/a
2012	Separation	Bart Hampton	1 / 87	68	0.005%	0 / 87	0	▼9th	—N/a
2015	Alberta First	Bart Hampton	1 / 87	72	0.005%	0 / 87	0	▼10th	—N/a

=== By-elections ===
Date	Banner	Candidate	Constituency	Votes	%	Place	Leader
June 12, 2000	Alberta First	John Reil	Edmonton-Highlands	270	3.30%	4th	John Reil
September 25, 2000	Alberta First	Patti Argent	Red Deer-North	338	8.15%	3rd	John Reil
April 8, 2002	Alberta First	Jerry Barber	Wainwright	1,695	25.9%	2nd	John Reil

== Leadership history ==
Name	Banner	Date	Notes
John Reil	Alberta First	2000–2004	Elected at convention in Edmonton
Bruce Hutton	Separation Party	2004–2012	Changed party name to Separation Party in 2004.
Bart Hampton	Separation Party/Alberta First	2012–2018	Changed party name back to Alberta First in 2013.
Bart Hampton	Alberta First/Western Freedom Party	2012–2018	Changed party name to Western Freedom Party in April 2018.
Derek Fildebrandt	Freedom Conservative Party	2018–2019	Changed party name to Freedom Conservative Party in June 2018.
