= Freedom Conservative Party of Alberta =

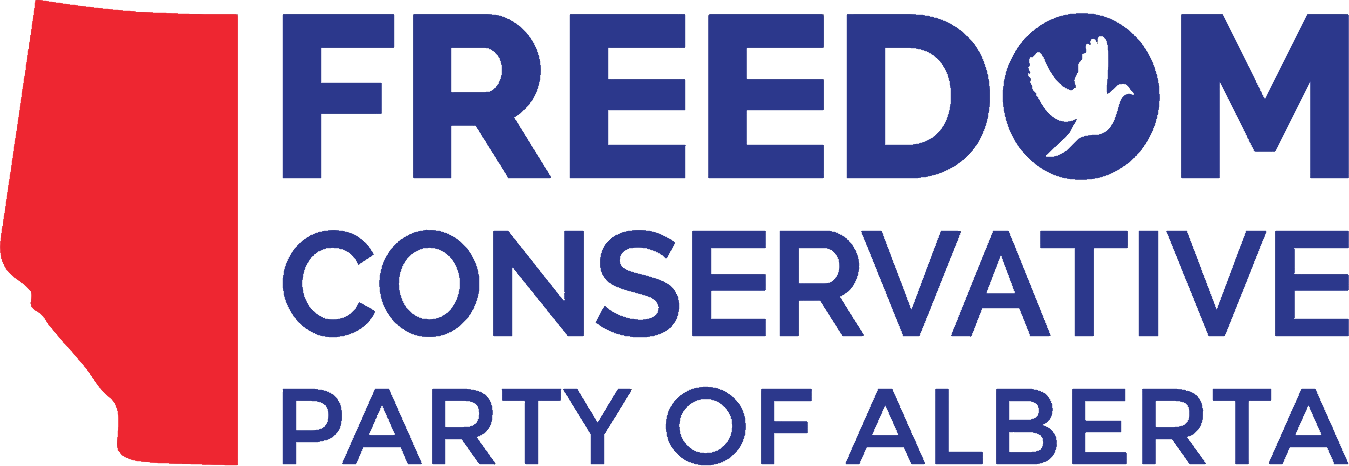
- Leader: David White (interim)
- President: Rick Northey
- Founded: June 22, 2018 (as Freedom Conservative)
- Dissolved: July 23, 2020
- Preceded by: Alberta First Party
- Merged into: Wildrose Independence Party of Alberta
- Headquarters: Edmonton, Alberta
- Membership (2020): 1,063
- Ideology: Right-libertarianism; Fiscal conservatism Alberta autonomism
- Political position: Right-wing
- Colours: Dark blue and red

The Freedom Conservative Party of Alberta (French: Parti de la liberté conservatrice de l'Alberta) was an Albertan autonomist, libertarian and conservative political party in Alberta, Canada.

The party was named the Alberta First Party (French: Alberta d'abord) from 1999 to 2004, when it changed its name to the Separation Party of Alberta (French: Parti de la Séparation de l'Alberta). In 2013, it reverted to Alberta First. In April 2018, it became the Western Freedom Party of Alberta (French: Parti de la liberté de l'Ouest de l'Alberta). On June 22, 2018, it was announced that the Western Freedom Party had changed to its present name.

On April 27, 2020, the party announced plans to merge with Wexit Alberta and for a new party called the Wildrose Independence Party of Alberta. Members of both parties voted to approve the merger on June 29, 2020. In July 2020, Wildrose Independence Party of Alberta was officially registered with Elections Alberta, giving effect to the merger.

== MLAs ==
The party had one member, Derek Fildebrandt, in the Alberta Legislature prior to the 2019 Alberta general election.

== Beliefs ==
According to the founding documents the main objectives of the party were as follows:

1. Autonomy for Alberta
2. Freedom for Alberta
3. Responsibility for Alberta's government.

The Freedom Conservative Party advocates for an autonomous Alberta within a United Canada and is libertarian, and fiscally conservative in its leanings. For example, the parties founding documents call for the government to "pass no law to protect two consenting adults from themselves" and "abolish unnecessary controls over the economy".

Fiscally the founding document lays out that Alberta should "collect no more revenue than is needed and spend no more revenue than is required".

== History ==
The Freedom Conservative Party took over the legal shell of the former Alberta First Party. After changing its name to the Freedom Conservative Party of Alberta on June 22, 2018, it gained its first MLA after Derek Fildebrandt changed his affiliation from Independent Conservative and crossed the floor after being barred from running as a candidate for the United Conservative Party.

He was appointed interim leader, pending a vote. During the announcement of the new party, Fildebrandt stated that it is not a separatist party but rather, its members were "conservatives, libertarians and Alberta patriots".

It plans to run candidates in conservative strongholds, such as rural Alberta. Fildebrandt has stated he intends to avoid placing candidates in ridings where he believes the incumbent governing New Democratic Party would have a chance of winning in case of a split in the conservative vote.

== Leadership election ==
The party's first convention under the Freedom Party name was held in Chestermere and first leadership race since 1999 was held on October 20, 2018. Interim leader Derek Fildebrandt was the only leadership candidate, and therefore was acclaimed as leader. After the 2019 Alberta General Election and resignation of Derek Fildebrandt, David White was elected on the second ballot as Interim Leader of the Freedom Conservative Party at a party meeting in Calgary on May 4, 2019. Three candidates were on the ballot.

2018 Freedom Conservative Party of Alberta leadership election
- Date: October 20, 2018
- Convention: Camp Chestermere, Chestermere
- Won by: Derek Fildebrandt (acclaimed)
- Candidates: 1

== Election results ==
The 30th Alberta general election which will be held in 2019 is the Freedom Conservative Parties first contested election in its current form.

| Election | Leader | Seats | Change | Place | Votes | % | Position |
|---|---|---|---|---|---|---|---|
| 2019 | Derek Fildebrandt | 0 / 87 | ▼1 | ▼6th | 8,982 | 0.54% | No seats |

In the Alberta 2019 election, the party is so far confirmed to be running the following candidates in the following ridings:

- Derek Fildebrandt (Leader) in Chestermere-Strathmore
- Matthew Morrisey in Airdrie-Cochrane
- Rick Northey in Airdrie-East
- Regina Shakirova in Calgary-Bow
- Kari Pomerleau in Calgary-Foothills
- Dejan Ristic in Calgary-Glenmore
- Sheyne Espey in Calgary-Peigan
- Cam Khan in Calgary-North West
- Rio Aiello in Calgary-West
- Wesley Caldwell in Camrose
- Steve Goodman in Drayton Valley-Devon
- Jason Norris in Edmonton-Whitemud
- Malcolm Stinson in Fort Saskatchewan-Vegreville
- Bernard Hancock in Grande Prairie (provincial electoral district)
- Chad Miller in Innisfail-Sylvan Lake
- Jeff Rout in Leduc-Beaumont
- Keith Parrill in Lacombe-Ponoka
- David White in Maskwacis-Wetaskiwin
- Allen Maclennan in Olds-Didsbury-Three Hills
- Connie Russell in Peace River (provincial electoral district)
- Matt Chapin in Red Deer North
- Teah-Jay Cartwright in Red Deer South
- Dawn Berard in Rimbey-Rocky Mountain House-Sundre
- Jim McKinnon in Vermilion-Lloydminster-Wainwright

== Leadership history ==
| Name | Date | Notes |
|---|---|---|
| Derek Fildebrandt | 2018–2019 | Changed party name to Freedom Conservative Party in June 2018. |
| David White (interim) | 2019–2020 | Elected May 4, 2019 on second ballot. Contested with three candidates. |

== See also ==
- Alberta separatism
- Western alienation
