= Canadian federal election results in Calgary =

Seats obtained by party

Conservative
Liberal
Alliance (defunct)
Progressive Conservative (defunct)
Reform (defunct)
Social Credit (defunct)
Labour (defunct)

This is page shows results of Canadian federal elections in the city of Calgary, Alberta.

== Regional profile ==
Calgary is by far the most conservative major city in Canada. This political leaning goes back to the days prior to Alberta's creation as a province, when what was to become Southern Alberta (the Kickinghorse Pass) was selected over Central Alberta (Yellowhead Pass) for the route of the new Canadian Pacific Railway under the auspices of Prime Minister John A. Macdonald.

Prior to Alberta joining confederation in 1905, Calgary (and most of what is now Alberta) was represented by the riding of Alberta (Provisional District). From 1904 to 1917, the riding of Calgary represented Calgary. It was then split into two ridings (Calgary East and Calgary West).

Like rural Alberta, Calgary was a clean sweep for the main right-wing party of the day in all but one election from 1972 to 2011: Progressive Conservatives through 1988, Reform in 1993 and 1997, the Canadian Alliance in 2000 and Conservative since 2004. The one break with this tradition came in 2000, when PC leader Joe Clark took Calgary Centre. Clark's notability of being a former prime minister and the controversy of Stockwell Day's stances on same-sex marriage being an issue that caused many voters in that riding to turn away from Canadian Alliance candidate Eric Lowther and support Clark instead. With Clark having retired by the next election, Calgary returned to a Conservative sweep from 2004 to 2011. The Conservatives won an outright majority of the votes cast in each Calgary riding during this time, with vote-splitting of the residual minority of the vote among the Liberals, New Democratic Party (NDP) and Greens causing none of the races to be even close.

This trend was broken in the November 26, 2012 Calgary Centre by-election, where Liberal Harvey Locke made a formidable showing, capturing nearly 33% of the vote, leaving Conservative Joan Crockatt to capture the riding with just under 37% of the vote. Not only was this well short of a majority, but it was the closest that a centre-left party had come to taking a Calgary riding in memory. The Liberals have increasing support, especially in the centre, and the recent seat re-distributions made Calgary Centre and several other ridings somewhat less safe for the Conservatives. Meanwhile, the NDP has similar overall levels of support as the Liberals, while the Greens are stronger in Calgary than most other areas, with the potential to finish ahead of the Liberals or NDP in some ridings (as is sometimes the case in rural Alberta).

Conservative support is strongest in Calgary Heritage (formerly Calgary Southwest, the riding of Stephen Harper) and Calgary Midnapore (formerly Calgary Southeast, the riding of Jason Kenney), two of the most affluent and ethnically homogeneous Calgary ridings where Conservative support routinely tops 70%. The visible minority communities in Calgary are clustered in the city's northeastern ridings of Calgary McKnight, Calgary Skyview (formerly Calgary Northeast) and Calgary Forest Lawn (formerly Calgary East); however, these two ridings routinely have among the lowest voter turnout levels in urban Canada.

In 2015, Calgary Centre fell to Kent Hehr, the longtime Liberal MLA for Calgary-Buffalo. Calgary Skyview voted for Liberal Darshan Kang. They were the first Liberal MPs elected from Calgary since Pat Mahoney served a single term for Calgary South from 1968 to 1972. As a measure of how deeply conservative Calgary has historically been, the Liberals had only elected three MPs from Calgary-based ridings in their entire history prior to 2015, each for only one term. The city reverted to form in 2019, with the Conservatives again taking all of Calgary amid the massive "blue wave" that swept through Alberta, winning all ten of the city's seats by 10,000 votes or more, however this trend reversed in 2021 as the Liberals won back Calgary-Skyview: while the Conservatives actually had a lower performance than even 2015, vote splitting between the Liberals and NDP meant Conservatives won the rest of the seats in the city. In 2025, amid Conservative gains among visible minority communities, the Liberals lost Calgary Skyview and failed to gain Calgary McKnight (a new seat that contained much of the Liberal-leaning territory from the old Skyview riding), but were able to gain the downtown seat of Calgary Confederation for the first time, leaving the Liberals with a single seat in Calgary once again.

=== Votes by party throughout time ===
Election	Liberal	Conservative	New Democratic	Green	People's	PC	Reform / Alliance	Others
1979	57,969; 25.4%	—	20,772; 9.1%	—	—	144,812; 63.5%	—	4,468; 2.0%
1980	53,142; 25.4%	—	16,583; 7.9%	—	—	129,396; 61.9%	—	9,929; 4.7%
1984	41,144; 14.9%	—	32,267; 11.7%	1,366; 0.5%	—	194,111; 70.4%	—	6,748; 2.4%
1988	41,200; 12.5%	—	43,892; 13.3%	670; 0.2%	—	194,795; 58.9%	46,744; 14.1%	3,155; 1.0%
1993	82,235; 23.8%	—	9,296; 2.7%	1,602; 0.5%	—	55,971; 16.2%	183,772; 53.1%	13,098; 3.8%
1997	77,322; 24.9%	—	12,632; 4.1%	2,397; 0.8%	—	59,807; 19.3%	155,183; 50.0%	3,329; 1.1%
2000	59,697; 16.4%	—	12,701; 3.5%	4,649; 1.3%	—	79,077; 21.7%	206,584; 56.6%	2,118; 0.6%
2004	88,133; 23.1%	232,706; 60.9%	30,050; 7.9%	28,631; 7.5%	—	—	—	2,795; 0.7%
2006	69,260; 16.1%	277,693; 64.7%	43,157; 10.1%	36,441; 8.5%	—	—	—	2,656; 0.6%
2008	54,446; 14.2%	243,255; 63.4%	34,588; 9.0%	42,525; 11.1%	—	—	—	8,785; 2.3%
2011	57,282; 13.7%	275,317; 65.9%	51,691; 12.4%	32,087; 7.7%	—	—	—	1,603; 0.4%
2015	192,749; 33.1%	328,225; 56.3%	41,124; 7.1%	14,569; 2.5%	—	—	—	6,146; 1.1%
2019	111,341; 18.1%	405,208; 65.8%	60,856; 9.9%	22,739; 3.7%	11,424; 1.9%	—	—	4,084; 0.7%
2021	128,173; 22.5%	304,967; 53.4%	95,559; 16.7%	10,113; 1.8%	25,940; 4.5%	—	—	5,983; 1.0%
2025	253,711; 37.2%	396,547; 58.1%	20,363; 3.0%	3,819; 0.6%	3,702; 0.5%	—N/a	—N/a	4,642; 0.7%

Vote share by party

Liberal
Conservative
New Democratic
Green
People's
Reform (defunct)
Alliance (defunct)
Progressive Conservative (defunct)

== 2021 ==
Parties	1st	2nd	3rd	4th	5th
Conservative	9	1	0	0	0
Liberal	1	6	3	0	0
New Democratic	0	3	7	0	0
People's	0	0	0	9	0
Green	0	0	0	1	9

Electoral district	Candidates						Incumbent
Electoral district	Liberal	Conservative	NDP	Green	PPC	Other	Incumbent
Calgary Centre	Sabrina Grover; 17,593	Greg McLean; 30,375	Juan Estevez Moreno; 9,694	Austin Mullins; 971		575	Greg McLean
Calgary Confederation	Murray Sigler; 17,560	Len Webber; 28,367	Gulshan Akter; 10,561	Natalie Odd; 2,295	Edward Gao; 2,670	178	Len Webber
Calgary Forest Lawn	Jordan Stein; 9,608	Jasraj Hallan; 15,434	Keira Gunn; 6,254	Carey Rutherford; 699	Dwayne Holub; 2,468	185	Jasraj Hallan
Calgary Heritage	Scott Forsyth; 8,960	Bob Benzen; 30,870	Kathleen M. Johnson; 9,320	Malka Labell; 766	Bailey Bedard; 2,682	944	Bob Benzen
Calgary Midnapore	Zarnab Zafar; 7,947	Stephanie Kusie; 39,147	Gurmit Bhachu; 11,826	Shaun T. Pulsifer; 868	Jonathan Hagel; 3,930	812	Stephanie Kusie
Calgary Nose Hill	Jessica Dale-Walker; 10,311	Michelle Rempel Garner; 28,001	Khalis Ahmed; 8,500	Judson Hansell; 636	Kyle Scott; 2,324	621	Michelle Rempel Garner
Calgary Rocky Ridge	Shahnaz Munir; 14,693	Pat Kelly; 36,034	Jena Dianne Kieren; 10,748	Catriona Wright; 1,052	Rory Macleod; 3,003	554	Pat Kelly
Calgary Shepard	Cam Macdonald; 10,303	Tom Kmiec; 44,411	Raj Jessel; 12,103	Evelyn Tanaka; 1,300	Ron Vaillant; 4,284	1,158	Tom Kmiec
Calgary Signal Hill	Shawn Duncan; 11,106	Ron Liepert; 35,217	Patrick King; 8,863	Keiran Corrigall; 1,094	Nick Debrey; 2,859	568	Ron Liepert
Calgary Skyview	George Chahal; 20,092	Jag Sahota; 17,111	Gurinder Singh Gill; 7,690	Janna So; 432	Harry Dhillon; 1,720	388	Jag Sahota

== 2015 ==
Electoral district	Candidates						Incumbent
Electoral district	Conservative	NDP	Liberal	Green	Libertarian	Other	Incumbent
Calgary Centre	Joan Crockatt; 27,746; 45.30%	Jillian Ratti; 3,412; 5.57%	Kent Hehr; 28,496; 46.52%	Thana Boonlert; 1,347; 2.20%		Yogi Henderson (Ind.); 248; 0.40%	Joan Crockatt
Calgary Confederation	Len Webber; 30,669; 45.91%	Kirk Heuser; 4,770; 7.14%	Matt Grant; 29,083; 43.53%	Natalie Odd; 2,146; 3.21%		Kevan Hunter (M-L); 140; 0.21%	Michelle Rempel‡ Calgary Centre-North
Calgary Forest Lawn	Deepak Obhrai; 19,694; 47.98%	Abdou Souraya; 4,006; 9.76%	Cam Stewart; 14,762; 35.96%	Judson Hansell; 1,229; 2.99%	Matt Badura; 832; 2.03%	Jason Devine (Comm.); 390 0.95%	Deepak Obhrai; Calgary East
Calgary Forest Lawn	Deepak Obhrai; 19,694; 47.98%	Abdou Souraya; 4,006; 9.76%	Cam Stewart; 14,762; 35.96%	Judson Hansell; 1,229; 2.99%	Matt Badura; 832; 2.03%	Max Veress (DAPC); 134 0.33%	Deepak Obhrai; Calgary East
Calgary Heritage	Stephen J. Harper; 37,263; 63.77%	Matt Masters Burgener; 4,255; 7.28%	Brendan Miles; 15,172; 25.97%	Kelly Christie; 1,246; 2.13%	Steven Paolasini; 246; 0.42%	Nicolas Duchastel de Montrouge (Ind.); 61 0.10%	Stephen Harper; Calgary Southwest
Calgary Heritage	Stephen J. Harper; 37,263; 63.77%	Matt Masters Burgener; 4,255; 7.28%	Brendan Miles; 15,172; 25.97%	Kelly Christie; 1,246; 2.13%	Steven Paolasini; 246; 0.42%	Larry R. Heather (Ind.); 114 0.20%	Stephen Harper; Calgary Southwest
Calgary Heritage	Stephen J. Harper; 37,263; 63.77%	Matt Masters Burgener; 4,255; 7.28%	Brendan Miles; 15,172; 25.97%	Kelly Christie; 1,246; 2.13%	Steven Paolasini; 246; 0.42%	Korry Zepik (Ind.); 73 0.12%	Stephen Harper; Calgary Southwest
Calgary Midnapore	Jason Kenney; 42,415; 66.73%	Laura Weston; 4,915; 7.73%	Haley Brown; 14,396; 22.65%	Brennan Wauters; 1,691; 2.66%		Peggy Askin (M-L); 145; 0.23%	Jason Kenney; Calgary Southeast
Calgary Nose Hill	Michelle Rempel; 32,760; 60.04%	Bruce Kaufman; 4,836; 8.86%	Robert Prcic; 14,671; 26.89%	Laurie Scheer; 1,384; 2.54%	Edward Gao; 727; 1.33%	Faizan Butt (DAPC); 184; 0.34%	Diane Ablonczy†; Calgary—Nose Hill
Calgary Rocky Ridge	Pat Kelly; 38,229; 60.40%	Stephanie Kot; 3,665; 5.79%	Nirmala Naidoo; 20,038; 31.66%	Catriona Wright; 1,360; 2.15%			New District
Calgary Shepard	Tom Kmiec; 43,706; 65.87%	Dany Allard; 4,532; 6.83%	Jerome James; 16,379; 24.69%	Graham MacKenzie; 1,734; 2.61%			New District
Calgary Signal Hill	Ron Liepert; 37,858; 60.55%	Khalis Ahmed; 3,128; 5.00%	Kerry Cundal; 19,108; 30.56%	Taryn Knorren; 1,586; 2.54%	Tim Moen; 679; 1.09%	Jesse Rau (CHP); 160; 0.26%	Rob Anders§ Calgary West
Calgary Skyview	Devinder Shory; 17,885; 39.75%	Sahajvir Singh; 3,605; 8.01%	Darshan Singh Kang; 20,644; 45.88%	Ed Reddy; 846; 1.88%		Daniel Blanchard (M-L); 88 0.20%	Devinder Shory; Calgary Northeast
Calgary Skyview	Devinder Shory; 17,885; 39.75%	Sahajvir Singh; 3,605; 8.01%	Darshan Singh Kang; 20,644; 45.88%	Ed Reddy; 846; 1.88%		Najeeb Butt (PC); 957 2.13%	Devinder Shory; Calgary Northeast
Calgary Skyview	Devinder Shory; 17,885; 39.75%	Sahajvir Singh; 3,605; 8.01%	Darshan Singh Kang; 20,644; 45.88%	Ed Reddy; 846; 1.88%		Stephen Garvey (DAPC); 786 1.75%	Devinder Shory; Calgary Northeast
Calgary Skyview	Devinder Shory; 17,885; 39.75%	Sahajvir Singh; 3,605; 8.01%	Darshan Singh Kang; 20,644; 45.88%	Ed Reddy; 846; 1.88%		Joseph Young (Ind.) (Note: Young was a candidate for the Communist League which is not a registered political party and ineligible to be listed on the ballot. He chose to be listed as an Independent.); 182 0.40%	Devinder Shory; Calgary Northeast

== 2011 ==
Electoral district	Candidates					Incumbent
Electoral district	Conservative	Liberal	NDP	Green	Other	Incumbent
Calgary Centre	Lee Richardson; 28,401; 57.68%	Jennifer Pollock; 8,631; 17.53%	Donna Marlis Montgomery; 7,314; 14.86%	William Hamilton; 4,889; 9.93%		Lee Richardson
Calgary Centre-North	Michelle Rempel; 28,443; 56.53%	Stephen James Randall; 7,046; 14.00%	Paul Vargis; 8,048; 15.99%	Heather MacIntosh; 6,578; 13.07%	Peggy Askin (M-L); 203; 0.40%	Vacant
Calgary East	Deepak Obhrai; 23,372; 67.43%	Josipa Petrunic; 4,102; 11.83%	Al Brown; 4,894; 14.12%	Scott W. Milton; 2,047; 5.91%	Jason Devine (Comm.); 246; 0.71%	Deepak Obhrai
Calgary Northeast	Devinder Shory; 23,550; 56.80%	Cam Stewart; 11,487; 27.71%	Colette Singh; 4,262; 10.28%	Sheila Brown-Eckersley; 1,953; 4.71%	Daniel Blanchard (M-L); 206; 0.50%	Devinder Shory
Calgary—Nose Hill	Diane Ablonczy; 40,384; 70.17%	Margaret McLeod; 6,501; 11.30%	Collin Anderson; 7,189; 12.49%	Tony Hajj; 3,480; 6.05%		Diane Ablonczy
Calgary Southeast	Jason Kenney; 48,173; 76.26%	Brian N. MacPhee; 4,020; 6.36%	Kirk Oates; 6,482; 10.26%	Brett Spencer; 4,079; 6.46%	Antoni Grochowski (Ind.); 225 0.36%	Jason Kenney
Calgary Southeast	Jason Kenney; 48,173; 76.26%	Brian N. MacPhee; 4,020; 6.36%	Kirk Oates; 6,482; 10.26%	Brett Spencer; 4,079; 6.46%	Paul Fromm (WBP); 193 0.31%	Jason Kenney
Calgary Southwest	Stephen J Harper; 42,998; 75.12%	Marlene Lamontagne; 4,121; 7.20%	Holly Heffernan; 6,823; 11.92%	Kelly Christie; 2,991; 5.23%	Larry R. Heather (Ind.); 303; 0.53%	Stephen Harper
Calgary West	Robert Anders; 39,996; 62.16%	Janice Kinch; 11,374; 17.68%	Shawna Knowles; 6,679; 10.38%	Anna Lisa Wagner; 6,070; 9.43%	André Vachon (M-L); 227; 0.35%	Robert Anders

== 2008 ==
Electoral district	Candidates					Incumbent
Electoral district	Conservative	Liberal	NDP	Green	Other	Incumbent
Calgary Centre	Lee Richardson; 26,085; 55.60%	Heesung Kim; 8,402; 17.91%	Tyler Kinch; 4,229; 9.01%	Natalie Odd; 7,778; 16.58%	Antony Tony Grochowski (Ind.); 420; 0.90%	Lee Richardson
Calgary Centre-North	Jim Prentice; 27,361; 56.54%	Doug James; 5,699; 11.78%	John Chan; 7,413; 15.32%	Eric Donovan; 7,392; 15.27%	Peggy Askin (M-L); 184 0.38%	Jim Prentice
Calgary Centre-North	Jim Prentice; 27,361; 56.54%	Doug James; 5,699; 11.78%	John Chan; 7,413; 15.32%	Eric Donovan; 7,392; 15.27%	Jason E. McNeil (Libert.); 345 0.71%	Jim Prentice
Calgary East	Deepak Obhrai; 21,311; 66.47%	Bernie Kennedy; 3,255; 10.15%	Ian Vaughan; 3,768; 11.75%	Nathan David Coates; 3,403; 10.61%	Jason Devine (Comm.); 323; 1.01%	Deepak Obhrai
Calgary Northeast	Devinder Shory; 18,917; 51.52%	Sanam S. Kang; 7,433; 20.24%	Vinay Dey; 3,279; 8.93%	Abeed Monty Ahmad; 2,045; 5.57%	Daniel Blanchard (M-L); 211 0.57%	Art Hanger†
Calgary Northeast	Devinder Shory; 18,917; 51.52%	Sanam S. Kang; 7,433; 20.24%	Vinay Dey; 3,279; 8.93%	Abeed Monty Ahmad; 2,045; 5.57%	Roger Richard (NA); 4,836 13.17%	Art Hanger†
Calgary—Nose Hill	Diane Ablonczy; 35,029; 69.62%	Anoush Newman; 6,657; 13.23%	Stephanie Sundberg; 3,941; 7.83%	Tony Hajj; 4,685; 9.31%		Diane Ablonczy
Calgary Southeast	Jason Kenney; 41,425; 73.89%	Brad Carroll; 4,878; 8.70%	Chris Willott; 4,024; 7.18%	Margaret Chandler; 5,736; 10.23%		Jason Kenney
Calgary Southwest	Stephen Harper; 38,548; 72.96%	Marlene Lamontagne; 4,918; 9.31%	Holly Heffernan; 4,102; 7.76%	Kelly Christie; 4,743; 8.98%	Larry R. Heather (CHP); 256 0.48%	Stephen Harper
Calgary Southwest	Stephen Harper; 38,548; 72.96%	Marlene Lamontagne; 4,918; 9.31%	Holly Heffernan; 4,102; 7.76%	Kelly Christie; 4,743; 8.98%	Dennis Young (Libert.); 265 0.50%	Stephen Harper
Calgary West	Rob Anders; 34,579; 57.36%	Jennifer Pollock; 13,204; 21.90%	Teale Phelps Bondaroff; 3,832; 6.36%	Randy Weeks; 6,722; 11.15%	Kirk Schmidt (Ind.); 1,790 2.97%	Rob Anders
Calgary West	Rob Anders; 34,579; 57.36%	Jennifer Pollock; 13,204; 21.90%	Teale Phelps Bondaroff; 3,832; 6.36%	Randy Weeks; 6,722; 11.15%	André Vachon (M-L); 155 0.26%	Rob Anders

== 2006 ==
Electoral district	Candidates						Incumbent
Electoral district	Liberal	Conservative	NDP	Green	Canadian Action	Other	Incumbent
Calgary Centre	Heesung Kim; 10,464; 19.19%	Lee Richardson; 30,213; 55.41%	Brian Pincott; 7,227; 13.25%	John N. Johnson; 6,372; 11.69%	Trevor Grover; 250; 0.46%		Lee Richardson
Calgary Centre-North	Matthew Moody; 7,628; 13.70%	Jim Prentice; 31,174; 56.00%	John Chan; 9,341; 16.78%	Mark MacGillivray; 6,573; 11.81%	James S. Kohut; 168; 0.30%	Margaret Peggy Askin (M-L); 194 0.35%	Jim Prentice
Calgary Centre-North	Matthew Moody; 7,628; 13.70%	Jim Prentice; 31,174; 56.00%	John Chan; 9,341; 16.78%	Mark MacGillivray; 6,573; 11.81%	James S. Kohut; 168; 0.30%	Doug Dokis (FPNP); 206 0.37%	Jim Prentice
Calgary Centre-North	Matthew Moody; 7,628; 13.70%	Jim Prentice; 31,174; 56.00%	John Chan; 9,341; 16.78%	Mark MacGillivray; 6,573; 11.81%	James S. Kohut; 168; 0.30%	Michael Falconar (Ind.); 383 0.69%	Jim Prentice
Calgary East	Dobie To; 5,410; 13.56%	Deepak Obhrai; 26,766; 67.10%	Patrick Arnell; 4,338; 10.87%	John Mark Taylor; 2,954; 7.41%	Ghazanfar Khan; 183; 0.46%	Jason Devine (Comm.); 239; 0.60%	Deepak Obhrai
Calgary Northeast	Jaswinder S. Johal; 9,241; 22.06%	Art Hanger; 27,169; 64.86%	Tyler Ragan; 3,284; 7.84%	Trung Nguyen; 1,833; 4.38%		Ron Sanderson (Ind.); 364; 0.87%	Art Hanger
Calgary—Nose Hill	Ted Haney; 9,443; 17.10%	Diane Ablonczy; 37,815; 68.49%	Bruce Kaufman; 4,385; 7.94%	Juliet Burgess; 3,573; 6.47%			Diane Ablonczy
Calgary Southeast	James Ludwar; 6,193; 10.35%	Jason Kenney; 44,987; 75.18%	Eric Leavitt; 4,584; 7.66%	Gus Gutoski; 4,076; 6.81%			Jason Kenney
Calgary Southwest	Mike Swanson; 6,553; 11.41%	Stephen J. Harper; 41,549; 72.36%	Holly Heffernan; 4,628; 8.06%	Kim Warnke; 4,407; 7.68%		Larry R. Heather (CHP); 279; 0.49%	Stephen Harper
Calgary West	Jennifer Pollock; 14,328; 22.12%	Rob Anders; 38,020; 58.71%	Teale Phelps Bondaroff; 5,370; 8.29%	Danielle Roberts; 6,653; 10.27%	Tim Cayzer; 265; 0.41%	André Vachon (M-L); 125; 0.19%	Rob Anders

== 2004 ==
Electoral district	Candidates					Incumbent
Electoral district	Liberal	Conservative	NDP	Green	Other	Incumbent
Calgary Centre	Julia Turnbull; 15,305	Lee Richardson; 26,192	Keith Purdy; 4,350	Phillip K. Liesemer; 5,080	274	Joe Clark (Note: Elected as a Progressive Conservative in 2000, declined to join the Conservative caucus upon the merger of the Progressive Conservative party and the Canadian Alliance.)
Calgary East	James Maxim; 7,621	Deepak Obhrai; 21,897	Elizabeth Thomas; 3,535	Dean Kenneth Christie; 2,529	245	Deepak Obhrai
Calgary North Centre	Cathy Mcclusky; 11,093	Jim Prentice; 28,143	John Chan; 6,298	Mark Macgillivray; 5,840	564	New district
Calgary Northeast	Dale Muti; 8,672	Art Hanger; 21,924	Giorgio Cattabeni; 2,682	Morgan Duford; 1,658	291	Art Hanger
Calgary—Nose Hill	Ted Haney; 11,051	Diane Ablonczy; 31,088	Vinay Dey; 3,250	Richard Larson; 2,898		Diane Ablonczy
Calgary Southeast	Jim Tanner; 8,488	Jason Kenney; 36,843	Brian Pincott; 3,419	George Read; 3,142		Jason Kenney
Calgary Southwest	Avalon Roberts; 9,501	Stephen Harper; 35,297	Daria Fox; 2,884	Darcy Kraus; 3,210	745	Stephen Harper
Calgary West	Justin Thompson; 16,402	Rob Anders; 31,322	Tim Patterson; 3,632	Danielle Roberts; 4,274	402	Rob Anders

== 2000 ==
Parties	1st	2nd	3rd	4th
Alliance	6	1	0	0
Progressive Conservative	1	3	3	0
Liberal	0	3	3	0
New Democratic	0	0	0	7

Electoral district	Candidates						Incumbent
Electoral district	Liberal	Canadian Alliance	PC	NDP	Green	Other	Incumbent
Calgary Centre	Joanne Levy; 5,630	Eric Lowther; 22,054	Joe Clark; 26,358	Don Lepan; 1,604	Michael Alvarez-Toye; 1,170	426	Eric Lowther
Calgary East	Doug Perras; 6,843	Deepak Obhrai; 18,141	Roger Richard; 5,510	Kaie Jones; 1,444		1,498	Deepak Obhrai
Calgary Northeast	Sam Keshavjee; 9,841	Art Hanger; 28,242	Jerry Vague; 5,222	H. Ken Sahil; 1,852			Art Hanger
Calgary Southeast	Dana Peace; 6,646	Jason Kenney; 34,492	Ray Clark; 11,353	Giorgio Cattabeni; 1,111	James Stephen Kohut; 931		Jason Kenney
Calgary Southwest	Barry J. Rust; 7,954	Preston Manning; 34,529	Paul Monaghan; 8,679	Jennifer Stewart; 2,113			Preston Manning
Calgary West	Frank Bruseker; 11,181	Rob Anders; 33,222	Jim Silye; 13,259	Greg Klassen; 2,350	Evan Osenton; 1,456		Rob Anders
Calgary—Nose Hill	Brian Thiessen; 11,602	Diane Ablonczy; 35,904	James F. Mcardle; 8,696	Jon Adams; 2,227	Andrew Pickles; 1,092	194	Diane Ablonczy

== 1997 ==
Parties	1st	2nd	3rd	4th
Reform	7	0	0	0
Liberal	0	5	2	0
Progressive Conservative	0	2	5	0
New Democratic	0	0	0	7

Electoral district	Candidates						Incumbent
Electoral district	Liberal	Reform	PC	NDP	Green	Other	Incumbent
Calgary Centre	Bev Longstaff; 16,231	Eric Lowther; 19,936	Rob Gray; 9,230	Duncan Green; 3,011	Andrea Welling; 893	440	Jim Silye
Calgary East	Nagah Hage; 6,766	Deepak Obhrai; 13,348	Roger Richard; 7,306	Kaie Jones; 1,926		329	New district
Calgary Northeast	John Phillips; 8,646	Art Hanger; 18,719	Suzanne Sawyer; 5,815	Bruce Potter; 1,209		1,531	Art Hanger
Calgary Southeast	Patti-Anne Kay; 8,131	Jason Kenney; 24,602	Carol Kraychy; 10,567	Jason Ness; 1,176		235	Jan Brown (Note: Elected as a Reform MP in 1993. Left the Reform caucus in 1996 to sit as an Independent Reform and then Independent later in 1996. Ran as a Progressive-Conservative in Calgary Southwest in the 1997 election.)
Calgary Southwest	Paul Drager; 9,706	Preston Manning; 27,912	Jan Brown; 8,617	Mara Vogel; 1,322	Sol Candel; 310	264	Preston Manning
Calgary West	Dave Bronconnier; 15,277	Rob Anders; 24,878	Sergei Scurfield; 9,594	Michael Kozakavich; 2,105	Jack Locke; 557	293	Stephen Harper
Calgary—Nose Hill	James Maxim; 12,565	Diane Ablonczy; 25,788	Pat Murray; 8,678	Andrea Garnier; 1,883	Frank Young; 637	237	Diane Ablonczy; Calgary North

== 1993 ==
Parties	1st	2nd	3rd	4th
Reform	6	0	0	0
Liberal	0	4	2	0
Progressive Conservative	0	2	4	0
New Democratic	0	0	0	6

Electoral district	Candidates							Incumbent
Electoral district	Liberal	Reform	NDP	PC	National	Green	Other	Incumbent
Calgary Centre	Bob Blair; 15,157	Jim Silye; 22,600	Catherine McCreary; 2,149	Sean O'Neil; 7,466	Peter Hoff; 1,743	Rebecca Matiowsky; 482	540	Harvie Andre
Calgary North	James Maxim; 17,899	Diane Ablonczy; 35,508	Andrea Garnier; 1,592	Al Johnson; 10,424	Mike Schubert; 1,357	Michael Alvarez-Toye; 341	582	Al Johnson
Calgary Northeast	Colin Macdonald; 15,011	Art Hanger; 20,602	Ken Richmond; 1,310	David Aftergood; 5,229	Ray McLeod; 857	Norm Norcross; 135	3,306	Alex Kindy (Note: Elected as a Progressive Conservative in 1988, left caucus in 1993 to sit as independent.)
Calgary Southeast	Quoi Nguyen; 7,642	Jan Brown; 33,564	Neale Smith; 1,888	Lee Richardson; 11,287	Jocelyne Wandler; 1,109		593	Lee Richardson
Calgary Southwest	Bill Richards; 11,087	Preston Manning; 41,630	Catherine Rose; 1,099	Bobbie Sparrow; 12,642	Lea Russell; 910	Sol Candel; 301	334	Bobbie Sparrow
Calgary West	Karen Gainer; 15,314	Stephen Harper; 30,209	Rudy Rogers; 1,194	Jim Hawkes; 9,090	Kathleen McNeil; 1,067	Don Francis; 343	604	Jim Hawkes

== 1988 ==
Parties	1st	2nd	3rd	4th
Progressive Conservative	6	0	0	0
Reform	0	3	2	1
New Democratic	0	2	1	3
Liberal	0	1	3	2

Electoral district	Candidates					Incumbent
Electoral district	PC	Liberal	NDP	Reform	Other	Incumbent
Calgary Centre	Harvie Andre; 28,794	Bob Robinson; 6,280	Elaine Husband; 10,731	John A. Hamilton; 6,662	1,135	Harvie Andre
Calgary North	Al Johnson; 35,212	Jim Bennett; 7,925	Tom Schepens; 7,626	William Murray Smith; 9,889	332	Paul Gagnon
Calgary Northeast	Alex Kindy; 25,890	Anil Giga; 7,663	Ken Richmond; 7,319	Stewart Larsen; 6,155	296	Alex Kindy; Calgary East
Calgary Southeast	Lee Richardson; 32,477	Dale Muti; 5,305	Kathy Miller; 6,837	Gerry Maloney; 6,648	558	New district
Calgary Southwest	Bobbie Sparrow; 40,397	Percy Baker; 7,147	Vera Vogel; 5,024	Janet Jessop; 8,316	1,109	Bobbie Sparrow; Calgary South
Calgary West	Jim Hawkes; 32,025	John Phillips; 6,880	Richard D. Vanderberg; 6,355	Stephen Harper; 9,074	395	Jim Hawkes
