= Conservative Party of Canada candidates in the 2008 Canadian federal election =

This is a list of nominated candidates for the Conservative Party of Canada in the 40th Canadian federal election. The party nominated 307 out of a possible 308 candidates, Portneuf—Jacques-Cartier was the only riding not to field a Conservative candidate.

== Newfoundland and Labrador - 7 seats ==
Riding	Candidate's Name	Notes	Gender	Residence	Occupation	Votes	%	Rank
Avalon	Fabian Manning	incumbent MP	M	St. Bride's	Parliamentarian	11,542	35.2%	2nd
Bonavista—Gander—Grand Falls—Windsor	Andrew House		M	Gander	Lawyer	4,354	15.2%	2nd
Humber—St. Barbe—Baie Verte	Lorne Robinson		M	Pasadena	Financial Planner	2,799	10.6%	3rd
Labrador	Lacey Lewis		F	Ottawa	Office Assistant	615	8.0%	3rd
Random—Burin—St. George's	Herb Davis		M	Gatineau	Policy Advisor	4,791	20.5%	3rd
St. John's East	Craig Westcott		M	Conception Bay South	Journalist	3,836	9.3%	3rd
St. John's South—Mount Pearl	Merv Wiseman		M	North Harbour	Maritime Search & Rescue Coordinator	4,324	12.6%	3rd

== Prince Edward Island - 4 seats ==
Riding	Candidate	Notes	Gender	Residence	Occupation	Votes	%	Rank
Cardigan	Sid McMullin		M	Georgetown	Human Resource Officer	5,661	29.6%	2nd
Charlottetown	Thomas L. DeBlois		M	Charlottetown	Business Manager	5,704	32.1%	2nd
Egmont	Gail Shea	Former Provincial MLA	F	Tignish	Former Civil Servant	8,110	43.9%	1st
Malpeque	Mary Crane		F	Kensington	Educator	7,388	39.3%	2nd

== Nova Scotia - 11 seats ==
=== Cape Breton—Canso ===
Allan R. Murphy

=== Central Nova ===
Peter MacKay, incumbent MP and Minister of National Defence

=== Cumberland—Colchester—Musquodoboit Valley ===
Joel Bernard

=== Dartmouth—Cole Harbour ===
Wanda Webber

=== Halifax ===
Ted Larsen

=== Halifax West ===
Rakesh Khosla

=== Kings—Hants ===
Rosemary Segado

=== Sackville—Eastern Shore ===
David K. Montgomery

=== South Shore—St. Margaret's ===
Gerald Keddy, incumbent MP

=== Sydney—Victoria ===
Kristen Rudderham

=== West Nova ===
Greg Kerr

== New Brunswick - 10 seats ==
=== Acadie—Bathurst ===
Jean-Guy Dubé

=== Beauséjour ===
Omer Léger, former provincial cabinet minister under Richard Hatfield

=== Fredericton ===
Keith Ashfield, former provincial cabinet minister under Bernard Lord

=== Fundy Royal ===
Rob Moore - Incumbent MP

=== Madawaska—Restigouche ===
Jean-Pierre Ouellet former provincial cabinet minister under Richard Hatfield

=== Miramichi ===
Tilly Gordon

=== Moncton—Riverview—Dieppe ===
Daniel Allain, CEO of Downtown Moncton Centre-Ville.

=== New Brunswick Southwest ===
Greg Thompson - Incumbent MP and Minister of Veteran Affairs

=== Saint John ===
Rodney Weston, former provincial cabinet minister under Bernard Lord

=== Tobique—Mactaquac ===
Mike Allen - Incumbent MP

== Quebec - 75 seats ==
Riding	Candidate's Name	Notes	Gender	Residence	Occupation	Votes	%	Rank
Bas-Richelieu—Nicolet—Bécancour	Réjean Bériault	Bériault was born in March 1961 in Lachine. He holds a diploma in public administration from HEC Montréal, a certificate in law from the University of Montreal, and a Bachelor's Degree in legal sciences at the University of Quebec in Montreal.	M			8,904	18.15	2nd
Brome—Missisquoi	Mark Quinlan	Quinlan was born in Cowansville. He has bachelor's degrees in civil law and finance and a graduate diploma from Université de Sherbrooke in notarial law. He joined the Canadian Alliance in 2000, ran for the party in that year's federal election, and was later employed by the party as a press secretary. A Stockwell Day loyalist, he was dismissed from office when Stephen Harper succeeded Day as party leader in March 2002. After the Conservatives formed a minority government in 2006, he was hired as a press secretary for Justice Minister Vic Toews, and later followed Toews to a new posting at the Treasury Board of Canada. He became the press secretary for Christian Paradis later in the same year and continued to serve with Paradis after the 2008 election. Quinlan's mother, Pauline Quinlan, is the mayor of Bromont.	M			9,309	18.66	3rd
Outremont	Lulzim Laloshi	Laloshi was thirty-two years old at the time of the election and was described as the leader of Quebec's Albanian Community in Montreal.	M		Computer Specialist	3,820	10.53	4th
Shefford	Jean Lambert	Lambert was born and raised in Granby and has worked in public relations and advertising in Granby, Montreal, and Quebec City. He was at one time a vice-president of Groupaction and testified before the Gomery Commission on the firm's activities.	M			9,927	19.63	3rd

=== Abitibi—Baie-James—Nunavik—Eeyou ===
Jean-Maurice Matte Abitibi

=== Abitibi—Témiscamingue ===
Pierre Grandmaitre

=== Ahuntsic ===
Jean Précourt

=== Alfred-Pellan ===
Alexandre Salameh

=== Argenteuil—Papineau—Mirabel ===
Scott Pearce

=== Beauce ===
Maxime Bernier, incumbent MP.

=== Beauharnois—Salaberry ===
Dominique Bellemare

=== Beauport—Limoilou ===
Sylvie Boucher

=== Berthier—Maskinongé ===
Marie-Claude Godue

=== Bourassa ===
Michelle Allaire

=== Brossard—La Prairie ===
Maurice Brossard

=== Chambly—Borduas ===
Suzanne Chartand

=== Charlesbourg—Haute-Saint-Charles ===
Daniel Petit, incumbent MP.

=== Châteauguay—Saint-Constant ===
Pierre-Paul Routhier

=== Chicoutimi—Le Fjord ===
Jean-Guy Maltais

=== Compton—Stanstead ===
Michel Gagné

=== Drummond ===
André Komlosy

=== Gaspésie—Îles-de-la-Madeleine ===
Darryl Gray

=== Gatineau ===
Denis Tassé

=== Haute-Gaspésie—La Mitis—Matane—Matapédia ===
Jérôme Landry

=== Hochelaga ===
Luc Labbé

=== Honoré-Mercier ===
Rodrigo Alfaro

=== Hull—Aylmer ===
Paul Fréchette

=== Joliette ===
Sylvie Lavallée

=== Jonquière—Alma ===
Jean-Pierre Blackburn, incumbent MP and Minister of Labour

=== La Pointe-de-l'Île ===
Hubert Pichet

=== Lac-Saint-Louis ===
Andrea Paine

=== LaSalle—Émard ===
Béatrice Guay-Pepper

=== Laurentides—Labelle ===
Guy Joncas

=== Laval ===
Jean-Pierre Bélisle

=== Laval—Les Îles ===
Agop Evereklian

=== Lévis—Bellechasse ===
Steven Blaney

=== Longueuil—Pierre-Boucher ===
Jacques Bouchard

=== Lotbinière—Chutes-de-la-Chaudière ===
Jacques Gourde

=== Louis-Hébert ===
Luc Harvey

=== Louis-Saint-Laurent ===
Josée Verner

=== Manicouagan ===
Pierre Breton

=== Marc-Aurèle-Fortin ===
Claude Moreau

=== Mégantic—L'Érable ===
Christian Paradis

=== Montcalm ===
Claude Marc Boudreau

=== Montmagny—L'Islet—Kamouraska—Rivière-du-Loup ===
Denis Laflamme

=== Montmorency—Charlevoix—Haute-Côte-Nord ===
Guy-Léonard Tremblay

=== Mount Royal ===
Rafael Tzoubari

=== Notre-Dame-de-Grâce—Lachine ===
Carmine Pontillo

=== Papineau ===
Mustague Sarker

=== Pierrefonds—Dollard ===
Pierre-Olivier Brunelle

=== Pontiac ===
Lawrence Cannon, incumbent MP.

=== Portneuf-Jacques-Cartier ===
No Candidate

=== Québec ===
Myriam Taschereau

=== Repentigny ===
Bruno Royer

=== Richmond—Arthabaska ===
Éric Lefebvre

=== Rimouski-Neigette—Témiscouata—Les Basques ===
Gaston Noël

=== Rivière-des-Mille-Îles ===
Claude Carignan

=== Rivière-du-Nord ===
Gilles Duguay

=== Roberval—Lac-Saint-Jean ===
Denis Lebel

=== Rosemont—La Petite-Patrie ===
Sylvie Boulianne

=== Saint-Bruno—Saint-Hubert ===
Nicole Charbonneau Barron

=== Saint-Hyacinthe—Bagot ===
René Vincelette

=== Saint-Jean ===
Marie-Josée Mercier

=== Saint-Lambert ===
Patrick Clune

=== Saint-Laurent—Cartierville ===
Dennis Galiatsatos

=== Saint-Léonard—Saint-Michel ===
Lucie Le Tourneau

=== Saint-Maurice—Champlain ===
Stéphane Roof

=== Sherbrooke ===
André Bachand

=== Terrebonne—Blainville ===
Daniel Lebel

=== Trois-Rivières ===
Claude Durand

=== Vaudreuil—Soulanges ===
Michael Fortier, Minister of Public Works

=== Verchères—Les Patriotes ===
Benoît Dussault

=== Westmount—Ville-Marie ===
Guy Dufort

== Ontario - 106 seats ==
=== Ajax—Pickering ===
Rick Johnson

=== Algoma—Manitoulin—Kapuskasing ===
Dianne Musgrove

=== Ancaster—Dundas—Flamborough—Westdale ===
David Sweet

=== Barrie ===
Patrick Brown

=== Beaches—East York ===
Caroline Alleslev

=== Bramalea—Gore—Malton ===
Stella Ambler

=== Brampton—Springdale ===
Parm Gill

=== Brampton West ===
Kyle Seeback

=== Brant ===
Phil McColeman

=== Bruce—Grey—Owen Sound ===
Larry Miller

=== Burlington ===
Mike Wallace

=== Cambridge ===
Gary Goodyear

=== Carleton—Mississippi Mills ===
Gordon O'Connor, incumbent MP and Minister of National Revenue.

=== Chatham-Kent—Essex ===
Dave Van Kesteren

=== Davenport ===
Theresa Rodriguez

=== Don Valley East ===
Eugene McDermott

=== Don Valley West ===
John Carmichael

=== Dufferin—Caledon ===
David Tilson

=== Durham ===
Bev Oda, incumbent MP.

=== Eglinton—Lawrence ===
Joe Oliver

=== Elgin—Middlesex—London ===
Joe Preston

=== Essex ===
Jeff Watson

=== Etobicoke Centre ===
Axel Kuhn

=== Etobicoke—Lakeshore ===
Patrick Boyer

=== Etobicoke North ===
Bob Saroya

=== Glengarry—Prescott—Russell ===
Pierre Lemieux

=== Guelph ===
Gloria Kovach

=== Haldimand—Norfolk ===
Diane Finley, incumbent MP and Minister of Citizenship and Immigration.

=== Haliburton—Kawartha Lakes—Brock ===
Barry Devolin

=== Halton ===
Lisa Raitt is the president and chief executive officer of the Toronto Port Authority (TPA), a Canadian federal corporation that manages commerce, transportation (including the Toronto City Centre Airport) and recreation in the Toronto harbour. She has also served as the TPA's corporate secretary and general counsel, and harbourmaster. She is believed to have been the first female harbourmaster of a Canadian port. She is currently on unpaid leave from the TPA for the duration of the election. Lisa Raitt's OFFICIAL Campaign Website Lisa Raitt's Campaign Blog

=== Hamilton Centre ===
Leon O'Connor

=== Hamilton East—Stoney Creek ===
Frank Rukavina

=== Hamilton Mountain ===
Terry Anderson

=== Huron—Bruce ===
Ben Lobb

=== Kenora ===
Greg Rickford

=== Kingston and the Islands ===
Brian Abrams

=== Kitchener Centre ===
Stephen Bonner

=== Kitchener—Conestoga ===
Harold Albrecht

=== Kitchener—Waterloo ===
Peter Braid

=== Lambton—Kent—Middlesex ===
Bev Shipley

=== Lanark—Frontenac—Lennox and Addington ===
Scott Reid

=== Leeds—Grenville ===
Gord Brown

=== London—Fanshawe ===
Mary Lou Ambrogio

=== London North Centre ===
Paul Van Meerbergen

=== London West ===
Ed Holder

=== Markham—Unionville ===
Duncan Fletcher

=== Mississauga—Brampton South ===
Salma Ataullahjan is a current Canadian Senator appointed on July 9, 2010.

=== Mississauga East—Cooksville ===
Melissa Bhagat

=== Mississauga—Erindale ===
Bob Dechert

=== Mississauga South ===
Hugh Arrison

=== Mississauga—Streetsville ===
Wajid Khan, incumbent MP.

=== Nepean—Carleton ===
Pierre Poilievre

=== Newmarket—Aurora ===
Lois Brown

=== Niagara Falls ===
Rob Nicholson, incumbent MP and Minister of Justice.

=== Niagara West—Glanbrook ===
Dean Allison, incumbent MP.

=== Nickel Belt ===
Ian McCracken

=== Nipissing—Timiskaming ===
Joe Sinicrope

=== Northumberland—Quinte West ===
Rick Norlock

=== Oak Ridges—Markham ===
Paul Calandra

=== Oakville ===
Terence Young

=== Oshawa ===
Colin Carrie

=== Ottawa Centre ===
Brian McGarry

=== Ottawa—Orléans ===
Royal Galipeau

=== Ottawa South ===
Elie Salibi

=== Ottawa—Vanier ===
Patrick Glémaud

=== Ottawa West—Nepean ===
John Baird, incumbent MP and Minister of the Environment.

=== Oxford ===
Dave MacKenzie

=== Parkdale—High Park ===
Jilian Saweczko

=== Parry Sound-Muskoka ===
Tony Clement, incumbent MP and Minister of Health.

=== Perth Wellington ===
Gary Schellenberger, incumbent MP

=== Peterborough ===
Dean Del Mastro, incumbent MP

=== Pickering—Scarborough East ===
George Khouri

=== Prince Edward—Hastings ===
Daryl Kramp, incumbent MP

=== Renfrew—Nipissing—Pembroke ===
Cheryl Gallant, incumbent MP.

=== Richmond Hill ===
Chungsen Leung

=== St. Catharines ===
Rick Dykstra, incumbent MP

=== St. Paul's ===
Heather Jewell

=== Sarnia—Lambton ===
Pat Davidson, incumbent MP

=== Sault Ste. Marie ===
Cameron Ross

=== Scarborough—Agincourt ===
Benson Lau

=== Scarborough Centre ===
Roxanne James

=== Scarborough-Guildwood ===
Chuck Konkel

=== Scarborough—Rouge River ===
Jerry Bance

=== Scarborough Southwest ===
Greg Crompton

=== Simcoe—Grey ===
Helena Guergis, incumbent MP

=== Simcoe North ===
Bruce Stanton, incumbent MP

=== Stormont—Dundas—South Glengarry ===
Guy Lauzon

=== Sudbury: Gerry Labelle ===
Gerry Labelle was born in Mattawa and raised in Sudbury. He is a businessperson and community activist in Sudbury, where he operates a consulting firm. Labelle is a founding member of Music and Film in Motion and has served on the board of several non-profit organizations. At the time of the election, he was a member of the Make Poverty History committee on the city's Social Planning Council.

Labelle became involved in a minor controversy during the 2008 campaign when he made statements in a French-language interview that seemed critical of the Conservative government. According to a press release from Liberal incumbent Diane Marleau, Labelle criticized Finance Minister Jim Flaherty for describing Ontario as "the last place" to invest, took issue with the government's decision to abolish the Court Challenges Program of Canada, and said that he was not impressed with the Conservative Party's environmental record. He later issued a retraction, saying that he had not expressed himself clearly and was fully supportive of the Harper government. Labelle also spoke in support of the arts community and rejected arguments that his party was hostile to the arts. Late in the campaign, the Sudbury Star newspaper noted that he "did not come across as a Harper Conservative".

Labelle received 11,073 votes (25.79%), finishing third against New Democratic Party candidate Glenn Thibeault. He has said that he will probably run for Conservatives again.

=== Thornhill ===
Peter Kent

=== Thunder Bay—Rainy River ===
Richard Neumann

=== Thunder Bay—Superior North ===
Bev Sarafin

=== Timmins-James Bay ===
Bill Greenberg

=== Toronto Centre ===
David Gentili

=== Toronto—Danforth ===
Christina Perreault

=== Trinity—Spadina ===
Christine McGirr

=== Vaughan ===
Richard Lorello

=== Welland ===
Alf Kiers

=== Wellington—Halton Hills ===
Michael Chong, incumbent MP.

=== Whitby—Oshawa ===
Jim Flaherty, incumbent MP and Minister of Finance.

=== Willowdale ===
Jake Karns

=== Windsor—Tecumseh ===
Denise Ghanam

=== Windsor West ===
Lisa Lumley

=== York Centre ===
Rochelle Wilner

=== York—Simcoe ===
Peter Van Loan, incumbent MP.

=== York South—Weston ===
Aydin Cocelli

=== York West ===
Kevin Nguyen

== Manitoba - 14 seats ==
=== Brandon—Souris ===
Merv Tweed, incumbent MP.

=== Charleswood—St. James—Assiniboia ===
Steven Fletcher, incumbent MP.

=== Churchill ===
Wally Daudrich

=== Dauphin—Swan River—Marquette ===
Inky Mark, incumbent MP.

=== Elmwood—Transcona ===
Thomas Steen

=== Kildonan—St. Paul ===
Joy Smith, incumbent MP.

=== Portage—Lisgar ===
Candice Hoeppner

=== Provencher ===
Vic Toews, incumbent MP.

=== Saint Boniface ===
Shelly Glover

=== Selkirk—Interlake ===
James Bezan, incumbent MP.

=== Winnipeg Centre ===
Kenny Daodu

=== Winnipeg North ===
Ray Larkin

=== Winnipeg South ===
Rod Bruinooge, incumbent MP.

=== Winnipeg South Centre ===
Trevor Kennerd

== Saskatchewan - 14 seats ==
=== Battlefords—Lloydminster ===
Gerry Ritz, incumbent MP and Minister of Agriculture.

=== Blackstrap ===
Lynne Yelich, incumbent MP.

=== Cypress Hills—Grasslands ===
David L. Anderson, incumbent MP.

=== Desnethé—Missinippi—Churchill River ===
Rob Clarke, incumbent MP.

=== Palliser ===
Ray Boughen

=== Prince Albert ===
Randy Hoback

=== Regina—Lumsden—Lake Centre ===
Tom Lukiwski, incumbent MP.

=== Regina—Qu'Appelle ===
Andrew Scheer, incumbent MP.

=== Saskatoon—Humboldt ===
Brad Trost, incumbent MP.

=== Saskatoon—Rosetown—Biggar ===
Kelly Block

=== Saskatoon—Wanuskewin ===
Maurice Vellacott, incumbent MP.

=== Souris—Moose Mountain ===
Ed Komarnicki, incumbent MP.

=== Wascana ===
Michelle Hunter

=== Yorkton—Melville ===
Garry Breitkreuz, incumbent MP.

== Alberta - 28 seats ==
=== Calgary Centre ===
Lee Richardson, incumbent MP.

=== Calgary Centre-North ===
Jim Prentice, incumbent MP.

=== Calgary East ===
Deepak Obhrai, incumbent MP.

=== Calgary Northeast ===
Devinder Shory

=== Calgary—Nose Hill ===
Diane Ablonczy, incumbent MP.

=== Calgary Southeast ===
Jason Kenney, incumbent MP.

=== Calgary Southwest ===
Stephen Harper, incumbent MP and Prime Minister of Canada.

=== Calgary West ===
Rob Anders, incumbent MP.

=== Crowfoot ===
Kevin Sorenson, incumbent MP.

=== Edmonton Centre ===
Laurie Hawn, incumbent MP.

=== Edmonton East ===
Peter Goldring, incumbent MP.

=== Edmonton—Leduc ===
James Rajotte, incumbent MP.

=== Edmonton—Mill Woods—Beaumont ===
Mike Lake, incumbent MP.

=== Edmonton—St. Albert ===
Brent Rathgeber, former MLA for Edmonton-Calder.

=== Edmonton—Sherwood Park ===
Tim Uppal

=== Edmonton—Spruce Grove ===
Rona Ambrose, incumbent MP.

=== Edmonton—Strathcona ===
Rahim Jaffer, incumbent MP.

=== Fort McMurray—Athabasca ===
Brian Jean, incumbent MP.

=== Lethbridge ===
Rick Casson, incumbent MP.

=== Macleod ===
Ted Menzies, incumbent MP.

=== Medicine Hat ===
LaVar Payne

=== Peace River ===
Chris Warkentin, incumbent MP.

=== Red Deer ===
Earl Dreeshen

=== Vegreville—Wainwright ===
Leon Benoit, incumbent MP.

=== Westlock—St. Paul ===
Brian Storseth, incumbent MP.

=== Wetaskiwin ===
Blaine Calkins, incumbent MP.

=== Wild Rose ===
Blake Richards

=== Yellowhead ===
Rob Merrifield, incumbent MP.

== British Columbia - 36 seats ==
=== Abbotsford ===
Ed Fast, incumbent MP since 2006.

=== British Columbia Southern Interior ===
Rob Zandee

=== Burnaby—Douglas ===
Ronald Leung

=== Burnaby—New Westminster ===
Sam Rakhra

=== Cariboo—Prince George ===
Dick Harris, incumbent MP.

=== Chilliwack—Fraser Canyon ===
Chuck Strahl, incumbent MP and Minister of Indian Affairs and Northern Development.

=== Delta—Richmond East ===
John Cummins, incumbent MP.

=== Esquimalt—Juan de Fuca ===
Troy DeSouza

=== Fleetwood—Port Kells ===
Nina Grewal, incumbent MP.

=== Kamloops—Thompson—Cariboo ===
Cathy McLeod

=== Kelowna—Lake Country ===
Ron Cannan, incumbent MP.

=== Kootenay—Columbia ===
Jim Abbott, incumbent MP.

=== Langley ===
Mark Warawa, incumbent MP since 2004 and Parliamentary Secretary to the Minister of the Environment.

=== Nanaimo—Alberni ===
James Lunney

=== Nanaimo—Cowichan ===
Reed Elley

=== Newton—North Delta ===
Sandeep Pandher

=== New Westminster—Coquitlam ===
Yonah Martin

=== North Vancouver ===
Andrew Saxton

=== Okanagan—Coquihalla ===
Stockwell Day, incumbent MP and Minister for Public Safety.

=== Okanagan—Shuswap ===
Colin Mayes, incumbent MP.

=== Pitt Meadows—Maple Ridge—Mission ===
Randy Kamp, incumbent MP.

=== Port Moody—Westwood—Port Coquitlam ===
James Moore, incumbent MP.

=== Prince George—Peace River ===
Jay Hill, incumbent MP.

=== Richmond ===
Alice Wong

=== Saanich—Gulf Islands ===
Gary Lunn, incumbent MP and Minister of Natural Resources.

=== Skeena—Bulkley Valley ===
Sharon Smith

=== South Surrey—White Rock—Cloverdale ===
Russ Hiebert, incumbent MP.

=== Surrey North ===
Dona Cadman

=== Vancouver Centre ===
Lorne Mayencourt

=== Vancouver East ===
Ryan Warawa

=== Vancouver Island North ===
John Duncan

=== Vancouver Kingsway ===
Salomon Rayek

=== Vancouver Quadra ===
Deborah Meredith

=== Vancouver South ===
Wai Young

=== Victoria ===
Jack McClintock

=== West Vancouver—Sunshine Coast—Sea to Sky Country ===
John Weston

== Yukon - 1 seat ==
=== Yukon ===
Darrell Pasloski

== Northwest Territories - 1 seat ==
=== Western Arctic ===
Brendan Bell

== Nunavut - 1 seat ==
=== Nunavut ===
Leona Aglukkaq, MLA for Nattilik and Health Minister for the Government of Nunavut

== See also ==
- Results of the Canadian federal election, 2008
- Results by riding for the Canadian federal election, 2008

Election	Division	Party	Votes	%	Place	Winner
2000 federal	Sherbrooke	Canadian Alliance	2,284	4.51	3/8	Serge Cardin, Bloc Québécois
2008 federal	Brome—Missisquoi	Conservative	9,309	18.66	3/6	Christian Ouellet, Bloc Québécois

Election	Division	Party	Votes	%	Place	Winner
2006 federal	Shefford	Conservative	12,734	24.76	2/5	Robert Vincent, Bloc Québécois
2008 federal	Shefford	Conservative	9,927	19.63	3/5	Robert Vincent, Bloc Québécois
