= Sergei Tretyakov (intelligence officer) =

Russian intelligence officer and defector

Colonel Sergei Olegovich Tretyakov (Russian: Сергей Олегович Третьяков; 5 October 1956 – 13 June 2010) was a Russian SVR (foreign intelligence) officer, who defected to the United States in October 2000.

== Intelligence career ==
Born 5 October 1956 in Moscow, Tretyakov was a career KGB/SVR officer. Before being posted in New York, he worked in Ottawa, Ontario, Canada.

Starting in 1995, he worked in New York in the position of SVR deputy rezident (station chief) under the diplomatic cover of first secretary at Russia's mission at the United Nations. It was later revealed that Tretyakov was a double agent, passing secrets to Washington, from around 1997.

He was reported to have been close to Sergey Lavrov, Russia's UN mission head.

== Defection ==
In October 2000, Tretyakov disappeared with his wife, daughter, and cat. He told the SVR, in a statement, "My resignation will not harm the interests of the country." It was not until the end of January 2001 that his defection was first reported by the Associated Press. The news was then broken in the Russian media, which reported that Russia's Foreign Ministry was insisting on having a consular meeting with him to make sure he was not being forcibly kept by the US side.

On 10 February 2001, it was revealed, with reference to "several American officials familiar with the case," that the defector "was in fact an officer in the S.V.R., Russia's foreign intelligence service, successor to the Soviet-era K.G.B." The timing of his decision was reportedly partly affected by the death of his mother in 1997, the last close family member still living in Russia the state could threaten.

Upon defection, Tretyakov was debriefed by the Central Intelligence Agency and the Federal Bureau of Investigation. He was given one of the largest US financial packages ever for a foreign defector, over US$2 million, and was resettled, along with his family, with a new name in an unknown location.

== Later life ==
His location has since become known to Russian journalists. Alexey Veselovsky, a TV reporter, interviewed Tretyakov in his house in Florida before he died.

In 2007, Tretyakov and his family were granted US citizenship.

In his interviews published in early 2008, Tretyakov maintained that he had never had any sort of problems when he was in the KGB/SVR service, and he never requested any money from the US government; everything that he had received upon his defection was provided by the US government, on its own initiative.

He also claimed then that the chief motivation for his defection had been his "growing disgust with and contempt for, what was happening in Russia," he said: "I saw with my own eyes what kind of people were governing the country. I arrived at the irrevocable conclusion that to serve those people is immoral, I wanted nothing to do with them." A second motive he mentioned was to provide a better future for his daughter "in a country that has a future."

== Book release ==
In January 2008, Tretyakov gave several interviews to publicize a book of his experiences, Comrade J.: The Untold Secrets of Russia's Master Spy in America after the End of the Cold War, written by journalist Pete Earley. Earley first met Tretyakov through an FBI contact at the Ritz-Carlton in Tysons Corner, Virginia; two FBI agents and two CIA were assigned to Tretyakov as an escort. The SVR responded to the book's release by calling it "self-publicity based on treachery." The book's release in Canada was delayed by the publisher because of legal considerations, namely Tretyakov's accusation that former Progressive Conservative MP Alex Kindy was recruited by an SVR officer at the Russian embassy in Ottawa and paid several times between 1992 and 1993. When promoting his book, Tretyakov said that Russian intelligence was just as active now as in Cold War times, adding that he hoped his book would act as a "wake-up call" to Americans.

Claims

- Azerbaijan's UN ambassador Eldar Kouliev (1994–2000, previously a Soviet diplomat) was "a deep-cover SVR intelligence officer."
- United States Deputy Secretary of State Strobe Talbott was "an extremely valuable intelligence source" who was manipulated by SVR agents to disclose useful information but not a spy.
- Canadian MP Alex Kindy was recruited as a Russian spy.
- KGB chief Vladimir Kryuchkov sent US$50 billion worth of funds of the Communist Party to an unknown location in the lead-up to the collapse of the Soviet Union.
- Raúl Castro was a long-term "special unofficial contact" for SVR.
- "The KGB was responsible for creating the entire nuclear winter story to stop the Pershing II missiles." Tretyakov says that two fraudulent papers about global cooling were commissioned by the KGB but never published, one supposedly by physicist Kirill Kondratyev about dust storms in the Karakum Desert, the other supposedly by climatologist Georgii Golitsyn and mathematicians Nikita Moiseyev and Vladimir Alexandrov about dust storms after a nuclear war. Tretyakov says that the KGB distributed fake findings to "their contacts in peace, anti-nuclear, disarmament, and environmental organisations in an effort to get these groups to publicize the propagandists' script." and "targeted" the Royal Swedish Academy of Sciences journal, Ambio, which carried a key article on the topic, "The atmosphere after a nuclear war: Twilight at noon," in 1982.
- Tretyakov says that from 1979, the KGB wanted to prevent the US from deploying Pershing missiles in Western Europe and, directed by Yuri Andropov, they used the Soviet Peace Committee, a government organization, to organize and finance demonstrations in Europe against US bases.
- Two chiefs of Vladimir Putin's Federal Protection Service (FSO), Viktor Zolotov and General Murov, discussed how to kill the former director of Yeltsin's administration Alexander Voloshin. They also made "a list of politicians and other influential Muscovites whom they would need to assassinate to give Putin unchecked power." However, since the list was very long, Zolotov allegedly announced, "There are too many. It's too many to kill – even for us." An SVR officer who told about that story felt "uneasy" because FSO includes 20,000 troops and controls the "black box" that can be used in the event of nuclear war.
- A claim about privately owned nuclear weapons. Tretyakov described a meeting with two Russian businessman representing a state-created Chetek corporation in 1991. They came up with a fantastic project of destroying large quantities of chemical wastes collected from Western countries at the island of Novaya Zemlya (a test place for Soviet nuclear weapons) using an underground nuclear blast. The project was rejected by Canadian representatives, but one of the businessmen told Tretyakov that he keeps his own nuclear bomb at his dacha outside Moscow. Tretyakov thought that man was insane, but the "businessman" (Vladimir K. Dmitriev) replied, "Do not be so naive. With economic conditions the way they are in Russia today, anyone with enough money can buy a nuclear bomb. It's no big deal really."
- Disinformation over the Internet. He often sent SVR officers to branches of New York Public Library where they got access to the Internet without anyone knowing their identity. They placed propaganda and disinformation to various web sites and sent it in e-mails to US broadcasters.

== Death and allegations of foul play ==
Although Tretyakov died on June 13, 2010, his death was not announced until July 9, 2010. Tretyakov's wife cited cardiac arrest as the probable cause of death and strongly denied the foul play speculations voiced in the media but called his death quite unexpected. According to the Florida medical examiner's report, Tretyakov died after choking to death on a piece of meat; a cancerous tumor was also found in his colon.

Some Russian commentators construed Russia's Prime Minister Vladimir Putin's comments about the ultimate fate that is bound to befall "traitors" made on July 24, 2010, while he was talking to reporters about the members of the 'Illegals Program', as a thinly veiled allusion to Tretyakov's death.

== See also ==
- Mitrokhin Archive
