= Lee Richardson (politician) =

Canadian politician

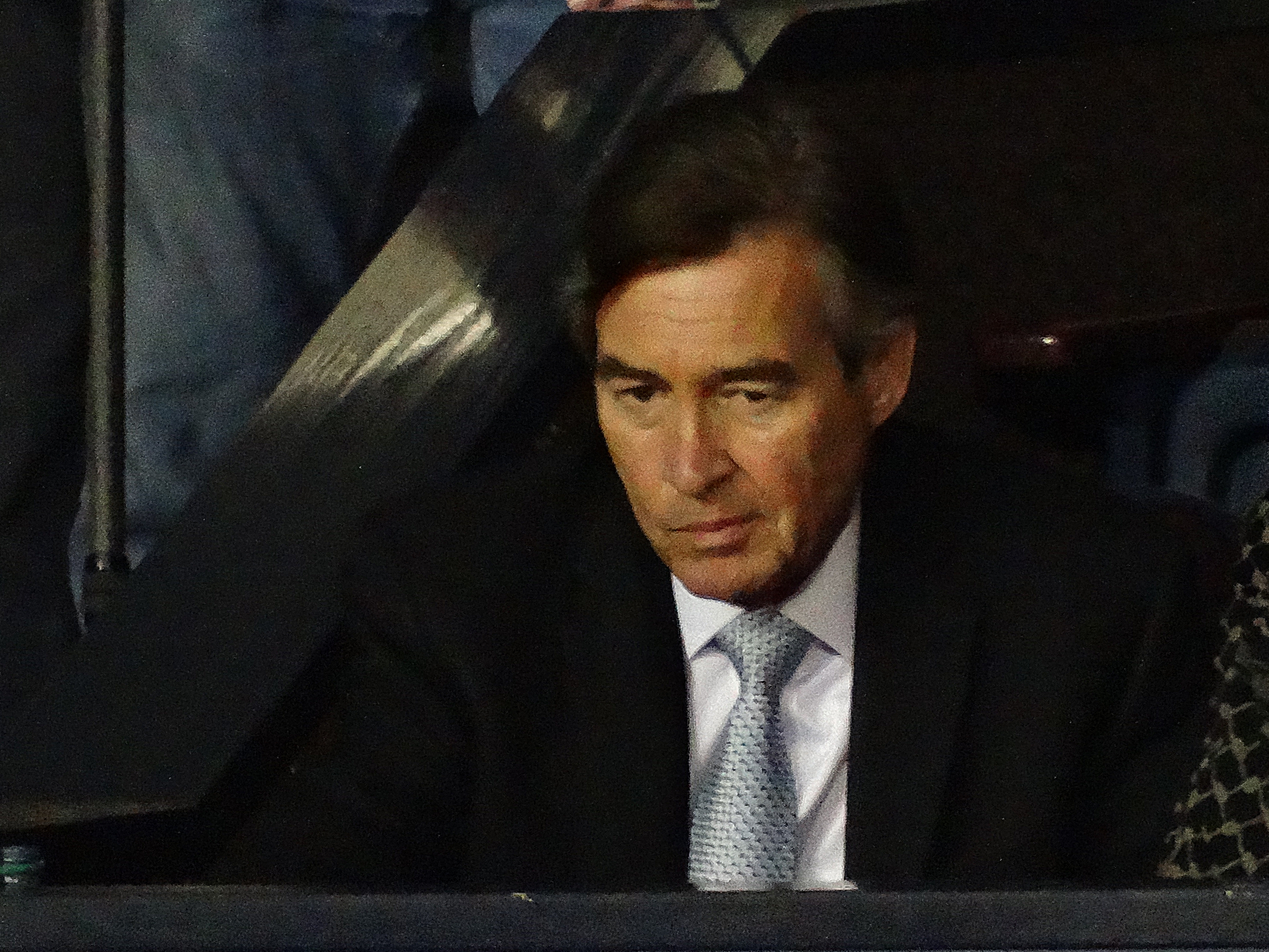

Member of Parliament for Calgary Centre
- In office June 28, 2004 – May 30, 2012
- Preceded by: Joe Clark
- Succeeded by: Joan Crockatt

Member of Parliament for Calgary Southeast
- In office November 21, 1988 – October 25, 1993
- Preceded by: Riding Established
- Succeeded by: Jan Brown

Chair of the Standing Committee on International Trade
- In office November 15, 2007 – June 22, 2011
- Minister: David Emerson; Michael Fortier; Stockwell Day; Peter Van Loan
- Preceded by: Leon Benoit
- Succeeded by: Rob Merrifield

Chair of the Standing Committee on Natural Resources
- In office May 9, 2006 – November 14, 2007
- Minister: Gary Lunn
- Preceded by: Brent St. Denis
- Succeeded by: Leon Benoit

Personal details
- Born: October 31, 1947 (age 78) North Battleford, Saskatchewan, Canada
- Party: Conservative (until 2012)
- Other political affiliations: Progressive Conservative
- Profession: Business Administration

Lee Richardson (born October 31, 1947) is a Canadian businessman and politician. He served as the member of Parliament for the riding of Calgary Southeast from 1988 to 1993 as a member of the Progressive Conservative Party of Canada and for Calgary Centre from 2004 to 2012. He resigned from the House of Commons in 2012 to accept an appointment as principal secretary to the Premier of Alberta.

== Education ==
Richardson was born in North Battleford, Saskatchewan. He was educated at the University of Calgary in Calgary and the University of Alberta in Edmonton. He also attended the University of Oxford in Oxford, England.

== Personal life ==
Richardson married Susanne Reece in 1971 and they had three children. Susanne died from cancer in 1998.

== Early career ==
Lee Richardson entered federal politics serving on Parliament Hill as executive assistant to former Prime Minister John Diefenbaker from 1972 to 1974. From 1974 to 1983 he served successively as executive assistant, director of the office of the premier, and chief of staff to Alberta Premier Peter Lougheed.

In 1983 Richardson returned to Ottawa to serve as Deputy Chief of Staff to the newly elected Progressive Conservative leader and Leader of the Opposition Brian Mulroney. After the 1984 federal election, Richardson served as Prime Minister Mulroney's Deputy Chief of Staff and Special Advisor on Western Affairs. Richardson remained in the Prime Minister's Office until he ran in the 1988 general election in the federal riding of Calgary Southeast. Richardson won with 62.67% of the vote. Richardson's candidacy was the first political endorsement of Peter Lougheed after Lougheed's retirement. Richardson served on the board of directors for the Calgary Olympic Organizing Committee of the 1988 Winter Olympics.

In his first term as a parliamentarian, Richardson served as Parliamentary Secretary to the Minister of Communications and the Minister of Transport. He was instrumental in relocating the National Energy Board to Calgary and placing the Calgary International Airport under local authority. Richardson was defeated in the 1993 federal election by Jan Brown, a Reform Party candidate. He returned to Calgary in 1993 to form Lee Richardson Financial Corporation.

== Return to federal politics ==
Richardson returned to federal politics in 2004, winning the election in the electoral district of Calgary Centre which had previously been held by PC Leader Joe Clark. He was re-elected in 2006, capturing 55.4% of the vote, in 2008 with 55.6% of the vote, and in 2011 with 57.7% of the vote.

Among his parliamentary duties, Richardson first served on the Environment Committee where he became the only Conservative to win the Sierra Club's "Green Parliamentarian" award. Richardson was appointed Chair of the House of Commons Standing Committee on Natural Resources in 2006. From 2007 until 2011, Richardson served as the Chair of the International Trade Committee. According to the Montreal Gazette, "the International Trade Committee, under the genial chair of Conservative Lee Richardson, is a collegial exception to the toxic tone of most House committees."

The International Trade Committee under Richardson chairmanship successfully vetted three free trade agreements. The committee went clause by clause through and referred back to the House the following trade agreements; Bill C-2: An Act to implement the Free Trade Agreement between Canada and the Republic of Colombia, the Agreement on the Environment between Canada and the Republic of Colombia and the Agreement on Labour Cooperation between Canada and the Republic of Colombia (Canada-Colombia Free Trade Agreement Implementation Act), Bill C-8: An Act to implement the Free Trade Agreement between Canada and the Hashemite Kingdom of Jordan, the Agreement on the Environment between Canada and the Hashemite Kingdom of Jordan and the Agreement on Labour Cooperation between Canada and the Hashemite Kingdom of Jordan (Canada-Jordan Free Trade Act) and Bill C-46: An Act to implement the Free Trade Agreement between Canada and the Republic of Panama, the Agreement on the Environment between Canada and the Republic of Panama and the Agreement on Labour Cooperation between Canada and the Republic of Panama (Canada-Panama Free Trade Act).

After the 2011 federal election, Richardson was one of eight members of Parliament who put their name forward to be the Speaker of the House of Commons. Richardson lasted to the fifth round and placed third.

== Resignation and post-parliamentary career ==
On May 30, 2012, Richardson resigned from Parliament to accept an appointment as principal secretary to the Premier of Alberta. In his farewell speech he remarked to his colleagues that: "While we advocate for different ideas of Canada, we are all Canadians and we all love our country. We would all, I think, do well to remember that and leave the partisan furies at the water's edge."

Ian MacDonald from the Montreal Gazette remarked that: "while leaders of all parties joined in personal tributes to Richardson, about 200 MPs lined up to shake his hand as he stood at his front-row seat by the door at the far end of the House. It was a good half-hour before he could leave the House. In four decades of attending the House, I’ve never seen anything quite like it." Similar sentiments were brought forward from the media noting Richardson's ability to be impartial to all sides in the House of Commons and in his riding office where he was willing to help all Calgarians.

Richardson left the federal Conservative party when he resigned in 2012. His protégé Greg McLean won his former Calgary Centre seat in the 2019 federal election. Richardson supported Mark Carney in the 2025 Liberal Party of Canada leadership election and helped him fundraise. Afterwards, Carney's team sought to recruit him to run for the Liberals in Calgary Centre for the 2025 federal election, which Richardson declined, citing his political retirement and support of McLean.

== Community involvement ==
Richardson served the Board of Southminster United Church; and continues to serve as a board member of the Calgary Homeless Foundation. He was Chair of the Advisory Board to the University of Calgary Institute for the Humanities and was on the faculty of the Banff Centre School of Management for ten years.

Richardson is on the Calgary Stampede Board of Directors and is a Calgary Flames Ambassador.

== Awards and recognition ==
Richardson received the Queen Elizabeth II Silver Jubilee Medal in 1977 "in recognition of significant contribution to compatriots, community and to Canada", the 125th Anniversary of the Confederation of Canada Medal in 1992, the Alberta Centennial Medal in 2005 "in recognition of outstanding service to the people and province of Alberta", and the Queen Elizabeth II Diamond Jubilee Medal in 2012 in recognition of his "contributions to Canada".

== Electoral record ==
=== Calgary Centre ===
2011 Canadian federal election
Party	Candidate	Votes	%	±%	Expenditures
Conservative	Lee Richardson	28,401	57.68	+2.08	$80,989.16
Liberal	Jennifer Pollock	8,631	17.53	-0.37	$52,961.24
New Democratic	Donna Marlis Montgomery	7,314	14.86	+5.85	$0.00
Green	William Hamilton	4,889	9.93	-6.64	$30,754.09
Total valid votes/Expense limit		49,235	100.00		$93,844.88
Total rejected ballots		261	0.53	–	
Turnout		49,496	55.41	–	
Eligible voters		89,322	–	–	
Conservative hold		Swing		+1.2	

2008 Canadian federal election
Party	Candidate	Votes	%	±%	Expenditures
Conservative	Lee Richardson	26,085	55.60	+0.19	$72,165
Liberal	Heesung Kim	8,402	17.90	-1.29	$34,321
Green	Natalie Odd	7,778	16.57	+4.89	$29,509
New Democratic	Tyler Kinch	4,229	9.01	-4.24	$9,881
Independent	Antony Grochowski	420	0.89	*	n/a
Total valid votes/Expense limit		46,914	100.00		$90,677
Total rejected ballots		228	0.48	-0.02	
Turnout		47,142	53.16	-8.86	
Conservative hold		Swing		+0.7	

2006 Canadian federal election
Party	Candidate	Votes	%	±%	Expenditures
Conservative	Lee Richardson	30,213	55.41	+4.26	$82,276
Liberal	Heesung Kim	10,464	19.19	-10.70	$36,623
New Democratic	Brian Pincott	7,227	13.25	+4.76	$8,689
Green	John Johnson	6,372	11.68	+176	$3,431
Canadian Action	Trevor Grover	259	0.45	-0.08	
Total valid votes		54,525	100.00		–
Total rejected ballots		275	0.50	+0.11	
Turnout		54,800	62.02	+4.48	
Conservative hold		Swing		+7.5	

=== Calgary South Centre ===
2004 Canadian federal election
Party	Candidate	Votes	%	±%	Expenditures
Conservative	Lee Richardson	26,192	51.15	-29.73	$78,167
Liberal	Julia Turnbull	15,305	29.89	+16.69	$71,037
Green	Phillip K. Liesemer	5,080	9.92	*	$1,898
New Democratic	Keith Purdy	4,350	8.49	+5.05	$4,667
Canadian Action	Trevor Grover	274	0.53	*	n/a
Total valid votes		51,201	100.00	6,041	–
Total rejected ballots		202	0.39	+0.02	
Turnout		51,403	57.54	+0.76	
Conservative hold		Swing		-23.21	

Results based on redistributed results. Conservative Party change is compared to a combination of Progressive Conservative Party and Canadian Alliance totals.

=== Calgary Southeast ===
1993 Canadian federal election
Party	Candidate	Votes	%	±%
Reform	Jan Brown	33,565	59.85	+47.02
Progressive Conservative	Lee Richardson	11,286	20.12	-42.54
Liberal	Quoi Nguyen	7,642	13.63	+3.39
New Democratic	Neale Smith	1,889	3.37	-9.82
National	Jocelyne Wandler	1,109	1.98	
Natural Law	Maureen Doram	444	0.79	
Canada Party	Peter Hope	148	0.26	
Total valid votes		56,083	100.00	

1988 Canadian federal election
Party	Candidate	Votes	%
Progressive Conservative	Lee Richardson	32,477	62.67
New Democratic	Kathy Miller	6,837	13.19
Reform	Gerry Maloney	6,648	12.83
Liberal	Dale Muti	5,305	10.24
Rhinoceros	Dave Wylie	299	0.58
Independent	Julie Northrup	77	0.15
Confederation of Regions	Douglas M. Cassidy	62	0.12
Independent	Jim Othen	62	0.12
Commonwealth of Canada	Eldon Warman	58	0.11
Total valid votes		51,825	100.00

== See also ==
- Canadian federal election results in Calgary
