= Alex Kindy =

Canadian politician

Alex Kindy, M.D. (January 8, 1930 – May 6, 2011) was a Canadian politician. Kindy was born in Lviv, at the time Poland.

His first attempt at entering federal politics was in the 1962 federal election when he ran as an "Independent Liberal" in the Quebec riding of Maisonneuve—Rosemont. He placed last out of five candidates (including the official Liberal candidate) and won 942 votes.

Kindy subsequently joined the Progressive Conservative party and attempted to win a seat from the Quebec riding of Sherbrooke running as "Alexandre Kindy" in the 1968, 1972 and 1974 elections, placing third on each attempt behind the Liberal and Social Credit candidates.

He subsequently moved to Alberta where he won the Tory nomination for Calgary East in the 1984 federal election and was elected to the House of Commons of Canada. He was re-elected in the 1988 federal election in what had become the riding of Calgary Northeast.

Kindy was known for his anti-Communist views, and opposed the prosecution of Ukrainians and Balts in Canada accused of perpetrating Nazi war crimes during World War II. He and a fellow Tory MP, Andrew Witer, attempted in 1987 to delay the passage of legislation designed to allow the prosecution of Nazi war criminals in Canada.

Kindy remained a backbench supporter of the Brian Mulroney government until 1990 when the government attempted to pass the Goods and Services Tax into legislation. Kindy and David Kilgour opposed the GST and voted against it in the House of Commons resulting in their expulsion from the Progressive Conservative caucus on April 10, 1990. Kindy continued to sit as a Progressive Conservative MP, though outside of caucus, until May 5, 1993, when he formally became an Independent. He ran for re-election as an independent candidate in the 1993 federal election, and although his stand against the GST was popular with his constituents, he was defeated, coming in fourth place behind Art Hanger of the Reform Party of Canada and the official Progressive Conservative candidate.

The publisher of Comrade J: The Untold Secrets of Russia's Master Spy in America after the End of the Cold War, a book which alleges Kindy was recruited as a spy for the Soviets, halted shipments of the book to Canada due to legal considerations. The book is based on recollections by Sergei Tretyakov, a Soviet spy in Ottawa.

Parliament of Canada
Preceded by John Kushner	Member of Parliament Calgary East; 1984-1988	Succeeded by Riding abolished
Preceded by New District	Member of Parliament Calgary Northeast; 1988-1993	Succeeded by Art Hanger
