= Tom Kmiec =

Canadian politician (born 1981)

Tom Kmiec MP
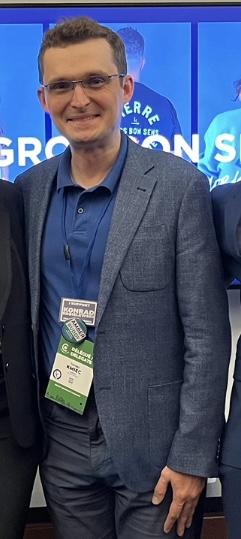
- Tom Kimec at the 2023 Conservative Convention

Deputy Speaker of the House of Commons
- Incumbent
- Assumed office May 28, 2025
- Preceded by: Chris d'Entremont

Conservative Party National Caucus Chair
- In office November 6, 2019 – August 15, 2021
- Leader: Andrew Scheer; Erin O'Toole
- Preceded by: David Sweet
- Succeeded by: Scott Reid

Member of Parliament for Calgary Shepard
- Incumbent
- Assumed office October 19, 2015
- Preceded by: Constituency established

Personal details
- Born: July 31, 1981 (age 45) Gdańsk, Poland
- Party: Conservative
- Children: 4
- Education: Concordia University (BA); Regent University (MA)

Tomasz Kmiec MP (/kəˈmɪtʃ/ kə-MICH; born July 31, 1981) is a Polish-Canadian politician who has served as the deputy speaker of the House of Commons since 2025 and has been the Member of Parliament for Calgary Shepard in the House of Commons of Canada under the Conservative Party of Canada, first elected in 2015.

== Early life and education ==
Tom Kmiec was born in Gdańsk, Poland. His family immigrated to Canada and settled in Quebec. Kmiec was raised in Quebec and went through the French education system as part of the Bill 101 reforms. He is fluently bilingual in both of Canada's official languages. In 2005, he moved to Calgary. He is raising his three children: Maximillian, Jolie, and Enoch.

Kmiec graduated from Concordia University in Montreal with a bachelor's degree in Political Science. He then received his master's degree in American Government with a concentration in Terrorism and Homeland Security from Regent University in Virginia Beach, Virginia, USA.

== Career ==
Kmiec started his career as an intern in the office of then Leader of Her Majesty's Loyal Opposition, Stephen Harper. Kmiec has since worked for cabinet ministers federally and provincially in Alberta.

Prior to being elected as the MP for Calgary Shepard, Kmiec was the manager of policy and research with the Calgary Chamber of Commerce and worked for the Human Resources Institute of Alberta. This work received national coverage in the Globe and Mail and Maclean's magazine.

Kmiec was elected in the 2015 Canadian federal election for the riding of Calgary Shepard. Kmiec has served on the Joint Committee for the Scrutiny of Regulations, the Foreign Affairs and International Development Committee, and the Finance Committee. The latter two represent the most senior committees in Parliament.

On September 18, 2017, Kmiec was moved from his role as Deputy Shadow Minister for Foreign Affairs to the Deputy Shadow Minister for Finance. In this role, Kmiec was a strong voice for lower taxes, financial responsibility, and housing affordability.

Kmiec was named deputy critic for foreign affairs for the Conservative Party of Canada on October 16, 2016, in a shadow cabinet shuffle by Interim Conservative Leader Rona Ambrose.

On December 2, 2021, Kmiec was elected as Chair of Public Accounts Committee.

Under Candice Bergen, former Interim Conservative Leader (February 2022 – September 2022), Kmiec was named Deputy House Leader, Co-Chair of Question Period Planning and Shadow Minister of Democratic Reform.

== Social issues ==
In 2016, Tom Kmiec was in agreement with the change to O Canada, however, after polling his riding, he voted in line with his constituents. 87% opposed the change to gender neutral.

=== Abortion ===
Kmiec voted in support of Bill C-233 – An Act to amend the Criminal Code (sex-selective abortion), which would make it a criminal offence for a medical practitioner to perform an abortion knowing that the abortion is sought solely on the grounds of the child's sex. Kmiec has been identified by Abortion Rights Coalition of Canada as a Member of Parliament with an anti-abortion stance.

=== Bereavement leave ===
On November 22, 2021, Kmiec tabled Bill C-211, An Act to amend the Canada Labour Code (bereavement leave), which would have expanded unpaid bereavement leave for parents. A month after tabling the bill, a deal was struck between Labour Minister Seamus O'Reagan and Conservative labour critic Scott Aitchison to add parts of Bill C-211 into Liberal Bill C-3. Bill C-3, with the amendments from Bill C-211, received royal assent on December 17, 2021.

=== Conversion therapy ===
On June 22, 2021, Kmiec was one of 63 MPs to vote against Bill C-6 An Act to amend the Criminal Code (conversion therapy). In October 2020, Tom Kmiec published a statement regarding the contents of Bill C-6. This bill was passed by majority vote and made certain aspects of conversion therapy a crime, including "causing a child to undergo conversion therapy."

== Economic issues ==
In the fall of 2016, Kmiec helped start the Alberta Jobs Taskforce in response to the growing energy jobs crisis in Alberta after unemployment reached 200,000

On April 18, 2018, Kmiec moved a motion at Parliament's finance committee asking to set aside 4 meetings to understand the impact of the Trans Mountain Expansion pipeline cancellation on Canada's economy and consider whether the federal government should use its constitutional powers to ensure that the pipeline is built. The Liberal MPs on the committee rejected the motion.

Kmiec has been vocal in questioning the Liberal government's mortgage lending rules and increases to mortgage insurance fees charged by the Canada Mortgage and Housing Corporation (CMHC).

Kmiec has repeatedly called for a full parliamentary review of the B-20 Mortgage Stress Test, that was introduced by the Liberal government in January 2018. He has published a series of articles on the topic and has moved two motions at Parliament's finance committee asking for a study of the mortgage lending rules. The Mortgage Stress Test is estimated to have prevented 100,000 Canadians from purchasing a home, slowed mortgage growth by nearly 12 percent, and will delete some 200,000 jobs from the economy by 2021.

== Foreign issues ==
In response to the religious persecution of Montagnards highlanders who practice De Ga Protestantism and Ha Mon Catholicism in Vietnam, Kmiec tabled a petition calling upon the Government of Canada to demand that the Vietnamese government stop its abusive policies against these groups. The petition further demanded that future trade agreements with Vietnam would be contingent on their adherence to the UN Universal Declaration of Human Rights and that under the Sergei Magnitsky Act, sanctions would be applied against Colonel Vu Van Lau and Senior Lt. Colonel Pham Huu Truong.

Kmiec is also an advocate for Canada to support the minority Uyghur population in China's Xinjiang region, who are being targeted for their religious beliefs and detained in internment camps. In May 2019, Kmiec questioned the Canada Pension Plan Investment Board regarding their investments in two Chinese companies — Hangzhou Hikvision Digital Technology Co. Ltd. and Zhejiang Dahua Technology Co. Ltd. — that are involved in the manufacturing of surveillance equipment used to repress Uyghurs in Western China. Kmiec has urged the CPPIB to divest their holdings in these companies.

Kmiec supported Canada's Justice for Victims of Corrupt Foreign Officials Act, created in response to the death lawyer Sergei Magnitsky, who was beaten to death in Russian custody.

Kmiec created the "Parliamentary Friends of the Kurds", a parliamentary group aimed at establishing dialogue between Canadian and Kurdish lawmakers and fostering positive relations between Canada and the Kurdistan Region. Kmiec, along with NDP MP Gord Johns and fellow Conservative MP Michael Cooper traveled to Washington, D.C., in March 2016 to meet with officials from the Kurdistan Regional Government.

Kmiec was the first Parliamentarian to unearth the Liberal government's $256 million pledge to the China-controlled Asian Infrastructure Investment Bank (AIIB), which was hidden inside the Liberal government's 2017 omnibus budget, Bill C-63.

Kmiec criticized the Liberals’ decision to gift $256 million to the AIIB, which is funding the construction of three new energy pipelines in Asia while the Liberal government opposes and stalls the construction of energy pipelines in Canada. Kmiec called on the Liberal government to cancel Canada's participation in the AIIB through a series of motions at parliament's finance committee, but the Liberal MPs on the committee voted down the motions.

== Personal life ==
On August 13, 2018, Kmiec's daughter, Lucy-Rose Evangeline Winfield Kmiec, died 39 days after her birth. Lucy-Rose was born with Trisomy 13, a rare chromosomal disorder also known as Patau Syndrome. Following her death, Kmiec shared an emotional tribute to his daughter in the House of Commons. “Her short life was energetic and eventful. It has made me realize that life is much more than prizes, certificates and public recognition. Her great success is the incredible warmth she brought to my family and how she's been able to mature her older siblings into responsible caretakers without a spoken word” Kmiec stated.

Kmiec holds Dual-citizenship with Poland.

== Electoral record ==
2025 Canadian federal election: Calgary Shepard
Party	Candidate	Votes	%	±%	Expenditures
Conservative	Tom Kmiec	44,363	67.99	+6.79	$64,954.09
Liberal	Gul Khan	18,421	28.23	+14.31	$19,103.62
New Democratic	Tory Tomblin	1,780	2.73	–13.30	$22.50
People's	Donald Legere	383	0.59	–5.14	$140.32
Green	Robert Frasch	302	0.46	–1.24	none listed
Total valid votes/expense limit		65,249	99.55	–	$135,545.23
Total rejected ballots		294	0.45	–0.11	
Turnout		65,543	71.97	+7.96	
Eligible voters		91,069			
Conservative notional hold		Swing		–3.76	
Source: Elections Canada

2021 Canadian federal election: Calgary Shepard
Party	Candidate	Votes	%	±%	Expenditures
Conservative	Tom Kmiec	44,411	60.37	–14.64	$47,284.36
New Democratic	Raj Jessel	12,103	16.45	+7.71	none listed
Liberal	Cam Macdonald	10,303	14.01	+2.95	$2,027.58
People's	Ron Vaillant	4,284	5.82	+3.63	$7,189.88
Green	Evelyn Tanaka	1,300	1.77	–1.23	$3,056.27
Maverick	Andrea Lee	874	1.19	–	$752.21
Independent	Konstantine Muirhead	228	0.31	–	none listed
National Citizens Alliance	Jesse Halmo	56	0.08	–	$276.36
Total valid votes/expense limit		73,559	99.44	–	$139,111.83
Total rejected ballots		416	0.56	+0.00	
Turnout		73,975	64.01	–5.74	
Eligible voters		115,565			
Conservative hold		Swing		–11.18	
Source: Elections Canada

2019 Canadian federal election: Calgary Shepard
Party	Candidate	Votes	%	±%	Expenditures
Conservative	Tom Kmiec	58,614	75.01	+9.14	$42,824.82
Liberal	Del Arnold	8,644	11.06	–13.63	$13,154.34
New Democratic	David Brian Smith	6,828	8.74	+1.91	none listed
Green	Evelyn Tanaka	2,345	3.00	+0.39	$3,079.74
People's	Kyle Scott	1,709	2.19	–	$24,324.77
Total valid votes/expense limit		78,140	99.44	–	$132,659.53
Total rejected ballots		441	0.56	+0.25	
Turnout		78,581	69.75	+1.89	
Eligible voters		112,660			
Conservative hold		Swing		+11.39	
Source: Elections Canada

2015 Canadian federal election: Calgary Shepard
Party	Candidate	Votes	%	±%	Expenditures
Conservative	Tom Kmiec	43,706	65.87	–9.64	$153,176.93
Liberal	Jerome James	16,379	24.69	+17.50	$7,037.44
New Democratic	Dany Allard	4,532	6.83	–4.30	$10,097.24
Green	Graham MacKenzie	1,734	2.61	–2.95	$1,050.00
Total valid votes/expense limit		66,351	99.69	–	$241,369.87
Total rejected ballots		208	0.31	–	
Turnout		66,559	67.86	–	
Eligible voters		98,085			
Conservative hold		Swing		–13.57	
Source: Elections Canada
