= Art Hanger =

Canadian politician (born 1943)

Arthur Hanger MP

Member of Parliament for Calgary Northeast
- In office October 25, 1993 – October 14, 2008
- Preceded by: Alex Kindy
- Succeeded by: Devinder Shory

Chair of the Standing Committee on Justice
- In office May 4, 2006 – February 2, 2009
- Minister: Vic Toews; Rob Nicholson
- Preceded by: John Maloney
- Succeeded by: Ed Fast

Personal details
- Born: February 19, 1943 (age 83) Three Hills, Alberta, Canada
- Party: Conservative
- Other political affiliations: Republican (2025-present); Reform (1993–2000); Canadian Alliance (2000–2001, 2001–2003); Independent (2001)
- Spouse: Margaret Maerz
- Profession: police officer

Arthur Hanger (born February 19, 1943) is a Canadian politician.

Hanger is a former member of the Conservative Party of Canada in the House of Commons of Canada, having represented the riding of Calgary Northeast from 1993 until his retirement in 2008. He was elected as a member of the Reform Party of Canada (1993–2000) and the Canadian Alliance (2000–2003) before the present-day Conservatives were re-formed. Born in Three Hills, Alberta, Hanger is a former officer of the Calgary Police Service.

Hanger became the Vice President for Policy of the Republican Party of Alberta, advocating for Alberta independence.

== Early political career ==
Hanger came to the House of Commons when he won the largest plurality of votes in Calgary Northeast in the 1993 Canadian federal election. He was seen as one of the more radical members of the Reform Party, with these views culminating in March 1996 when he announced that he supported corporal punishment and had booked a trip to Singapore to investigate its use of caning in deterring crime. After public outcry and criticism from within the party, the trip was cancelled.

Hanger was the Official Opposition critic for Citizenship and Immigration (2001–2004), with special responsibility for Foreign Credentials (2004). He was a former Chief Official Opposition critic for National Defence (1997–2001) and Opposition critic for the Solicitor General (1995–1997).

He was vice-chair of the Standing Committee on Citizenship and Immigration in the 38th Parliament, and vice chair of the Standing Committee on National Defence and Veterans Affairs in the 36th Parliament. He served as a member of various other Parliamentary committees during his career as an MP.

In the summer of 2001, Hanger was the first Alliance MP to be suspended from caucus for criticizing the leadership of Stockwell Day. However, he did not become a member of the Democratic Representative Caucus, as he accepted the September 10, 2001, reinstatement offer that was made to all the dissident MPs.

On March 31, 2004, he was the only Conservative MP in the House of Commons to join with 18 Bloc Québécois MPs to vote against the referral of the Older Adult Justice Act to the Standing Committee on Justice. The move was in contrast to the support the bill garnered from virtually all members of his own party, as well as the governing Liberals and the New Democratic Party. Hanger provided no comment about why he voted against this law.

== Chair of Standing Committee on Justice and Human Rights ==
During the first two sessions of the 39th Parliament he served as chair of the Standing Committee on Justice and Human Rights, and also chaired the Subcommittee on Agenda and Procedure of the Standing Committee on Justice and Human Rights.

Hanger announced on October 10, 2007, that he would retire at the next election, which was held in 2008.
