= Calgary Shepard =

Federal electoral district in Alberta, Canada

Alberta electoral district
- Interactive map of riding boundaries from the 2025 federal election

Federal electoral district
- Legislature: House of Commons
MP
Tom Kmiec
Conservative
- District created: 2013
- First contested: 2015
- Last contested: 2021
- District webpage: profile, map

Demographics
- Population (2011): 110,296
- Electors (2019): 111,936
- Area (km²): 186
- Pop. density (per km²): 593
- Census division: Division No. 6
- Census subdivision: Calgary (part)

Calgary Shepard is a federal electoral district in Alberta, Canada, that has been represented in the House of Commons of Canada since 2015.

Calgary Shepard was created by the 2012 federal electoral boundaries redistribution and was legally defined in the 2013 representation order. It came into effect upon the call of the 42nd Canadian federal election, scheduled for October 2015. It was created out of parts of the electoral districts of Calgary East and Calgary Southeast. The riding's name refers to Shepard, Alberta.

== Demographics ==
According to the 2016 Canadian census

- Languages: (2016) 77.7% English, 3.6% Tagalog, 2.3% Spanish, 1.6% French, 1.4% Vietnamese, 1.1% Mandarin, 0.9% Cantonese, 0.8% Panjabi, 0.8% Russian, 0.8% Arabic, 0.8% Polish, 0.6% German, 0.6% Urdu, 0.5% Romanian

Panethnic groups in Calgary Shepard (2011−2021)
Panethnic group	2021		2016		2011	
Panethnic group	Pop.	%	Pop.	%	Pop.	%
European (Note: Statistic includes all persons that did not make up part of a visible minority or an indigenous identity.)	107,835	66.17%	105,145	71.68%	84,770	77.32%
Southeast Asian (Note: Statistic includes total responses of "Filipino" and "Southeast Asian" under visible minority section on census.)	16,700	10.25%	12,405	8.46%	8,360	7.63%
South Asian	9,080	5.57%	6,520	4.45%	3,370	3.07%
East Asian (Note: Statistic includes total responses of "Chinese", "Korean", and "Japanese" under visible minority section on census.)	6,415	3.94%	5,415	3.69%	2,880	2.63%
Indigenous	6,270	3.85%	5,210	3.55%	3,635	3.32%
African	6,100	3.74%	4,415	3.01%	2,270	2.07%
Latin American	4,830	2.96%	3,245	2.21%	1,830	1.67%
Middle Eastern (Note: Statistic includes total responses of "West Asian" and "Arab" under visible minority section on census.)	3,160	1.94%	2,250	1.53%	1,220	1.11%
Other/Multiracial (Note: Statistic includes total responses of "Visible minority, n.i.e." and "Multiple visible minorities" under visible minority section on census.)	2,560	1.57%	2,070	1.41%	1,295	1.18%
Total responses	162,965	99.71%	146,680	99.43%	109,630	99.33%
Total population	163,447	100%	147,520	100%	110,364	100%
Notes: Totals greater than 100% due to multiple origin responses. Demographics based on 2012 Canadian federal electoral redistribution riding boundaries.

== Members of Parliament ==
This riding has elected the following members of the House of Commons of Canada:

Parliament	Years	Member	Party
Calgary Shepard; Riding created from Calgary East and Calgary Southeast
42nd	2015–2019	Tom Kmiec	Conservative
43rd	2019–2021	Tom Kmiec	Conservative
44th	2021–2025	Tom Kmiec	Conservative
45th	2025–present	Tom Kmiec	Conservative

== Election results ==
View source data.
Graph of election results in Calgary Shepard (minor parties that never got 2% of the vote or didn't run consistently are omitted)

=== 2023 representation order ===
2025 Canadian federal election
Party	Candidate	Votes	%	±%	Expenditures
Conservative	Tom Kmiec	44,363	67.99	+6.79	$64,954.09
Liberal	Gul Khan	18,421	28.23	+14.31	$19,103.62
New Democratic	Tory Tomblin	1,780	2.73	–13.30	$22.50
People's	Donald Legere	383	0.59	–5.14	$140.32
Green	Robert Frasch	302	0.46	–1.24	none listed
Total valid votes/expense limit		65,249	99.55	–	$135,545.23
Total rejected ballots		294	0.45	–0.11	
Turnout		65,543	71.97	+7.96	
Eligible voters		91,069			
Conservative notional hold		Swing		–3.76	
Source: Elections Canada

2021 federal election redistributed results
Party	Vote	%
Conservative	30,941	61.20
New Democratic	8,105	16.03
Liberal	7,039	13.92
People's	2,897	5.73
Green	857	1.70
Others	716	1.40

=== 2013 representation order ===
2021 Canadian federal election
Party	Candidate	Votes	%	±%	Expenditures
Conservative	Tom Kmiec	44,411	60.37	–14.64	$47,284.36
New Democratic	Raj Jessel	12,103	16.45	+7.71	none listed
Liberal	Cam Macdonald	10,303	14.01	+2.95	$2,027.58
People's	Ron Vaillant	4,284	5.82	+3.63	$7,189.88
Green	Evelyn Tanaka	1,300	1.77	–1.23	$3,056.27
Maverick	Andrea Lee	874	1.19	–	$752.21
Independent	Konstantine Muirhead	228	0.31	–	none listed
National Citizens Alliance	Jesse Halmo	56	0.08	–	$276.36
Total valid votes/expense limit		73,559	99.44	–	$139,111.83
Total rejected ballots		416	0.56	+0.00	
Turnout		73,975	64.01	–5.74	
Eligible voters		115,565			
Conservative hold		Swing		–11.18	
Source: Elections Canada

2019 Canadian federal election
Party	Candidate	Votes	%	±%	Expenditures
Conservative	Tom Kmiec	58,614	75.01	+9.14	$42,824.82
Liberal	Del Arnold	8,644	11.06	–13.63	$13,154.34
New Democratic	David Brian Smith	6,828	8.74	+1.91	none listed
Green	Evelyn Tanaka	2,345	3.00	+0.39	$3,079.74
People's	Kyle Scott	1,709	2.19	–	$24,324.77
Total valid votes/expense limit		78,140	99.44	–	$132,659.53
Total rejected ballots		441	0.56	+0.25	
Turnout		78,581	69.75	+1.89	
Eligible voters		112,660			
Conservative hold		Swing		+11.39	
Source: Elections Canada

2015 Canadian federal election
Party	Candidate	Votes	%	±%	Expenditures
Conservative	Tom Kmiec	43,706	65.87	–9.64	$153,176.93
Liberal	Jerome James	16,379	24.69	+17.50	$7,037.44
New Democratic	Dany Allard	4,532	6.83	–4.30	$10,097.24
Green	Graham MacKenzie	1,734	2.61	–2.95	$1,050.00
Total valid votes/expense limit		66,351	99.69	–	$241,369.87
Total rejected ballots		208	0.31	–	
Turnout		66,559	67.86	–	
Eligible voters		98,085			
Conservative hold		Swing		–13.57	
Source: Elections Canada

2011 federal election redistributed results
Party	Vote	%
Conservative	29,904	75.52
New Democratic	4,407	11.13
Liberal	2,846	7.19
Green	2,202	5.56
Others	241	0.61

== See also ==
- List of Canadian electoral districts
- Historical federal electoral districts of Canada
