= Calgary Southeast =

Former federal electoral district in Alberta, Canada

Coordinates: 50.95°N 113.97°W

Alberta electoral district
- Calgary Southeast in relation to the other Calgary ridings

Defunct federal electoral district
- Legislature: House of Commons
- District created: 1986
- District abolished: 2013
- First contested: 1988
- Last contested: 2011

Demographics
- Population (2011): 152,929
- Electors (2011): 104,604
- Area (km²): 115.50
- Census division: Division No. 6
- Census subdivision: Calgary

Calgary Southeast was a federal electoral district in Alberta, Canada, that was represented in the House of Commons of Canada from 1988 to 2015. The district was in the southeast part of the city of Calgary. It was bounded by the city limits to the south and east.

== History ==
The electoral district was created in 1987 from the ridings of Calgary East, Bow River and Calgary South, all of which were disestablished. In 1996, parts were transferred from this electoral district to Calgary East, a riding that was re-established.

=== Historical boundaries ===
1987 representation order

1996 representation order

2003 representation order

=== Members of Parliament ===
This riding has elected the following members of Parliament:

Parliament	Years	Member	Party
Calgary Southeast; Riding created from Calgary East, Bow River and Calgary South
34th	1988–1993	Lee Richardson	Progressive Conservative
35th	1993–1996	Jan Brown	Reform
35th	1996–1996	Jan Brown	Independent Reform
35th	1996–1997	Jan Brown	Independent
36th	1997–2000	Jason Kenney	Reform
36th	2000–2000	Jason Kenney	Alliance
37th	2000–2003	Jason Kenney	Alliance
37th	2003–2004	Jason Kenney	Conservative
38th	2004–2006	Jason Kenney	Conservative
39th	2006–2008	Jason Kenney	Conservative
40th	2008–2011	Jason Kenney	Conservative
41st	2011–2015	Jason Kenney	Conservative
Riding dissolved into Calgary Shepard and Calgary Midnapore

== Election results ==
=== 2011 ===
2011 Canadian federal election
Party	Candidate	Votes	%	±%	Expenditures
Conservative	Jason Kenney	48,173	76.26	+2.37	$54,059.36
New Democratic	Kirk Oates	6,482	10.26	+3.08	$4.95
Green	Brett Spencer	4,079	6.46	–3.77	$5,549.29
Liberal	Brian N. MacPhee	4,020	6.36	–2.34	$11,151.41
Independent	Antony Tony Grochowski	225	0.36	–	none listed
Western Block	Paul Fromm	193	0.31	–	$5,311.64
Total valid votes/expense limit		63,172	99.80	–	$104,090.70
Total rejected ballots		129	0.20	–0.05	
Turnout		63,301	59.47	+2.32	
Eligible voters		106,439			
Conservative hold		Swing		+2.73	
Source: Elections Canada

=== 2008 ===
2008 Canadian federal election
Party	Candidate	Votes	%	±%	Expenditures
Conservative	Jason Kenney	41,425	73.89	–1.29	$39,932.02
Green	Margaret Chandler	5,736	10.23	+3.42	$3,729.01
Liberal	Brad Carroll	4,878	8.70	–1.65	none listed
New Democratic	Chris Willott	4,024	7.18	–0.48	$5,071.69
Total valid votes/expense limit		56,063	99.75	–	$96,650.13
Total rejected ballots		138	0.25	+0.05	
Turnout		56,201	57.15	–9.93	
Eligible voters		98,343			
Conservative hold		Swing		–2.36	
Source: Elections Canada

=== 2006 ===
2006 Canadian federal election
Party	Candidate	Votes	%	±%	Expenditures
Conservative	Jason Kenney	44,987	75.18	+4.18	$44,728.45
Liberal	James Ludwar	6,193	10.35	–6.01	$9,186.79
New Democratic	Eric Leavitt	4,584	7.66	+1.07	$2,808.82
Green	Gus Gutoski	4,076	6.81	+0.76	$1,535.68
Total valid votes/expense limit		59,840	99.80	–	$85,585.29
Total rejected ballots		120	0.20	–0.03	
Turnout		59,960	67.08	+3.36	
Eligible voters		89,391			
Conservative hold		Swing		+5.10	
Source: Elections Canada

=== 2004 ===
2004 Canadian federal election
Party	Candidate	Votes	%	±%	Expenditures
Conservative	Jason Kenney	36,843	71.00	–13.07	$48,221.61
Liberal	Jim Tanner	8,488	16.36	+4.17	$23,017.09
New Democratic	Brian Pincott	3,419	6.59	+4.55	$2,386.65
Green	George Read	3,142	6.05	+4.34	$1,193.22
Total valid votes/expense limit		51,892	99.77	–	$78,854.05
Total rejected ballots		119	0.23	+0.02	
Turnout		52,011	63.72	–0.17	
Eligible voters		81,621			
Conservative gain from Alliance		Swing		–8.62	
Source: Elections Canada

=== 2000 ===
2000 Canadian federal election
Party	Candidate	Votes	%	±%	Expenditures
Alliance	Jason Kenney	34,492	63.25	+8.23	$41,614
Progressive Conservative	Ray Clark	11,353	20.82	–1.81	$9,884
Liberal	Dana Peace	6,646	12.19	–6.00	$18,677
New Democratic	Giorgio Cattabeni	1,111	2.04	–0.59	$490
Green	James Stephen Kohut	931	1.71	–	none listed
Total valid votes		54,533	99.79		
Total rejected ballots		116	0.21	+0.03	
Turnout		54,649	63.89	+0.20	
Eligible voters		85,536			
Alliance gain from Reform		Swing		+14.53	
Source: Elections Canada

=== 1997 ===
1997 Canadian federal election
Party	Candidate	Votes	%	±%	Expenditures
Reform	Jason Kenney	24,602	55.02	–4.83	$54,180
Progressive Conservative	Carol Kraychy	10,567	23.63	+3.50	$60,861
Liberal	Patti-Anne Kay	8,131	18.19	+4.56	$43,986
New Democratic	Jason Ness	1,176	2.63	–0.74	$524
Natural Law	Neeraj Varma	235	0.53	–0.26	none listed
Total valid votes		44,711	99.82		
Total rejected ballots		79	0.18	–0.13	
Turnout		44,790	63.69	–1.40	
Eligible voters		70,327			
Reform hold		Swing		–4.17	
Source: Elections Canada

=== 1993 ===
1993 Canadian federal election
Party	Candidate	Votes	%	±%
Reform	Jan Brown	33,564	59.85	+47.02
Progressive Conservative	Lee Richardson	11,287	20.13	–42.54
Liberal	Quoi Nguyen	7,642	13.63	+3.39
New Democratic	Neale Smith	1,888	3.37	–9.82
National	Jocelyne Wandler	1,111	1.98	–
Natural Law	Maureen Doram	443	0.79	–
Canada Party	Peter Hope	148	0.26	–
Total valid votes		56,083	99.69	
Total rejected ballots		172	0.31	+0.08
Turnout		56,255	65.09	–9.05
Eligible voters		86,430		
Reform gain from Progressive Conservative		Swing		+44.78
Source: Elections Canada

=== 1988 ===
1988 Canadian federal election
Party	Candidate	Votes	%	±%
Progressive Conservative	Lee Richardson	32,477	62.67	–
New Democratic	Kathy Miller	6,837	13.19	–
Reform	Gerry Maloney	6,648	12.83	–
Liberal	Dale Muti	5,305	10.24	–
Rhinoceros	Dave Wylie	299	0.58	–
Independent	Julie Northrup	77	0.15	–
Confederation of Regions	Douglas M. Cassidy	62	0.12	–
Independent	Jim Othen	62	0.12	–
Commonwealth of Canada	Eldon Warman	58	0.11	–
Total valid votes		51,825	99.77	
Total rejected ballots		122	0.23	–
Turnout		51,947	74.14	–
Eligible voters		70,062		
Progressive Conservative notional hold		Swing		N/A
Source: Elections Canada

== See also ==
- List of Canadian electoral districts
- Historical federal electoral districts of Canada
