= Calgary Northeast =

Former federal electoral district in Alberta, Canada

Coordinates: 51.11°N 113.99°W

Alberta electoral district
- Calgary Northeast in relation to the other Calgary ridings

Defunct federal electoral district
- Legislature: House of Commons
- District created: 1987
- District abolished: 2013
- First contested: 1988
- Last contested: 2011
- District webpage: profile, map

Demographics
- Population (2011): 150,003
- Electors (2011): 85,510
- Area (km²): 125.95
- Census division: Division No. 6
- Census subdivision: Calgary

Calgary Northeast was a federal electoral district in Alberta, Canada, that was represented in the House of Commons of Canada from 1988 to 2015. It was an urban riding in the city of Calgary.

== History ==
This riding was created in 1987 from territory that had been in the ridings of Calgary East and Bow River, which were abolished. In 2003, parts of this electoral district were transferred to the new Calgary Centre-North riding.

The riding was abolished in 2013. The bulk of the riding became Calgary Skyview, while a small portion was transferred to Calgary Forest Lawn, which largely replaced Calgary East.

=== Historical boundaries ===
1987 representation order

1996 representation order

2003 representation order

=== Members of Parliament ===
This riding elected the following members of the House of Commons of Canada:

Calgary Northeast
Parliament	Years	Member	Party
Riding created from Calgary East and Bow River
34th	1988–1993	Alex Kindy	Progressive Conservative
34th	1993–1993	Alex Kindy	Independent
35th	1993–1997	Art Hanger	Reform
36th	1997–2000	Art Hanger	Reform
36th	2000–2000	Art Hanger	Alliance
37th	2000–2003	Art Hanger	Alliance
37th	2003–2004	Art Hanger	Conservative
38th	2004–2006	Art Hanger	Conservative
39th	2006–2008	Art Hanger	Conservative
40th	2008–2011	Devinder Shory	Conservative
41st	2011–2015	Devinder Shory	Conservative
Riding dissolved into Calgary Skyview and Calgary Forest Lawn

== Election results ==
=== 2011 ===
2011 Canadian federal election
Party	Candidate	Votes	%	±%	Expenditures
Conservative	Devinder Shory	23,550	56.80	+5.28	$85,015.29
Liberal	Cam Stewart	11,487	27.71	+7.47	$76,442.56
New Democratic	Colette Singh	4,262	10.28	+1.35	none listed
Green	Sheila Brown-Eckersley	1,953	4.71	–0.86	$1,086.04
Marxist–Leninist	Daniel Blanchard	206	0.50	–0.07	none listed
Total valid votes/expense limit		41,458	99.34	–	$91,804.86
Total rejected ballots		274	0.66	+0.06	
Turnout		41,732	47.80	+3.41	
Eligible voters		87,307			
Conservative hold		Swing		+6.38	
Source: Elections Canada

=== 2008 ===
2008 Canadian federal election
Party	Candidate	Votes	%	±%	Expenditures
Conservative	Devinder Shory	18,917	51.52	–13.34	$68,733.71
Liberal	Sanam S. Kang	7,433	20.24	–1.82	$85,401.07
Independent	Roger Richard	4,836	13.17	–	$60,171.82
New Democratic	Vinay Dey	3,279	8.93	+1.09	$10,828.89
Green	Abeed Monty Ahmad	2,045	5.57	+1.19	$25.00
Marxist–Leninist	Daniel Blanchard	211	0.57	–	none listed
Total valid votes/expense limit		36,721	99.41	–	$87,091.21
Total rejected ballots		219	0.59	+0.10	
Turnout		36,940	44.39	–7.74	
Eligible voters		83,214			
Conservative hold		Swing		–7.58	
Source: Elections Canada

=== 2006 ===
2006 Canadian federal election
Party	Candidate	Votes	%	±%	Expenditures
Conservative	Art Hanger	27,169	64.86	+2.62	$60,428.64
Liberal	Jaswinder S. Johal	9,241	22.06	–2.56	$45,840.85
New Democratic	Tyler Ragan	3,284	7.84	+0.23	$2,663.53
Green	Trung Nguyen	1,833	4.38	–0.33	none listed
Independent	Ron Sanderson	364	0.87	–	$700.00
Total valid votes/expense limit		41,891	99.51	–	$80,615.75
Total rejected ballots		208	0.49	–0.01	
Turnout		42,099	52.13	+4.33	
Eligible voters		80,760			
Conservative hold		Swing		+0.03	
Source: Elections Canada

=== 2004 ===
2004 Canadian federal election
Party	Candidate	Votes	%	±%	Expenditures
Conservative	Art Hanger	21,924	62.24	–11.87	$61,446.84
Liberal	Dale Muti	8,672	24.62	+2.83	$40,580.55
New Democratic	Giorgio Cattabeni	2,682	7.61	+3.51	$1,404.80
Green	Morgan DuFord	1,658	4.71	–	$501.86
Canadian Action	Steve Garland	291	0.83	–	$1,234.80
Total valid votes/expense limit		35,227	99.49	–	$74,966.78
Total rejected ballots		180	0.51	–0.16	
Turnout		35,407	47.80	–2.78	
Eligible voters		74,070			
Conservative notional hold		Swing		–4.52	
Source: Elections Canada

=== 2000 ===
2000 Canadian federal election
Party	Candidate	Votes	%	±%	Expenditures
Alliance	Art Hanger	28,242	62.54	+10.43	$69,998
Liberal	Sam Keshavjee	9,841	21.79	–2.28	$46,501
Progressive Conservative	Jerry Vague	5,222	11.56	–4.63	none listed
New Democratic	H. Ken Sahil	1,852	4.10	+0.73	$1,509
Total valid votes		45,157	99.33		
Total rejected ballots		306	0.67	+0.43	
Turnout		45,463	50.58	–0.28	
Eligible voters		89,878			
Alliance notional hold		Swing		+6.36	
Source: Elections Canada

=== 1997 ===
1997 Canadian federal election
Party	Candidate	Votes	%	±%	Expenditures
Reform	Art Hanger	18,719	52.11	+7.76	$63,343
Liberal	John Phillips	8,646	24.07	–8.25	$26,784
Progressive Conservative	Suzanne Sawyer	5,815	16.19	+4.93	$16,104
Independent	Harry Sekhon	1,300	3.62	–	$25,901
New Democratic	Bruce Potter	1,209	3.37	+0.55	$413
Natural Law	Bruce Hansen	231	0.64	+0.26	none listed
Total valid votes		35,920	99.76		
Total rejected ballots		88	0.24	–0.12	
Turnout		36,008	50.87	–7.67	
Eligible voters		70,789			
Reform hold		Swing		+8.00	
Source: Elections Canada

=== 1993 ===
1993 Canadian federal election
Party	Candidate	Votes	%	±%
Reform	Art Hanger	20,602	44.35	+31.34
Liberal	Colin MacDonald	15,011	32.32	+16.13
Progressive Conservative	David Aftergood	5,229	11.26	–43.45
Independent	Alex Kindy	3,136	6.75	–
New Democratic	Ken Richmond	1,310	2.82	–12.65
National	Ray McLeod	853	1.84	–
Natural Law	Neeraj Varma	175	0.38	–
Green	Norm Norcross	134	0.29	–
Total valid votes		46,450	99.64	
Total rejected ballots		166	0.36	+0.08
Turnout		46,616	58.54	–12.22
Eligible voters		79,632		
Reform gain from Progressive Conservative		Swing		+23.74
Source: Elections Canada

=== 1988 ===
1988 Canadian federal election
Party	Candidate	Votes	%	±%
Progressive Conservative	Alex Kindy	25,890	54.71	–
Liberal	Anil Giga	7,663	16.19	–
New Democratic	Ken Richmond	7,319	15.47	–
Reform	Stewart Larsen	6,155	13.01	–
Independent	Jimmy Carleton	296	0.63	–
Total valid votes		47,323	99.72	
Total rejected ballots		132	0.28	–
Turnout		47,455	70.76	–
Eligible voters		67,065		
Progressive Conservative hold		Swing		N/A
Source: Elections Canada

== See also ==
- List of Canadian electoral districts
- Historical federal electoral districts of Canada
- Calgary North East provincial electoral district
