= Calgary East =

Federal electoral district in Alberta, Canada

Coordinates: 51.03°N 113.95°W

Alberta electoral district
- Interactive map of riding boundaries from the 2025 federal election

Federal electoral district
- Legislature: House of Commons
MP
Jasraj Hallan
Conservative
- District created: 1914
- First contested: 1917
- Last contested: 2025
- District webpage: profile, map

Demographics
- Population (2021): 119,550
- Census division: Division No. 6
- Census subdivision: Calgary (part)

Calgary East (French: Calgary-Est) is a federal electoral district in Alberta, Canada, that was represented in the House of Commons of Canada from 1917 to 1953, 1979 to 1988, 1997 to 2015, and since 2025. It has always been a lower-income urban riding in Calgary, with a sizable visible minority population.

Following the 2022 Canadian federal electoral redistribution, this riding was restored upon the call of the 2025 Canadian federal election. It was created out of Calgary Forest Lawn south of 16 Ave NE plus part of Vista Heights, and part of Calgary Shepard north of a line following 130 Ave SE to 52 St SE to Glenmore Trail.

== Demographics ==
According to the 2021 Canadian census

Languages: 70.3% English, 5.3% Tagalog, 4.1% Vietnamese, 2.7% Arabic, 2.0% Spanish, 1.8% French, 1.4% Cantonese, 1.2% Tigrigna

Religions: 48.2% Christian (23.2% Catholic, 2.9% United Church, 2.3% Christian Orthodox, 1.8% Anglican, 1.2% Pentecostal, 1.1% Lutheran, 1.0% Baptist, 14.7% Other), 37.1% No religion, 8.5% Muslim, 3.6% Buddhist

Median income: $38,400 (2020)

Average income: $46,880 (2020)

Panethnic groups in Calgary East (2021)
Panethnic group	2021	
Panethnic group	Pop.	%
European (Note: Statistic includes all persons that did not make up part of a visible minority or an indigenous identity.)	62,630	52.64%
Southeast Asian (Note: Statistic includes total responses of "Filipino" and "Southeast Asian" under visible minority section on census.)	19,945	16.76%
African	10,605	8.91%
Indigenous	6,660	5.6%
Middle Eastern (Note: Statistic includes total responses of "West Asian" and "Arab" under visible minority section on census.)	5,855	4.92%
South Asian	4,240	3.56%
East Asian (Note: Statistic includes total responses of "Chinese", "Korean", and "Japanese" under visible minority section on census.)	3,505	2.95%
Latin American	2,665	2.24%
Other/multiracial (Note: Statistic includes total responses of "Visible minority, n.i.e." and "Multiple visible minorities" under visible minority section on census.)	2,875	2.42%
Total responses	118,980	99.52%
Total population	119,555	100%
Notes: Totals greater than 100% due to multiple origin responses. Demographics based on 2022 Canadian federal electoral redistribution riding boundaries.

== History ==
This riding was originally created in 1914 as East Calgary from the electoral districts of Calgary and Macleod. The riding's name was changed in 1924 to Calgary East. It was abolished in 1952 when its territory was redistributed between Calgary North, Calgary South, and Macleod, with a small section going to Bow River. It was re-created in 1976 from parts of Calgary North, Calgary South, and Palliser ridings.

It was again abolished in 1987 when its territory was redistributed between Calgary Centre, Calgary Northeast, Calgary Southeast, Calgary Southwest, and Crowfoot ridings.

This electoral district was again created in 1996 from the ridings of Calgary Centre, Calgary Northeast, Calgary Southeast, and Wild Rose.

In 2013, Calgary East was abolished a third time. Most of the riding became part of Calgary Forest Lawn, with smaller portions transferred to Calgary Shepard and Calgary Centre.

This electoral district was created for a fourth time in 2023 from the ridings of Calgary Forest Lawn, and Calgary Shepard.

=== Members of Parliament ===
This riding has elected the following members of Parliament:

Parliament	Years	Member	Party
Riding created from Calgary and Macleod
East Calgary
13th	1917–1921	Daniel Lee Redman	Conservative
14th	1921–1925	William Irvine	Labour
Calgary East
15th	1925–1926	Fred Davis	Conservative
16th	1926–1930	Herbert Bealey Adshead	Labour
17th	1930–1935	George Douglas Stanley	Conservative
18th	1935–1940	John Landeryou	Social Credit
19th	1940–1945	George Henry Ross	Liberal
20th	1945–1949	Douglas Harkness	Progressive Conservative
21st	1949–1953	Douglas Harkness	Progressive Conservative
Riding dissolved into Bow River, Calgary North, Calgary South and Macleod
Riding re-created from Calgary North, Calgary South and Palliser
31st	1979–1980	John Kushner	Progressive Conservative
32nd	1980–1984	John Kushner	Progressive Conservative
33rd	1984–1988	Alex Kindy	Progressive Conservative
Riding dissolved into Calgary Centre, Calgary Southwest, Calgary Northeast and Calgary Southeast
Riding re-created from Calgary Northeast and Calgary Southeast
36th	1997–2000	Deepak Obhrai	Reform
36th	2000–2000	Deepak Obhrai	Alliance
37th	2000–2003	Deepak Obhrai	Alliance
37th	2003–2004	Deepak Obhrai	Conservative
38th	2004–2006	Deepak Obhrai	Conservative
39th	2006–2008	Deepak Obhrai	Conservative
40th	2008–2011	Deepak Obhrai	Conservative
41st	2011–2015	Deepak Obhrai	Conservative
Riding dissolved into Calgary Shepard, Calgary Forest Lawn, Calgary Centre and Calgary Midnapore
Riding re-created from Calgary Shepard and Calgary Forest Lawn
45th	2025–present	Jasraj Hallan	Conservative

== Election results ==
=== Calgary East, since 2025 ===
2025 Canadian federal election
Party	Candidate	Votes	%	±%	Expenditures
Conservative	Jasraj Singh Hallan	32,490	60.53	+7.67	$96,499.50
Liberal	Priti Obhrai-Martin	17,062	31.79	+13.25	$33,455.72
New Democratic	Jennifer Geha	2,092	3.90	–14.18	none listed
People's	Harry Dhillon	908	1.69	–5.48	none listed
Green	Carey Rutherford	664	1.24	–0.88	none listed
Christian Heritage	Garry Dirk	321	0.60	–	$425.00
Communist	Jonathan Trautman	137	0.26	–0.01	none listed
Total valid votes/expense limit		53,674	99.13	–	$135,227.44
Total rejected ballots		469	0.87	+0.33	
Turnout		54,143	60.16	+14.22	
Eligible voters		90,001			
Conservative hold		Swing		+10.46	
Source: Elections Canada

2021 federal election redistributed results
Party	Vote	%
Conservative	24,157	52.86
Liberal	8,474	18.54
New Democratic	8,264	18.08
People's	3,275	7.17
Green	967	2.12
Others	566	1.24

=== Calgary East, 1997–2015 ===
2011 Canadian federal election
Party	Candidate	Votes	%	±%	Expenditures
Conservative	Deepak Obhrai	23,372	67.43	+0.96	$79,466.97
New Democratic	Al Brown	4,894	14.12	+2.37	none listed
Liberal	Josipa Petrunic	4,102	11.83	+1.68	$37,155.33
Green	Scott W. Milton	2,047	5.91	–4.70	$3,160.59
Communist	Jason Devine	246	0.71	–0.30	$502.42
Total valid votes/expense limit		34,661	99.47	–	$85,741.55
Total rejected ballots		186	0.53	+0.06	
Turnout		34,847	45.94	+4.15	
Eligible voters		75,850			
Conservative hold		Swing		+1.67	
Source: Elections Canada

2008 Canadian federal election
Party	Candidate	Votes	%	±%	Expenditures
Conservative	Deepak Obhrai	21,311	66.47	–0.63	$77,527.91
New Democratic	Ian Vaughan	3,768	11.75	+0.88	$831.25
Green	Nathan David Coates	3,403	10.61	+3.20	$2,713.17
Liberal	Bernie Kennedy	3,255	10.15	–3.41	$6,923.42
Communist	Jason Devine	323	1.01	+0.41	$417.13
Total valid votes/expense limit		32,060	99.52	–	$83,826.32
Total rejected ballots		154	0.48	+0.03	
Turnout		32,214	41.79	–8.65	
Eligible voters		77,083			
Conservative hold		Swing		–0.75	
Source: Elections Canada

2006 Canadian federal election
Party	Candidate	Votes	%	±%	Expenditures
Conservative	Deepak Obhrai	26,766	67.10	+5.98	$78,232.62
Liberal	Dobie Yiu-Chung To	5,410	13.56	–7.71	$12,149.82
New Democratic	Patrick Arnell	4,338	10.87	+1.00	$2,642.75
Green	John Mark Taylor	2,954	7.41	+0.35	$1,910.10
Communist	Jason Devine	239	0.60	–0.08	$279.95
Canadian Action	Ghazanfar Khan	183	0.46	–	$99.00
Total valid votes/expense limit		39,890	99.55	–	$80,770.23
Total rejected ballots		181	0.45	–0.12	
Turnout		40,071	50.45	+2.66	
Eligible voters		79,435			
Conservative hold		Swing		+6.85	
Source: Elections Canada

2004 Canadian federal election
Party	Candidate	Votes	%	±%	Expenditures
Conservative	Deepak Obhrai	21,897	61.12	–9.62	$55,404.14
Liberal	James Maxim	7,621	21.27	+0.80	$50,725.48
New Democratic	Elizabeth Thomas	3,535	9.87	–	$4,491.19
Green	Dean Kenneth Christie	2,529	7.06	–	$1,526.26
Communist	Jason Devine	245	0.68	+0.23	$750.22
Total valid votes/expense limit		35,827	99.43	–	$76,374.37
Total rejected ballots		207	0.57	+0.22	
Turnout		36,034	47.79	–0.41	
Eligible voters		75,407			
Conservative gain from Alliance		Swing		–5.21	
Source: Elections Canada

2000 Canadian federal election
Party	Candidate	Votes	%	±%	Expenditures
Alliance	Deepak Obhrai	18,141	54.26	+9.28	$50,082
Liberal	Doug Perras	6,843	20.47	–2.33	$13,817
Progressive Conservative	Roger Richard	5,510	16.48	–8.14	$26,576
New Democratic	Kaie Jones	1,444	4.32	–2.17	$4,528
Marijuana	Grant Adam Krieger	1,222	3.65	–	$1,331
Communist	Jason Devine	152	0.45	–	$415
Natural Law	Neeraj Varma	124	0.37	–0.74	none listed
Total valid votes		33,436	99.65		
Total rejected ballots		118	0.35	–0.23	
Turnout		33,554	48.19	+0.31	
Eligible voters		69,624			
Alliance gain from Reform		Swing		+28.30	
Source: Elections Canada

1997 Canadian federal election
Party	Candidate	Votes	%	±%	Expenditures
Reform	Deepak Obhrai	13,348	44.98	–	$47,624
Progressive Conservative	Roger Richard	7,306	24.62	–	$40,312
Liberal	Nagah Hage	6,766	22.80	–	$20,633
New Democratic	Kaie Jones	1,926	6.49	–	$6,993
Natural Law	Santo Esposito	329	1.11	–	none listed
Total valid votes		29,675	99.41		
Total rejected ballots		175	0.59	+0.13	
Turnout		29,850	47.88	–17.74	
Eligible voters		62,338			
Reform gain from Progressive Conservative		Swing		+34.80	
Source: Elections Canada

=== Calgary East, 1979–1988 ===
1984 Canadian federal election
Party	Candidate	Votes	%	±%
Progressive Conservative	Alex Kindy	36,825	58.85	+6.01
Liberal	Rod Sykes	14,749	23.57	–3.14
New Democratic	Barry Pashak	8,558	13.68	+3.40
Independent	Dave G. Wereschuk	993	1.59	–
Confederation of Regions	Nora Galenzoski	658	1.05	–
Social Credit	Jim Othen	343	0.55	–0.42
Libertarian	Wayne Kollinger	324	0.52	–
Communist	Bruce Potter	122	0.19	+0.06
Total valid votes		62,572	99.54	
Total rejected ballots		289	0.46	+0.19
Turnout		62,861	65.63	+10.30
Eligible voters		95,783		
Progressive Conservative hold		Swing		+4.58
Source: Elections Canada

1980 Canadian federal election
Party	Candidate	Votes	%	±%
Progressive Conservative	John Kushner	23,073	52.84	–8.04
Liberal	Albert Ludwig	11,662	26.71	+3.02
New Democratic	Barry Pashak	4,490	10.28	–0.84
Independent	Jim C. Young	3,271	7.49	–
Rhinoceros	Philip J. Pazdor	638	1.46	–
Social Credit	Jim Othen	422	0.97	–0.76
Communist	Bruce Potter	58	0.13	–0.01
Marxist–Leninist	Margaret Peggy Askin	55	0.13	+0.01
Total valid votes		43,669	99.73	
Total rejected ballots		117	0.27	–0.06
Turnout		43,786	55.33	–8.57
Eligible voters		79,132		
Progressive Conservative hold		Swing		–5.53
Source: Elections Canada

1979 Canadian federal election
Party	Candidate	Votes	%	±%
Progressive Conservative	John Kushner	28,320	60.88	–
Liberal	Albert Ludwig	11,019	23.69	–
New Democratic	Barry Pashak	5,172	11.12	–
Independent	George Barber	1,080	2.32	–
Social Credit	Ted Hammond	805	1.73	–
Communist	Bruce Potter	65	0.14	–
Marxist–Leninist	Margaret Peggy Askin	54	0.12	–
Total valid votes		46,515	99.67	
Total rejected ballots		154	0.33	–
Turnout		46,669	63.90	–
Eligible voters		73,036		
Progressive Conservative hold		Swing		N/A
Source: Elections Canada

=== Calgary East, 1925 - 1952 ===
1949 Canadian federal election
Party	Candidate	Votes	%	±%
Progressive Conservative	Douglas Harkness	9,641	35.87	+4.35
Liberal	Donald Hugh Mackay	8,555	31.83	+12.55
Social Credit	Clifford Norman Clarke	5,597	20.83	–2.83
Co-operative Commonwealth	Warwick Freeman Kelloway	3,083	11.47	–11.35
Total valid votes		26,876	99.05	
Total rejected ballots		257	0.95	–1.41
Turnout		27,133	69.05	–4.31
Eligible voters		39,296		
Progressive Conservative hold		Swing		+8.45
Source: Library of Parliament

1945 Canadian federal election
Party	Candidate	Votes	%	±%
Progressive Conservative	Douglas Harkness	7,799	31.52	+7.91
Social Credit	Clifford Menzies Willmott	5,854	23.66	–1.58
Co-operative Commonwealth	Peter Newton Russell Morrison	5,646	22.82	–0.79
Liberal	George Henry Ross	4,771	19.28	–8.26
Labor–Progressive	Lionel Frank Edwards	672	2.72	–
Total valid votes		24,742	97.64	
Total rejected ballots		598	2.36	+0.64
Turnout		25,340	73.35	+2.63
Eligible voters		34,545		
Progressive Conservative gain from Liberal		Swing		+4.75
Source: Library of Parliament

1940 Canadian federal election
Party	Candidate	Votes	%	±%
Liberal	George Henry Ross	5,815	27.54	+13.21
Social Credit	John Landeryou	5,330	25.24	–21.34
National Government	Hugh Farthing	4,987	23.61	–9.81
Co-operative Commonwealth	Warwick Freeman Kelloway	4,986	23.61	+17.94
Total valid votes		21,118	98.28	
Total rejected ballots		369	1.72	+0.60
Turnout		21,487	70.73	–0.73
Eligible voters		30,381		
Liberal gain from Social Credit		Swing		+17.28
Source: Library of Parliament

1935 Canadian federal election
Party	Candidate	Votes	%	±%
Social Credit	John Landeryou	8,376	46.58	–
Conservative	George Douglas Stanley	6,009	33.42	–31.98
Liberal	Joseph Tweed Shaw	2,576	14.33	–
Co-operative Commonwealth	Edith Patterson	1,020	5.67	–
Total valid votes		17,981	98.88	
Total rejected ballots		203	1.12	+1.12
Turnout		18,184	71.45	+3.04
Eligible voters		25,449		
Social Credit gain from Conservative		Swing		+39.28
Source: Library of Parliament

1930 Canadian federal election
Party	Candidate	Votes	%	±%
Conservative	George Douglas Stanley	11,344	65.40	+22.64
Labour	Herbert Bealey Adshead	6,002	34.60	–21.28
Total valid votes		17,346	100.00	
Total rejected ballots		unknown		
Turnout		17,346	68.41	+8.55
Eligible voters		25,355		
Conservative gain from Labour		Swing		+21.96
Source: Library of Parliament

1926 Canadian federal election
Party	Candidate	Votes	%	±%
Labour	Herbert Bealey Adshead	6,707	55.88	+24.41
Conservative	Fred Davis	5,132	42.76	–4.40
Independent	William Edward Wood Guy	163	1.36	–
Total valid votes		12,002	100.00	
Total rejected ballots		unknown		
Turnout		12,002	59.86	+6.95
Eligible voters		20,050		
Labour gain from Conservative		Swing		+14.41
Source: Library of Parliament

1925 Canadian federal election
Party	Candidate	Votes	%	±%
Conservative	Fred Davis	5,560	47.16	–
Labour	William Irvine	3,710	31.47	–
Liberal	William McCartney Davidson	2,519	21.37	–
Total valid votes		11,789	100.00	
Total rejected ballots		unknown		
Turnout		11,789	52.91	–
Eligible voters		22,283		
Conservative hold		Swing		N/A
Source: Library of Parliament

=== East Calgary, 1917–1925 ===
1921 Canadian federal election: East Calgary
Party	Candidate	Votes	%	±%
Labour	William Irvine	6,135	43.65	+11.79
Conservative	Arthur LeRoy Smith	4,237	30.14	–
Liberal	Duncan Marshall	3,684	26.21	–
Total valid votes		14,056	100.00	
Total rejected ballots		unknown		
Turnout		14,056	62.22	–36.59
Eligible voters		22,591		
Labour gain from Government (Unionist)		Swing		N/A
Source: Library of Parliament

1917 Canadian federal election: East Calgary
Party	Candidate	Votes	%
Government (Unionist)	Daniel Lee Redman	8,363	68.14
Liberal–Labour	William Irvine	3,911	31.86
Total valid votes		12,274	100.00
Total rejected ballots		unknown	
Turnout		12,274	98.81
Eligible voters		12,422	
Note: In 1917 William Irvine ran as a joint candidate of the Non-Partisan League and the Calgary Labour League.
Source: Library of Parliament

== See also ==
- List of Canadian electoral districts
- Historical federal electoral districts of Canada
