= Devinder Shory =

Canadian politician (born 1958)

Member of Parliament for Calgary Northeast
- In office 19 October 2008 – 19 October 2015
- Preceded by: Art Hanger
- Succeeded by: Riding Abolished

Personal details
- Born: 3 August 1958 (age 68) Barnala, India
- Party: Conservative
- Spouse: Neetu Shory
- Profession: Lawyer

Devinder Shory (born 3 August 1958 in Barnala, Punjab, India) is a Canadian politician, who represented the electoral district of Calgary Northeast as a federal Member of Parliament from 2008 to 2015. Shory held a consultation in Calgary with industry and business leaders from across Manitoba to discuss a renewal of the government's global commerce strategy.

First elected in the 2008 Canadian federal election, he is a member of the Conservative Party. After redistricting, he sought reelection in the 2015 election in the riding of Calgary Skyview, a reconfigured version of Calgary Northeast. He was defeated by Liberal candidate Darshan Kang.

== Early life and career ==
Shory was born in Barnala, Punjab, India as the second-youngest of eight children. He earned a Bachelor of Arts degree and a Bachelor of Laws degree from Punjabi University, Patiala, Punjab, India. Before immigrating to Canada he practiced law in Punjab.

In 1997, Shory was given the chance to upgrade his foreign law credentials through the University of Alberta. In 1998, he was called to the Alberta Bar and subsequently set up his own law practice in Northeast Calgary.

Shory ran for MP in 2019, after losing in 2015. He dropped out of the Conservative nomination contest.

== Mortgage fraud accusation ==
In May 2010, he was named in a lawsuit launched by the Bank of Montreal for an alleged mortgage fraud scheme. Court documents obtained by the CBC allege Shory executed legal transactions misrepresenting the true owner of five separate properties in the Calgary area. The Bank alleges its losses from the scheme at $30 million.

Shory responded in a statement on his website "Through media stories, it has come to my attention that I have been named in a civil matter. I want to state that I have not yet been served with a statement of claim. When I am, I will defend myself vigorously against these accusations. I have done nothing wrong...I want to personally thank the many constituents who have already expressed their support for me and for my family."

When the Alberta Law Society settled the case with Bank of Montreal on behalf of the 17 lawyers named in the court documents, only four lawyers were sanctioned and Shory was not one of them. Shory is still a practicing lawyer.

== Electoral record ==
2015 Canadian federal election
Party	Candidate	Votes	%	±%	Expenditures
Liberal	Darshan Singh Kang	20,664	45.88	+17.24	$125,611.09
Conservative	Devinder Shory	17,885	39.75	-16.50	$155,284.22
New Democratic	Sahajvir Singh	3,605	8.01	-2.03	$91,462.67
Progressive Canadian	Najeeb Butt	957	2.13	–	$5,050.00
Green	Ed Reddy	846	1.88	-2.75	$682.50
Democratic Advancement	Stephen Garvey	786	1.75	–	$31,134.16
Independent	Joseph Young	182	0.40	–	$1,614.02
Marxist–Leninist	Daniel Blanchard	88	0.20	–0.24	–
Total valid votes/Expense limit		44,993	100.00		$206,487.35
Total rejected ballots		310	0.68	–	
Turnout		45,303	61.52	–	
Eligible voters		73,643			
Liberal gain from Conservative		Swing		+16.87	
Source: Elections Canada

2011 Canadian federal election
Party	Candidate	Votes	%	±%	Expenditures
Conservative	Devinder Shory	23,556	56.86%	+5.33%	
Liberal	Cam Stewart	11,466	27.68%	+7.43%	
New Democratic	Collette Singh	4,252	10.26%	+1.33%	
Green	Sheila Brown-Eckersley	1,949	4.70%	-0.84%	
Marxist–Leninist	Daniel Blanchard	204	0.49%	-0.08%	
Total valid votes/Expense limit		41,427	100.0%	–	

2008 Canadian federal election
Party	Candidate	Votes	%	±%	Expenditures
Conservative	Devinder Shory	18,917	51.53%	-13.33%	$74,207
Liberal	Sanam Kang	7,435	20.25%	-1.81%	$88,671
Independent	Roger Richard	4,837	13.17%	–	$65,270
New Democratic	Vinay Dey	3,279	8.93%	+1.09%	$10,829
Green	Abeed Monty Ahmad	2,035	5.54%	+1.16%	$25
Marxist–Leninist	Daniel Blanchard	211	0.57%	–	
Total valid votes/Expense limit		36,714	100%	$87,091	
Total rejected ballots		–			
Turnout		–	%		
