= Calgary Skyview =

Federal electoral district in Alberta, Canada

Alberta electoral district
- Interactive map of riding boundaries from the 2025 federal election

Federal electoral district
- Legislature: House of Commons
MP
Amanpreet Gill
Conservative
- District created: 2013
- First contested: 2015
- Last contested: 2025
- District webpage: profile, map

Demographics
- Population (2011): 110,189
- Electors (2019): 84,116
- Area (km²): 123
- Pop. density (per km²): 895.8
- Census division: Division No. 6
- Census subdivision: Calgary (part)

Calgary Skyview is a federal electoral district in Alberta, Canada, that has been represented in the House of Commons of Canada since 2015.

Calgary Skyview was created by the 2012 federal electoral boundaries redistribution and was legally defined in the 2013 representation order. It came into effect upon the call of the 42nd Canadian federal election, scheduled for October 2015. It was created out of the electoral district of Calgary Northeast.

In the 2022 Canadian federal electoral redistribution, southern parts of the riding will break off into the new Calgary McKnight district.

== Geography ==
The district consists of the Northeasternmost corner of the city of Calgary. It includes the communities surrounding the Calgary International Airport, although the airport itself has been redistributed into the district of Calgary McKnight.

== Demographics ==
According to the 2011 Canadian census

Languages: 50.0% English, 16.7% Punjabi, 6.5% Urdu, 4.4% Tagalog, 3.7% Chinese, 2.7% Spanish, 1.7% Arabic, 1.5% Vietnamese, 1.4% Hindi, 1.2% Persian, 1.2% French, 1.0% Bengali, 8.0% Other
Religions: 42.4% Christian, 16.3% Sikh, 14.3% Muslim, 4.5% Hindu, 2.2% Buddhist, 0.5% Other, 19.8% None
Median income: $30,961 (2010)
Average income: $37,064 (2010)

Panethnic groups in Calgary Skyview (2011−2021)
Panethnic group	2021		2016		2011	
Panethnic group	Pop.	%	Pop.	%	Pop.	%
South Asian	65,630	41.38%	50,290	37.22%	34,385	31.38%
European (Note: Statistic includes all persons that did not make up part of a visible minority or an indigenous identity.)	33,480	21.11%	37,870	28.03%	41,315	37.7%
Southeast Asian (Note: Statistic includes total responses of "Filipino" and "Southeast Asian" under visible minority section on census.)	21,395	13.49%	16,055	11.88%	11,605	10.59%
African	13,075	8.24%	9,705	7.18%	5,655	5.16%
Middle Eastern (Note: Statistic includes total responses of "West Asian" and "Arab" under visible minority section on census.)	7,620	4.8%	6,315	4.67%	4,335	3.96%
East Asian (Note: Statistic includes total responses of "Chinese", "Korean", and "Japanese" under visible minority section on census.)	6,085	3.84%	5,665	4.19%	5,020	4.58%
Latin American	3,945	2.49%	3,365	2.49%	2,770	2.53%
Indigenous	3,695	2.33%	3,330	2.46%	2,940	2.68%
Other/Multiracial (Note: Statistic includes total responses of "Visible minority, n.i.e." and "Multiple visible minorities" under visible minority section on census.)	3,685	2.32%	2,515	1.86%	1,545	1.41%
Total responses	158,605	99.35%	135,110	99.54%	109,575	99.44%
Total population	159,642	100%	135,730	100%	110,189	100%
Notes: Totals greater than 100% due to multiple origin responses. Demographics based on 2012 Canadian federal electoral redistribution riding boundaries.

== Members of Parliament ==
This riding has elected the following members of the House of Commons of Canada:

Parliament	Years	Member	Party
Calgary Skyview; Riding created from Calgary Northeast
42nd	2015–2017	Darshan Kang	Liberal
42nd	2017–2019	Darshan Kang	Independent
43rd	2019–2021	Jag Sahota	Conservative
44th	2021–2025	George Chahal	Liberal
45th	2025–present	Amanpreet Gill	Conservative

== Election results ==
View source data.
Graph of election results in Calgary Skyview (minor parties that never got 2% of the vote or didn't run consistently are omitted)

=== 2023 representation order ===
2025 Canadian federal election
Party	Candidate	Votes	%	±%	Expenditures
Conservative	Amanpreet S. Gill	27,808	55.45	+10.49	$109,959.91
Liberal	Hafeez Malik	18,842	37.57	+4.45	$83,972.11
New Democratic	Rajesh Angral	1,351	2.69	–13.84	
Independent	Minesh Patel	1,002	2.00	–	none listed
Independent	Scott Calverley	620	1.24	–	none listed
Independent	Jag Anand	529	1.05	–	$16,171.04
Total valid votes/expense limit		50,152	99.28	–	$128,083.71
Total rejected ballots		362	0.72	–0.33	
Turnout		50,514	61.52	+7.02	
Eligible voters		82,111			
Conservative notional hold		Swing		+7.47	
Source: Elections Canada

2021 federal election redistributed results
Party	Vote	%
Conservative	16,151	44.96
Liberal	11,899	33.12
New Democratic	5,938	16.53
People's	1,344	3.74
Green	328	0.91
Others	262	0.73

=== 2013 representation order ===
2021 Canadian federal election
Party	Candidate	Votes	%	±%	Expenditures
Liberal	George Chahal	20,092	42.36	+14.02	$102,944.51
Conservative	Jag Sahota	17,111	36.07	–16.42	$82,418.22
New Democratic	Gurinder Singh Gill	7,690	16.21	+1.29	$15,396.31
People's	Harry Dhillon	1,720	3.63	+2.44	$3,904.85
Green	Janna So	432	0.91	–0.67	none listed
Independent	Lee Aquart	184	0.39	–	$4,123.83
Marxist–Leninist	Daniel Blanchard	111	0.23	–0.03	none listed
Centrist	Nadeem Rana	93	0.20	–	$674.40
Total valid votes/expense limit		47,433	98.95	–	$116,250.12
Total rejected ballots		502	1.05	+0.08	
Turnout		47,935	54.50	–5.62	
Eligible voters		87,956			
Liberal gain from Conservative		Swing		+15.22	
Source: Elections Canada

2019 Canadian federal election
Party	Candidate	Votes	%	±%	Expenditures
Conservative	Jag Sahota	26,533	52.49	+12.74	$102,742.88
Liberal	Nirmala Naidoo	14,327	28.34	–17.54	$53,661.28
New Democratic	Gurinder Singh Gill	7,540	14.92	+6.90	$59,503.13
Green	Signe Knutson	800	1.58	–0.30	none listed
People's	Harry Dhillon	603	1.19	–	$8,416.69
Christian Heritage	Joseph Alexander	483	0.96	–	$8,970.10
Canada's Fourth Front	Harpreet Singh Dawar	136	0.27	–	$7,170.00
Marxist–Leninist	Daniel Blanchard	130	0.26	+0.06	none listed
Total valid votes/expense limit		50,552	99.03	–	$110,470.52
Total rejected ballots		497	0.97	+0.29	
Turnout		51,049	60.12	–0.61	
Eligible voters		84,915			
Conservative gain from Liberal		Swing		+15.14	
Source: Elections Canada

2015 Canadian federal election
Party	Candidate	Votes	%	±%	Expenditures
Liberal	Darshan Kang	20,644	45.88	+17.24	$125,611.09
Conservative	Devinder Shory	17,885	39.75	–16.50	$155,284.22
New Democratic	Sahajvir Singh	3,605	8.01	–2.03	$91,462.67
Progressive Canadian	Najeeb Butt	957	2.13	–	$8,150.00
Green	Ed Reddy	846	1.88	–2.75	$682.50
Democratic Advancement	Stephen J. Garvey	786	1.75	–	$31,834.16
Independent	Joseph Young	182	0.40	–	$1,614.02
Marxist–Leninist	Daniel Blanchard	88	0.20	–0.24	none listed
Total valid votes/expense limit		44,993	99.32	–	$206,487.35
Total rejected ballots		310	0.68	–	
Turnout		45,303	60.72	–	
Eligible voters		74,604			
Liberal gain from Conservative		Swing		+16.87	
Source: Elections Canada

2011 federal election redistributed results
Party	Vote	%
Conservative	16,573	56.25
Liberal	8,438	28.64
New Democratic	2,959	10.04
Green	1,364	4.63
Marxist–Leninist	129	0.44

== See also ==
- List of Canadian electoral districts
- Historical federal electoral districts of Canada
