= Shiraz Shariff =

Canadian politician

MLA for Calgary McCall
- In office April 20, 1995 – March 3, 2008
- Preceded by: Harry Sohal
- Succeeded by: Darshan Kang

Personal details
- Born: March 1, 1954 (age 72) Moshi, Tanzania
- Party: Progressive Conservative Association of Alberta

Shiraz Shariff (born March 1, 1954) is a politician from Alberta, Canada. He is a former Member of the Legislative Assembly of Alberta, representing the riding of Calgary-McCall from 1995 to 2008 as a Progressive Conservative. He was born in Tanzania.

== Political career ==
Shariff was elected to his first term in the Legislative Assembly of Alberta in a closely contested by-election in Calgary-McCall on April 20, 1995, defeating Liberal Jeet Shergill and future New Democratic Party president Anne McGrath by just a few hundred votes.

He won his second term in office a couple years later in the 1997 Alberta general election. Shariff won a more comfortable plurality defeating two other candidates. He won his third term in office with a moderate increase in plurality during the 2001 Alberta general election. Shariff was nearly defeated in the 2004 Alberta general election by Liberal Darshan Kang, the election was one of the closest in the Calgary region.

In his final bid for the Calgary-McCall seat, Shariff was defeated in the 2008 Alberta general election. The election was a virtual rematch of 2004 with almost all candidates being the same. Kang defeated Shariff by 98 votes after returns in the advanced polls showed he had won overwhelming victories. Kang's numbers increased upon the official recount to 118 votes. Shariff and the Progressive Conservatives have challenged the vote in court claiming that the results of the advanced polling and special ballots was tainted.

On January 21, 2012, Shariff secured the Progressive Conservative Party nomination for MLA in the riding Calgary-West, in what some observers described as a "shocking" victory over his leading rival candidate, Ken Hughes, the former Alberta Health Services Chairman who had resigned from his position to seek the nomination. Controversy would ensue as the nomination results were overturned by the party due to complaints and uncited irregularities. A second nomination meeting was held, and Hughes emerged victorious. Following this nomination, Hughes won the Calgary-West seat during the April 23, 2012 election.
