= Calgary-Bhullar-McCall =

Provincial electoral district in Alberta, Canada

Coordinates: 51.13°N 113.96°W

Alberta electoral district
- Calgary-Bhullar-McCall within the City of Calgary, 2017 boundaries

Provincial electoral district
- Legislature: Legislative Assembly of Alberta
MLA
Irfan Sabir
New Democratic
- District created: 1971
- First contested: 1971
- Last contested: 2023

Calgary-Bhullar-McCall is a provincial electoral district for the Legislative Assembly of Alberta, Canada. It was created in 1971, and was named after Frederick McCall and the McCall Industrial Park. As of the 2010 redistricting, the industrial park is no longer in the boundaries. In December 2021, a bill was passed renaming the constituency to Calgary-Bhullar-McCall in remembrance of late MLA Manmeet Bhullar.

The district includes the neighbourhoods of Castleridge, Falconridge, Martindale, Saddleridge, and Skyview Ranch, and is noted for its high levels of ethnic diversity.

== History ==
The electoral district was created in the 1971 boundary redistribution and was formed out of the north half of Calgary East.

The 2010 boundary redistribution significantly changed the riding. All land west of 36 Street NE was moved out of the district. The Calgary International Airport was moved into Calgary-Mackay-Nose Hill while the McCall Industrial Park was moved into Calgary-Cross. A large chunk of land south of 80 Street NE and east of Falconridge Blvd NE was moved into the new Calgary-Greenway constituency.

=== Boundary history ===
16 Calgary-McCall 2003 boundaries
Bordering districts
North	East	West	South
Airdrie-Chestermere and Foothills-Rocky View	Airdrie-Chestermere	Calgary-Mackay, Calgary-North Hill and Calgary-Nose Hill	Calgary-Cross, Calgary-East and Calgary-North Hill
riding map goes here			
Legal description from the Statutes of Alberta 2003, Electoral Divisions Act.
Starting at the intersection of the north Calgary city boundary with Deerfoot Trail NE; then 1. east and south along the city boundary to McKnight Boulevard NE; 2. west along McKnight Boulevard NE to 36 Street NE; 3. south along 36 Street NE to 32 Avenue NE; 4. west along 32 Avenue NE to Deerfoot Trail NE; 5. generally north and northeast along Deerfoot Trail NE to the starting point.
Note:

20 Calgary-McCall 2010 boundaries
Bordering districts
North	East	West	South
Chestermere-Rocky View	Chestermere-Rocky View	Calgary-Mackay-Nose Hill	Calgary-Cross and Calgary-Greenway
Legal description from the Statutes of Alberta 2010, Electoral Divisions Act.

=== Representation history ===
Assembly	Years	Member	Party
Calgary-McCall; Riding created from Calgary East
17th	1971–1975	George Ho Lem	Social Credit
18th	1975–1979	Andrew Little	Progressive Conservative
19th	1979–1982	Andrew Little	Progressive Conservative
20th	1982–1986	Stan Nelson	Progressive Conservative
21st	1986–1989	Stan Nelson	Progressive Conservative
22nd	1989–1993	Stan Nelson	Progressive Conservative
23rd	1993–1994	Harry Sohal	Progressive Conservative
23rd	1995–1997	Shiraz Shariff	Progressive Conservative
24th	1997–2001	Shiraz Shariff	Progressive Conservative
25th	2001–2004	Shiraz Shariff	Progressive Conservative
26th	2004–2008	Shiraz Shariff	Progressive Conservative
27th	2008–2012	Darshan Kang	Liberal
28th	2012–2015	Darshan Kang	Liberal
29th	2015–2019	Irfan Sabir	New Democratic
30th	2019–2023	Irfan Sabir	New Democratic
Calgary-Bhullar-McCall
31st	2023–Present	Irfan Sabir	New Democratic

The electoral district was created in the 1971 boundary redistribution. The first election held in the district that year returned former Calgary Alderman George Ho Lem who ran as a Social Credit candidate. He won a tight race over future MLA and Member of Parliament John Kushner.

The 1975 election would see the riding change hands as Ho Lem would be defeated by Progressive Conservative candidate Andrew Little in a landslide. Little ran for re-election in the 1979 general election and won easily taking over 70% of the popular vote. He retired at dissolution of the assembly in 1982.

The third representative of the riding was returned in the 1982 election. The race that year saw Progressive Conservative candidate Stan Nelson returned with a landslide majority of over 75% of the popular vote and over 17,000 votes. He was re-elected to his second term in 1986 with a substantially reduced number of votes but still with a landslide majority of around 63%. Nelson would win his third term in office in 1989 with just over half the popular vote. He would retire from the Assembly at dissolution in 1993.

McCall would elect Progressive Conservative candidate Harry Sohal in the 1993 election. The race was the first closely contested since 1971. Sohal held the seat with just under 45% of the popular vote. On November 15, 1994, while out jogging, Sohal had a heart attack. He did not survive, and the seat became vacant.

On April 20, 1995, a by-election was held to replace Sohal. The election was another closely contested race with voters returning Progressive Conservative candidate Shiraz Shariff with a plurality of just over 43% of the vote. Shariff won his second term with a large majority in 1997 and was returned to his third term with a majority in 2001.

Shariff's popularity started to slide after 2001. He was nearly defeated by Liberal candidate Darshan Kang in the 2004 election when he lost nearly half of his popular vote from 2001. He won fewer votes with a lower percentage than when he was first elected in the 1995 by-election. The two faced each other in the 2008 election with the reverse result. Shariff was defeated while Kang won his first term in office.

In 2015 New Democratic Party candidate Irfan Sabir was elected, beating the Wildrose Party challenger by fewer than 500 votes. He was re-elected in 2019 with 51.7% of the popular vote.

== Legislative election results ==
=== 2023 ===
2023 Alberta general election
Party	Candidate	Votes	%	±%
New Democratic	Irfan Sabir	7,265	58.00	+6.28
United Conservative	Amanpreet Singh Gill	5,261	42.00	+3.79
Total		12,526	99.19	–
Rejected and declined		102	0.81	
Turnout		12,628	52.91	
Eligible electors		23,867		
New Democratic hold		Swing		+1.24
Source(s) Source: Elections Alberta

=== 2019 ===
2019 Alberta general election: Calgary-McCall
Party	Candidate	Votes	%	±%
New Democratic	Irfan Sabir	6,567	51.72	+21.90
United Conservative	Jasraj Hallan	4,851	38.21	-11.90
Alberta Party	Avinash Khangura	636	5.01	
Liberal	Faiza Ali Abdi	281	2.21	-11.71
Green	Janice Fraser	218	1.72	
Independence	Don Edmonstone	84	0.66	--
Alberta Advantage	Larry Smith	60	0.47	--
Total valid votes		12,697	98.86	
Rejected, spoiled and declined		147	1.14	
Turnout		12,844	56.08	
Eligible voters		22,903		
New Democratic notional gain from United Conservative		Swing		+16.90
Source(s) "2019 Provincial General Election Results". Elections Alberta. Archived from the original on April 11, 2021.

=== 2015 ===
2015 Alberta general election: Calgary-McCall
Party	Candidate	Votes	%	±%
New Democratic	Irfan Sabir	3,812	29.95	+27.80
Wildrose	Happy Mann	3,367	26.45	-3.79
Progressive Conservative	Jagdeep Sahota	2,317	18.20	-11.09
Liberal	Avinash Khangura	2,224	17.47	-19.22
Independent	Burhan Khan	1,010	7.81	
Total valid votes		12,730	98.50	
Rejected, spoiled and declined		194	1.50	
Turnout		12,924	42.90	-1.91
Eligible voters		30,125		
New Democratic gain from Liberal		Swing		+23.51
Source(s) "2015 Provincial General Election Results". Elections Alberta. Archived from the original on April 11, 2021.

2015 Alberta general election redistributed results
Party	Votes	%
New Democratic	2,865	29.82
Progressive Conservative	2,447	25.47
Wildrose	2,367	24.64
Liberal	1,338	13.93
Independent	591	6.15
Source(s) Source: Ridingbuilder

=== 2012 ===
2012 Alberta general election: Calgary-McCall
Party	Candidate	Votes	%	±%
Liberal	Darshan Kang	3,865	36.69	-7.69
Wildrose	Grant Galpin	3,185	30.24	+24.62
Progressive Conservative	Muhammad Rasheed	3,085	29.29	-13.87
New Democratic	Collette Singh	227	2.15	-0.70
Evergreen	Heather Brocklesby	137	1.30	-2.69
Independent	Tanveer Taj	35	0.33	
Total valid votes		10,534	98.68	
Rejected, spoiled, and declined		141	1.32	
Turnout		10,675	44.81	+13.12
Registered electors		23,824		
Liberal hold		Swing		-16.16
Source(s) "Provincial General Election of the Twenty-Eighth Legislative Assembly" (PDF). Elections Alberta.

=== 2008 ===
2008 Alberta general election: Calgary-McCall
Party	Candidate	Votes	%	±%
Liberal	Darshan Kang	4,279	44.38%	4.93%
Progressive Conservative	Shiraz Shariff	4,161	43.16%	-0.44%
Wildrose Alliance	Ina Given	542	5.62%	-2.24%
Green	Heather Brocklesby	385	3.99%	-0.62%
New Democratic	Preet Sihota	275	2.85%	-1.63%
9,642				
Rejected, spoiled and declined		68		
Eligible electors / turnout		32,531	31.69%	
Liberal gain from Progressive Conservative		Swing		2.69%
The Report on the March 3, 2008 Provincial General Election of the Twenty-seventh Legislative Assembly. Elections Alberta. July 28, 2008. pp. 230–233.

=== 2004 ===
2004 Alberta general election: Calgary-McCall
Party	Candidate	Votes	%	±%
Progressive Conservative	Shiraz Shariff	3,195	43.60%	-26.55%
Liberal	Darshan Kang	2,891	39.45%	17.18%
Alberta Alliance	Ina Given	576	7.86%	
Green	Sean Brocklesby	338	4.61%	
New Democratic	Preet Sihota	328	4.48%	-0.32%
Total		7,328		
Rejected, spoiled and declined		86		
Eligible electors / turnout		21,831	33.96%	
Progressive Conservative hold		Swing		-21.87%
"Calgary-McCall Statement of Official Results 2004 Alberta general election" (PDF). Elections Alberta.

=== 2001 ===
2001 Alberta general election results		Turnout 39.00%		Swing	
Affiliation	Candidate	Votes	%	Party	Personal
Progressive Conservative	Shiraz Shariff	6,558	70.15%	11.29%	
Liberal	John Phillips	2,082	22.27%	-8.79%	
New Democratic	Preet Sihota	449	4.80%		
Alberta First	Darryl Elvers	139	1.49%		
Social Credit	Rory Cory	121	1.29%	-8.79%	
Total		9,349			
Rejected, spoiled and declined		38			
Eligible electors / Turnout		24,070	%		
Progressive Conservative hold		Swing		10.04%	

=== 1997 ===
1997 Alberta general election results		Turnout 41.84%		Swing	
Affiliation	Candidate	Votes	%	Party	Personal
Progressive Conservative	Shiraz Shariff	5,118	58.86%	15.22%	
Liberal	Amar Singh	2,701	31.06%	-3.55%	
Social Credit	Rory Cory	876	10.08%	1.86%	
Total		8,695			
Rejected, spoiled and declined		28			
Eligible electors / Turnout		20,847	%		
Progressive Conservative hold		Swing		9.39%	

=== 1995 by-election ===
Alberta provincial by-election, April 20, 1995: Calgary-McCall
Party	Candidate	Votes	%	±%
Progressive Conservative	Shiraz Shariff	2,496	43.64	−1.44
Liberal	Jeet Shergill	1,980	34.61	2.63
New Democratic	Anne McGrath	713	12.46	2.61
Social Credit	Doug Cooper	470	8.22	
Confederation of Regions	Peter Hope	61	1.07	−0.34
Total		5,720		
Rejected, spoiled and declined		17		
Eligible electors / Turnout		20,514	27.97	
Progressive Conservative hold		Swing		−2.04
Source: "Calgary-McCall by-election official results". Elections Alberta. April 20, 1995.

=== 1993 ===
1993 Alberta general election results		Turnout 49.38%		Swing	
Affiliation	Candidate	Votes	%	Party	Personal
Progressive Conservative	Harry Sohal	4,118	45.08%	0.47%	
Liberal	Anil Giga	2,921	31.98%	5.50%	
Independent	Brian Newman	1,066	11.67%		
New Democratic	Sylvia Lille	900	9.85%	-19.06%	
Confederation of Regions	Allen Maclennan	129	1.41%		
Total		9,134			
Rejected, spoiled and declined		80			
Eligible electors / Turnout		18,658	%		
Progressive Conservative hold		Swing		2.99%	

=== 1989 ===
1989 Alberta general election results		Turnout 39.24%		Swing	
Affiliation	Candidate	Votes	%	Party	Personal
Progressive Conservative	Stan Nelson	5,109	44.61%	-18.51%	
New Democratic	Ken Richmond	3,311	28.91%	0.54%	
Liberal	Anil Giga	3,032	26.48%	17.97%	
Total		11,452			
Rejected, spoiled and declined		22			
Eligible electors / Turnout		29,242	%		
Progressive Conservative hold		Swing		-9.53%	

=== 1986 ===
1986 Alberta general election results		Turnout 32.87%		Swing	
Affiliation	Candidate	Votes	%	Party	Personal
Progressive Conservative	Stan Nelson	5,418	63.12%	-13.38%	
New Democratic	Ken Richmond	2,435	28.37%	16.68%	
Liberal	John Gleason	730	8.51%	*	
Total		8,583			
Rejected, spoiled and declined		18			
Eligible electors / Turnout		26,167	%		
Progressive Conservative hold		Swing		-15.03%	

=== 1982 ===
1982 Alberta general election results		Turnout 53.84%		Swing	
Affiliation	Candidate	Votes	%	Party	Personal
Progressive Conservative	Stan Nelson	17,493	76.50%	5.96%	
New Democratic	Dennis Bennett	2,673	11.69%	4.22%	
Western Canada Concept	Terry Wolsey	1,728	7.56%	*	
Independent	Don Bryant	852	3.73%	*	
Alberta Reform Movement	Grand Majanja	120	0.52%	*	
Total		22,866			
Rejected, spoiled and declined		31			
Eligible electors / Turnout		42,524	%		
Progressive Conservative hold		Swing		5.09%	

=== 1979 ===
1979 Alberta general election results		Turnout 51.93%		Swing	
Affiliation	Candidate	Votes	%	Party	Personal
Progressive Conservative	Andrew Little	7,918	70.54%	5.44%	
Social Credit	Jim Richards	1,757	15.65%	-8.65%	
New Democratic	Dave Hammond	838	7.47%	-0.34%	
Liberal	Ron Chahal	691	6.16%	3.02%	
Communist	Michael Parker	20	0.18%	0.15%	*
Total		11,224			
Rejected, spoiled and declined		25			
Eligible electors / Turnout		17,309	%		
Progressive Conservative hold		Swing		7.05%	

=== 1975 ===
1975 Alberta general election results		Turnout 50.68%		Swing	
Affiliation	Candidate	Votes	%	Party	Personal
Progressive Conservative	Andrew Little	9,102	65.10%	28.49%	
Social Credit	George Ho Lem	3,397	24.30%	-20.43%	
New Democratic	Doreen Heath	997	7.13%	-10.21%	
Liberal	Garry Willis	440	3.14%	1.83%	
Communist	Colin Constant	46	0.33%	*	
Total		13,982			
Rejected, spoiled and declined		41			
Eligible electors / Turnout		17,309	%		
Progressive Conservative gain from Social Credit		Swing		24.46%	

=== 1971 ===
1971 Alberta general election results		Turnout 67.64%		Swing	
Affiliation	Candidate	Votes	%	Party	Personal
Social Credit	George Ho Lem	5,116	44.73%		
Progressive Conservative	John Kushner	4,187	36.61%		
New Democratic	Ted Takacs	1,984	17.34%		
Liberal	Natalie Chapman	151	1.32%	*	
Total		11,438			
Rejected, spoiled and declined		270			
Eligible electors / Turnout		17,309	%		
Social Credit gain		Swing		N/A	

== Senate nominee election results ==
=== 2004 ===
2004 Senate nominee election results: Calgary-McCall				Turnout 33.85%	
Affiliation	Candidate	Votes	% votes	% ballots	Rank
Progressive Conservative	Bert Brown	3,007	14.53%	47.53%	1
Progressive Conservative	Betty Unger	2,488	12.02%	39.32%	2
Progressive Conservative	Jim Silye	2,476	11.97%	39.13%	5
Progressive Conservative	Cliff Breitkreuz	2,019	9.76%	31.91%	3
Progressive Conservative	David Usherwood	1,946	9.40%	30.76%	6
Independent	Link Byfield	1,938	9.37%	30.63%	4
Alberta Alliance	Gary Horan	1,803	8.71%	28.50%	10
Alberta Alliance	Michael Roth	1,726	8.34%	27.28%	7
Alberta Alliance	Vance Gough	1,721	8.32%	27.20%	8
Independent	Tom Sindlinger	1,569	7.58%	24.80%	9
Total votes		20,693	100%		
Total ballots		6,327	3.27 votes per ballot		
Rejected, spoiled and declined		1,062			
21,831 eligible electors

Voters had the option of selecting four candidates on the ballot

== Student vote results ==
=== 2004 ===
Participating schools
Bethel Christian Academy
Grant MacEwan Elementary School
James Fowler High School
Terry Fox Junior High School

On November 19, 2004, a student vote was conducted at participating Alberta schools to parallel the 2004 Alberta general election results. The vote was designed to educate students and simulate the electoral process for persons who have not yet reached the legal majority. The vote was conducted in 80 of the 83 provincial electoral districts with students voting for actual election candidates. Schools with a large student body that reside in another electoral district had the option to vote for candidates outside of the electoral district then where they were physically located.

2004 Alberta student vote results
Affiliation	Candidate	Votes	%
Progressive Conservative	Shiraz Shariff	290	38.26%
Liberal	Darshan Kang	272	35.88%
Green	Sean Brocklesby	94	12.40%
NDP	Preet Sihota	68	8.97%
Alberta Alliance	Ina Given	34	4.49%
Total		758	100%
Rejected, spoiled and declined		32	

== See also ==
- List of Alberta provincial electoral districts
- Canadian provincial electoral districts
