= Jag Sahota =

Canadian politician (born 1978)

Jagdeep Kaur Sahota
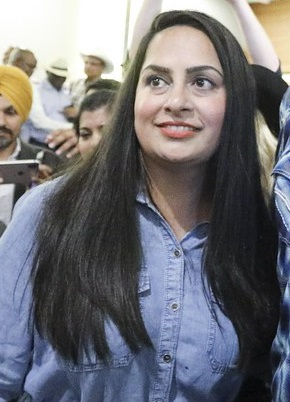

Shadow Minister for Women and Gender Equality

Member of Parliament for Calgary Skyview
- In office October 21, 2019 – September 20, 2021
- Preceded by: Darshan Kang
- Succeeded by: George Chahal

Personal details
- Born: 1978 (age 47–48) Calgary, Alberta, Canada
- Party: Conservative Party of Canada
- Profession: Lawyer

Jagdeep Kaur Sahota (born 1978) is a Canadian Punjabi politician who served as the Member of Parliament for the riding of Calgary Skyview from 2019 to 2021 as a member of the Conservative Party of Canada. She was elected to the House of Commons of Canada in the 2019 Canadian federal election. She was defeated in the 2021 federal election, losing to George Chahal of the Liberal Party. Sahota tried to regain her seat as the party nominee for 2025 federal election but the party appointed someone else.

She previously ran in the 2015 Alberta general election for Calgary-McCall, losing to Irfan Sabir.

== Electoral record ==
=== Federal ===
2021 Canadian federal election: Calgary Skyview
Party	Candidate	Votes	%	±%	Expenditures
Liberal	George Chahal	20,092	42.36	+14.02	$102,944.51
Conservative	Jag Sahota	17,111	36.07	–16.42	$82,418.22
New Democratic	Gurinder Singh Gill	7,690	16.21	+1.29	$15,396.31
People's	Harry Dhillon	1,720	3.63	+2.44	$3,904.85
Green	Janna So	432	0.91	–0.67	none listed
Independent	Lee Aquart	184	0.39	–	$4,123.83
Marxist–Leninist	Daniel Blanchard	111	0.23	–0.03	none listed
Centrist	Nadeem Rana	93	0.20	–	$674.40
Total valid votes/expense limit		47,433	98.95	–	$116,250.12
Total rejected ballots		502	1.05	+0.08	
Turnout		47,935	54.50	–5.62	
Eligible voters		87,956			
Liberal gain from Conservative		Swing		+15.22	
Source: Elections Canada

2019 Canadian federal election: Calgary Skyview
Party	Candidate	Votes	%	±%	Expenditures
Conservative	Jag Sahota	26,533	52.49	+12.74	$102,742.88
Liberal	Nirmala Naidoo	14,327	28.34	–17.54	$53,661.28
New Democratic	Gurinder Singh Gill	7,540	14.92	+6.90	$59,503.13
Green	Signe Knutson	800	1.58	–0.30	none listed
People's	Harry Dhillon	603	1.19	–	$8,416.69
Christian Heritage	Joseph Alexander	483	0.96	–	$8,970.10
Canada's Fourth Front	Harpreet Singh Dawar	136	0.27	–	$7,170.00
Marxist–Leninist	Daniel Blanchard	130	0.26	+0.06	none listed
Total valid votes/expense limit		50,552	99.03	–	$110,470.52
Total rejected ballots		497	0.97	+0.29	
Turnout		51,049	60.12	–0.61	
Eligible voters		84,915			
Conservative gain from Liberal		Swing		+15.14	
Source: Elections Canada

=== Provincial ===
2015 Alberta general election: Calgary-McCall
Party	Candidate	Votes	%	±%
New Democratic	Irfan Sabir	3,812	29.95	+27.80
Wildrose	Happy Mann	3,367	26.45	-3.79
Progressive Conservative	Jagdeep Sahota	2,317	18.20	-11.09
Liberal	Avinash Khangura	2,224	17.47	-19.22
Independent	Burhan Khan	1,010	7.81	
Total valid votes		12,730	98.50	
Rejected, spoiled and declined		194	1.50	
Turnout		12,924	42.90	-1.91
Eligible voters		30,125		
New Democratic gain from Liberal		Swing		+23.51
Source(s) "2015 Provincial General Election Results". Elections Alberta. Archived from the original on 2021-04-11.
