= Andrew Little (Canadian politician) =

Canadian politician (1919–1993)

Andrew "Andy" Little

MLA for Calgary McCall
- In office 1975–1982
- Preceded by: George Ho Lem
- Succeeded by: Stan Nelson

Personal details
- Born: March 6, 1919 Calgary, Alberta
- Died: February 2, 1993 (aged 73) Calgary, Alberta
- Party: Progressive Conservative Association of Alberta

Andrew Little (March 6, 1919 – February 2, 1993) was a politician from Alberta, Canada.

Little was first elected to the Legislative Assembly of Alberta in the 1975 Alberta general election defeating Social Credit incumbent George Ho Lem by almost 5705 votes. He represented the Progressive Conservatives for Calgary McCall, and served as a back bencher in the Progressive Conservative government.

In the 1979 Alberta general election, Little was easily re-elected to a second term in office. He served out his full term and retired in 1982.

While serving in the Alberta Legislative Assembly he was chairman of the Alberta Human Tissue Procurement Task Force and Alberta's Occupational Health and Safety Council.

Little died on February 2, 1993, of a heart attack. He also had Parkinson's disease.
