= Dalwinder Gill =

Canadian politician

Dalwinder Gill MP

Member of Parliament for Calgary McKnight
- Incumbent
- Assumed office April 28, 2025
- Preceded by: riding created

Personal details
- Party: Conservative

Dalwinder Gill MP is a Canadian politician from the Conservative Party of Canada. He was elected Member of Parliament for Calgary McKnight in the 2025 Canadian federal election. He defeated Liberal MP George Chahal who moved seats due to boundary changes. Prior to entering politics, Gill served as a realtor for 21 years. He is of Indian heritage.

At the time of the 2025 Canadian federal election, he lived in Chestermere, Alberta.

== Electoral record ==
2025 Canadian federal election: Calgary McKnight
** Preliminary results — Not yet official **
| Party | Candidate | Votes | % | ±% | Expenditures |
|---|---|---|---|---|---|
| Conservative | Dalwinder Gill | 20,850 | 49.13 | +14.91 | |
| Liberal | George Chahal | 19,516 | 45.99 | +2.23 | |
| New Democratic | Arlington Antonio Santiago | 1,204 | 2.84 | –13.34 | |
| People's | Najeeb Butt | 323 | 0.76 | –3.18 | |
| Green | Evelyn Tanaka | 273 | 0.64 | –0.49 | |
| Canadian Future | Benjamin Cridland | 162 | 0.38 | N/A | |
| Centrist | Syed Hasnain | 107 | 0.25 | N/A | |
| Total valid votes/expense limit | | | | | |
| Total rejected ballots | | | | | |
| Turnout | | 42,435 | 56.22 | | |
| Eligible voters | | 75,474 | | | |
| Conservative notional gain from Liberal | | Swing | | +6.34 | |
Source: Elections Canada
