= Irfan Sabir =

Canadian lawyer and politician (born 1977 in Rawalakot)

The Honourable Irfan Sabir ECA MLA
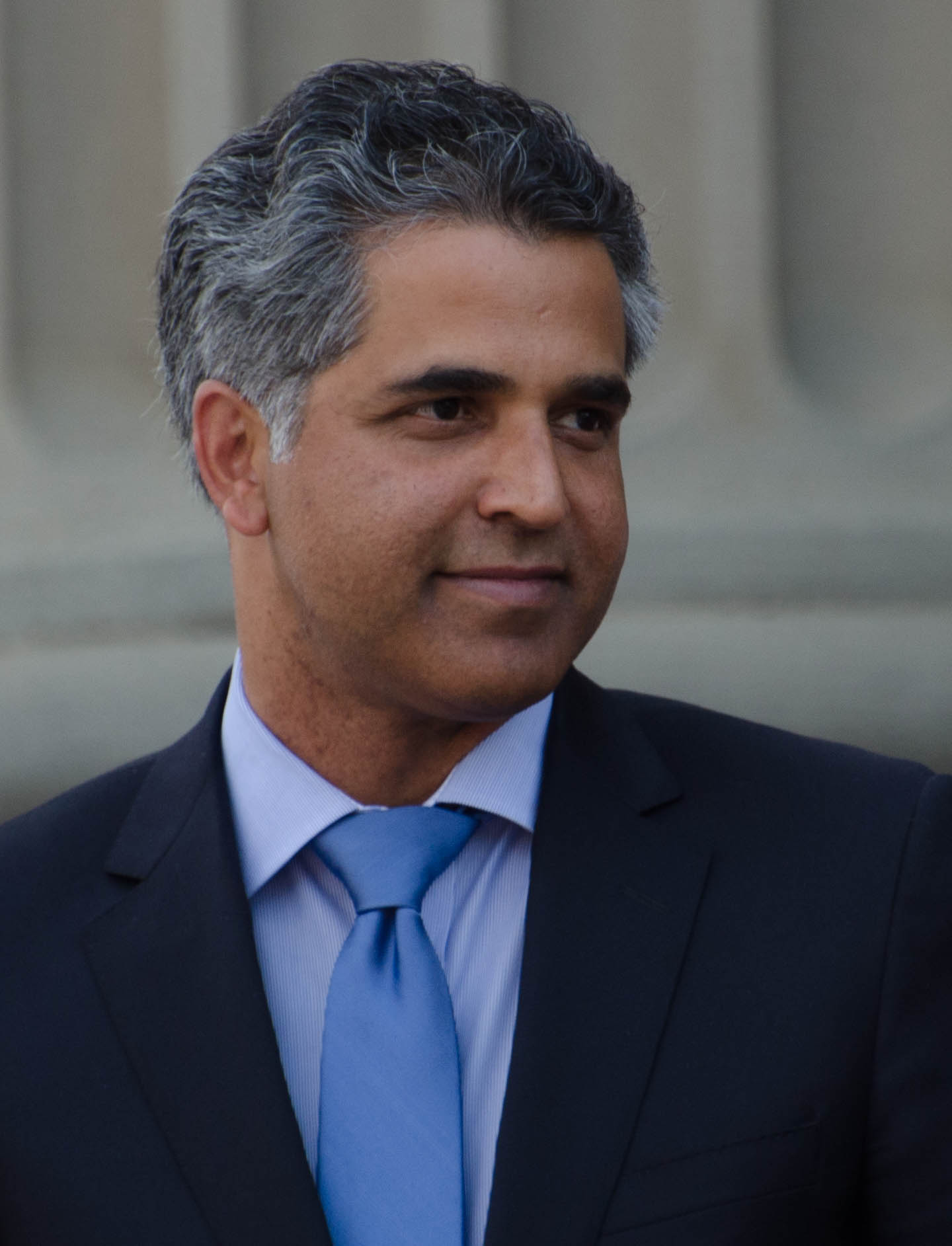
- Sabir in May 2015

Alberta Minister of Community and Social Services
- In office May 24, 2015 – April 30, 2019
- Preceded by: Heather Klimchuk
- Succeeded by: Rajan Sawhney

Member of the Legislative Assembly of Alberta for Calgary-Bhullar-McCall
- Incumbent
- Assumed office May 5, 2015
- Preceded by: Darshan Kang

Personal details
- Born: December 19, 1977 (age 48) Rawalakot, Azad Kashmir, Pakistan
- Party: Alberta New Democratic Party
- Education: University of Calgary
- Occupation: Lawyer
- Portfolio: Minister of Human Services

Irfan Sabir ECA MLA (born December 19, 1977) is a Canadian lawyer and politician who was elected to the Legislative Assembly of Alberta in the 2015 and 2019 Alberta general elections to represent the electoral district of Calgary-Bhullar-McCall. He is a member of the Alberta New Democratic Party. In the 29th Alberta Legislature his party formed a majority government and he was a member of the Executive Council of Alberta as the Minister of Community and Social Services between 2015 and 2019. In the 30th Alberta Legislature, beginning in 2019, his party formed the official opposition to a United Conservative Party majority government. As of June 21, 2024, he serves as the Official Opposition critic for Justice and Public Safety as well as the Deputy House Leader of the Official Opposition.

== Background ==
Sabir was raised in Rawalakot, Azad Kashmir, Pakistan, where he obtained an economics degree. He moved to Calgary in 2004, and obtained degrees in social work and law at the University of Calgary. In 2012, he began working at Maurice Law Barristers and Solicitors, where he specialized in Aboriginal law. In the past, he has also worked for a Calgary homeless shelter and volunteered for Calgary Legal Guidance and Red Cross Canada.

== Electoral history ==
=== 2015 general election ===
2015 Alberta general election: Calgary-McCall
Party	Candidate	Votes	%	±%
New Democratic	Irfan Sabir	3,812	29.95	+27.80
Wildrose	Happy Mann	3,367	26.45	-3.79
Progressive Conservative	Jagdeep Sahota	2,317	18.20	-11.09
Liberal	Avinash Khangura	2,224	17.47	-19.22
Independent	Burhan Khan	1,010	7.81	
Total valid votes		12,730	98.50	
Rejected, spoiled and declined		194	1.50	
Turnout		12,924	42.90	-1.91
Eligible voters		30,125		
New Democratic gain from Liberal		Swing		+23.51
Source(s) "2015 Provincial General Election Results". Elections Alberta. Archived from the original on 2021-04-11.

=== 2019 general election ===
2019 Alberta general election: Calgary-McCall
Party	Candidate	Votes	%	±%
New Democratic	Irfan Sabir	6,567	51.72	+21.90
United Conservative	Jasraj Hallan	4,851	38.21	-11.90
Alberta Party	Avinash Khangura	636	5.01	
Liberal	Faiza Ali Abdi	281	2.21	-11.71
Green	Janice Fraser	218	1.72	
Independence	Don Edmonstone	84	0.66	--
Alberta Advantage	Larry Smith	60	0.47	--
Total valid votes		12,697	98.86	
Rejected, spoiled and declined		147	1.14	
Turnout		12,844	56.08	
Eligible voters		22,903		
New Democratic notional gain from United Conservative		Swing		+16.90
Source(s) "2019 Provincial General Election Results". Elections Alberta. Archived from the original on 2021-04-11.

=== 2023 general election ===
2023 Alberta general election: Calgary-Bhullar-McCall
Party	Candidate	Votes	%	±%
New Democratic	Irfan Sabir	7,265	58.00	+6.28
United Conservative	Amanpreet Singh Gill	5,261	42.00	+3.79
Total		12,526	99.19	–
Rejected and declined		102	0.81	
Turnout		12,628	52.91	
Eligible electors		23,867		
New Democratic hold		Swing		+1.24
Source(s) Source: Elections Alberta
