= Amanpreet Gill =

Canadian politician

Amanpreet Gill MP

Member of Parliament for Calgary Skyview
- Incumbent
- Assumed office April 28, 2025
- Preceded by: George Chahal

Personal details
- Party: Conservative (federal)
- Other political affiliations: United Conservative (provincial)

Amanpreet Singh Gill MP is a Canadian politician from the Conservative Party of Canada. He was elected Member of Parliament for Calgary Skyview. He succeeded Liberal MP George Chahal. He was the United Conservative Party (UCP) candidate for Calgary-Bhullar-McCall at the 2023 Alberta general election. Prior to entering politics, Gill managed a local gurdwara. He is of Indian heritage.

At the time of the 2025 Canadian federal election, he lived in Rocky View County.

== Electoral record ==
2025 Canadian federal election: Calgary Skyview
Party	Candidate	Votes	%	±%	Expenditures
Conservative	Amanpreet S. Gill	27,808	55.45	+10.49	$109,959.91
Liberal	Hafeez Malik	18,842	37.57	+4.45	$83,972.11
New Democratic	Rajesh Angral	1,351	2.69	–13.84	
Independent	Minesh Patel	1,002	2.00	–	none listed
Independent	Scott Calverley	620	1.24	–	none listed
Independent	Jag Anand	529	1.05	–	$16,171.04
Total valid votes/expense limit		50,152	99.28	–	$128,083.71
Total rejected ballots		362	0.72	–0.33	
Turnout		50,514	61.52	+7.02	
Eligible voters		82,111			
Conservative notional hold		Swing		+7.47	
Source: Elections Canada

2023 Alberta general election: Calgary-Bhullar-McCall
Party	Candidate	Votes	%	±%
New Democratic	Irfan Sabir	7,265	58.00	+6.28
United Conservative	Amanpreet Singh Gill	5,261	42.00	+3.79
Total		12,526	99.19	–
Rejected and declined		102	0.81	
Turnout		12,628	52.91	
Eligible electors		23,867		
New Democratic hold		Swing		+1.24
Source(s) Source: Elections Alberta
