= George Ho Lem =

Canadian politician

MLA for Calgary McCall
- In office 1971–1975
- Preceded by: none
- Succeeded by: Andrew Little

Personal details
- Born: June 15, 1918 Calgary, Alberta, Canada
- Died: July 9, 2005 (aged 87) Calgary, Alberta, Canada
- Party: Alberta Social Credit Party

George Ho Lem Sr. (何榮禧) (June 15, 1918 – July 9, 2005) was a Canadian politician, businessman, and community leader from Alberta.

== Early life, business career and community service ==
George Ho Lem was born in Calgary, Alberta, in 1918. His mother Mary Ho Lem was the first recorded female Chinese resident of Calgary.

He started a successful dry cleaning business and was also a successful restaurateur. He was also a horse breeder who won two Alberta Derbies and was once declared thoroughbred breeder of the year.

He served as a director of Stampede Park for 18 years, and was granted a lifetime membership as an honorary director. He also served as a president of the Calgary Junior Chamber of Commerce, and as a chairman of the board of the Calgary Auxiliary Hospital for sixteen years. He was a founding director of the Metropolitan Calgary Foundation and a long-standing member of the Calgary Stampeders Football Booster Club. His interest in sports led him to Co-chair the 1978 Commonwealth Games held in Edmonton.

He was also very active in the Calgary Chinese community. Few of the organizations he was involved with were the Sien Lok Society, the Oi Kwan Society, the Calgary Chinatown Development Foundation and the Calgary Multicultural Society. He served as a founder, president or chairman of most of these groups.

== Politics ==
Ho Lem began his political career in 1959 as an alderman of the City of Calgary. He polled the most votes of the sixteen candidates in that year's election. He was the second person of Chinese descent to win a municipal election in Canada. He was re-elected in 1962, and served a total of six years on city council. In 1969, he was the manager of Rod Sykes's mayoral campaign.

Ho Lem was elected to the Legislative Assembly of Alberta in the 1971 general election in the electoral district of Calgary McCall under the banner of the Social Credit Party. He was the first person of Chinese descent elected to the Alberta Legislature. During his term in the Assembly, he served on the Law and Regulations, Privileges and Elections, Standing Orders and Printing, and Public Affairs committees. He also served on the Select Special Committee on Foreign Investment. He was defeated in the 1975 election by Progressive Conservative candidate Andrew Little.

He ran for Parliament in the 1980 Canadian Federal Election in Calgary Centre as a member of the Liberal Party. He was defeated by incumbent Harvie Andre of the Progressive Conservative Party.

The Legislative Assembly of Alberta paid special tribute to Ho Lem's accomplishments on November 20, 2001

Legislative Assembly of Alberta
| Preceded by New District | MLA Calgary McCall; 1971–1975 | Succeeded by Andrew Little |
