= Jasraj Singh Hallan =

Canadian politician (born 1984)

Jasraj Hallan MP
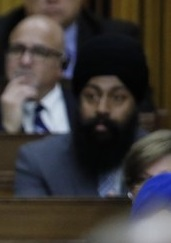

Member of Parliament for Calgary East Calgary Forest Lawn (2019–2025)
- Incumbent
- Assumed office October 21, 2019
- Preceded by: Deepak Obhrai
Shadow Minister
2026–present	National Revenue
2022–2026	Finance
2021–2022	Immigration

Personal details
- Born: Jasraj Singh Hallan; December 25, 1984 (age 41) Dubai, United Arab Emirates
- Party: Conservative
- Other political affiliations: United Conservative
- Education: Southern Alberta Institute of Technology
- Profession: Politician, Businessman

Jasraj Singh Hallan MP (born 1984) is a Canadian politician who was elected to represent the riding of Calgary East in the House of Commons of Canada in the 2019 Canadian federal election. Born in Dubai to Indian parents, he immigrated to Canada as a child and was raised in Calgary. Before entering politics, he was a businessman in Calgary, owning a home building business.

== Early life and career ==
Hallan came to Canada at five years old. He is the son of two economically disadvantaged parents from Dubai. Hallan described himself growing up as an "at-risk youth" involved in gangs in northeast Calgary. He graduated from Lester Pearson High School. He has completed an accounting diploma from the Southern Alberta Institute of Technology. He also has a certified Master Builder designation and ran a homebuilding business operating in Calgary.

== Politics ==
Hallan previously ran in the 2019 Alberta general election for the riding of Calgary-McCall for the United Conservative Party, losing to Irfan Sabir.

Following the death of then-Member of Parliament for Calgary Forest Lawn, Deepak Obhrai in 2019, the Conservative Party of Canada opened a nomination race for the Conservative Candidacy for Calgary Forest Lawn in the 2019 Canadian Federal Election. The nomination was contested by Obhrai's son, Aman Obhrai, Calgary City Councillor Andre Chabot and Amrit Rai Nannan and was won by Hallan.

Hallan won the riding of Calgary Forest Lawn in the 2019 Canadian Federal Election with almost 60% of the popular vote.

Hallan voted in support of Bill C-233 - an act to amend the Criminal Code (sex-selective abortion), which would make it an indictable or a summary offence for a medical practitioner to knowingly perform an abortion solely on the grounds of the child's genetic sex.

In 2022, Hallan became the Conservative's party finance critic. In addition, he is one of the Conservative MPs involved in the party effort to outreach to the immigrant and newcomer communities in Canada.

He was elected vice chair of the Canadian House of Commons Standing Committee on Finance in the 45th Canadian Parliament in 2025.

== Personal life ==
Hallan currently lives in North East Calgary. An immigrant from Dubai himself, he describes himself as dedicating his time to helping youth in his community and immigrants and refugees to Canada. Hallan sponsored a refugee family from Afghanistan in 2019.

== Electoral record ==
=== Federal ===
2025 Canadian federal election: Calgary East
Party	Candidate	Votes	%	±%	Expenditures
Conservative	Jasraj Singh Hallan	32,490	60.53	+7.67	$96,499.50
Liberal	Priti Obhrai-Martin	17,062	31.79	+13.25	$33,455.72
New Democratic	Jennifer Geha	2,092	3.90	–14.18	none listed
People's	Harry Dhillon	908	1.69	–5.48	none listed
Green	Carey Rutherford	664	1.24	–0.88	none listed
Christian Heritage	Garry Dirk	321	0.60	–	$425.00
Communist	Jonathan Trautman	137	0.26	–0.01	none listed
Total valid votes/expense limit		53,674	99.13	–	$135,227.44
Total rejected ballots		469	0.87	+0.33	
Turnout		54,143	60.16	+14.22	
Eligible voters		90,001			
Conservative hold		Swing		+10.46	
Source: Elections Canada

2021 Canadian federal election
Party	Candidate	Votes	%	±%
Conservative	Jasraj Hallan	15,434	44.5	-15.1
Liberal	Jordan Stein	9,608	27.7	+6.0
New Democratic	Keira Gunn	6,254	18.1	+7.5
People's	Dwayne Holub	2,468	7.1	+4.4
Green	Carey Rutherford	699	2.0	-1.3
Communist	Jonathan Trautman	185	0.5	+0.2
Total valid votes		34,648	100.0	
Total rejected ballots		442		
Turnout		35,090	48.16	
Eligible voters		72,858		
Conservative hold		Swing		-10.55
Source: Elections Canada

2019 Canadian federal election: Calgary Forest Lawn
Party	Candidate	Votes	%	±%	Expenditures
Conservative	Jasraj Singh Hallan	23,805	59.57	+11.59	$89,191.38
Liberal	Jag Anand	8,690	21.74	–14.22	$41,769.04
New Democratic	Joe Pimlott	4,227	10.58	+0.82	$956.74
Green	William Carnegie	1,318	3.30	+0.31	$2,962.82
People's	Dave Levesque	1,089	2.72	–	$6,037.90
Independent	Brent Nichols	388	0.97	–	none listed
Christian Heritage	Esther Sutherland	222	0.56	–	$1,021.00
Communist	Jonathan Trautman	134	0.34	–0.61	$476.56
Veterans Coalition	William James Ryder	91	0.23	–	none listed
Total valid votes/expense limit		39,964	99.02	–	$105,644.29
Total rejected ballots		395	0.98	+0.15	
Turnout		40,359	53.33	–1.62	
Eligible voters		75,683			
Conservative hold		Swing		+12.91	
Source: Elections Canada

=== Provincial ===
2019 Alberta general election: Calgary-McCall
Party	Candidate	Votes	%	±%
New Democratic	Irfan Sabir	6,567	51.72	+21.90
United Conservative	Jasraj Hallan	4,851	38.21	-11.90
Alberta Party	Avinash Khangura	636	5.01	
Liberal	Faiza Ali Abdi	281	2.21	-11.71
Green	Janice Fraser	218	1.72	
Independence	Don Edmonstone	84	0.66	--
Alberta Advantage	Larry Smith	60	0.47	--
Total valid votes		12,697	98.86	
Rejected, spoiled and declined		147	1.14	
Turnout		12,844	56.08	
Eligible voters		22,903		
New Democratic notional gain from United Conservative		Swing		+16.90
Source(s) "2019 Provincial General Election Results". Elections Alberta. Archived from the original on 2021-04-11.
