= Darshan Kang =

Canadian politician (born 1951)

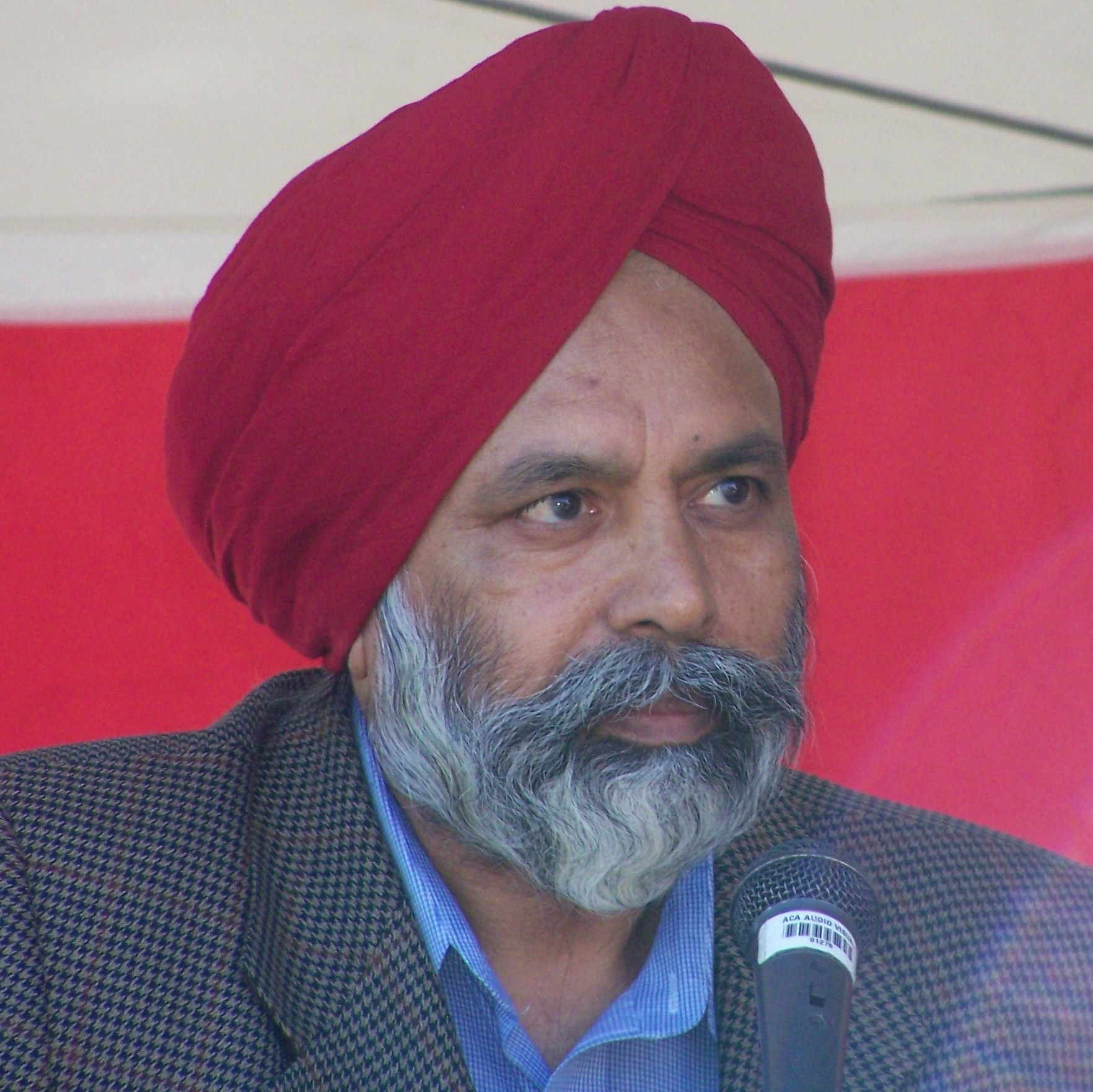
- Kang in 2008

Member of Parliament
- In office October 19, 2015 – September 11, 2019
- Preceded by: Riding created
- Succeeded by: Jag Sahota
- Constituency: Calgary Skyview

Member of the Legislative Assembly of Alberta
- In office March 3, 2008 – May 5, 2015
- Preceded by: Shiraz Shariff
- Succeeded by: Irfan Sabir
- Constituency: Calgary-McCall

Personal details
- Born: 1951 (age 74–75) Punjab, India
- Party: Independent
- Other political affiliations: Liberal
- Spouse: Sharanjit Kang
- Education: University of Indore (BSc)
- Occupation: Real estate agent

Darshan Singh Kang (born 1951) is a Canadian politician, who served in the House of Commons of Canada representing Calgary Skyview from 2015 until 2019. He previously sat as a member of the Liberal Party of Canada caucus. Prior to his election to Parliament, he served as a Member of the Legislative Assembly of Alberta for Calgary-McCall from 2008 to 2015, representing the Alberta Liberal Party.

Before entering politics, he was a welder and a real estate agent.

== Political career ==
=== Provincial politics ===
Kang ran for office for the first time in Calgary-McCall in the 2004 Alberta general election. He was defeated in a closely contested race by incumbent Progressive Conservative MLA Shiraz Shariff.

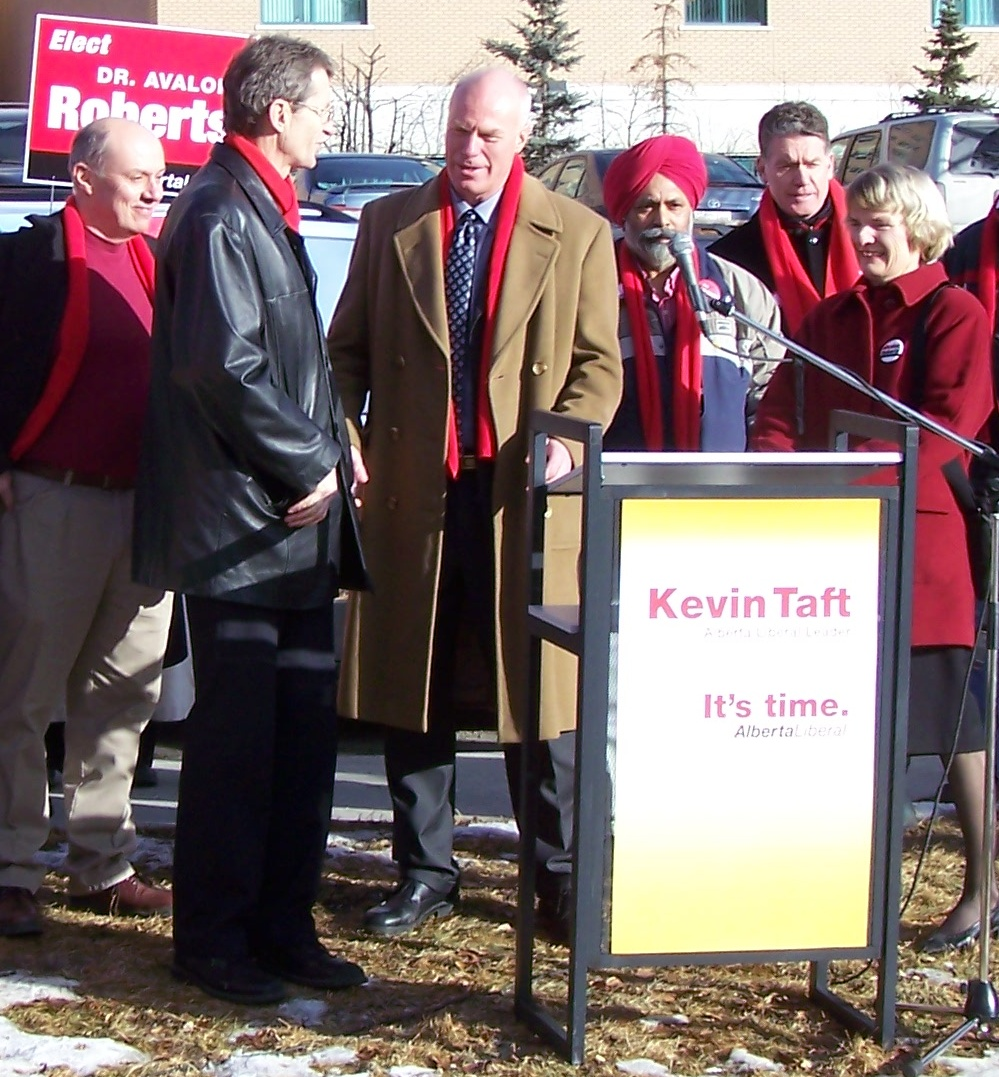
Darshan Kang (third from right) attends a news conference with Kevin Taft (third from left) in Calgary, as part of the 2008 provincial election campaign.

Kang won his second bid for office in the 2008 Alberta general election. The election was a virtual rematch of 2004, with all of the same candidates running. Kang defeated Shariff by 98 votes, after returns in the advanced polls showed he had won overwhelming victories. Kang's numbers increased upon the official recount to 118 votes. Shiraz Shariff challenged the vote in court, claiming that the results of the advanced polling and special ballots was tainted, but the challenge was unsuccessful.

In the 2012 provincial election, Kang was initially declared to have been defeated by Wildrose candidate Grant Galpin, but was later declared re-elected after all polling stations, special ballots and advance polls were counted. He declined to run in the 2015 provincial election in order to run for federal office.

=== Federal politics ===
In June 2014, Kang was acclaimed as the Liberal Party's candidate for the riding of Calgary Skyview in the 2015 federal election. The riding had previously been Calgary Northeast, represented by sitting Conservative Devinder Shory.

Kang ultimately won, narrowly defeating Shory. He and Kent Hehr of Calgary Centre were the first federal Liberals elected from Calgary since Pat Mahoney in 1968, and only the fifth and sixth Liberals elected from Calgary ridings in the party's entire history.

=== Sexual harassment allegations ===
On August 11, 2017, The Hill Times reported that Kang was being investigated by the House of Commons Chief Human Resources Officer for sexual harassment following allegations made by a female staff member in his Calgary constituency office. Pablo Rodríguez, the Liberal government whip, had referred the matter to the Chief Human Resources Officer after learning of the allegations. On August 29, 2017, the Toronto Star reported that the father of the woman claimed that Kang offered her a series of payments to not share details of the alleged harassment. On the same day, Kang took medical leave, citing the stress that resulted from the harassment allegation.

On August 31, 2017, The Hill Times reported allegations by another constituency officer staffer of Kang's that he had kissed and grabbed her breasts without consent and had ignored her saying "no" and "stop". These allegations stemmed from Kang's time in the Albertan legislature. The same day, Kang resigned from the Liberal caucus saying that he wanted to focus on clearing his name and that he did not want the allegations to disrupt caucus work. In September 2017, David Khan, the leader of the Alberta Liberal Party announced that would investigate Kang's actions during his time as MLA.

In March 2018, the report concluded that Kang's actions towards his former staffer violated the House of Commons's harassment rules. It found that most of her allegations were substantiated, including that Kang had misled her into entering his Ottawa apartment, where he touched her hands and tried to remove her jacket and massage her feet. It also found that Kang had later repeatedly attempted to enter her hotel room over her objections. Although the report found that Kang was unaware that his behaviour caused his former staffer discomfort, he should have known that his behaviour was offensive and unwelcome. The report was unable to substantiate the female staffer's claim that Kang had offered her money to stay silent because it was unclear who exactly had made the offer. After the report was released, Prime Minister Justin Trudeau announced that Kang would not be welcomed back as a Liberal MP. In the same month, the Alberta Liberal Party released new workplace policies that included a revamped complaints process and stricter policies to fight harassment in response to its investigation into Kang.

Kang appealed the findings of the report to a legal panel, arguing that the investigation was unfair and the investigator was biased. On August 8, 2018, the panel accepted the investigation's report "without revision" and rejected Kang's appeal.

== Electoral record ==
=== 2015 federal election ===
2015 Canadian federal election
Party	Candidate	Votes	%	±%	Expenditures
Liberal	Darshan Singh Kang	20,664	45.88	+17.24	$125,611.09
Conservative	Devinder Shory	17,885	39.75	-16.50	$155,284.22
New Democratic	Sahajvir Singh	3,605	8.01	-2.03	$91,462.67
Progressive Canadian	Najeeb Butt	957	2.13	–	$5,050.00
Green	Ed Reddy	846	1.88	-2.75	$682.50
Democratic Advancement	Stephen Garvey	786	1.75	–	$31,134.16
Independent	Joseph Young	182	0.40	–	$1,614.02
Marxist–Leninist	Daniel Blanchard	88	0.20	–0.24	–
Total valid votes/Expense limit		44,993	100.00		$206,487.35
Total rejected ballots		310	0.68	–	
Turnout		45,303	61.52	–	
Eligible voters		73,643			
Liberal gain from Conservative		Swing		+16.87	
Source: Elections Canada

=== 2012 Alberta general election ===
2012 Alberta general election: Calgary-McCall
Party	Candidate	Votes	%	±%
Liberal	Darshan Kang	3,865	36.69	-7.69
Wildrose	Grant Galpin	3,185	30.24	+24.62
Progressive Conservative	Muhammad Rasheed	3,085	29.29	-13.87
New Democratic	Collette Singh	227	2.15	-0.70
Evergreen	Heather Brocklesby	137	1.30	-2.69
Independent	Tanveer Taj	35	0.33	
Total valid votes		10,534	98.68	
Rejected, spoiled, and declined		141	1.32	
Turnout		10,675	44.81	+13.12
Registered electors		23,824		
Liberal hold		Swing		-16.16
Source(s) "Provincial General Election of the Twenty-Eighth Legislative Assembly" (PDF). Elections Alberta.

=== 2008 Alberta general election ===
2008 Alberta general election: Calgary-McCall
Party	Candidate	Votes	%	±%
Liberal	Darshan Kang	4,279	44.38%	4.93%
Progressive Conservative	Shiraz Shariff	4,161	43.16%	-0.44%
Wildrose Alliance	Ina Given	542	5.62%	-2.24%
Green	Heather Brocklesby	385	3.99%	-0.62%
New Democratic	Preet Sihota	275	2.85%	-1.63%
9,642				
Rejected, spoiled and declined		68		
Eligible electors / turnout		32,531	31.69%	
Liberal gain from Progressive Conservative		Swing		2.69%
The Report on the March 3, 2008 Provincial General Election of the Twenty-seventh Legislative Assembly. Elections Alberta. July 28, 2008. pp. 230–233.

=== 2004 Alberta general election ===
2004 Alberta general election: Calgary-McCall
Party	Candidate	Votes	%	±%
Progressive Conservative	Shiraz Shariff	3,195	43.60%	-26.55%
Liberal	Darshan Kang	2,891	39.45%	17.18%
Alberta Alliance	Ina Given	576	7.86%	
Green	Sean Brocklesby	338	4.61%	
New Democratic	Preet Sihota	328	4.48%	-0.32%
Total		7,328		
Rejected, spoiled and declined		86		
Eligible electors / turnout		21,831	33.96%	
Progressive Conservative hold		Swing		-21.87%
"Calgary-McCall Statement of Official Results 2004 Alberta general election" (PDF). Elections Alberta.
