= Calgary Forest Lawn =

Federal electoral district in Alberta, Canada

Alberta electoral district
- Boundaries of Calgary Forest Lawn as of the 2013 Representation Order

Defunct federal electoral district
- Legislature: House of Commons
- District created: 2013
- District abolished: 2023
- First contested: 2015
- Last contested: 2021
- District webpage: profile, map

Demographics
- Population (2011): 108,251
- Electors (2019): 75,376
- Area (km²): 53
- Census division: Division No. 6
- Census subdivision: Calgary

Calgary Forest Lawn is a former federal electoral district in Alberta, Canada, that was represented in the House of Commons of Canada from 2015 to 2025.

Calgary Forest Lawn was created by the 2012 federal electoral boundaries redistribution and was defined in the 2013 representation order. It came into effect upon the call of the 42nd Canadian federal election, scheduled for October 2015. It was created out of parts of the electoral districts of Calgary East and Calgary Northeast.

The 2022 Canadian federal electoral redistribution transferred the northern neighbourhoods of Coral Springs, Monterey Park, Rundle and Prineridge to the new riding of Calgary McKnight. While the remaining portion was transferred to the newly created riding of Calgary East.

It is named after the Calgary neighbourhood of Forest Lawn.

== Demographics ==
According to the 2011 Canadian census

Languages: 59.1% English, 5.2% Vietnamese, 4.7% Chinese, 4.7% Tagalog, 4.6% Punjabi, 3.8% Arabic, 2.6% Spanish, 1.5% Urdu, 1.4% French, 12.4% Other
Religions: 49.6% Christian, 11.6% Muslim, 6.0% Buddhist, 4.7% Sikh, 2.2% Hindu, 0.7% Other, 25.2% None
Median income: $27,331 (2010)
Average income: $33,458 (2010)

Panethnic groups in Calgary Forest Lawn (2011−2021)
Panethnic group	2021		2016		2011	
Panethnic group	Pop.	%	Pop.	%	Pop.	%
European (Note: Statistic includes all persons that did not make up part of a visible minority or an indigenous identity.)	40,140	37.52%	47,305	42.58%	51,760	48.18%
Southeast Asian (Note: Statistic includes total responses of "Filipino" and "Southeast Asian" under visible minority section on census.)	20,240	18.92%	18,465	16.62%	15,810	14.72%
African	11,595	10.84%	9,285	8.36%	6,550	6.1%
South Asian	11,065	10.34%	12,740	11.47%	11,840	11.02%
Middle Eastern (Note: Statistic includes total responses of "West Asian" and "Arab" under visible minority section on census.)	9,140	8.54%	7,960	7.16%	6,065	5.65%
Indigenous	5,180	4.84%	5,160	4.64%	4,555	4.24%
East Asian (Note: Statistic includes total responses of "Chinese", "Korean", and "Japanese" under visible minority section on census.)	3,850	3.6%	4,825	4.34%	5,835	5.43%
Latin American	2,525	2.36%	2,775	2.5%	2,755	2.56%
Other/Multiracial (Note: Statistic includes total responses of "Visible minority, n.i.e." and "Multiple visible minorities" under visible minority section on census.)	3,255	3.04%	2,575	2.32%	2,245	2.09%
Total responses	106,985	99.12%	111,100	99.35%	107,425	99.3%
Total population	107,939	100%	111,830	100%	108,183	100%
Notes: Totals greater than 100% due to multiple origin responses. Demographics based on 2012 Canadian federal electoral redistribution riding boundaries.

== Members of Parliament ==
This riding has elected the following members of the House of Commons of Canada:

Calgary Forest Lawn
Parliament	Years	Member	Party
Riding created from Calgary East and Calgary Northeast
42nd	2015–2019	Deepak Obhrai	Conservative
43rd	2019–2021	Jasraj Hallan	Conservative
44th	2021–2025	Jasraj Hallan	Conservative
Riding dissolved into Calgary East and Calgary McKnight

The seat became vacant on August 2, 2019, with the death of Deepak Obhrai. Since the vacancy occurred less than nine months before the fixed-date general election of October 21, 2019, no by-election was held.

== Election results ==
View source data.
Graph of election results in Calgary Forest Lawn (minor parties that never got 2% of the vote or didn't run consistently are omitted)

2021 Canadian federal election
Party	Candidate	Votes	%	±%	Expenditures
Conservative	Jasraj Singh Hallan	15,434	44.55	–15.02	$77,160.49
Liberal	Jordan Stein	9,608	27.73	+5.99	$23,940.40
New Democratic	Keira Gunn	6,254	18.05	+7.47	$1,836.99
People's	Dwayne Holub	2,468	7.12	+4.40	$1,923.40
Green	Carey Rutherford	699	2.02	–1.28	$89.23
Communist	Jonathan Trautman	185	0.53	+0.19	none listed
Total valid votes/expense limit		34,648	98.74	–	$107,834.34
Total rejected ballots		442	1.26	+0.28	
Turnout		35,090	47.95	–5.37	
Eligible voters		73,174			
Conservative hold		Swing		–10.51	
Source: Elections Canada

2019 Canadian federal election
Party	Candidate	Votes	%	±%	Expenditures
Conservative	Jasraj Singh Hallan	23,805	59.57	+11.59	$89,191.38
Liberal	Jag Anand	8,690	21.74	–14.22	$41,769.04
New Democratic	Joe Pimlott	4,227	10.58	+0.82	$956.74
Green	William Carnegie	1,318	3.30	+0.31	$2,962.82
People's	Dave Levesque	1,089	2.72	–	$6,037.90
Independent	Brent Nichols	388	0.97	–	none listed
Christian Heritage	Esther Sutherland	222	0.56	–	$1,021.00
Communist	Jonathan Trautman	134	0.34	–0.61	$476.56
Veterans Coalition	William James Ryder	91	0.23	–	none listed
Total valid votes/expense limit		39,964	99.02	–	$105,644.29
Total rejected ballots		395	0.98	+0.15	
Turnout		40,359	53.33	–1.62	
Eligible voters		75,683			
Conservative hold		Swing		+12.91	
Source: Elections Canada

2015 Canadian federal election
Party	Candidate	Votes	%	±%	Expenditures
Conservative	Deepak Obhrai	19,694	47.98	–15.37	$94,875.17
Liberal	Cam Stewart	14,762	35.96	+18.50	$22,574.93
New Democratic	Abdou Souraya	4,006	9.76	–3.39	$36,479.40
Green	Judson Hansell	1,229	2.99	–2.31	$2,422.51
Libertarian	Matt Badura	832	2.03	–	none listed
Communist	Jason Devine	390	0.95	–	none listed
Democratic Advancement	Max Veress	134	0.33	–	none listed
Total valid votes/expense limit		41,047	99.17	–	$207,423.03
Total rejected ballots		345	0.83	–	
Turnout		41,392	54.94	–	
Eligible voters		75,336			
Conservative hold		Swing		N/A	
Source: Elections Canada

2011 federal election redistributed results
Party	Vote	%
Conservative	19,574	63.35
Liberal	5,397	17.47
New Democratic	4,064	13.15
Green	1,638	5.30
Others	227	0.73

== List of EDAs ==
=== Calgary Forest Lawn Federal Liberal Association ===
Chief Executive Officer: Zachary E.D. Trynacity-Popowich

Financial agent: Lindsay E. Amantea

=== Calgary Forest Lawn Conservative Association ===
Chief Executive Officer: Dilpreet K. Samra

=== Calgary Forest Lawn Federal Green Party Association ===
Chief Executive Officer: K. Diann Duthie

Financial agent: Gerald R. Dumontier

=== Calgary Forest Lawn Federal NDP Riding Association ===
Chief Executive Officer: Maria T. Glavine

Financial agent: Jason J. Nishiyama

=== Calgary North PPC Association ===
Chief Executive Officer: Marc-Antoine P.G. Lebeau

Financial agent: Ernie E. Rawlyck

Director-At-Large: Isaias Nolasco

== See also ==
- List of Canadian electoral districts
- Historical federal electoral districts of Canada
