= George Chahal =

Canadian politician

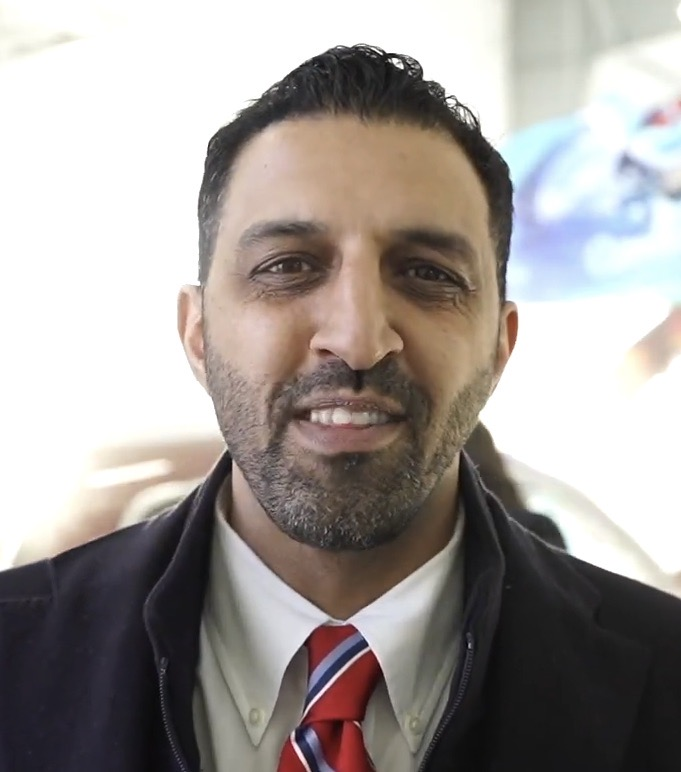

Member of Parliament for Calgary Skyview
- In office September 20, 2021 – March 23, 2025
- Preceded by: Jag Sahota
- Succeeded by: Amanpreet Gill

Calgary City Councillor
- In office 2017–2021
- Preceded by: Ray Jones
- Succeeded by: Raj Dhaliwal
- Constituency: Ward 5

Personal details
- Born: Harnirjodh Chahal; June 5, 1975 (age 51) Calgary, Alberta, Canada
- Party: Liberal
- Occupation: Politician

Harnirjodh "George" Chahal is a Canadian politician who was the Member of Parliament for Calgary Skyview as a member of the Liberal Party of Canada. He was the Liberal candidate for the federal riding of Calgary McKnight in the 2025 federal election. Before entering federal politics, he was a Councillor for Ward 5 on the Calgary City Council from 2017 to 2021.

== Early life ==
George was born at Calgary’s Holy Cross Hospital in 1975 to Ram and Surinder Chahal, who had recently immigrated from the United Kingdom to pursue the challenges and opportunities of Western Canada and raise their young family.

== Municipal politics ==
Chahal was responsible for securing funding for the Genesis Centre's outdoor artificial turf field, which began construction in April 2021 to replace the aging natural turf, and provide enhanced recreational infrastructure for Calgary’s northeast community. As part of his ongoing efforts for his constituents, Chahal launched annual community cleanups, including a large-scale event coinciding with Calgary’s Neighbour Day celebrations.

Chahal introduced a motion at Calgary City Council in 2019 calling on the city to formally oppose Quebec’s Bill 21, which bans certain public servants from wearing religious symbols—a move that garnered national attention and marked Calgary as one of the first municipalities in Canada to take a formal stance on the issue.

Following the retirement of longtime Councillor Ray Jones, parts of Jones's former ward were incorporated into Ward 5. Chahal assumed responsibility for representing those constituents, ensuring continued support and representation for the affected communities.

== Federal politics ==
On July 8, 2021, Chahal, who was originally slated to seek re-election to city council, announced that he was nominated to be the candidate for the Liberal Party in Calgary Skyview in the 2021 Canadian federal election.

On September 20, 2021, Chahal won the election, making him the only victorious Liberal candidate in Calgary (incumbent Conservative MPs won in the city's other nine ridings).

Chahal served on the Standing Committee on Transport, Infrastructure and Communities from December 2021 until September 2023. He continued serving on the Standing Committee on Natural Resources and was elected Chair of that committee on September 27, 2023. He oversaw the review of various studies, and two pieces of legislation: Bill-C50 (An Act respecting accountability, transparency and engagement to support the creation of sustainable jobs for workers and economic growth in a net-zero economy) which was referred to the committee on October 17, 2023, and sent back to the House with amendments on December 11, 2023, and Bill C49 (An Act to amend the Canada—Newfoundland and Labrador Atlantic Accord Implementation Act and the Canada-Nova Scotia Offshore Petroleum Resources Accord Implementation Act and to make consequential amendments to other Acts) which was referred to the committee on October 23, 2023, and sent back the House with amendments on April 18, 2024.

In his riding, he organized annual community cleanup events, including its sixth installment in 2023, which brought residents together to clean-up their neighbourhood. He also launched an annual Faith and Community Breakfast to bring together religious and civic leaders from across his constituency for dialogue and relationship-building. To support workers, Chahal organized job fairs in his riding, connecting job seekers with employers from various sectors. His third annual job fair featured over 1,000 well-paying job opportunities and drew significant attendance from constituents.

Chahal helped facilitate federal investments in Calgary, including over $13 million in funding through PrairiesCan to help innovative companies scale up and create new employment opportunities in the region.

In the 2025 Liberal Party of Canada leadership election, he endorsed Mark Carney. In the 2025 Canadian federal election, Chahal contested Calgary McKnight. He was unseated by Conservative candidate Amanpreet Gill. His old riding also went Conservative.

== Election flyer controversy ==
On September 24, 2021, the Calgary Police's Anti-Corruption Unit announced that they were investigating George Chahal over a doorbell camera video that appeared to show Chahal removing a flyer for his Conservative opponent, Jag Sahota, from a constituent's door on the eve of the election.

Chahal's campaign said that he removed the flyer supposedly because it identified an incorrect polling location for the voter's area; however, the homeowner said that Chahal's flyer was the one with the incorrect information, and that Sahota's matched the official information given to them by Elections Canada.

In January 2022, Chahal accepted and paid a $500 administrative monetary penalty assessed by the Commissioner of Canada Elections in the matter, saying, "It’s just a late night on an election campaign. Call it a dumb mistake or brain fog—it really doesn’t matter why I did what I did. I think what matters is I did it. And I acknowledged it fully, openly, publicly."

== Electoral record ==
2025 Canadian federal election: Calgary McKnight
** Preliminary results — Not yet official **
Party	Candidate	Votes	%	±%	Expenditures
Conservative	Dalwinder Gill	20,850	49.13	+14.91	
Liberal	George Chahal	19,516	45.99	+2.23	
New Democratic	Arlington Antonio Santiago	1,204	2.84	–13.34	
People's	Najeeb Butt	323	0.76	–3.18	
Green	Evelyn Tanaka	273	0.64	–0.49	
Canadian Future	Benjamin Cridland	162	0.38	N/A	
Centrist	Syed Hasnain	107	0.25	N/A	
Total valid votes/expense limit					
Total rejected ballots					
Turnout		42,435	56.22		
Eligible voters		75,474			
Conservative notional gain from Liberal		Swing		+6.34	
Source: Elections Canada

2021 Canadian federal election: Calgary Skyview
Party	Candidate	Votes	%	±%	Expenditures
Liberal	George Chahal	20,092	42.36	+14.02	$102,944.51
Conservative	Jag Sahota	17,111	36.07	–16.42	$82,418.22
New Democratic	Gurinder Singh Gill	7,690	16.21	+1.29	$15,396.31
People's	Harry Dhillon	1,720	3.63	+2.44	$3,904.85
Green	Janna So	432	0.91	–0.67	none listed
Independent	Lee Aquart	184	0.39	–	$4,123.83
Marxist–Leninist	Daniel Blanchard	111	0.23	–0.03	none listed
Centrist	Nadeem Rana	93	0.20	–	$674.40
Total valid votes/expense limit		47,433	98.95	–	$116,250.12
Total rejected ballots		502	1.05	+0.08	
Turnout		47,935	54.50	–5.62	
Eligible voters		87,956			
Liberal gain from Conservative		Swing		+15.22	
Source: Elections Canada
