= Stan Nelson =

Canadian politician

MLA for Calgary-McCall
- In office 1983–1993
- Preceded by: Andrew Little
- Succeeded by: Harry Sohal

Personal details
- Born: March 27, 1939 (age 87) Vancouver, British Columbia
- Party: Progressive Conservative Association of Alberta

Stanley Kenneth Nelson (born March 27, 1939) is a former municipal alderman and a provincial level politician from Alberta, Canada.

== Political career ==
Stan Nelson was elected as the Alderman for the Calgary City Council representing Ward 5 in NE Calgary in 1977 and again in 1980. Nelson was first elected to the Legislative Assembly of Alberta in the 1982 Alberta general election. He won a commanding majority of votes taking over 75% of the ballots cast and defeating four other candidates. Nelson won his second term in the 1986 Alberta general election winning a greatly reduced plurality but still taking about 75% of the popular vote. He won his third and final term in office in the 1989 Alberta general election Nelson's plurality was reduced again, this time he defeated two other candidates winning just over half of the popular vote in the riding. He retired when the Legislature was dissolved in 1993.
