= Harry Sohal =

Canadian politician

MLA for Calgary McCall
- In office 1993 – November 15, 1994
- Preceded by: Stan Nelson
- Succeeded by: Shiraz Shariff

Personal details
- Born: December 10, 1946 Athola Punjab India
- Died: November 15, 1994 (aged 47) Calgary, Alberta, Canada
- Party: Progressive Conservative Association of Alberta
- Occupation: Businessman, consultant

Harry B. Sohal (December 10, 1946 – November 15, 1994) was an Indian-born provincial level politician from Alberta, Canada. After immigrating to Canada in 1971, Sohal earned an MA and then a PhD in history from the University of Waterloo in 1979. He worked as a consultant and small businessman before entering public life.

== Political career ==
Sohal was elected to the Legislative Assembly of Alberta in the 1993 Alberta general election. He won the Calgary McCall electoral district holding it for the Progressive Conservatives. Sohal died a year into his first term in office on November 15, 1994, as a result of a heart attack while jogging.
