= Calgary McKnight (federal electoral district) =

Federal electoral district in Alberta, Canda

Alberta electoral district
- Interactive map of riding boundaries from the 2025 federal election

Federal electoral district
- Legislature: House of Commons
MP
Dalwinder Gill
Conservative
- District created: 2023
- First contested: 2025
- Last contested: 2025
- District webpage: profile, map

Demographics
- Population (2021): 123,148
- Electors (2025): 74,507
- Area (km²): 74
- Pop. density (per km²): 1,664.2
- Census division: Division No. 6
- Census subdivision: Calgary (part)

Calgary McKnight is a federal electoral district in Alberta, Canada. It came into effect upon the call of the 2025 Canadian federal election.

== Geography ==
Under the 2022 Canadian federal electoral redistribution the riding will be created from parts of Calgary Forest Lawn and Calgary Skyview. It is named after McKnight Boulevard which runs though the riding.

- The neighbourhoods of Martindale, Taradale, Saddle Ridge, Castleridge, Falconridge, Coral Springs, Westwinds, Whitehorn, Temple, Rundle and Pineridge

Calgary International Airport is included in this riding.

== Demographics ==
According to the 2021 Canadian census

Languages: 46.7% English, 19.1% Punjabi, 5.2% Tagalog, 4.6% Urdu, 3.0% Arabic, 2.1% Vietnamese, 2.0% Spanish, 1.6% Hindi, 1.5% Cantonese, 1.2% French

Religions: 33.1% Christian (16.4% Catholic, 1.5% Christian Orthodox, 1.1% Anglican, 1.1% Pentecostal, 12.9% Other), 21.0% Sikh, 19.9% Muslim, 17.0% No religion, 6.0% Hindu, 2.4% Buddhist

Median income: $34,400 (2020)

Average income: $40,440 (2020)

Panethnic groups (2021)
Panethnic group	2021	
Panethnic group	Pop.	%
South Asian	48,240	39.11%
European (Note: Statistic includes all persons that did not make up part of a visible minority or an indigenous identity.)	25,290	20.51%
Southeast Asian (Note: Statistic includes total responses of "Filipino" and "Southeast Asian" under visible minority section on census.)	17,790	14.42%
African	10,370	8.41%
Middle Eastern (Note: Statistic includes total responses of "West Asian" and "Arab" under visible minority section on census.)	9,155	7.42%
East Asian (Note: Statistic includes total responses of "Chinese", "Korean", and "Japanese" under visible minority section on census.)	3,260	2.64%
Indigenous	3,195	2.59%
Latin American	3,045	2.47%
Other/multiracial (Note: Statistic includes total responses of "Visible minority, n.i.e." and "Multiple visible minorities" under visible minority section on census.)	2,990	2.42%
Total responses	123,330	99.64%
Total population	123,775	100%
Notes: Totals greater than 100% due to multiple origin responses. Demographics based on 2022 Canadian federal electoral redistribution riding boundaries.

== History ==
Parliament	Years	Member	Party
Calgary McKnight; Riding created from Calgary Forest Lawn and Calgary Skyview
45th	2025–present	Dalwinder Gill	Conservative

== Election results ==
2025 Canadian federal election
Party	Candidate	Votes	%	±%	Expenditures
Conservative	Dalwinder Gill	20,863	49.11	+14.90	$126,384.67
Liberal	George Chahal	19,546	46.01	+2.25	$108,817.43
New Democratic	Arlington Antonio Santiago	1,204	2.83	–13.35	$125,587.44
People's	Najeeb Butt	323	0.76	–3.18	none listed
Green	Evelyn Tanaka	273	0.64	–0.49	none listed
Canadian Future	Benjamin Cridland	162	0.38	–	$944.62
Centrist	Syed Hasnain	107	0.25	+0.12	none listed
Total valid votes/expense limit		42,478	98.56	–	$125,587.44
Total rejected ballots		622	1.44	–	
Turnout		43,100	56.52	–	
Eligible voters		76,258			
Conservative notional gain from Liberal		Swing		+6.33	
Source: Elections Canada

2021 federal election redistributed results
Party	Vote	%
Liberal	16,282	43.76
Conservative	12,733	34.22
New Democratic	6,020	16.18
People's	1,465	3.94
Green	422	1.13
Others	285	0.77
